= List of statutory instruments of the United Kingdom, 1994 =

This is a complete list of all 1,851 statutory instruments published in the United Kingdom in the year 1994.

== 1–100 ==
- Public Telecommunication System Designation (Vodafone Limited) Order 1994 (S.I. 1994/1)
- Oxfordshire County Council (Shifford Island Footbridge) Scheme 1993 Confirmation Instrument 1994 (S.I. 1994/12)
- Road Vehicles (Construction and Use) (Amendment) Regulations 1994 (S.I. 1994/14)
- Local Government Act 1988 (Defined Activities) (Exemption) (Harlow District Council) Order 1994 (S.I. 1994/15)
- Anglian Harbours National Health Service Trust (Transfer of Trust Property) Order 1994 (S.I. 1994/22)
- Brighton Health Care National Health Service Trust (Transfer of Trust Property) Order 1994 (S.I. 1994/23)
- Burnley Health Care National Health Service Trust (Transfer of Trust Property) Order 1994 (S.I. 1994/24)
- Cleveland Ambulance National Health Service Trust (Transfer of Trust Property) Order 1994 (S.I. 1994/25)
- Plymouth Community Services National Health Service Trust (Transfer of Trust Property) Order 1994 (S.I. 1994/26)
- South Downs Health National Health Service Trust (Transfer of Trust Property) Order 1994 (S.I. 1994/27)
- Birmingham City Council (Birmingham and Fazeley Canal Bridge) Scheme 1992 Confirmation Instrument 1994 (S.I. 1994/28)
- Cornwall and Isles of Scilly Learning Disabilities National Health Service Trust (Transfer of Trust Property) Order 1994 (S.I. 1994/29)
- Doncaster Healthcare National Health Service Trust (Transfer of Trust Property) Order 1994 (S.I. 1994/30)
- Forest Healthcare National Health Service Trust (Transfer of Trust Property) Order 1994 (S.I. 1994/31)
- Freeman Group of Hospitals National Health Service Trust (Transfer of Trust Property) Order 1994 (S.I. 1994/32)
- Frenchay Healthcare National Health Service Trust (Transfer of Trust Property) Order 1994 (S.I. 1994/33)
- James Paget Hospital National Health Service Trust (Transfer of Trust Property) Order 1994 (S.I. 1994/34)
- North Hertfordshire National Health Service Trust (Transfer of Trust Property) Order 1994 (S.I. 1994/35)
- Westcountry Ambulance Service National Health Service Trust (Transfer of Trust Property) Order 1994 (S.I. 1994/36)
- Local Authorities (Goods and Services) (Public Bodies) Order 1994 (S.I. 1994/37)
- Housing (Welfare Services) Order 1994 (S.I. 1994/42)
- A406 Trunk Road (Golders Green Road/Brent Street Junction Improvement, Trunk Road) Order 1994 (S.I. 1994/43)
- Food Protection (Emergency Prohibitions) (Radioactivity in Sheep) Partial Revocation Order 1994 (S.I. 1994/50)
- Calderstones National Health Service Trust (Transfer of Trust Property) Order 1994 (S.I. 1994/51)
- Phoenix National Health Service Trust (Transfer of Trust Property) Order 1994 (S.I. 1994/52)
- Rugby National Health Service Trust (Transfer of Trust Property) Order 1994 (S.I. 1994/53)
- South Tees Acute Hospitals National Health Service Trust (Transfer of Trust Property) Order 1994 (S.I. 1994/54)
- York Health Services National Health Service Trust (Transfer of Trust Property) Order 1994 (S.I. 1994/55)
- Frimley Park Hospital National Health Service Trust (Transfer of Trust Property) Order 1994 (S.I. 1994/59)
- Homewood National Health Service Trust (Transfer of Trust Property) Order 1994 (S.I. 1994/60)
- Phoenix National Health Service Trust (Transfer of Trust Property) (No. 2) Order 1994 (S.I. 1994/61)
- St Helens and Knowsley Community Health National Health Service Trust (Transfer of Trust Property) Order 1994 (S.I. 1994/62)
- Food Protection (Emergency Prohibitions) (Radioactivity in Sheep) (Wales) (Partial Revocation) Order 1994 (S.I. 1994/63)
- Non-Domestic Rates (Scotland) Order 1994 (S.I. 1994/64)
- Food Protection (Emergency Prohibitions) (Radioactivity in Sheep) (England) (Partial Revocation) Order 1994 (S.I. 1994/65)
- Chorley (Parishes) Order 1994 (S.I. 1994/67)
- General Optical Council (Testing of Sight by Persons Training as Ophthalmic Opticians Rules) Order of Council 1994 (S.I. 1994/70)
- Criminal Justice Act 1993 (Commencement No. 4) Order 1994 (S.I. 1994/71)
- Merger References (Increase in Value of Assets) Order 1994 (S.I. 1994/72)
- Water Enterprises (Merger) (Modification) Regulations 1994 (S.I. 1994/73)
- Road Traffic Act 1991 (Commencement No. 10 and Transitional Provisions) Order 1994 (S.I. 1994/81)
- Road Traffic (Special Parking Areas) (London Boroughs of Richmond upon Thames and Southwark) (Amendment) Order 1994 (S.I. 1994/82)
- European Parliamentary Elections (Day of Election) Order 1994 (S.I. 1994/83)
- Chappel and Wakes Colne Light Railway Order 1994 (S.I. 1994/84)
- Pension Schemes Act 1993 (Commencement No. 1) Order 1994 (S.I. 1994/86)
- Finance Act 1989, section 152, (Appointed Day) Order 1994 (S.I. 1994/87)
- Hill Livestock (Compensatory Allowances) (Amendment) Regulations 1994 (S.I. 1994/94)

== 101–200 ==
- Medicines Act 1968 (Amendment) Regulations 1994 (S.I. 1994/101)
- Medicines (Advisory Board on the Registration of Homoeopathic Products) Order 1994 (S.I. 1994/102)
- Medicines (Standard Provisions for Licences and Certificates) Amendment Regulations 1994 (S.I. 1994/103)
- Medicines (Labelling and Leaflets) Amendment Regulations 1994 (S.I. 1994/104)
- Medicines (Homoeopathic Medicinal Products for Human Use) Regulations 1994 (S.I. 1994/105)
- Housing Revenue Account General Fund Contribution Limits (Scotland) Order 1994 (S.I. 1994/106)
- Glasgow Community and Mental Health Services National Health Service Trust (Change of Name) (Establishment) Amendment Order 1994 (S.I. 1994/107)
- London-Holyhead Trunk Road (Gwalchmai By-Pass) (Revocation) Order 1994 (S.I. 1994/108)
- Race Relations (Prescribed Public Bodies) Regulations 1994 (S.I. 1994/109)
- A18 Trunk Road (Junction 5, M180 Motorway) (Detrunking) Order 1994 (S.I. 1994/110)
- Salmon (Definition of Methods of Net Fishing and Construction of Nets) (Scotland) Amendment Regulations 1994 (S.I. 1994/111)
- Welsh Language Act 1993 (Commencement) Order 1994 (S.I. 1994/115)
- Driving Licences (Designation of Relevant External Law) Order 1994 (S.I. 1994/116)
- Companies (Welsh Language Forms and Documents) Regulations 1994 (S.I. 1994/117)
- Control of Industrial Major Accident Hazards (Amendment) Regulations 1994 (S.I. 1994/118)
- Criminal Justice Act 1988 (Reviews of Sentencing) Order 1994 (S.I. 1994/119)
- Fertilisers (Sampling and Analysis) (Amendment) Regulations 1994 (S.I. 1994/129)
- Cardiff and Vale of Glamorgan (Areas) Order 1994 (S.I. 1994/130)
- National Health Service (Optical Charges and Payments) Amendment Regulations 1994 (S.I. 1994/131)
- Friendly Societies (Auditors) Order 1994 (S.I. 1994/132)
- Secure Tenants of Local Housing Authorities (Right to Repair) Regulations 1994 (S.I. 1994/133)
- A23 Trunk Road (Brighton Road, Croydon) (Prohibition of Right Turn and U-Turn) Order 1994 (S.I. 1994/134)
- Council Tax (Transitional Reduction Scheme) (England) Regulations 1994 (S.I. 1994/135)
- European Communities (Iron and Steel Employees Re-adaptation Benefits Scheme) (No. 2) (Scheme Termination) Regulations 1994 (S.I. 1994/141)
- Vale of Glamorgan (Barry and Dinas Powys Communities) Order 1994 (S.I. 1994/142)
- Free Zone (Prestwick Airport) Designation (Variation) Order 1994 (S.I. 1994/143)
- Free Zone (Humberside) Designation Order 1994 (S.I. 1994/144)
- National Health Service (Optical Charges and Payments) (Scotland) Amendment Regulations 1994 (S.I. 1994/145)
- Education (Grant) (Henrietta Barnett School) Regulations 1994 (S.I. 1994/156)
- Railways and Other Transport Systems (Approval of Works, Plant and Equipment) Regulations 1994 (S.I. 1994/157)
- Industrial Training Levy (Engineering Construction Board) Order 1994 (S.I. 1994/158)
- Industrial Training Levy (Construction Board) Order 1994 (S.I. 1994/159)
- Dairy Produce Quotas (Amendment) Regulations 1994 (S.I. 1994/160)
- South Manchester University Hospitals National Health Service Trust (Establishment) Order 1994 (S.I. 1994/161)
- Dudley Priority Health National Health Service Trust (Establishment) Order 1994 (S.I. 1994/162)
- Kent and Sussex Weald National Health Service Trust (Establishment) Order 1994 (S.I. 1994/163)
- Salford Hospitals National Health Service Trust (Establishment) Order 1994 (S.I. 1994/164)
- Mid–Sussex National Health Service Trust (Establishment) Order 1994 (S.I. 1994/165)
- Royal West Sussex National Health Service Trust (Establishment) Order 1994 (S.I. 1994/166)
- Dorset Community National Health Service Trust (Establishment) Order 1994 (S.I. 1994/167)
- Dudley Group of Hospitals National Health Service Trust (Establishment) Order 1994 (S.I. 1994/168)
- Alexandra Health Care National Health Service Trust (Establishment) Order 1994 (S.I. 1994/169)
- Coventry Healthcare National Health Service Trust (Establishment) Order 1994 (S.I. 1994/170)
- South Birmingham Mental Health National Health Service Trust (Establishment) Order 1994 (S.I. 1994/171)
- Sandwell Healthcare National Health Service Trust (Establishment) Order 1994 (S.I. 1994/172)
- Northern Birmingham Mental Health National Health Service Trust (Establishment) Order 1994 (S.I. 1994/173)
- Weald of Kent Community National Health Service Trust (Establishment) Order 1994 (S.I. 1994/174)
- South Kent Hospitals National Health Service Trust (Establishment) Order 1994 (S.I. 1994/175)
- Norfolk and Norwich Health Care National Health Service Trust (Establishment) Order 1994 (S.I. 1994/176)
- St. Albans and Hemel Hempstead National Health Service Trust (Establishment) Order 1994 (S.I. 1994/177)
- North Hampshire Hospitals National Health Service Trust (Establishment) Order 1994 (S.I. 1994/178)
- Furness Hospitals National Health Service Trust (Establishment) Order 1994 (S.I. 1994/179)
- Trafford Healthcare National Health Service Trust (Establishment) Order 1994 (S.I. 1994/180)
- East Surrey Learning Disability and Mental Health Service National Health Service Trust (Establishment) Order 1994 (S.I. 1994/181)
- Surrey Ambulance National Health Service Trust (Establishment) Order 1994 (S.I. 1994/182)
- Bexley Community Health National Health Service Trust (Establishment) Order 1994 (S.I. 1994/183)
- Heathlands Mental Health National Health Service Trust (Establishment) Order 1994 (S.I. 1994/184)
- Mancunian Community Health National Health Service Trust (Establishment) Order 1994 (S.I. 1994/185)
- Insider Dealing (Securities and Regulated Markets) Order 1994 (S.I. 1994/187)
- Traded Securities (Disclosure) Regulations 1994 (S.I. 1994/188)
- National Lottery Regulations 1994 (S.I. 1994/189)
- Community Health Care: North Durham National Health Service Trust (Establishment) Amendment Order 1994 (S.I. 1994/194)
- Northwick Park Hospital National Health Service Trust (Change of Name) Order 1994 (S.I. 1994/195)
- Gateshead Healthcare National Health Service Trust (Establishment) Order 1994 (S.I. 1994/196)
- Premier Health National Health Service Trust (Establishment) Order 1994 (S.I. 1994/197)
- Northgate and Prudhoe National Health Service Trust (Establishment) Order 1994 (S.I. 1994/198)
- Environmental Protection (Non-Refillable Refrigerant Containers) Regulations 1994 (S.I. 1994/199)
- New Town (East Kilbride) Winding Up (Variation) Order 1994 (S.I. 1994/200)

== 201–300 ==
- Lyon Court and Office Fees (Variation) Order 1994 (S.I. 1994/201)
- Railways Act 1993 (Commencement No. 2) Order 1994 (S.I. 1994/202)
- Act of Sederunt (Solicitor's Right of Audience) 1994 (S.I. 1994/221)
- Education (Teachers) (Amendment) Regulations 1994 (S.I. 1994/222)
- Nuffield Orthopaedic Centre National Health Service Trust (Transfer of Trust Property) Order 1994 (S.I. 1994/223)
- Mid Essex Community Health National Health Service Trust (Transfer of Trust Property) Order 1994 (S.I. 1994/224)
- South Western Regional Health Authority (Transfer of Trust Property) Order 1994 (S.I. 1994/225)
- Walsall Community Health National Health Service Trust (Transfer of Trust Property) Order 1994 (S.I. 1994/226)
- Child Support (Miscellaneous Amendments and Transitional Provisions) Regulations 1994 (S.I. 1994/227)
- Legal Aid in Civil Proceedings (Remuneration) Regulations 1994 (S.I. 1994/228)
- Civil Legal Aid (General) (Amendment) Regulations 1994 (S.I. 1994/229)
- Legal Aid in Family Proceedings (Remuneration) (Amendment) Regulations 1994 (S.I. 1994/230)
- Batteries and Accumulators (Containing Dangerous Substances) Regulations 1994 (S.I. 1994/232)
- Companies Act 1985 (Bank Accounts) Regulations 1994 (S.I. 1994/233)
- Public Telecommunication System Designation (NYNEX CableComms Bury and Rochdale) Order 1994 (S.I. 1994/234)
- Distraint by Collectors (Fees, Costs and Charges) Regulations 1994 (S.I. 1994/236)
- Railways (Safety Case) Regulations 1994 (S.I. 1994/237)
- Environmentally Sensitive Areas (Clwydian Range) Designation Order 1994 (S.I. 1994/238)
- Environmentally Sensitive Areas (Preseli) Designation Order 1994 (S.I. 1994/239)
- Environmentally Sensitive Areas (Cambrian Mountains-Extension) Designation (Amendment) Order 1994 (S.I. 1994/240)
- Environmentally Sensitive Areas (Lleyn Peninsula) Designation (Amendment) Order 1994 (S.I. 1994/241)
- Criminal Justice Act 1993 (Commencement No. 5) Order 1994 (S.I. 1994/242)
- National Rivers Authority (Severn-Trent and Anglian Regional Flood Defence Committees Areas) (Boundaries) Order 1994 (S.I. 1994/245)
- Local Authorities (Alteration of Requisite Calculations and Funds) Regulations 1994 (S.I. 1994/246)
- Copyright (Certification of Licensing Scheme for Educational Recording of Broadcasts and Cable Programmes) (Educational Recording Agency Limited) (Amendment) Order 1994 (S.I. 1994/247)
- Agriculture Act 1986 (Amendment) Regulations 1994 (S.I. 1994/249)
- Lothian Region (Electoral Arrangements) Amendment Order 1994 (S.I. 1994/259)
- Wells and Walsingham Light Railway (Amendment) Order 1994 (SI 1994/260)
- Child Abduction and Custody (Parties to Conventions) (Amendment) Order 1994 (S.I. 1994/262)
- Copyright (Application to Other Countries) (Amendment) Order 1994 (S.I. 1994/263)
- Performances (Reciprocal Protection) (Convention Countries) Order 1994 (S.I. 1994/264)
- Trustee Investments (Additional Powers) Order 1994 (S.I. 1994/265)
- Housing (Change of Landlord) (Payment of Disposal Cost by Instalments) (Amendment) Regulations 1994 (S.I. 1994/266)
- Town and Country Planning (Simplified Planning Zones) (Amendment) Regulations 1994 (S.I. 1994/267)
- Social Security Benefit (Persons Abroad) Amendment Regulations 1994 (S.I. 1994/268)
- Conwy Mussel Fishery (Amendment) Regulations 1994 (S.I. 1994/275)
- Medicines Act 1968 (Amendment) (No. 2) Regulations 1994 (S.I. 1994/276)
- Education (Financial Delegation to Schools) (Mandatory Exceptions) Regulations 1994 (S.I. 1994/277)
- New Possibilities National Health Service Trust (Transfer of Trust Property) Order 1994 (S.I. 1994/278)
- Richmond, Twickenham and Roehampton Healthcare National Health Service Trust (Transfer of Trust Property) Order 1994 (S.I. 1994/279)
- Good Hope Hospital National Health Service Trust (Transfer of Trust Property) Order 1994 (S.I. 1994/280)
- Essex Rivers Healthcare National Health Service Trust (Transfer of Trust Property) Order 1994 (S.I. 1994/281)
- Milk Marketing Scheme (Substitution of Date of Revocation) Order 1994 (S.I. 1994/282)
- National Health Service (Functions of Family Health Services Authorities in London) Regulations 1994 (S.I. 1994/284)
- Land Charges Fees (Amendment) Rules 1994 (S.I. 1994/286)
- Land Charges (Amendment) Rules 1994 (S.I. 1994/287)
- Solicitors (Disciplinary Proceedings) Rules 1994 (S.I. 1994/288)
- Income Tax (Deposit-takers) (Interest Payments) (Amendment) Regulations 1994 (S.I. 1994/295)
- Income Tax (Building Societies) (Dividends and Interest) (Amendment) Regulations 1994 (S.I. 1994/296)
- Quick-frozen Foodstuffs (Amendment) Regulations 1994 (S.I. 1994/298)
- Railways (Safety Critical Work) Regulations 1994 (S.I. 1994/299)

== 301–400 ==
- Veterinary Surgeons and Veterinary Practitioners (Registration) (Amendment) Regulations Order of Council 1994 (S.I. 1994/305)
- County Court (Amendment) Rules 1994 (S.I. 1994/306)
- Royal Hospital of St. Bartholomew, the Royal London Hospital and London Chest Hospital National Health Service Trust (Establishment) Order 1994 (S.I. 1994/307)
- Newham Healthcare National Health Service Trust (Establishment) Order 1994 (S.I. 1994/308)
- Tavistock and Portman National Health Service Trust (Establishment) Order 1994 (S.I. 1994/309)
- Alteration of Boundaries of the Newark Area and Upper Witham Internal Drainage Districts Order 1994 (S.I. 1994/310)
- Public Health (International Trains) Regulations 1994 (S.I. 1994/311)
- East Glamorgan National Health Service Trust (Establishment) Order 1994 (S.I. 1994/316)
- Morriston Hospital National Health Service Trust (Establishment) Order 1994 (S.I. 1994/317)
- Central Manchester National Health Service Trust (Transfer of Trust Property) Order 1994 (S.I. 1994/318)
- Education (School Financial Statements) (Prescribed Particulars etc.) Regulations 1994 (S.I. 1994/323)
- Inshore Fishing (Prohibition of Fishing and Fishing Methods) (Scotland) Amendment Order 1994 (S.I. 1994/326)
- Goods Vehicles (Plating and Testing) (Amendment) Regulations 1994 (S.I. 1994/328)
- Road Vehicles (Construction and Use) (Amendment) (No. 2) Regulations 1994 (S.I. 1994/329)
- Berkshire, Buckinghamshire and Surrey (County Boundaries) Order 1994 (S.I. 1994/330)
- Greater London and Surrey (County and London Borough Boundaries) Order 1994 (S.I. 1994/331)
- Local Government, Planning and Land Act 1980 (Competition) (Wales) Regulations 1994 (S.I. 1994/338)
- Local Government Act 1988 (Defined Activities) (Exemptions) (Wales) Order 1994 (S.I. 1994/339)
- Financial Services (Disclosure of Information) (Designated Authorities) (No. 8) Order 1994 (S.I. 1994/340)
- Industrial and Provident Societies (Increase in Shareholding Limit) Order 1994 (S.I. 1994/341)
- European Parliamentary Elections (Changes to the Franchise and Qualification of Representatives) Regulations 1994 (S.I. 1994/342)
- Savings Certificates (Amendment) Regulations 1994 (S.I. 1994/343)
- Superannuation (Children's Pensions) (Earnings Limit) Order 1994 (S.I. 1994/350)
- Self-Governing Schools (Application and Amendment of Regulations) (Scotland) Regulations 1994 (S.I. 1994/351)
- North West London Mental Health National Health Service Trust (Transfer of Trust Property) Order 1994 (S.I. 1994/358)
- Central Middlesex Hospital National Health Service Trust (Transfer of Trust Property) Order 1994 (S.I. 1994/359)
- Parkside National Health Service Trust (Transfer of Trust Property) Order 1994 (S.I. 1994/360)
- Patent Agents (Mixed Partnerships and Bodies Corporate) Rules 1994 (S.I. 1994/362)
- Registered Trade Mark Agents (Mixed Partnerships and Bodies Corporate) Rules 1994 (S.I. 1994/363)
- Docklands Light Railway (Penalty Fares and Provision of Police Services) Order 1994 (S.I. 1994/371)
- Offshore Installations (Safety Zones) Order 1994 (S.I. 1994/372)
- Act of Sederunt (Fees of Messengers-at-Arms) 1994 (S.I. 1994/391)
- Act of Sederunt (Fees of Sheriff Officers) 1994 (S.I. 1994/392)
- Health and Safety (Fees) Regulations 1994 (S.I. 1994/397)
- Planning and Compensation Act 1991 (Commencement No. 16) (Scotland) Order 1994 (S.I. 1994/398)
- Great Ormond Street Hospital for Children National Health Service Trust (Establishment) Order 1994 (S.I. 1994/400)

== 401–500 ==
- Royal Marsden National Health Service Trust (Establishment) Order 1994 (S.I. 1994/401)
- Royal Brompton Hospital National Health Service Trust (Establishment) Order 1994 (S.I. 1994/402)
- Moorfields Eye Hospital National Health Service Trust (Establishment) Order 1994 (S.I. 1994/403)
- Bethlem and Maudsley National Health Service Trust (Establishment) Order 1994 (S.I. 1994/404)
- National Health Service Trusts (Originating Capital Debt) Order 1994 (S.I. 1994/405)
- Sugar Beet (Research and Education) Order 1994 (S.I. 1994/407)
- Non–Domestic Rating (Demand Notices) (Wales) (Amendment) Regulations 1994 (S.I. 1994/415)
- Redundancy Payments (Local Government) (Modification) (Amendment) Order 1994 (S.I. 1994/417)
- Non-Domestic Rating Contributions (England) (Amendment) Regulations 1994 (S.I. 1994/421)
- Merchant Shipping (Ro-Ro Passenger Ship Survivability) Regulations 1994 (S.I. 1994/422)
- Biotechnology and Biological Sciences Research Council Order 1994 (S.I. 1994/423)
- Engineering and Physical Sciences Research Council Order 1994 (S.I. 1994/424)
- Particle Physics and Astronomy Research Council Order 1994 (S.I. 1994/425)
- Airports (Northern Ireland) Order 1994 (S.I. 1994/426)
- European Parliamentary Constituencies (England) Order 1994 (S.I. 1994/427)
- European Parliamentary Constituencies (Wales) Order 1994 (S.I. 1994/428)
- Health and Personal Social Services (Northern Ireland) Order 1994 (S.I. 1994/429)
- Housing Support Grant (Scotland) Order 1994 (S.I. 1994/430)
- Self-Governing Schools Grant and Recovery (Scotland) Regulations 1994 (S.I. 1994/431)
- Hyde Park and The Regent's Park (Vehicle Parking) Regulations 1994 (S.I. 1994/432)
- Housing Renovation etc. Grants (Prescribed Forms and Particulars) (Welsh Forms and Particulars) (Amendment) Regulations 1994 (S.I. 1994/435)
- Education Act 1993 (Commencement No. 2 and Transitional Provisions) (Amendment) Order 1994 (S.I. 1994/436)
- Ozone Monitoring and Information Regulations 1994 (S.I. 1994/440)
- Railways Act 1993 (Commencement No. 3) Order 1994 (S.I. 1994/447)
- Auditors (Insurance Companies Act 1982) Regulations 1994 (S.I. 1994/449)
- Textile Products (Indications of Fibre Content) (Amendment) Regulations 1994 (S.I. 1994/450)
- Sea Fishing (Enforcement of Community Control Measures) Order 1994 (S.I. 1994/451)
- Sea Fish (Marketing Standards) (Amendment) Regulations 1994 (S.I. 1994/452)
- Broadcasting (Foreign Satellite Programmes) (Specified Countries) Order 1994 (S.I. 1994/453)
- Broadcasting (Prescribed Countries) Order 1994 (S.I. 1994/454)
- Acquisition of Land (Rate of Interest after Entry) Regulations 1994 (S.I. 1994/468)
- Acquisition of Land (Rate of Interest after Entry) (Scotland) Regulations 1994 (S.I. 1994/469)
- Housing Benefit and Council Tax Benefit (Amendment) Regulations 1994 (S.I. 1994/470)
- Combined Probation Areas (Greater Manchester) Order 1994 (S.I. 1994/471)
- Marek's Disease (Restriction on Vaccination) (Revocation) Order 1994 (S.I. 1994/472)
- Combined Probation Areas (Buckinghamshire) Order 1994 (S.I. 1994/473)
- Self-Governing Schools (Change in Characteristics) (Scotland) Regulations 1994 (S.I. 1994/478)
- Avalon, Somerset, National Health Service Trust (Transfer of Trust Property) Order 1994 (S.I. 1994/481)
- Churchill John Radcliffe National Health Service Trust (Change of Name) Order 1994 (S.I. 1994/482)
- South Bedfordshire Community Health Care National Health Service Trust (Transfer of Trust Property) Order 1994 (S.I. 1994/483)
- Barnsley District General Hospital National Health Service Trust (Transfer of Trust Property) Order 1994 (S.I. 1994/484)
- Merton and Sutton Community National Health Service Trust (Transfer of Trust Property) Order 1994 (S.I. 1994/485)
- Luton and Dunstable Hospital Trust National Health Service Trust (Transfer of Trust Property) Order 1994 (S.I. 1994/486)
- Royal Devon and Exeter Healthcare National Health Service Trust (Transfer of Trust Property) Order 1994 (S.I. 1994/487)
- Mid-Staffordshire General Hospitals National Health Service Trust (Transfer of Trust Property) Order 1994 (S.I. 1994/488)
- Humberside Ambulance Service National Health Service Trust (Transfer of Trust Property) Order 1994 (S.I. 1994/489)
- North Yorkshire Ambulance Service National Health Service Trust (Transfer of Trust Property) Order 1994 (S.I. 1994/490)
- Southampton University Hospitals National Health Service Trust (Transfer of Trust Property) Order 1994 (S.I. 1994/491)
- South Yorkshire Metropolitan Ambulance and Paramedic Service National Health Service Trust (Transfer of Trust Property) Order 1994 (S.I. 1994/492)
- Royal Hull Hospitals National Health Service Trust (Transfer of Trust Property) Order 1994 (S.I. 1994/493)
- Huddersfield Health Care Services National Health Service Trust (Transfer of Trust Property) Order 1994 (S.I. 1994/494)
- National Health Service (Optical Charges and Payments) Amendment (No. 2) Regulations 1994 (S.I. 1994/495)
- National Health Service Trusts (Originating Capital Debt) (Scotland) Order 1994 (S.I. 1994/496)
- Lands Tribunal for Scotland (Amendment) (Fees) Rules 1994 (S.I. 1994/497)
- Scottish Land Court (Fees) Order 1994 (S.I. 1994/498)
- Feeding Stuffs (Amendment) Regulations 1994 (S.I. 1994/499)
- Guaranteed Minimum Pensions Increase Order 1994 (S.I. 1994/500)

== 501–600 ==
- Return of Cultural Objects Regulations 1994 S.I. 1994/501
- Merchant Shipping (Fees) (Amendment) Regulations 1994 S.I. 1994/502
- Civil Aviation (Navigation Services Charges) (Fourth Amendment) Regulations 1994 S.I. 1994/503
- Community Charges (Administration and Enforcement) (Amendment) Regulations 1994 S.I. 1994/504
- Council Tax (Administration and Enforcement) (Amendment) Regulations 1994 S.I. 1994/505
- Social Fund Maternity and Funeral Expenses (General) Amendment Regulations 1994 S.I. 1994/506
- Education Act 1993 (Commencement No. 3 and Transitional Provisions) Order 1994 S.I. 1994/507
- National Health Service Trusts (Appointment of Trustees) (Scotland) Order 1994 S.I. 1994/510
- Employers' Liability (Compulsory Insurance) Exemption (Amendment) Regulations 1994 S.I. 1994/520
- Environmental Protection (Waste Recycling Payments) (Amendment) Regulations 1994 S.I. 1994/522
- Housing Benefit and Council Tax Benefit (Subsidy) Order 1994 S.I. 1994/523
- Accountants (Banking Act 1987) Regulations 1994 S.I. 1994/524
- Building Societies (Auditors) Order 1994 S.I. 1994/525
- Auditors (Financial Services Act 1986) Rules 1994 S.I. 1994/526
- Income-related Benefits Schemes (Miscellaneous Amendments) Regulations 1994 S.I. 1994/527
- Local Government Finance (Scotland) Order 1994 S.I. 1994/528
- Revenue Support Grant (Scotland) Order 1994 S.I. 1994/529
- National Health Service (Dental Charges) Amendment Regulations 1994 S.I. 1994/530
- Local Government Superannuation (Scotland) Amendment Regulations 1994 S.I. 1994/531
- Electricity Supply (Amendment) Regulations 1994 S.I. 1994/533
- Export of Goods (Control) (Amendment No 7) Order 1994 S.I. 1994/534
- Misuse of Drugs (Licence Fees) (Amendment) Regulations 1994 S.I. 1994/535
- Industrial Tribunals (Constitution and Rules of Procedure) (Amendment) Regulations 1994 S.I. 1994/536
- Education (Particulars of Independent Schools) (Amendment) Regulations 1994 S.I. 1994/537
- Industrial Tribunals (Constitution and Rules of Procedure) (Scotland) (Amendment) Regulations 1994 S.I. 1994/538
- Council Tax (Exempt Dwellings) (Amendment) Order 1994 S.I. 1994/539
- Council Tax (Additional Provisions for Discount Disregards) (Amendment) Regulations 1994 S.I. 1994/540
- Merchant Shipping (Registration of Ships) (Amendment) Regulations 1994 S.I. 1994/541
- Social Security Benefits Up-rating Order 1994 S.I. 1994/542
- Council Tax (Discount Disregards) (Amendment) Order 1994 S.I. 1994/543
- Social Security (Contributions) (Re-rating and National Insurance Fund Payments) Order 1994 S.I. 1994/544
- National Health Service Act 1977 (Composition of Medical Practices Committee) Modification Order 1994 S.I. 1994/545
- Certification Officer (Amendment of Fees) Regulations 1994 S.I. 1994/546
- Non-Domestic Rating Contributions (Wales) (Amendment) Regulations 1994 S.I. 1994/547
- Home Purchase Assistance (Commutation of Repayments) Order 1994 S.I. 1994/548
- City of Stoke-on-Trent (Downfields Canal Bridge) Scheme, 1993 Confirmation Instrument 1994 S.I. 1994/551
- Local Authorities (Capital Finance) (Amendment) Regulations 1994 S.I. 1994/553
- Motor Cars (Driving Instruction) (Amendment) Regulations 1994 S.I. 1994/554
- Agricultural Training Board (Revocation) Order 1994 S.I. 1994/555
- British Citizenship (Designated Service) (Amendment) Order 1994 S.I. 1994/556
- Warrington (Parishes) Order 1994 S.I. 1994/557
- Medicines (Products Other Than Veterinary Drugs) (Prescription Only) Amendment Order 1994 S.I. 1994/558
- Social Security Benefits Up-rating Regulations 1994 S.I. 1994/559
- Local Authorities (Capital Finance) (Rate of Discount for 1994/95) Regulations 1994 S.I. 1994/560
- Statutory Sick Pay (Small Employers' Relief) Amendment Regulations 1994 S.I. 1994/561
- Statutory Sick Pay (Rate of Payment) Order 1994 S.I. 1994/562
- Social Security (Contributions) Amendment Regulations 1994 S.I. 1994/563
- Birmingham City Council, (Birmingham and Fazeley Canal Bridge) Scheme 1990 Confirmation Instrument 1994 S.I. 1994/564
- Housing Renovation etc. Grants (Prescribed Forms and Particulars) Regulations 1994 S.I. 1994/565
- Castle Vale Housing Action Trust (Transfer of Property) Order 1994 S.I. 1994/566
- Local Government (Direct Labour Organisations) (Competition) (Exemption) (England) Regulations 1994 S.I. 1994/567
- Rent Officers (Additional Functions) (Amendment) Order 1994 S.I. 1994/568
- Local Government Act 1988 (Defined Activities) (Exemption) (England) Order 1994 S.I. 1994/569
- Channel Tunnel (Security) Order 1994 S.I. 1994/570
- Railways Act 1993 (Commencement No. 4 and Transitional Provision) Order 1994 S.I. 1994/571
- Railways (Licence Application) Regulations 1994 S.I. 1994/572
- Railways (London Regional Transport) (Exemptions) Order 1994 S.I. 1994/573
- Railways (Heathrow Express) (Exemptions) Order 1994 S.I. 1994/574
- Railways (Registers) Order 1994 S.I. 1994/575
- Railways (Penalty Fares) Regulations 1994 S.I. 1994/576
- British Railways (Penalty Fares) Act 1989 (Revocation of Activating Orders) Order 1994 S.I. 1994/577
- Housing Benefit and Council Tax Benefit (Miscellaneous Amendments) Regulations 1994 S.I. 1994/578
- Housing Benefit (Permitted Totals) Order 1994 S.I. 1994/579
- Education (London Residuary Body) (Transfer of Property etc.) Order 1994 S.I. 1994/580
- Education (Middle Schools) (Amendment) Regulations 1994 S.I. 1994/581
- Rent Officers (Additional Functions) (Scotland) Amendment Order 1994 S.I. 1994/582
- National Board for Nursing, Midwifery and Health Visiting for England (Constitution and Administration) Amendment Order 1994 (S.I. 1994/586)
- National Blood Authority (Establishment and Constitution) Amendment Order 1994 (S.I. 1994/589)
- National Health Service Functions (Directions to Authorities and Administration Arrangements) Amendment Regulations 1994 (S.I. 1994/590)
- Statutory Maternity Pay (Compensation of Employers) Amendment Regulations 1994 (S.I. 1994/592)
- Wireless Telegraphy (Television Licence Fees) (Amendment) Regulations 1994 (S.I. 1994/595)
- Medicines (Veterinary Drugs) (Pharmacy and Merchants' List) (Amendment) Order 1994 (S.I. 1994/599)
- Crown Office Fees Order 1994 (S.I. 1994/600)

== 601–700 ==
- Enrolment of Deeds (Fees) Regulations 1994 (S.I. 1994/601)
- Microbiological Research Authority Regulations 1994 (S.I. 1994/602)
- Microbiological Research Authority (Establishment and Constitution) Order 1994 (S.I. 1994/603)
- Enrolment of Deeds (Change of Name) Regulations 1994 (S.I. 1994/604)
- Railways (Class and Miscellaneous Exemptions) Order 1994 (S.I. 1994/606)
- Railways (Alternative Closure Procedure) Order 1994 (S.I. 1994/607)
- Railways (Amendment) Regulations 1994 (S.I. 1994/608)
- British Transport Police Force Scheme 1963 (Amendment) Order 1994 (S.I. 1994/609)
- Education (Grant-maintained Schools) (Finance) (Wales) Regulations 1994 (S.I. 1994/610)
- Research Councils (Transfer of Property etc.) Order 1994 (S.I. 1994/611)
- Education (Grants for Education Support and Training) Regulations 1994 (S.I. 1994/612)
- Secure Tenants of Local Authorities (Compensation for Improvements) Regulations 1994 (S.I. 1994/613)
- Local Authorities (Members' Allowances) (Amendment) Regulations 1994 (S.I. 1994/615)
- Motor Vehicles (EC Type Approval) (Amendment) Regulations 1994 (S.I. 1994/617)
- Thanet Health Care National Health Service Trust (Transfer of Trust Property) Order 1994 (S.I. 1994/619)
- Canterbury and Thanet Community Healthcare National Health Service Trust (Transfer of Trust Property) Order 1994 (S.I. 1994/620)
- West Lindsey National Health Service Trust (Transfer of Trust Property) Order 1994 (S.I. 1994/621)
- Mancunian Community Health National Health Service Trust (Transfer of Trust Property) Order 1994 (S.I. 1994/622)
- Hillingdon Hospital National Health Service Trust (Transfer of Trust Property) Order 1994 (S.I. 1994/623)
- Andover District Community Health Care National Health Service Trust (Transfer of Trust Property) Order 1994 (S.I. 1994/624)
- South Tees Community and Mental Health National Health Service Trust (Transfer of Trust Property) Order 1994 (S.I. 1994/625)
- Council Tax (Discounts) (Scotland) Amendment Order 1994 (S.I. 1994/626)
- Housing (Right to Manage) Regulations 1994 (S.I. 1994/627)
- Council Tax (Exempt Dwellings) (Scotland) Amendment Order 1994 (S.I. 1994/628)
- Council Tax (Discounts) (Scotland) Amendment Regulations 1994 (S.I. 1994/629)
- Local Authorities Etc. (Allowances) (Scotland) Amendment Regulations 1994 (S.I. 1994/630)
- PARLIAMENT S.I. 1994/631)
- Secure Tenants (Compensation for Improvements) (Scotland) Regulations 1994 (S.I. 1994/632)
- National Health Service (General Medical Services) Amendment Regulations 1994 (S.I. 1994/633)
- National Health Service (Service Committees and Tribunal) Amendment Regulations 1994 (S.I. 1994/634)
- National Health Service (Optical Charges and Payments) (Scotland) Amendment (No.2) Regulations 1994 (S.I. 1994/635)
- National Health Service (Dental Charges) (Scotland) Amendment Regulations 1994 (S.I. 1994/636)
- Home Energy Efficiency Grants (Amendment) Regulations 1994 (S.I. 1994/637)
- Motor Vehicles (Driving Licences) (Amendment) Regulations 1994 (S.I. 1994/638)
- Motor Vehicles (Driving Licences) (Large Goods and Passenger-Carrying Vehicles) (Amendment) Regulations 1994 (S.I. 1994/639)
- National Health Service (Fund-holding Practices) Amendment Regulations 1994 (S.I. 1994/640)
- Police Pensions (Amendment) Regulations 1994 (S.I. 1994/641)
- Fees for Inquiries (Standard Daily Amount) Regulations 1994 (S.I. 1994/642)
- Insurance (Fees) Regulations 1994 (S.I. 1994/643)
- Partnerships (Unrestricted Size) No. 11 Regulations 1994 (S.I. 1994/644)
- Education (School Curriculum and Assessment Authority) (Transfer of Functions) Order 1994 (S.I. 1994/645)
- Education (National Curriculum) (Assessment Arrangements for English, Welsh, Mathematics and Science) (Key Stage 1) (Wales) (Amendment) Order 1994 (S.I. 1994/646)
- Education (National Curriculum) (Assessment Arrangements for English, Welsh, Mathematics and Science) (Key Stage 3) (Wales) (Amendment) Order 1994 (S.I. 1994/647)
- Housing Renovation etc. Grants (Reduction of Grant) Regulations 1994 (S.I. 1994/648)
- Education (Payment for Special Educational Needs Supplies) Regulations 1994 (S.I. 1994/650)
- Education (Special Educational Needs) (Approval of Independent Schools) Regulations 1994 (S.I. 1994/651)
- Education (Special Schools) Regulations 1994 (S.I. 1994/652)
- Education (Grant-maintained Special Schools) Regulations 1994 (S.I. 1994/653)
- Education (Governors of New Grant-maintained Schools) Regulations 1994 (S.I. 1994/654)
- Building Societies (EFTA States) Order 1994 (S.I. 1994/655)
- Building Societies (General Charge and Fees) Regulations 1994 (S.I. 1994/656)
- Friendly Societies (General Charge and Fees) (Amendment) Regulations 1994 (S.I. 1994/657)
- Industrial and Provident Societies (Credit Unions) (Amendment of Fees) Regulations 1994 (S.I. 1994/658)
- Wireless Telegraphy (Licence Charges) (Amendment) Regulations 1994 (S.I. 1994/659)
- Industrial and Provident Societies (Amendment of Fees) Regulations 1994 (S.I. 1994/660)
- Bedfordshire and Hertfordshire Ambulance and Paramedic Service National Health Service Trust (Transfer of Trust Property) Order 1994 (S.I. 1994/661)
- Bedford Hospital National Health Service Trust (Transfer of Trust Property) Order 1994 (S.I. 1994/662)
- Bedford and Shires Health and Care National Health Service Trust (Transfer of Trust Property) Order 1994 (S.I. 1994/663)
- Hampshire Ambulance Service National Health Service Trust (Transfer of Trust Property) Order 1994 (S.I. 1994/664)
- Kent and Canterbury Hospitals National Health Service Trust (Transfer of Trust Property) Order 1994 (S.I. 1994/665)
- Eastbourne and County Healthcare National Health Service Trust (Transfer of Trust Property) Order 1994 (S.I. 1994/666)
- Social Security (Contributions) (Miscellaneous Amendments) Regulations 1994 (S.I. 1994/667)
- Registered Housing Associations (Accounting Requirements) (Wales) Order 1994 (S.I. 1994/668)
- Carriage of Dangerous Goods by Road and Rail (Classification, Packaging and Labelling) Regulations 1994 (S.I. 1994/669)
- Carriage of Dangerous Goods by Rail Regulations 1994 (S.I. 1994/670)
- Workmen's Compensation (Supplementation) (Amendment) Scheme 1994 (S.I. 1994/671)
- Dairy Produce Quotas Regulations 1994 (S.I. 1994/672)
- Bovine Spongiform Encephalopathy Compensation Order 1994 (S.I. 1994/673)
- Common Agricultural Policy (Wine) Regulations 1994 (S.I. 1994/674)
- Plant Breeders~ Rights (Fees) (Amendment) Regulations 1994 (S.I. 1994/675)
- Seeds (National Lists of Varieties) (Fees) Regulations 1994 (S.I. 1994/676)
- Town and Country Planning (Assessment of Environmental Effects) (Amendment) Regulations 1994 (S.I. 1994/677)
- Town and Country Planning General Development (Amendment) Order 1994 (S.I. 1994/678)
- Mount Vernon Hospital National Health Service Trust (Transfer of Trust Property) Order 1994 (S.I. 1994/679)
- National Health Service (District Health Authorities) Order 1994 (S.I. 1994/680)
- National Health Service (Determination of Districts) Order 1994 (S.I. 1994/681)
- National Health Service (Regional and District Health Authorities) (Miscellaneous Amendments) Regulations 1994 (S.I. 1994/682)
- National Health Service (Determination of Regions) Order 1994 (S.I. 1994/683)
- National Health Service (Regional Health Authorities) Order 1994 (S.I. 1994/684)
- Milk Marketing Schemes (Substitution of Date of Revocation) (Scotland) Order 1994 (S.I. 1994/685)
- Value Added Tax (Tax Free Shops) Order 1994 (S.I. 1994/686)
- Value Added Tax (Sport, Physical Education and Fund-Raising Events) Order 1994 (S.I. 1994/687)
- Road Traffic (Special Parking Areas) (London Boroughs of Bromley, Hammersmith and Fulham and Lewisham) (Amendment) Order 1994 (S.I. 1994/689)
- National Health Service (Charges for Drugs and Appliances) Amendment Regulations 1994 (S.I. 1994/690)
- Bowes Extension Light Railway Order 1994 (S.I. 1994/691)
- Education (No. 2) Act 1986 (Amendment) Order 1994 (S.I. 1994/692)
- Housing Renovation etc. Grants (Prescribed Forms and Particulars) (Welsh Forms and Particulars) Regulations 1994 (S.I. 1994/693)
- Hydrocarbon Oil (Amendment) (No. 2) Regulations 1994 (S.I. 1994/694)
- Tower Hamlets Housing Action Trust (Transfer of Property) Order 1994 (S.I. 1994/695)
- Medicines (Products for Human Use—Fees) Amendment Regulations 1994 (S.I. 1994/696)
- National Health Service (Charges for Drugs and Appliances) (Scotland) Amendment Regulations 1994 (S.I. 1994/697)
- Criminal Justice Act 1993 (Commencement No. 6) Order 1994 (S.I. 1994/700)

== 701–800 ==
- Greater Manchester (Light Rapid Transit System) (Modification) Order 1994 (S.I. 1994/701)
- London Regional Transport (Penalty Fares) Act 1992 (Activating No. 1) Order 1994 (S.I. 1994/702)
- Incumbents (Vacation of Benefices) Rules 1994 (S.I. 1994/703)
- Social Security Pensions (Home Responsibilities) Regulations 1994 (S.I. 1994/704)
- Civil Courts (Amendment) Order 1994 (S.I. 1994/706)
- Environmentally Sensitive Areas (Blackdown Hills) Designation Order 1994 (S.I. 1994/707)
- Environmentally Sensitive Areas (Cotswold Hills) Designation Order 1994 (S.I. 1994/708)
- Environmentally Sensitive Areas (Shropshire Hills) Designation Order 1994 (S.I. 1994/709)
- Environmentally Sensitive Areas (Dartmoor) Designation Order 1994 (S.I. 1994/710)
- Environmentally Sensitive Areas (Essex Coast) Designation Order 1994 (S.I. 1994/711)
- Environmentally Sensitive Areas (Upper Thames Tributaries) Designation Order 1994 (S.I. 1994/712)
- Public Trustee (Fees) (Amendment) Order 1994 (S.I. 1994/714)
- Personal Injuries (Civilians) Amendment Scheme 1994 (S.I. 1994/715)
- Education (Registered Inspectors of Schools Appeal Tribunal) (Procedure) Regulations 1994 (S.I. 1994/717)
- Transport and Works Act 1992 (Commencement No. 5 and Transitional Provisions) Order 1994 (S.I. 1994/718)
- National Rivers Authority (Alteration of Boundaries of the South Holland Internal Drainage District) Order 1993 S.I. 1994/723)
- Town and Country Planning (Use Classes) (Amendment) Order 1994 (S.I. 1994/724)
- Rent Act 1977 (Forms, etc.) (Welsh Forms and Particulars) (Amendment) Regulations 1994 (S.I. 1994/725)
- Social Security (Categorisation of Earners) Amendment Regulations 1994 (S.I. 1994/726)
- Rheoliadau (Ffurflenni a Dogfenni Cymraeg) Cwmn au (Diwygiad) 1994 (S.I. 1994/727)
- Lloyd's Underwriters (Tax) (1991–92)Regulations 1994 (S.I. 1994/728)
- General Optical Council (Registration and Enrolment (Amendment) Rules) Order of Council 1994 (S.I. 1994/729)
- Statutory Sick Pay Act 1994 (Consequential) Regulations 1994 (S.I. 1994/730)
- Child Support Act 1991 (Consequential Amendments) Order 1994 (S.I. 1994/731)
- Drinking Water in Containers Regulations 1994 (S.I. 1994/743)
- Telecommunications Act 1984 (Government Shareholding) Order 1994 (S.I. 1994/744)
- Mid Essex Community Health National Health Service Trust Dissolution Order 1994 (S.I. 1994/745)
- Representation of the People (Variation of Limits of Candidates' Election Expenses) Order 1994 (S.I. 1994/747)
- European Parliamentary Elections (Amendment) Regulations 1994 (S.I. 1994/748)
- Building Societies (Undated Subordinated Debt) Order 1994 (S.I. 1994/749)
- Building Societies (Designated Capital Resources) (Amendment) Order 1994 (S.I. 1994/750)
- European Communities (Designation) Order 1994 (S.I. 1994/757)
- European Communities (Definition of Treaties) (Europe Agreement establishing an Association between the European Communities and their Member States and the Republic of Bulgaria) Order 1994 (S.I. 1994/758)
- European Communities (Definition of Treaties) (Europe Agreement establishing an Association between the European Communities and their Member States and the Czech Republic) Order 1994 (S.I. 1994/759)
- European Communities (Definition of Treaties) (Europe Agreement establishing an Association between the European Communities and their Member States and Romania) Order 1994 (S.I. 1994/760)
- European Communities (Definition of Treaties) (Europe Agreement establishing an Association between the European Communities and their Member States and the Slovak Republic) Order 1994 (S.I. 1994/761)
- Appropriation (Northern Ireland) Order 1994 (S.I. 1994/762)
- Local Elections (Variation of Limits of Candidates' Election Expenses) (Northern Ireland) Order 1994 (S.I. 1994/763)
- Northern Ireland (Emergency Provisions) Act 1991 (Guernsey) Order 1994 (S.I. 1994/764)
- Social Security (Contributions) (Northern Ireland) Order 1994 (S.I. 1994/765)
- Statutory Sick Pay (Northern Ireland) Order 1994 (S.I. 1994/766)
- Double Taxation Relief (Air Transport) (Saudi Arabia) Order 1994 (S.I. 1994/767)
- Double Taxation Relief (Taxes on Income) (Austria) Order 1994 (S.I. 1994/768)
- Double Taxation Relief (Taxes on Income) (Indonesia) Order 1994 (S.I. 1994/769)
- Double Taxation Relief (Taxes on Income) (Uzbekistan) Order 1994 (S.I. 1994/770)
- Home Guard (Amendment) Order 1994 (S.I. 1994/771)
- Naval, Military and Air Forces etc. (Disablement and Death) Service Pensions Amendment Order 1994 (S.I. 1994/772)
- Ulster Defence Regiment (Amendment) Order 1994 (S.I. 1994/773)
- Merchant Shipping (Modification of Enactments) (Bareboat Charter Ships) Order 1994 (S.I. 1994/774)
- Income Tax (Employments) (Amendment) Regulations 1994 (S.I. 1994/775)
- Pensions Increase (Review) Order 1994 (S.I. 1994/776)
- Income Tax (Car Benefits) (Replacement Accessories) Regulations 1994 (S.I. 1994/777)
- Income Tax (Replacement Cars) Regulations 1994 (S.I. 1994/778)
- Education (Groups including Grant-maintained Special Schools) Regulations 1994 (S.I. 1994/779)
- Environmental Protection Act 1990 (Commencement No. 14) Order 1994 (S.I. 1994/780)
- Housing Benefit and Council Tax Benefit (Subsidy) Regulations 1994 (S.I. 1994/781)
- European Parliamentary Elections (Northern Ireland) (Amendment) Regulations 1994 (S.I. 1994/782)
- Medicines (Control of Substances for Manufacture and Exportation of Specified Products for Human Use) Amendment Order 1994 (S.I. 1994/787)
- Merchant Shipping (Seamen~s Wages and Accounts) (Amendment) Regulations 1994 (S.I. 1994/791)
- North Kent Healthcare National Health Service Trust (Establishment) Amendment Order 1994 (S.I. 1994/797)
- South Birmingham Community Health National Health Service Trust (Change of Name) Order 1994 (S.I. 1994/798)
- A564 Trunk Road (Stoke-Derby Route) (Derby Southern Bypass and Slip Road) (No. 3) Order 1994 (S.I. 1994/799)
- (M1) Motorway (Lockington) Connecting Roads Scheme 1994 (S.I. 1994/800)

== 801–900 ==
- A564 Trunk Road (Stoke–Derby Route) (Derby Southern Bypass, Derby Spur, Junctions and Slip Roads) Amendment Order 1994 (S.I. 1994/801)
- A564 Trunk Road (Stoke–Derby Route) (Derby Southern Bypass) (Detrunking) (No. 2) Order 1994 (S.I. 1994/802)
- Value Added Tax (Accounting and Records) (Amendment) Regulations 1994 (S.I. 1994/803)
- Food Labelling (Amendment) Regulations 1994 (S.I. 1994/804)
- Legal Advice and Assistance (Amendment) Regulations 1994 (S.I. 1994/805)
- Civil Legal Aid (Assessment of Resources) (Amendment) Regulations 1994 (S.I. 1994/806)
- Legal Aid in Criminal and Care Proceedings (General) (Amendment) Regulations 1994 (S.I. 1994/807)
- Family Proceedings (Amendment) Rules 1994 (S.I. 1994/808)
- Family Proceedings Courts (Miscellaneous Amendments) Rules 1994 (S.I. 1994/809)
- Borders Regional Council (Galashiels Mill Lade) (Amendment) Water Order 1994 (S.I. 1994/810)
- Tees and Hartlepool Port Authority (Dissolution) Order 1994 (S.I. 1994/818)
- National Assistance (Assessment of Resources) (Amendment) Regulations 1994 (S.I. 1994/825)
- National Assistance (Sums for Personal Requirements) Regulations 1994 (S.I. 1994/826)
- Gateshead Community Health National Health Service Trust Dissolution Order 1994 (S.I. 1994/827)
- Mancunian Community Health National Health Service Trust Dissolution Order 1994 (S.I. 1994/828)
- Northgate National Health Service Trust Dissolution Order 1994 (S.I. 1994/829)
- Royal London Hospital and Associated Community Services National Health Service Trust Dissolution Order 1994 (S.I. 1994/830)
- West Dorset Mental Health National Health Service Trust Dissolution Order 1994 (S.I. 1994/831)
- Premier Health National Health Service Trust Dissolution Order 1994 (S.I. 1994/832)
- West Dorset Community Health National Health Service Trust Dissolution Order 1994 (S.I. 1994/833)
- Non-Domestic Rating (Railways) and Central Rating Lists (Amendment) Regulations 1994 (S.I. 1994/834)
- Prevention of Terrorism (Temporary Provisions) Act 1989 (Continuance) Order 1994 (S.I. 1994/835)
- Secure Tenants of Local Housing Authorities (Right to Repair) (Amendment) Regulations 1994 (S.I. 1994/844)
- Harrow and Hillingdon Healthcare National Health Service Trust (Establishment) Order 1994 (S.I. 1994/848)
- Royal Victoria Infirmary and Associated Hospitals National Health Service Trust (Establishment) Order 1994 (S.I. 1994/849)
- University College London Hospitals National Health Service Trust (Establishment) Order 1994 (S.I. 1994/850)
- Newcastle City Health National Health Service Trust (Establishment) Order 1994 (S.I. 1994/851)
- Mount Vernon and Watford Hospitals National Health Service Trust (Establishment) Order 1994 (S.I. 1994/852)
- Hammersmith Hospitals National Health Service Trust (Establishment) Order 1994 (S.I. 1994/853)
- West Herts Community Health National Health Service Trust (Establishment) Order 1994 (S.I. 1994/854)
- Chelsea and Westminster Healthcare National Health Service Trust (Establishment) Order 1994 (S.I. 1994/855)
- South East London Mental Health National Health Service Trust (Change of Name and Miscellaneous Amendments) Order 1994 (S.I. 1994/856)
- Railways Act 1993 (Consequential Modifications) Order 1994 (S.I. 1994/857)
- Harrow Community Health Services National Health Service Trust Dissolution Order 1994 (S.I. 1994/858)
- Royal Victoria Infirmary and Associated Hospitals National Health Service Trust Dissolution Order 1994 (S.I. 1994/859)
- Mount Vernon Hospital National Health Service Trust Dissolution Order 1994 (S.I. 1994/860)
- Newcastle Mental Health National Health Service Trust Dissolution Order 1994 (S.I. 1994/861)
- Dacorum and St Albans Community National Health Service Trust Dissolution Order 1994 (S.I. 1994/862)
- Hillingdon Community Health National Health Service Trust Dissolution Order 1994 (S.I. 1994/863)
- Local Government Changes for England Regulations 1994 (S.I. 1994/867)
- Public Telecommunication System Designation (Encom Cable TV & Telecommunications Limited) (Dartford) Order 1994 (S.I. 1994/874)
- Public Telecommunication System Designation (Encom Cable TV & Telecommunications Limited) (Epping Forest) Order 1994 (S.I. 1994/875)
- Public Telecommunication System Designation (NYNEX CableComms Oldham and Tameside) Order 1994 (S.I. 1994/876)
- National Health Service (General Medical and Pharmaceutical Services) (Scotland) Amendment Regulations 1994 (S.I. 1994/884)
- European Parliamentary Elections (Returning Officers) (England and Wales) Order 1994 (S.I. 1994/894)
- Occupational Pension Schemes (Deficiency on Winding Up etc.) Regulations 1994 (S.I. 1994/895)
- Dorset Ambulance National Health Service Trust (Transfer of Trust Property) Order 1994 (S.I. 1994/896)
- B4260 Trunk Road (De-Trunking at Ross-On-Wye) Order 1994 (S.I. 1994/898)
- Medicines (Homoeopathic Medicinal Products for Human Use) Amendment Regulations 1994 (S.I. 1994/899)

== 901–1000 ==
- Local Government Act 1988 (Defined Activities) (Exemption) (Broxtowe Borough Council and Harrogate Borough Council) Order 1994 (S.I. 1994/902)
- Telecommunications Industry (Rateable Values) (Amendment) Order 1994 (S.I. 1994/903)
- Nuclear Installations (Increase of Operators' Limits of Liability) Order 1994 (S.I. 1994/909)
- Education (School Teachers' Pay and Conditions) Order 1994 (S.I. 1994/910)
- Football Grounds (Rateable Values) (Scotland) Order 1994 (S.I. 1994/911)
- Mines and Quarries (Rateable Values) (Scotland) Order 1994 (S.I. 1994/912)
- Industrial and Freight Transport (Rateable Values) (Scotland) Order 1994 (S.I. 1994/913)
- Environmentally Sensitive Areas (North Kent Marshes) Designation (Amendment) Order 1994 (S.I. 1994/918)
- Environmentally Sensitive Areas (Test Valley) Designation (Amendment) Order 1994 (S.I. 1994/919)
- Environmentally Sensitive Areas (Suffolk River Valleys) Designation (Amendment) Order 1994 (S.I. 1994/920)
- Environmentally Sensitive Areas (Clun) Designation (Amendment) Order 1994 (S.I. 1994/921)
- Environmentally Sensitive Areas (North Peak) Designation (Amendment) Order 1994 (S.I. 1994/922)
- Environmentally Sensitive Areas (Breckland) Designation (Amendment) Order 1994 (S.I. 1994/923)
- Environmentally Sensitive Areas (South Wessex Downs) Designation (Amendment) Order 1994 (S.I. 1994/924)
- Environmentally Sensitive Areas (Lake District) Designation (Amendment) Order 1994 (S.I. 1994/925)
- Environmentally Sensitive Areas (South West Peak) Designation (Amendment) Order 1994 (S.I. 1994/926)
- Environmentally Sensitive Areas (Avon Valley) Designation (Amendment) Order 1994 (S.I. 1994/927)
- Environmentally Sensitive Areas (Exmoor) Designation (Amendment) Order 1994 (S.I. 1994/928)
- Environmentally Sensitive Areas (The Broads) Designation (Amendment) (No. 2) Order 1994 (S.I. 1994/929)
- Environmentally Sensitive Areas (Pennine Dales) Designation (Amendment) (No. 2) Order 1994 (S.I. 1994/930)
- Environmentally Sensitive Areas (South Downs) Designation (Amendment) (No. 2) Order 1994 (S.I. 1994/931)
- Environmentally Sensitive Areas (Somerset Levels and Moors) Designation (Amendment) (No. 2) Order 1994 (S.I. 1994/932)
- Environmentally Sensitive Areas (West Penwith) Designation (Amendment) (No. 2) Order 1994 (S.I. 1994/933)
- Leasehold Reform, Housing and Urban Development Act 1993 (Commencement No. 4) Order 1994 (S.I. 1994/935)
- Education (Grant-maintained Schools) (Finance) Regulations 1994 (S.I. 1994/938)
- Petroleum Revenue Tax (Nomination Scheme for Disposals and Appropriations) (Amendment) Regulations 1994 (S.I. 1994/939)
- Racing Pigeons (Vaccination) Order 1994 (S.I. 1994/944)
- Swansea National Health Service Trust (Transfer of Trust Property) Order 1994 (S.I. 1994/945)
- Arable Area Payments Regulations 1994 (S.I. 1994/947)
- Local Government Superannuation (Greater Manchester Buses Limited) Regulations 1994 (S.I. 1994/948)
- Foreign Companies (Execution of Documents) Regulations 1994 (S.I. 1994/950)
- Milk Marketing Board Scheme of Reorganisation (Further Extension of Period for Application) Order 1994 (S.I. 1994/951)
- Public Telecommunication System Designation (Comment Cablevision Worcester Limited) Order 1994 (S.I. 1994/952)
- Public Telecommunication System Designation (Videotron City and Westminster Limited) Order 1994 (S.I. 1994/953)
- Public Telecommunication System Designation (Telecom Securicor Cellular Radio Limited) Order 1994 (S.I. 1994/954)
- Travellers' Allowances Order 1994 (S.I. 1994/955)
- Gaming Act (Variation of Monetary Limits) Order 1994 (S.I. 1994/956)
- Gaming Act (Variation of Monetary Limits) (No.2) Order 1994 (S.I. 1994/957)
- Gaming Clubs (Hours and Charges) (Amendment) Regulations 1994 (S.I. 1994/958)
- Education (Individual Pupils' Achievements) (Information) (Wales) Regulations 1994 (S.I. 1994/959)
- Food Labelling (Scotland) Amendment Regulations 1994 (S.I. 1994/960)
- Local Government (Committees) (Devon and Cornwall) Regulations 1994 (S.I. 1994/961)
- Grants to the Redundant Churches Fund Order 1994 (S.I. 1994/962)
- Local Government Superannuation (Greater Manchester Buses North Limited) Regulations 1994 (S.I. 1994/963)
- Official Secrets (Prohibited Places) Order 1994 S.I. 1994/968)
- Combined Probation Areas (Lancashire) Order 1994 (S.I. 1994/969)
- Channel Tunnel (Application of Road Traffic Enactments) (No. 2) Order 1994 (S.I. 1994/970)
- Three Valleys, Rickmansworth and Colne Valley Water (Amendment of Local Enactments etc.) Order 1994 (S.I. 1994/977)
- Suffolk and Essex Water (Amendment of Local Enactments etc.) Order 1994 (S.I. 1994/978)
- Materials and Articles in Contact with Food (Amendment) Regulations 1994 (S.I. 1994/979)
- East Cheshire National Health Service Trust (Transfer of Trust Property) Order 1994 (S.I. 1994/986)
- North Warwickshire National Health Service Trust (Transfer of Trust Property) Order 1994 (S.I. 1994/987)
- North East Essex Mental Health National Health Service Trust (Transfer of Trust Property) Order 1994 (S.I. 1994/988)
- Two Shires Ambulance National Health Service Trust (Transfer of Trust Property) Order 1994 (S.I. 1994/989)
- East Berkshire Community Health National Health Service Trust (Transfer of Trust Property) Order 1994 (S.I. 1994/990)
- Heatherwood and Wexham Park Hospitals' National Health Service Trust(Transfer of Trust Property) Order 1994 (S.I. 1994/991)
- East Berkshire National Health Service Trust for People with Learning Disabilities (Transfer of Trust Property) Order 1994 (S.I. 1994/992)
- East Surrey Hospital and Community Healthcare National Health Service Trust(Transfer of Trust Property) Order 1994 (S.I. 1994/993)
- Southend Health Care Services National Health Service Trust (Transfer of Trust Property) Order 1994 (S.I. 1994/994)
- Southend Community Care Services National Health Service Trust (Transfer of Trust Property) Order 1994 (S.I. 1994/995)
- Advice and Assistance (Financial Conditions) (Scotland) Regulations 1994 (S.I. 1994/997)
- Civil Legal Aid (Financial Conditions) (Scotland) Regulations 1994 (S.I. 1994/998)
- Railways (Rateable Values) (Amendment) Order 1994 (S.I. 1994/999)
- Advice and Assistance (Assistance by Way of Representation) (Scotland) Amendment Regulations 1994 (S.I. 1994/1000)

== 1001–1100 ==
- Criminal Legal Aid (Scotland) (Prescribed Proceedings) Regulations 1994 (S.I. 1994/1001)
- Highways (Assessment of Environmental Effects) Regulations 1994 (S.I. 1994/1002)
- Housing Benefit (General) AmendmentRegulations 1994 (S.I. 1994/1003)
- Income Support (General) Amendment Regulations 1994 (S.I. 1994/1004)
- Development Board for Rural Wales (Transfer of Housing Stock) (Amendment) Regulations 1994 (S.I. 1994/1005)
- Public Telecommunication System Designation (Insight Communications Guildford Limited) Order 1994 (S.I. 1994/1006)
- Public Telecommunication System Designation (Insight Communications Cardiff Limited) Order 1994 (S.I. 1994/1007)
- Public Telecommunication System Designation (NORWEB plc) Order 1994 (S.I. 1994/1008)
- A30 Trunk Road (Honiton to Exeter Improvement and Slip Roads) Order 1994 (S.I. 1994/1009)
- A30 Trunk Road (Honiton to Exeter Improvement)(Detrunking) Order 1994 (S.I. 1994/1010)
- M5 Motorway (Junction 29 and the A30 Trunk Road Honiton to Exeter Improvement) (Slip Roads Special Roads) Scheme 1994 (S.I. 1994/1011)
- Injuries in War (Shore Employments) Compensation (Amendment) Scheme 1994 (S.I. 1994/1012)
- Crofting Counties Agricultural Grants (Scotland) Amendment Scheme 1994 (S.I. 1994/1013)
- Crofters etc. Livestock Purchase Loans (Scotland) Revocation Scheme 1994 (S.I. 1994/1014)
- Civil Legal Aid (Scotland) (Fees) Amendment Regulations 1994 (S.I. 1994/1015)
- Legal Aid in Contempt of Court Proceedings (Scotland) Amendment Regulations 1994 (S.I. 1994/1016)
- Legal Aid (Scotland) (Children) Amendment Regulations 1994 (S.I. 1994/1017)
- Legal Aid in Contempt of Court Proceedings (Scotland) (Fees) Amendment Regulations 1994 (S.I. 1994/1018)
- Criminal Legal Aid (Scotland) (Fees) Amendment Regulations 1994 (S.I. 1994/1019)
- M1-A1 Link (Belle Isle To Bramham Crossroads Section and Connecting Roads) Scheme 1994 (S.I. 1994/1020)
- M1 Motorway (Belle Isle) Scheme 1994 (S.I. 1994/1021)
- A64 Trunk Road (Bramham Crossroads) Order 1994 (S.I. 1994/1022)
- M62/M1 Motorway (Lofthouse Interchange Diversion and Connecting Road) Scheme 1994 (S.I. 1994/1023)
- A63 Trunk Road (Selby Road Junction) Order 1994 (S.I. 1994/1024)
- A1 Trunk Road (Lengths of A1 Carriageway at Micklefield and Bramham) (Detrunking) Order 1994 (S.I. 1994/1025)
- Poultry Meat, Farmed Game Bird Meat and Rabbit Meat (Hygiene and Inspection) Regulations 1994 (S.I. 1994/1029)
- A23 Trunk Road (Coulsdon Inner Relief Road, Trunk Road and Slip Roads) Order 1994 (S.I. 1994/1037)
- A23 Trunk Road (Coulsdon Inner Relief Road) (Detrunking) Order 1994 (S.I. 1994/1038)
- British Railways Act 1990 (Arpley Chord) (Extension of Time) Order 1994 (S.I. 1994/1039)
- Education (Groups of Grant–maintained Schools) Regulations 1994 (S.I. 1994/1041)
- Gaming Clubs (Hours and Charges) (Scotland) Amendment Regulations 1994 (S.I. 1994/1042)
- Gaming Act (Variation of Monetary Limits) (Scotland) Order 1994 (S.I. 1994/1043)
- Parliamentary Elections (Returning Officers Charges) Order 1994 (S.I. 1994/1044)
- Secure Tenants (Right to Repair) (Scotland) Regulations 1994 (S.I. 1994/1046)
- Education (Special Educational Needs) Regulations 1994 (S.I. 1994/1047)
- Education (Special Educational Needs) (Information) Regulations 1994 (S.I. 1994/1048)
- Civil Legal Aid (Scotland) Amendment Regulations 1994 (S.I. 1994/1049)
- Criminal Legal Aid (Scotland) Amendment Regulations 1994 (S.I. 1994/1050)
- Ashford Hospital National Health Service Trust (Transfer of Trust Property) Order 1994 (S.I. 1994/1053)
- United Leeds Teaching Hospitals National Health Service Trust (Transfer of Trust Property) Order 1994 (S.I. 1994/1054)
- National Lottery etc. Act 1993 (Commencement No. 2 and Transitional Provisions) Order 1994 (S.I. 1994/1055)
- Waste Management Licensing Regulations 1994 (S.I. 1994/1056)
- Surface Waters (River Ecosystem) (Classification) Regulations 1994 (S.I. 1994/1057)
- Teachers Superannuation (Amendment) Regulations 1994 (S.I. 1994/1058)
- Teachers (Compensation for Redundancy and Premature Retirement) (Amendment) Regulations 1994 (S.I. 1994/1059)
- Advice and Assistance (Scotland) Amendment Regulations 1994 (S.I. 1994/1061)
- Occupational and Personal Pension Schemes (Consequential Amendments) Regulations 1994 (S.I. 1994/1062)
- Child Abduction and Custody(Parties to Conventions) (Amendment)(No. 2)Order 1994 (S.I. 1994/1063)
- Wireless Telegraphy (Guernsey) Order 1994 (S.I. 1994/1064)
- European Convention on Cinematographic Co-production Order 1994 (S.I. 1994/1065)
- Electricity (Class Exemptions from the Requirement for a Licence) (Amendment) Order 1994 (S.I. 1994/1070)
- Public Telecommunication System Designation (NYNEX CableComms Wessex) Order 1994 (S.I. 1994/1071)
- Public Telecommunication System Designation (United Artists Communications (London South) PLC) Order 1994 (S.I. 1994/1072)
- Social Security (Adjudication) Amendment Regulations 1994 (S.I. 1994/1082)
- Education (Schools Conducted by Education Associations) (Amendment) Regulations 1994 (S.I. 1994/1083)
- Education (Special Schools Conducted by Education Associations) Regulations 1994 (S.I. 1994/1084)
- Education (Schools Conducted by Education Associations) (Initial Articles of Government) (Amendment) Regulations 1994 (S.I. 1994/1085)
- Westcountry Ambulance Services National Health Service Trust (Transfer of Trust Property) Order 1994 (S.I. 1994/1086)
- London Cab Order 1994 (S.I. 1994/1087)
- A629/A650 Trunk Road (Kildwick to Crossflatts) (Detrunking) Order 1994 (S.I. 1994/1088)
- European Parliamentary Elections Act 1993 (Commencement) Order 1994 (S.I. 1994/1089)
- Registration of Restrictive Trading Agreements (EEC Documents) (Revocation) Regulations 1994 (S.I. 1994/1095)
- Environmental Protection Act 1990 (Commencement No. 15) Order 1994 (S.I. 1994/1096)

== 1101–1200 ==
- Social Security (Sickness and Invalidity Benefit and Severe Disablement Allowance) Miscellaneous Amendments Regulations 1994 (S.I. 1994/1101)
- Ministry of Defence Police (Police Committee) (Amendment) Regulations 1994 (S.I. 1994/1102)
- District Probate Registries (Amendment) Order 1994 (S.I. 1994/1103)
- Merchant Shipping (Radio) (Fishing Vessels) (Amendment) Rules 1994 (S.I. 1994/1104)
- Social Security Revaluation of Earnings Factors Order 1994 (S.I. 1994/1105)
- Academic Awards and Distinctions (The Royal Scottish Academy of Music and Drama) (Scotland) Order of Council 1994 (S.I. 1994/1125)
- Land Registration (Execution of Deeds) Rules 1994 (S.I. 1994/1130)
- Integrated Administration and Control System (Amendment) Regulations 1994 (S.I. 1994/1134)
- Transfrontier Shipment of Waste Regulations 1994 (S.I. 1994/1137)
- Act of Sederunt (Rules of the Court of Session Amendment No.1) (Fees of Solicitors) 1994 (S.I. 1994/1139)
- Act of Sederunt (Rules of the Court of Session Amendment No.2) (Shorthand Writers' Fees) 1994 (S.I. 1994/1140)
- Act of Sederunt (Fees of Shorthand Writers in the Sheriff Court) 1994 (S.I. 1994/1141)
- Act of Sederunt (Fees of Solicitors in the Sheriff Court) (Amendment) 1994 (S.I. 1994/1142)
- Wildlife and Countryside Act 1981 (Variation of Schedule 4) Order 1994 (S.I. 1994/1151)
- Wildlife and Countryside (Registration and Ringing of Certain Captive Birds) (Amendment) Regulations 1994 (S.I. 1994/1152)
- Local Government Act 1988 (Defined Activities) (Exemption) (Brighton Borough Council and East Yorkshire Borough Council) Order 1994 (S.I. 1994/1167)
- National Lottery (Revocation of Licences) Procedure Regulations 1994 (S.I. 1994/1170)
- Education (School Performance Information) (Wales) Regulations 1994 (S.I. 1994/1186)
- Land Compensation (Additional Development) (Forms) (Scotland) Regulations 1994 (S.I. 1994/1187)
- Value Added Tax (Education) Order 1994 (S.I. 1994/1188)
- Gipsy Encampments (District of Wychavon) Order 1994 (S.I. 1994/1189)
- Public Telecommunication System Designation (Bradford Cable Communications Limited) Order 1994 (S.I. 1994/1190)
- Export of Goods (Control) Order 1994 (S.I. 1994/1191)
- HMSO Trading Fund (Amendment) Order 1994 (S.I. 1994/1192)
- Education (Groups of Grant-maintained Schools) (Finance) Regulations 1994 (S.I. 1994/1195)
- National Lottery (Licence Fees) Order 1994 (S.I. 1994/1200)

== 1201–1300 ==
- Merchant Shipping Act 1988 (Commencement No. 4) Order 1994 (S.I. 1994/1201)
- Public Telecommunication System Designation(Sprint Holding (UK) Limited) Order 1994 (S.I. 1994/1202)
- Public Telecommunication System Designation (WORLDCOM INTERNATIONAL, INC) Order 1994 (S.I. 1994/1203)
- Public Telecommunication System Designation (Telstra (UK) Limited) Order 1994 (S.I. 1994/1204)
- Warrington Hospital National Health Service Trust (Transfer of Trust Property) Order 1994 (S.I. 1994/1205)
- Warrington Community Health Care National Health Service Trust (Transfer of Trust Property) Order 1994 (S.I. 1994/1206)
- Goods Vehicles (Operators' Licences, Qualifications and Fees) (Amendment) Regulations 1994 (S.I. 1994/1209)
- Isle of Wight (Structural Change) Order 1994 (S.I. 1994/1210)
- Halton General Hospital National Health Service Trust (Transfer of Trust Property) Order 1994 (S.I. 1994/1211)
- Income Tax (Employments) (Notional Payments) Regulations 1994 (S.I. 1994/1212)
- Cycle Racing on Highways (Tour de France 1994) Regulations 1994 (S.I. 1994/1226)
- Service Subsidy Agreements (Tendering) (Amendment) Regulations 1994 (S.I. 1994/1227)
- Probation (Amendment) Rules 1994 (S.I. 1994/1228)
- Maternity Allowance and Statutory Maternity Pay Regulations 1994 (S.I. 1994/1230)
- Education (Grant-maintained Special Schools) (Amendment) Regulations 1994 (S.I. 1994/1231)
- Education (Maintained Special Schools becoming Grant-maintained Special Schools) (Ballot Information) Regulations 1994 (S.I. 1994/1232)
- Civil Legal Aid (Scotland) (Fees) Amendment (No. 2) Regulations 1994 (S.I. 1994/1233)
- Charities (The Royal Philanthropic Society) Order 1994 (S.I. 1994/1235)
- Education (Special Educational Needs) (Amendment) Regulations 1994 (S.I. 1994/1251)
- Finance Act 1994, Section 47, (Appointed Day) (No. 2) Order 1994 (S.I. 1994/1253)
- Education (Inner London Education Authority) (Property Transfer) (Amendment) Order 1994 (S.I. 1994/1255)
- Education (Information as to Provision of Education) (England) Regulations 1994 (S.I. 1994/1256)
- Finance Act 1994, section 45, (Appointed Day) Order 1994 (S.I. 1994/1257)
- Weights and Measures (Packaged Goods) (Amendment) Regulations 1994 (S.I. 1994/1258)
- Measuring Equipment (Capacity Measures) (Amendment) Regulations 1994 (S.I. 1994/1259)
- National Health Service (District Health Authorities) (No. 2) Order 1994 (S.I. 1994/1260)
- National Health Service (Determination of Districts) (No. 2) Order 1994 (S.I. 1994/1261)
- Regional and District Health Authorities (Membership and Procedure) Amendment Regulations 1994 (S.I. 1994/1262)
- Collective Enfranchisement and Tenants' Audit (Qualified Surveyors) Regulations 1994 (S.I. 1994/1263)
- Motor Vehicles (Type Approval and Approval Marks) (Fees) Regulations 1994 (S.I. 1994/1265)
- Building Standards (Scotland) Amendment Regulations 1994 (S.I. 1994/1266)
- Surrey Ambulance National Health Service Trust (Change of Name) Order 1994 (S.I. 1994/1268)
- Salford Hospitals National Health Service Trust (Change of Name) Order 1994 (S.I. 1994/1269)
- Education (National Curriculum) (Exceptions in Welsh at Key Stage 4) Regulations 1994 (S.I. 1994/1270)
- Environmental Protection (Prescribed Processes and Substances Etc.) (Amendment) Regulations 1994 (S.I. 1994/1271)
- County Court (Amendment No. 2) Rules 1994 (S.I. 1994/1288)
- County Court (Forms) (Amendment) Rules 1994 (S.I. 1994/1289)
- Habitat (Water Fringe) Regulations 1994 (S.I. 1994/1291)
- Habitat (Former Set-Aside Land) Regulations 1994 (S.I. 1994/1292)
- Habitat (Salt-Marsh) Regulations 1994 (S.I. 1994/1293)
- Two Shires Ambulance National Health Service Trust (Transfer of Trust Property) (No. 2) Order 1994 (S.I. 1994/1294)
- West Berkshire Priority Care Service National Health Service Trust (Transfer of Trust Property) Order 1994 (S.I. 1994/1295)
- Royal Cornwall Hospitals National Health Service Trust (Transfer of Trust Property) Order 1994 (S.I. 1994/1296)
- Royal Berkshire and Battle Hospitals National Health Service Trust (Transfer of Trust Property) Order 1994 (S.I. 1994/1297)
- Royal Berkshire Ambulance National Health Service Trust (Transfer of Trust Property) Order 1994 (S.I. 1994/1298)
- Grimsby Health National Health Service Trust (Transfer of Trust Property) Order 1994 (S.I. 1994/1299)
- East Hertfordshire National Health Service Trust (Transfer of Trust Property) Order 1994 (S.I. 1994/1300)

== 1301–1400 ==
- Countess of Chester Hospital National Health Service Trust (Transfer of Trust Property) Order 1994 (S.I. 1994/1301)
- Farm and Conservation Grant (Variation) Scheme 1994 (S.I. 1994/1302)
- Education (Lay Members of Appeal Committees) Regulations 1994 (S.I. 1994/1303)
- Religious Education (Meetings of Local Conferences and Councils) Regulations 1994 (S.I. 1994/1304)
- Taxes (Interest Rate) (Amendment) Regulations 1994 (S.I. 1994/1307)
- Police (Amendment) Regulations 1994 (S.I. 1994/1308)
- Airedale National Health Service Trust (Transfer of Trust Property) Order 1994 (S.I. 1994/1309)
- Avon Ambulance Service National Health Service Trust (Transfer of Trust Property) Order 1994 (S.I. 1994/1310)
- Barnet Community Healthcare National Health Service Trust (Transfer of Trust Property) Order 1994 (S.I. 1994/1311)
- Chase Farm Hospitals National Health Service Trust (Transfer of Trust Property) Order 1994 (S.I. 1994/1312)
- Chorley and South Ribble National Health Service Trust (Transfer of Trust Property) Order 1994 (S.I. 1994/1313)
- Community Health Services, Southern Derbyshire National Health Service Trust (Transfer of Trust Property) Order 1994 (S.I. 1994/1314)
- Cornwall Healthcare National Health Service Trust (Transfer of Trust Property) Order 1994 (S.I. 1994/1315)
- East Sussex Health Authority (Transfer of Trust Property) Order 1994 (S.I. 1994/1316)
- Derby City General Hospital National Health Service Trust (Transfer of Trust Property) Order 1994 (S.I. 1994/1317)
- Durham County Ambulance Service National Health Service Trust (Transfer of Trust Property) Order 1994 (S.I. 1994/1318)
- Exeter and North Devon Health Authority (Transfer of Trust Property) Order 1994 (S.I. 1994/1319)
- Fosse Health, Leicestershire Community National Health Service Trust (Transfer of Trust Property) Order 1994 (S.I. 1994/1320)
- Education (Distribution by Schools of Information about Further Education Institutions) (Wales) Regulations 1994 (S.I. 1994/1321)
- Child Abduction and Custody (Parties to Conventions) (Amendment) (No. 3) Order 1994 (S.I. 1994/1322)
- Haiti (United Nations Sanctions) Order 1994 (S.I. 1994/1323)
- Haiti (United Nations Sanctions) (Dependent Territories) Order 1994 (S.I. 1994/1324)
- Haiti (United Nations Sanctions) (Channel Islands) Order 1994 (S.I. 1994/1325)
- Haiti (United Nations Sanctions) (Isle of Man) Order 1994 (S.I. 1994/1326)
- European Communities (Designation) (No. 2) Order 1994 (S.I. 1994/1327)
- South Yorkshire Light Rail Transit (Penalty Fares) (Activating) Order 1994 (S.I. 1994/1328)
- Environmental Protection (Prescribed Processes and Substances Etc.) (Amendment) (No. 2) Regulations 1994 (S.I. 1994/1329)
- A50 Trunk Road (Blythe Bridge to Queensway and Connecting Roads) (No 2) Order 1994 (S.I. 1994/1330)
- Lydney and Parkend Light Railway (Extension and Amendment) Order 1994 (S.I. 1994/1331)
- Wiltshire Ambulance Service National Health Service Trust (Transfer of Trust Property) Order 1994 (S.I. 1994/1332)
- Hereford and Worcester Ambulance Service National Health Service Trust (Transfer of Trust Property) Order 1994 (S.I. 1994/1333)
- Scunthorpe Community Health Care National Health Service Trust (Transfer of Trust Property) Order 1994 (S.I. 1994/1334)
- Scunthorpe and Goole Hospitals National Health Service Trust (Transfer of Trust Property) Order 1994 (S.I. 1994/1335)
- Southern Derbyshire Mental Health National Health Service Trust (Transfer of Trust Property) Order 1994 (S.I. 1994/1336)
- Thameslink Healthcare Services National Health Service Trust (Transfer of Trust Property) Order 1994 (S.I. 1994/1337)
- South Warwickshire Health Care National Health Service Trust (Transfer of Trust Property) Order 1994 (S.I. 1994/1338)
- West London Healthcare National Health Service Trust (Transfer of Trust Property) Order 1994 (S.I. 1994/1339)
- West Middlesex University Hospital National Health Service Trust (Transfer of Trust Property) Order 1994 (S.I. 1994/1340)
- Worcester Royal Infirmary National Health Service Trust (Transfer of Trust Property) Order 1994 (S.I. 1994/1341)
- National Lottery etc. Act 1993 (Amendment of Section 23) Order 1994 (S.I. 1994/1342)
- Bedfordshire and Hertfordshire Ambulance and Paramedic Service National Health Service Trust (Transfer of Trust Property) Order 1994 (S.I. 1994/1343)
- Road Vehicles (Registration and Licensing) (Amendment) Regulations 1994 (S.I. 1994/1364)
- Trade Union Reform and Employment Rights Act 1993 (Commencement No. 3 and Transitional Provisions) Order 1994 (S.I. 1994/1365)
- Social Security Maternity Benefits and Statutory Sick Pay (Amendment) Regulations 1994 (S.I. 1994/1367)
- Road Traffic (Special Parking Areas) (London Boroughs of Bromley, Hammersmith and Fulham and Lewisham) (Amendment No. 2) Order 1994 (S.I. 1994/1376)
- Road Traffic (Special Parking Areas) (London Borough of Richmond upon Thames) (Amendment) Order 1994 (S.I. 1994/1377)
- Road Traffic (Special Parking Areas) (London Boroughs of Camden, Hackney and Hounslow) (Amendment) Order 1994 (S.I. 1994/1378)
- European Parliamentary Elections (Returning Officers' Charges) Order 1994 (S.I. 1994/1379)
- Commissioners for Oaths (Prescribed Bodies) Regulations 1994 (S.I. 1994/1380)
- Ancient Monuments (Class Consents) Order 1994 (S.I. 1994/1381)
- Hovercraft (Fees) Regulations 1994 (S.I. 1994/1382)
- Merchant Shipping (Ro-Ro Passenger Ship Survivability) (No. 2) Regulations 1994 (S.I. 1994/1383)
- Household Appliances (Noise Emission) (Amendment) Regulations 1994 (S.I. 1994/1386)
- Cornwall Healthcare National Health Service Trust (Transfer of Trust Property) Order (No. 2) 1994 (S.I. 1994/1388)
- Local Authorities (Goods and Services) (Public Bodies) (No. 2) Order 1994 (S.I. 1994/1389)
- Channel Tunnel (Amendment of the Fisheries Act 1981) Order 1994 (S.I. 1994/1390)

== 1401–1500 ==
- A570 Trunk Road (Southport Road, Ormskirk) (40 Miles Per Hour Speed Limit) Order 1994 (S.I. 1994/1401)
- Medicines (Child Safety) Amendment Regulations 1994 (S.I. 1994/1402)
- Marketing Development Scheme 1994 (S.I. 1994/1403)
- Marketing Development Scheme (Specification of Activities) Order 1994 (S.I. 1994/1404)
- Channel Tunnel (Miscellaneous Provisions) Order 1994 (S.I. 1994/1405)
- National Health Service Trusts (Membership and Procedure) (Scotland) Amendment Regulations 1994 (S.I. 1994/1408)
- Guarantee Payments (Exemption) (No. 29) Order 1994 (S.I. 1994/1409)
- Free Zone (Southampton) Designation (Variation) Order 1994 (S.I. 1994/1410)
- Reconstitution of the Langport District Drainage Board Order 1994 (S.I. 1994/1411)
- European Parliamentary Elections (Returning Officer's Charges) (Northern Ireland) Order 1994 (S.I. 1994/1412)
- Parliamentary Elections (Returning Officer's Charges) (Northern Ireland) Order 1994 (S.I. 1994/1413)
- Education (Special Educational Needs Code of Practice) (Appointed Day) Order 1994 (S.I. 1994/1414)
- Double Taxation Relief (Taxes on Income) (United States of America Dividends) (Amendment) Regulations 1994 (S.I. 1994/1418)
- Council Tax Limitation (Sheffield City Council) (Maximum Amount) Order 1994 (S.I. 1994/1419)
- Education (School Performance Information) (England) Regulations 1994 (S.I. 1994/1420)
- Education (School Information) (England) Regulations 1994 (S.I. 1994/1421)
- Coal Industry (Restructuring Grants) Order 1994 (S.I. 1994/1422)
- Oil and Fibre Plant Seeds (Amendment) Regulations 1994 (S.I. 1994/1423)
- Home-Grown Cereals Authority (Rate of Levy) Order 1994 (S.I. 1994/1424)
- Non-Domestic Rating Contributions (England) (Amendment No. 2) Regulations 1994 (S.I. 1994/1431)
- Railway Pensions (Protection and Designation of Schemes) Order 1994 (S.I. 1994/1432)
- Railways Pension Scheme Order 1994 (S.I. 1994/1433)
- Cleveland Tertiary College (Incorporation) Order 1994 (S.I. 1994/1434)
- Cleveland Tertiary College (Government) Regulations 1994 (S.I. 1994/1435)
- Bail (Amendment) Act 1993 (Commencement) Order 1994 (S.I. 1994/1437)
- Bail (Amendment) Act 1993 (Prescription of Prosecuting Authorities) Order 1994 (S.I. 1994/1438)
- Local Government (Direct Labour Organisations) (Competition) (Amendment) (England) Regulations 1994 (S.I. 1994/1439)
- Wells Harbour Revision Order 1994 (S.I. 1994/1440)
- Plant Health Fees (Scotland) Order 1994 (S.I. 1994/1441)
- Town and Country Planning (General Permitted Development) (Scotland) Amendment Order 1994 (S.I. 1994/1442)
- Act of Sederunt (Rules of the Court of Session 1994) 1994 (S.I. 1994/1443)
- Rules of the Air (Third Amendment) Regulations 1994 (S.I. 1994/1444)
- Local Government Act 1992 (Commencement No. 4) Order 1994 (S.I. 1994/1445)
- Milk and Dairies and Milk (Special Designation) (Charges) (Amendment) Regulations 1994 (S.I. 1994/1446)
- Diseases of Fish (Control) Regulations 1994 (S.I. 1994/1447)
- Fish Health (Amendment) Regulations 1994 (S.I. 1994/1448)
- Education (Further Education Corporations) Order 1994 (S.I. 1994/1449)
- Coleg Menai (Government) Regulations 1994 (S.I. 1994/1450)
- Civil Aviation (Route Charges for Navigation Services) (Third Amendment) Regulations 1994 (S.I. 1994/1468)
- Legal Aid in Criminal and Care Proceedings (Costs) (Amendment) Regulations 1994 (S.I. 1994/1477)
- Education (Gwynedd Technical College and Coleg Pencraig) (Dissolution) Order 1994 (S.I. 1994/1478)
- Income Tax (Definition of Unit Trust Scheme) (Amendment) Regulations 1994 (S.I. 1994/1479)
- Crown Court (Amendment) Rules 1994 (S.I. 1994/1480)
- Magistrates' Courts (Bail) (Amendment) Rules 1994 (S.I. 1994/1481)
- Road Traffic Act 1991 (Commencement No. 11 and Transitional Provisions) Order 1994 (S.I. 1994/1482)
- Road Traffic Act 1991 (Commencement No. 12 and Transitional Provisions) Order 1994 (S.I. 1994/1484)
- Flavourings in Food (Amendment) Regulations 1994 (S.I. 1994/1486)
- Road Traffic (Special Parking Area) (London Borough of Bexley) Order 1994 (S.I. 1994/1487)
- Road Traffic (Special Parking Area) (London Borough of Barking and Dagenham) Order 1994 (S.I. 1994/1488)
- Road Traffic (Special Parking Area) (London Borough of Ealing) Order 1994 (S.I. 1994/1489)
- Road Traffic (Special Parking Area) (London Borough of Croydon) Order 1994 (S.I. 1994/1490)
- Road Traffic (Special Parking Area) (City of London) Order 1994 (S.I. 1994/1491)
- Road Traffic (Special Parking Area) (London Borough of Haringey) Order 1994 (S.I. 1994/1492)
- Road Traffic (Special Parking Area) (London Borough of Harrow) Order 1994 (S.I. 1994/1493)
- Road Traffic (Special Parking Area) (London Borough of Havering) Order 1994 (S.I. 1994/1494)
- Road Traffic (Special Parking Area) (London Borough of Greenwich) Order 1994 (S.I. 1994/1495)
- Road Traffic (Special Parking Area) (London Borough of Enfield) Order 1994 (S.I. 1994/1496)
- Road Traffic (Special Parking Area) (Royal Borough of Kingston upon Thames) Order 1994 (S.I. 1994/1497)
- Road Traffic (Special Parking Area) (Royal Borough of Kensington and Chelsea) Order 1994 (S.I. 1994/1498)
- Road Traffic (Special Parking Area) (London Borough of Islington) Order 1994 (S.I. 1994/1499)
- Road Traffic (Special Parking Area) (London Borough of Hillingdon) Order 1994 (S.I. 1994/1500)

== 1501–1600 ==
- Road Traffic (Special Parking Area) (London Borough of Waltham Forest) Order 1994 (S.I. 1994/1501)
- Road Traffic (Special Parking Area) (London Borough of Brent) Order 1994 (S.I. 1994/1502)
- Removal and Disposal of Vehicles (Amendment) Regulations 1994 (S.I. 1994/1503)
- Road Traffic (Special Parking Area) (City of Westminster) Order 1994 (S.I. 1994/1504)
- Road Traffic (Special Parking Areas) (London Borough of Barnet) Order 1994 (S.I. 1994/1505)
- Road Traffic (Special Parking Area) (London Borough of Newham) Order 1994 (S.I. 1994/1506)
- Road Traffic (Special Parking Area) (London Borough of Sutton) Order 1994 (S.I. 1994/1507)
- Road Traffic (Special Parking Areas) (London Borough of Lambeth) Order 1994 (S.I. 1994/1508)
- Road Traffic (Special Parking Area) (London Borough of Redbridge) Order 1994 (S.I. 1994/1509)
- Road Traffic (Special Parking Area) (London Borough of Merton) Order 1994 (S.I. 1994/1510)
- Children's Homes Amendment Regulations 1994 (S.I. 1994/1511)
- Insurance Companies (Accounts and Statements) (Amendment) Regulations 1994 (S.I. 1994/1515)
- Insurance Companies Regulations 1994 (S.I. 1994/1516)
- Financial Services Act 1986 (Miscellaneous Exemptions) Order 1994 (S.I. 1994/1517)
- Private Medical Insurance (Disentitlement to Tax Relief and Approved Benefits) Regulations 1994 (S.I. 1994/1518)
- Traffic Signs Regulations and General Directions 1994 (S.I. 1994/1519)
- Education (National Curriculum) (Attainment Targets and Programmes of Study in Science) (Amendment) Order 1994 (S.I. 1994/1520)
- Private Medical Insurance (Tax Relief) (Amendment) Regulations 1994 (S.I. 1994/1527)
- Suckler Cow Premium (Amendment) Regulations 1994 (S.I. 1994/1528)
- Cosmetic Products (Safety) (Amendment) Regulations 1994 (S.I. 1994/1529)
- Medicines (Medicated Animal Feeding Stuffs) (Amendment) Regulations 1994 (S.I. 1994/1531)
- Railtrack (Marsh Lane, Leeds, Footbridge) Order 1994 (S.I. 1994/1532)
- Reservoirs (Panels of Civil Engineers) (Application Fees) (Amendment) Regulations 1994 (S.I. 1994/1533)
- West Lindsey National Health Service Trust (Establishment) Amendment Order 1994 (S.I. 1994/1534)
- National Health Service (Charges to Overseas Visitors) (Amendment) Regulations 1994 (S.I. 1994/1535)
- Civil Courts (Amendment No. 2) Order 1994 (S.I. 1994/1536)
- Combined Probation Areas (Gloucestershire) S.I. 1994/1542)
- Combined Probation Areas (Oxfordshire) S.I. 1994/1543)
- Social Security (Contributions) Amendment (No. 2) Regulations 1994 (S.I. 1994/1553)
- Medicines (Fees Relating to Medicinal Products for Animal Use) Regulations 1994 (S.I. 1994/1554)
- Ashford Hospitals National Health Service Trust (Establishment) Amendment Order 1994 (S.I. 1994/1555)
- Strathclyde Regional Council (Kilduskland) Water Order 1994 (S.I. 1994/1556)
- Anti-Competitive Practices (Exclusions) (Amendment) Order 1994 (S.I. 1994/1557)
- Education Act 1993 (Commencement No. 4) Order 1994 (S.I. 1994/1558)
- Blackburn, Hyndburn and Ribble Valley Health Care National Health Service Trust (Transfer of Trust Property) Order 1994 (S.I. 1994/1559)
- CommuniCare National Health Service Trust (Transfer of Trust Property) Order 1994 (S.I. 1994/1560)
- Harrow and Hillingdon Healthcare National Health Service Trust (Transfer of Trust Property) Order 1994 (S.I. 1994/1561)
- Leeds Community and Mental Health Services Teaching National Health Service Trust (Transfer of Trust Property) Order 1994 (S.I. 1994/1562)
- Maidstone Priority Care National Health Service Trust (Transfer of Trust Property) Order 1994 (S.I. 1994/1563)
- Peterborough Hospitals National Health Service Trust (Transfer of Trust Property) Order 1994 (S.I. 1994/1564)
- A23 Trunk Road (Purley Way, Croydon) (Box Junction) Order 1994 (S.I. 1994/1566)
- Taxes (Interest Rate) (Amendment No. 2) Regulations 1994 (S.I. 1994/1567)
- Fishing Vessels (Decommissioning) Scheme 1994 (S.I. 1994/1568)
- Northern Ireland (Emergency and Prevention of Terrorism Provisions)(Continuance) Order 1994 (S.I. 1994/1569)
- Motor Vehicles (EC Type Approval) (Amendment) (No.2) Regulations 1994 (S.I. 1994/1570)
- Gloucestershire Ambulance Service National Health Service Trust (Transfer of Trust Property) Order 1994 (S.I. 1994/1571)
- Bromley Hospitals National Health Service Trust (Transfer of Trust Property) Order 1994 (S.I. 1994/1572)
- Mid Kent Healthcare National Health Service Trust (Transfer of Trust Property) Order 1994 (S.I. 1994/1573)
- Shropshire's Mental Health National Health Service Trust (Transfer of Trust Property) Order 1994 (S.I. 1994/1574)
- Wellhouse National Health Service Trust (Transfer of Trust Property) Order 1994 (S.I. 1994/1575)
- North West Anglia Health Care National Health Service Trust (Transfer of Trust Property) Order 1994 (S.I. 1994/1576)

== 1601–1700 ==
- Civil Aviation (Canadian Navigation Services) (Fifth Amendment) Regulations 1994 (S.I. 1994/1601)
- Education (Mandatory Awards) (Amendment) Regulations 1994 (S.I. 1994/1606)
- Central Scotland Healthcare National Health Service Trust (Establishment) Order 1994 (S.I. 1994/1607)
- Income-related Benefits Schemes (Miscellaneous Amendments) (No.2) Regulations 1994 (S.I. 1994/1608)
- Patents County Court (Designation and Jurisdiction) Order 1994 (S.I. 1994/1609)
- Feedingstuffs (Sampling and Analysis) (Amendment) Regulations 1994 (S.I. 1994/1610)
- Road Traffic (Special Parking Area) (London Borough of Tower Hamlets) Order 1994 (S.I. 1994/1613)
- London—Fishguard Trunk Road (A40) (Whitland By–Pass) Order 1994 (S.I. 1994/1614)
- Industrial Tribunals Extension of Jurisdiction (England and Wales) Order 1994 (S.I. 1994/1623)
- Industrial Tribunals Extension of Jurisdiction (Scotland) Order 1994 (S.I. 1994/1624)
- Export of Goods (Control) Order 1994 (Amendment) Order 1994 (S.I. 1994/1632)
- Education (Chief Inspector of Schools in England) Order 1994 (S.I. 1994/1633)
- British Nationality (South Africa) Order 1994 (S.I. 1994/1634)
- Criminal Justice (International Co-operation) (Anguilla) Order 1994 (S.I. 1994/1635)
- South Africa (United Nations Arms Embargo) (Prohibited Transactions) Revocations Order 1994 (S.I. 1994/1636)
- United Nations Arms Embargoes (Amendment) (Rwanda) Order 1994 (S.I. 1994/1637)
- Virgin Islands (Constitution) (Amendment) Order 1994 (S.I. 1994/1638)
- Criminal Justice Act 1988 (Designated Countries and Territories) (Amendment) Order 1994 (S.I. 1994/1639)
- Criminal Justice (International Co-operation) Act 1990 (Enforcement of Overseas Forfeiture Orders) (Amendment) Order 1994 (S.I. 1994/1640)
- Drug Trafficking Offences Act 1986 (Designated Countries and Territories) (Amendment) Order 1994 (S.I. 1994/1641)
- International Headquarters and Defence Organisations (Designation and Privileges) (Amendment) Order 1994 (S.I. 1994/1642)
- Visiting Forces and International Headquarters (Application of Law) (Amendment) Order 1994 (S.I. 1994/1643)
- Confiscation of the Proceeds of Drug Trafficking (Designated Countries and Territories) (Scotland) Amendment Order 1994 (S.I. 1994/1644)
- Criminal Justice (International Co-operation) Act 1990 (Enforcement of Overseas Forfeiture Orders) (Scotland) Amendment Order 1994 (S.I. 1994/1645)
- Social Security (Cyprus) Order 1994 (S.I. 1994/1646)
- Lancaster Port Commission Harbour Revision Order 1994 (S.I. 1994/1647)
- Railways Act 1993 (Commencement No. 5 and Transitional Provisions) Order 1994 (S.I. 1994/1648)
- Railways Act 1993 (Consequential Modifications) (No. 2) Order 1994 (S.I. 1994/1649)
- Bournemouth and West Hampshire Water (Amendment of Local Enactments etc.) Order 1994 (S.I. 1994/1650)
- Social Security Act 1989 (Commencement No. 5) Order 1994 (S.I. 1994/1661)
- European Parliamentary (United Kingdom Representatives) Pensions (Consolidation and Amendment) Order 1994 (S.I. 1994/1662)
- European Parliament (Pay and Pensions) Act 1979 (Section 3 (Amendment) Order 1994 (S.I. 1994/1663)
- Football Spectators (Seating) Order 1994 (S.I. 1994/1666)
- Channel Tunnel (Application of Road Traffic Enactments) (No. 2) Order 1994 (S.I. 1994/1667)
- Local Government Act 1988 (Competition) (Defined Activities) (Housing Management) Order 1994 (S.I. 1994/1671)
- Education (School Teachers' Pay and Conditions) (No. 2) Order 1994 (S.I. 1994/1673)
- Mental Health (Class of Nurse) (Scotland) Order 1994 (S.I. 1994/1675)
- Sea Fishing (Enforcement of Community Quota Measures) Order 1994 (S.I. 1994/1679)
- Sea Fishing (Enforcement of Community Conservation Measures) (Amendment) (No. 6) Order 1994 (S.I. 1994/1680)
- Third Country Fishing (Enforcement) Order 1994 (S.I. 1994/1681)
- Cheshire County Council (Trent and Mersey Canal Bridge, Wheelock) Scheme 1993 Confirmation Instrument 1994 (S.I. 1994/1682)
- Electricity (Class Exemptions from the Requirement for a Licence) (Amendment) (No. 2) Order 1994 (S.I. 1994/1683)
- Essex County Council (Haven Road Bridge) Scheme 1993 Confirmation Instrument 1994 (S.I. 1994/1688)
- Finance Act 1994, section 7, (Appointed Day) Order 1994 (S.I. 1994/1690)
- North Killingholme Haven Harbour Empowerment Order 1994 (S.I. 1994/1693)
- Youth Courts (London) Order 1994 (S.I. 1994/1695)
- Insurance Companies (Third Insurance Directives) Regulations 1994 (S.I. 1994/1696)
- Education (Amount to Follow Permanently Excluded Pupil) Regulations 1994 (S.I. 1994/1697)
- Insurance Premium Tax (Taxable Insurance Contracts) Order 1994 (S.I. 1994/1698)

== 1701–1800 ==
- Organic Aid (Scotland) Regulations 1994 (S.I. 1994/1701)
- Teaching Council (Scotland) Election Amendment Scheme 1994 Approval Order 1994 (S.I. 1994/1702)
- Organic Farming (Aid) Regulations 1994 (S.I. 1994/1712)
- Duncan of Jordanstone College of Art (Closure) (Scotland) Order 1994 (S.I. 1994/1715)
- Rabies (Importation of Dogs, Cats and Other Mammals) (Amendment) Order 1994 (S.I. 1994/1716)
- A570 St. Helens-Ormskirk-Southport Trunk Road (Moor Street and St. Helens Road, Ormskirk) (Detrunking) Order 1994 (S.I. 1994/1719)
- Organic Farming (Aid) Regulations 1994 (S.I. 1994/1721)
- Nitrate Sensitive Areas Regulations 1994 (S.I. 1994/1729)
- Metropolitan Police Force (Compensation for Loss of Office) Regulations 1994 (S.I. 1994/1730)
- Access for Community Air Carriers to Intra-Community Air Routes (Second Amendment and other Provisions) Regulations 1994 (S.I. 1994/1731)
- Licensing of Air Carriers (Third Amendment and other Provisions) Regulations 1994 (S.I. 1994/1732)
- Civil Aviation (Personnel Licences) Order 1992 (Amendment) Regulations 1994 (S.I. 1994/1733)
- Aeroplane Noise (Limitation on Operation of Aeroplanes) (Amendment) Regulations 1994 (S.I. 1994/1734)
- Air Fares (Third Amendment) Regulations 1994 (S.I. 1994/1735)
- Airports Slot Allocation (Second Amendment) Regulations 1994 (S.I. 1994/1736)
- Aircraft Operators (Accounts and Records) Regulations 1994 (S.I. 1994/1737)
- Air Passenger Duty Regulations 1994 (S.I. 1994/1738)
- Customs Duties (ECSC) (Quota and other Reliefs) (No. 2) Order 1994 (S.I. 1994/1739)
- Portsmouth College of Art, Design and Further Education (Dissolution) Order 1994 (S.I. 1994/1741)
- Non–Domestic Rating Contributions (Wales) (Amendment) (No. 2) Regulations 1994 (S.I. 1994/1742)
- Education (National Curriculum) (Attainment Targets and Programmes of Study in History) (Wales) (Amendment) Order 1994 (S.I. 1994/1743)
- Education (National Curriculum) (Attainment Targets and Programmes of Study in Geography) (Wales) (Amendment) Order 1994 (S.I. 1994/1744)
- Council Tax (Alteration of Lists and Appeals) (Amendment) Regulations 1994 (S.I. 1994/1746)
- Council Tax (Situation and Valuation of Dwellings) (Amendment) Regulations 1994 (S.I. 1994/1747)
- Race Relations (Interest on Awards) Regulations 1994 (S.I. 1994/1748)
- Protected Rights (Transfer Payment) Amendment Regulations 1994 (S.I. 1994/1751)
- River Humber (Upper Burcom Cooling Works) Order 1994 (S.I. 1994/1753)
- Epsom School of Art and Design (Dissolution) Order 1994 (S.I. 1994/1754)
- Cleveland College of Further Education and Sir William Turners Sixth Form College, Redcar (Dissolution) Order 1994 (S.I. 1994/1755)
- Criminal Justice (International Co-operation) Act 1990 (Crown Servants) Regulations 1994 (S.I. 1994/1756)
- Drug Trafficking Offences Act 1986 (Crown Servants and Regulators etc.) Regulations 1994 (S.I. 1994/1757)
- Prevention of Terrorism (Temporary Provisions) Act 1989 (Crown Servants and Regulators etc.) Regulations 1994 (S.I. 1994/1758)
- Criminal Justice Act 1988(Crown Servants) Regulations 1994 (S.I. 1994/1759)
- Northern Ireland (Emergency Provisions) Act 1991 (Crown Servants and Regulators etc.) Regulations 1994 (S.I. 1994/1760)
- Wirral Tramway Light Railway Order 1994 (S.I. 1994/1761)
- Housing (Right to Buy) (Priority of Charges) Order 1994 (S.I. 1994/1762)
- Mortgage Indemnities (Recognised Bodies) Order 1994 (S.I. 1994/1763)
- Plugs and Sockets etc. (Safety) Regulations 1994 (S.I. 1994/1768)
- Act of Adjournal (Consolidation Amendment) (Miscellaneous) 1994 (S.I. 1994/1769)
- National Health Service (Charges to Overseas Visitors) (Scotland) Amendment Regulations 1994 (S.I. 1994/1770)
- Ecclesiastical Exemption (Listed Buildings and Conservation Areas) Order 1994 (S.I. 1994/1771)
- Northern Ireland Act 1974 (Interim Period Extension) Order 1994 (S.I. 1994/1772)
- Finance Act 1994 (Appointed Day) Order 1994 (S.I. 1994/1773)
- Insurance Premium Tax Regulations 1994 (S.I. 1994/1774)
- Human Fertilisation and Embryology Act 1990 (Commencement No. 5) Order 1994 (S.I. 1994/1776)
- Severn Bridge (Amendment) Regulations 1994 (S.I. 1994/1777)
- Lerwick Harbour Revision Order 1994 (S.I. 1994/1778)
- Social Security (Attendance Allowance and Disability Living Allowance) (Amendment) Regulations 1994 (S.I. 1994/1779)
- A20 Trunk Road (Sidcup Road, Greenwich) (Prohibition of Use of Gaps in Central Reservation) Order 1994 (S.I. 1994/1780)

== 1801–1900 ==
- Chinnor and Princes Risborough Railway Order 1994 (S.I. 1994/1803)
- Notification of Existing Substances (Enforcement) Regulations 1994 (S.I. 1994/1806)
- Income-related Benefits Schemes (Miscellaneous Amendments) (No. 3) Regulations 1994 (S.I. 1994/1807)
- Criminal Justice (Scotland) Act 1987 (Crown Servants and Regulators Etc.) Regulations 1994 (S.I. 1994/1808)
- Non-Domestic Rating (Alteration of Lists and Appeals) (Amendment) Regulations 1994 (S.I. 1994/1809)
- Special Commissioners (Jurisdiction and Procedure) Regulations 1994 (S.I. 1994/1811)
- General Commissioners (Jurisdiction and Procedure) Regulations 1994 (S.I. 1994/1812)
- General and Special Commissioners (Amendment of Enactments) Regulations 1994 (S.I. 1994/1813)
- Education (National Curriculum) (Foundation Subjects at Key Stage 4) Order 1994 (S.I. 1994/1814)
- Education (National Curriculum) (Attainment Targets and Programmes of Study in Modern Foreign Languages and Technology at Key Stage 4) (Amendment) Order 1994 (S.I. 1994/1815)
- Education (National Curriculum) (Attainment Targets and Programmes of Study in History) (England) (Amendment) Order 1994 (S.I. 1994/1816)
- Education (National Curriculum) (Attainment Targets and Programmes of Study in Geography) (England) (Amendment) Order 1994 (S.I. 1994/1817)
- Education (National Curriculum) (Modern Foreign Languages) (Amendment) Order 1994 (S.I. 1994/1818)
- Insurance Premium Tax (Prescribed Rates of Interest) Order 1994 (S.I. 1994/1819)
- Air Passenger Duty (Prescribed Rates of Interest) Order 1994 (S.I. 1994/1820)
- Air Passenger Duty (Connected Flights) Order 1994 (S.I. 1994/1821)
- Civil Legal Aid (General) (Amendment) (No. 2) Regulations 1994 (S.I. 1994/1822)
- Legal Advice and Assistance (Amendment) (No. 2) Regulations 1994 (S.I. 1994/1823)
- Legal Advice and Assistance at Police Stations (Remuneration) (Amendment) Regulations 1994 (S.I. 1994/1824)
- Legal Aid in Criminal and Care Proceedings (Costs) (Amendment) (No. 2) Regulations 1994 (S.I. 1994/1825)
- St. Mary's Music School (Aided Places) Amendment Regulations 1994 (S.I. 1994/1826)
- Education (Assisted Places) (Scotland) Amendment Regulations 1994 (S.I. 1994/1827)
- Inshore Fishing (Prohibition of Fishing for Cockles) (Scotland) Order 1994 (S.I. 1994/1828)
- Lincolnshire College of Art and Design and Lincolnshire College of Agriculture and Horticulture (Dissolution) Order 1994 (S.I. 1994/1830)
- Authorities for London Post-Graduate Teaching Hospitals (Abolition) Order 1994 (S.I. 1994/1831)
- Social Security Benefit (Persons Abroad) Amendment (No. 2) Regulations 1994 (S.I. 1994/1832)
- Offshore Installations (Safety Zones) (No. 2) Order 1994 (S.I. 1994/1836)
- Social Security (Credits) Amendment Regulations 1994 (S.I. 1994/1837)
- Passenger and Goods Vehicles (Recording Equipment) Regulations 1994 (S.I. 1994/1838)
- Sunday Trading Act 1994 Appointed Day Order 1994 (S.I. 1994/1841)
- Protection of Wrecks (Designation No. 1) Order 1994 (S.I. 1994/1842)
- Building Regulations (Amendment) Regulations 1994 (S.I. 1994/1850)
- Weights and Measures (Metrication Amendments) Regulations 1994 (S.I. 1994/1851)
- Weights and Measures (Packaged Goods and Quantity Marking and Abbreviations of Units) (Amendment) Regulations 1994 (S.I. 1994/1852)
- Price Marking (Amendment) Order 1994 (S.I. 1994/1853)
- Seed Potatoes (Fees) (Scotland) Order 1994 (S.I. 1994/1859)
- Education (Annual Consideration of Ballot on Grant-Maintained Status) (Wales) Order 1994 (S.I. 1994/1861)
- Motor Vehicles (Driving Licences) (Amendment)(No. 2) Regulations 1994 (S.I. 1994/1862)
- Statutory Maternity Pay (Compensation of Employers) and Miscellaneous Amendment Regulations 1994 (S.I. 1994/1882)
- Weights and Measures (Intoxicating Liquor) (Amendment) Order 1994 (S.I. 1994/1883)
- Weights and Measures (Cosmetic Products) Order 1994 (S.I. 1994/1884)
- Local Authorities (Charges for Land Searches) Regulations 1994 (S.I. 1994/1885)
- Gas Safety (Installation and Use) Regulations 1994 (S.I. 1994/1886)
- European Communities (Designation) (No. 3) Order 1994 (S.I. 1994/1887)
- Local Authorities (Armorial Bearings) Order 1994 (S.I. 1994/1888)
- Child Abduction and Custody (Parties to Conventions) (Amendment) (No. 4) Order 1994 (S.I. 1994/1889)
- European Molecular Biology Laboratory (Immunities and Privileges) Order 1994 (S.I. 1994/1890)
- Agriculture (Miscellaneous Provisions) (Northern Ireland) Order 1994 (S.I. 1994/1891)
- Appropriation (No. 2) (Northern Ireland) Order 1994 (S.I. 1994/1892)
- Betting and Lotteries (Northern Ireland) Order 1994 (S.I. 1994/1893)
- Civil Service (Management Functions) (Northern Ireland) Order 1994 (S.I. 1994/1894)
- Immigration (European Economic Area) Order 1994 (S.I. 1994/1895)
- Litter (Northern Ireland) Order 1994 (S.I. 1994/1896)
- Rates (Amendment) (Northern Ireland) Order 1994 (S.I. 1994/1897)
- Social Security (Incapacity for Work) (Northern Ireland) Order 1994 (S.I. 1994/1898)
- Wills and Administration Proceedings (Northern Ireland) Order 1994 (S.I. 1994/1899)
- Contracts (Applicable Law) Act 1990 (Amendment) Order 1994 (S.I. 1994/1900)

== 1901–2000 ==
- Reciprocal Enforcement of Foreign Judgments (Australia) Order 1994 (S.I. 1994/1901)
- Reciprocal Enforcement of Maintenance Orders (Hague Convention Countries) (Variation) Order 1994 (S.I. 1994/1902)
- Army, Air Force and Naval Discipline Acts (Continuation) Order 1994 (S.I. 1994/1903)
- European Convention on Cinematographic Co-production (Amendment) Order 1994 (S.I. 1994/1904)
- Exempt Charities Order 1994 (S.I. 1994/1905)
- Naval, Military and Air Forces etc. (Disablement and Death) Service Pensions Amendment (No. 2) Order 1994 (S.I. 1994/1906)
- International Transport Conventions Act 1983 (Amendment) Order 1994 (S.I. 1994/1907)
- Trustee Investments (Additional Powers) Order No. 2 1994 (S.I. 1994/1908)
- Local Government Superannuation (Investments) Regulations 1994 (S.I. 1994/1909)
- Special Educational Needs Tribunal Regulations 1994 (S.I. 1994/1910)
- Road Vehicles (Registration and Licensing) (Amendment) (No. 2) Regulations 1994 (S.I. 1994/1911)
- Education (School Performance Information) (Wales) (Amendment) Regulations 1994 (S.I. 1994/1912)
- Aylesbury Vale Community Healthcare National Health Service Trust (Transfer of Trust Property) Order 1994 (S.I. 1994/1913)
- East Yorkshire Hospitals National Health Service Trust (Transfer of Trust Property) Order 1994 (S.I. 1994/1914)
- Enfield Community Care National Health Service Trust (Transfer of Trust Property) Order 1994 (S.I. 1994/1915)
- Leicester General Hospital National Health Service Trust (Transfer of Trust Property) Order 1994 (S.I. 1994/1916)
- Glenfield Hospital National Health Service Trust (Transfer of Trust Property) Order 1994 (S.I. 1994/1917)
- Leicester Royal Infirmary National Health Service Trust (Transfer of Trust Property) Order 1994 (S.I. 1994/1918)
- Milton Keynes Community Health National Health Service Trust (Transfer of Trust Property) Order 1994 (S.I. 1994/1919)
- Milton Keynes General National Health Service Trust (Transfer of Trust Property) Order 1994 (S.I. 1994/1920)
- South West Durham Mental Health National Health Service Trust (Transfer of Trust Property) Order 1994 (S.I. 1994/1921)
- Monopoly References (Alteration of Exclusions) Order 1994 (S.I. 1994/1922)
- Immigration Act 1988 (Commencement No. 3) Order 1994 (S.I. 1994/1923)
- Income-related Benefits Schemes (Miscellaneous Amendments) (No.4) Regulations 1994 (S.I. 1994/1924)
- Housing Benefit (Supply of Information) and Council Tax Benefit (General) Amendment Regulations 1994 (S.I. 1994/1925)
- Prisons and Young Offenders Institutions (Scotland) Rules 1994 (S.I. 1994/1931)
- Medicines (Advertising) Regulations 1994 (S.I. 1994/1932)
- Medicines (Monitoring of Advertising) Regulations 1994 (S.I. 1994/1933)
- Fair Trading Act (Amendment) (Merger Prenotification) Regulations 1994 (S.I. 1994/1934)
- Companies Act 1985 (Audit Exemption) Regulations 1994 (S.I. 1994/1935)
- County Court Fees (Amendment) Order 1994 (S.I. 1994/1936)
- Loch Ewe, West Ross, Scallops Fishery Order 1994 (S.I. 1994/1946)
- Registration of Births and Deaths (Amendment) Regulations 1994 (S.I. 1994/1948)
- River Clyde Catchment Area (Part) Protection Order 1994 (S.I. 1994/1949)
- Food Protection (Emergency Prohibitions) (Paralytic Shellfish Poisoning) Order 1994 (S.I. 1994/1950)
- Criminal Justice Act 1993 (Commencement No. 7) Order 1994 (S.I. 1994/1951)
- Backing of Warrants (Republic of Ireland) (Rule of Speciality) Order 1994 (S.I. 1994/1952)
- Police (Promotion) (Scotland) Amendment Regulations 1994 (S.I. 1994/1953)
- London–Holyhead Trunk Road (A5) (Bangor Bypass Section) (Eastbound On Slip Road from A4087 Caernarfon Road) Order 1994 (S.I. 1994/1972)
- Land Registration Fees Order 1994 (S.I. 1994/1974)
- Rules of the Supreme Court (Amendment) 1994 (S.I. 1994/1975)
- Scottish Development Agency Dissolution Order 1994 (S.I. 1994/1976)
- Food Protection (Emergency Prohibitions) (Paralytic Shellfish Poisoning) (No.2) Order 1994 (S.I. 1994/1977)
- Value Added Tax Tribunals Appeals (Northern Ireland) Order 1994 (S.I. 1994/1978)
- University of Abertay Dundee (Scotland) Order of Council 1994 (S.I. 1994/1980)
- Friendly Societies (Insurance Business) Regulations 1994 (S.I. 1994/1981)
- Friendly Societies (Authorisation) Regulations 1994 (S.I. 1994/1982)
- Friendly Societies (Accounts and Related Provisions) Regulations 1994 (S.I. 1994/1983)
- Friendly Societies Act 1992 (Amendment) Regulations 1994 (S.I. 1994/1984)
- Pesticides (Maximum Residue Levels in Crops, Food and Feeding Stuffs) Regulations 1994 (S.I. 1994/1985)
- Race Relations (Prescribed Public Bodies) (No. 2) Regulations 1994 (S.I. 1994/1986)
- Stonebridge Housing Action Trust (Area and Constitution) Order 1994 (S.I. 1994/1987)
- Merchant Shipping (Salvage and Pollution) Act 1994 (Commencement No. 1) Order 1994 (S.I. 1994/1988)
- Environmentally Sensitive Areas Designation (Radnor) (Welsh Language Provisions) Order 1994 (S.I. 1994/1989)
- Environmentally Sensitive Areas Designation (Ynys Môn) (Welsh Language Provisions) Order 1994 (S.I. 1994/1990)
- Remand (Temporary Provisions) (Northern Ireland) Order 1994 (S.I. 1994/1993)
- Lazy Acres Natural Gas Pipe-lines Order 1994 (S.I. 1994/1994)

== 2001–2100 ==
- Education (Initial Government of Grant-maintained Special Schools) Regulations 1994 (S.I. 1994/2003)
- Welfare Food Amendment Regulations 1994 (S.I. 1994/2004)
- Railway Pensions (Transfer and Miscellaneous Provisions) Order 1994 (S.I. 1994/2005)
- Ecclesiastical Judges and Legal Officers (Fees) Order 1994 (S.I. 1994/2009)
- Legal Officers (Annual Fees) Order 1994 (S.I. 1994/2010)
- Parochial Fees Order 1994 (S.I. 1994/2011)
- Environmental Assessment (Scotland) Amendment Regulations 1994 (S.I. 1994/2012)
- Merchant Shipping (Accident Reporting and Investigation) Regulations 1994 (S.I. 1994/2013)
- Merchant Shipping (Safety Officials and Reporting of Accidents and Dangerous Occurrences) (Amendment) Regulations 1994 (S.I. 1994/2014)
- Education (Bursaries for Teacher Training) Regulations 1994 (S.I. 1994/2016)
- Education (Norwich School of Art and Design Further Education Corporation) (Transfer to the Higher Education Sector) Order 1994 (S.I. 1994/2017)
- Education (Northern School of Contemporary Dance, Leeds Further Education Corporation) (Transfer to the Higher Education Sector) Order 1994 (S.I. 1994/2018)
- Education (Writtle Agricultural College Further Education Corporation) (Transfer to the Higher Education Sector) Order 1994 (S.I. 1994/2019)
- Building (Prescribed Fees) Regulations 1994 (S.I. 1994/2020)
- Personal Injuries (Civilians) Amendment (No. 2) Scheme 1994 (S.I. 1994/2021)
- General Medical Council (Constitution of Fitness to Practise Committees) (Amendment) Rules Order of Council 1994 (S.I. 1994/2022)
- Police Authorities (Selection Panel) Regulations 1994 (S.I. 1994/2023)
- Police (Number of Members of Police Authorities) Order 1994 (S.I. 1994/2024)
- Police and Magistrates' Courts Act 1994 (Commencement No. 1 and Transitional Provisions) Order 1994 (S.I. 1994/2025)
- Gipsy Encampments (Rushmoor and Hart) Order 1994 (S.I. 1994/2026)
- Food Protection (Emergency Prohibitions) (Paralytic Shellfish Poisoning) (No. 3) Order 1994 (S.I. 1994/2029)
- Local Authorities (Recognised Bodies for Heritable Securities Indemnities) (Scotland) Order 1994 (S.I. 1994/2030)
- Dartford — Thurrock Crossing Regulations 1994 (S.I. 1994/2031)
- Railway Heritage Scheme Order 1994 (S.I. 1994/2032)
- Dartford—Thurrock Crossing Tolls Order 1994 (S.I. 1994/2033)
- Education (Assisted Places) (Amendment) Regulations 1994 (S.I. 1994/2034)
- Education (Assisted Places) (Incidental Expenses) (Amendment) Regulations 1994 (S.I. 1994/2035)
- Education (Grants) (Music and Ballet Schools) (Amendment) Regulations 1994 (S.I. 1994/2036)
- Education Act 1993 (Commencement No. 5 and Transitional Provisions) Order 1994 (S.I. 1994/2038)
- York City Council (Foss Bank Bridge) Scheme 1993 Confirmation Instrument 1994 (S.I. 1994/2040)
- York City Council (Peasholme Green Bridge) Scheme 1993 Confirmation Instrument 1994 (S.I. 1994/2041)
- Buckinghamshire County Council (Marsh Drive Great Linford) (Canal Footbridge) Scheme 1993 Confirmation Instrument 1994 (S.I. 1994/2042)
- Supply of Machinery (Safety) (Amendment) Regulations 1994 (S.I. 1994/2063)
- Tees and Hartlepool Harbour Revision Order 1994 (S.I. 1994/2064)
- Alcan Aluminium UK Ltd. (Rateable Values) (Scotland) Order 1994 (S.I. 1994/2068)
- British Gas plc. (Rateable Values) (Scotland) Order 1994 (S.I. 1994/2069)
- Railways (Rateable Values) (Scotland) Order 1994 (S.I. 1994/2070)
- British Telecommunications plc. (Rateable Values) (Scotland) Order 1994 (S.I. 1994/2071)
- Electricity Generators (Rateable Values) (Scotland) Order 1994 (S.I. 1994/2072)
- Glasgow Underground (Rateable Values) (Scotland) Order 1994 (S.I. 1994/2073)
- Lochaber Power Company (Rateable Values) (Scotland) Order 1994 (S.I. 1994/2074)
- Mercury Communications Ltd. (Rateable Values) (Scotland) Order 1994 (S.I. 1994/2075)
- Scottish Hydro-Electric plc. (Rateable Values) (Scotland) Order 1994 (S.I. 1994/2076)
- Scottish Nuclear Limited (Rateable Values) (Scotland) Order 1994 (S.I. 1994/2077)
- Scottish Power plc. (Rateable Values) (Scotland) Order 1994 (S.I. 1994/2078)
- Water Undertakings (Rateable Values) (Scotland) Order 1994 (S.I. 1994/2079)
- Caledonian MacBrayne Limited (Rateable Values) (Scotland) Order 1994 (S.I. 1994/2080)
- Forth Ports plc (Rateable Values) (Scotland) Order 1994 (S.I. 1994/2081)
- Merchant Shipping (IBC Code) (Amendment) Regulations 1994 (S.I. 1994/2082)
- Merchant Shipping (Control of Pollution by Noxious Liquid Substances in Bulk) (Amendment) Regulations 1994 (S.I. 1994/2083)
- Merchant Shipping (BCH Code) (Amendment) Regulations 1994 (S.I. 1994/2084)
- Merchant Shipping (Prevention of Oil Pollution) (Amendment) Regulations 1994 (S.I. 1994/2085)
- County Council of Norfolk (Reconstruction of Three Holes Bridge–Temporary Bridge) Scheme 1993 Confirmation Instrument 1994 (S.I. 1994/2086)
- County Council of Norfolk (Reconstruction of Three Holes Bridge) Scheme 1993 Confirmation Instrument 1994 (S.I. 1994/2087)
- Education (No. 2) Act 1986 (Amendment) (No. 2) Order 1994 (S.I. 1994/2092)
- Education (Exclusions from Schools) (Prescribed Periods) Regulations 1994 (S.I. 1994/2093)
- Education (Grant-maintained Schools) (Initial Governing Instruments) (Amendment) Regulations 1994 (S.I. 1994/2094)
- Police (Scotland) Amendment Regulations 1994 (S.I. 1994/2095)
- Police Cadets (Scotland) Amendment Regulations 1994 (S.I. 1994/2096)
- Right to Purchase (Prescribed Persons) (Scotland) Amendment Order 1994 (S.I. 1994/2097)
- Education (National Curriculum) (Assessment Arrangements for the Core Subjects) (Key Stage 1) (Amendment) Order 1994 (S.I. 1994/2099)
- Education (National Curriculum) (Assessment Arrangements for the Core Subjects) (Key Stage 2) (England) Order 1994 (S.I. 1994/2100)

== 2101–2200 ==
- Education (National Curriculum) (Assessment Arrangements for the Core Subjects) (Key Stage 3) (England) Order 1994 (S.I. 1994/2101)
- Education (Grant) (Amendment) Regulations 1994 (S.I. 1994/2102)
- Education (Pupil Referral Units) (Application of Enactments) Regulations 1994 (S.I. 1994/2103)
- Education (Grant-maintained Special Schools) (Initial Governing Instruments) Regulations 1994 (S.I. 1994/2104)
- Local Government (Wales) Act 1994 (Commencement No. 1) Order 1994 (S.I. 1994/2109)
- County Court (Forms) (Amendment No. 2) Rules 1994 (S.I. 1994/2110)
- Education (Grant-maintained Special Schools) (Finance) Regulations 1994 (S.I. 1994/2111)
- Education (National Curriculum) (Exceptions) Regulations 1994 (S.I. 1994/2112)
- Inshore Fishing (Scotland) Act 1994 (Commencement) Order 1994 (S.I. 1994/2124)
- Welfare of Livestock Regulations 1994 (S.I. 1994/2126)
- Preserved Tuna and Bonito (Marketing Standards) Regulations 1994 (S.I. 1994/2127)
- Pupils' Registration (Amendment) Regulations 1994 (S.I. 1994/2128)
- M4 Motorway (Heathrow Airport Spur) (Speed Limit) Regulations 1994 (S.I. 1994/2129)
- Motor Vehicles (Tests) (Amendment) Regulations 1994 (S.I. 1994/2136)
- Housing Benefit and Council Tax Benefit (Miscellaneous Amendments) (No. 2) Regulations 1994 (S.I. 1994/2137)
- Council Tax Benefit (Permitted Total) Order 1994 (S.I. 1994/2138)
- Income-related Benefits Schemes (Miscellaneous Amendments) (No.5) Regulations 1994 (S.I. 1994/2139)
- M27 South Coast Motorway (Ower– Chilworth Section) Connecting Roads Scheme 1970 (Variation) Scheme 1994 (S.I. 1994/2141)
- Railways Act 1993 (Commencement No. 6) Order 1994 (S.I. 1994/2142)
- Finance Act 1994, section 7, (Appointed Day) (No. 2) Order 1994 (S.I. 1994/2143)
- Food Protection (Emergency Prohibitions) (Paralytic Shellfish Poisoning) (No.2) Order 1994 Revocation Order 1994 (S.I. 1994/2144)
- Compulsory Purchase of Land Regulations 1994 (S.I. 1994/2145)
- Railways Pensions Guarantee (Prescribed Persons) Order 1994 (S.I. 1994/2150)
- Police and Magistrates' Courts Act 1994 (Commencement No. 2) Order 1994 (S.I. 1994/2151)
- A1033 Trunk Road (Hedon Road Improvement) Order 1994 (S.I. 1994/2152)
- A1033 Trunk Road (Hedon Road) (Detrunking) Order 1994 (S.I. 1994/2153)
- Local Government Act 1988 (Defined Activities) (Exemption) (Gillingham Borough Council) Order 1994 (S.I. 1994/2154)
- Pig Carcase (Grading) Regulations 1994 (S.I. 1994/2155)
- Education (Payment for Special Educational Needs Supplies) (Amendment) Regulations 1994 (S.I. 1994/2156)
- Medicines (Veterinary Medicinal Products) (Applications for Product Licences) (Amendment) Regulations 1994 (S.I. 1994/2157)
- A47 Trunk Road (Allexton–Belton in Rutland Improvement) Order 1994 (S.I. 1994/2158)
- British Telecommunications (Dissolution) Order 1994 (S.I. 1994/2162)
- Education (Inner London Education Authority) (Property Transfer) (Amendment) (No. 2) Order 1994 (S.I. 1994/2163)
- Children (Allocation of Proceedings) (Amendment) Order 1994 (S.I. 1994/2164)
- Family Proceedings (Amendment) (No. 2) Rules 1994 (S.I. 1994/2165)
- Family Proceedings Courts (Children Act 1989) (Amendment) Rules 1994 (S.I. 1994/2166)
- Education (Publication of Notices) (Special Schools) Regulations 1994 (S.I. 1994/2167)
- Plaice and Sole (Specified Sea Areas) (Prohibition of Fishing) Order 1994 (S.I. 1994/2169)
- County Council of Northumberland (Duplicate Kitty Brewster Bridge) Scheme 1994 Confirmation Instrument 1994 (S.I. 1994/2170)
- Charities (The National Trust for Places of Historic Interest or Natural Beauty) Order 1994 (S.I. 1994/2181)
- Agricultural Holdings (Units of Production) Order 1994 (S.I. 1994/2183)
- Fire Precautions (Sub-surface Railway Stations) (Amendment) Regulations 1994 (S.I. 1994/2184)
- Coal Industry Act 1994 (Commencement No. 1) Order 1994 (S.I. 1994/2189)
- Motor Vehicles (Type Approval) (Great Britain) (Amendment) Regulations 1994 (S.I. 1994/2190)
- Motor Vehicles (Type Approval for Goods Vehicles) (Great Britain) (Amendment) Regulations 1994 (S.I. 1994/2191)
- Road Vehicles (Construction and Use) (Amendment) (No. 3) Regulations 1994 (S.I. 1994/2192)
- Food Protection (Emergency Prohibitions) (Paralytic Shellfish Poisoning) Orders 1994 Revocation Order 1994 (S.I. 1994/2193)
- Social Security (Contributions) Amendment (No. 3) Regulations 1994 (S.I. 1994/2194)
- Police (Amendment) (No. 2) Regulations 1994 (S.I. 1994/2195)
- Local Government Act 1988 (Defined Activities) (Exemption) (Tower Hamlets London Borough Council) Order 1994 (S.I. 1994/2196)

== 2201–2300 ==
- Education Act 1994 (Commencement) Order 1994 (S.I. 1994/2204)
- Wrexham and East Denbighshire Water Company (Constitution and Regulation) Order 1994 (S.I. 1994/2205)
- Education (National Curriculum) (Exceptions) (Wales) Regulations 1994 (S.I. 1994/2206)
- Fishguard—Bangor Trunk Road (A487) (Pont Seiont Improvement, Caernarfon) Order 1994 (S.I. 1994/2215)
- Free Zone (Port of Tilbury) Designation (Variation) Order 1994 (S.I. 1994/2216)
- Companies (Fees) (Amendment) Regulations 1994 (S.I. 1994/2217)
- Legal Aid in Criminal and Care Proceedings (Costs) (Amendment) (No. 3) Regulations 1994 (S.I. 1994/2218)
- Education (National Curriculum) (Assessment Arrangements for English, Welsh, Mathematics and Science) (Key Stage 1) (Wales) (Amendment) Order 1994 (S.I. 1994/2226)
- Education (National Curriculum) (Assessment Arrangements for English, Welsh, Mathematics and Science) (Key Stage 2) (Wales) Order 1994 (S.I. 1994/2227)
- Education (National Curriculum) (Assessment Arrangements for English, Welsh, Mathematics and Science) (Key Stage 3) (Wales) Order 1994 (S.I. 1994/2228)
- Railways Act 1993 (Consequential Modifications) (No. 3) Order 1994 (S.I. 1994/2229)
- Brancaster Staithe Fishery (Variation) Order 1994 (S.I. 1994/2230)
- Police (Scotland) Amendment (No.2) Regulations 1994 (S.I. 1994/2231)
- Safety of Sports Grounds (Designation) Order 1994 (S.I. 1994/2239)
- Education (Grant-maintained Special Schools) (No. 2) Regulations 1994 (S.I. 1994/2247)
- Education Act 1993 (Commencement No. 5 and Transitional Provisions) (Amendment) Order 1994 (S.I. 1994/2248)
- Marketing of Gas Oil (Sulphur Content) Regulations 1994 (S.I. 1994/2249)
- Wireless Telegraphy (Short Range Devices) (Exemption) (Amendment) Regulations 1994 (S.I. 1994/2250)
- Telecommunications (Leased Lines) (Amendment) Regulations 1994 (S.I. 1994/2251)
- Saundersfoot Harbour Revision Order 1994 (S.I. 1994/2253)
- Education (School Performance Information) (Wales) (No. 2) Regulations 1994 (S.I. 1994/2254)
- Pontefract Hospitals National Health Service Trust (Transfer of Trust Property) Order 1994 (S.I. 1994/2255)
- Wakefield and Pontefract Community Health National Health Service Trust (Transfer of Trust Property) Order 1994 (S.I. 1994/2256)
- Shropshire's Community Health Service National Health Service Trust (Transfer of Trust Property) Order 1994 (S.I. 1994/2257)
- Pinderfields Hospitals National Health Service Trust (Transfer of Trust Property) Order 1994 (S.I. 1994/2258)
- Road Vehicles Lighting (Amendment) Regulations 1994 (S.I. 1994/2280)
- Education (Government of Groups of Grant-maintained Schools) Regulations 1994 (S.I. 1994/2281)
- A23 Trunk Road (Streatham High Road, Lambeth) (Prohibition of Right Turn) Order 1994 (S.I. 1994/2282)
- Organic Products (Amendment) Regulations 1994 (S.I. 1994/2286)
- Arable Area Payments (Amendment) Regulations 1994 (S.I. 1994/2287)
- National Health Service (District Health Authorities) (No. 3) Order 1994 (S.I. 1994/2288)
- National Health Service (Determination of Districts) (No. 3) Order 1994 (S.I. 1994/2289)
- Motor Fuel (Composition and Content) Regulations 1994 (S.I. 1994/2295)
- Local Government Act 1988 (Defined Activities) (Exemptions) (England and Wales) (Amendment) Order 1994 (S.I. 1994/2296)
- Local Government Act 1988 (Competition) (Housing Management) (England) Regulations 1994 (S.I. 1994/2297)
- Ventnor Harbour Revision Order 1994 (S.I. 1994/2298)
- Social Security (Contributions) Amendment (No. 4) Regulations 1994 (S.I. 1994/2299)

== 2301–2400 ==
- Act of Sederunt (Rules of the Court of Session 1994 Amendment No.1) (Commercial Actions) 1994 (S.I. 1994/2310)
- Income Tax (Authorised Unit Trusts) (Interest Distributions) Regulations 1994 (S.I. 1994/2318)
- Social Security (Claims and Payments) Amendment Regulations 1994 (S.I. 1994/2319)
- Civil Aviation (Canadian Navigation Services) Regulations 1994 (S.I. 1994/2325)
- Personal Protective Equipment (EC Directive) (Amendment) Regulations 1994 (S.I. 1994/2326)
- European Economic Interest Grouping (Fees) (Amendment) Regulations 1994 (S.I. 1994/2327)
- General Product Safety Regulations 1994 (S.I. 1994/2328)
- Thames Estuary Cockle Fishery Order 1994 (S.I. 1994/2329)
- Education (School Information) (Wales) Regulations 1994 (S.I. 1994/2330)
- Police (Amendment) (No. 3) Regulations 1994 (S.I. 1994/2331)
- Nottingham Community Health National Health Service Trust (Transfer of Trust Property) Order 1994 (S.I. 1994/2332)
- Nottingham Healthcare National Health Service Trust (Transfer of Trust Property) Order 1994 (S.I. 1994/2333)
- Nottingham City Hospital National Health Service Trust (Transfer of Trust Property) Order 1994 (S.I. 1994/2334)
- Allington National Health Service Trust (Transfer of Trust Property) Order 1994 (S.I. 1994/2335)
- Bexley Community Health National Health Service Trust (Transfer of Trust Property) Order 1994 (S.I. 1994/2336)
- North Staffordshire Hospital Centre National Health Service Trust (Transfer of Trust Property) Order 1994 (S.I. 1994/2337)
- East Suffolk Local Health Services National Health Service Trust (Transfer of Trust Property) Order 1994 (S.I. 1994/2338)
- Ipswich Hospital National Health Service Trust (Transfer of Trust Property) Order 1994 (S.I. 1994/2339)
- Ealing Hospital National Health Service Trust (Transfer of Trust Property) Order 1994 (S.I. 1994/2340)
- Mid Anglia Community Health National Health Service Trust (Transfer of Trust Property) Order 1994 (S.I. 1994/2341)
- Nottinghamshire Ambulance Service National Health Service Trust (Transfer of Trust Property) Order 1994 (S.I. 1994/2342)
- Social Security (Industrial Injuries) (Prescribed Diseases) Amendment Regulations 1994 (S.I. 1994/2343)
- Countryside Access Regulations 1994 (S.I. 1994/2349)
- Town and Country Planning (Control of Advertisements) (Amendment) Regulations 1994 (S.I. 1994/2351)
- Public Record Office (Fees) Regulations 1994 (S.I. 1994/2353)
- Act of Sederunt (Judicial Factors Rules) (Amendment) 1994 (S.I. 1994/2354)
- Redbridge Health Care National Health Service Trust (Transfer of Trust Property) Order 1994 (S.I. 1994/2357)
- Royal Shrewsbury Hospitals National Health Service Trust (Transfer of Trust Property) Order 1994 (S.I. 1994/2358)
- Worthing Priority Care National Health Service Trust (Transfer of Trust Property) Order 1994 (S.I. 1994/2359)
- Rotherham Priority Health Services National Health Service Trust (Transfer of Trust Property) Order 1994 (S.I. 1994/2360)
- West Cumbria Health Care National Health Service Trust (Transfer of Trust Property) Order 1994 (S.I. 1994/2361)
- South Warwickshire General Hospitals National Health Service Trust (Transfer of Trust Property) Order 1994 (S.I. 1994/2362)
- Basildon and Thurrock General Hospitals National Health Service Trust (Transfer of Trust Property) Order 1994 (S.I. 1994/2363)
- Robert Jones and Agnes Hunt Orthopaedic and District Hospital National Health Service Trust (Transfer of Trust Property) Order 1994 (S.I. 1994/2364)
- Rotherham General Hospital's National Health Service Trust (Transfer of Trust Property) Order 1994 (S.I. 1994/2365)
- Calderdale Healthcare National Health Service Trust (Transfer of Trust Property) Order 1994 (S.I. 1994/2366)
- Thameside Community Health Care National Health Service Trust (Transfer of Trust Property) Order 1994 (S.I. 1994/2367)
- Cornwall Healthcare National Health Service Trust (Transfer of Trust Property) (No. 3) Order 1994 (S.I. 1994/2368)
- Queen Mary's Sidcup National Health Service Trust (Transfer of Trust Property) Order 1994 (S.I. 1994/2369)
- West Suffolk Hospitals National Health Service Trust (Transfer of Trust Property) Order 1994 (S.I. 1994/2370)
- Queen Margaret College, Edinburgh (Scotland) Order of Council 1994 (S.I. 1994/2371)
- Protection of Wrecks (MV Braer) (Revocation) Order 1994 (S.I. 1994/2372)
- National Assistance (Assessment of Resources) (Amendment No. 2) Regulations 1994 (S.I. 1994/2386)
- Education (School Information) (England) (Amendment) Regulations 1994 (S.I. 1994/2387)
- Railway Pensions (Substitution) Order 1994 (S.I. 1994/2388)
- A628/A616 Trunk Road (Flouch Junction Improvement and Detrunking) Order 1994 (S.I. 1994/2390)

== 2401–2500 ==
- National Health Service (Pharmaceutical Services and Charges for Drugs and Appliances) Amendment Regulations 1994 (S.I. 1994/2402)
- County Court (Amendment No. 3) Rules 1994 (S.I. 1994/2403)
- Potato Marketing Scheme (Amendment) Order 1994 (S.I. 1994/2404)
- A550 and A5117 Trunk Roads (Improvement between Deeside Park and Ledsham) and Connecting Roads Order 1994 (S.I. 1994/2405)
- A550 Trunk Road (Improvement between Deeside Park and Ledsham) (Detrunking) Order 1994 (S.I. 1994/2406)
- Medicinal Products: Prescription by Nurses etc. Act 1992 (Commencement No. 1) Order 1994 (S.I. 1994/2408)
- Medicines (Pharmacy and General Sale— Exemption) Amendment Order 1994 (S.I. 1994/2409)
- Medicines (Products Other Than Veterinary Drugs) (General Sale List) Amendment Order 1994 (S.I. 1994/2410)
- Medicines (Sale or Supply) (Miscellaneous Provisions) Amendment Regulations 1994 (S.I. 1994/2411)
- Bridgend and District National Health Service Trust (Transfer of Trust Property) Order 1994 (S.I. 1994/2412)
- M606 Motorway (Staygate Extension) Scheme 1994 (S.I. 1994/2413)
- A417 Trunk Road (North of Stratton to Nettleton Improvement) Order 1994 (S.I. 1994/2414)
- A417 Trunk Road (North of Stratton to Nettleton Improvement) (Detrunking) Order 1994 (S.I. 1994/2415)
- A417 Trunk Road (Daglingworth Quarry Junction) Order 1994 (S.I. 1994/2416)
- A417 Trunk Road (Daglingworth Quarry Junction) (Detrunking) Order 1994 (S.I. 1994/2417)
- A419/A417 Trunk Road (Cirencester and Stratton Bypass and Slip Roads) Order 1994 (S.I. 1994/2418)
- A419/A417 Trunk Road (Cirencester and Stratton Bypass and Slip Roads) (Detrunking) Order 1994 (S.I. 1994/2419)
- Consumer Credit (Exempt Agreements) (Amendment) Order 1994 (S.I. 1994/2420)
- Insolvent Partnerships Order 1994 (S.I. 1994/2421)
- Local Government (Publication of Manpower Information) (England) (Revocation) Regulations 1994 (S.I. 1994/2422)
- Education (Grants for Education Support and Training) (Amendment) Regulations 1994 (S.I. 1994/2446)
- Dairy Produce Quotas (Amendment) Regulations 1994 (S.I. 1994/2448)
- Building Societies (Designation of Qualifying Bodies) (Amendment) Order 1994 (S.I. 1994/2457)
- Building Societies (Aggregation) (Amendment) Rules 1994 (S.I. 1994/2458)
- Building Societies (Accounts and Related Provisions) (Amendment) Regulations 1994 (S.I. 1994/2459)
- Milk Marketing Board Scheme of Reorganisation (Third Party Rights) Regulations 1994 (S.I. 1994/2460)
- M1 Motorway (Junction 1, Barnet) (Speed Limit) Regulations 1994 (S.I. 1994/2461)
- City Council of Sheffield (Broughton Lane Bridge) Scheme 1993 Confirmation Instrument 1994 (S.I. 1994/2462)
- Teaching as a Career Unit (Transfer of Property, Rights and Liabilities) Order 1994 (S.I. 1994/2463)
- Merchant Shipping (Gas Carriers) Regulations 1994 (S.I. 1994/2464)
- Animals, Meat and Meat Products (Examination for Residues and Maximum Residue Limits) (Amendment) Regulations 1994 (S.I. 1994/2465)
- Channel Tunnel (Shop and Liquor Licensing Hours Requirements) (Disapplication) Order 1994 (S.I. 1994/2478)
- Maternity (Compulsory Leave) Regulations 1994 (S.I. 1994/2479)
- Act of Sederunt (Registration Appeal Court) 1994 (S.I. 1994/2483)
- Royal Scottish National Hospital and Community National Health Service Trust (Dissolution) Order 1994 (S.I. 1994/2484)
- Central Scotland Healthcare National Health Service Trust (Appointment of Trustees) Order 1994 (S.I. 1994/2485)
- A4 Trunk Road (Great West Road, Hounslow) (Prescribed Routes) Order 1994 (S.I. 1994/2486)
- Environmental Protection Act 1990 (Commencement No. 15) (Amendment) Order 1994 (S.I. 1994/2487)
- Roads (Traffic Calming) (Scotland) Regulations 1994 (S.I. 1994/2488)

== 2501–2600 ==
- Insolvency Regulations 1994 (S.I. 1994/2507)
- Finance Act 1989, section 165(2), (Appointed Day) Order 1994 (S.I. 1994/2508)
- Free Zone (Birmingham Airport) (Substitution of Responsible Authority) Order 1994 (S.I. 1994/2509)
- Feeding Stuffs (Amendment) (No. 2) Regulations 1994 (S.I. 1994/2510)
- A1 Trunk Road (Wetherby to Kirk Deighton New Junction and Connecting Roads) Order 1994 (S.I. 1994/2515)
- A1 Trunk Road (Wetherby to Walshford) (Detrunking) Order 1994 (S.I. 1994/2516)
- A1 Motorway (Kirk Deighton New Junction to Walshford Section and Connecting Roads) Scheme 1994 (S.I. 1994/2517)
- Export of Goods (Control) Order 1994 (Amendment No. 2) Order 1994 (S.I. 1994/2518)
- Public Trustee (Custodian Trustee) Rules 1994 (S.I. 1994/2519)
- Railways Act 1993 (Consequential Modifications) (No. 4) Order 1994 (S.I. 1994/2520)
- Aintree Hospitals National Health Service Trust (Transfer of Trust Property) Order 1994 (S.I. 1994/2521)
- Chesterfield and North Derbyshire Royal Hospital National Health Service Trust (Establishment) Amendment Order 1994 (S.I. 1994/2522)
- Salmon (Fish Passes and Screens) (Scotland) Regulations 1994 (S.I. 1994/2524)
- Broadcasting (Restrictive Trade Practices Act 1976) (Exemption for Networking Arrangements) Order 1994 (S.I. 1994/2540)
- Insolvency Fees (Amendment) Order 1994 (S.I. 1994/2541)
- Value Added Tax Act 1994 (Interest on Tax) (Prescribed Rate) Order 1994 (S.I. 1994/2542)
- Friendly Societies Act 1992 (Commencement No. 8) Order 1994 (S.I. 1994/2543)
- Bovine Offal (Prohibition) (Scotland) Amendment Regulations 1994 (S.I. 1994/2544)
- Trade Marks and Service Marks (Amendment) Rules 1994 (S.I. 1994/2549)
- Trade Marks Act 1994 (Commencement) Order 1994 (S.I. 1994/2550)
- Trade Marks and Service Marks (Forms) (Amendment) Rules 1994 (S.I. 1994/2551)
- Coal Industry Act 1994 (Commencement No. 2 and Transitional Provision) Order 1994 (S.I. 1994/2552)
- Coal Industry (Restructuring Date) Order 1994 (S.I. 1994/2553)
- Food Protection (Emergency Prohibitions) (Oil and Chemical Pollution of Fish) (No.2) Order 1993 (Partial Revocation No. 3) Order 1994 (S.I. 1994/2555)
- Social Security (Severe Disablement Allowance and Invalid Care Allowance) Amendment Regulations 1994 (S.I. 1994/2556)
- Coal Industry (Retained Copyhold Interests) Regulations 1994 (S.I. 1994/2562)
- Coal Mining Subsidence (Subsidence Adviser) Regulations 1994 (S.I. 1994/2563)
- Coal Mining Subsidence (Blight and Compensation for Inconvenience During Works) Regulations 1994 (S.I. 1994/2564)
- Coal Mining Subsidence (Provision of Information) Regulations 1994 (S.I. 1994/2565)
- Coal Mining Subsidence (Arbitration Schemes) Regulations 1994 (S.I. 1994/2566)
- Coal Industry Act 1994 (Consequential Modifications of Subordinate Legislation) Order 1994 (S.I. 1994/2567)
- Gas (Exempt Supplies) Act 1993 (Commencement) Order 1994 (S.I. 1994/2568)
- Insurance Brokers Registration Council (Code of Conduct) Approval Order 1994 (S.I. 1994/2569)
- British Coal Staff Superannuation Scheme (Modification) Regulations 1994 (S.I. 1994/2576)
- Mineworkers' Pension Scheme (Modification) Regulations 1994 (S.I. 1994/2577)
- London Docklands Development Corporation (Alteration of Boundaries) Order 1994 (S.I. 1994/2578)
- General Optical Council (Companies Committee Rules) Order of Council 1994 (S.I. 1994/2579)
- Trade Marks and Service Marks (Fees) (Amendment) Rules 1994 (S.I. 1994/2581)
- Trade Marks and Service Marks (Forms) (Revocation) Rules 1994 (S.I. 1994/2582)
- Trade Marks Rules 1994 (S.I. 1994/2583)
- Trade Marks (Fees) Rules 1994 (S.I. 1994/2584)
- Town and Country Planning (General Development Procedure) (Scotland) Amendment Order 1994 (S.I. 1994/2585)
- Town and Country Planning (General Permitted Development) (Scotland) Amendment (No. 2) Order 1994 (S.I. 1994/2586)
- National Health Service (Optical Charges and Payments) (Scotland) Amendment (No.3) Regulations 1994 (S.I. 1994/2587)
- Land Registration (Scotland) Act 1979 (Commencement No. 8) Order 1994 (S.I. 1994/2588)
- Aberdeen and District Milk Marketing Board (Residual Functions) Regulations 1994 (S.I. 1994/2589)
- North of Scotland Milk Marketing Board (Residual Functions) Regulations 1994 (S.I. 1994/2590)
- Scottish Milk Marketing Board (Residual Functions) Regulations 1994 (S.I. 1994/2591)
- Seed Potatoes (Amendment) Regulations 1994 (S.I. 1994/2592)
- Social Fund Cold Weather Payments (General) Amendment Regulations 1994 (S.I. 1994/2593)
- Police and Magistrates' Courts Act 1994 (Commencement No. 3 and Transitional Provisions) Order 1994 (S.I. 1994/2594)
- Town and Country Planning General Development (Amendment) (No. 2) Order 1994 (S.I. 1994/2595)

== 2601–2700 ==
- Inshore Fishing (Prohibition of Fishing for Cockles) (Scotland) (No.2) Order 1994 (S.I. 1994/2613)
- Firearms (Period of Certificate) Order 1994 (S.I. 1994/2614)
- Firearms (Variation of Fees) Order 1994 (S.I. 1994/2615)
- Solicitors' (Non-Contentious Business) Remuneration Order 1994 (S.I. 1994/2616)
- Value Added Tax Tribunals (Amendment) Rules 1994 (S.I. 1994/2617)
- Dumfries and Galloway College of Technology (Change of Name) (Scotland) Order 1994 (S.I. 1994/2618)
- National Health Service (Optical Charges and Payments) Amendment (No. 3) Regulations 1994 (S.I. 1994/2619)
- National Health Service (General Medical Services) Amendment (No. 2) Regulations 1994 (S.I. 1994/2620)
- Rivers Tweed and Eye Protection (Renewal) Order 1991 Variation Order 1994 (S.I. 1994/2621)
- River Lunan Catchment Area Protection (Renewal) Order 1991 Variation Order 1994 (S.I. 1994/2622)
- River Tummel Catchment Area Protection (Renewal) Order 1991 Variation Order 1994 (S.I. 1994/2623)
- National Health Service (General Medical and Pharmaceutical Services) (Scotland) Amendment (No.2) Regulations 1994 (S.I. 1994/2624)
- Trade Marks (Customs) Regulations 1994 (S.I. 1994/2625)
- Civil Courts (Amendment No. 3) Order 1994 (S.I. 1994/2626)
- Spongiform Encephalopathy (Miscellaneous Amendments) Order 1994 (S.I. 1994/2627)
- Bovine Offal (Prohibition) (Amendment) Regulations 1994 (S.I. 1994/2628)
- A12 Trunk Road (Lowestoft Eastern Relief Road) (Trunking and Detrunking) Order 1994 (S.I. 1994/2651)
- Firearms (Variation of Fees) (Scotland) Order 1994 (S.I. 1994/2652)
- Motor Vehicles (Competitions and Trials) (Scotland) Amendment Regulations 1994 (S.I. 1994/2653)
- Public Telecommunication System Designation (Comment Cablevision Wearside Partnership) Order 1994 (S.I. 1994/2654)
- Public Telecommunication System Designation (Racal Network Services Limited) Order 1994 (S.I. 1994/2655)
- Capital Gains Tax (Gilt-edged Securities) Order 1994 (S.I. 1994/2656)
- Taxes (Interest Rate) (Amendment No. 3) Regulations 1994 (S.I. 1994/2657)
- National Health Service and Community Care Act 1990 (Commencement No. 11) (Scotland) Order 1994 (S.I. 1994/2658)
- National Lottery etc. Act 1993 (Commencement No. 3) Order 1994 (S.I. 1994/2659)
- Cardiff—Glan Conwy Trunk Road (A470) (Nant Crew Improvement) Order 1994 (S.I. 1994/2660)
- Former Yugoslavia (United Nations Sanctions) Order 1994 (S.I. 1994/2673)
- Former Yugoslavia (United Nations Sanctions) (Dependent Territories) Order 1994 (S.I. 1994/2674)
- Former Yugoslavia (United Nations Sanctions) (Channel Islands) Order 1994 (S.I. 1994/2675)
- Former Yugoslavia (United Nations Sanctions) (Isle of Man) Order 1994 (S.I. 1994/2676)
- Local Government (Publication of Manpower Information) (Wales) (Revocation) Regulations 1994 (S.I. 1994/2677)
- Police (Secretary of State's Objectives) Order 1994 (S.I. 1994/2678)
- Finance Act 1994, Part I, (Appointed Day etc.) Order 1994 (S.I. 1994/2679)
- Valuation for Rating (Plant and Machinery) Regulations 1994 (S.I. 1994/2680)
- Social Security (Adjudication) Amendment (No. 2) Regulations 1994 (S.I. 1994/2686)
- Addenbrooke's National Health Service Trust (Transfer of Trust Property) Order 1994 (S.I. 1994/2687)
- Crawley Horsham National Health Service Trust (Transfer of Trust Property) Order 1994 (S.I. 1994/2688)
- East Anglian Ambulance National Health Service Trust (Transfer of Trust Property) Order 1994 (S.I. 1994/2689)
- East Birmingham Hospital National Health Service Trust (Establishment) Amendment Order 1994 (S.I. 1994/2690)
- Hinchingbrooke Health Care National Health Service Trust (Transfer of Trust Property) Order 1994 (S.I. 1994/2691)
- Kingston and District Community National Health Service Trust (Transfer of Trust Property) Order 1994 (S.I. 1994/2692)
- Lincoln District Healthcare National Health Service Trust (Transfer of Trust Property) Order 1994 (S.I. 1994/2693)
- Louth and District Healthcare National Health Service Trust (Transfer of Trust Property) Order 1994 (S.I. 1994/2694)
- Community Health Care Service (North Derbyshire) National Health Service Trust (Transfer of Trust Property) Order 1994 (S.I. 1994/2695)
- Northwick Park and St. Mark's National Health Service Trust (Transfer of Trust Property) Order 1994 (S.I. 1994/2696)
- Papworth Hospital National Health Service Trust (Transfer of Trust Property) Order 1994 (S.I. 1994/2697)
- St George's Healthcare National Health Service Trust (Transfer of Trust Property) Order 1994 (S.I. 1994/2698)
- Teachers' Superannuation (Scotland) Amendment Regulations 1994 (S.I. 1994/2699)

== 2701–2800 ==
- Harrow and Hillingdon Healthcare National Health Service Trust (Transfer of Trust Property) (No. 2) Order 1994 (S.I. 1994/2708)
- Papworth Hospital National Health Service Trust (Transfer of Trust Property) (No. 2) Order 1994 (S.I. 1994/2709)
- Habitats (Scotland) Regulations 1994 (S.I. 1994/2710)
- Export of Goods (Control) Order 1994 (Amendment No. 3) Order 1994 (S.I. 1994/2711)
- Conservation (Natural Habitats, &c.) Regulations 1994 (S.I. 1994/2716)
- Apple Orchard Grubbing Up (Amendment) Regulations 1994 (S.I. 1994/2731)
- Education (No. 2) Act 1986 (Amendment) (No. 3) Order 1994 (S.I. 1994/2732)
- Portsmouth Mile End Quay (Continental Ferry Port Phase 7) Harbour Revision Order 1994 (S.I. 1994/2733)
- Intelligence Services Act 1994 (Commencement) Order 1994 (S.I. 1994/2734)
- Road Vehicles (Registration and Licensing) (Amendment) Regulations (Northern Ireland) 1994 (S.I. 1994/2735)
- Welsh Language (Names for Police Authorities in Wales) Order 1994 (S.I. 1994/2736)
- Hill Livestock (Compensatory Allowances) Regulations 1994 (S.I. 1994/2740)
- Sheep Annual Premium (Amendment) Regulations 1994 (S.I. 1994/2741)
- Local Government Act 1988 (Defined Activities) (Exemption) (Gateshead Borough Council) Order 1994 (S.I. 1994/2744)
- Shetland Islands Council (Laxa Burn, Mid Yell) (Amendment) Water Order 1994 (S.I. 1994/2758)
- Milk Marketing Board (Residuary Functions) Regulations 1994 (S.I. 1994/2759)
- Brucellosis (England and Wales) (Amendment) Order 1994 (S.I. 1994/2762)
- Housing Renovation etc. Grants (Prescribed Forms and Particulars) (Welsh Forms and Particulars) (Amendment) Regulations 1994 (S.I. 1994/2765)
- Parental Orders (Human Fertilisation and Embryology) Regulations 1994 (S.I. 1994/2767)
- Legal Aid (Scope) Regulations 1994 (S.I. 1994/2768)
- Brucellosis (Scotland) Amendment Order 1994 (S.I. 1994/2770)
- Isles of Scilly (National Health Service) Order 1994 (S.I. 1994/2773)
- Teachers' Superannuation (Amendment) (No. 2) Regulations 1994 (S.I. 1994/2774)
- Food Safety (Live Bivalve Molluscs and Other Shellfish) (Import Conditions and Miscellaneous Amendments) Regulations 1994 (S.I. 1994/2782)
- Food Safety (Fishery Products) (Import Conditions and Miscellaneous Amendments) Regulations 1994 (S.I. 1994/2783)
- Liverpool Obstetric and Gynaecology Services National Health Service Trust (Change of Name) Order 1994 (S.I. 1994/2784)
- Road Traffic (Special Parking Areas) (London Borough of Barnet) (Amendment) Order 1994 (S.I. 1994/2785)
- Road Traffic (Special Parking Areas) (London Borough of Wandsworth) (Amendment) Order 1994 (S.I. 1994/2786)
- London North Circular Trunk Road (A406) (Barnet, Brent and Ealing) (Speed Limits) Order 1994 (S.I. 1994/2787)
- Merchant Shipping (Sterling Equivalents) (Revocation) Order 1994 (S.I. 1994/2788)
- Merchant Shipping Act 1979 (Commencement No. 14) Order 1994 (S.I. 1994/2789)
- Local Government (Wales) Act 1994 (Commencement No 2) Order 1994 (S.I. 1994/2790)
- European Communities (Designation) (No. 4) Order 1994 (S.I. 1994/2791)
- Child Abduction and Custody (Parties to Conventions) (Amendment) (No. 5) Order 1994 (S.I. 1994/2792)
- Consular Fees Order 1994 (S.I. 1994/2793)
- Extradition (Drug Trafficking) (Certain Territories) Order 1994 (S.I. 1994/2794)
- Criminal Justice (Northern Ireland) Order 1994 (S.I. 1994/2795)
- European Convention on Extradition (Bulgaria) (Amendment) Order 1994 (S.I. 1994/2796)
- Former Yugoslavia (United Nations Sanctions) (Channel Islands) (Amendment) Order 1994 (S.I. 1994/2797)
- Summer Time Order 1994 (S.I. 1994/2798)
- Child Abduction and Custody Act 1985 (Isle of Man) Order 1994 (S.I. 1994/2799)
- Family Law Act 1986 (Dependent Territories) (Amendment) Order 1994 (S.I. 1994/2800)

== 2801–2900 ==
- A19 Trunk Road (Portrack Roundabout) (Trunking) Order 1994 (S.I. 1994/2801)
- Social Security (Jersey and Guernsey) Order 1994 (S.I. 1994/2802)
- Trade Marks (Claims to Priority from Relevant Countries) Order 1994 (S.I. 1994/2803)
- Parental Orders (Human Fertilisation and Embryology) (Scotland) Regulations 1994 (S.I. 1994/2804)
- Act of Sederunt (Sheriff Court Parental Orders (Human Fertilisation and Embryology) Rules) 1994 (S.I. 1994/2805)
- Act of Sederunt (Rules of the Court of Session 1994 Amendment No.2) (Human Fertilisation and Embryology) (Parental Orders) 1994 (S.I. 1994/2806)
- Ports (Northern Ireland) Order 1994 (S.I. 1994/2809)
- Ports (Northern Ireland Consequential Provisions) Order 1994 (S.I. 1994/2810)
- Magistrates' Courts Committees (Constitution) Regulations 1994 (S.I. 1994/2811)
- Local Government (Magistrates' Courts etc.) (Amendment) Order 1994 (S.I. 1994/2812)
- Sea Fishing (Licences and Notices) Regulations 1994 (S.I. 1994/2813)
- Local Government Changes for England (Finance) Regulations 1994 (S.I. 1994/2825)
- Local Government Changes for England (Calculation of Council Tax Base) Regulations 1994 (S.I. 1994/2826)
- Urban Waste Water Treatment (England and Wales) Regulations 1994 (S.I. 1994/2841)
- Urban Waste Water Treatment (Scotland) Regulations 1994 (S.I. 1994/2842)
- Welsh Principal Councils (Day of Election) Order 1994 (S.I. 1994/2843)
- Dangerous Substances and Preparations (Safety) (Consolidation) Regulations 1994 (S.I. 1994/2844)
- Shetland Islands Council Harbour Revision Order 1994 (S.I. 1994/2846)
- Environmental Protection (Authorisation of Processes) (Determination Periods) (Amendment) Order 1994 (S.I. 1994/2847)
- Education (Special Schools Conducted by Education Associations) (Amendment) Regulations 1994 (S.I. 1994/2848)
- Education (Schools Conducted by Education Associations) (Initial Articles of Government) Regulations 1994 (S.I. 1994/2849)
- Local Government etc. (Scotland) Act 1994 (Commencement No.1) Order 1994 (S.I. 1994/2850)
- Reconstitution of the Buckingham Internal Drainage Board Order 1994 (S.I. 1994/2851)
- Medicines (Standard Provisions for Manufacturer's Licences for Veterinary Medicinal Products) Regulations 1994 (S.I. 1994/2852)
- Beef Carcase (Classification) (Amendment) Regulations 1994 (S.I. 1994/2853)
- Environmental Protection Act 1990 (Commencement No. 16) Order 1994 (S.I. 1994/2854)
- Management of Health and Safety at Work (Amendment) Regulations 1994 (S.I. 1994/2865)
- Weights and Measures Act 1985 (Metrication) (Amendment) Order 1994 (S.I. 1994/2866)
- Units of Measurement Regulations 1994 (S.I. 1994/2867)
- Weights and Measures (Metrication) (Miscellaneous Goods) (Amendment) Order 1994 (S.I. 1994/2868)
- Teachers' Superannuation (Amendment) (No. 3) Regulations 1994 (S.I. 1994/2876)
- Merger Reference (Thomas Cook Group Limited and Barclays Bank plc) Order 1994 (S.I. 1994/2877)
- Companies Act 1985 (Audit Exemption) (Amendment) Regulations 1994 (S.I. 1994/2879)
- Commonwealth Development Corporation (Additional Enterprises) Order 1994 (S.I. 1994/2880)
- Local Government Act 1988 (Competition) (Defined Activities) Order 1994 (S.I. 1994/2884)
- A13 Trunk Road (Tower Hamlets) (Bus Lanes) Traffic Order 1994 (S.I. 1994/2887)
- Local Government Act 1988 (Competition) (Defined Activities) (Construction and Property Services) Order 1994 (S.I. 1994/2888)
- Alternative Names in Welsh Order 1994 (S.I. 1994/2889)
- Family Proceedings (Amendment) (No. 3) Rules 1994 (S.I. 1994/2890)
- Occupational Pensions (Revaluation) Order 1994 (S.I. 1994/2891)
- Civil Courts (Amendment No. 4) Order 1994 (S.I. 1994/2893)
- Sheep Annual Premium and Suckler Cow Premium Quotas (Amendment) Regulations 1994 (S.I. 1994/2894)
- Housing Associations (Permissible Additional Purposes) (England and Wales) Order 1994 (S.I. 1994/2895)
- Education (Groups of Grant-maintained Schools) (Initial Governing Instruments) Regulations 1994 (S.I. 1994/2896)
- A419 Trunk Road (Latton Bypass and Slip Roads) Order 1994 (S.I. 1994/2897)
- Free Zone (Port of Sheerness) Designation Order 1994 (S.I. 1994/2898)
- Gaming Clubs (Bankers' Games) Regulations 1994 (S.I. 1994/2899)
- Milk Marketing Schemes (Certification of Revocation) (Scotland) Order 1994 (S.I. 1994/2900)

== 2901–3000 ==
- Act of Sederunt (Rules of the Court of Session 1994 Amendment No.3) (Miscellaneous) 1994 (S.I. 1994/2901)
- Alcoholic Liquor Duties (Beer-based Beverages) Order 1994 (S.I. 1994/2904)
- Value Added Tax (Increase of Registration Limits) Order 1994 (S.I. 1994/2905)
- A259 Trunk Road (A20 Castle Hill Interchange To A260 Canterbury Road Roundabout, Folkestone) Order 1994 (S.I. 1994/2912)
- A419 Trunk Road (Latton Bypass and Slip Roads) (Detrunking) Order 1994 (S.I. 1994/2913)
- Statistics of Trade (Customs and Excise) (Amendment) Regulations 1994 (S.I. 1994/2914)
- Wrexham and East Denbighshire and Chester (Pipelaying and Other Works) (Codes of Practice) Order 1994 (S.I. 1994/2915)
- Housing (Change of Landlord) (Payment of Disposal Cost by Instalments) (Amendment No. 2) Regulations 1994 (S.I. 1994/2916)
- Dairy Produce Quotas (Amendment) (No. 2) Regulations 1994 (S.I. 1994/2919)
- Importation of Animal Products and Poultry Products (Amendment) Order 1994 (S.I. 1994/2920)
- Milk Marketing Scheme (Certification of Revocation) Order 1994 (S.I. 1994/2921)
- Agricultural Marketing Act 1958 Part I (Certification of Cessation of Effect in Relation to Milk) Order 1994 (S.I. 1994/2922)
- Teachers' Superannuation (Additional Voluntary Contributions) Regulations 1994 (S.I. 1994/2924)
- Social Security (Incapacity for Work) Act 1994 (Commencement) Order 1994 (S.I. 1994/2926)
- Suspension from Work (on Maternity Grounds) Order 1994 (S.I. 1994/2930)
- Housing (Right to Buy Delay Procedure) (Prescribed Forms) (Welsh Forms) Regulations 1994 (S.I. 1994/2931)
- Housing (Right to Buy) (Prescribed Forms) (Welsh Forms) Regulations 1994 (S.I. 1994/2932)
- Criminal Justice and Public Order Act 1994 (Commencement No. 1) Order 1994 (S.I. 1994/2935)
- Medicines (Pharmacies) (Applications for Registration and Fees) Amendment Regulations 1994 (S.I. 1994/2936)
- Social Security (Claims and Payments) Amendment (No. 2) Regulations 1994 (S.I. 1994/2943)
- Social Security (Claims and Payments) Amendment (No. 3) Regulations 1994 (S.I. 1994/2944)
- Social Security (Incapacity Benefit — Increases for Dependants) Regulations 1994 (S.I. 1994/2945)
- Social Security (Incapacity Benefit) Regulations 1994 (S.I. 1994/2946)
- Social Security (Severe Disablement Allowance) Amendment Regulations 1994 (S.I. 1994/2947)
- A4 Trunk Road (Bath Road and Colnbrook By-Pass, Hillingdon) (50 mph Speed Limit) Order 1994 (S.I. 1994/2948)
- Blackpool Victoria Hospital National Health Service Trust (Transfer of Trust Property) Order 1994 (S.I. 1994/2950)
- Blackpool, Wyre and Fylde Community Health Services National Health Service Trust (Transfer of Trust Property) Order 1994 (S.I. 1994/2951)
- Parkside National Health Service Trust (Transfer of Trust Property) (No. 2) Order 1994 (S.I. 1994/2952)
- Merger Reference (Thomas Cook Group Limited and Barclays Bank plc) (No.2) Order 1994 (S.I. 1994/2953)
- Health Service Commissioner for England (National Blood Authority) Order 1994 (S.I. 1994/2954)
- Intelligence Services Act 1994 (Channel Islands) Order 1994 (S.I. 1994/2955)
- Exempt Charities (No. 2) Order 1994 (S.I. 1994/2956)
- Education (Chief Inspector of Schools in Wales) Order 1994 (S.I. 1994/2957)
- Local Government Staff Commission (Scotland) Order 1994 (S.I. 1994/2958)
- Local Authorities (Funds) (Wales) (Amendment) Regulations 1994 (S.I. 1994/2964)
- Diseases of Animals (Approved Disinfectants) (Amendment) Order 1994 (S.I. 1994/2965)
- Bingo Duty (Exemptions) Order 1994 (S.I. 1994/2967)
- Finance Act 1993, section 4, (Appointed Day) Order 1994 (S.I. 1994/2968)
- Value Added Tax (Education) (No. 2) Order 1994 (S.I. 1994/2969)
- Merchant Shipping (Salvage and Pollution) Act 1994 (Commencement No. 2) Order 1994 (S.I. 1994/2971)
- Export of Goods (Control) (Croatian and Bosnian Territories) (Revocation) Order 1994 (S.I. 1994/2972)
- Industry-Wide Coal Staff Superannuation Scheme Regulations 1994 (S.I. 1994/2973)
- Industry-Wide Mineworkers' Pension Scheme Regulations 1994 (S.I. 1994/2974)
- Social Security (Medical Evidence) Amendment Regulations 1994 (S.I. 1994/2975)
- Retention of Registration Marks (Amendment) Regulations 1994 (S.I. 1994/2976)
- Sale of Registration Marks (Amendment) Regulations 1994 (S.I. 1994/2977)
- Suppression of Terrorism Act 1978 (Designation of Countries) Order 1994 (S.I. 1994/2978)
- Margaret Danyers College (Incorporation) Order 1994 (S.I. 1994/2979)
- Forms of Entry for Parental Orders Regulations 1994 (S.I. 1994/2981)
- Medicines (Veterinary Medicinal Products) (Veterinary Surgeons from Other EEA States) Regulations 1994 (S.I. 1994/2986)
- Medicines (Restrictions on the Administration of Veterinary Medicinal Products) Regulations 1994 (S.I. 1994/2987)
- Aintree Hospitals National Health Service Trust (Transfer of Trust Property) (No. 2) Order 1994 (S.I. 1994/2988)
- Hartlepool Community Care National Health Service Trust (Transfer of Trust Property) Order 1994 (S.I. 1994/2989)
- Hartlepool and Peterlee Hospitals National Health Service Trust (Transfer of Trust Property) Order 1994 (S.I. 1994/2990)
- South Lincolnshire Community and Mental Health Services National Health Service Trust (Transfer of Trust Property) Order 1994 (S.I. 1994/2991)
- Police (Amendment) (No. 4) Regulations 1994 (S.I. 1994/2993)
- Scottish Ambulance Service National Health Service Trust (Establishment) Order 1994 (S.I. 1994/2994)
- Glasgow Dental Hospital and School National Health Service Trust (Establishment) Order 1994 (S.I. 1994/2995)
- Argyll and Bute National Health Service Trust (Establishment) Order 1994 (S.I. 1994/2996)
- Borders Community Health Services National Health Service Trust (Establishment) Order 1994 (S.I. 1994/2997)
- Borders General Hospital National Health Service Trust (Establishment) Order 1994 (S.I. 1994/2998)
- Dumfries and Galloway Community Health National Health Service Trust (Establishment) Order 1994 (S.I. 1994/2999)
- Lanarkshire Healthcare National Health Service Trust (Establishment) Order 1994 (S.I. 1994/3000)

== 3001–3100 ==
- Lomond Healthcare National Health Service Trust (Establishment) Order 1994 (S.I. 1994/3001)
- Farm and Conservation Grant (Variation) (No. 2) Scheme 1994 (S.I. 1994/3002)
- Farm and Conservation Grant (Amendment) Regulations 1994 (S.I. 1994/3003)
- A1 Trunk Road (Haringey) Red Route Traffic Order 1993 Variation Order 1994 (S.I. 1994/3004)
- A1 Trunk Road (Haringey) (Bus Lanes) Red Route Traffic Order 1993 Variation Order 1994 (S.I. 1994/3005)
- A1 Trunk Road (Islington) Red Route Traffic Order 1993 Variation Order 1994 (S.I. 1994/3006)
- A1 Trunk Road (Islington) (Bus Lanes) Red Route Traffic Order 1993 Variation Order 1994 (S.I. 1994/3007)
- Capital Gains Tax (Annual Exempt Amount) Order 1994 (S.I. 1994/3008)
- Retirement Benefits Schemes (Indexation of Earnings Cap) Order 1994 (S.I. 1994/3009)
- Income Tax (Cash Equivalents of Car Fuel Benefits) Order 1994 (S.I. 1994/3010)
- Inheritance Tax (Indexation) Order 1994 (S.I. 1994/3011)
- Income Tax (Indexation) Order 1994 (S.I. 1994/3012)
- Value Added Tax (Buildings and Land) Order 1994 (S.I. 1994/3013)
- Value Added Tax (Transport) Order 1994 (S.I. 1994/3014)
- Value Added Tax (General) (Amendment) Regulations 1994 (S.I. 1994/3015)
- Medicines (Products Other Than Veterinary Drugs) (Prescription Only) Amendment (No. 2) Order 1994 (S.I. 1994/3016)
- Medical Devices Regulations 1994 (S.I. 1994/3017)
- Accounts and Audit (Amendment) Regulations 1994 (S.I. 1994/3018)
- Electricity Supply (Amendment) (No. 2) Regulations 1994 (S.I. 1994/3021)
- Firearms (Amendment) Rules 1994 (S.I. 1994/3022)
- Charities Act 1992 (Commencement No. 2) Order 1994 (S.I. 1994/3023)
- Charitable Institutions (Fund-Raising) Regulations 1994 (S.I. 1994/3024)
- Local Government (Compensation for Redundancy) Regulations 1994 (S.I. 1994/3025)
- Local Government Superannuation (Amendment) Regulations 1994 (S.I. 1994/3026)
- Insurance Companies (Pension Business) (Transitional Provisions) (Amendment) Regulations 1994 (S.I. 1994/3036)
- Deregulation and Contracting Out Act 1994 (Commencement No. 1) Order 1994 (S.I. 1994/3037)
- National Health Service (Service Committees and Tribunal) (Scotland) Amendment Regulations 1994 (S.I. 1994/3038)
- Police (Special Constables) (Scotland) Amendment Regulations 1994 (S.I. 1994/3039)
- Rent Officers (Additional Functions) (Amendment No. 2) Order 1994 (S.I. 1994/3040)
- Excise Duty (Amendment of the Isle of Man Act 1979) Order 1994 (S.I. 1994/3041)
- Education (Fees and Awards) Regulations 1994 (S.I. 1994/3042)
- Education (Mandatory Awards) (Amendment) (No. 2) Regulations 1994 (S.I. 1994/3043)
- Education (Mandatory Awards) Regulations 1994 (S.I. 1994/3044)
- Education (Student Loans) Regulations 1994 (S.I. 1994/3045)
- Mental Health The Court of Protection Rules 1994 (S.I. 1994/3046)
- Court of Protection (Enduring Powers of Attorney) Rules 1994 (S.I. 1994/3047)
- Merchant Shipping (Liability of Shipowners and Others) (Rate of Interest) Order 1994 (S.I. 1994/3049)
- Medicines (Products Other Than Veterinary Drugs) (Prescription Only) Amendment (No. 3) Order 1994 (S.I. 1994/3050)
- Construction Products (Amendment) Regulations 1994 (S.I. 1994/3051)
- Water Byelaws (Loch an Sgoltaire) Extension S.I. 1994/3053)
- Local Government Changes for England (Non-Domestic Rating) (Contributions) Regulations 1994 (S.I. 1994/3054)
- Civil Aviation (Joint Financing) Regulations 1994 (S.I. 1994/3055)
- Cambridgeshire County Council (River Nene B1040 Dog–In–A–Doublet Bridge) Scheme 1994 Confirmation Instrument 1994 (S.I. 1994/3056)
- Income-related Benefits Schemes (Miscellaneous Amendments) (No. 6) Regulations 1994 (S.I. 1994/3061)
- Doncaster Area Drainage Act 1929 (Amendment) Order 1994 (S.I. 1994/3062)
- Coal Industry Act 1994 (Commencement No. 3) Order 1994 (S.I. 1994/3063)
- Coal Mining Subsidence (Land Drainage) Regulations 1994 (S.I. 1994/3064)
- Aire and Calder Navigation Act 1992 (Amendment) Order 1994 (S.I. 1994/3065)
- Act of Sederunt (Copyright, Designs and Patents) (Amendment) 1994 (S.I. 1994/3066)
- Environmentally Sensitive Areas (Scotland) Orders Amendment Order 1994 (S.I. 1994/3067)
- Local Government (Compensation for Redundancy) (Scotland) Regulations 1994 (S.I. 1994/3068)
- Insurance Brokers Registration Council (Registration and Enrolment) (Amendment) Rules Approval Order 1994 (S.I. 1994/3069)
- Coal Industry (Protected Persons) Pensions Regulations 1994 (S.I. 1994/3070)
- Civil Aviation (Route Charges for Navigation Services) Regulations 1994 (S.I. 1994/3071)
- Police and Magistrates' Courts Act 1994 (Commencement No. 4 and Transitional Provisions) (Scotland) Order 1994 (S.I. 1994/3075)
- Energy Information (Refrigerators and Freezers) Regulations 1994 (S.I. 1994/3076)
- Education (London Residuary Body) (Property Transfer) (Amendment) Order 1994 (S.I. 1994/3078)
- District Probate Registries (Amendment No. 2) Order 1994 (S.I. 1994/3079)
- Electromagnetic Compatibility (Amendment) Regulations 1994 (S.I. 1994/3080)
- Coal Industry Act 1994 (Consequential Modifications of Local Acts) Order 1994 (S.I. 1994/3081)
- Meat Products (Hygiene) Regulations 1994 (S.I. 1994/3082)
- Boiler (Efficiency) (Amendment) Regulations 1994 (S.I. 1994/3083)
- Local Government Act 1988 (Defined Activities) (Exemption) (Livingston Development Corporation) Order 1994 (S.I. 1994/3084)
- Set-Aside Access (Scotland) Regulations 1994 (S.I. 1994/3085)
- Act of Sederunt (Proceedings in the Sheriff Court under the Debtors (Scotland) Act 1987) (Amendment) 1994 (S.I. 1994/3086)
- Treatment of Spruce Bark (Amendment) Order 1994 (S.I. 1994/3093)
- Plant Health (Forestry) (Great Britain) (Amendment) Order 1994 (S.I. 1994/3094)
- Vehicle Licences (Duration of First Licences and Rate of Duty) (Amendment) Order 1994 (S.I. 1994/3095)
- Highlands and Islands Agricultural Programme Regulations 1994 (S.I. 1994/3096)
- Opencast Coal (Compulsory Rights, Drainage and Rights of Way) (Forms) Regulations 1994 (S.I. 1994/3097)
- Simple Pressure Vessels (Safety) (Amendment) Regulations 1994 (S.I. 1994/3098)
- Habitat (Broadleaved Woodland) (Wales) Regulations 1994 (S.I. 1994/3099)
- Habitat (Water Fringe) (Wales) Regulations 1994 (S.I. 1994/3100)

== 3101–3200 ==
- Habitat (Coastal Belt) (Wales) Regulations 1994 (S.I. 1994/3101)
- Habitat (Species-Rich Grassland) (Wales) Regulations 1994 (S.I. 1994/3102)
- Licensing (Fees) (Amendment) Order 1994 (S.I. 1994/3103)
- London Residuary Body (Pits at Stone) Order 1994 (S.I. 1994/3104)
- Education, (London Residuary Body) (Property Transfer) (Amendment) (No. 2) Order 1994 (S.I. 1994/3105)
- Education (University Commissioners) Order 1994 (S.I. 1994/3106)
- Local Government Act 1988 (Supervision of Parking) (Exemption) (Scotland) Order 1994 (S.I. 1994/3107)
- Rent Officers (Additional Functions) (Scotland) Amendment (No.2) Order 1994 (S.I. 1994/3108)
- Local Government Changes for England (Collection Fund Surpluses and Deficits) Regulations 1994 (S.I. 1994/3115)
- Marriage Act 1994 (Commencement No. 1) Order 1994 (S.I. 1994/3116)
- Motor Vehicle Tyres (Safety) Regulations 1994 (S.I. 1994/3117)
- Church Representation Rules (Amendment) Resolution 1994 (S.I. 1994/3118)
- Medical Devices (Consequential Amendments—Medicines) Regulations 1994 (S.I. 1994/3119)
- Medicines (Committee on Dental and Surgical Materials) (Revocation) Order 1994 (S.I. 1994/3120)
- Central Rating Lists Regulations 1994 (S.I. 1994/3121)
- Non-Domestic Rating (Miscellaneous Provisions) (No. 2) (Amendment) Regulations 1994 (S.I. 1994/3122)
- Non-Domestic Rating (Railways, Telecommunications and Canals) Regulations 1994 (S.I. 1994/3123)
- Local Government Reorganisation (Wales) (Transitional Provisions) Order 1994 (S.I. 1994/3124)
- Non-Domestic Rating Contributions (Wales) (Amendment) (No. 3) Regulations 1994 (S.I. 1994/3125)
- Value Added Tax (Means of Transport) Order 1994 (S.I. 1994/3128)
- Telecommunications Terminal Equipment (Amendment and Extension) Regulations 1994 (S.I. 1994/3129)
- Vocational Training for General Medical Practice (European Requirements) Regulations 1994 (S.I. 1994/3130)
- Beef Special Premium (Amendment) Regulations 1994 (S.I. 1994/3131)
- Insurance Companies (Amendment) Regulations 1994 (S.I. 1994/3132)
- Insurance Companies (Amendment No. 2) Regulations 1994 (S.I. 1994/3133)
- A69 Trunk Road (Haltwhistle Bypass) Order 1994 (S.I. 1994/3134)
- A69 Trunk Road (Haltwhistle Town) (De-Trunking) Order 1994 (S.I. 1994/3135)
- Legal Aid in Criminal and Care Proceedings (General) (Amendment) (No. 2) Regulations 1994 (S.I. 1994/3136)
- Children (Allocation of Proceedings) (Amendment) (No. 2) Order 1994 (S.I. 1994/3138)
- Non-Domestic Rating Contributions (England) (Amendment No. 3) Regulations 1994 (S.I. 1994/3139)
- Construction (Design and Management) Regulations 1994 (S.I. 1994/3140)
- Diseases of Poultry Order 1994 (S.I. 1994/3141)
- Marketing Authorisations for Veterinary Medicinal Products Regulations 1994 (S.I. 1994/3142)
- Medicines (Veterinary Drugs) (Renewal Applications for Licences and Animal Test Certificates) Regulations 1994 (S.I. 1994/3143)
- Medicines for Human Use (Marketing Authorisations Etc.) Regulations 1994 (S.I. 1994/3144)
- Non-Domestic Rating Contributions (Scotland) Amendment Regulations 1994 (S.I. 1994/3146)
- Parental Order Register (Form of Entry) (Scotland) Regulations 1994 (S.I. 1994/3147)
- Education (European Community Enlargement) (Scotland) Regulations 1994 (S.I. 1994/3148)
- Self-Governing Schools (Suspension of Proposals) (Scotland) Order 1994 (S.I. 1994/3149)
- Local Government etc. (Scotland) Act 1994 (Commencement No. 2) Order 1994 (S.I. 1994/3150)
- Registration of Births, Still-births, Deaths and Marriages (Prescription of Forms) (Scotland) Amendment Regulations 1994 (S.I. 1994/3151)
- Local Government Finance Act 1992 (Commencement No. 9 and Transitional Provision) Order 1994 (S.I. 1994/3152)
- Crown Court (Amendment) (No. 2) Rules 1994 (S.I. 1994/3153)
- Magistrates' Courts (Miscellaneous Amendments) Rules 1994 (S.I. 1994/3154)
- Family Proceedings (Amendment) (No. 4) Rules 1994 (S.I. 1994/3155)
- Family Proceedings Courts (Children Act 1989) (Amendment (No.2) Rules 1994 (S.I. 1994/3156)
- Parental Responsibility Agreement (Amendment) Regulations 1994 (S.I. 1994/3157)
- Severn Bridges Tolls Order 1994 (S.I. 1994/3158)
- Unfair Terms in Consumer Contracts Regulations 1994 (S.I. 1994/3159)
- Local Government Act 1988 (Defined Activities) (Exemption) (Hastings Borough Council, Worthing Borough Council and Barnet London Borough Council) Order 1994 (S.I. 1994/3161)
- Gloucester Harbour Revision Order 1994 (S.I. 1994/3162)
- Telecommunication Meters (Approval Fees) (BABT) (Amendment) Order 1994 (S.I. 1994/3163)
- Local Government Act 1988 (Competition) (Legal Services) (England) Regulations 1994 (S.I. 1994/3164)
- Local Government Act 1988 (Defined Activities) (Competition) (Supervision of Parking, Management of Vehicles and Security Work) (England) Regulations 1994 (S.I. 1994/3165)
- Local Government Act 1988 (Competition) (Construction and Property Services) (England) Regulations 1994 (S.I. 1994/3166)
- Local Government Changes for England (Direct Labour and Service Organisations) Regulations 1994 (S.I. 1994/3167)
- Ogwr (Ogmore Valley and Garw Valley Communities) Order 1994 (S.I. 1994/3168)
- Medicines (Veterinary Drugs) (Pharmacy and Merchants' List) (Amendment No. 2) Order 1994 (S.I. 1994/3169)
- Council Tax (Reduction of Liability) (Scotland) Regulations 1994 (S.I. 1994/3170)
- General Medical Council (Constitution of Fitness to Practise Committees) (Amendment No. 2) Rules Order of Council 1994 (S.I. 1994/3171)
- Broadcasting (Unlicensed Television Services) Exemption Order 1994 (S.I. 1994/3172)
- Bournewood Community and Mental Health National Health Service Trust (Establishment) Order 1994 (S.I. 1994/3173)
- Manchester Children's Hospitals National Health Service Trust (Establishment) Order 1994 (S.I. 1994/3174)
- Grantham and District Hospital National Health Service Trust (Establishment) Order 1994 (S.I. 1994/3175)
- Sussex Ambulance Service National Health Service Trust (Establishment) Order 1994 (S.I. 1994/3176)
- Black Country Mental Health National Health Service Trust (Establishment) Order 1994 (S.I. 1994/3177)
- Pathfinder National Health Service Trust (Establishment) Order 1994 (S.I. 1994/3178)
- Princess Alexandra Hospital National Health Service Trust (Establishment) Order 1994 (S.I. 1994/3179)
- Essex and Herts Community National Health Service Trust (Establishment) Order 1994 (S.I. 1994/3180)
- Homerton Hospital National Health Service Trust(Establishment) Order 1994 (S.I. 1994/3181)
- Birmingham Children's Hospital National Health Service Trust (Establishment) Order 1994 (S.I. 1994/3182)
- St. James's and Seacroft University Hospitals National Health Service Trust (Establishment) Order 1994 (S.I. 1994/3183)
- Royal Liverpool and Broadgreen University Hospitals National Health Service Trust (Establishment) Order 1994 (S.I. 1994/3184)
- Fosse Health, Leicestershire Community National Health Service Trust (Establishment) Order 1994 (S.I. 1994/3185)
- United Leeds Teaching Hospitals National Health Service Trust (Establishment) Order 1994 (S.I. 1994/3186)
- Air Navigation (Dangerous Goods) Regulations 1994 (S.I. 1994/3187)
- Deregulation and Contracting Out Act 1994 (Commencement No. 2) Order 1994 (S.I. 1994/3188)
- Local Government Act 1988 (Defined Activities) (Exemption) (South Norfolk District Council) Order 1994 (S.I. 1994/3189)
- Local Government Act 1988 (Defined Activities) (Exemption) (Southwark London Borough Council) Order 1994 (S.I. 1994/3190)
- Criminal Justice Act 1991 (Commencement No. 4) Order 1994 (S.I. 1994/3191)
- Criminal Justice and Public Order Act 1994 (Commencement No. 2) Order 1994 (S.I. 1994/3192)
- Criminal Justice Act 1991 (Suspension of Prisoner Custody Officer Certificate) (Amendment) Regulations 1994 (S.I. 1994/3193)
- Young Offender Institution (Amendment) Rules 1994 (S.I. 1994/3194)
- Prison (Amendment) Rules 1994 (S.I. 1994/3195)
- Social Security (Claims and Payments) Amendment (No. 4) Regulations 1994 (S.I. 1994/3196)
- Wolverhampton Health Care National Health Service Trust (Establishment) Order 1994 (S.I. 1994/3197)
- Firearms (Scotland) Amendment Rules 1994 (S.I. 1994/3198)
- Valuation for Rating (Plant and Machinery) (Scotland) Regulations 1994 (S.I. 1994/3199)
- Non-Domestic Rating (Unoccupied Property) (Scotland) Regulations 1994 (S.I. 1994/3200)

== 3201–3300 ==
- Child Abduction and Custody (Parties to Conventions) (Amendment) (No. 6) Order 1994 (S.I. 1994/3201)
- Consular Fees (Amendment) Order 1994 (S.I. 1994/3202)
- European Convention on Extradition (Amendment) Order 1994 (S.I. 1994/3203)
- Firearms (Amendment) (Northern Ireland) Order 1994 (S.I. 1994/3204)
- Food and Environment Protection Act 1985 (Isle of Man) (Revocation) Order 1994 (S.I. 1994/3205)
- Ministerial and other Salaries Order 1994 (S.I. 1994/3206)
- Double Taxation Relief (Taxes on Income) (Estonia) Order 1994 (S.I. 1994/3207)
- Double Taxation Relief (Taxes on Income) (Isle of Man) Order 1994 (S.I. 1994/3208)
- Double Taxation Relief (Taxes on Income) (Guernsey) Order 1994 (S.I. 1994/3209)
- Double Taxation Relief (Taxes on Income) (Jersey) Order 1994 (S.I. 1994/3210)
- Double Taxation Relief (Taxes on Income) (Kazakhstan) Order 1994 (S.I. 1994/3211)
- Double Taxation Relief (Taxes on Income) (Mexico) Order 1994 (S.I. 1994/3212)
- Double Taxation Relief (Taxes on Income) (Russian Federation) Order 1994 (S.I. 1994/3213)
- Double Taxation Relief (Taxes on Estates of Deceased Persons and Inheritances) (Switzerland) Order 1994 (S.I. 1994/3214)
- Double Taxation Relief (Taxes on Income) (Switzerland) Order 1994 (S.I. 1994/3215)
- Double Taxation Relief (Taxes on Income) (Vietnam) Order 1994 (S.I. 1994/3216)
- Maximum Number of Judges Order 1994 (S.I. 1994/3217)
- European Convention on Cinematographic Co-production (Amendment) (No. 2) Order 1994 (S.I. 1994/3218)
- Designs (Convention Countries) Order 1994 (S.I. 1994/3219)
- Patents (Convention Countries) Order 1994 (S.I. 1994/3220)
- Local Government Superannuation (Local Government Reorganisation in England) Regulations 1994 (S.I. 1994/3221)
- Films Co-Production Agreements (Amendment) Order 1994 (S.I. 1994/3222)
- Local Government Changes for England (Finance, Miscellaneous Provisions) Regulations 1994 (S.I. 1994/3223)
- Finance Act 1993, section 165, (Appointed Day) Order 1994 (S.I. 1994/3224)
- Finance Act 1994, Chapter II of Part IV, (Appointed Day) Order 1994 (S.I. 1994/3225)
- Exchange Gains and Losses (Transitional Provisions) Regulations 1994 (S.I. 1994/3226)
- Exchange Gains and Losses (Alternative Method of Calculation of Gain or Loss) Regulations 1994 (S.I. 1994/3227)
- Exchange Gains and Losses (Deferral of Gains and Losses) Regulations 1994 (S.I. 1994/3228)
- Exchange Gains and Losses (Excess Gains and Losses) Regulations 1994 (S.I. 1994/3229)
- Local Currency Elections Regulations 1994 (S.I. 1994/3230)
- Exchange Gains and Losses (Insurance Companies) Regulations 1994 (S.I. 1994/3231)
- Exchange Gains and Losses (Debts of Varying Amounts) Regulations 1994 (S.I. 1994/3232)
- Currency Contracts and Options (Amendment of Enactments) Order 1994 (S.I. 1994/3233)
- Environmental Protection Act 1990 (Commencement No. 15) (Amendment No. 2) Order 1994 (S.I. 1994/3234)
- Merchant Shipping (Reporting Requirements for Ships Carrying Dangerous or Polluting Goods) Regulations 1994 (S.I. 1994/3245)
- Control of Substances Hazardous to Health Regulations 1994 (S.I. 1994/3246)
- Chemicals (Hazard Information and Packaging for Supply) Regulations 1994 (S.I. 1994/3247)
- Price Indications (Resale of Tickets) Regulations 1994 (S.I. 1994/3248)
- Welfare of Animals during Transport Order 1994 (S.I. 1994/3249)
- Magistrates' Courts Fees (Amendment) Order 1994 (S.I. 1994/3250)
- Education (Inter-authority Recoupment) Regulations 1994 (S.I. 1994/3251)
- Local Authorities (Recognised Bodies for Heritable Securities Indemnities) (Scotland) Amendment Order 1994 (S.I. 1994/3253)
- National Health Service Trusts (Appointment of Trustees) (Scotland) (No.2) Order 1994 (S.I. 1994/3254)
- Local Government (Transitional Election Arrangements) (Scotland) Order 1994 (S.I. 1994/3255)
- Valuation for Rating (Decapitalisation Rate) (Scotland) Regulations 1994 (S.I. 1994/3256)
- Registration of Births, Deaths and Marriages (Fees) Order 1994 (S.I. 1994/3257)
- Criminal Justice and Public Order Act 1994 (Commencement No. 3) Order 1994 (S.I. 1994/3258)
- Electricity (Non-Fossil Fuel Sources) (England and Wales) Order 1994 (S.I. 1994/3259)
- Electrical Equipment (Safety) Regulations 1994 (S.I. 1994/3260)
- Police and Magistrates' Courts Act 1994 (Commencement No. 5 and Transitional Provisions) Order 1994 (S.I. 1994/3262)
- Highways (Inquiries Procedure) Rules 1994 (S.I. 1994/3263)
- Compulsory Purchase by Ministers (Inquiries Procedure) Rules 1994 S.I. 1994/3264)
- Court of Session etc. Fees Amendment Order 1994 (S.I. 1994/3265)
- High Court of Justiciary Fees Amendment Order 1994 (S.I. 1994/3266)
- Act of Sederunt (Fees of Sheriff Officers) (No.2) 1994 (S.I. 1994/3267)
- Act of Sederunt (Fees of Messengers-at-Arms) (No.2) 1994 (S.I. 1994/3268)
- Town and Country Planning (Fees for Applications and Deemed Applications) (Scotland) Amendment Regulations 1994 (S.I. 1994/3269)
- Road Vehicles (Construction and Use) (Amendment) (No.3) Regulations 1994 (S.I. 1994/3270)
- Public Service Vehicles (Registration of Local Services) (Amendment) Regulations 1994 (S.I. 1994/3271)
- Public Service Vehicles (Traffic Regulation Conditions) (Amendment) Regulations 1994 (S.I. 1994/3272)
- Sole and Nephrops (Prohibition of Fishing) Order 1994 (S.I. 1994/3273)
- Electricity (Non-Fossil Fuel Sources) (Scotland) Order 1994 (S.I. 1994/3275)
- Sex Discrimination Act 1975 (Application to Armed Forces etc.) Regulations 1994 (S.I. 1994/3276)
- National Savings Stock Register (Amendment) Regulations 1994 (S.I. 1994/3277)
- Overseas Life Assurance Fund (Amendment) Order 1994 (S.I. 1994/3278)
- Non-Domestic Rating (Chargeable Amounts) Regulations 1994 (S.I. 1994/3279)
- Docks and Harbours (Rateable Values) (Amendment) Order 1994 (S.I. 1994/3280)
- British Waterways Board and Telecommunications Industry (Rateable Values) Revocation Order 1994 (S.I. 1994/3281)
- Electricity Supply Industry (Rateable Values) Order 1994 (S.I. 1994/3282)
- British Gas plc (Rateable Values) Order 1994 (S.I. 1994/3283)
- Railways (Rateable Values) Order 1994 (S.I. 1994/3284)
- Water Undertakers (Rateable Values) Order 1994 (S.I. 1994/3285)
- Channel Tunnel (Sunday Trading Act 1994) (Disapplication) Order 1994 (S.I. 1994/3286)
- Planning and Compensation Act 1991 (Commencement No. 17 and Transitional Provision) (Scotland) Order 1994 (S.I. 1994/3292)
- Town and Country Planning (General Development Procedure) (Scotland) Amendment (No.2) Order 1994 (S.I. 1994/3293)
- Town and Country Planning (General Permitted Development) (Scotland) Amendment (No.3) Order 1994 (S.I. 1994/3294)
- Road Vehicles (Registration and Licensing) (Amendment) (No. 3) Regulations 1994 (S.I. 1994/3296)
- Road Vehicles (Registration and Licensing) (Amendment) (No. 2) Regulations (Northern Ireland) 1994 (S.I. 1994/3297)
- General Medical Council Preliminary Proceedings Committee and Professional Conduct Committee (Procedure) (Amendment) Rules Order of Council 1994 (S.I. 1994/3298)

== 3301–3400 ==
- Employers' Liability (Compulsory Insurance) General (Amendment) Regulations 1994 (S.I. 1994/3301)
- North West Sutherland Protection Order 1994 (S.I. 1994/3302)
- Legal Advice and Assistance at Police Stations (Remuneration) (Amendment) (No.2) Regulations 1994 (S.I. 1994/3303)
- A630 Trunk Road (Doncaster) (Detrunking) Order 1994 (S.I. 1994/3307)
- Strathclyde Regional Council (Loch Assapol) Water Order 1994 (S.I. 1994/3308)
- Strathclyde Regional Council (the Ayr Burgh Act 1885) (Amendment) Water Order 1994 (S.I. 1994/3309)
- Combined Probation Areas (Derbyshire) Order 1994 (S.I. 1994/3313)
- Combined Probation Areas (Hertfordshire) Order 1994 (S.I. 1994/3314)
- Combined Probation Areas (Suffolk) Order 1994 (S.I. 1994/3315)
- General Optical Council (Maximum Penalty) Order of Council 1994 (S.I. 1994/3327)

== See also ==
- List of statutory instruments of the United Kingdom
