= Religious coercion =

Religious coercion may refer to

- Blue laws, when enforcing religious standards
- Forced conversion
- Some aspects of state religion
