= Two Guys from Harrison-Allentown, Inc. v. McGinley =

- Supreme Court of the United States

Argued 8 December, 1960 Decided 29 May, 1961
- Full case name: Two Guys from Harrison-Allentown Incorporated, Appellant, versus Paul A. McGinley, District Attorney, County of Leigh, Pennsylvania, et al.
- Citations: 366 U.S. 582 (more)
- Argument: Oral argument

Holding
- Blue laws are constitutional.

Court membership
- Chief Justice Earl Warren Associate Justices Hugo Black · Felix Frankfurter; William O. Douglas · Tom C. Clark; John M. Harlan II · William J. Brennan Jr. Charles E. Whittaker · Potter Stewart

Case opinions
- Majority: Warren
- Dissent: Douglas

Two Guys from Harrison-Allentown, Inc. v. McGinley, 366 U.S. 582 (1961), was a United States Supreme Court case in which the Court held that blue laws, which prohibited most businesses from operating on Sundays, did not violate the Fourteenth Amendment's Equal Protection Clause nor the First Amendment's Establishment Clause. It is considered a companion case to Gallagher v. Crown Kosher Super Market of Massachusetts, Inc., McGowan v. Maryland, and Braunfeld v. Brown.

== Background ==
Two Guys was a discount department store which operated a location in Lehigh County, Pennsylvania. Paul McGinley was the District Attorney of Lehigh County.

=== Laws ===
The laws in question were a statute from 1939 and a supplementary statute from 1959. The 1939 statute prohibited "all worldly employment, business and sports" on Sundays, with some exceptions.
