= Blue laws in the United States =

Laws restricting Sunday activities

Blue laws, also known as Sunday laws, are laws that restrict or ban some or all activities on specified days (most often on Sundays in the western world), particularly to promote the observance of a day of rest. Such laws may restrict shopping or ban sale of certain items on specific days. Blue laws are enforced in parts of the United States and Canada as well as some European countries, particularly in Austria, Germany, Switzerland, and Norway, keeping most stores closed on Sundays.

The U.S. Supreme Court has held blue laws as constitutional numerous times, citing secular bases such as securing a day of rest for mail carriers, as well as protecting workers and families, in turn contributing to societal stability and guaranteeing the free exercise of religion. The origin of the blue laws also partially stems from religion, particularly the prohibition of Sabbath desecration in Christian Churches following the first-day Sabbatarian tradition. Both labor unions and trade associations have historically supported the legislation of blue laws. Most blue laws have been repealed in the United States, although many states continue to ban selling cars and impose tighter restrictions on the sale of alcoholic drinks on Sundays.

== Arizona ==
Arizona previously limited alcohol sales hours on Sundays (2 a.m. to 10 a.m.; the other six days of the week alcohol could be purchased starting at 6 a.m.). This law was repealed in 2010.

== Arkansas ==
Arkansas has 75 counties, 39 of which are "dry", meaning the sale of any alcoholic beverage is prohibited entirely. (Some exceptions are made for private facilities). Private facilities must have licenses, which can be rigorous. Sale of alcoholic beverages on Christmas Day is entirely prohibited, even in private facilities. Alcohol and liquor sales are prohibited in most counties on Sunday and statewide on Christmas Day. (Some exceptions for private facilities are made for Sundays).

== Connecticut ==
Connecticut had a ban on selling alcohol on Sundays until the law was repealed by the state legislature in 2012. Connecticut also has a ban on hunting on Sundays. Hunters are still able to hunt on private land and other permitted areas.

== District of Columbia ==
Washington, D.C. allows private retailers (Class A) to sell distilled spirits, but the District Council requires Class A retailers to be closed on Sundays (Class B retailers, such as grocery stores, may sell beer and wine on Sundays). However, in December 2012, the Council voted to repeal the Sunday restriction. The repeal took effect May 1, 2013.

== Georgia ==
Sunday retail alcohol sales in stores were prohibited by the Georgia General Assembly up until 2011. On April 28, 2011, Georgia Governor Nathan Deal signed legislation allowing local communities to vote on whether to allow alcohol sales on Sundays. Sales are still restricted on Sundays before 12:30 p.m. On November 8, 2011, voters in more than 100 Georgia cities and counties voted on a bill that would allow stores to sell alcohol on Sundays. It passed in Valdosta, Atlanta, Savannah and many other cities. Before this, cities and counties of sufficiently large populations such as most of Metro Atlanta already had Sunday alcohol sales at bars and restaurants, with local ordinances to abide by, such as having a certain amount of food sales in order to be opened and serve alcohol. Exceptions were also made by the drink at festivals and large events.

== Illinois ==
Car dealerships are required by law to be closed on Sundays. Alcohol sales are restricted in some Illinoisan communities on Sundays, typically beginning in the morning.

== Indiana ==
Carry-out alcohol sales were strictly prohibited on Sundays until 2011, when the state amended its laws to permit qualified breweries to sell local brews for carryout (generally growlers). In 2018, the law was changed to allow carry-out purchases on Sundays. Restaurants and taverns can generally still serve alcoholic beverages. Alcohol sales are no longer prohibited on New Years Day. In 2010, a change in legislation allowed Indiana residents to purchase alcohol on Election Day. A ban on Christmas sales was lifted in 2015.

== Iowa ==
Iowa Code 322.3 states that a licensed car dealership cannot either directly or through an agent, salesperson, or employee, engage in Iowa, or represent or advertise that the person is engaged or intends to engage in Iowa, in the business of buying or selling at retail new or used motor vehicles, other than mobile homes more than eight feet in width or more than 32 feet in length on Sunday.

== Maine ==
Maine was the last New England state to repeal laws that prohibited department stores from opening on Sundays. The laws against the department stores opening on Sundays were ended by referendum in 1990. Recent efforts to overturn the laws restricting automobile dealerships from opening on Sunday have died in committee in the Maine legislature. Rep. Don Pilon of Saco has led the effort to get rid of the laws that prohibit automobile dealerships from opening for business on Sundays. Hunting is prohibited on Sundays.

Maine is also one of three states where it is illegal for almost all businesses to open on Christmas, Easter, and Thanksgiving, most notably the big department and grocery stores.

State law permits alcohol sales between 5 a.m. and 1 a.m. the following day with additional time allowed for the early morning on New Year's Day. A restriction on early morning Sunday sales was repealed in 2015.

== Maryland ==
In Maryland, "a new or used car dealer may not sell, barter, deliver, give away, show, or offer for sale a motor vehicle or certificate of title for a motor vehicle on Sunday", except in Howard County, Montgomery County, and Prince George's County. Motorcycles are excepted in Anne Arundel County. In the City of Baltimore, a used car dealer may choose to operate on Sunday and not Saturday if it notifies the Motor Vehicle Administration in advance of its intention. Following a public hearing, the Commissioners of Charles County are allowed to authorize sales of motor vehicles on Sunday.

In Maryland, professional sports teams are prohibited from playing games before 1 p.m. on a Sunday unless a local law or a local ordinance allows it.

== Massachusetts ==
Most off-premises alcohol sales were not permitted on Sundays until 2004. Exceptions were made in 1990 for municipalities that were within 10 miles (16 km) of the New Hampshire or Vermont border. Since 1992, alcohol sales have been allowed statewide from the Sunday prior to Thanksgiving until New Year's Day. In both exceptions, sales were not allowed before noon. Since the law changed in 2004, off-premises sales are now allowed anywhere in the state, with local approval, after noon. Retail alcohol sales remain barred on Thanksgiving Day, Christmas Day and Memorial Day (until noon).

Massachusetts also has a "Day of Rest" statute that provides that all employees are entitled to one day off from work in seven calendar days.

Until 2019, retail employees working on Sundays were paid time-and-a-half. This was gradually phased out over 5 years until 2019, and was paralleled by a phased-in increase in the state minimum wage.

Retail sales restrictions still apply to Columbus Day, Veterans Day, Thanksgiving, and Christmas. Special rules apply to factories and mills. 55 categories of business are exempt, such as pharmacies, hotels, and restaurants.

== Michigan ==
The sale of alcohol is banned from 2 a.m. to 7 a.m. every day. The only exception to this rule is New Year's Day, in which case alcohol sales are permitted until 4 a.m. Alcohol sales were likewise banned on Sunday until 12 p.m., and on Christmas from 12 a.m. until 12 p.m., until a repeal in late 2010. Specific localities may petition for exceptions for either on-site or off-site consumption.

A law passed in 1953 prohibits the sale of motor vehicles on Sunday.

All "blue laws" which had restricted Sunday hunting, in specific Lower Peninsula counties, were repealed in 2003.

== Minnesota ==
Before the law was repealed in 2017, the sale of alcohol in liquor stores was prohibited statewide on Sundays. As recently as the 2015 legislative session, proposals to allow Sunday liquor sales were defeated regularly. However, in 2015, Sunday growler purchases were made legal. On March 2, 2017, the state legislature passed a law allowing for Sunday liquor sales to begin on July 2, 2017. Governor Mark Dayton signed the legislation as soon as it was passed. Liquor stores are not required to be open on Sundays, but those who choose to do so are restricted to the hours between 11 am and 6 pm.

Car dealerships are closed on Sundays.

== Mississippi ==
The sale of alcohol is prohibited in most of Mississippi on Sundays. Also, liquor sales are prohibited in nearly half of the state's counties.

== New Jersey ==
In 1677, the General Assembly of East New Jersey banned the "singing of vain songs or tunes" on Sabbath.

One of the last remaining Sunday closing laws in the United States that covers selling electronics, clothing, and furniture is found in Bergen County, New Jersey, although, notably, video game stores are allowed to be open on Sunday in the county. The blue laws that apply in Bergen County are state laws from which all 20 other counties in the state have opted out. The county, part of the New York metropolitan area, has one of the largest concentrations of enclosed retail shopping malls of any county in the nation; five major malls lie within the county. Paramus, where three of the county's five major malls are located, has even more restrictive blue laws than the county as a whole, banning all types of work on Sundays except work in grocery stores, gas stations, pharmacies, hotels, restaurants, and other entertainment venues. As recently as 2010, Governor Chris Christie had proposed the repeal of these laws in his State Budget, but many county officials vowed to maintain them, and shortly after, Christie predicted that the repeal would not succeed. Car dealerships are not allowed to be open or do business on Sundays anywhere in the state. In November 2012, Christie issued an executive order to temporarily suspend the blue law due to the effects of Hurricane Sandy, which cut electrical power to many local homes and other properties due to its overall strength. The Bergen County blue laws were suspended November 11, despite legal challenges by the borough of Paramus, but were back in effect November 18. The American Dream shopping mall and its tenants have been in a consistent litigation with Bergen County over their Blue Laws. They are seeking to be exempted from the Sunday closing laws because the Meadowlands Sports Complex is state owned property.

== New Mexico ==
On-premise sale of alcohol is allowed from 7 AM to 2 AM and until midnight for off-premise, including Sundays. Restaurants, but not bars, can serve alcoholic beverages on Christmas Day between noon and 10 PM. There are no package (off-premise) sales on Christmas day.

== New York ==
The ban on Sunday sales had been in existence since 1656, when implemented by Dutch colony of the New Netherlands, but was voided after 320 years as unconstitutional, in a unanimous decision by the state's highest court on June 17, 1976, because of a finding that "parts of the statue that are rarely enforced by the police and routinely disregarded by thousands of businesses" were "constitutionally defective". Prior to that time, the discount stores and supermarkets had been making sales anyway without consequence. At the time, blue laws were still in effect in 30 of the 50 states of the U.S.

Alcohol sales for consumption off-premises are not permitted between 3 a.m. and 8 a.m. on Sundays, while on-premises sales are not permitted between 4 a.m. and 8 a.m. on any day. Prior to 2006, off-premises alcohol sales were forbidden until noon on Sundays, and liquor/wine stores were required to be closed the entire day. Because grocery stores are not permitted to carry wine or liquor, the older law essentially meant that only beer and alcoholic malt beverages could be purchased at all on Sundays.

Relatively few parts of New York actually permit alcohol sales at all times permissible under state law; most counties have more restrictive blue laws of their own.

The NYS Alcoholic Beverage Control Law prohibits the issuance of a full liquor license for establishments on the same street or avenue and within two hundred feet of a building occupied exclusively as a school, church, synagogue or other place of worship. Establishments that serve alcohol onsite are exempt from restrictions prohibiting issuance of license within two hundred feet of a building occupied exclusively as a school, church, synagogue or other place of worship.

== North Carolina ==
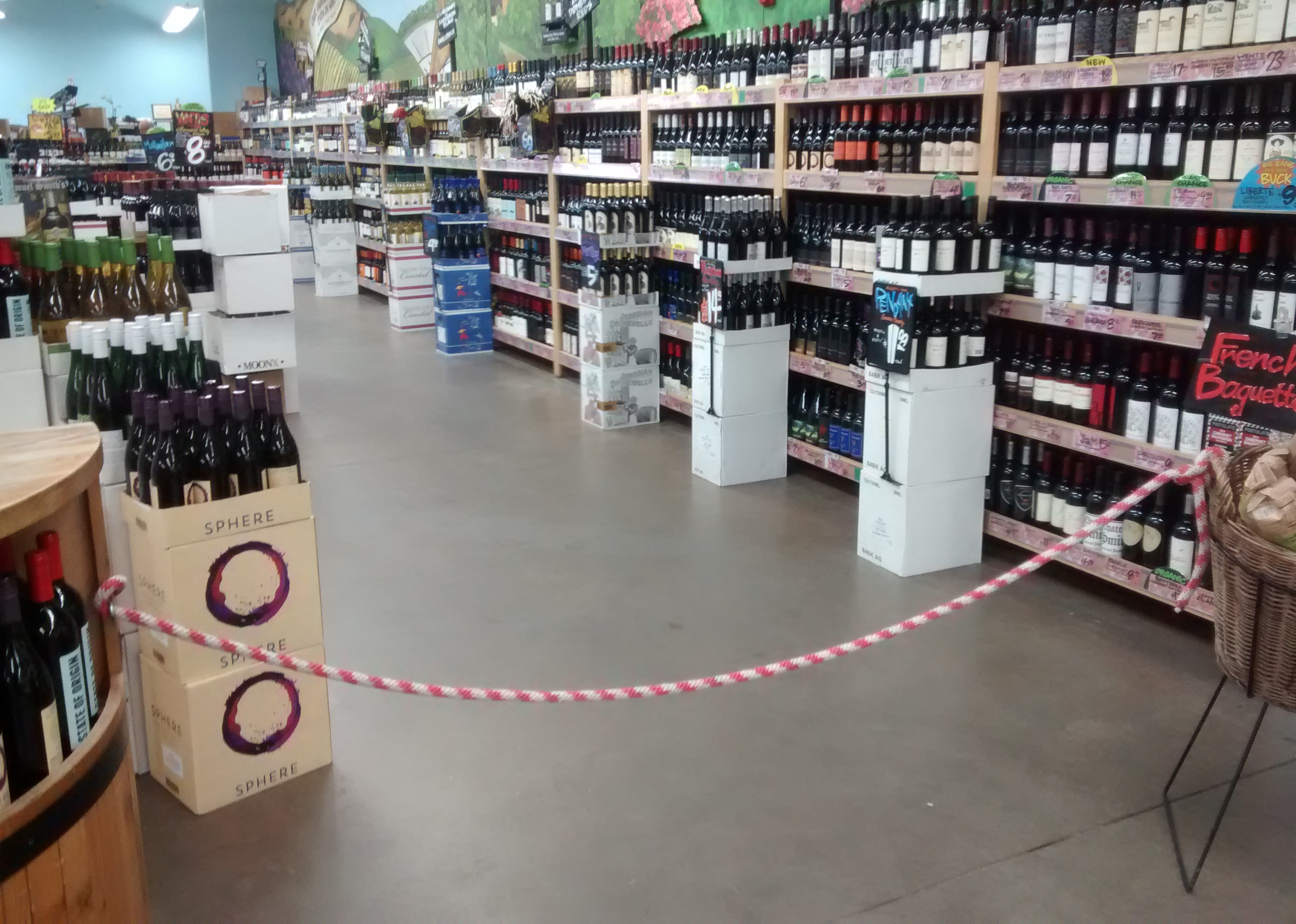
The alcohol aisle of a grocery store in Chapel Hill, North Carolina, on a Sunday morning. The aisle is roped off for compliance with the state's alcohol laws.

North Carolina does not allow alcohol sales between 2 a.m. and 7 a.m. Monday through Saturday and between 2 a.m. and either 10:00 a.m. or 12:00 p.m. on Sundays, varying by county. Gun hunting is prohibited on Sundays between 9:30 a.m. and 12:30 p.m.

== North Dakota ==
Motor vehicle sales are prohibited on Sundays. The dispensing of alcohol is banned from 2 a.m. to 11 a.m. on Sundays. Off-sale of liquor is not allowed from 2 a.m. to noon Sundays. Prior to 1967, the law was stricter in that all businesses were closed from 12 a.m. Sunday to 12 a.m. Monday. In 1967, changes more clearly defined which businesses were exempt such as pharmacies, hospitals and restaurants. The changes were made after a 1966 blizzard, after which citizens were not able to purchase some needed goods and services due to the blue law. The law changed once more in 1991 to allow businesses to open at noon on Sunday. On March 19, 2019 the state Legislature passed a law abolishing the blue law in the state. The bill was then signed by Governor Doug Burgum on March 25, 2019. The blue law expired on August 1, 2019 and the first Sunday with legal morning sales was August 4, 2019.

== Ohio ==
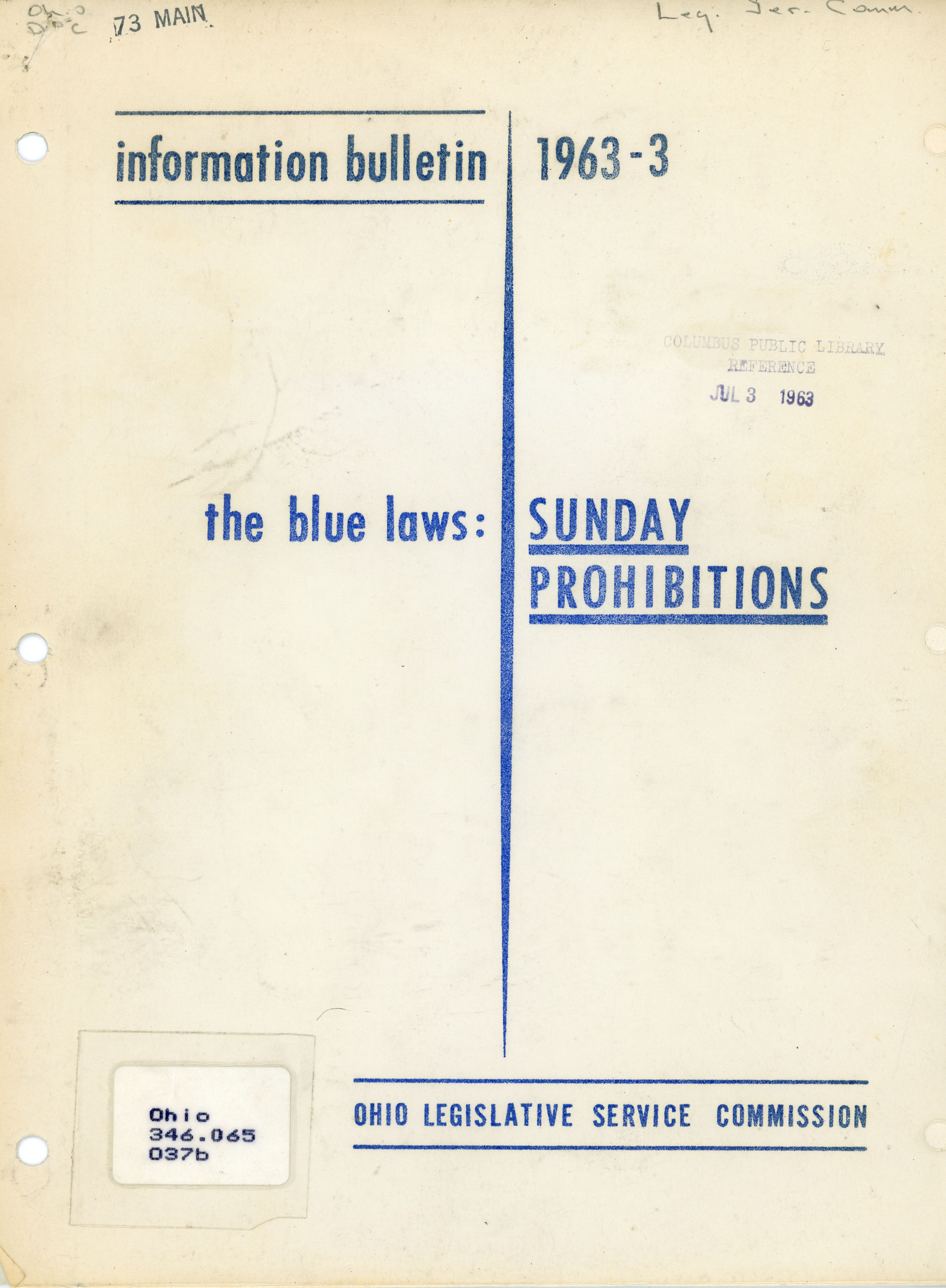
1963 Ohio legislative report on blue laws

The city of Columbus prohibited business operations on Sunday well into the 1950s.

Sunday alcohol sales are authorized by permit class and local option election. A retail business must have the proper permit and local option authorization to sell any alcohol on Sunday.

Alcohol sales on Sundays are allowed after 1:00 p.m. and in sports arenas after 11:00 a.m.

== Oklahoma ==
It is illegal to sell packaged liquor (off-premises sales) on Sundays in most counties. Sales also are prohibited Thanksgiving Day and Christmas Day.

Car dealerships are also closed on Sundays.

== Pennsylvania ==
Organized sports competition on Sundays was illegal in Pennsylvania until 1931; when challenged by the Philadelphia A's, the laws were changed permitting only baseball to be played on Sundays. In 1933, Bert Bell, understanding that prerequisites to an NFL franchise being granted to him were changes in the blue laws, played the primary role of convincing then Governor Gifford Pinchot to issue a bill before the Pennsylvanian legislature to deprecate the Blue Laws. The legislature passed the bill in April 1933, paving the way for the Philadelphia Eagles to play on Sundays. The law also directed local communities to hold referendums to determine the status and extent of Blue Laws in their respective jurisdictions. On November 7, 1933, the referendum on the Blue Laws passed in Philadelphia and it became law.

The Pennsylvania law was upheld in the 1961 landmark case Braunfeld v. Brown.

Regarding alcohol, wines and spirits are to be sold only in the state-owned Fine Wine & Good Spirits stores, where all prices must remain the same throughout the state (county sales tax may cause the price to differ slightly). As of April 2015, 157 of the 603 Fine Wine & Good Spirits stores are open from noon to 5:00 p.m. on Sundays. Beer may only be purchased from a restaurant, bar, licensed beer store, or distributor. Six and twelve packs, along with individual bottles such as 40-ounce or 24-ounce beers, may only be purchased at bars, restaurants, and licensed retailers. For larger quantities one must go to a beverage distributor which sells beer only by the case or keg, or 12-packs, which were added to beer distributors' inventories by state law in 2015. Beverage distributors (which also sell soft drinks) may sell beer and malt liquor, but not wine or hard liquor.

In 2016, a bill was passed to relax the liquor laws. Updates include allowing grocery stores, convenience stores, hotels, and restaurants to sell take out wine, allowing mail order wine shipments, and allowing 24/7 alcohol sales at casinos. Special licenses are required for businesses to take advantage of these new opportunities. Also Sunday restrictions on the hours at the state owned "Fine Wine & Good Spirits" stores were eliminated.

From the days of William Penn's founding of Pennsylvania to 2025, hunting was mostly prohibited on Sundays, with the exception of foxes, crows and coyotes. In 2020, the Pennsylvania legislature allowed the Pennsylvania Game Commission to schedule three days of Sunday hunting each year. In 2025, Governor Josh Shapiro signed bipartisan legislation ending the ban on Sunday hunting, allowing the Game Commission to implement Sunday hunting opportunities.

Car dealerships are also closed on Sunday.

== Rhode Island ==
Rhode Island does not allow stores to sell alcohol before 10 AM or after 6 PM on Sundays, although if the following Monday is a holiday, then the sale of alcohol is permitted between 10 AM and 9 PM.

== Tennessee ==
In addition to alcohol laws varying widely across Tennessee, bartenders are prohibited from allowing alcohol to be consumed on their premises between 3 AM and 10 AM on Sunday, unless the local government has decided not to allow extended hours for alcohol sales, in which case sale before noon is prohibited.

== Texas ==
=== Car sales ===
Car dealerships (both new and used) must remain closed on either Saturday or Sunday; the dealer has the option to determine on which day to close.

=== Alcoholic beverages ===
In Texas, alcoholic beverage sales are distinguished (and thus blue laws vary) in two different ways:

- The first way is by type of alcohol sold. The Texas Alcoholic Beverage Code defines "liquor" as any beverage containing more than four percent alcohol by weight, and liquor sales are more restrictive than "beer and wine" sales.
- The second way is by where the alcohol will be consumed. Separate permits are required, and differing laws apply, based on whether the alcohol is sold for "on-premises consumption" (i.e., at a bar or restaurant) or "off-premises consumption" (i.e., in a retail establishment such as a grocery store or "package store").

==== Beer and wine ====
Beer and wine can be sold for "off-premises consumption" by any retailer that can supply and has the proper licenses. A beer and wine seller may sell other non-alcohol items, and is not required to be closed for business during periods when beer and wine cannot be sold.

Beer can be sold between 7 a.m. and midnight Monday–Friday, on Saturday from 7 a.m. to 1 a.m. And Sunday between 10 a.m. (noon before August 31, 2021) and midnight. On-premises consumption permit holders may sell beer between 10 a.m. and noon but only with a food order. In certain large cities as defined within the Code, beer sales are automatically extended to 2 a.m. on any day of the week; in smaller cities and unincorporated portions of counties such sales can be allowed if authorized by the local governing body.

Wine sales are subject to the same rules as beer sales, except sales are allowed until 2 a.m. on Sunday in all cases.

==== Liquor ====
Liquor must be sold at specialized stores only (referred to as "package stores" in the statute) and the store must be physically separate from any other business (such as an adjoining convenience store). A package store may sell other items, but the store must be closed at any time when it cannot sell liquor.

Liquor may not be sold at retail stores during any of the following times:

- Any time on Sunday,
- Any time on New Year's Day, Thanksgiving or Christmas (when Christmas and New Year's Day fall on a Sunday, then sales are prohibited at any time on the following Monday) and
- between 9 p.m. and 10 a.m. local time on any other day of the week.

Wholesalers may deliver liquor to retailers at any time except on Sunday or Christmas; however, local distributors may deliver liquor to retailers only between 5 a.m. and 9 p.m. on any day except Sunday, Christmas or any day where the retailer is prohibited from selling liquor.

== Utah ==
In Utah, the city of Highland enforces a local ordinance requiring retail businesses to remain closed at least one day a week. To align with local community culture, commercial entities universally select Sunday, effectively creating a local Sunday retail ban. A ballot measure to repeal the restriction failed in 2012, with 60 percent of voters opting to keep the law in place.

== Virginia ==
Virginia historically had blue laws prohibiting all Sunday labor or business from 1610 to 1960, when the law was amended to allow household and other necessary work such as the operation of furnaces and the sale of newspapers. In 1974, the General Assembly wrote a new law which continued to prohibit Sunday labor but allowed exceptions for over 60 industries. In 1988, some store owners whose businesses were still prohibited from operating on Sunday sued the Commonwealth to try to overturn the law. In September of that year, the Supreme Court of Virginia ruled that the law was unconstitutional and therefore void, finally ending almost 400 years of blue laws.

There are forms of hunting on Sunday that were illegal, such as deer, turkey, dove and duck, and other forms that were legal. The forms of Sunday hunting that were legal were hunting on licensed hunting preserves, bear hunting, raccoon hunting and fox hunting.

A grassroots effort was attempting to bring an end to the last of the blue laws in Virginia. The grass roots effort centered around a Facebook group called "Legalize Virginia Sunday Hunting for All." During the most recent effort, the Sunday hunting bill overwhelmingly passed the Senate, only to be voted down by a 4 to 3 vote in Delegate R. Lee Ware's (Committee Chairman Republican Powhatan, Virginia) Natural Resources Subcommittee. During the debate on February 1, 2012, in the Powhatan Today opinion section, Delegate Ware expressed his concern over the dangers surrounding hunting activities in these quotes. "Bullets travel without regard to property lines—and so do shotgun pellets or slugs or even arrows from powerful-enough bows. And always, for an unsuspecting equestrian, there is the peril of encountering a hunter who misconstrues a horse—or a person—for a deer or any other game." "Equestrians, hikers, bikers, picnickers, bird-watchers, fishermen, canoeists, kayakers: all of these wish, too, to enjoy Virginia's great outdoors, often on Sunday—and they wish to do so without the threat inevitably posed by the presence of rifle- or shotgun-toting hunters."

In 2014, the General Assembly passed legislation allowing Sunday hunting on private lands. On January 16, 2020, James Edmunds, the Virginia Legislative Sportsmen's Caucus Co-Chair Delegate, introduced legislation that would repeal the ban on Sunday hunting in Virginia's public lands.

State-run Alcoholic Beverage Control (ABC) stores have limited hours of operation on Sunday.

== Washington ==
Historically, off-premises Sunday sales of spirits were banned, and all liquor stores were closed. On November 8, 1966, Washington state voters adopted Initiative 229, repealing the so-called "Blue Law," which had been enacted in 1909. Consumers still had the option of purchasing beer or wine from grocery stores or on-premises spirits from bars and restaurants. In 2005, the state began allowing off-premises spirits sales in select stores on Sundays from noon to 5 p.m.

On the election of November 8, 2011, voters passed Initiative 1183, which brought several changes to the liquor distribution and retailing system. The most significant of these changes were the end to the state monopoly on liquor sales and distribution. On June 1, 2012, Washington completed its transition to private liquor sales. Under 1183, spirits may only be sold in premises of at least 10,000 sq ft, generally including grocery stores, warehouse clubs, department stores, and some larger specialty shops.

The sale of alcohol for both on and off-premises consumption is prohibited between the hours of 2 a.m. and 6 a.m. daily.

New rule-making by the Washington State Liquor Control Board (WSLCB) based on alcohol sales hour restrictions is being proposed as the model for state licensed Marijuana sales per initiative I-502 as well.

== West Virginia ==
Hunting on Sunday is prohibited in all but 14 of 55 counties.

Alcohol sales are prohibited in West Virginia between 12:01AM and 6:00 AM, as well as on several holidays.

== Criticism by Saturday sabbath observers ==
The right to observe the Saturday Sabbath as practiced by Jews and Seventh-day Adventists gained momentum in the early 1950s.

Both civil leaders, such as Harold M. Jacobs, and rabbinical leaders, such as Solomon Sharfman, worked individually and via groups, such as The Joint Committee for a Fair Sabbath Law. They understood that their rights were to be granted "provided they did not disturb those persons who observe Sunday as a day of rest." This stance was supported by the New York Federation of Churches and the Protestant Council of New York.

The goal was to give religious freedom to "merchants who want to close their places of business on Saturday, but are afraid of business losses from a five-day-a-week schedule."

The state legislature discussed the idea of allowing a government-issued certificate to be placed in the window of a "place of business closed on Saturdays" that would be verified by "the patrolman on the beat."
