= Sabbath in Christianity =

Inclusion or adoption in Christianity of a Sabbath day

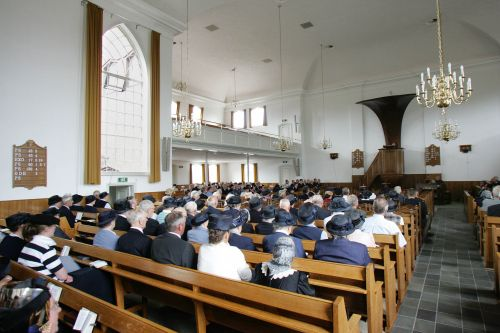
Christian denominations teaching first-day Sabbatarianism, such as the Free Presbyterian Church of Ulster, observe the Lord's Day as a day of worship and rest.

Many Christians observe a weekly day set apart for rest and worship called a Sabbath in obedience to God's commandment to remember the Sabbath day, to keep it holy.

Early Christians, at first mainly Jewish, observed the seventh-day (Saturday) Sabbath with prayer and rest. At the beginning of the second century the Church Father Ignatius of Antioch approved non-observance of the Sabbath. The now majority practice of Christians is to observe Sunday, called the Lord's Day, when many significant events occurred during the New Testament—notably the Resurrection—rather than the biblical seventh-day Sabbath as a day of rest and worship.

In line with ideas of the 16th and 17th-century Puritans (present-day Congregationalists), the Presbyterian, Baptist, as well as Methodist traditions, enshrined first-day (Sunday) Sabbatarian views in their confessions of faith, observing the Lord's Day as the Christian Sabbath. While practices differ among Christian denominations, common First-day Sabbatarian (Sunday Sabbatarian) practices include attending morning and evening church services, receiving catechesis in Sunday School (often referred to as Sabbath school), taking the day off from servile labour, not eating at restaurants, not Sunday shopping, not using public transportation, as well as not participating in sporting events that are held on Sundays; Christians who are Sunday Sabbatarians often engage in works of mercy on the Lord's Day, such as evangelism, as well as visiting prisoners at jails and the sick at hospitals and nursing homes.

Beginning about the 17th century, a few groups of Restorationist Christians, mostly Seventh-day Sabbatarians, formed communities that practiced the keeping of the Sabbath on Saturdays.

== History ==
=== Sabbath timing ===
The Hebrew Shabbat, the seventh day of the week, is "Saturday" but in the Hebrew calendar a new day begins at sunset (or, by custom, about 20 minutes earlier) and not at midnight. The Shabbat therefore coincides with what is now commonly identified as Friday sunset to Saturday night when three stars are first visible in the night sky. The Sabbath continued to be observed on the seventh day in the early Christian church. (Note: The civil calendar of the ancient Roman Empire, the Julian calendar (founded in 45 BC), marked days loosely in general practice, since the timing of midnight was difficult to determine widely at that time. Thus, the early church easily adopted for its own use the Hebrew calendar's sunset-to-sunset formula for marking the days, even after it began to calculate Easter according to the Julian calendar. Its daily cycle of church services began with Vespers, which was often celebrated just after sunset, in the early evening. This pattern made its way into both Roman and Eastern liturgical practice, and continues in use in the Eastern Orthodox Church to this day.) To this day, the liturgical day continues to be observed in line with the Hebrew reckoning in the church calendars in Eastern Orthodoxy and Oriental Orthodoxy. In the Latin Church, "the liturgical day runs from midnight to midnight. However, the celebration of Sundays and of Solemnities begins already on the evening of the previous day".

In non-liturgical matters, the canon law of the Latin Church defines a day as beginning at midnight.

=== Early Christianity ===
Jewish Christians continued to observe Shabbat but met together at the end of the day, on a Saturday evening. In the gospels, the women are described as coming to the empty tomb Greek: εις μια των σαββατων, lit. 'toward the first [day] of the Sabbath', although it is often translated "on the first day of the week". This is made clear in Acts 20:7 when Paul continued his message "until midnight" and a young man went to sleep and fell out of the window. Many Christians celebrate on Sunday because it is the day on which Jesus had risen from the dead and on which the Holy Spirit had come to the apostles. Although Christians meeting for worship on the first day of the week (Sunday for Gentiles) dates back to Acts and is historically mentioned around 115 AD, Constantine's edict was the start of many more Christians observing only Sunday and not the Sabbath. Patristic writings attest that by the second century, it had become commonplace to celebrate the Eucharist in a corporate day of worship on the first day. A Church Father, Eusebius, who became the bishop of Caesarea Maritima about AD 314, stated that for Christians, "the sabbath had been transferred to Sunday".

According to Socrates of Constantinople and Sozomen, most of the early Church (excluding Rome and Alexandria) observed the seventh day Sabbath in Easter.

=== Corporate worship ===
While the Lord's Day observance of the Eucharist was established separately from the Jewish Shabbat, the centrality of the Eucharist itself made it the commonest early observance whenever Christians gathered for worship. In many places and times as late as the 4th century, they did continue to gather weekly on the Sabbath, often in addition to the Lord's Day, celebrating the Eucharist on both days. No disapproval of Sabbath observance of the Christian festival was expressed at the early church councils that dealt with Judaizing. The Council of Laodicea (363–364), for example, mandated only that Sabbath Eucharists must be observed in the same manner as those on the first day. Neander has suggested that Sabbath Eucharists in many places were kept "as a feast in commemoration of the Creation."

The issues about Hebrew practices that continued into the 2nd century tended to relate mostly to the Sabbath. Justin Martyr, who attended worship on the first day, wrote about the cessation of Hebrew Sabbath observance and stated that the Sabbath was enjoined as a temporary sign to Israel to teach it of human sinfulness, no longer needed after Christ came without sin. He rejected the need to keep a literal seventh-day Sabbath, arguing instead that "the new law requires you to keep the sabbath constantly." However, Justin Martyr believe the Sabbath has only attributed to Moses and the Israelites. According to J.N Andrews, a historian, and theologian, he mentions, "In his (Justin) estimation, the Sabbath was a Jewish institution, absolutely unknown to good men before the time of Moses, and of no authority whatever since the death of Christ." He identifies this through Justin's writings: "Do you see that the elements are not idle, and keep no Sabbaths? Remain as you were born. For if there was no need of circumcision before Abraham, or of the observance of Sabbaths, of feasts and sacrifices, before Moses; no more need of them is there now, after that, according to the will of God, Jesus Christ the Son of God has been born without sin, of a virgin sprung from the stock of Abraham." With more clarification, Andrews also states: "Not only does he (Justin) declare that the Jews were commanded to keep the sabbath because of their wickedness, but in chapter nineteen he denies that any Sabbath existed before Moses. Thus, after naming Adam, Abel, Enoch, Lot, and Melchizedek, he says: "Moreover, all those righteous men already mentioned, though they kept no Sabbaths were pleasing to God." But though he thus denies the Sabbatic institution before the time of Moses he presently makes this statement concerning the Jews: "And you were commanded to keep Sabbaths, that you might retain the memorial of God. For his word makes this announcement, saying. 'That ye may know that I am God who redeemed you.'"[Eze.20:12.]. On these statements from Justin Martyr, J.N Andrews concludes "The Sabbath is indeed the memorial of the God that made the heavens and the earth. And what an absurdity to deny that that memorial was set up when the creative work was done, and to affirm that twenty-five hundred years intervened between the work and the memorial!"

=== Day of rest ===
A common theme in criticism of Hebrew Shabbat rest was idleness, found not to be in the Christian spirit of rest. Irenaeus (late 2nd century), also citing continuous Sabbath observance, wrote that the Christian "will not be commanded to leave idle one day of rest, who is constantly keeping sabbath", and Tertullian (early 3rd century) argued "that we still more ought to observe a sabbath from all servile work always, and not only every seventh-day, but through all time". This early metaphorical interpretation of Sabbath applied it to the entire Christian life.

Ignatius, cautioning against "Judaizing" in the Epistle of Ignatius to the Magnesians, contrasts the Jewish Shabbat practices with the Christian life which includes the Lord's Day:

Let us therefore no longer keep the Sabbath after the Jewish manner, and rejoice in days of idleness. [...] But let every one of you keep the Sabbath after a spiritual manner, rejoicing in meditation on the law, not in relaxation of the body, admiring the workmanship of God, and not eating things prepared the day before, nor using lukewarm drinks, and walking within a prescribed space, nor finding delight in dancing and plaudits which have no sense in them. And after the observance of the Sabbath, let every friend of Christ keep the Lord's [Day, Dominicam] as a festival, the resurrection-day, the queen and chief of all the days.

The 2nd and 3rd centuries solidified the early church's emphasis upon Sunday worship and its rejection of a Jewish (Mosaic Law-based) observation of the Sabbath and manner of rest. Christian practice of following Sabbath after the manner of the Hebrews declined, prompting Tertullian to note "to [us] Sabbaths are strange" and unobserved. Even as late as the 4th century, Judaizing was still sometimes a problem within the Church, but by this time it was repudiated strongly as heresy.

Sunday was another work day in the Roman Empire. On March 7, 321, however, Roman Emperor Constantine I issued a civil decree making Sunday a day of rest from labor, stating:

All judges and city people and the craftsmen shall rest upon the venerable day of the sun. Country people, however, may freely attend to the cultivation of the fields, because it frequently happens that no other days are better adapted for planting the grain in the furrows or the vines in trenches. So that the advantage given by heavenly providence may not for the occasion of a short time perish.

While established only in civil law rather than religious principle, the Church welcomed the development as a means by which Christians could the more easily attend Sunday worship and observe Christian rest. At Laodicea also, the Church encouraged Christians to make use of the day for Christian rest where possible, without ascribing to it any of the regulation of Mosaic Law, and indeed anathematizing Hebrew observance on the Sabbath. The civil law and its effects made possible a pattern in Church life that has been imitated throughout the centuries in many places and cultures, wherever possible.

=== From ancient times to Middle Ages ===
Augustine of Hippo followed the early patristic writers in spiritualizing the meaning of the Sabbath commandment, referring it to eschatological rest rather than observance of a literal day. Such writing, however, did serve to deepen the idea of Christian rest on Sunday, and its practice increased in prominence throughout the early Middle Ages.

Thomas Aquinas taught that the Decalogue is an expression of natural law which binds all men, and therefore the Sabbath commandment is a moral requirement along with the other nine. Thus in the West, Sunday rest became more closely associated with a Christian application of the Sabbath, a development towards the idea of a "Christian Sabbath" rather than a Hebrew one. Sunday worship and Sunday rest combined powerfully to relate to Sabbath commandment precepts.

==== Continuations of Hebrew practices ====
Seventh-day Sabbath was observed at least sporadically by a minority of groups during the Middle Ages.

In the early church in Ireland, there is evidence that a sabbath-rest on Saturday may have been kept along with Mass on Sunday as the Lord's Day. It appears that many of the canon laws in Ireland from that period were derived from parts of the laws of Moses. In Adomnan of Iona's biography of St Columba it describes Columba's death by having Columba say on a Saturday, "Today is truly my sabbath, for it is my last day in this wearisome life, when I shall keep the Sabbath after my troublesome labours. At midnight this Sunday, as Scripture saith, 'I shall go the way of my fathers'" and he then dies that night. The identification of this Sabbath day as a Saturday in the narrative is clear in the context, because Columba is recorded as seeing an angel at the Mass on the previous Sunday and the narrative claims he dies in the same week, on the Sabbath day at the end of the week, during the 'Lord's night' (referring to Saturday night-Sunday morning).

An Eastern body of Christian Sabbath-keepers mentioned from the 8th century to the 12th is called Athenians ("touch-not") because they abstained from uncleanness and intoxicating drinks, called Athinginians in Neander: "This sect, which had its principal seat in the city of Armorion, in upper Phrygia, where many Jews resided, sprung out of a mixture of Judaism and Christianity. They united baptism with the observance of all the rites of Judaism, circumcision excepted. We may perhaps recognize a branch of the older Judaizing sects."

Cardinal Hergenrother says that they stood in intimate relation with Emperor Michael II (AD 821–829), and testifies that they observed Sabbath. As late as the 11th century Cardinal Humbert still referred to the Nazarenes as a Sabbath-keeping Christian body existing at that time. But in the 10th and 11th centuries, there was a great extension of sects from the East to the West. Neander states that the corruption of the clergy furnished a most important vantage-ground on which to attack the dominant church. The abstemious life of these Christians, the simplicity and earnestness of their preaching and teaching, had their effect. "Thus we find them emerging at once in the 11th century, in countries the most diverse, and the most remote from each other, in Italy, France, and even in the Harz districts in Germany." Likewise, also, "traces of Sabbath-keepers are found in the times of Gregory I, Gregory VII, and in the 12th century in Lombardy."

=== Oriental Orthodoxy ===
The Sabbath is considered holy in the Oriental Orthodox churches, both Sunday (the "Christian Sabbath") and Saturday (the "Old Sabbath"). The Orthodox Tewahedo churches are known for celebrating the Sabbath, a practice defended in the Oriental Orthodox church in Ethiopia in the 1300s by Ewostatewos (ዮስጣቴዎስ, Ancient Greek: Ευστάθιος, romanized: Eustathios) but deriving from the Apostolic Constitutions and the Canons of the Apostles, an early Christian text invoking the authority of the Apostles and practiced in the Coptic Orthodox Church much earlier. In response to colonial pressure by missionaries of the Catholic Church in the 1500s, the emperor Saint Gelawdewos wrote his Confession, an apologia of traditional beliefs and practices including observation of the Sabbath and a theological defense of the Miaphysitism of Oriental Orthodoxy. In it, he cites the Didascalia and distances the Christian observance of the seventh-day Sabbath from the Jewish observance, explicitly stating "we do not honour it as the Jews do... but we so honour it that we celebrate thereon the Eucharist and have love-feasts, even as our Fathers the Apostles have taught us in the Didascalia".

=== Protestant Reformation ===
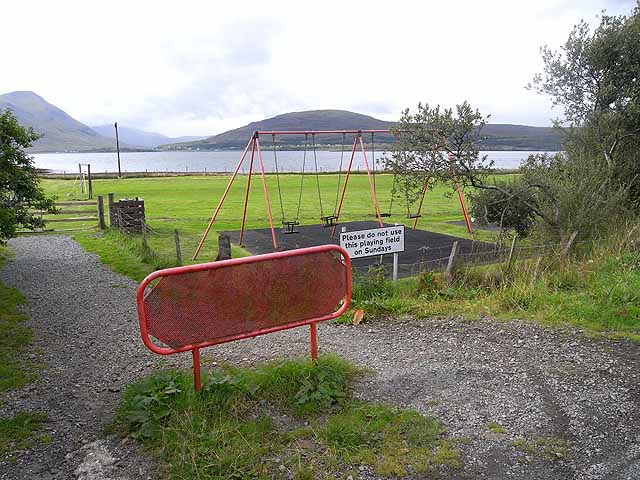
A recreation ground on Raasay displaying a sign "Please do not use this playing field on Sundays"

Protestant reformers, beginning in the 16th century, brought new interpretations of Christian law to the West. The Heidelberg Catechism of the Reformed Churches founded by John Calvin teaches that the moral law as contained in the Ten Commandments is binding for Christians and that it instructs Christians how to live in service to God in gratitude for His grace shown in redeeming mankind. Likewise, Martin Luther, in his work against the Antinomians, rejected the idea of the abolition of the Ten Commandments. They also viewed Sunday rest as a civic institution established by human authority, which provided an occasion for bodily rest and public worship. Another Protestant, John Wesley, stated "This 'handwriting of ordinances' our Lord did blot out, take away, and nail to His cross. But the moral law contained in the Ten Commandments, and enforced by the prophets, He did not take away. ... The moral law stands on an entirely different foundation from the ceremonial or ritual law. ... Every part of this law must remain in force upon all mankind and in all ages."

Sabbatarianism arose and spread among both the continental and English Protestants during the 17th and 18th centuries. The Puritans of England and Scotland brought a new rigorism into the observance of the Christian Lord's Day in reaction to the customary Sunday observance of the time, which they regarded as lax. They appealed to Sabbath ordinances with the idea that only the Bible can bind men's consciences on whether or how they will take a break from work, or to impose an obligation to meet at a particular time. Their influential reasoning spread to other denominations also, and it is primarily through their influence that "Sabbath" has become the colloquial equivalent of "Lord's Day" or "Sunday". Sunday Sabbatarianism is enshrined in its most mature expression, the Westminster Confession of Faith (1646), in the Calvinist theological tradition. Paragraphs 7 and 8 of Chapter 21 (Of Religious Worship, and the Sabbath Day) read:

7. As it is the law of nature, that, in general, a due proportion of time be set apart for the worship of God; so, in his Word, by a positive, moral, and perpetual commandment binding all men in all ages, he hath particularly appointed one day in seven, for a Sabbath, to be kept holy unto him: which, from the beginning of the world to the resurrection of Christ, was the last day of the week; and, from the resurrection of Christ, was changed into the first day of the week, which, in Scripture, is called the Lord's day, and is to be continued to the end of the world, as the Christian Sabbath.
8. This Sabbath is then kept holy unto the Lord, when men, after a due preparing of their hearts, and ordering of their common affairs beforehand, do not only observe a holy rest, all the day, from their own works, words, and thoughts about their worldly employments and recreations, but also are taken up, the whole time, in the public and private exercises of his worship, and in the duties of necessity and mercy.

The confession holds that not only is work forbidden on Sunday, but also "works, words, and thoughts" about "worldly employments and recreations". Instead, the whole day should be taken up with "public and private exercises of [one's] worship, and in the duties of necessity and mercy".

Strict Sunday Sabbatarianism is sometimes called "Puritan Sabbath", which may be contrasted with "Continental Sabbath". The latter follows the reformed confessions of faith of Continental Europe such as the Heidelberg Catechism, which emphasize rest and worship on the Lord's Day, but do not explicitly forbid recreational activities. However, in practice, many continental Reformed Christians also abstain from recreation on the Sabbath, following the admonition by the Heidelberg Catechism's author Zacharaias Ursinus that "To keep holy the Sabbath, is not to spend the day in slothfulness and idleness".

Though first-day Sabbatarian practice declined in the 18th century, the First Great Awakening in the 19th century led to a greater concern for strict Sunday observance. The founding of the Day One Christian Ministries in 1831 was influenced by the teaching of Daniel Wilson.

== Common theology ==
Many Christian theologians believe that Sabbath observance is not binding for Christians today, citing for instance Colossians 2:16–17.

Some Christian non-Sabbatarians advocate physical Sabbath rest on any chosen day of the week, and some advocate Sabbath as a symbolic metaphor for rest in Christ; the concept of Lord's Day is usually treated as synonymous with "Sabbath". This non-Sabbatarian interpretation usually states that Jesus's obedience and the New Covenant fulfilled the laws of Sabbath, the Ten Commandments, and the Law of Moses, which are thus considered not to be binding moral laws, and sometimes considered abolished or abrogated. While Sunday is often observed as the day of Christian assembly and worship, in accordance with church tradition, Sabbath commandments are dissociated from this practice.

Non-Sabbatarian Christians also cite 2 Corinthians 3:2–3, in which believers are compared to "a letter from Christ, the result of our ministry, written ... not on tablets of stone but on tablets of human hearts"; this interpretation states that Christians accordingly no longer follow the Ten Commandments with dead orthodoxy ("tablets of stone"), but follow a new law written upon "tablets of human hearts". In 3:7–11 we read that "if the ministry that brought death, which was engraved in letters on stone, came with glory ..., will not the ministry of the Spirit be even more glorious? ... And if what was fading away came with glory, how much greater is the glory of that which lasts!" This is interpreted as teaching that New Covenant Christians are not bound by the Mosaic Law, and that Sabbath-keeping is not required. Further, because "love is the fulfillment of the law", the new-covenant "law" is considered to be based entirely upon love and to rescind Sabbath requirements.

Methodist theologian Joseph D. McPherson criticizes these views, and teaches that the Lord's Day as the First-day Christian Sabbath is binding:

It has been argued by some that such as narrow view of the Christian Sabbath is overturned by St. Paul's letter to the Romans in which he writes: "One man esteemeth one day above another: another esteemeth every day alike. Let every man be fully persuaded in his own mind. He that regardeth the day, regardeth it unto the Lord; and he that regardeth not the day, to the Lord he doth not regard it." It is a mistake to suppose that the Apostle has the Sabbath in mind when writing these words. Such an erroneous supposition would be a wrenching of his words and meaning out of context. It must first be remembered that he is writing to a church whose members are made up of both Jewish and Gentile converts. Reliable Bible expositors, such as Adam Clarke, agree that "Reference is being made here to the Jewish institutions, and especially their festivals; such as the passover, pentecost, feast of tabernacles, new moons, jubilee, &c." Jewish Christians continued to think of these special days and festivals to be of moral obligation. In contrast, the Gentile Christians had never been trained to observe these special days related to the Jewish ceremonial law and therefore had no inclination nor desire to observe them. Furthermore, those who had been instrumental in their conversion enforced no such requirement upon them. In consequence, they paid no religious regard to these special days of the Jewish institution. "The converted Gentile", writes Clarke, "esteemeth every day—considers that all time is the Lord's and that each day should be devoted to the glory of God; and that those festivals are not binding on him." Accordingly, it is concluded that "With respect to the propriety or non-propriety of keeping the [Jewish special days and] festivals, 'Let every man be fully persuaded in his own mind'; there is sufficient latitude allowed; all may be fully satisfied. "Our translators have added the word "alike" in verse 5. This word, according to Clarke, "should not be added; nor it is acknowledged by any [manuscript] or ancient version." By adding the word "alike", they "make the text say what [we can be] sure was never intended, viz. that there is no distinction of days, not even the Sabbath: and that every Christian is at liberty to consider even this day to be holy or not holy, as he happens to be persuaded in his own mind." "That the Sabbath is of lasting obligation", writes Clarke, "may be reasonable concluded from its institution and from its typical references. All allow that the Sabbath is a type of rest in glory which remains for the people of God. Now, all types are intended to continue in full force till the antitype, or thing signified, take place; consequently, the Sabbath will continue in force till the consummation of all things" (Commentary, 6:151).

=== Spiritual rest ===
Non-Sabbatarians who affirm that Sabbath-keeping remains for God's people frequently regard this as present weeklong spiritual rest or future heavenly rest rather than as physical weekly rest. For instance, Irenaeus saw Sabbath rest from secular affairs for one day each week as a sign of the way that Christians were called to permanently devote themselves to God, and an eschatological symbol. One such interpretation of Hebrews states that seventh-day Sabbath is no longer relevant as a regular, literal day of rest, but instead is a symbolic metaphor for the eternal salvation "rest" that Christians enjoy in Christ, which was in turn prefigured by the promised land of Canaan.

The NT indicates that the sabbath followed its own channel and found its goal in Christ's redemptive work. It is true to the NT to say that the Mosaic Sabbath as a legal and weekly matter was a temporary symbol of a more fundamental and comprehensive salvation, epitomized by and grounded in God's own creation Sabbath, and brought to fulfillment (in already–not yet fashion) in Christ's redemptive work. Believers are indeed to "keep Sabbath", no longer by observance of a day of the week but now by the upholding of that to which it pointed: the gospel of the [Kingdom of God].

== Sabbatarian churches ==
=== Western Christianity ===
Much of Western Christianity came to view Sunday as a transference of Sabbath observance to the first day, identifying Sunday with a first-day "Christian Sabbath". While first-day Sabbatarian practice declined during the 18th century, leaving few modern followers, its concern for stricter Sunday observances did have influence in the West, shaping the origin of the Christian Sabbath. The term no longer applies to a specific set of practices, but tends to be used to describe the general establishment of Sunday worship and rest observances within Christianity. It does not necessarily imply the displacement of the Sabbath itself, which is often recognized as remaining on Saturday. As such, the Christian Sabbath generally represents a reinterpretation of the meaning of the Sabbath in the light of Christian law, emphases of practice, and values.

==== Roman Catholicism ====
In the Latin Church, Sunday is kept in commemoration of the resurrection of Jesus and celebrated with the Eucharist. The Lord's Day is considered both the first day and the "eighth day" of the week, symbolizing both first creation and new creation (2174). Roman Catholics view the first day as a day for assembly for worship. In the spirit of the Sabbath, Catholics ought to observe a day of rest from servile work, which also becomes "a day of protest against the servitude of work and the worship of money." This day is traditionally observed on Sunday in conjunction with the Lord's Day.

A summation of Catholic teaching is "Do what we can to observe the sabbatical rest on Sundays and Holy Days, hear Holy Mass, and take the time to rest your minds and bodies." The 1917 Code of Canon Law ¶1248 stipulated that "On feast days of precept, Mass is to be heard; there is an abstinence from servile work, legal acts, and likewise, unless there is a special indult or legitimate customs provide otherwise, from public trade, shopping, and other public buying and selling." Examples of servile works forbidden under this injunction include "plowing, sowing, harvesting, sewing, cobbling, tailoring, printing, masonry works" and "all works in mines and factories"; commercial activity, such as "marketing, fairs, buying and selling, public auctions, shopping in stores" is prohibited as well.

Seeking to uphold the Lord's Day Act in French Quebec, the Catholic Sunday League was formed in 1923 to promote First-day Sabbatarian restrictions in the province, especially against movie theaters.

In 1998 Pope John Paul II wrote an apostolic letter Dies Domini, "on keeping the Lord's day holy". He encouraged Catholics to remember the importance of keeping Sunday holy, urging that it not lose its meaning by being blended with a frivolous "weekend" mentality.

==== Lutheranism ====
Lutheran founder Martin Luther stated "I wonder exceedingly how it came to be imputed to me that I should reject the law of Ten Commandments. ...Whosoever abrogates the law must of necessity abrogate sin also." The Lutheran Augsburg Confession, speaking of changes made by Roman Catholic pontiffs, states: "They refer to the Sabbath-day as having been changed into the Lord's Day, contrary to the Decalogue, as it seems. Neither is there any example whereof they make more than concerning the changing of the Sabbath-day. Great, say they, is the power of the Church, since it has dispensed with one of the Ten Commandments!" Lutheran church historian Augustus Neander states "The festival of Sunday, like all other festivals, was always only a human ordinance".

Lutheran writer Marva Dawn keeps a whole day as Sabbath, advocating for rest during any weekly complete 24-hour period and favoring rest from Saturday sunset to Sunday sunset, but regarding corporate worship as "an essential part of God's Sabbath reclamation."

=== Eastern Christianity ===
Eastern Orthodox, Eastern Lutheran and Eastern Catholic Churches distinguish between the Sabbath (Saturday) and the Lord's Day (Sunday), and both continue to play a special role for the faithful. Many parishes and monasteries will serve the Divine Liturgy on both Saturday morning and Sunday morning. The church never allows strict fasting on any Saturday (except Holy Saturday) or Sunday, and the fasting rules on those Saturdays and Sundays which fall during one of the fasting seasons (such as Great Lent, Apostles' Fast, etc.) are always relaxed to some degree. During Great Lent, when the celebration of the Liturgy is forbidden on weekdays, there is always Liturgy on Saturday as well as Sunday. The church also has a special cycle of Bible readings (Epistle and Gospel) for Saturdays and Sundays which is different from the cycle of readings allotted to weekdays. However, the Lord's Day, being a celebration of the Resurrection, is clearly given more emphasis. For instance, in the Russian Orthodox Church Sunday is always observed with an all-night vigil on Saturday night, and in all of the Eastern Churches it is amplified with special hymns which are chanted only on Sunday. If a feast day falls on a Sunday it is always combined with the hymns for Sunday (unless it is a Lord's Great Feast). Saturday is celebrated as a sort of afterfeast for the previous Sunday, on which several of the hymns from the previous Sunday are repeated.

In part, Eastern Christians continue to celebrate Saturday as Sabbath because of its role in the history of salvation: it was on a Saturday that Jesus "rested" in the cave tomb after the Passion. For this reason also, Saturday is a day for general commemoration of the departed, and special requiem hymns are often chanted on this day. Orthodox Christians make time to help the poor and needy as well on this day.

==== Eastern Orthodoxy ====
Orthodox Sunday worship is not a direct Sabbath observance. The Eastern Orthodox Church observes the first day (liturgical Sunday, beginning Saturday evening) as a weekly feast, the remembrance of Christ's resurrection, and a mini-Pascha. As such, it tends to hold the first place within a week's observances, sharing that place only with other major feasts which occur from time to time. The Divine Liturgy is always celebrated, joining the participants on earth with those who offer the worship in God's kingdom, and hence joining the first day to the eighth day, wherein the communion of the whole Church with Christ is fully realized. As such, it is never surpassed as a time for the Orthodox to assemble in worship.

The Church affirms its authority to appoint the time of this feast (and all observances) as deriving from the authority given to the apostles and passed to the bishops through the laying-on of hands, for the sake of the governance of the Church on earth, and under the guidance of the Holy Spirit. It does not treat Sunday worship as a transference of Sabbath worship, but identifies the Sabbath, still on Saturday, as a Biblical "type", a precursor, realized fully only after Christ's fulfillment of the Mosaic Law. Thus, the Sabbath and the Mosaic Law both remain as a teacher, reminding Christians to worship in holiness, but now according to grace, in Christian observations and Sunday worship.

The grace received in baptism binds the Church to Christ, who has given his people the freedom to seek him directly in relationship, not to pursue whatever suits one's fancy. The goal of that freedom is always union with Christ in theosis, and the maintenance of that union all the time, throughout this life and into the next, which is sometimes described as the "sanctification of time". Grace therefore never permits of whatever is sinful or unhelpful to salvation, such as laziness or hedonistic revelry. Rather, it becomes a stricter guide for behavior than any legal code, even the Mosaic, and disciplines the believer in some degree of ascetic endeavor.

Orthodoxy recognizes no mandated time for rest, a day or any other span, but the Church leads the individual to holiness in different ways, and recognizes the need for economy and for rest. Activities such as sleep, relaxation, and recreation become a matter of balance and proper handling, and acceptance of God's mercy. St. Basil the Great expresses thanks for this in a prayer often said by Orthodox Christians in the morning, after rising: "You do we bless, O Most High God and Lord of mercy, ... Who has given unto us sleep for rest from our infirmity, and for repose of our much-toiling flesh." In recognition of God's gifts, therefore, the Church welcomes and supports civil laws that provide a day away from labor, which then become opportunities for Christians to pray, rest, and engage in acts of mercy. In grace do Christians respond, remembering both the example of the Sabbath rest, and Christ's lordship.

=== Church of Jesus Christ of Latter-day Saints ===
In 1831, Joseph Smith published a revelation commanding his related movement, the formative Church of Christ (Latter Day Saints) to go to the house of prayer, offer up their sacraments, have a day or rest, and pay their devotions on the Lord's day (D&C 59:9–12). Latter Day Saints believe this means performing no labor that would keep them from giving their full attention to spiritual matters (Ex. 20:10). LDS prophets have described this as meaning they should not shop, hunt, fish, attend sports events, or participate in similar activities on that day. Elder Spencer W. Kimball wrote in his The Miracle of Forgiveness that mere idle lounging on the Sabbath does not keep the day holy, and that it calls for constructive thoughts and acts.

Members of the Church of Jesus Christ of Latter-day Saints (LDS Church, informally Mormons) are encouraged to prepare their meals with "singleness of heart" on the Sabbath and believe the day is only for righteous activities (Is. 58:13). In most areas of the world, Latter-day Saints worship on Sunday.

== First-day sabbatarian churches and organizations ==
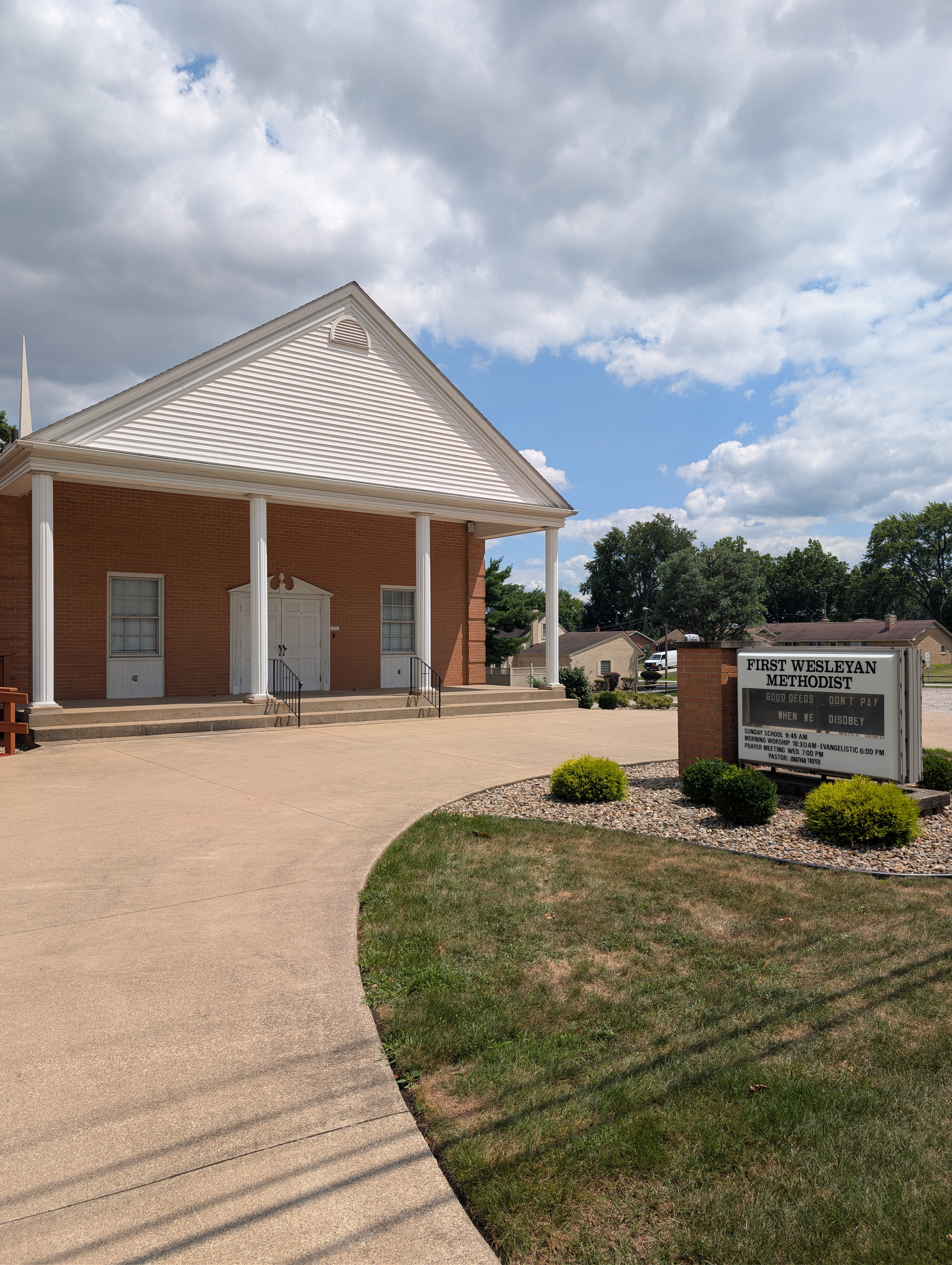
The sign of this Wesleyan Methodist church displays the times for the Sunday morning service of worship and Sunday evening service of worship, consistent with the historical First-day Sabbatarian doctrine of Methodism to keep the Lord's Day holy. The midweek Wednesday prayer service (a common Methodist observance) is indicated on the sign as well.

The observance of the Lord's Day (Sunday) as the Christian Sabbath is known as first-day Sabbatarianism and this view was historically heralded by nonconformist denominations, such as Congregationalists, Baptists, Presbyterians, and Methodists, as well as many Episcopalians. First-day sabbatarianism impacted popular Western Christian culture, with influences remaining to the present day, e.g. Sunday laws.

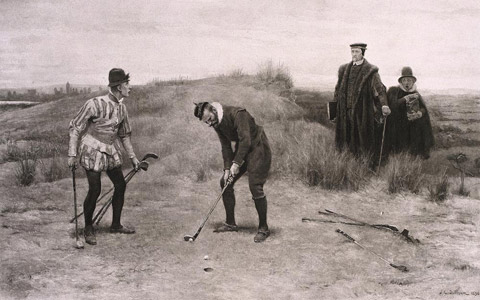
The Sabbath Breakers by J.C. Dollman (1896)

Organizations that promote Sunday Sabbatarianism include Day One Christian Ministries (formerly known as the Lord's Day Observance Society) in the UK. With unwavering support by mainstream Christian denominations, Sabbatarian organizations were formed, such as the American Sabbath Union (also known as the Lord's Day Alliance) and the Sunday League of America, following the American Civil War, to preserve the importance of Sunday as the Christian Sabbath. Founded in 1888, the Lord's Day Alliance continues to "encourage all people to recognize and observe a day of Sabbath rest and to worship the risen Lord Jesus Christ, on the Lord's Day, Sunday". The Board of Managers of the Lord's Day Alliance is composed of clergy and laity from Christian churches, including Baptist, Catholic, Episcopalian, Friends, Lutheran, Methodist, Non-Denominationalist, Orthodox, Presbyterian, and Reformed traditions. The Woman's Christian Temperance Union also supports Sabbatarian views and worked to reflect these in the public sphere. In Canada, the Lord's Day Alliance (renamed the People for Sunday Association of Canada) was founded there and it lobbied successfully to pass in 1906 the Lord's Day Act, which was not repealed until 1985. Throughout their history, Sabbatarian organizations, such as the Lord's Day Alliance, have mounted campaigns, with support in both Canada and Britain from labour unions with the goals of preventing secular and commercial interests from hampering freedom of worship and preventing them from exploiting workers.

The founder of the Moody Bible Institute declared, "Sabbath was binding in Eden, and it has been in force ever since. This fourth commandment begins with the word 'remember,' showing that the Sabbath already existed when God wrote the law on the tables of stone at Sinai. How can men claim that this one commandment has been done away with when they will admit that the other nine are still binding?"

=== Presbyterian, Congregationalist and Particular Baptist ===
The Westminster Confession, historically upheld by Presbyterians, commands the belief of first-day Sabbatarian doctrine:

As it is the law of nature, that, in general, a due proportion of time be set apart for the worship of God; so, in his Word, by a positive, moral, and perpetual commandment binding all men in all ages, he hath particularly appointed one day in seven, for a Sabbath, to be kept holy unto him: which, from the beginning of the world to the resurrection of Christ, was the last day of the week; and, from the resurrection of Christ, was changed into the first day of the week, which, in Scripture, is called the Lord's day, and is to be continued to the end of the world, as the Christian Sabbath.
This Sabbath is then kept holy unto the Lord, when men, after a due preparing of their hearts, and ordering of their common affairs beforehand, do not only observe a holy rest, all the day, from their own works, words, and thoughts about their worldly employments and recreations, but also are taken up, the whole time, in the public and private exercises of his worship, and in the duties of necessity and mercy.

The Savoy Declaration, upheld by Congregationalists, as well as the Second London Baptist Confession, upheld by Particular Baptists, advanced first-day Sabbatarian views identical to those expressed in the Westminster Confession.

=== General Baptist ===
General Baptists also advocate Sunday Sabbatarian doctrine in their confessions of faith; for example, the Orthodox Creed states:

[...] And in order to his being worshipped, and served, God hath instituted one Day in Seven, for his Sabbath to be kept holy unto him; which from the Resurrection of Christ, is the First Day of the Week, which is called the Lord’s Day, and is to be observed and continued to the end of the World, as a Christian Sabbath, the last Day of the Week being abolished. And this Christian Sabbath is to be kept after a due and reverent manner, in preparing of our Hearts, and ordering of Affairs so beforehand, that we may rest that Day from Worldly and Carnal Imployments, and frequent the solemn Assemblies of the Church, and in all publick and private Duties of Religion; as Hearing, Meditating, and Conferring, and Reading in, or of the holy Scriptures, together with Prayer, publick and private, and in the duties of Necessity, Charity, and Mercy, and not in any vain or Worldly Discourse, or idle Recreations whatsoever.

Treatise on the Faith and Practice of the Free Will Baptists, adopted by Free Will Baptists, a sub-group of American General Baptists, also defends the Sabbath as Sunday, stating:

This is one day in seven, which from the creation of the world God has set apart for sacred rest and holy service. Under the former dispensation, the seventh day of the week, as commemorative of the work of creation, was set apart for the Lord's Day. Under the gospel, the last day of the week, in commemoration of the resurrection of Christ, and by authority of Christ and the apostles, is observed as the Christian Sabbath. On this day all men are required to refrain from secular labor and devote themselves to the worship and service of God.

=== Quaker ===
The Richmond Declaration, a confession of faith held by the Orthodox branch of the Religious Society of Friends (Quakerism), teaches with regard to the First Day of the Week:

Whilst the remembrance of our Creator ought to be at all times present with the Christian, we would express our thankfulness to our Heavenly Father that He has been pleased to honor the setting apart of one day in seven for the purposes of holy rest, religious duties, and public worship; and we desire that all under our name may avail themselves of this great privilege as those who are called to be risen with Christ, and to seek those things that are above where He sitteth at the right hand of God. (Col 3:1) May the release thus granted from other occupations be diligently improved. On this day of the week especially ought the households of Friends to be assembled for the reading of the Scriptures and for waiting upon the Lord; and we trust that, in a Christianly wise economy of our time and strength, the engagements of the day may be so ordered as not to frustrate the gracious provision thus made for us by our Heavenly Father, or to shut out the opportunity either for public worship or for private retirement and devotional reading.

=== Schwarzenau Brethren ===
The Church Polity of the Dunkard Brethren Church, a Conservative Anabaptist denomination in the Schwarzenau Brethren tradition, teaches that "The First Day of the week is the Christian Sabbath and is to be kept as a day of rest and worship. (Matt. 28:1; Acts 20:7; John 20:1; Mark 16:2)"

=== United Brethren ===
The Church of the United Brethren in Christ, in its membership standards codified in the Book of Discipline, teaches in its position on the Lord's Day Observance:

1. Following the example of the early disciples and New Testament church, everyone should make provision for exercises of devotion on Sunday, the Lord's Day, and inasmuch as possible shall attend all services for hearing read the Word of God, singing spiritual songs and hymns, Christian fellowship, and giving of tithes and offerings (John 20:19, 1 Corinthians 16:2, Hebrews 10:25). 2. Members are admonished to neither buy nor sell needlessly on the Lord's Day.

These standards expect the faithful to honour the Lord's Day by attending the morning service of worship and the evening service of worship on the Lord's Day, in addition to not engaging in Sunday trading.

=== Methodist ===
In keeping with historic Methodism, the Discipline of the Bible Methodist Connection of Churches enshrines first-day Sabbatarianism:

We believe that the Lord's Day, celebrated on Sunday, the first day of the week, throughout the Christian church, is the Christian sabbath, which we reverently observe as a day of rest and worship and as the continuing memorial of our Savior's resurrection. For this reason, we abstain from secular work and from all merchandising on this holy day, except that required by mercy or necessity.

Regarded as the "prince of Methodist theologians" William Burt Pope explained that "Its [the Sabbath] original purpose to commemorate the creation and bear witness to the government of the One God was retained, but, as the new creation of mankind in Christ Jesus had more fully revealed the Triune God, the day of the Lord's resurrection, the first day of the week, became the Christian Sabbath, or the Lord's Day". Pope delineated that the Christian Sabbath was "given by Christ Himself, the Lord also of the Sabbath" as with "His resurrection began a formal appointment of the First day, and with the Pentecost He finally ratified it." Methodist systematic theologian Richard Watson delineated that the observance of the Sabbath is part of the unchanging moral law, and "its observance is connected throughout the prophetic age with the highest promises, its violations with the severest maledictions; it was among the Jews in our Lord's time a day of solemn religious assembling, and was so observed by him; when changed to the first day of the week, it was the day on which the Christians assembled; it was called, by way of eminence, 'the Lord's day;' and we have inspired authority to say, that both under the Old and New Testament dispensations, it is used as an expressive type of the heavenly and eternal rest."

Methodist churches have historically observed the Lord's Day devoutly with a morning service of worship, along with an evening service of worship.

=== Holiness Pentecostalism ===
Churches in the Holiness Pentecostal tradition hold to the historic Methodist views on the Lord's Day; Holiness Pentecostal churches have a morning service of worship and an evening service of worship on the Lord's Day. To this end, Holiness Pentecostal churches "oppose the increasing commercialization and secularization of Sunday." The 1900 Book of Discipline of the Fire-Baptized Holiness Church, a Holiness Pentecostal denomination, states:

Every member of the Fire-Baptized Holiness Association of America shall be required to observe the Lord's Day according to the teachings of Jesus Christ and the holy apostles, and to abstain from doing their own pleasure thereon.

== Seventh-day sabbatarian churches ==
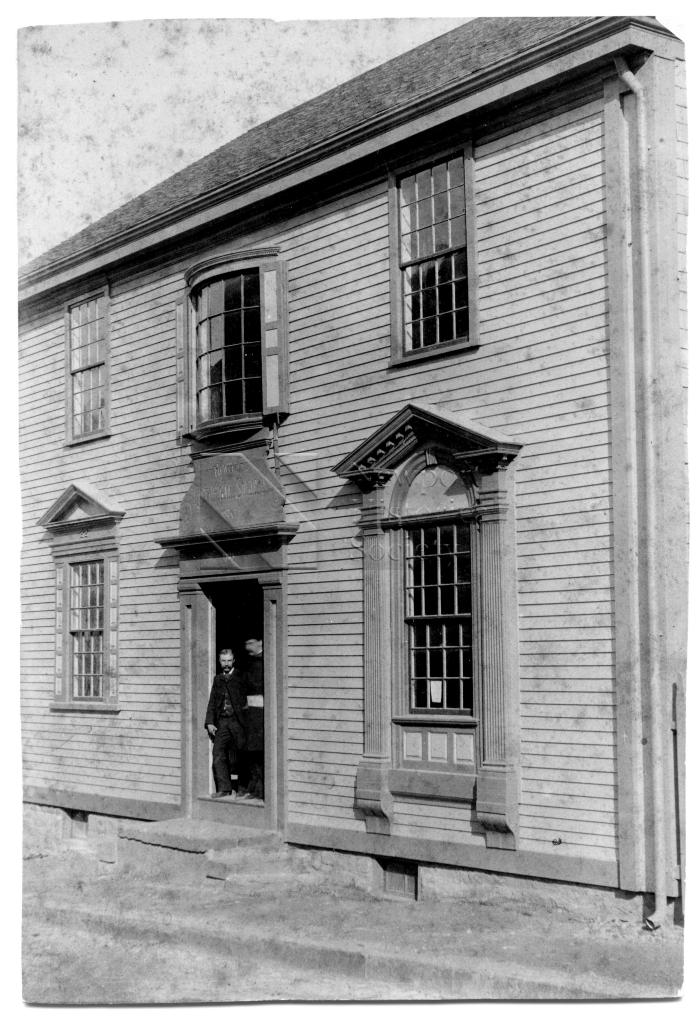
The oldest Sabbatarian church in the Americas (Seventh Day Baptist) built in 1730, Newport, Rhode Island.

Seventh-day Protestants regard Sabbath as a day of rest not just for Israel, but for all mankind. This belief is based on God resting on the seventh day of creation, the 4th Commandment given to Moses, Jesus's statement, "the Sabbath was made for man", affirmations of the Sabbath throughout the Bible, and on early-church Sabbath meetings. Additionally some Seventh-day Christians would argue any commandment given to "Israel" ought to be observed by Christians as, through faith in the Messiah of Israel, all Christians become members of the commonwealth of Israel and partake of the covenants God made with Israel, (see Ephesians 2:11-22). Seventh-day Sabbatarianism has been criticized as an effort to combine "Old Testament" laws, allegedly practiced in Judaism, with "Christianity", or to revive the Judaizers of the Epistles or the Ebionites. These criticisms assume a discontinuity between obedience as prescribed in the "Old Testament" and "Christianity", which is a concept, entirely foreign to biblical Christianity, according to the proponents of Seventh-day Sabbatarianism.

Seventh-day Sabbatarians practice a seventh-day Sabbath observance, that is almost entirely distinct from Shabbat in Judaism. While Rabbinic Halakah requires strict adherence to a plethora of minutiae detailed throughout Talmudic and Rabbinic texts, the Sabbath observance practiced by Sabbatarian Christians focuses on honoring and observing the day in accordance with the teachings of Jesus Christ, the Lord of the Sabbath. The beginning took place in London, where the follower of preacher John Traske (1586–1636), called Hamlet Jackson, self-taught Bible student, convinced Traske of the observance of the seventh day. Many followers adhered to Sabbath observance after Traske's writings and preaching, including his wife Dorothy Traske.

In 1650, James Ockford published in London the book The Doctrine of the Fourth Commandment, Deformed by Popery, Reformed & Restored to its Primitive Purity, which was the first writings of a Baptist defending Sabbath observance. Their ideas gave rise to the Seventh Day Baptists, formed in early 17th-century in England. The establishment of the first Seventh Day Baptist Church was in 1651, is the oldest modern seventh-day Sabbath denomination. The couple Stephen and Anne Mumford were the first Seventh Day Baptists in the Americas, and with five other Baptists who kept the Sabbath, they established in 1672 the first Seventh Day Baptist Church in the Americas, located in Newport, expanding into other territories.

The Worldwide Church of God, "W.C.G.," now known as Grace Communion International, "G.C.I.", established by Herbert W. Armstrong in the 1930s, formerly taught strict seventh-day Sabbath observance. Since Armstrong's death in 1986, G.C.I. no longer recognizes seventh-day Sabbath observance as a strict doctrinal requirement. United Church of God, Philadelphia Church of God, and International Church of God, denominations begun by former W.C.G. members disillusioned by W.C.G.'s abandonment of Armstrongism, continue to adhere to the seventh-day Sabbath requirement.

=== Seventh-day Adventist Church ===
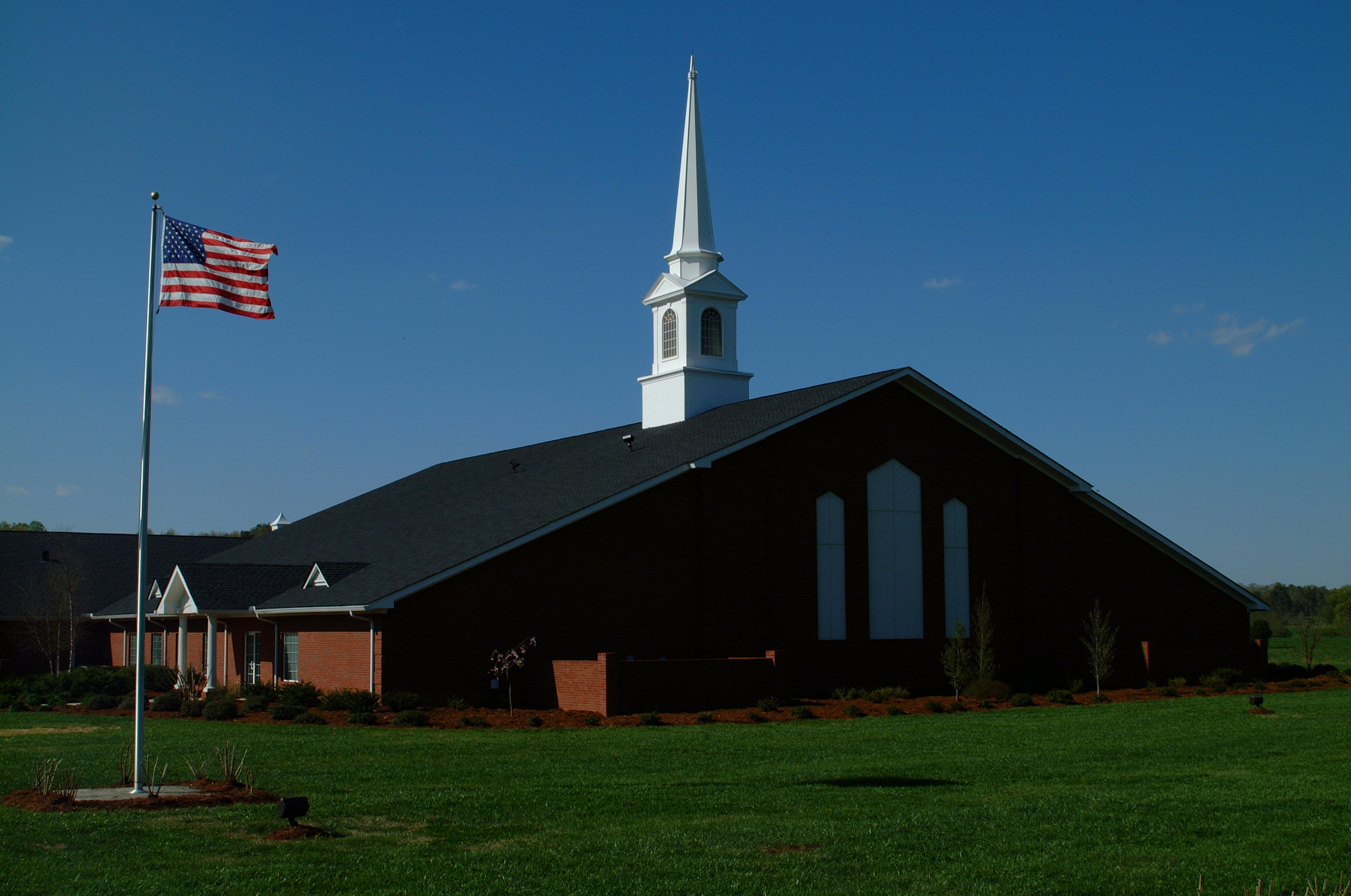
A Seventh-day Adventist Church.

The Seventh-day Adventist Church arose in the mid-19th century in America after Rachel Oakes, a Seventh Day Baptist, gave a tract about the Sabbath to an Adventist Millerite, who passed it on to Ellen G. White.

Fundamental Belief # 20 of the Seventh-day Adventist Church states:

The beneficent Creator, after the six days of Creation, rested on the seventh day and instituted the Sabbath for all people as a memorial of Creation. The fourth commandment of God's unchangeable law requires the observance of this seventh-day Sabbath as the day of rest, worship, and ministry in harmony with the teaching and practice of Jesus, the Lord of the Sabbath. The Sabbath is a day of delightful communion with God and one another. It is a symbol of our redemption in Christ, a sign of our sanctification, a token of our allegiance, and a foretaste of our eternal future in God's kingdom. The Sabbath is God's perpetual sign of His eternal covenant between Him and His people. Joyful observance of this holy time from evening to evening, sunset to sunset, is a celebration of God's creative and redemptive acts.

— Seventh-day Adventist Fundamental Beliefs

== Related terms ==
By synecdoche the term "Sabbath" in the New Testament may also mean simply a "se'nnight" or seven-day week, namely, the interval between two Sabbaths. Jesus's parable of the Pharisee and the Publican describes the Pharisee as fasting "twice a week" (Greek dis tou sabbatou, literally, "twice of the Sabbath").

Seven annual Biblical festivals, called by the name miqra ("called assembly") in Hebrew and "High Sabbath" in English, serve as supplemental testimonies to Sabbath. These are recorded in the books of Exodus and Deuteronomy and do not necessarily occur on the Sabbath. They are observed by Jews and a minority of Christians. Three of them occur in spring: the first and seventh days of Passover, and Pentecost. Four occur in fall, in the seventh month, and are also called Shabbaton: the Christian Feast of Trumpets; Yom Kippur, "Sabbath of Sabbaths"; and the first and eighth days of Tabernacles.

The year of Shmita (Hebrew שמיטה, literally, "release"), also called Sabbatical Year, is the seventh year of the seven-year agricultural cycle mandated by the Torah for the Land of Israel. During Shmita, the land is to be left to lie fallow. A second aspect of Shmita concerns debts and loans: when the year ends, personal debts are considered nullified and forgiven.

Jewish Shabbat is a weekly day of rest cognate to Christian Sabbath, observed from sundown on Friday until the appearance of three stars in the sky on Saturday night; it is also observed by a minority of Christians. Customarily, Shabbat is ushered in by lighting candles shortly before sunset, at halakhically calculated times that change from week to week and from place to place.

The new moon, occurring every 29 or 30 days, is an important separately sanctioned occasion in Judaism and some other faiths. It is not widely regarded as Sabbath, but some Hebrew Roots and Pentecostal churches, such as the native New Israelites of Peru and the Creation Seventh Day Adventist Church, do keep the day of the new moon as Sabbath or rest day, from evening to evening. New-moon services can last all day.

In South Africa, Christian Boers have celebrated December 16, the Day of the Vow (now called the Day of Reconciliation, as annual Sabbath (holy day of thanksgiving) since 1838, commemorating a famous Boer victory over the Zulu Kingdom.

Many early Christian writers from the 2nd century, such as pseudo-Barnabas, Irenaeus, Justin Martyr and Hippolytus of Rome followed rabbinic Judaism (the Mishna) in interpreting Sabbath not as a literal day of rest but as a thousand-year reign of Jesus Christ, which would follow six millennia of world history.

Secular use of "Sabbath" for "rest day", while it usually refers to Sunday, is often stated in North America to refer to different purposes for the rest day than those of Christendom. In McGowan v. Maryland (1961), the Supreme Court of the United States held that contemporary Maryland blue laws (typically, Sunday rest laws) were intended to promote the secular values of "health, safety, recreation, and general well-being" through a common day of rest, and that this day coinciding with majority Christian Sabbath neither reduces its effectiveness for secular purposes nor prevents adherents of other religions from observing their own holy days.

== See also ==
- Gregorian calendar
