= Gallagher v. Crown Kosher Super Market of Massachusetts, Inc. =

- Supreme Court of the United States

Argued December 7–8, 1960 Decided May 29, 1961
- Full case name: Gallagher, Chief of Police of Springfield, Massachusetts, et al. v. Crown Kosher Super Market of Massachusetts, Inc., et al.
- Citations: 366 U.S. 617 (more) 81 S. Ct. 1122; 6 L. Ed. 2d 536; 1961 U.S. LEXIS 1060; 42 Lab. Cas. (CCH) ¶ 50,261; 17 Ohio Op. 2d 195

Case history
- Prior: Appeal from the United States District Court for the District of Massachusetts

Holding
- A state law banning Sunday selling is constitutional even when applied to a kosher butcher.

Court membership
- Chief Justice Earl Warren Associate Justices Hugo Black · Felix Frankfurter; William O. Douglas · Tom C. Clark; John M. Harlan II · William J. Brennan Jr. Charles E. Whittaker · Potter Stewart

Case opinions
- Plurality: Warren, joined by Black, Clark, Whittaker
- Concurrence: Frankfurter, joined by Harlan
- Dissent: Douglas
- Dissent: Brennan, Stewart

Gallagher v. Crown Kosher Super Market of Massachusetts, Inc., 366 U.S. 617 (1961), is a United States Supreme Court case that declared that a kosher butcher store had to abide by the state laws that banned them from selling on Sunday.

== Background ==
The owners of the Crown Kosher Super Market of Massachusetts, who were Orthodox Jews whose religion forbids them to shop or sell from sundown on Friday until sundown on Saturday and requires them to eat only kosher food, were keeping their store open on Sunday at times when it was against the Massachusetts state law.

The lawsuit was in a Federal District Court to make certain sections of the Massachusetts Sunday Closing Laws unconstitutional. Specifically, "the selling or delivering of kosher meat by any person who, according to his religious belief, observes Saturday as the Lord's day by closing his place of business during the day until six o'clock in the afternoon, or the keeping open of his shop on the Lord's day for the sale of kosher meat between the hours of six o'clock and ten o'clock in the forenoon."

The store had formerly been open for business all day on Sundays and had done about a third of its weekly business then. It was closed from sundown on Fridays until sundown on Saturdays. The store had claimed that it was economically impractical for it to keep open on Saturday nights and until 10 a.m. on Sundays. Many who bought at the store would not have been able to get meat from Friday afternoon until Monday.

== Counsel of Record ==
ACLU Side: Herbert B. Ehrmann, with Samuel L. Fein on the brief.

Opposing Side: Joseph H. Elcock, Jr., Asst. Attorney General of Massachusetts. With him on the brief were Edward J. McCormack, Jr., John Warren McGarry, Arthur E. Sutherland, Jr., and S. Thomas Martinelli.

== Opinion of the Court ==
The court 6-3 approved the state law, due to the laws not being exclusively religious. "An examination of recent Massachusetts legislative history bolsters the State's position that these statutes are not religious.

"In general, Sunday laws protect the public by guaranteeing one day in seven to provide a period of rest and quiet. Health, peace and good order of society are thereby promoted. Such provision is essentially civil in character, and the statutes are not regarded as religious ordinances."

Also on the issue of free exercise of religion they stated: "Secondly, appellees Orthodox Jewish customers allege that, because their religious beliefs forbid their shopping on the Jewish Sabbath, the statutes' effect is to deprive them, from Friday afternoon until Monday of each week, of the opportunity to purchase the kosher food sanctioned by their faith. The orthodox rabbis allege that the statutes' effect greatly complicates their task of supervising the condition of kosher meat, because the meat delivered on Friday would have to be kept until Monday. Furthermore, appellees contend that, because of all this, the statutes discriminate against their religion.

These allegations are similar, although not as grave, as those made by appellants in Braunfeld v. Brown, ante, p. 366 U.S. 599. Since the decision in that case rejects the contentions presented by these appellees on the merits, we need not decide whether appellees have standing to raise these questions."

Justices William O. Douglas, William J. Brennan, Jr. and Potter Stewart dissented from the opinion.

== Subsequent developments ==
This was one of the four cases decided in 1961 that declared "Sunday closing" blue laws to be constitutional. The other three were Braunfeld v. Brown, Two Guys from Harrison-Allentown, Inc. v. McGinley and McGowan v. Maryland.

In the 1977 case Trans World Airlines, Inc. v. Hardison, the court held that firing an employee who observed a seventh-day sabbath did not constitute religious discrimination as prohibited by Civil Rights Act of 1964 § Title VII—equal employment opportunity

== See also ==
- McGowan v. Maryland: another blue law court case
- List of United States Supreme Court cases, volume 366
