= Lord's Day Alliance =

Religious advocacy group

Lord's Day Alliance (LDA) American Sabbath Union
- Formation: 1888 Washington, D.C., U.S.
- Purpose: To promote the Lord's Day, Sunday, as a day of Sabbath rest
- Location: Atlanta, Georgia
- Key people: Rodney Petersen (Executive Director)
- Main organ: Board of Managers
- Affiliations: People for Sunday Association of Canada
- Website: risingdayministries.com

The Lord's Day Alliance (formerly known as the American Sabbath Union) is an ecumenical Christian first-day Sabbatarian organization. Based in the United States and Canada, the organization was founded in 1888 by mainstream Christian denominations. These Churches worked together to found the Lord's Day Alliance in order to effect change in the public sphere, specially with respect to "lobbying for the passage of Sunday-rest laws." The Lord's Day Alliance publishes a biannual magazine called eSunday Magazine.

Erwin Fahlbusch and Geoffrey William Bromiley write that throughout its existence, the Lord's Day Alliance, supported by labor unions, has lobbied "to prevent secular and commercial interests from hampering freedom of worship and from exploiting workers." For example, the United States Congress was supported by the Lord's Day Alliance in securing "a day of rest for city postal clerks whose hours of labor, unlike those of city mail carriers, were largely unregulated."

The Canadian branch of Lord's Day Alliance (now known as the People for Sunday Association of Canada) was successful in passing the Lord's Day Act in 1906, which remained in force until 1985.

== Mission ==
The Lord's Day Alliance continues to "encourage all people to recognize and observe a day of Sabbath rest and to worship the risen Lord Jesus Christ, on the Lord's Day, Sunday".

== Organization ==
The Board of Managers of the Lord's Day Alliance is composed of clergy and laity from Christian churches, including Baptist, Catholic, Episcopalian, Friends, Lutheran, Methodist, Non-Denominationalist, Orthodox, Presbyterian and Reformed traditions.

== See also ==
- Day One Christian Ministries
- First Liberty Institute
- Woman's Christian Temperance Union
