= Alaska v. Arctic Maid =

Supreme Court of the United States case

- Supreme Court of the United States

Argued March 23, 1961 Decided May 1, 1961
- Full case name: Alaska v. Arctic Maid, et al.
- Citations: 366 U.S. 199 (more)

Case history
- Prior: Arctic Maid v. Territory of Alaska, 277 F.2d 120 (9th Cir. 1960)

Holding
- Alaska's statute imposing an annual tax on freezer ships does not violate the Commerce Clause.

Court membership
- Chief Justice Earl Warren Associate Justices Hugo Black · Felix Frankfurter; William O. Douglas · Tom C. Clark; John M. Harlan II · William J. Brennan Jr. Charles E. Whittaker · Potter Stewart

Case opinions
- Majority: Douglas, joined by Warren, Black, Frankfurter, Clark, Brennan, Whittaker, Stewart
- Dissent: Harlan

Laws applied
- U.S. Const. art. I sec. 8 clause 3

Alaska v. Arctic Maid, 366 U.S. 199 (1961), is a decision by the Supreme Court of the United States in which the Court upheld the constitutionality of an Alaskan law that imposed an annual tax on freezer ships operating in Alaskan waters, even if the fish onboard is canned and sold in another state.

== Background ==
Before Alaska was granted statehood in 1959, Alaska was a U.S. Territory whose laws were enacted by the First Territorial Legislature of Alaska. In 1951, the Territorial Legislature amended the tax code to levy an annual licensing tax on persons or corporations operating freezer ships in Alaska's territorial waters for commercial fishing. The tax was to be "equal to 4% of the value of the raw halibut, halibut livers and viscera, salmon and bottom fish, shellfish or other fishing resource bought or otherwise obtained for processing through freezing".

Several fisheries operated freezer ships in the Bristol Bay area, which was "a famous fishing ground for salmon". Because of Bristol Bay's shallow waters, salmon would be caught by small catcher boats, then transported to larger freezer ships docked about three miles from the shoreline. The freezer ships would serve as the base for the fisheries' operations and would sometimes be inside Alaska's territorial waters, which extended three miles from the coast, and would sometimes be beyond it. On the freezer ships, the salmon would be frozen and kept in cold storage before eventually being sent to Puget Sound in the State of Washington for canning.

Alaska filed suit against seven fisheries, including Arctic Maid Fisheries, to collect taxes that the fisheries had not paid. The fisheries countersued, claiming that the law was an invalid burden on interstate commerce because the salmon, although caught in Alaskan waters, was canned and sold on the market in Washington. The District Court of Alaska held in favor of the fisheries, finding that the freezing of fish is not a taxable event. The state of Alaska appealed the decision to the Ninth Circuit Court of Appeals, which heard oral arguments on January 13, 1958. The Ninth Circuit ruled in favor of the fisheries on March 23, 1960.

== Opinion of the Court ==
Oral arguments were held on March 23, 1961. Gary Thurlow argued the case for Alaska and Martin Detels Jr. argued the case for the fisheries. In an 8–1 opinion delivered by Justice William O. Douglas, the Court held that the statute does not violate the Commerce Clause of the Constitution's First Article. Justice John M. Harlan II filed a dissenting opinion.

== See also ==
- List of United States Supreme Court cases, volume 366
