= List of United States Supreme Court cases, volume 366 =

This is a list of all the United States Supreme Court cases from volume 366 of the United States Reports:

Case name	Citation	Date decided
Stewart v. United States (1961)	366 U.S. 1	1961
Goldberg v. Whitaker House Coop., Inc.	366 U.S. 28	1961
Konigsberg v. State Bar of Cal.	366 U.S. 36	1961
In re Anastaplo	366 U.S. 82	1961
Cohen v. Hurley	366 U.S. 117	1961
Smith v. Butler	366 U.S. 161	1961
Lush v. Comm'r of Ed.	366 U.S. 167	1961
Complete Auto Transit, Inc. v. Carpentier	366 U.S. 168	1961
Maintenance of Way Emps. v. United States	366 U.S. 169	1961
Kolovrat v. Oregon	366 U.S. 187	1961
Alaska v. Arctic Maid	366 U.S. 199	1961
Atchley v. California	366 U.S. 207	1961
Anderson v. Alabama	366 U.S. 208	1961
Chaifetz v. United States	366 U.S. 209	1961
Smith v. Smith	366 U.S. 210	1961
Binks Mfg. Co. v. Ransburg Electro-Coating Corp.	366 U.S. 211	1961
City of New Orleans v. Bush	366 U.S. 212	1961
Bologna v. Morrissey	366 U.S. 212	1961
James v. United States (1961)	366 U.S. 213	1961
Slagle v. Ohio	366 U.S. 259	1961
Ludwig v. Am. Greetings Corp.	366 U.S. 269	1961
Alatex Constr. Serv., Inc. v. Crawford	366 U.S. 269	1961
Harmon v. Harmon	366 U.S. 270	1961
Schaengold v. City of Cincinnati	366 U.S. 270	1961
Bond v. Green	366 U.S. 271	1961
H.K. Porter Co. v. Cent. Vt. R.R. Co.	366 U.S. 272	1961
Eli Lilly & Co. v. Sav-On-Drugs, Inc.	366 U.S. 276	1961
Louisiana ex rel. Gremillion v. NAACP	366 U.S. 293	1961
Comm'r v. Lester	366 U.S. 299	1961
Montana v. Kennedy	366 U.S. 308	1961
United States v. E.I. du Pont de Nemours & Co.	366 U.S. 316	1961
United States v. Consol. Edison Co.	366 U.S. 380	1961
Bell v. United States	366 U.S. 393	1961
Baldonado v. California	366 U.S. 417	1961
Bushnell v. Ellis	366 U.S. 418	1961
Herrin Transp. Co. v. United States	366 U.S. 419	1961
McGowan v. Maryland	366 U.S. 420	1961
Two Guys from Harrison-Allentown, Inc. v. McGinley	366 U.S. 582	1961
Braunfeld v. Brown	366 U.S. 599	1961
Gallagher v. Crown Kosher Super Market of Massachusetts, Inc.	366 U.S. 617	1961
United States v. Oregon (1961)	366 U.S. 643	1961
Pan Am. Petroleum Corp. v. Super. Ct.	366 U.S. 656	1961
Elec. Workers v. NLRB	366 U.S. 667	1961
Sam Fox Publ'g Co. v. United States	366 U.S. 683	1961
United States v. Neustadt	366 U.S. 696	1961
Lurk v. United States	366 U.S. 712	1961
Herron v. United States	366 U.S. 715	1961
Holekamp v. Holekamp Lumber Co.	366 U.S. 715	1961
Holt v. Oklahoma	366 U.S. 716	1961
Janko v. United States	366 U.S. 716	1961
Irvin v. Dowd	366 U.S. 717	1961
Garment Workers v. NLRB	366 U.S. 731	1961
Chi. M. St. P. & P.R.R. Co. v. United States	366 U.S. 745	1961
Payne v. Madigan	366 U.S. 761	1961
Giant Tiger Drugs, Inc. v. Ohio	366 U.S. 762	1961
Teamsters v. NLRB	366 U.S. 763	1961
Mohegan Int'l Corp. v. City of New York	366 U.S. 764	1961
Simcox v. Madigan	366 U.S. 765	1961
