= Braunfeld v. Brown =

- Supreme Court of the United States

Argued December 8, 1960 Decided May 29, 1961
- Full case name: Abraham Braunfeld, et al. v. Brown, Commissioner of Police of Philadelphia, et al.
- Citations: 366 U.S. 599 (more) 81 S. Ct. 1144; 6 L. Ed. 2d 563; 1961 U.S. LEXIS 1059; 42 Lab. Cas. (CCH) ¶ 50,260; 17 Ohio Op. 2d 241

Case history
- Prior: Appeal from the United States District Court for the Eastern District of Pennsylvania

Holding
- Where the "purpose or effect of a law is to impede the observance of one or all religions or is to discriminate invidiously between religions, that law is constitutionally invalid even though the burden may be characterized as being only indirect." However, where "the State regulates conduct by enacting a general law within its power, the purpose and effect of which is to advance the State's secular goals, the statute is valid despite its indirect burden on religious observance unless the State may accomplish its purpose by means which do not impose such a burden." In this specific case, a law requiring all merchants to close on Sunday was not unconstitutional, despite indirect burdens on some Orthodox Jewish merchants.

Court membership
- Chief Justice Earl Warren Associate Justices Hugo Black · Felix Frankfurter; William O. Douglas · Tom C. Clark; John M. Harlan II · William J. Brennan Jr. Charles E. Whittaker · Potter Stewart

Case opinions
- Plurality: Warren, joined by Black, Clark, Whittaker
- Concurrence: Harlan
- Concur/dissent: Frankfurter, joined by Harlan (in part)
- Concur/dissent: Brennan
- Dissent: Douglas
- Dissent: Stewart

Laws applied
- U.S. Const. amend. I

Braunfeld v. Brown, 366 U.S. 599 (1961), was a landmark case on the issue of religious and economic liberty decided by the United States Supreme Court. In a 6–3 decision, the Court held that a Pennsylvania blue law forbidding the sale of various retail products on Sunday was not an unconstitutional interference with religion as described in the First Amendment to the United States Constitution.

== Prior history ==
Blue laws in the United States had been passed by State legislatures, including Pennsylvania, prohibiting commerce the first day of the week, colloquially known as Sunday, which legislators referred to as "The Lord's day".

Plaintiffs sought to have a 1959 Pennsylvania statute, 18 Purdon's Pa. Stat. Ann. 4699.10 (1960 Cum. Supp.) overturned as unconstitutional. A three judge panel rejected their petition. (See Abraham Braunfeld v. Thomas J. Gibbons and Victor H. Blanc, 184 F. Supp. 352 (E.D.Pa 1959)).

The Court also based its opinion in part on two earlier rulings.

- In Two Guys from Harrison-Allentown, Inc. v. McGinley, 366 U.S. 582 (1961), the Court had previously ruled that the same Pennsylvania statute was not unconstitutional, either as (i) a violation of the Equal Protection Clause of the Fourteenth Amendment to the United States Constitution or (ii) an impermissible establishment of religion under the First Amendment to the United States Constitution. Therefore, the only remaining issue in Braunfeld was whether the Pennsylvania statute was an unconstitutional interference in the appellant's religion.
- In McGowan v. Maryland, 366 U.S. 420 (1961), the Court had previously held that a similar Maryland statute was constitutional.

== The case ==
=== Background ===
Abraham Braunfeld and the other appellants were Pennsylvania merchants. As Orthodox Jews, the appellants were unable to do business on Friday evening or Saturday. They objected to a Pennsylvania law forbidding them from doing business on Sunday, arguing that the law unfairly discriminated against them by effectively forcing them to remain closed for one more day than competing Christian merchants.

=== Plurality opinion ===
Chief Justice Warren wrote the plurality opinion, joined by Justices Black, Clark, and Whittaker.

- Chief Justice Warren first rejected appellants' Establishment Clause and Equal Protection Clause arguments, ruling that the Court's earlier opinion in Two Guys from Harrison-Allentown, Inc., v. McGinley, 366 U.S. 582 (1961) had concluded that the statute at issue did not violate either of those provisions. Braunfeld, 366 U.S. at 600–01.
- Chief Justice Warren then addressed appellants' remaining argument – that by requiring Orthodox Jewish merchants to remain closed for one day in addition to their religiously required day of rest, the statute unfairly burdened existing Orthodox Jews and made it more difficult for the religion to recruit more members, thereby violating the Free Exercise Clause of the First Amendment to the United States Constitution. Braunfeld, 366 U.S. at 601–02. Chief Justice Warren reasoned as follows:
  - While originally enacted for religious purposes, the so-called "Sunday Closing Laws" had a legitimate state purpose in providing for the general welfare by establishing a day of rest. Braunfeld, 366 U.S. at 602–03, citing McGowan, 366 U.S. at 437–40.
  - Although the Court had previously held that the Free Exercise Clause prevented the States from passing laws that forbade the exercise of religion or required citizens to "say or believe anything in conflict with [their] religious tenets," states could in some cases regulate conduct, even if that regulation burdened citizens of a particular religion. Braunfeld, 366 U.S. at 603–05.
  - In order to balance the interests at issue, the Court held that:
    1. Where the "purpose or effect of a law is to impede the observance of one or all religions or is to discriminate invidiously between religions, that law is constitutionally invalid even though the burden may be characterized as being only indirect." Braunfeld, 366 U.S. at 607.
    2. However, where "the State regulates conduct by enacting a general law within its power, the purpose and effect of which is to advance the State's secular goals, the statute is valid despite its indirect burden on religious observance unless the State may accomplish its purpose by means which do not impose such a burden." Braunfeld, 366 U.S. at 607.
  - In the specific case before the Court, the plurality opinion held that the law in question had only an indirect effect, and that the Court could not conclude that there was any less burdensome means of achieving the State's goals. In particular, although appellants argued that a law exempting citizens who were required to rest on other days from the Sunday rest day would be a wiser choice, the Court concluded that there were valid reasons for which a state might choose a single day of rest. Braunfeld, 366 U.S. at 607–09.

=== Concurrence/dissent (Frankfurter) ===
Justice Frankfurter wrote a concurring opinion with which Justice Harlan joined as to most points. (Justice Frankfurter published that opinion as part of McGowan v. Maryland, 366 U.S. 420 (1961), but declared his opinion applicable to Braunfeld and several other cases. McGowan, 366 U.S. at 459, fn).

- First, Justice Frankfurter examined the history of the First Amendment and "Sunday Statutes" in detail, and concluded that the Sunday statutes had a long history and substantial non-religious purpose. McGowan, 366 U.S. at 460–511.
- On that basis, Justice Frankfurter rejected most of the appellants' claims. McGowan, 366 U.S. at 511–42.
- However, Justice Frankfurter, writing solely for himself and not for Justice Harlan, did dissent on one point. Based on the procedural history of Braunfeld, Justice Frankfurter argued that appellants' claim that the law was irrational and arbitrary should not have been dismissed for failure to state a claim, but should have been permitted to proceed to an evidentiary stage. McGowan, 366 U.S. at 542–43.

=== Concurrence/dissent (Brennan) ===
In his opinion, Justice Brennan concurred in the plurality opinion to the extent that it held that the Pennsylvania statute did not violate the Establishment Clause or the Equal Protection Clause, but dissented from the remainder of the opinion, arguing that the statute should be held unconstitutional under the Free Exercise Clause. Justice Brennan wrote in part:

[T]he issue in this case – and we do not understand either appellees or the Court to contend otherwise – is whether a State may put an individual to a choice between his business and his religion. The Court today holds that it may. But I dissent, believing that such a law prohibits the free exercise of religion.

Two years later, Justice Brennan wrote a majority opinion, in Sherbert v. Verner, that largely tracked his dissent in this case. In the Sherbert case, the court struck down a law on Free Exercise grounds that prohibited a worker from collecting unemployment compensation who was terminated from her job because she would not work on Saturdays for religious reasons.

=== Dissent (Douglas) ===
Like Justice Frankfurter, Justice Douglas also published his Braunfeld dissent as part of the earlier McGowan decision, at 366 US 561–82. In that opinion, Justice Douglas argued that the "Sunday Laws" could not be separated from their religious roots, and that the imposition of those laws on persons of other religions violated both the Establishment Clause and the Free Exercise Clause of the First Amendment to the United States Constitution

=== Dissent (Stewart) ===
Justice Stewart joined Justice Brennan's dissent, and wrote further:

Pennsylvania has passed a law which compels an Orthodox Jew to choose between his religious faith and his economic survival. That is a cruel choice. It is a choice which I think no State can constitutionally demand. For me this is not something that can be swept under the rug and forgotten in the interest of enforced Sunday togetherness. I think the impact of this law upon these appellants grossly violates their constitutional right to the free exercise of their religion.

Braunfeld, 366 U.S. at 616.

== See also ==
- List of United States Supreme Court cases, volume 366
