= Montana v. Kennedy =

- Supreme Court of the United States

Decided May 22, 1961
- Full case name: Montana v. Kennedy
- Citations: 366 U.S. 308 (more)

Holding
- Petitioner is not a citizen of the United States because he lacks a statutory basis for claiming derivative citizenship.

Court membership
- Chief Justice Earl Warren Associate Justices Hugo Black · Felix Frankfurter; William O. Douglas · Tom C. Clark; John M. Harlan II · William J. Brennan Jr. Charles E. Whittaker · Potter Stewart

Montana v. Kennedy, 366 U.S. 308 (1961), was a U.S. Supreme Court case that determined the citizenship status of Mauro John Montana, who at the time of the case was a resident of the United States born to a naturalized U.S. Citizen mother and an alien Italian father in Italy. The court held that the petitioner (Montana) was not a U.S. Citizen on the grounds that the petitioner did not earn citizenship through R.S. § 2172 as was argued, or R.S. § 1993 which provided citizenship to foreign-born children whose fathers were citizens.

== Background ==
After residing in the United States for 55 years, Mauro John Montana's citizenship was contested when he was ordered to be deported in 1961. Prior to living in the United States, the petitioner (Montana) was born in Italy in 1906, to a native-born American mother, and an alien Italian father. The petitioner's mother and father (who were married) traveled to Italy with Mrs. Montana's parents in 1906 while Mrs. Montana was four months pregnant. Mrs. Montana, 15 at the time, attempted to return to the United States before the petitioner was born, and attempted to obtain a passport at the American Consular Office, but was allegedly denied both a passport and exit due to her pregnant condition. Even though a passport was not a requirement for a U.S. Citizen to return to or enter the country, Mrs. Montana heeded the advice of the American Consular Officer who allegedly denied her exit and remained in Italy to give birth to the petitioner, spending three months thereafter before returning to the U.S.

The petitioner was represented by attorney Anna R. Lavin, who argued that the petitioners claim to citizenship rested on four bases; the first claim lays under the Revised Statute § 2172, which states that "children of persons who now are, or have been citizens of the United States, shall, though born out of the limits and jurisdiction of the United States, be considered as citizens thereof..." Lavin argued that the words 'children of persons' were sufficient for the distribution of citizenship upon the petitioner, and that the words 'are now or have been' are not restricted to retroactive application.

The second claim regards the interpretation of the Act of March 2nd, 1907, which permitted the resumption of citizenship by an expatriated parent and the naturalization of their child accordingly. Lavin argued that this interpretation should not give more rights to a former expatriate than a native-born citizen, and because Mrs. Montana was not expatriated, she should not be treated as less than such an expatriate.

The third claim concerns the Act of May 24th, 1934, which bestows citizenship upon a foreign-born child of a United States Citizen parent. Although this act merely clarifies the uncertainties present in the Act of March 2, 1907, Lavin noted that this Act declares that citizenship may pass through either the mother or the father, whereas the Act of 1907 simply said parent.

The fourth and final claim states that the Government should not be allowed to argue that the petitioner was born outside of the United States due to its own misconduct. This claim was based on the notion that Mrs. Montana – who was 15 at the time – was allegedly denied exit from Italy by an American Consular Officer based on her pregnant condition when she attempted to obtain a passport to return to the United States.

The defense was argued by Charles Gordon, who sought a judicial declaration of citizenship by the court. Prior to reaching the Supreme Court, a trial court conducted a hearing de novo in the District Court and found that the petitioner had not established a claim to citizenship under the presented statutes, a ruling that was unanimously affirmed by the Court of Appeals.

== Decision ==
Justice Harlan delivered the opinion of the court, which ruled that the petitioner was not in fact a citizen. Regarding the first argument, the court ruled that R.S. § 2172 did not apply to the petitioner because the statute granted citizenship to foreign-born children of native-born parents who were born on or before the effective date of the statute in 1802, far earlier than the date upon which the petitioner was born. Therefore, R.S. § 1993 - which states that "All children heretofore born or hereafter born out of the limits and jurisdiction of the United States, whose fathers were or may be at the time of their birth citizens thereof, are declared to be citizens of the United States" - provided the sole source of citizenship for foreign-born individuals, therefore disqualifying Montana. Of the second and third arguments, the court ruled that the Act of March 2nd 1907 did not apply because Mrs. Montana needed to first be an alien at the time the petitioner was born, having lost citizenship, and second, that Mrs. Montana subsequently resumed her citizenship upon returning to the United States. Given that neither of these things were true, the court opposed the arguments. Finally, the court ruled against the fourth argument on the grounds that the United States did not require citizens to possess a passport upon returning to the United States, and that no evidence of an Italian requirement of an American passport was presented. Likewise, the court interpreted the American Consular Officers denial of exit as well-meant advice, falling short of misconduct such as might prevent the United States from relying on petitioner’s foreign birth.

The decision was rendered via an 8–1 majority, with Justice Douglas as the only dissenter.
