= Stewart v. United States (1961) =

- Supreme Court of the United States

Argued February 21, 1961 Decided April 24, 1961
- Full case name: Willie Lee Stewart v. United States
- Citations: 366 U.S. 1 (more) 81 S. Ct. 941; 6 L. Ed. 2d 84; 1961 U.S. LEXIS 1266

Holding
- Asking a criminal defendant whether he had testified in previous trials violated his Fifth Amendment rights.

Court membership
- Chief Justice Earl Warren Associate Justices Hugo Black · Felix Frankfurter; William O. Douglas · Tom C. Clark; John M. Harlan II · William J. Brennan Jr. Charles E. Whittaker · Potter Stewart

Case opinions
- Majority: Black, joined by Warren, Douglas, Brennan, Stewart
- Dissent: Frankfurter, joined by Harlan, Whittaker
- Dissent: Clark, joined by Whittaker

Stewart v. United States, 366 U.S. 1 (1961), was a United States Supreme Court case in which the Court held that asking a criminal defendant whether he had testified in previous trials violated his Fifth Amendment rights.

Willie Lee Stewart had already been tried twice for murder and had not testified in either trial. During his third trial his defense was insanity and he chose to testify in his own defense. During his cross-examination, the prosecutor asked, "This is the first time you have gone on the stand, isn't it, Willie?", alluding to the fact that Stewart had not testified in his first two trials. Stewart's attorney objected and ultimately appealed Stewart's criminal conviction to the Supreme Court.

The Fifth Amendment provides a criminal defendant with a right to refuse to testify. Relying on that provision, the Court held that the prosecutor's question was unduly prejudicial and unconstitutional. The Court further held that the error was not harmless and remanded for a new trial.
