= Blue law =

Legal restrictions designated for Sunday activity

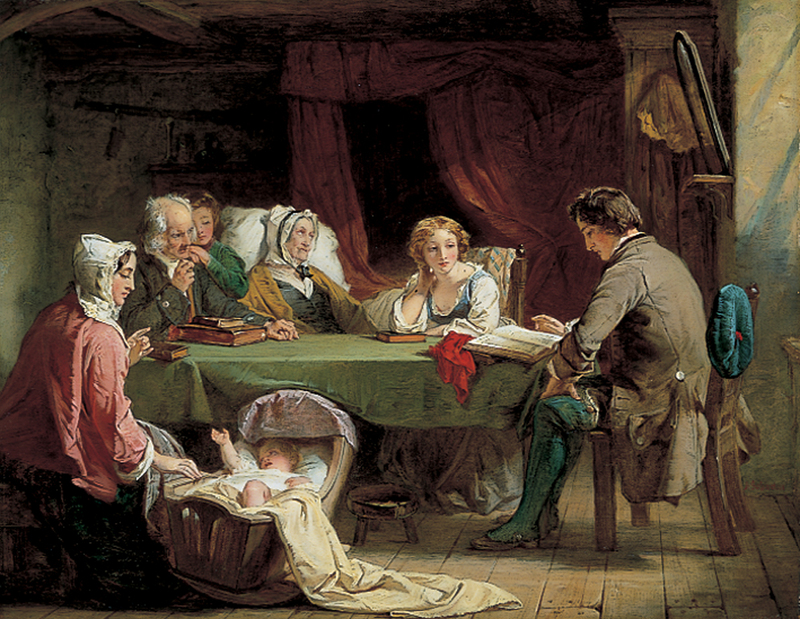
Sabbath Eve, painting by Alexander Johnston

Blue laws (also known as Sunday laws, Sunday trade laws, and Sunday closing laws) are laws restricting or banning certain activities on specified days, usually Sundays in the western world. The laws were adopted originally for religious reasons, specifically to promote the observance of the Christian day of worship. Since then, they have come to serve secular purposes as well.

Blue laws commonly ban certain business and recreational activities on Sundays, and impose restrictions on the retail sale of hard goods and consumables, particularly alcoholic beverages. The laws also place limitations on a range of other endeavors—including travel, fashions, hunting, professional sports, stage performances, movie showings, and gambling. While less prevalent today, blue laws continue to be enforced in parts of the United States and Canada as well as in European countries, such as Austria, Germany, Norway, and Poland, where most stores are required to close on Sundays.

In the United States, the Supreme Court has upheld blue laws as constitutional despite their religious origins if supported by secular justifications. This has resulted in the provision of a day of rest for the general population. Meanwhile, various state courts have struck down the laws as either unenforceable or in violation of their states' constitutions. In response, state legislators have re-enacted certain Sunday laws to satisfy the rulings while allowing some of the other statutes to remain on the books with no intention to enforce them.

== History ==
The Roman Emperor Constantine promulgated the first known law regarding prohibition of Sunday labour for apparent religion-associated reasons in A.D. 321:

On the venerable Day of the Sun let the magistrates and people residing in cities rest, and let all workshops be closed.

— Codex Justinianus, lib. 3, tit. 12, 3

The earliest laws in North America addressing Sunday activities and public behavior were enacted in the Jamestown Colony in 1619 by the first General Assembly of Virginia. Among the 70 laws passed by the assembly was a mandate requiring attendance by all colonists at both morning and afternoon worship services on Sundays. The laws adopted that year also included provisions addressing idleness, gambling, drunkenness, and excessive apparel. Similar laws aimed at keeping the Sabbath holy and regulating morals were soon adopted throughout the colonies.

The first known example of the phrase "blue laws" in print was in the March 3, 1755, edition of the New-York Mercury, in which the writer imagines a future newspaper praising the revival of "our [Connecticut's] old Blue Laws". In his 1781 book General History of Connecticut, the Reverend Samuel Peters (1735–1826) used the phrase to describe numerous laws adopted by 17th-century Puritans that prohibited various activities on Sunday, recreational as well as commercial. Beyond that, Peters' book is regarded as an unreliable account of the laws and probably was written to satirize their puritanical nature.

While the historical roots of Sunday trade laws in the United States are generally known, the origin of the term "blue laws" remains a mystery. According to a Time magazine editorial in 1961, the year the Supreme Court heard four cases on the issue, the color blue came to be associated with colonial laws in opposition to the red emblem of British royalty. Other explanations have been offered. One of the most widely circulated is that early blue laws adopted in Connecticut were printed on blue paper. However, no copies have been found that would support this claim and it is not deemed credible. A more plausible explanation, one that is gaining general acceptance, is that the laws adopted by Puritans were aimed at enforcing morality and thus were "blue-nosed", though the term "blue" may have been used in the vernacular of the times as a synonym for puritanism itself, in effect, overly strict.

As Protestant moral reformers organized the Sabbath reform in 19th-century America, calls for the enactment and enforcement of stricter Sunday laws developed. Numerous Americans were arrested for working, keeping an open shop, drinking alcohol, traveling, and engaging in recreational activities on Sundays. Erwin Fahlbusch and Geoffrey William Bromiley write that throughout their existence, organizations advocating first-day Sabbatarianism, such as the Lord's Day Alliance in North America and the Lord's Day Observance Society in the British Isles, were supported by labor unions in lobbying "to prevent secular and commercial interests from hampering freedom of worship and from exploiting workers".

In Canada, the Ligue du Dimanche, a Roman Catholic Sunday league, supported the Lord's Day Act in 1923 and promoted first-day Sabbatarian legislation. Beginning in the 1840s, workers, Jews, Seventh Day Baptists, freethinkers, and other groups began to organize opposition. Throughout the century, Sunday laws fueled church–state controversy, and as an issue that contributed to the emergence of modern American minority-rights politics. On the other hand, the more recent Dies Domini, written by Pope John Paul II in 1998, advocates Sunday legislation in that it protects civil servants and workers; the North Dakota Catholic Conference in 2011 likewise maintained that blue laws, in accordance with the Compendium of the Social Doctrine of the Church, "ensure that, for reasons of economic productivity, citizens are not denied time for rest and divine worship". Similarly, Chief Justice Earl Warren, while recognizing the partial religious origin of blue laws, acknowledged the "secular purpose they served by providing a benefit to workers at the same time that they enhanced labor productivity".

== Laws by jurisdiction ==
=== Europe ===
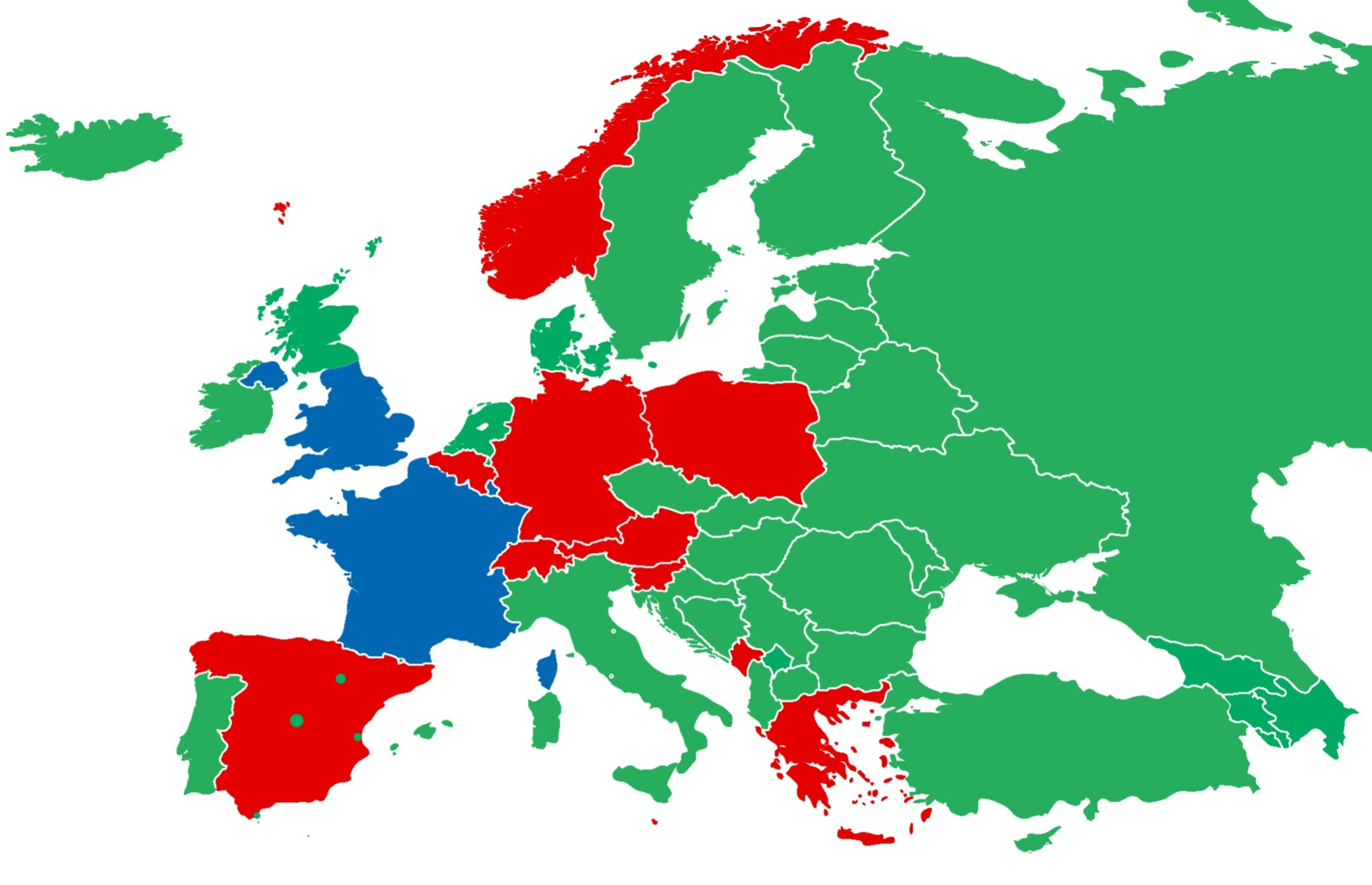
A map of Europe providing an overview of Sunday shopping laws in each country: Green: Large supermarkets and shopping centers are generally open on Sundays. Blue: Large supermarkets are allowed to be open for no more than 6 hours on Sundays. Red: Large supermarkets are generally closed on Sundays.

==== Germany ====
The Ladenschlussgesetz ("shop closing law") on Sundays and public holidays have been in effect since 1956.

==== Denmark ====
In Denmark the closing laws restricting retail trade on Sundays were effectively abolished on October 1, 2012. Retail trade is only restricted on public holidays (New Year's Day, Maundy Thursday, Good Friday, Easter Sunday, Easter Monday, Day of Prayer, Ascension Day, Whit Sunday, Whit Monday, Christmas Day and Boxing Day) and on Constitution Day, Christmas Eve and New Year's Eve (on New Year's Eve from 3 pm only). On these days almost all shops will remain closed. Exempt are bakeries, DIYs, garden centres, gas stations and smaller supermarkets.

==== England and Wales ====
===== Before 1994 =====
Prior to 1994, trading laws forbade sale of certain products on a Sunday; the distinction between those that could and could not be sold was increasingly seen as arbitrary, and the laws were inadequately enforced and widely flouted. For example, some supermarkets would treat the relatively modest fines arising as a business cost and open nonetheless.

===== Since 1994 =====
The Sunday Trading Act 1994 relaxed restrictions on Sunday trading. This produced vocal opposition from bodies such as the Keep Sunday Special campaign, and the Lord's Day Observance Society: on religious grounds, on the grounds that it would increase consumerism, and that it would reduce shop assistants' weekend leisure time.

The legislation permits large shops (those with a relevant floor area in excess of 280 square metres; 3000 sq. ft.) to open for up to six hours on Sunday. Small shops, those with an area of below 280 square metres (3000 sq. ft.), are free to set their own Sunday trading times. Some large shops, such as off-licences, service stations and garages, are exempt from the restrictions.

Some very large shops (e.g. department stores) open for longer than six hours on a Sunday by allowing customers in to browse 30 minutes prior to allowing them to make a purchase, since the six-hour restriction only applies to time during which the shop may make sales.

Christmas Day and Easter Sunday are non-trading days. This applies even to garden centres, which earlier had been trading over Easter, but not to small shops (those with an area of below 280 square metres; 3000 sq. ft.).

==== Netherlands ====
Prior to 1996, shops were generally closed on Sundays. A new law (store time law) regarding opening times changed that and leaves that decision mostly up to local municipalities. This law was changed several times since.

The Zondagswet ("Sunday law (in the Netherlands)"), a law on Sabbath desecration, is mainly to ensure that church services remain undisturbed on Sundays and Christian holidays. It forbids public festivities on a Sunday before 13:00, as well as making noise that carries farther than 200 metres (220 yd), but activities that are unlikely to disturb church services are exempt.

==== Northern Ireland ====
Prior to 2008, no football was permitted to be played on Sundays by clubs affiliated to the Irish Football Association in Northern Ireland.

Shops with a floor area of over 280 square metres (3,000 sq ft) may only open from 1 to 6pm on Sundays.

In Belfast, public playgrounds were closed on Sundays until 1965. Swings in public parks were tied up and padlocked to prevent their use. Similar laws formerly applied to cinemas, pubs and parks.

==== Poland ====
Since 2007, blue laws were enacted and resulted in stores closing on the 13 state holidays in Poland – these are both religious and secular days of rest. In 2014, an initiative by the Law and Justice party failed to pass the reading in the Sejm to ban trading on Sundays and state holidays. However, since 2018, the ruling government and the President of Poland has signed a law that restricts store trading from March 1, 2018, to the first and last Sunday of the month, Palm Sunday, the 3rd and 4th Advent Sundays, as well as trading until 14.00 for Easter Saturday and Christmas Eve.

In 2019, the restriction was extended, and trading was permitted solely on the last Sunday of the month, as well as Palm Sunday, the 3rd and 4th Advent Sundays, as well as trading until 14.00 for Easter Saturday and Christmas Eve. From 2020, stores may only be open on seven Sundays in the year: Palm Sunday, the 3rd and 4th Advent Sundays, the last Sunday of January, April, June and August as well as trading until 14.00 for Easter Saturday and Christmas Eve. As a result of restrictions in connection with the COVID-19 pandemic, the 2nd Advent Sunday was later added as a shopping day.

=== North America ===
==== Canada ====
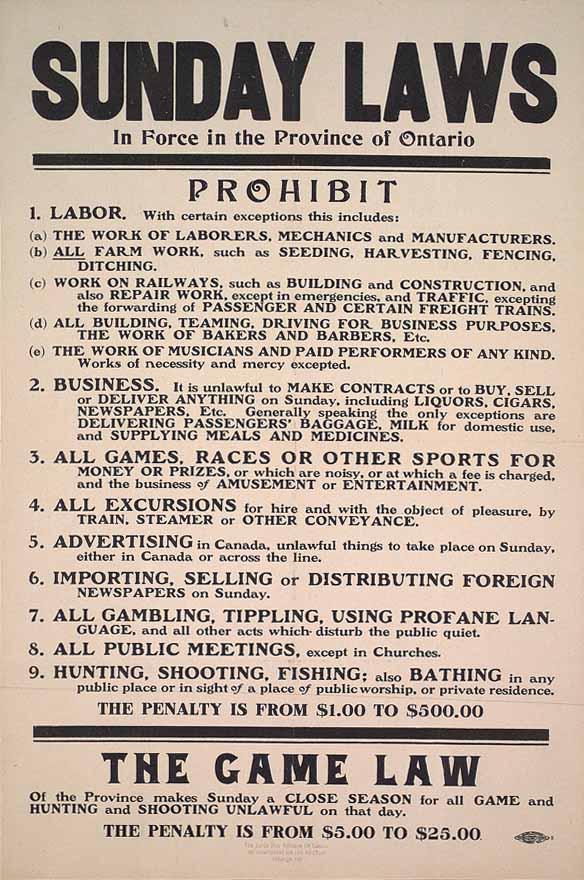
Sunday laws in Ontario, 1911

The Lord's Day Act, which since 1906 had prohibited business transactions from taking place on Sundays, was declared unconstitutional in the 1985 case R. v. Big M Drug Mart Ltd. Calgary police officers witnessed several transactions at the Big M Drug Mart, all of which occurred on a Sunday. Big M was charged with a violation of the Lord's Day Act. A provincial court ruled that the Lord's Day Act was unconstitutional, but the Crown proceeded to appeal all the way to the Supreme Court of Canada. In a unanimous 6–0 decision, the Lord's Day Act was ruled an infringement of the freedom of conscience and religion defined in section 2(a) of the Charter of Rights and Freedoms.

A Toronto referendum in 1950 allowed only team sports to be played professionally on Sunday. Theatre performances, movie screenings, and horse racing were not permitted until the 1960s.

The Supreme Court later concluded, in R. v. Edwards Books and Art Ltd. [1986] (2 S.C.R. 713), that Ontario's Retail Business Holiday Act, which required some Sunday closings, did not violate the Charter because it did not have a religious purpose. Nonetheless, as of today, virtually all provincial Sunday closing laws have ceased to exist. Some were struck down by provincial courts, but most were simply abrogated, often due to competitive reasons where out-of-province or foreign merchants were open.

==== United States ====
In the United States, judges have defended blue laws "in terms of their secular benefit to workers", holding that "the laws were essential to social well-being". In 1896, Supreme Court Justice Stephen Johnson Field, opined with regard to Sunday blue laws:

Its requirement is a cessation from labor. In its enactment, the legislature has given the sanction of law to a rule of conduct, which the entire civilized world recognizes as essential to the physical and moral well-being of society. Upon no subject is there such a concurrence of opinion, among philosophers, moralists and statesmen of all nations, as on the necessity of periodical cessation from labor. One day in seven is the rule, founded in experience and sustained by science. ... The prohibition of secular business on Sunday is advocated on the ground that by it the general welfare is advanced, labor protected, and the moral and physical well-being of society promoted.

— Hennington v. Georgia, 163 U.S. 299 (1896)

Many states prohibit selling alcohol for on and off-premises sales in one form or another on Sundays at some restricted time, under the idea that people should be in church on Sunday morning, or at least not drinking.

Many blue laws in the United States restrict the purchase of particular items on Sundays; some of these laws restrict the ability to buy cars, groceries, office supplies, and housewares, among other things. Although most of these laws have been relaxed or repealed in most states, they are still enforced in some states.

In Texas, for example, blue laws prohibited selling housewares such as pots, pans, and washing machines on Sunday until 1985. In Colorado, Illinois, Indiana, Iowa, Louisiana, Maine, Minnesota, Missouri, Oklahoma, New Jersey, North Dakota, Pennsylvania, and Wisconsin, car dealerships continue to operate under blue-law prohibitions in which an automobile may not be purchased or traded on a Sunday. Maryland permits Sunday automobile sales only in the counties of Charles, Prince George's, Montgomery, and Howard; similarly, Michigan restricts Sunday sales to only those counties with a population of less than 130,000. Texas and Utah prohibit car dealerships from operating over consecutive weekend days. In some cases, these laws were created or retained with the support of those whom they affected, to allow them a day off each week without fear of their competitors still being open.

Blue laws may also prohibit retail activity on days other than Sunday. In Massachusetts, Rhode Island, and Maine, for example, blue laws prohibit most retail stores, including grocery stores, from opening on Thanksgiving and Christmas.

Research regarding the effect of the repeal of blue laws has been conducted, with Professor Elesha Coffman of Baylor University writing for Christianity Today:

Regarding culture, the impact of vanishing blue laws could be larger. A study in New Mexico in 2006 found a sharp increase in drunken driving on Sundays after that state dropped its Sunday ban on packaged alcohol sales. A broader study published by MIT and Notre Dame economists in 2008 found that the repeal of blue laws led to decreased church attendance, decreased donations to churches, and increased alcohol and drug use among religious individuals. These wide-ranging effects cannot easily be pinpointed to specific causes, but one of the latter study's authors, Daniel Hungerman, suggested to Christianity Today that blue laws might have been fulfilling their original intent, to keep people pious.

===== Court cases =====
Beginning in the mid-19th century, religious and ethno-cultural minorities arrested for violating state and local blue laws appealed their convictions to state supreme courts. In Specht v. Commonwealth (Pa. 1848), for example, German Seventh Day Baptists in Pennsylvania employed attorney Thaddeus Stevens to challenge the constitutionality of Pennsylvania's Sunday law. As in cases in other states, litigants pointed to the provisions of state constitutions protecting religious liberty and maintained that Sunday laws were a blatant violation. Though typically unsuccessful (most state supreme courts upheld the constitutionality of Sunday laws), these constitutional challenges helped set a pattern by which subsequent minorities would seek to protect religious freedom and minority rights.

The Supreme Court of the United States held in its landmark case, McGowan v. Maryland (1961), that Maryland's blue laws violated neither the Free Exercise Clause nor the Establishment Clause of the First Amendment to the United States Constitution. It approved the state's blue law restricting commercial activities on Sunday, noting that while such laws originated to encourage attendance at Christian churches, the contemporary Maryland laws were intended to serve "to provide a uniform day of rest for all citizens" on a secular basis and to promote the secular values of "health, safety, recreation, and general well-being" through a common day of rest. That this day coincides with Christian Sabbath is not a bar to the state's secular goals; it neither reduces its effectiveness for secular purposes nor prevents adherents of other religions from observing their own holy days.

McGowan was but one of four Sunday closing cases decided together by the Court in May 1961. In Gallagher v. Crown Kosher Super Market of Mass., Inc., the Court ruled against a Kosher deli that closed on Saturday but was open on Sunday. The other two cases were Braunfeld v. Brown, and Two Guys from Harrison-Allentown, Inc. v. McGinley. Chief Justice Earl Warren declared that "the State seeks to set one day apart from all others as a day of rest, repose, recreation and tranquility--a day which all members of the family and community have the opportunity to spend and enjoy together, a day on which there exists relative quiet and disassociation from the everyday intensity of commercial activities, a day on which people may visit friends and relatives who are not available during working days".

In March 2006, Texas judges upheld the state blue law that requires car dealerships to close either Saturday or Sunday each weekend.

=== Oceania ===
==== Cook Islands and Niue ====
Blue laws also exist in the Polynesian islands of Cook Islands and Niue. In the Cook Islands, these were the first written legislation, enacted by the London Missionary Society in 1827, with the consent of the ariki (chiefs). Laws in Niue ban certain activities on Sunday, reflecting the country's history of observing the Christian Sabbath tradition.

==== Tonga ====
In the Kingdom of Tonga, the Vavaʻu Code (1839) was a form of blue law inspired by the teachings of Methodist missionaries. With the inauguration of the Tongan Constitution on June 4, 1875, the sixth clause stipulates: "The Sabbath Day shall be kept holy in Tonga and no person shall practise his trade or profession or conduct any commercial undertaking on the Sabbath Day except according to law; and any agreement made or witnessed on that day shall be null and void and of no legal effect."

== See also ==
- Desuetude
- Dry county
- Neo-prohibitionism
- Raines law
- Religious law
- Sunday shopping

== Bibliography ==
- Algeo, Matthew (2006). Last Team Standing. Philadelphia: Da Capo Press. ISBN 978-0-306-81472-3
- Ruck, Rob; with Patterson, Maggie Jones and Weber, Michael P. (2010). Rooney: A Sporting Life. Lincoln, Neb.: University of Nebraska Press. ISBN 978-0-8032-2283-0
- Safire, William. (2008) Safire's Political Dictionary, (New York: Oxford UP, 2008). p. 66 online
- Sarna, Jonathan D. and Dalin, David G. (1997). Religion and State in the American Jewish Experience. Notre Dame, Indiana: University of Notre Dame Press. ISBN 978-0-2680-1654-8
- Volk, Kyle G. (2014). Minorities and the Making of American Democracy. New York: Oxford University Press. ISBN 019937192X.
- Westcott, Rich (2001). A Century of Philadelphia Sports. Philadelphia: Temple University Press. ISBN 978-1-56639-861-9
