= Lord's Day Act (Canada) =

Blue law in Canada

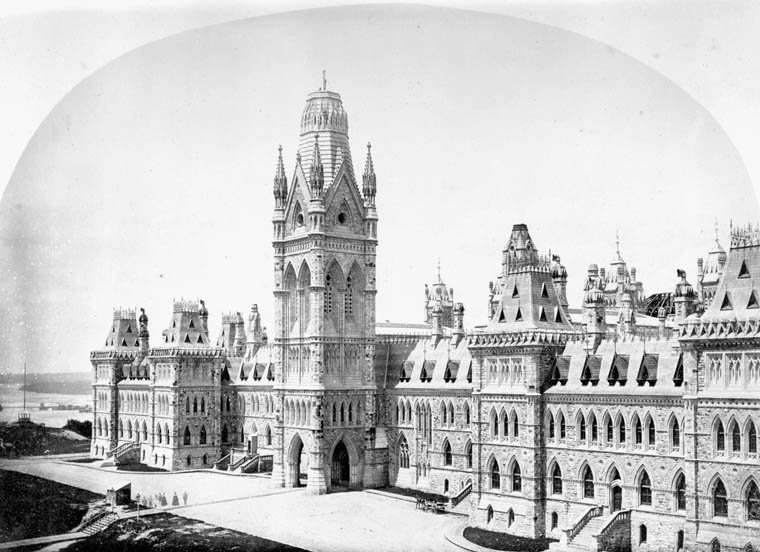

Parliament of Canada
- Long title: An Act respecting the Lord's Day
- Enacted by: Parliament of Canada
- Assented to: July 13, 1906
- Commenced: March 1, 1907

The Lord's Day Act was a federal law to regulate and prohibit activities on Sundays in Canada. It was in force from 1907 until 1985, when it was found to be unconstitutional by the Supreme Court of Canada. Campaigned for by members of the Presbyterian Church in Canada, it was passed in 1906. Notably, the Act allowed that it would not supersede any provincial or municipal laws made for the same purpose.

== Description ==
The Act prohibited any person "to sell or offer for sale or purchase any goods, chattels or other personal property, or real estate, or to carry on or transact any business of his ordinary calling, or in connection with such calling, or for gain to do, or employ any other person to do, on that day any work, business or labour."

Its main prohibitions applied to retail activities, as it allowed:

- work necessary for divine worship;
- "work for the relief of sickness and suffering", including the sale of drugs and medicines;
- care of furnaces, both for industrial and residential purposes;
- telegraph and telephone services;
- supply of electricity, including light, heat, cold air, water and gas;
- travel by train or vessels, except that train crews could not do train yard work between 6 a.m and 4 p.m.;
- loading and unloading of goods on trains and vessels, although such activities had to be done before 7 a.m. or after 8 p.m.;
- the care of milk, cheese and live animals;
- "necessary work in the preparation of the regular Monday edition of a daily newspaper" after 6 p.m.;
- the operation of toll bridges, drawbridges and ferries;
- the hiring of horses and carriages;
- conveyance of mail;
- delivery of milk;
- work of domestic servants;
- operation of street railways;
- work for the Government;
- "any unavoidable work" by fishermen after 6 p.m.;
- any freight work by railway;

Performances, games and contests other than in a church for which admission was charged were prohibited. Performances included "any game, match, sport, contest, exhibition or entertainment." "Travel for "amusement or pleasure" for a fee was also prohibited. It was also illegal to advertise anything which contravened the Act, whether it occurred in Canada or outside. The shooting of guns for personal gain, or that disturbed worship was also disallowed. The import of Sunday newspapers from outside the country was also illegal.

The initial penalty for offences under the Act was "not less than one dollar and not exceeding forty dollars, plus the cost of prosecution." An employer who "authorizes or directs anything to be done in contravention of this Act" could be charged an additional fine of CA$20 to $100. Corporations which "authorizes, directs or permits its employees to carry on any part of the business done by such corporation" could be fined an additional fine of between $50 and $250 on first offence, and $100 to $500 on subsequent offences.

Those working on Sunday in industry or transportation could substitute another consecutive 24 hours in the next six days. If an offence was committed, a person, employer or corporation had to be charged within 60 days of the offence.

In an important clause, the federal Act would not supersede any Act passed by a province or municipality in Canada. There were already laws on the books regarding Sundays. For example, the province of Ontario already had a blue law, the Act to prevent the Profanation of the Lord's Day. It similarly prohibited business and other activities, such as drinking, fishing, hunting and sports, on Sundays.

== History ==
The Act was the product of a group called the "Lord's Day Alliance." Formed in 1888, it was spearheaded by the Presbyterian church, to stop the secularization of Sundays. The group campaigned for a federal law to curtail many activities. This reached the floor of the Parliament of Canada in 1906. It passed, but not without extensive debate. Notably, Quebec politician and businessman Henri Bourassa argued that it violated provincial rights. He also ridiculed the many exceptions. The law was set to take effect the following year in March 1907 and this gave the Government of Quebec time to write its own Sunday laws.

Blue laws pre-existing to the federal Act did not apply to Indigenous persons. The federal act now applied and Ontario and the federal Indian Department prosecuted those members of the Six Nations and Ahkwesáhsne which held lacrosse games on Sundays in 1924. The federal Indian Department suspended the hereditary council of the Six Nations and replaced it with an elected council partly due to the dispute over the lacrosse games after the Council appealed to the League of Nations over its sovereignty. The Haudenosaunee had held the games since 1916 on its land and allowed non-Indigenous peoples to pay admission and watch.

=== Charter challenge and invalidation ===
When Canada repatriated its Constitution, it added the Canadian Charter of Rights and Freedoms. In Section 2, the Charter guarantees freedom of religion. As a law based on the beliefs and practices of one religion, it could be challenged under the Charter. This took place in 1985.

In 1982, the Calgary store Big M Drug Mart was charged with unlawfully carrying on the sale of goods on a Sunday contrary to the Act. At trial the store was acquitted, and an appeal was dismissed by the Alberta Court of Appeal. The verdict was appealed to the Supreme Court of Canada in the case R v Big M Drug Mart Ltd. The constitutional question put before the Court was whether the Act infringed the right to freedom of conscience and religion, if so, whether it is justified under section 1 of the Charter, and whether the Act was intra vires ("within") Parliament's criminal power under section 91(27) of the Constitution Act, 1867.

The Supreme Court ruled that the statute was an unconstitutional violation of section 2 of the Charter of Rights and Freedoms, deciding that there was no true secular basis for the legislation and its only purpose was, in effect, to establish a state religious-based requirement, and was therefore invalid. The drug store's victory was made possible by section 52 of the Constitution Act, 1982, which provides that unconstitutional laws can be found invalid, as opposed to section 24 of the Charter, which is for those whose rights are violated. In as much as a corporation is not a natural person, it cannot have a religion and therefore the corporation's religious freedom was not violated.
