= McGowan v. Maryland =

- Supreme Court of the United States

Argued December 8, 1960 Decided May 29, 1961
- Full case name: Margaret M. McGowan, et al. v. State of Maryland
- Citations: 366 U.S. 420 (more) 81 S. Ct. 1101; 6 L. Ed. 2d 393; 1961 U.S. LEXIS 2008

Case history
- Prior: Conviction upheld, McGowan v. State, 220 Md. 117, 151 A.2d 156 (1959); probable jurisdiction noted, 362 U.S. 959 (1960).

Holding
- Laws proscribing or limiting Sunday trading are not necessarily unconstitutional.

Court membership
- Chief Justice Earl Warren Associate Justices Hugo Black · Felix Frankfurter; William O. Douglas · Tom C. Clark; John M. Harlan II · William J. Brennan Jr. Charles E. Whittaker · Potter Stewart

Case opinions
- Majority: Warren, joined by Black, Clark, Brennan, Whittaker, Stewart
- Concurrence: Frankfurter, joined by Harlan
- Dissent: Douglas

Laws applied
- Md. Ann. Code, Art. 27, § 521; 1st and 14th Amendments

McGowan v. Maryland, 366 U.S. 420 (1961), was a United States Supreme Court case that affirmed the Maryland State Supreme Court's decision that the state's Sunday closing laws did not have a religious purpose to aid religion and that the secular purpose of the legislation to set aside a day of rest and recreation did not violate the Establishment Clause.

== Background ==
A large discount store in Anne Arundel County, Maryland was fined for selling goods on a Sunday, in violation of a local blue law. The Court rejected an establishment clause challenge to laws saying that most large-scale commercial enterprises remain closed on Sundays. The Court's review of the history demonstrated that Sunday closing laws were originally efforts to promote church attendance. "But, despite the strongly religious origin of these laws, non religious arguments for Sunday closing began to be heard more distinctly."

The Court said that the Constitution does not ban federal or state regulation of conduct whose reason or effect merely happens to coincide with the tenets of some or all religions. It concluded that, as currently written and administered, most Sunday closing laws are of a secular rather than religious character. They provide a uniform day of rest for all citizens. To say that the State cannot prescribe Sunday as a day of rest for these purposes solely because centuries ago such laws had their genesis in religion would give a constitutional interpretation of hostility to the public welfare rather than one of mere separation of church and state.

== Decision ==
The Court held that Maryland's laws did not violate the First Amendment.

Writing for the Court, Chief Justice Warren explained that the appellants did not have standing for their free exercise claim because they claimed only economic injury and their religious beliefs were not a matter of record.

Since the general rule is that "a litigant may only assert his own constitutional rights or immunities," United States v. Raines, 362 U.S. 17, 22. we hold that appellants have no standing to raise this contention."

The Court found that appellants did have standing as taxpayers for their Establishment claim based on Everson v. Board of Education:

Appellants here concededly have suffered direct economic injury, allegedly due to the imposition on them of the Christian religion. We find that, in these circumstances, these appellants have standing to complain that the statutes are laws respecting an establishment of religion.

The Court also held that the law did not violate the Fourteenth Amendment. Chief Justice Warren again:

...the Court has [previously] held that the Fourteenth Amendment permits the States a wide scope of discretion in enacting laws which affect some groups of citizens differently than others. The constitutional safeguard is offended only if the classification rests on grounds wholly irrelevant to the achievement of the State's objective. State legislatures are presumed to have acted within their constitutional power [even when], in practice, their laws result in some inequality.

In reaching their conclusion, the Court also examined the wider question of whether laws proscribing or limiting Sunday trading were constitutional. They held that such laws did not violate the division between church and state, because - no matter the historical roots of such laws - the laws existed as constituted in order to fulfill a secular objective. In other words, even if Sunday trading laws were originally intended to facilitate and encourage church attendance in the colonial United States, the laws as presently constituted were intended to improve the "health, safety, recreation, and general well-being" of citizens. The present purpose of the laws is to provide a uniform day of rest for all; the fact that this day is of particular significance for one or more religions does not bar the State from achieving its secular goals in this manner.

In a dissent, Justice Douglas argued that the Sunday closing laws were an attempt by the Protestant majority to impose its beliefs on the country. He wrote:

The Court picks and chooses language from various decisions to bolster its conclusion that these Sunday laws, in the modern setting, are "civil regulations." No matter how much is written, no matter what is said, the parentage of these laws is the Fourth Commandment, and they serve and satisfy the religious predispositions of our Christian communities. (Also:) “The First Amendment commands government to have no interest in theology or ritual; it admonishes government to be interested in allowing religious freedom to flourish — whether the result is to produce Catholics, Jews, or Protestants, or to turn the people toward the path of Buddha, or to end in a predominantly Moslem nation, or to produce in the long run atheists or agnostics. On matters of this kind government must be neutral.”

== See also ==
- Gallagher v. Crown Kosher Super Market of Massachusetts, Inc. (1961): another Sunday shopping court case
- List of United States Supreme Court cases, volume 366

== See also ==
- List of United States Supreme Court cases, volume 366
