= Shops Act =

Shops Bill or Shops Act may refer to several pieces of legislation in the United Kingdom:

- Shops Act 1911, an Act that allowed a weekly half-day holiday for shopworkers
- Shops Act 1950, an Act to regulate shop opening hours and Sunday trading
- Shops Bill 1986, an attempt to repeal the 1950 Act and legalise Sunday trading
- Sunday Trading Act 1994, an Act that legalised Sunday trading in England and Wales
- Sunday Working (Scotland) Act 2003, an Act allowing workers in Scotland the right to refuse to work on a Sunday
- Christmas Day (Trading) Act 2004, an Act making it illegal for large shops to open on Christmas Day
- Sunday Trading (London Olympic Games and Paralympic Games) Act 2012, an Act that suspended Sunday trading laws in London for eight weekends from 22 July 2012 during the Olympics and Paralympics
