= Michael Schluter =

British social entrepreneur (born 1947)

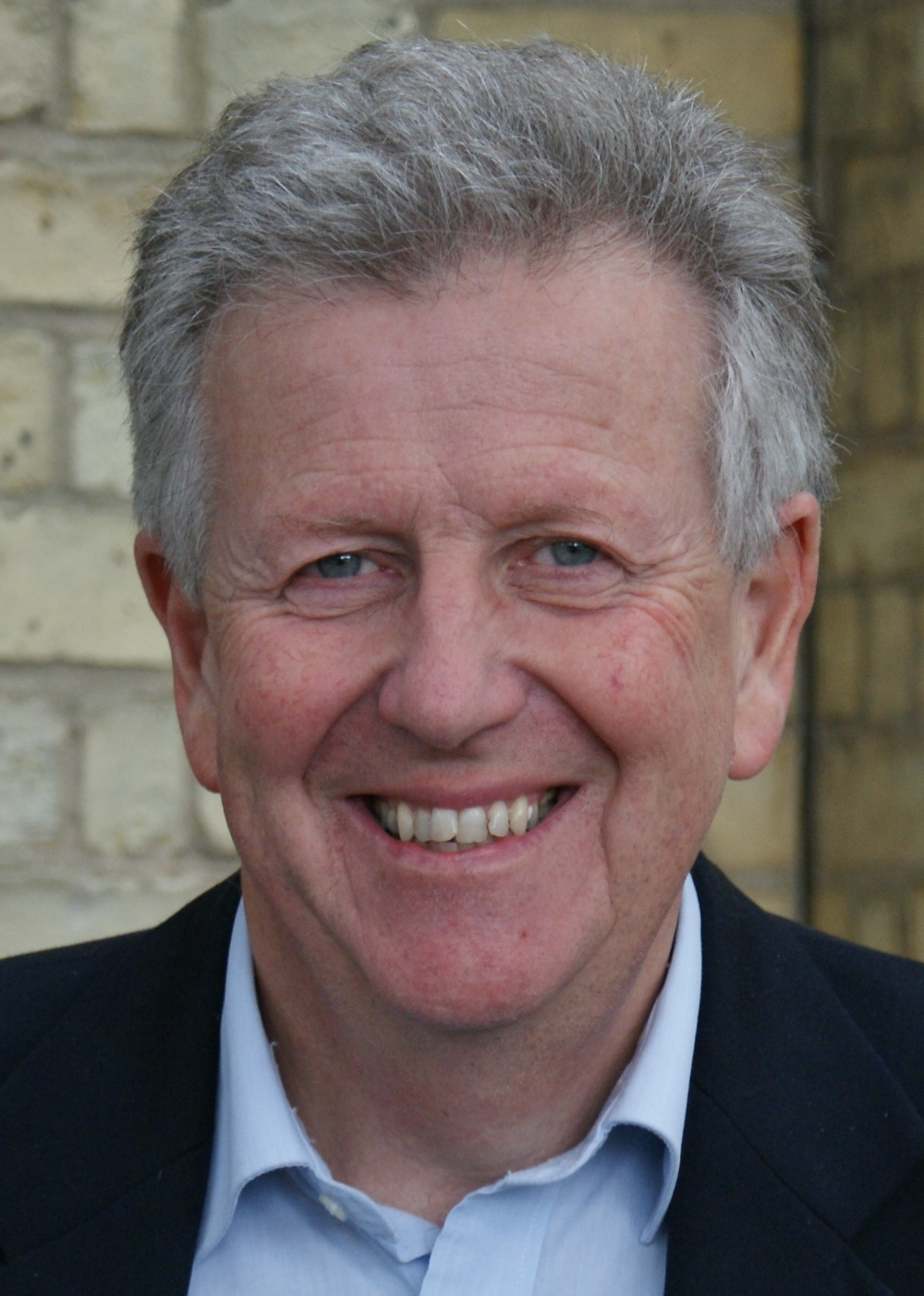
- Schluter in 2012
- Born: 1947 (age 78–79)
- Occupations: Social thinker, social entrepreneur
- Children: 3

Dr. Michael Gerald Galton Schluter CBE (born 1947) is a British social thinker and social entrepreneur who founded Britain's Relationships Foundation.

After gaining his Ph.D. from Cornell University, Schluter worked as an applied economist with the International Food Policy Research Institute (IFPRI) and the World Bank. Along with colleagues in the field, he has founded a variety of international NGOs focused on public policy, food security, and peace-building initiatives. Schluter is currently president and CEO of Relational Peacebuilding Initiatives. In recognition of his public service, he was appointed CBE by the Queen in the New Year Honours List 2009.

== Early life and education ==
Schluter graduated from Durham University in 1968 with a degree in Economics and Economic History. He completed his doctorate at Cornell University in 1973.

== Public policy ==
Schluter's approach to public policy was first articulated at book length in The R Factor (1993), co-authored with Princeton professor David Lee.

Schluter's central argument is that social, economic and political problems in society arise from a lack of prioritization of relationships – not only personal relationships, but organisational, national and international relationships. Legislative, governmental and corporate policies and organisational structures impact on the ways that people relate to one another, but this influence is often neglected in the formation of public policy.

Improving the quality of these relationships could lead to "relational restoration" according to Schluter, potentially enhancing global quality of life. This approach has been described as a critique of both capitalism and socialism, and seeks to provide an alternative framework for public policy. Its followers are sometimes called 'relationists' and, the idea is commonly referred to as relational thinking within the field of public policy.

The R Factor was received by many people as a call to action. While Schluter has co-authored other books and reports since then (e.g. The Jubilee Manifesto, The Relational Manager, Transforming Capitalism from Within, The Relational Lens, and Confederal Europe), few publications by any author in the last few decades have had such a range of impacts on individuals, on families, on organisations, and structures.

== Relational thinking ==
Schluter has founded two organizations that research relationships: relationships foundation and relational research. Several practical initiatives based on the relational approach have developed out of this work. These include credit action to help tackle the effects of consumer debt; Allia, which tackles unemployment and funding social enterprise by encouraging the use of capital to achieve social outcomes; and Relational Schools, which seeks to reform the culture and values in schools. Another initiative is the Marriage Foundation, which promotes long-term committed relationships through the institution of marriage.

The R Factor sets out the five essential dimensions of every relationship (personal, organisational or international). Those dimensions are collectively referred to as the relational proximity framework. Schluter recognised that measurement of quality of relationships was crucial if relational assessment was to be used in public decision making. In an organisational context, any relationship measurement must be two-sided, because no relationship is one-sided. The measurement process and tools are referred to as "relational analytics". Given the tens of thousands of measurements already carried out across schools, companies, the health sector, prisons, elderly care, and the non-profit sector, these relational analytics tools can be statistically validated.

== International peace work ==
In 1987, Schluter and colleagues initiated a peace process under the name Newick Park Initiative (NPI) in South Africa, which held low-profile conferences between 1987 and 1997, bringing together the leaders of the African National Congress (ANC) and the white political leadership to discuss key issues and ease the path to a political settlement. NPI's director facilitated Inkatha joining the South African election just three weeks before the first free elections in 1994.

The work in South Africa led to a peace initiative in Rwanda after the genocide, followed by a peace process between North and South Sudan. These initiatives were followed by the establishment in 2005 of Concordis International, for regional peace initiatives working primarily in Africa. In 2016, Schluter helped to establish Relational Peacebuilding Initiatives (RPI) based in Geneva to heal relationships in situations of national conflict. RPI is currently involved with peacebuilding initiatives in the Korean peninsula, and has published a book on how to bring together capitalist and socialist societies to bring about peace and reunification.

== Jubilee centre and keep Sunday special campaign ==
In 1983 Schluter helped to establish the Jubilee Centre to explore the shared heritage of Jewish and Christian understanding of the Torah as a part of the Hebrew/Old Testament scriptures. This led to the publication of the 'R' Factor in 1993. The intellectual work initiated by 'R' Factor continues in research undertaken by the Jubilee Centre, and through the Cambridge Papers. The Jubilee Centre connects what is now referred to as Relational Thinking to the life of churches and other religious institutions.

In 1985, the Jubilee Centre brought together a coalition of retailers, trade unions and church-related organizations to fight prime minister Thatcher's bill to deregulate Sunday trading. This recognised that the Sabbath protects community and family relationships, because time is an essential precondition to build and maintain any relationship. The Keep Sunday Special campaign overturned a large government majority. In 1994, the government passed a bill which allows large shops to open for six hours on Sunday while small shops can open when they like; this remains the law to this day. Schluter has continued to speak out against Sunday Trading, arguing that a new law needs to be brought in to give everyone a shared day off and to ensure parents can spend time with their children. Schluter argued that Sunday shopping in the United States was ''a fairly major contributing factor damaging to family life and stability'' and said he was fighting the battle against it here ''on grounds of Christian principle.''

== Books (authored and co-authored) ==
- The "R" Factor (Hodder & Stoughton, 1993)
- The Jubilee Manifesto (IVP, 2005)
- The Relational Manager (Lion Hudson, 2009)
- Transforming Capitalism from Within (2011)
- After Capitalism (2013)
- The Relational Lens (CUP, 2017)
- Confederal Europe Parts 1 and 2 (Sallux and Jubilee Centre, 2018 and 2019)
- Relational Rights (Relational Research, 2021)
- Is Corporate Capitalism the best we've got to offer? (Relational Research, 2022)
- No Other Way to Peace in Korea? A practical path to reunification (Relational Peacebuilding Initiatives, 2022)
