= 2003 Slovenian Sunday shopping referendum =

21 September 2003
- Are you in favor of the bill amending the Trade Act (EPA 750-III) specifying that shops for essential life items are open for a maximum of 10 Sundays a year, with the exception of service stations, shops in hospitals, hotels, at airports, border crossings and railway and bus stations, with a limited area, which can be opened without restrictions?

Results
Choice	Votes	%
Yes	256,461	57.99%
No	185,773	42.01%
Valid votes	442,234	99.20%
Invalid or blank votes	3,554	0.80%
Total votes	445,788	100.00%
Registered voters/turnout	1,618,978	27.54%

A referendum on Sunday shopping was held in Slovenia on 21 September 2003. Voters were asked whether they approved of limiting shops to opening on ten Sundays a year. The proposal was approved by 58% of voters, although voter turnout was only 27.5%.

== Results ==
Choice	Votes	%
For	256,461	58.0
Against	185,773	42.0
Invalid/blank votes	3,554	–
Total	445,788	100
Registered voters/turnout	1,618,964	27.5
Source: Nohlen & Stöver
