= 24/7 service =

Available 24 hours a day, seven days a week

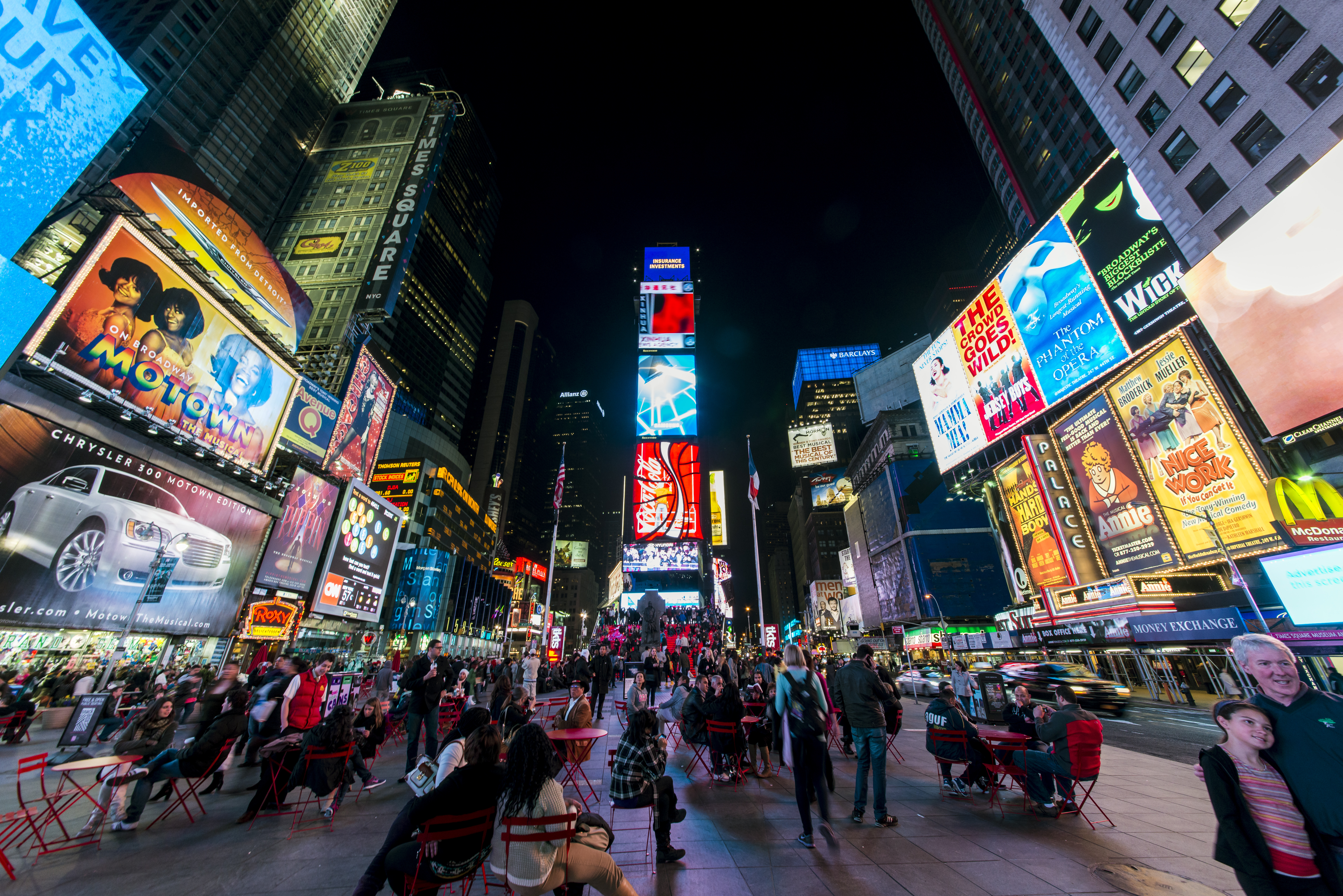
Businesses in Times Square, New York City, offer 24/7 service.

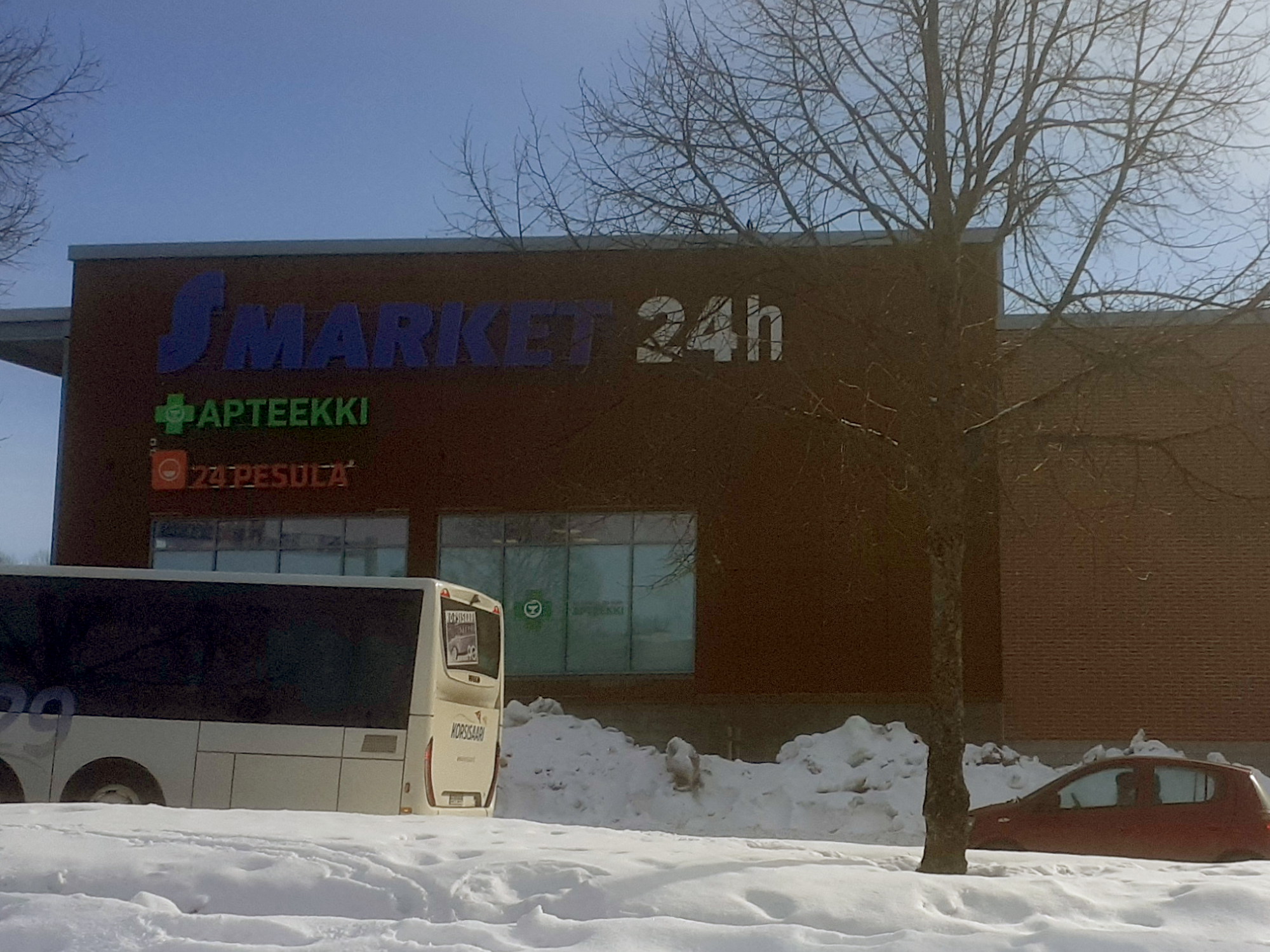
S-Market 24/7 grocery store in Klaukkala, Finland, 2022

In commerce and industry, 24/7 or 24-7 service (usually pronounced "twenty-four seven") is service that is available at any time of day, 24 hours, and every day of the week, 7 days. An alternate orthography is 24×7 (usually pronounced "twenty-four by seven"). Less commonly used are the terms 24/7/52 (adding "52 weeks") and 24/7/365 (adding "365 days") make it clear that service is available every day of the year including the one extra day on leap years.

Synonyms include around-the-clock service (with/without hyphens) and all day every day, especially in British English, and nonstop service, but the latter can also refer to other things, such as public transport services which go between two stations without stopping.

The Oxford English Dictionary (OED) defines the term as "twenty-four hours a day, seven days a week; constantly". It lists its first reference to 24/7 to be from a 1983 story in the US magazine Sports Illustrated in which Louisiana State University basketball player Jerry Reynolds describes his jump shot in just such a way: 24–7–365.

24/7 service is employed in many settings including commercial businesses, emergency services, transport, utilities, certain industrial processes, and some human services.

== Examples ==
=== Commercial business ===
24/7 service might be offered by a supermarket, convenience store, ATM, automated online assistant, filling station, restaurant, concierge services or a staffed datacenter, or a staffing company that specializes in providing nurses since often nurses cover shifts 24/7 at hospital which are open 24/7. 24/7 services may also include taxicabs, security services, and in densely populated urban areas, construction crews.

=== Emergency services and transport ===
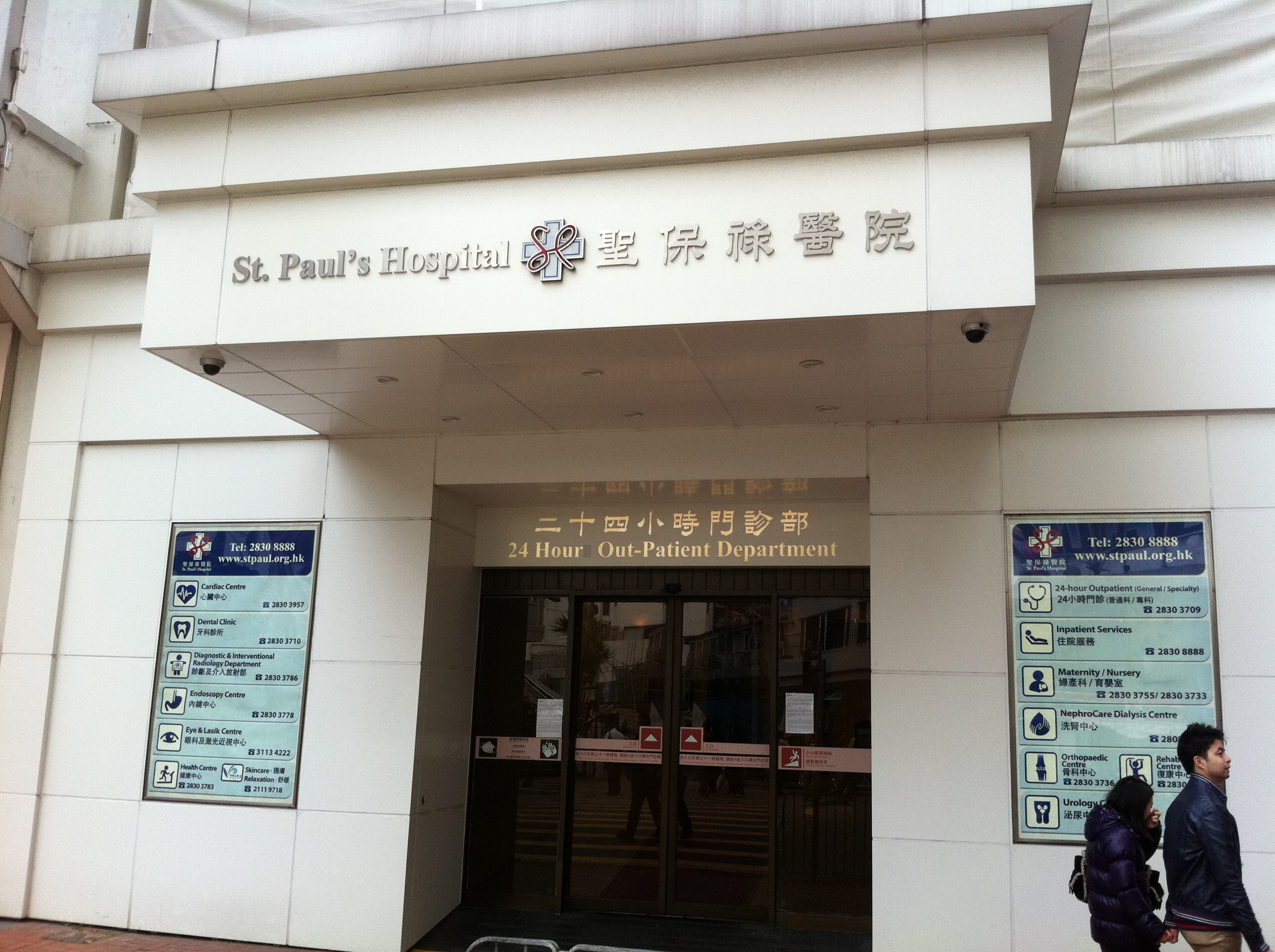
Hospital in Hong Kong with 24-hour clinics

Public 24/7 services often include those provided by emergency medical providers, police, fire and emergency telephone numbers, such as 9-1-1 in North America.

Transport services like airports, airlines, and ferry services, and in some cases trains and buses, may provide 24-hour service. Examples of public transport services operating 24/7 include the New York City Subway, Staten Island Railway, PATH, PATCO, the Copenhagen Metro, and the Red Line and Blue Line of the Chicago "L". Many networks run a reduced night service schedule.

=== Industrial and utility services ===
Industrial and manufacturing facilities—especially those that operate near or at capacity, or which depend upon processes (such as production lines) that are costly to suspend—often provide 24/7 services. Similarly, utilities generally must provide multiple 24/7 services. For instance, an electricity provider will handle outage reports 24/7 and dispatch emergency repair technicians 24/7, in addition to monitoring electrical infrastructure and producing electricity at all times. The same applies to telecommunications and internet service providers.

=== Nonprofit and charity services ===
Many crisis centers and crisis hotlines provide 24/7 services.

== Methods ==
=== Continuous operations ===
Many 24/7 services operate continuously at all times with complete shift staff.

=== Geographical alternation ===
24/7 services that can utilize virtual offices, such as call centers, may employ daytime agents in alternating time zones.

== Service disruption ==
In some cases, 24/7 services may be temporarily unavailable under certain circumstances. Such scenarios may include scheduled maintenance, upgrades or renovation, emergency repair, and injunction. 24/7 services which depend upon the physical presence of employees at a given location may also be interrupted when a minimum number of employees cannot be present due to scenarios such as extreme weather, death threats, natural disasters, or mandatory evacuation.

Some 24/7 services close during major holidays.

=== Redundancy and hardening ===
24/7 services often employ complex schemes that ensure their resistance to potential disruption, resilience in the event of disruption, and minimum standards of overall reliability.

Critical infrastructure may be supported by failover systems, electric generators, and satellite communications. In the event of catastrophic disaster, some 24/7 services prepare entirely redundant, parallel infrastructures, often in other geographic regions.

=== Long-term post-COVID disruption ===
At the beginning of the COVID-19 pandemic in 2020, many stores ended 24/7 operations, ostensibly on a temporary basis, in order to clean and sanitize their establishments. After the widespread availability of vaccines, however, many such businesses have not returned to 24-hour service for a variety of reasons. Some proprietors in the United States originally blamed pandemic unemployment benefits for a lack of workers, yet employers still struggled to resume pre-pandemic hours after these programs ended, citing continued staff shortages and demands for better working conditions among jobseekers. Many businesses that were once broadly open for 24/7 operations only resumed such service across some of their establishments or have ended 24/7 operations altogether, as in the case of Walmart.

== Criticism ==
24/7 workplaces can put employees under conditions that limit their personal life choices and development. Calls for a rehumanisation of the 24/7 workplace have therefore been voiced. Some have also remarked on the "collective mania" especially in the US that takes a sort of pride in the "work at all times" attitude exemplified by the 24/7 concept.

In England, Wales, and Northern Ireland, the Sunday trading laws prevent many stores from truly opening 24/7, but they sometimes advertise as such. Some core services such as filling stations are exempt from the law requiring them to close. A campaign against changing the law was supported by many bodies, including the Church of England, the Church in Wales, and many secular bodies in an effort called Keep Sunday Special.

== See also ==
- High availability
- Shopping hours
