= Keep Sunday Special =

British campaign group

Keep Sunday Special is a British campaign group set up in 1985 by Michael Schluter to oppose plans to introduce Sunday trading in England and Wales (there are different arrangements in Scotland and Northern Ireland). The Keep Sunday Special campaign was set up and is run as a conventional secular civil society organisation with support from trade unions, churches, political parties, private businesses, and members of all faiths and of none. It has no connection to the Lord's Day Observance Society.

== History ==
From 1912 to 1938, a series of acts regarding trading were passed into UK law, including that which regulated shops on Sundays, which were later consolidated in the Shops Act 1950. This act was then repealed by the Deregulation and Contracting Out Act 1994, bringing an end to the prohibition of Sunday trade in England and Wales. Under the Sunday Trading Act 1994, large shops are allowed to open for up to six hours on Sundays between 10am and 6pm. The UK Department of Trade and Industry conducted a review of the Act in early 2006 to consider whether to extend opening hours to nine hours or to remove restrictions entirely.

Keep Sunday Special was founded on the idea that such moves by the government would have a damaging effect on families, communities and local economies. An Early Day Motion was signed by nearly 300 MPs. On 6 July 2006, the then Trade and Industry Secretary, Alistair Darling, confirmed that, having considered all the evidence from the review, the Government concluded there should be no change to the Sunday trading laws. The news was welcomed by trade unions and small shops who were afraid large stores would undercut their prices and were opposed to any change in the law.

== See also ==
- Sunday shopping
- Shops Bill 1986
- Shops Act 1950
- Deregulation and Contracting Out Act 1994
- Sunday Trading Act 1994
