= List of government defeats in the House of Commons since 1945 =

The following article is a list of government defeats in the House of Commons of the United Kingdom since 1945; that is, where the government whips have instructed their MPs to vote (or, in rare circumstances, abstain from voting) a certain way on a division of the House and have subsequently been defeated. Whilst most defeats have been on motions or bills scheduled in "government time", on occasion motions proposed by opposition parties or backbench MPs that are critical of government policy or practice, such as opposition day motions, are passed despite the government's efforts.

Most government defeats since World War II have occurred in periods of minority government or where the government has a small majority. Government defeats have been caused by backbench rebellions and by opposition parties voting against a government when they had more MPs present in the House of Commons. Earlier (1918–1945) large (of a margin of more than 100) defeats of governments were for the first MacDonald government, which suffered two defeats by a margin of 166 and 161 respectively on 8 October 1924 regarding the Campbell Case, and by a margin of 140 in June 1924.

This list does not include instances in which the government has withdrawn a bill or withdrawn a voting instruction in order to avoid a defeat. In addition, it does not include instances in which the government faced a large scale rebellion from its own MPs, but avoided defeat due to the support of opposition MPs.

== Attlee (1945–1951) ==
Attlee led two ministries: the first Attlee ministry (1945–1950) and the second Attlee ministry (1950–1951).

These defeats were under the second Attlee ministry, when the Labour Party saw its majority reduced from 146 to 5 seats in the 1950 election.

- 29 March 1950 – A motion to adjourn a debate on fuel was won by the Opposition 283–257.
- 9 April 1951 – An order to reduce cheese rations was annulled.
- 5 July 1951 – The Plasterboard (Prices) (No. 1) Order was annulled.
- 16 July 1951 – An amendment to the Forestry Bill [Lords] was passed 232–229

== Churchill (2nd term, 1951–1955) ==
- 11 November 1953 – Churchill's Government lost a prayer to annul on the Miscellaneous Controls (Revocation) Order 1953.

== Eden (1955–1957) ==
Anthony Eden's Government suffered no defeats in the House of Commons.

== Macmillan (1957–1963) ==
Harold Macmillan's Government suffered no defeats in the House of Commons.

== Douglas-Home (1963–1964) ==
Alec Douglas-Home's short-lived Government suffered no defeats in the House of Commons.

== Wilson (1st term, 1964–1970) ==
- 5 March 1965 – A motion, moved by Conservative MP Forbes Hendry, to put the question on a procedural motion relating to the Murder (Abolition of Death Penalty) Bill was passed by 128–117.
- 5 March 1965 – The aforementioned Conservative motion, namely to discharge the Murder (Abolition of Death Penalty) Bill Standing Committee and replace it with a Committee of the Whole House, was passed by 128–120.
- 6 July 1965 – The second reading of a new clause, tabled by the Conservatives, to the Finance (No. 2) Bill, which sought to ensure that the amount of capital gains tax payable by a unit trust or investment trust did not exceed that payable by an individual, was passed by 180–166.
- 6 July 1965 – A motion to add the aforementioned new clause to the bill was passed by 180–167.
- 6 July 1965 – A motion to adjourn the debate on the Finance (No. 2) Bill, which was opposed by the government, was passed by 180–167.
- 4 May 1970 – A Conservative amendment to the Administration of Justice Bill [Lords] was passed by 105–104.

== Heath (1970–1974) ==
Edward Heath's government suffered six defeats in the House of Commons during its four years in office.

- 24 April 1972 – A new clause, tabled by the Conservative backbencher Geoffrey Finsberg, to the Housing Finance Bill, which related to service charges for unfurnished lettings, was passed with support of opposition parties by 251–247. However, the motion to add the new clause to the bill was later voted down by 245–242.
- 19 July 1972 – An amendment, moved by Conservative backbencher Arthur Jones, to the Local Government Bill, which sought to give new district councils the power to control refuse disposal, was passed with the support of opposition parties by 190–186.
- 20 October 1972 – A Labour amendment to a Lords Amendment on the Criminal Justice Bill, which sought to reduce the minimum age for jury service from 21 to 18, was passed by 53–47.
- 22 November 1972 – A Labour motion to disapprove of the government's Statement of Immigration Rules for Control on Entry was passed by 275–240.
- 13 June 1973 – The second reading of a new clause to the Maplin Development Bill, which orders the Civil Aviation Authority to consult on aerospace development, was approved, despite opposition from the government, by 267–250.
- 12 July 1973 – A government amendment to an opposition motion regarding export licences for sheep was rejected by 285–264.

== Wilson (2nd term, 1974–1976) ==
Harold Wilson's second government suffered 25 defeats in the House of Commons between 1974 and 1976. The majority of these defeats, 18 in total, occurred in June and July 1974, when Wilson did not have a majority in the House of Commons after the February 1974 general election produced a hung parliament. Wilson called a further general election in October 1974 in an attempt to gain a majority. He did, but this majority was just three seats.

- 19 June 1974 – The second reading of a government new clause to the Finance Bill, which sought to continue to exempt trade unions from certain taxes under section 338 of the Income and Corporation Taxes Act 1970, was defeated by 308–299.
- 20 June 1974 – A government amendment to an opposition motion that regretted "the government's damaging industrial policy" was defeated by 311–290.
- 20 June 1974 – The aforementioned opposition motion that regretted "the government's damaging industrial policy" was passed, again by 311–290.
- 27 June 1974 – A government amendment to an opposition motion, endorsing the government's policy on local government finance, was rejected by 298–289.
- 27 June 1974 – An opposition motion, calling for a fundamental reform to the government's local government rates system, was passed by 298–289.
- 11 July 1974 – A Conservative amendment to the Trade Union and Labour Relations Bill, which proposed to make the dismissal of an employee for not being a member of a trade union unfair, was passed by 291–290. The original division resulted in a tied vote of 291–291, but it emerged the next day that one too many 'no' votes had been counted.
- 11 July 1974 – A further amendment to the Trade Union and Labour Relations Bill, which attempted to make the dismissal of an employee on the grounds on refusal to join a trade union unfair was passed by 283–282. Again, the government's defeat was only realised the following day when it became clear that a tied vote had been caused by the overcounting of the 'no' votes.
- 16 July 1974 – The second reading of a Conservative new clause to the Finance Bill, which proposed raising the two limits of corporation tax liability, was passed by 292–267.
- 16 July 1974 – An amendment to the Finance Bill to restrict the rate of pool betting duty was passed by 291–274.
- 16 July 1974 – A government amendment to the Finance Bill, designed to make VAT charges on the hiring of goods retrospective to April 1973, was defeated by 298–280.
- 16 July 1974 – A Liberal amendment to the Finance Bill, proposing to set the additional rate of income tax on investment incomes at 15% on incomes over £2,000, was passed by 296–280.
- 18 July 1974 – A government motion to disagree with a Lords Amendment to the Health and Safety at Work etc. Bill, which proposed to keep responsibility for health and safety in agriculture with the Ministry of Agriculture, Fisheries and Food, was defeated by 159–153.
- 18 July 1974 – A government motion to disagree with a Lords amendment to the Health and Safety at Work etc. Bill, which proposed to give power to non-unionised employees to appoint health and safety representatives, was defeated by 147–143.
- 30 July 1974 – A government motion to disagree with a new clause added by the Lords to the Trade Union and Labour Relations Bill, which proposed to outlaw arbitrary exclusion of a person from a trade union, was defeated by 276–270.
- 30 July 1974 – A government motion to disagree with a new clause added by the Lords to the Trade Union and Labour Relations Bill, which required trade unions to have specified rules for conducting ballots for their governing bodies, was defeated by 280–269.
- 30 July 1974 – A government motion to disagree with a Lords amendment to the Trade Union and Labour Relations Bill, which would allow trade unions who failed to follow the bill's rules to be deregistered, was defeated by 281–271.
- 30 July 1974 – A government motion to disagree with a Lords amendment to the Trade Union and Labour Relations Bill, which would give protection to civil employees taking part in trade disputes, was defeated by 282–272.
- 30 July 1974 – A government motion to disagree with a Lords amendment to the Trade Union and Labour Relations Bill, which would restrict immunities to disputes in Britain and change the rules regarding strikes in Britain in support of foreign workers from the same multi-national company, was defeated by 280–272.
- 29 January 1975 – A government amendment to the Social Security Benefits Bill, which sought to the restore the earnings rule limit for retired people at £13, was defeated by 280–265.
- 2 July 1975 – A government amendment to the Industry Bill, which proposed to remove obligations on government to disclose forecasts of economic parameters to certain companies, was defeated by 220–149.
- 2 July 1975 – A government amendment to the Industry Bill, which sought to remove Schedule 3 from the bill which would make all planning agreements conditional on the government disclosing economic forecasts, was rejected by 230–147.
- 17 July 1975 – A Conservative amendment to the Finance Bill, which proposed to exclude certain television sets from the higher 25% level of VAT, was passed by 108–106.
- 4 August 1975 – A government amendment to disagree with a Lords amendment to the Housing Finance (Special Provisions) Bill, which sought to remove a clause that would disqualify any councillors who failed to implement the Housing Finance Act 1972, was defeated by 268–261.
- 11 February 1976 – An opposition motion to reduce the salary of the Secretary of State for Industry by £1,000, in essence a motion of no confidence, was passed by 214–209. However, the government Chief Whip, Robert Mellish, immediately raised questions as to the outcome of the vote in regards of alleged miscoutings, which in turn led to the government tabling a motion to counter the no confidence motion, which it won by 296–280.
- 10 March 1976 – A motion to approve the government's public expenditure policy was defeated by 284–256. It is unclear whether this motion had any impact on Harold Wilson's resignation, which followed 6 days later.

== Callaghan (1976–1979) ==
James Callaghan's government suffered 34 defeats in the House of Commons during its three years in office. Callaghan's government was a minority one for virtually all of its existence, after the former cabinet minister John Stonehouse resigned from the Labour Party just two days after Callaghan became Prime Minister, leaving Labour one seat short of an overall majority in the House of Commons.

- 28 June 1976 – A motion for the House to adjourn following an opposition debate regarding the Child Benefit Scheme was passed by 259–0. The government abstained from the vote after it became clear that many Labour MPs were willing to break the whip to vote for the adjournment.
- 10 November 1976 – A government motion to disagree with a Lords amendment to the Dock Work Regulation Bill, which required the whole area designated a dock labour scheme to be inside a definable dock area, was defeated by 310–308.
- 10 November 1976 – A government motion to disagree with a Lords amendment to the Dock Work Regulation Bill, which sought to limit a definable dock area to within half a mile of a harbour, was defeated by 311–308.
- 7 February 1977 – The second reading of the Reduction of Redundancy Rebates Bill was rejected by 130–129.
- 22 February 1977 – A government motion to allocate time for the debating of the Scotland and Wales Bill was rejected by 312–283.
- 5 April 1977 – A motion for the House to adjourn following a debate on teacher training colleges in Scotland was passed by 203–185.
- 12 July 1977 – The third reading of the Local Authority Works (Scotland) Bill was rejected by 105–99.
- 13 July 1977 – A new clause to the Criminal Law Bill tabled by a Labour backbencher, which proposed to give people arrested the right to have a person informed of their arrest, was passed by 89–86.
- 22 November 1977 – A motion that Clause 1 of the Scotland Bill, which would have declared that the bill had no effect on the unity of the United Kingdom, should stand part of the bill was defeated by 199–184.
- 5 December 1977 – A motion for the House to adjourn following a debate on the Crown Agents scandal was passed by 158–126.
- 7 December 1977 – A motion that Clause 40 of the Scotland Bill, which required the Secretary of State to have regard for national pay policy, should stand part of the bill was defeated by 161–160.
- 23 January 1978 – A Conservative amendment to set the rate of devaluation of the green pound at 7.5% rather than the proposed 5% was passed by 291–280.
- 23 January 1978 – A motion to devalue the green pound by 7.5% following the previous Conservative amendment was passed by 291–281.
- 25 January 1978 – A backbench Labour amendment to an amendment to the Scotland Bill, which would change the threshold for accepting a 'yes' vote in the devolution referendum from 33% to 40%, was passed by 166–151.
- 25 January 1978 – A motion to accept the previously mentioned amendment, and to require the Secretary of State to repeal the Act if fewer than 40% of the Scottish electorate voted 'yes', was passed by 168–142.
- 25 January 1978 – An amendment to the Scotland Bill, which sought to exclude Orkney and/or Shetland from the provisions of the bill if they were to vote 'no' in a referendum, was passed by 204–118.
- 14 February 1978 – The second reading of a new clause to the Scotland Bill, which stated that no referendum could be held until three months after a general election, was passed by 242–223.
- 15 February 1978 – A government amendment to the Scotland Bill, which would remove the requirement that the Secretary of State repeal the Act if less than 40% of the electorate voted in favour in a referendum, was rejected by 298–243.
- 15 February 1978 – A government amendment to the Scotland Bill, which would reduce the threshold for accepting a 'yes' vote back to 33%, was rejected by 285–240.
- 19 April 1978 – A motion for Clause 82 of the Wales Bill, which set down the conditions surrounding the commencement of the Act, to stand part of the bill was defeated by 259–232.
- 19 April 1978 – An amendment to the Wales Bill, which would require the Secretary of State to lay orders for the repeal of the Act should less than 40% of the electorate vote 'yes' in a devolution referendum, was passed by 280–208.
- 8 May 1978 – A Conservative amendment to the Finance Bill, which would reduce the basic rate on income tax from 34% to 33%, was passed by 312–304.
- 10 May 1978 – A Conservative amendment to the Finance Bill, which raised the level at which the higher rate of income tax became payable from £7,000 to £8,000, was passed by 288–286.
- 10 May 1978 – A motion to return consideration of the Finance Bill to Committee was rejected by 280–273.
- 19 July 1978 – A government motion to disagree with a Lords amendment, which would disqualify Westminster MPs from being members of the Welsh Assembly, was rejected by 293–260.
- 20 July 1978 – A government motion to disagree with a Lords amendment, which would remove forestry from the competence of the Welsh assembly, was defeated by 280–247.
- 24 July 1978 – A motion to approve the draft Dock Labour Scheme 1978 was defeated by 301–291.
- 26 July 1978 – A government motion to disagree with a Lords amendment, which required Scottish MPs to approve the second reading of any Scottish Assembly bill, was rejected by 276–275.
- 26 July 1978 – A government motion to disagree with a Lords amendment, which sought to remove forestry from the transfer of property to the Scottish Assembly, was rejected by 286–266.
- 13 December 1978 – A Conservative amendment, declining to support the government's use of economic sanctions against firms and workers who had negotiated wage increases beyond a Parliamentary-approved limit, was passed by 285–279.
- 13 December 1978 – A motion, as amended by the previous Conservative amendment, opposing the government's use of sanctions on companies awarding pay rises in excess of 5%, was agreed to by 285–283.
- 7 February 1979 – A Conservative amendment to the Nurses, Midwives and Health Visitors Bill, which required at least two members of the general public to serve on the Central Midwifery Committee, was passed by 149–121.
- 22 March 1979 – A Conservative motion to annul the Firearms (Variation of Fees) Order 1979 was passed by 115–26.
- 28 March 1979 – The government lost a motion of no confidence by 311–310, prompting a general election in which Callaghan's Labour party was defeated by Margaret Thatcher's Conservative party.

== Thatcher (1979–1990) ==
During her 11 years in office, Margaret Thatcher's government suffered four House of Commons defeats.

- 15 December 1982 – A motion disapproving of a change in immigration rules was passed 290–272.
- 19 July 1983 – An amendment motion on setting MPs' salaries was defeated 160–233.
- 14 April 1986 – The second reading of the Shops Bill 1986 was defeated 282–296.
- 13 March 1990 – A clause of the National Health Service and Community Care Bill allowing the Secretary of State to adjust individual recipients' Income Support amounts was defeated 219–246.

== Major (1990–1997) ==
John Major's government suffered six defeats in the House of Commons during its seven-year tenure.

- 8 March 1993 – An amendment to the European Communities (Amendment) Bill to require all members of the European Union Committee of the Regions to be elected local government representatives was passed 314–292.
- 22 July 1993 – A motion on the adoption of the Protocol on Social Policy to comply with the European Communities (Amendment) Act 1993 was defeated 324–316.
- 6 December 1994 – A plan to increase VAT on domestic fuel was defeated 319–311.
- 19 December 1995 – A motion supporting the government's negotiating of fishery quotas in an EU meeting was defeated 299–297.
- 10 July 1996 – The Government were defeated on a motion to limit MPs' pay increases by 317–168.
- 27 January 1997 – A vote to allow grant-maintained schools to enlarge their pupil capacity was defeated by 272–273.

== Blair (1997–2007) ==
Tony Blair's government suffered four House of Commons defeats during its 10 years in office, all within a period of one year and after the 2005 general election.

- 9 November 2005 – An amendment to the Terrorism Bill to allow terrorist suspects to be held without charge for 90 days was defeated 291–322.
- 31 January 2006 – A motion to disagree with a Lords amendment to the Racial and Religious Hatred Bill was lost 288–278.
- 31 January 2006 – Another motion on a Lords amendment to the Racial and Religious Hatred Bill was lost by one vote.
- 12 July 2006 – A motion by Nick Clegg to adjourn the Commons early in protest at the UK–US extradition treaty was passed 246–4. The Government whipped its MPs to abstain when it became apparent that many of them were likely to break the whip.

== Brown (2007–2010) ==
Gordon Brown's government suffered three defeats in the House of Commons during its three years in office.

- 29 April 2009 – A motion to retain wording of a Liberal Democrat motion calling for the withdrawal of eligibility guidelines which allowed some Gurkhas to live in the United Kingdom passed by 276–246.
- 25 June 2009 – A motion to authorise the East Midlands regional grand committee to meet in Nottingham during September 2009 was defeated by 104–98.
- 1 July 2009 – The House of Commons, during a Committee of the Whole House, voted down Clause 10 of the Parliamentary Standards Bill, which had been introduced following the parliamentary expenses scandal. The clause, which was defeated by 250–247, would have provided that parliamentary privilege could not be used to prevent the Parliamentary Standards Authority from carrying out investigations against Members of Parliament.

== Cameron (coalition, 2010–2015) ==
David Cameron's coalition government was defeated seven times in the House of Commons.

- 6 December 2011 – A motion 'That this House has considered the matter of the economy' was defeated by 79–213. Such a motion is normally agreed without a division, but the Opposition forced a vote, for which the Government whips were unprepared.
- 31 October 2012 – A rebel amendment calling for a real terms cut in the European Union budget was passed by 307–294.
- 29 August 2013 – A motion provisionally authorising military intervention in the Syrian civil war was defeated 285–272.
- 16 July 2014 – A Ten Minute Rule motion on a bill authorising the Office for Budget Responsibility to scrutinise Opposition manifestos was passed 203–16, after the Opposition forced a division aimed to catch the new Chief Whip, Michael Gove, off-guard in his first full day in office.
- 5 September 2014 – The second reading of a private member's bill by Liberal Democrat MP Andrew George to restrict the cases in which the under-occupancy penalty (colloquially called the "bedroom tax") could be levied was passed 306–231, with the coalition partners imposing three-line whips on opposite sides of the debate.
- 18 November 2014 – A Liberal Democrat rebel amendment giving more freedom to pub landlords to negotiate rents and beer prices with their parent pub chain was passed 284–269.
- 26 March 2015 – A government motion that would change the process in the House for re-electing the Speaker after a general election from an open division to a secret ballot was defeated 228–202.

== Cameron (majority, 2015–2016) ==
David Cameron's majority government was defeated three times in the House of Commons.

- 7 July 2015 – An emergency motion laid down by Lib Dem MP and former Secretary of State for Scotland Alistair Carmichael "That this House has considered the means by which the Government seeks to deliver the objectives outlined by the Leader of the House in his Statement on English Votes on English Laws" was defeated 2–291.
- 7 September 2015 – A Conservative amendment to the European Union Referendum Bill, which sought to amend purdah rules which limit government activity during the campaign period, was rejected by 312–285.
- 9 March 2016 – A rebel amendment to the Enterprise Bill, removing clauses that would have allowed councils in England and Wales to extend Sunday opening hours, passed by 317–286.

== May (majority, 2016–2017) ==
Theresa May's brief majority government from 2016 to 2017 was not defeated in the House of Commons.

== May (minority, 2017–2019) ==
Theresa May's government from 2017 to 2019 was defeated on 33 divisions in the House of Commons. Furthermore, to prevent recorded defeats, May's government typically whipped to abstain on non-binding Opposition Day motions it did not envisage winning on division.

- 18 October 2017: An Opposition Day motion from Labour calling for the rollout of Universal Credit to be paused was passed 299–0. This was the first Opposition Day debate on which Labour forced a division.
- 29 November 2017: An Opposition Day motion from the Scottish National Party calling for the Government to improve transitional arrangements for women affected by increases to the state pension age was passed 288–0.
- 13 December 2017: An amendment to the European Union (Withdrawal) Bill to give Parliament a "meaningful vote" on the final Brexit deal was passed 309–305.
- 28 March 2018: Two Opposition Day motions from Labour were passed after division: the first, on local government funding, was passed 238–0; the second, on police funding, was passed 203–0.
- 17 July 2018: A new clause submitted to the post-Brexit Trade Bill aiming to protect the links between the UK and the European Medicines Agency was passed 305–301.
- 4 December 2018: An Opposition motion finding Ministers in contempt of Parliament for not complying with the 13 November 2018 humble address was passed 311–293. This is the first time an entire Government, as opposed to an individual Minister, had been held in contempt of Parliament. A government amendment to refer the case to the Privileges Committee instead failed 307–311.
- 4 December 2018: An amendment to the programme motion on the withdrawal agreement debate, to allow for the amendment of a mandatory government motion in the case the withdrawal agreement is defeated, was passed 321–293.
- 11 December 2018: An emergency motion that "the House has considered" the decision by May to postpone the "meaningful vote", which was scheduled to be voted on that day, was rejected 0–299.
- 8 January 2019: An amendment to the Finance Bill limiting the Government's powers in the event of a no-deal scenario was passed 303–296. This was the first recorded Government defeat on a Finance Bill since 1978.
- 9 January 2019: A rebel amendment by Dominic Grieve to the programme motion for the debate on the EU withdrawal agreement, compelling the PM to respond within three days with an alternative plan if the Commons does not accept the Withdrawal Agreement, was passed 308–297.
- 15 January 2019: The motion under section 13(1)(b) of the European Union (Withdrawal) Act 2018 to approve the Brexit withdrawal agreement—otherwise known as the "meaningful vote"—was rejected 202–432. With an opposition majority of 230 votes, it was the largest defeat on a government motion in the era of universal suffrage, 64 votes more than the previous largest defeat when Prime Minister Ramsay MacDonald lost a confidence vote by 166 on 8 October 1924.
- 29 January 2019: An amendment tabled by Caroline Spelman to May's statement on the defeat of her withdrawal agreement stating that the UK will not leave the EU without a withdrawal agreement was passed 318–310; this amendment is advisory in nature.
- 14 February 2019: The Government "next steps" motion, seeking continued support for its approach to leaving the European Union, was defeated 258–303.
- 12 March 2019: A second "meaningful vote" rejected the Withdrawal Agreement again, with a reduced majority of 242–391.
- 13 March 2019: A non-binding amendment to the Government's motion in response to the second meaningful vote, categorically rejecting a no-deal Brexit under any circumstances, was passed 312–308. The motion as amended, and as a result opposed by the Government, was passed 321–278.
- 26 March 2019: An amendment passed 329–302 to allow MPs to take control of parliamentary business on a Wednesday and therefore stage a series of "indicative votes" on which Brexit option MP's prefer. The motion itself as amended, and thus opposed by the government, passed 327–300.
- 27 March 2019: A Business of the House motion to enable MPs to take control of the day's business and hold "indicative votes" on preferred Brexit options passed 331–287.
- 29 March 2019: A hitherto unprecedented third "meaningful vote" rejected the Withdrawal Agreement once more, with a reduced majority of 286–344. The bill did not include the Political Declaration.
- 1 April 2019: A Business of the House Motion, again enabling MPs to control the day's business for the purpose of a second round of indicative votes was passed 322–277.
- 3 April 2019: The Government were defeated multiple times on the European Union (Withdrawal) (No. 5) Bill, also known as the "Cooper–Letwin Bill".
  - A Business of the House Motion to enable Parliament to debate the bill was passed 312–311. In addition, there was one tied division—the first since 1993—in which the Government defeated an amendment on the business motion that would have scheduled a third round of "indicative votes" for 8 April; with the Speaker's casting vote, the Government won the vote 311–310.
  - The second reading of the bill passed 315–310.
  - An amendment that would allow the Government to consent to an extension proposed by the European Council without the agreement upon by the House was defeated 304–313.
  - An amendment that would allow the Government to seek a withdrawal date without the agreement of the House was defeated 220–400.
  - The third reading of the bill passed 313–312.
- 19 June 2019: The Government were defeated twice on the Parliamentary Buildings (Restoration and Renewal) Bill.
  - An amendment to prevent the practice of blacklisting employees or potential employees from employment was passed 211–132.
  - An amendment to make sure that economic benefits from the Parliamentary building works are delivered across all nations and regions of the UK passed 203–117.
- 9 July 2019: An amendment to the Northern Ireland (Executive Formation) Bill tabled by former Attorney General Dominic Grieve requiring the government to make fortnightly statements on its efforts to restore devolved government in Northern Ireland – and thus make prorogation of Parliament more difficult – was passed 294–293.
- 18 July 2019: The Government was again defeated twice on the Northern Ireland (Executive Formation) Bill.
  - An amendment tabled by Hilary Benn and Alistair Burt requiring the House of Commons to sit for five days following any fortnightly statement, even during a prorogation, was passed 315–274.
  - The House of Commons accepted a House of Lords amendment to Dominic Grieve's amendment, further strengthening Parliament's power to sit despite prorogation, 315–273.

In addition, three humble addresses were passed without division. Unlike Opposition Day motions, these are binding.

- 1 November 2017: A humble address for a return from Labour intended to force the Government to furnish hitherto unpublished sectoral impact assessments to the Exiting the European Union Select Committee was passed without division. It later transpired that the impact assessments did not exist, despite assurances from Brexit Secretary David Davis that they had been created in excruciating detail.
- 5 December 2017: A humble address for a return from Labour to force the Government to publish five project assessment reviews linked to Universal Credit was passed without division.
- 13 November 2018: A humble address for a return from Labour to force the Government to publish the "full and final" legal advice regarding the Brexit withdrawal agreement was passed without division.

== Johnson (minority, 2019) ==
Boris Johnson's government from July 2019 until the general election in December was defeated on 12 divisions in the House of Commons. It lost its working majority on its first sitting day of Parliament and was defeated on its very first division. Johnson became the first Prime Minister this happened to since Lord Rosebery in 1894. The government did not win a single division until 15 October, six weeks after Parliament's first sitting.

- 3 September 2019: The Government was defeated 328–301 on an emergency debate motion on the European Union (Withdrawal) (No. 6) Bill that would force the government to request an extension to Brexit negotiations.
- 4 September 2019:
  - The second reading of the European Union (Withdrawal) (No. 6) Bill, mandating Johnson to seek an extension to the Brexit negotiations, passed 329–300.
  - The third reading of the European Union (Withdrawal) (No. 6) Bill passed 327–299.
  - A motion under the Fixed-term Parliaments Act 2011 calling for an early election failed 298–56, well short of the 434 required for such a motion to pass. Labour whipped its MPs to abstain, as the party wanted an election, but not before a no-deal Brexit had been prevented.
- 9 September 2019:
  - A humble address to force the government to publish documents regarding no-deal preparations under Operation Yellowhammer and correspondence regarding prorogation was passed 311–302.
  - Another motion under the Fixed-term Parliaments Act 2011 calling for an early election failed 293–47, well short of the 434 required for such a motion to pass. Labour MPs again abstained.
- 26 September 2019: A motion to recess Parliament during the Conservative Party Conference, after the prorogation of Parliament was declared void, was defeated 289–306. This was the first time that a major UK-wide party had failed to win a recess for party conference season.
- 17 October 2019: An amendment to a government motion, extending the proposed Saturday sitting to debate the Brexit withdrawal agreement and allowing multiple amendments to be put to a vote, passed 287–275.
- 19 October 2019: An amendment by Oliver Letwin withholding Parliament's approval for the Brexit withdrawal agreement until the necessary law has been passed to enact it, thereby requiring Boris Johnson to request an Article 50 extension until 31 January 2020 under the European Union (Withdrawal) (No.6) Bill, passed 322–306.
- 22 October 2019: The government's programme motion, which would have provided only three days for the House of Commons to debate the Withdrawal Agreement Bill, was defeated 322–308.
- 28 October 2019: A third motion under the Fixed-term Parliaments Act 2011 calling for an early election failed 299–70, well short of the 434 required for such a motion to pass.
- 29 October 2019: An amendment by Stella Creasy to a Business of the House motion for an Early Parliamentary General Election bill to ensure that amendments to the bill could be submitted by MPs not acting on behalf of the Government passed 312–295. Furthermore, an opposition amendment to the European Union (Withdrawal) (No. 6) Bill on 4 September 2019, requiring that Parliament vote again on the withdrawal agreement negotiated by May, passed by default after the government failed to provide any tellers for the No lobby. Although this was officially a defeat for the government, political commentators speculated it was a deliberate attempt either to insert a wrecking amendment or to obscure the potential support for May's deal.

== Johnson (majority, 2019–2022) ==
Boris Johnson's second government was defeated four times in the House of Commons.

- 24 June 2020: A humble address to force the publication of documents relating to the approval of planning permission for the Westferry Printworks Development passed without division.
- 18 January 2021: Two Opposition Day motions from Labour were passed after a forced division. The first, on universal credit and working tax credit, passed 278–0; the second, on access to remote education and the quality of free school meals, passed 272–0, with most Conservative MPs not voting.
- 15 September 2021: An Opposition Day motion from Labour, calling on the government to cancel a planned £20-per-week cut in Universal Credit, was passed 253–0.

== Truss (2022) ==
Liz Truss's short-lived government suffered no defeats in the House of Commons.

== Sunak (2022–2024) ==
- 4 December 2023: An amendment to the Victims and Prisoners Bill which required the Government to set up the body to pay restitution to victims of the contaminated blood scandal. The Government had committed to dealing with this by amending its own Bill in the House of Lords, however, Home Affairs Select Committee Chair Dame Diana Johnson pushed it to the vote while the Government had a 3-line whip against the amendment. Labour had announced its support for the amendment the previous day. It passed 246–242.

== Starmer (2024–2026) ==
Keir Starmer's government did not suffer any defeats in the House of Commons.

== See also ==
- List of British governments
