= Jubilee Centre =

Christian organization based in the United Kingdom

The Jubilee Centre is a Christian organization based in the United Kingdom. It was founded in 1983 by Michael Schluter. It is the publisher of the Jubilee Manifesto and has a quarterly publication, the Cambridge Papers.

The Jubilee Centre is a British registered charity (No. 288783).

== See also ==
- List of UK think tanks
