= Pete Luckett =

British-Canadian entrepreneur and media personality

- Born: 1953 (age 71–72); Nottingham, England
- Occupation(s): Entrepreneur, media personality

Pete Luckett (born 1953) is a British-Canadian entrepreneur and media personality known as a culinary fruit and vegetable expert. A native of Nottingham, England, Luckett emigrated to Canada in 1979, settling in Saint John, New Brunswick. In the early 1990s, he moved from Saint John to Bedford, Nova Scotia; he lives in Gaspereau, Nova Scotia.

== Enterprises ==
=== Pete's Fine Foods (ex-Pete's Frootique) ===
Luckett became widely known in the Maritimes for his Pete's Fine Foods (formerly Pete's Frootique) specialty grocery stores. The first Pete's Frootique store opened in 1981 at the Saint John City Market. This was subsequently run by Pete's nephew and his partner. This was followed by a second store that opened on Mountain Road in Moncton. In 1992, the third Pete's Frootique store opened at the Sunnyside Mall in Bedford. In 2004, the fourth Pete's Frootique store opened on Dresden Row in downtown Halifax, and the fifth Pete's Frootique opened in Wolfville in 2012. On March 27, 2015, Pete's announced that the Wolfville location would close at the end of May 2015. A press release indicated that the Wolfville store was unable to attract enough local customers to become profitable.

The Pete's Fine Foods stores are all different in scale. The Bedford store is the most expansive and up-scale as it houses the following operating divisions: a power juice bar, a gourmet fruit and gift basket shop, a European delicatessen, a gourmet butcher and fish shop, a British specialty food emporium named Best of Britain, and a wine shop.

==== Sale to Sobeys ====
In October 2015, Luckett announced that the national grocery chain Sobeys would be entering into an agreement to purchase the Pete’s Fine Foods grocery retail and wholesale business.

=== Luckett Vineyards ===
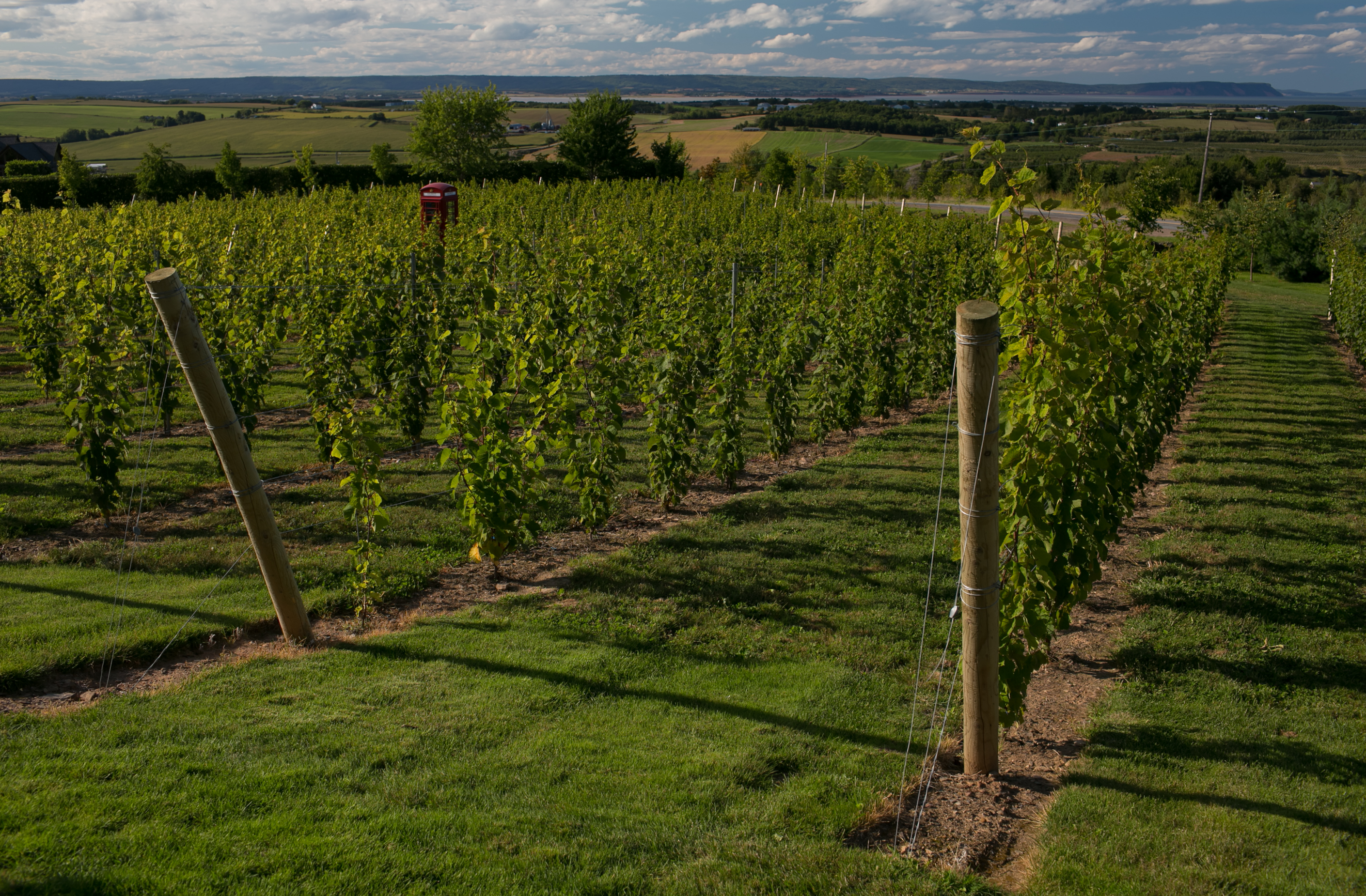
Luckett vineyard in the Gaspereau River valley

In 2010, Luckett opened Luckett Vineyards, a vineyard and winery in Gaspereau Valley, Nova Scotia. He also operates a farm that supplies vegetables and fruit to his stores, as well as commercial customers such as restaurants and caterers. As of 2023, Luckett Vineyards has been bought and run by Pete's daughter Geena Luckett.

=== Media personality ===
Luckett's TV career started while in Saint John as a frequent guest on the CBC television show Midday. Upon moving to Nova Scotia in the early 1990s, Luckett became a contributing guest to the Halifax CTV affiliate, ATV, where he hosted a bi-weekly segment on fruit and vegetables on the supperhour news show Live at Five. Luckett's catchphrase in his broadcast media appearances is "Toodlee-doo."

Luckett hosted the Food Network series The Food Hunter where he travels around the world. Luckett has also written a column for the Halifax Chronicle-Herald and serves as a consultant for Chartwells, which delivers all food services at Acadia University, near his home.

Luckett has also appeared on such programs as CBC's Steven and Chris. In December 2011, Luckett starred as a cab driver at the end of a TV ad for the NSLC encouraging Nova Scotians not to drink and drive by saying "If you've had a few, your car has too". The ad shows cars parked outside a party as drunk saying such phrases as "I love you man" and other drunken ramblings.

== Impact on retailing in Nova Scotia ==
In 1999, Luckett made headlines when he won a court battle against the Government of Nova Scotia when he sought to keep his Bedford store open on Sunday. To circumvent Nova Scotia's Sunday shopping laws, Luckett registered sections of his Bedford store as separate businesses. He copied this approach at his Halifax store when it opened in 2004. In October 2006, the province's Sunday shopping restrictions were overturned after both Sobeys and Atlantic Superstore copied Luckett's approach to several of their supermarkets, forcing the government to enact restrictions that were successfully contested in court. In 2014, Pete's Frootique became Pete's Fine Foods.
