= Shops Bill 1986 =

Parliamentary bill in the United Kingdom

The Shops Bill 1986 was a parliamentary bill in the United Kingdom that would have ended government regulation of Sunday shopping in England and Wales. Introduced by the Government of Margaret Thatcher, it was defeated in the House of Commons at its second reading; this is the most recent occasion at which a government bill has fallen at that stage.

The Shops Act 1950 regulated Sunday shopping hours, making it illegal for shops to sell most products on a Sunday. The Auld Committee, chaired by Robin Auld, found that the regime established by the 1950 Act was unworkable, with arbitrary exemptions and widespread breaches by large retailers. The subsequent Auld Report recommended that the Shops Act 1950 be repealed, which the government accepted and adopted into its legislative programme.

Thatcher had anticipated that the Labour Party would oppose the bill, spurred by trade unions' fears that shopworkers would be forced to work on Sundays. However, she did not anticipate the backlash from social conservatives. 72 Conservative backbenchers defied a three line whip, voting against the bill at second reading – just after midnight on the morning of 15 April 1986 – and it was defeated by 14 votes. This occasion marks one of only four times Thatcher was defeated in the House of Commons, and the only time an entire government bill was defeated during her tenure.

Sunday trading was ultimately relaxed by the Sunday Trading Act 1994, the twenty-seventh attempt to do so.

== See also ==
- Keep Sunday Special
