= 2004 Nova Scotia Sunday shopping plebiscite =

2004 elections in Canada

Nova Scotia Sunday Shopping Plebiscite
- October 16, 2004
- Should there be Sunday shopping (in retail businesses not now permitted to be open on Sunday)?

Results
Choice	Votes	%
Yes	81,110	45.10%
No	98,726	54.90%
Total votes	179,836	100.00%
- Plebiscite was held: October 16, 2004

A plebiscite on Sunday shopping was held on October 16, 2004 (to coincide with municipal elections) in Nova Scotia. The vote was 54.90% for the "no" side, meaning that a Sunday shopping ban remained in place.

The issue pitted the municipality of Halifax against smaller towns and rural municipalities where many older residents favoured the ban.

== History ==
Prior to the plebiscite, Nova Scotia was the last province to maintain a widespread ban on Sunday shopping. The ban, known as the Retail Business Uniform Closing Day Act, forbade all stores, with the exception of convenience stores, from opening on any Sunday.

In December 1993, the Liberal government conducted an experiment in which stores were opened on several weekends prior to Christmas. On April 13, 1994, then-Finance Minister Bernie Boudreau announced that the government decided against continuing the experiment.

In 2000, lobby groups pushed to end the ban, including the Halifax Chamber of Commerce, which argued that opening on Sundays could bring an extra $21 million in revenue. The Tourism Industry Association of Nova Scotia argued that shoppers should be able to choose when they shop, not the government. Premier John Hamm stated during the 2000 municipal elections that he would like to keep Sundays free for families. According to a survey by the Canadian Federation of Independent Business taken in the spring of 2000, nearly 63 per cent of independent retailers across Nova Scotia were opposed to any changes to Sunday shopping ban.

On September 26, 2003, Justice Minister Michael Baker introduced legislation that allowed a trial period for Sunday shopping on the six Sunday afternoons leading up to Christmas. The bill further authorized a binding plebiscite on the issue during the 2004 municipal elections.

== Issues ==
Opponents of the ban said that Sunday shopping should be allowed in order for consumers to have a choice and to keep up with the times. They also argued it would provide a $19 million annual boost to the economy. Supporters of the ban campaigned under the slogan "Dare to be Different" and stated that the province's laid-back character was at stake. They argued the province should take a stand against the tide of materialism they see as sweeping North America.

== Question ==
The first question was as follows:

Should there be Sunday shopping (in retail businesses not now permitted to be open on Sunday)?

The second question was as follows:

If there is to be Sunday shopping (in retail businesses not now permitted to be open on Sunday), should it be on every Sunday or on only the six Sundays immediately before Christmas?

== Results ==
=== First question ===
No: 98,726 (54.90%)	Yes: 81,110 (45.10%)
▲

=== Second question ===
Every Sunday: 66,011 (44.86%)	Only the six Sundays immediately before Christmas: 81,146 (55.14%)
▲

== Later developments ==
Despite the result of the plebiscite, the Nova Scotia government began allowing year-round Sunday shopping from October 2006 after grocery chains won a court case against the government over the Sunday shopping regulations.
