= Day One Christian Ministries =

Religious organisation

- Formation: 1831
- Website: dayone.co.uk
- Formerly called: Lord's Day Observance Society

Day One Christian Ministries, formerly known as the Lord's Day Observance Society (LDOS), is a Christian organisation based in the United Kingdom that lobbies for no work on Sunday, the day that many Christians celebrate as the Sabbath, a day of rest. This position is based on the fourth (by the Hebrew reckoning) of the Ten Commandments. Day One incorporates Day One Publications (its publishing arm) and the Daylight Christian Prison Trust.

The Lord's Day Observance Society was founded by Joseph Wilson and Daniel Wilson in 1831. It became the most powerful sabbatarian organisation in England, opposed to Sunday newspapers, train travel, and mail delivery. According to Stephen Miller, their "clamor for change provoked a backlash", and there was conflict in Victorian England over this issue for the rest of the nineteenth century. In a 1953 speech to Parliament, John Parker described it as "one of the strongest pressure groups in this country."

LDOS later united with other sabbatarian organisations, including the Working Men's Lord's Day Rest Association (1920), the Lord's Day Observance Association of Scotland (1953), and the Imperial Alliance for the Defence of Sunday (1965).

== See also ==
- Blue law
- Keep Sunday Special
- Religion in the United Kingdom
- Sabbath desecration
- Sunday shopping
