= Sunday Working (Scotland) Act 2003 =

Act of the Parliament of the United Kingdom

Sunday Working (Scotland) Act 2003 (Note: Section 4.)
- Act of Parliament
- Parliament of the United Kingdom
- Long title: An Act to make provision as to the rights of shop workers and betting workers under the law of Scotland in relation to Sunday working; and for connected purposes.
- Citation: 2003 c. 18
- Introduced by: David Cairns MP (private member's bill) (Commons); Lord Hogg of Cumbernauld (Lords)
- Territorial extent: United Kingdom

Dates
- Royal assent: 10 July 2003
- Commencement: 10 July 2003 (sections 3 and 4); 6 April 2004 (section 1); (Note: Section 3. The Sunday Working (Scotland) Act 2003 (Commencement No. 1) Order 2004 (SI 2004/958).)
Other legislation
| Amends | Employment Rights Act 1996 |

Status: Current legislation

Text of statute as originally enacted

Revised text of statute as amended

The Sunday Working (Scotland) Act 2003 (c. 18) is an act of the Parliament of the United Kingdom. The aim of the act was to close an anomaly in employment law in the United Kingdom, whereby shopworkers in England and Wales and Northern Ireland had the legal right to refuse to work on a Sunday, when shopworkers in Scotland did not enjoy this right.

== History ==
The anomaly arose from the different legislation in force in Scotland and the rest of the UK regarding Sunday trading. In Scotland, there was never any legislation preventing Sunday trading, and shops could choose their own opening hours. However, Sunday trading was illegal in England and Wales under the Shops Act 1950. In practice, Scottish shops did not usually open on a Sunday as a matter of custom.

Towards the end of the 20th century, demand for Sunday trading increased, and many Scottish shops began to open on a Sunday. An act of Parliament, the Sunday Trading Act 1994 was passed to allow shops to trade on a Sunday in England and Wales, subject to certain conditions. The 1994 act also gave shopworkers in England and Wales the right to refuse to work on a Sunday (unless their contract was for work solely on a Sunday). However, as the act did not extend to Scotland, the same rights were not enjoyed by Scottish shopworkers.

Despite the differences most retailers did not force Sunday working on staff in Scotland and, generally, they were treated the same as staff in the rest of the UK, particularly the Scottish staff of UK wide chains. However, in 2001, the retail chain, Argos sparked fury in Scotland when they sacked 11 employees for refusing to work on a Sunday. Although they later backed down, several Scottish MPs raised questions on the different legal rights between the different parts of the UK, and demanded that the right to refuse to work on a Sunday be enjoyed by workers in Scotland also.

Thus, a private member's bill introduced to the House of Commons by David Cairns, MP for Aberdeen North and was introduced to the House of Lords by former Labour MP Lord Hogg of Cumbernauld.

== Provisions ==
=== Section 1 - Sunday working: shop and betting workers in Scotland ===
Section 1 of the act amends the Employment Rights Act 1996. It came into force on 6 April 2004.

== Sections 3 and 4 ==
Sections 3 and 4 came into force on 10 July 2003.
