= Sunday Trading Act 1994 =

Act of the Parliament of the United Kingdom

Sunday Trading Act 1994 (Note: Section 9(1).)
- Act of Parliament
- Parliament of the United Kingdom
- Long title: An Act to reform the law of England and Wales relating to Sunday trading; to make provision as to the rights of shop workers under the law of England and Wales in relation to Sunday working; and for connected purposes.
- Citation: 1994 c. 20
- Territorial extent: England and Wales (Note: Section 9(4).)

Dates
- Royal assent: 5 July 1994
- Commencement: 5 July 1994 (in part); 26 August 1994 (rest of act); (Note: Section 9(3). The Sunday Trading Act 1994 Appointed Day Order 1994 (SI 1994/1841).)
Other legislation
Amends	See § Repealed enactments
Repeals/revokes	See § Repealed enactments
Amended by	Deregulation and Contracting Out Act 1994; Employment Protection (Part-time Employees) Regulations 1995; Employment Tribunals Act 1996; Employment Rights Act 1996; Employment Rights (Northern Ireland) Order 1996; Licensing Act 2003; Christmas Day (Trading) Act 2004; Regulatory Reform (Sunday Trading) Order 2004; Veterinary Medicines Regulations 2006; Consumer Rights Act 2015; Legal Aid, Sentencing and Punishment of Offenders Act 2012 (Fines on Summary Conviction) Regulations 2015
Relates to	Shops Act 1950

Status: Amended

Text of statute as originally enacted

Revised text of statute as amended

Text of the Sunday Trading Act 1994 as in force today (including any amendments) within the United Kingdom, from legislation.gov.uk.

The Sunday Trading Act 1994 (c. 20) is an act of the Parliament of the United Kingdom governing the right of shops in England and Wales to trade on a Sunday. Buying and selling on Sunday had previously been illegal, with exceptions, under the Shops Act 1950 (14 Geo. 6. c. 28).

== Background ==
Following the defeat of the Shops Bill 1986, which would have enabled widespread Sunday trading, compromise legislation was introduced in July 1994 in England and Wales, coming into force on 26 August 1994, allowing shops to open, but restricting opening times of larger stores i.e. those over 280 m^{2} (3,000 sq ft) to a maximum of six hours, between 10:00-18:00 only. Large retail park shops usually open 11:00-17:00, with supermarkets more usually choosing 10:00-16:00. In Central London, for example on Oxford Street, many shops choose to open from 12:00-18:00. This includes large 24-hour supermarkets, which meant that supermarkets have to close on Saturday night to allow six continuous hours of shopping within the allotted time.

However, some of the stores open half an hour earlier to allow people to "browse", but do not allow sales before the allotted time. Deliveries to the large stores are not permitted to be loaded or unloaded before 09:00. Large shops were excluded from opening on Easter Sunday and Christmas Day (when it fell on a Sunday), but the Christmas Day (Trading) Act 2004 made it illegal for large shops to open on Christmas Day regardless of whatever day of the week it falls upon.

Shops in Scotland, where Sunday trading had always been generally unregulated, retained the right to open at any time. However, the right for workers in Scotland to refuse to work on a Sunday was later conferred by the Sunday Working (Scotland) Act 2003. Northern Ireland has separate laws governing Sunday opening.

The Sunday Trading Bill had met with considerable opposition from the Lord's Day Observance Society and other groups such as the Keep Sunday Special campaign, a coalition body which includes the shopworkers' trade union USDAW. USDAW finally agreed to support six-hour Sunday trading in return for a promise that Sunday working would be strictly voluntary. This decision played an important role in encouraging many Labour MPs to back the bill in a free vote. They asked for a guarantee of premium pay, but the Government's position was that that was a matter for negotiation between shopworkers or their unions and their employers and the Act says nothing about the rate of pay for Sunday working.

== Provisions ==
Section 1 of the act provided for schedules 1 and 2 to come into force on a day appointed by the Secretary of State by order, and for sections 47 to 66 of, and schedules 5, 6 and 7 to, the Shops Act 1950 (14 Geo. 6. c. 28) to cease to have effect on that day. Schedule 1 provided that a "large shop", with a relevant floor area exceeding 280 square metres, was not to be open on Sunday for the serving of retail customers except in accordance with a notice given to the local authority specifying a continuous period of six hours between 10 a.m. and 6 p.m. It also set out the shops exempt from that restriction, and prohibited large shops from opening on Easter Day or Christmas Day. Contravention was an offence punishable on summary conviction by a fine not exceeding £50,000. Schedule 2 required local authorities to enforce the restrictions, gave their inspectors powers of entry and inspection, and made provision for shops occupied by persons observing the Jewish Sabbath.

Section 2 and schedule 3 allowed a local authority to designate its area as a loading control area, in which the occupier of a large shop could not load or unload goods before 9 a.m. on Sunday without the authority's consent. Section 3 provided that a lease or agreement made before the commencement of the section that required a shop to be open during normal business hours was not to be read as requiring the shop to open on Sunday. Section 4 and schedule 4 gave shop workers rights in relation to Sunday working. Section 5 disapplied Part I of the Shops Act 1950 (hours of closing) on Sunday, and section 6 allowed the Secretary of State to repeal or amend local acts by order. Section 7 provided for expenses, section 8 defined "local authority" and section 9 provided the short title, the repeals in schedule 5, commencement and extent.

=== Repealed enactments ===
Section 9(2) of the act repealed 9 enactments, listed in schedule 5 to the act.

Citation	Short title	Extent of repeal
23 & 24 Geo. 5. c. 12	Children and Young Persons Act 1933	Section 20(3).
14 Geo. 6. c. 28	Shops Act 1950	Sections 47 to 66.
14 Geo. 6. c. 28	Shops Act 1950	In section 71(7)(b), the words "or Part IV".
14 Geo. 6. c. 28	Shops Act 1950	Schedules 5, 6 and 7.
10 & 11 Eliz. 2. c. 35	Shops (Airports) Act 1962	In section 1(1) the words from "and of" to "Sunday trading)".
1963 c. 33	London Government Act 1963	Section 51(3).
1963 c. 37	Children and Young Persons Act 1963	Section 35(3).
1965 c. 35	Shops (Early Closing Days) Act 1965	In section 4(2), the words from "and, notwithstanding" to the end.
1969 c. 48	Post Office Act 1969	In Schedule 4, in paragraph 51, the words from "and Schedule 5" to "on Sunday)".
1986 c. 31	Airports Act 1986	Section 70.
1986 c. 31	Airports Act 1986	In Schedule 5, paragraph 15.
1989 c. 38	Employment Act 1989	In Schedule 3, in Part III, paragraph 2(c).

== Exemptions ==
Some categories of large shops are exempt from the act:

- Airport shops
- Pharmacies
- Goods from exhibition stalls
- Farm shops that sell their own produce (including fishmongers)
- Petrol filling stations
- Railway stations
- Motorway service stations

Small shops with a floor area of under and up to 280 square metres (3,000 square feet) may open if they wish to.

== 2012 suspension ==
In the run up to the 2012 Olympic Games, the Sunday Trading (London Olympic Games and Paralympic Games) Act 2012 was passed stipulating that Sunday trading laws would be suspended by the government on eight weekends from 22 July during the Olympics and Paralympics. This was a temporary measure, and the relaxation expired at the end of the summer.

== Ongoing debate ==
The debate over Sunday trading laws was reignited in 2014, when a ComRes poll commissioned by pressure group 'Open Sundays' revealed that 72% of people believe they should be able to shop whenever is convenient to them. The debate gained further political traction in May of the same year, when Philip Davies MP tabled five amendments to the Deregulation Bill which aimed at abolishing or liberalising the current Sunday trading laws. Although these amendments were ultimately rejected, the debate continued to receive attention, with Davies appearing on the BBC's Daily Politics on 2 July 2014 and labelling the current regulations as "completely absurd and unjustifiable".

It was proposed in the July 2015 Budget that the Sunday trading laws might be relaxed and shops over 280 m^{2} (3,000 sq ft) be able to open longer. However this proposal was defeated in a House of Commons vote.

== Subsequent developments ==
Section 5 was repealed, with effect from 1 December 1994, by the Deregulation and Contracting Out Act 1994. The rights of shop workers in schedule 4 were repealed with effect from 22 August 1996 and re-enacted in the Employment Rights Act 1996.

The Regulatory Reform (Sunday Trading) Order 2004 (SI 2004/470), which came into force on 27 February 2004, removed the requirement for the occupier of a large shop to give notice of its Sunday opening hours, and replaced it with a general permission to open for any continuous period of six hours between 10 a.m. and 6 p.m. The Christmas Day (Trading) Act 2004 prohibited the opening of large shops on Christmas Day whatever day of the week it falls on, with effect from 9 December 2004. The offence of opening a large shop in contravention of the restriction became punishable by an unlimited fine rather than a fine not exceeding £50,000 from 12 March 2015, and from 1 October 2015 the enforcement powers of entry and inspection in schedule 2 were replaced by a reference to the investigatory powers in schedule 5 to the Consumer Rights Act 2015.

== See also ==
- Sunday trading
- Keep Sunday Special
- Blue law (US and Canada)
- Sunday Sabbatarianism
