= Christmas Day (Trading) Act 2004 =

UK law regulating business operations on Christmas Day

Christmas Day (Trading) Act 2004 (Note: Section 6(1).)
- Act of Parliament
- Parliament of the United Kingdom
- Long title: An Act to prohibit the opening of large shops on Christmas Day and to restrict the loading or unloading of goods at such shops on Christmas Day.
- Citation: 2004 c. 26
- Territorial extent: England and Wales (Note: Section 6(4).)

Dates
- Royal assent: 28 October 2004
- Commencement: 9 December 2004 (Note: Section 6(3). The Christmas Day (Trading) Act 2004 (Commencement) Order 2004 (SI 2004/3235).)
Other legislation
Amends	Sunday Trading Act 1994
Amended by	Consumer Rights Act 2015; Legal Aid, Sentencing and Punishment of Offenders Act 2012 (Fines on Summary Conviction) Regulations 2015

Status: Amended

Text of statute as originally enacted

Revised text of statute as amended

The Christmas Day (Trading) Act 2004 (c. 26) is an act of the Parliament of the United Kingdom.

== Background ==
The legislation was introduced to the House of Commons by Kevan Jones, MP for North Durham as a private member's bill.

== Provisions ==
It prevents shops over 280 m^{2} from opening on Christmas Day in England and Wales. The act exempts convenience stores, shops at airports, railway stations and motorway service stations, farm shops and pharmacies for the sale of medicine.

== Reception ==
The legislation was supported by the Union of Shop, Distributive and Allied Workers, a trade union representing shopworkers.

== Further developments ==
A private member's bill which would have given Boxing Day a similar status was debated in Parliament in 2016.
