= Deregulation and Contracting Out Act 1994 =

Act of the Parliament of the United Kingdom

Deregulation and Contracting Out Act 1994 (Note: Section 82(1).)
- Act of Parliament
- Parliament of the United Kingdom
- Long title: An Act to amend, and make provision for the amendment of, statutory provisions and rules of law in order to remove or reduce certain burdens affecting persons in the carrying on of trades, businesses or professions or otherwise, and for other deregulatory purposes; to make further provision in connection with the licensing of operators of goods vehicles; to make provision for and in connection with the contracting out of certain functions vested in Ministers of the Crown, local authorities, certain governmental bodies and the holders of certain offices; and for purposes connected therewith.
- Citation: 1994 c. 40
- Territorial extent: England and Wales; Scotland; Northern Ireland (in part); (Note: Section 82(8).)

Dates
- Royal assent: 3 November 1994
- Commencement: various (Note: Section 82(2)–(5).)

Other legislation
- Amends: Road Traffic Act 1960; Courts Act 1971; Local Government (Scotland) Act 1973; Restrictive Trade Practices Act 1976; Public Passenger Vehicles Act 1981; Cinemas Act 1985; Weights and Measures Act 1985; Company Directors Disqualification Act 1986; Building Societies Act 1986; Road Traffic (Consequential Provisions) Act 1988; Water Industry Act 1991; Social Security Administration Act 1992; Social Security Administration (Northern Ireland) Act 1992; Trade Union Reform and Employment Rights Act 1993; Sunday Trading Act 1994; Employment Rights Act 1996
- Amended by: Goods Vehicles (Licensing of Operators) Act 1995; Gas Act 1995; Employment Tribunals Act 1996; Registration of Political Parties Act 1998; Regulatory Reform Act 2001; Communications Act 2003; Statute Law (Repeals) Act 2004; Charities Act 2011; Policing and Crime Act 2017; Employment Rights Act 2025
- Relates to: Sunday Observance Act 1780

Status: Amended

History of passage through Parliament

Text of statute as originally enacted

Text of the Deregulation and Contracting Out Act 1994 as in force today (including any amendments) within the United Kingdom, from legislation.gov.uk.

The Deregulation and Contracting Out Act 1994 (c. 40) is an act of the Parliament of the United Kingdom concerning deregulation.

== Provisions ==
It introduced wide-ranging measures with aims including reducing burdens on people in trade created by previous acts such as the Shops Act 1950 (14 Geo. 6. c. 28), changes in transport legislation, changes in utility legislation, and changes in financial services, among others.

It also contained so-called Henry VIII clauses, which meant ministers could amend previous primary legislation through statutory instrument, where they are only be approved or rejected, but not amended.

The act restricted the remit of competition law.

The act was largely repealed and replaced by the Regulatory Reform Act 2001. Part II of the act, which as of July 2023 remains in force, includes a general power to outsource "any function of a Minister or office-holder" if the minister "by order so provides".

== Application ==
The act was used in 2007 to enable graves to be reused.

== Repeals ==
The following acts were entirely repealed by this act:

- Shops Act 1950
- Shops (Airports) Act 1962
- Shops (Early Closing Days) Act 1965

The following acts were partially repealed by the act:

- Merchant Shipping Act 1894 (57 & 58 Vict. c. 60)
- Licensing Act 1964
- Transport Act 1968
- Post Office Act 1969
- Local Government Act 1972
- Employment Agencies Act 1973
- Fair Trading Act 1973
- Local Government (Scotland) Act 1973
- Road Traffic Act 1974
- House of Commons Disqualification Act 1975
- Employment Protection Act 1975
- Industrial Relations (Northern Ireland) Order 1976
- Employment Protection (Consolidation) Act 1978
- Merchant Shipping Act 1979
- Competition Act 1980
- Local Government, Planning and Land Act 1980
- Public Passenger Vehicles Act 1981
- Employment (Miscellaneous Provisions) (Northern Ireland) Order 1981
- Transport Act 1982
- Telecommunications Act 1984
- Road Traffic Regulation Act 1984
- London Regional Transport Act 1984
- Cinemas Act 1985
- Insolvency Act 1985
- Transport Act 1985
- Weights and Measures Act 1985
- Gas Act 1986
- Building Societies Act 1986
- Financial Services Act 1986
- Income and Corporation Taxes Act 1988
- Road Traffic (Consequential Provisions) Act 1988
- Electricity Act 1989
- Employment Act 1989
- Companies Act 1989
- Environmental Protection Act 1990
- Companies (Northern Ireland) Order 1990
- Charities Act 1992
- Electricity (Northern Ireland) Order 1992
- Charities Act 1993
- Trade Union Reform and Employment Rights Act 1993
- Railways Act 1993
- Sunday Trading Act 1994
