= Sunday shopping =

Ability of retailers to operate stores on Sunday

Sunday shopping or Sunday trading is the ability of retailers to operate stores on Sunday, a day that Christian tradition typically recognises as a day of rest, though the rationale for Sunday trade bans often includes secular reasoning. Rules governing shopping hours, such as Sunday shopping, vary around the world but many countries and subnational jurisdictions continue to ban or restrict Sunday shopping. In the United States, rules are enshrined within blue laws.

== Arguments in favour of Sunday shopping ==
The main argument for Sunday shopping relates to consumer welfare. Extending opening hours gives customers more time to do their shopping, and allows individuals to avoid peak shopping hours and having to queue in their free time.

Public authorities hurt consumers by keeping stores from choosing their opening hours according to their market presumptions of consumers' demand. According to the OECD, demand has strongly evolved towards greater flexibility, also due to a greater diversity of working hours in the economy in general, as well as to higher female labour participation in the labour market. Before the liberalisation of shop opening hours in a country like Austria, for example, one could observe an increase in cross-border shopping towards countries with more liberal shopping hours.

It has not been proven that Sunday shopping hurts retailers by leading all of them to open longer hours. Consumer preferences can point in the direction of an extension of shop opening hours in a given area without this need arising in another area. In Spain, for instance, where relatively few restrictions survive, retail stores are open an average of 46 hours per week. In Sweden, 15 years after liberalisation, supply as regards shop opening hours has not yet standardised itself. On the contrary, if 80% of the department stores and supermarkets are open on Sunday, only half of corner shops and 48% of furniture stores are open on this day.

Final extension of opening hours, for each individual firm, will depend on:

- the price consumers are ready to pay for a 24/7 offer of certain products, as prices can rise due to higher wages for Sunday workers;
- the wage that workers will or can demand in order to work additional hours.

An economic model of free competition in prices and opening hours with free entry has shown that restrictions on opening hours aggravate a market failure: entry is excessive and opening hours are underprovided. The model predicts the impact of a liberalization of opening hours: in the short run prices will remain constant, but increase in the long run. Concentration in the retail sector will rise and opening hours will increase in two steps, immediately after deregulation and further over time. Finally, employment in the retail sector increases.

Campaigns for deregulation of Sunday shopping have been put forward mainly by liberal parties. But as long ago as 1899, even US Christian churchgoers were calling for a reform of the laws in the US, because the result was not more people going to Church but "enforced idleness": George Orwell uses the term in Down and out in Paris and London to remark that the worst problem of the underclass is being made to wait.

A deontological argument based on individualist principles holds that business owners should be free to set whatever hours they please and to hire whatever workers are available, able, and willing to work during those hours.

== Arguments against Sunday shopping ==
Arguments in favour of regulation of shop opening hours usually emanate from trade unions and industry federations, as well as socialist and Christian democratic parties. They include:

- protection of workers, vulnerable because of economic conditions and lack of job security, from the need to work also on a day which should be devoted to cultural or familial activities.
- protection of small and medium-sized enterprises, that would face higher competition from larger shops.

The Canadian Labour Code states that workers must get at least one full day (of rest), and that "wherever practicable, Sunday shall be the normal day of rest" [s.173]. In the United States, the eight-hour day and working time standards are enforced by the Fair Labor Standards Act. In the European Union, it is governed by the Working Time Directive.

United States jurist Stephen Johnson Field, with regard to Sunday blue laws, stated:

Its requirement is a cessation from labor. In its enactment, the legislature has given the sanction of law to a rule of conduct, which the entire civilized world recognizes as essential to the physical and moral well-being of society. Upon no subject is there such a concurrence of opinion, among philosophers, moralists and statesmen of all nations, as on the necessity of periodical cessation from labor. One day in seven is the rule, founded in experience and sustained by science. ... The prohibition of secular business on Sunday is advocated on the ground that by it the general welfare is advanced, labor protected, and the moral and physical well-being of society promoted. (Hennington v. Georgia, 163 U.S. 299 [1896])

Erwin Fahlbusch and Geoffrey William Bromiley write that throughout their existence, organizations advocating first-day Sabbatarianism, such as the Lord's Day Alliance in North America and the Lord's Day Observance Society in the British Isles, were supported by labor unions in lobbying "to prevent secular and commercial interests from hampering freedom of worship and from exploiting workers." For example, the United States Congress was supported by the Lord's Day Alliance in securing "a day of rest for city postal clerks whose hours of labor, unlike those of city mail carriers, were largely unregulated." In Canada, the Ligue du Dimanche, a Roman Catholic Sunday league, supported the Lord's Day Act in 1923 and promoted first-day Sabbatarian legislation. Dies Domini, written by Pope John Paul II in 1998, advocates Sunday legislation in that it protects civil servants and workers; the North Dakota Catholic Conference in 2011 likewise maintained that blue laws, in accordance with the Compendium of the Social Doctrine of the Church, "ensure that, for reasons of economic productivity, citizens are not denied time for rest and divine worship." Similarly, Chief Justice Earl Warren, while acknowledging the partial religious origin of blue laws, acknowledged their "secular purpose they served by providing a benefit to workers at the same time that they enhanced labor productivity", declaring: that "the State seeks to set one day apart from all others as a day of rest, repose, recreation and tranquility--a day which all members of the family and community have the opportunity to spend and enjoy together, a day on which there exists relative quiet and disassociation from the everyday intensity of commercial activities, a day on which people may visit friends and relative who are not available during working days."

In some religions, the day of the Sabbath is the seventh day of the week, said to be the day God rested after six days of creation. This is written in the Torah or Old Testament and New Testament (Genesis 2:2-3; Exodus 20:8; Exodus 23:12; Exodus 31:13-17; Deuteronomy 5:12: Hebrews 4:4-8) of the Bible. Specifically, number 3 or 4 in the list of the Ten Commandments is "Remember the Sabbath day, to keep it holy". Not to follow one or many of the Ten Commandments can be considered a sin, or a wrong thing to do. In Judaism, the Sabbath is the seventh day of the Hebrew calendar week, which in English is known as Saturday.

== Sunday shopping by continent ==
=== Europe ===
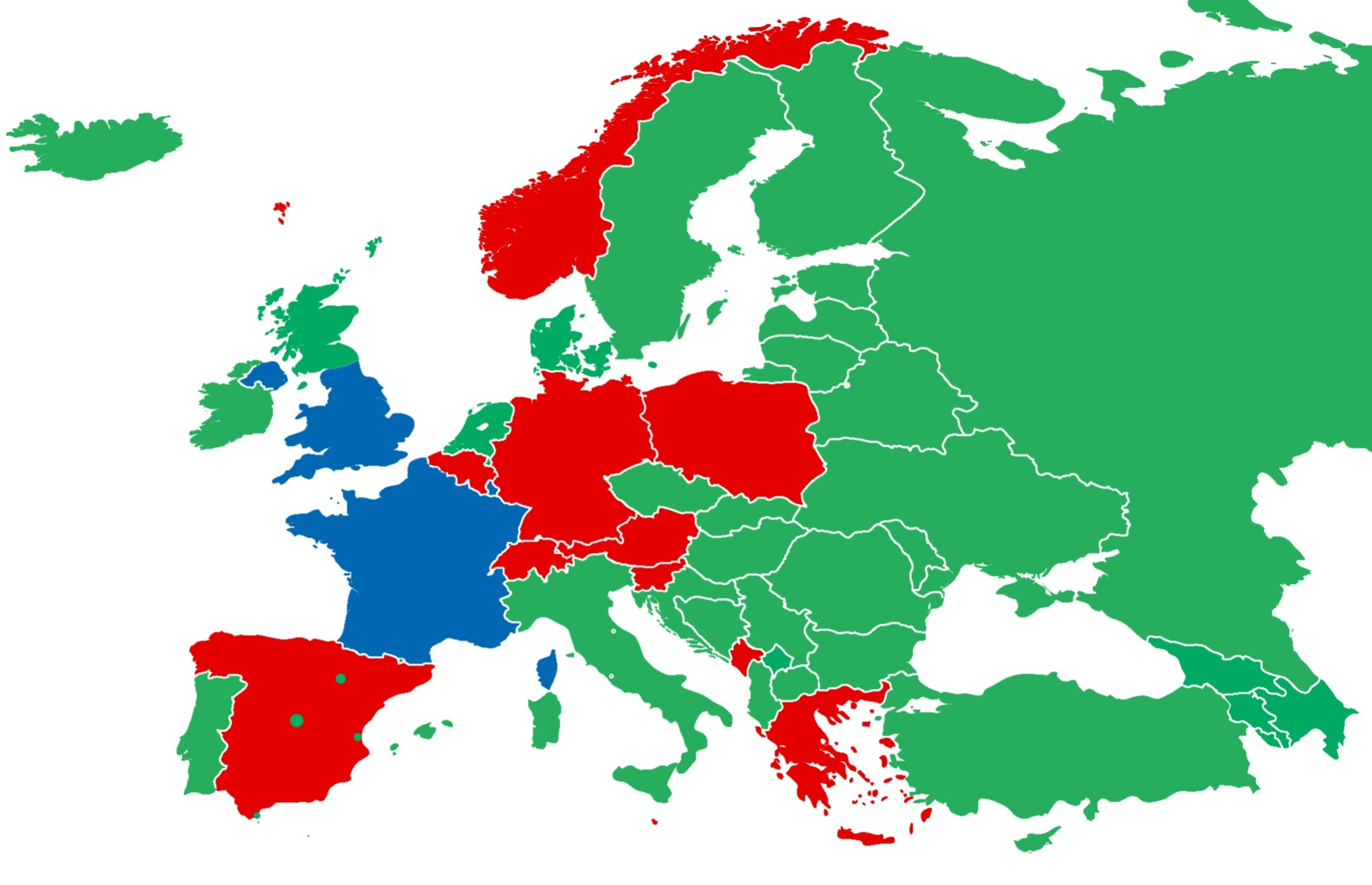
A map of countries where large supermarkets are generally open on non-holiday Sundays: Green: Large supermarkets and shopping centers are generally open on Sundays. Blue: Large supermarkets are allowed to be open for 6 hours or less on Sundays. Red: Large supermarkets are generally closed on Sundays.

==== European Union ====
EU law allows each Member State to set its own policy concerning work on Sundays. Working time in EU member states is addressed in the Working Time Directive: only a weekly rest after six days of work is required. The European Court of Justice in its case law on the subject, built from the 1980s, has not confirmed that Sunday should forcibly be the day of interruption. For the European Commission, "the choice of a closing day of shopping involves historical, cultural, touristic, social and religious considerations within the discretion of each Member State".

The following European Union countries currently allow all shops to open for at least part of every Sunday: Bulgaria, Czech Republic, Denmark, Estonia, Finland, Ireland, Hungary, Italy, Latvia, Lithuania, Netherlands, Portugal, Romania, Slovakia and Sweden.

The following European Union countries currently allow shops to open every Sunday in towns and cities designated as tourist destinations and currently have a very extensive list of them that includes capitals and major cities: Belgium, France and Spain.

In Malta, restrictions were lifted in early 2017, and grocery shops are now allowed to open; other stores have to pay a weekly fee of €700 to be allowed to legally trade on Sundays.

===== Belgium =====
Shops in Belgium may open on a certain number of Sunday afternoons. In March 2006, the number of Sunday opening days increased from three to up to nine. Six of these are determined by the federal government and three may be determined by municipalities. In addition, the criteria which a municipality must meet to be recognised as a "tourist centre" were relaxed.

There are also arrangements for food stores to open on Sunday and wider arrangements for Sunday opening of certain sectors such as furniture stores, DIY stores and garden centres.

===== Czech Republic =====
According to the Czech labour code, where operations so allow, the employer shall set a rest period during the week for all employees to fall on a Sunday, but Sunday shopping itself is not restricted. Although the discussion about restriction is ongoing. Since 2016 there are restrictions for larger shops (200 m^{2} and more) during selected public holidays.

===== Croatia =====
The Roman Catholic Church and some other minor organisations tried to influence the Croatian government to ban Sunday shopping. Although it had worked for some time, the Croatian Constitutional Court declared banning Sunday shopping to be unconstitutional, and on 28 April 2004 issued a decision making it legal. The Church admitted defeat in the battle over closing shops on Sundays. However, on 15 July 2008, the Croatian Parliament, again under pressure from the Catholic Church, passed a new-old law banning Sunday shopping effective 1 January 2009. However, this new ban was also declared to be unconstitutional by the Croatian Constitutional Court on 19 June 2009.

A new temporary ban, introduced between 27 April 2020 and 26 May 2020 related to measures to restrict the spread of COVID-19, was also declared unconstitutional on 14 September 2020. In 2023, a ban on Sunday shopping was enacted. Starting on 1 July 2023, shops are only able to stay open for 16 Sundays a year.

===== Denmark =====
In Denmark, the closing laws restricting retail trade on Sundays have been abolished with effect from 1 October 2012. From then on, retail trade is only restricted on public holidays (New Years Day, Maundy Thursday, Good Friday, Easter Sunday, Easter Monday, Day of Prayer, Ascension Day, Whit Sunday, Whit Monday, Christmas Day and Boxing Day) and on Constitution Day, Christmas Eve and New Year's Eve (on New Year's Eve from 3 pm only). On these days, almost all shops will remain closed. Exempt are bakeries, DIYs, garden centres, filling stations and smaller supermarkets.

Hyper- and supermarkets are typically open on Sundays from 7 am or 8 am until 8 pm or even until 10 pm.

===== Finland =====
As of December 2009, opening hours, including Sunday shopping, for stores with a commercial floor area of less than 400 m^{2} are unregulated. The current law permits even the largest retailing venues to stay open on Sundays from 12 pm to 6 pm, and during the Christmas shopping season, beginning on the third Sunday of November and ending on 23 December, to 9 pm. Sunday shopping was introduced in 1994. On 15 December 2015, the Finnish parliament voted for removing all opening hour restrictions for grocery retailers. The new law came into force on 1 January 2016.

From 5 July 2026 onwards, select Alko locations are also open on Sundays as a result of amendments to the Alcohol Act passed by the Parliament of Finland on 23 June 2026.

===== France =====
French laws about Sunday shopping are complex. Although Sunday shopping is generally not permitted, there are many exceptions such as certain zones and municipalities of the metropolitan areas of Paris, Marseille, and Lille, as well as around 500 cities that were declared as tourist towns, including major cities such as Nice, Le Havre, Vannes and Bordeaux. Most major stores nationwide open every Sunday in December prior to Christmas. Supermarkets (but not hypermarkets) are allowed to open nationwide every Sunday morning until 13:00 for grocery shopping. The relaxation in rules in 2009 allowed all stores to open in tourist areas (before, only sports, toys and cultural shops were allowed). The most visible result is that now clothing stores open every Sunday in places such as Champs Elysees in Paris, La Défense, central Marseille, central Cannes and central Nice.

In 2008, the Swedish furniture chain IKEA was fined €450,000 (over $700,000) for trading on Sundays under the law of 1906. Within the current law, IKEA stores in France are allowed to open on a Sunday. However, only the ones in the Paris metropolitan area actually do so.

===== Germany =====
In Germany, opening hours have long been restricted through the Ladenschlussgesetz. The 1956 law required shops to close for the weekend at 2 pm on a Saturday and 6:30 pm on week-nights, with opening until 6 pm on the first Saturday of the month, in what was known as the Langer Samstag, or "long Saturday". The law was changed, in the face of strong resistance from labour unions, to allow langer Donnerstag ("long Thursday") until 8:30 pm in 1988, and in 1996 opening times were extended to 8 pm from Monday to Friday and 4 pm on Saturday; this was extended to 8 pm on Saturday in 2004.

In 2004, the Federal Constitutional Court ruled against lifting restrictions on Sunday opening, which is still confined to some small bakeries and convenience stores inside railway stations and airports.

In 2006 and 2007, the responsibility for opening hours was transferred to the state governments instead of the federal government, leading to an end to regulated Monday–Saturday opening hours in several states.

Studies on the German deregulation find that, far from causing an increase in consumer prices, the liberalisation lowered prices to some extent, though revenue was unaffected. This decrease in prices was probably driven by productivity increases created by the smoothing of consumer traffic over a longer period of time and the greater ability of consumers to compare prices in a deregulated environment.

However, there is still strong resistance to Sunday shopping from clergy and politicians.

As of 2013, the number of Sunday shopping days per year became regulated by the local government bodies. Berlin, for example, allowed 10 Sundays each year in 2013, reduced to 8 Sundays in 2014, of which two must be during the month before Christmas. In addition, a few supermarkets, located at major subway/railway stations, are allowed to be open for Sunday shopping all year.

Several major railway stations are permitted to operate their shops, such as grocery stores, bookstores, and drug stores, on Sundays.

===== Hungary =====
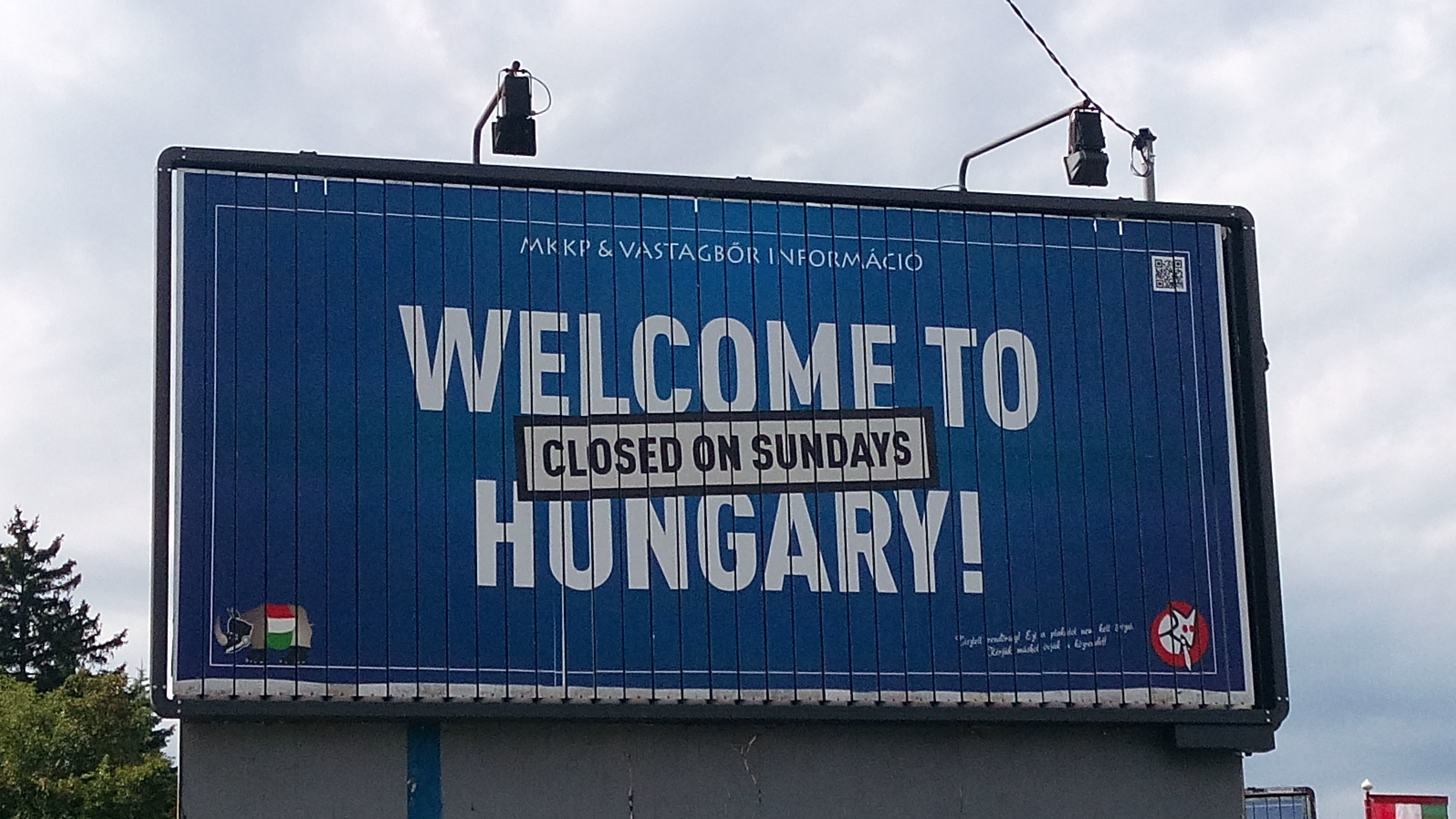
A billboard erected in Budapest's III district by the opposition MKKP-Vastagbőr alignment

Until 15 March 2015, shopping hours in Hungary were unregulated. Most convenience stores and general stores were open on a Sunday, even if only in the mornings. Larger stores (typically those above 5,000 to 15,000 m^{2}, 54,000 to 160,000 sq ft), such as Tesco hypermarkets) were open 24 hours a day, 7 days a week (Hungarian: non-stop or 'éjjel-nappali').

From 15 March 2015, new regulations banned shops from opening on Sundays. The new regulation only allowed trading by shops with an area no greater than 200 square metres (2,200 ft^{2}), and even then only if they are operated by the owner or a close family member related by blood or marriage. The general exception from the law is the four Sundays in Advent and one day that the shops can choose themselves. Lidl chooses to open and close different stores on different Sundays, and lists which will be open in its flysheets.

Due to these rules being unpopular amongst the general public, a referendum was also planned against a Sunday shopping ban. From 17 April 2016, the shopping hours in Hungary are again unregulated. On public holidays (1 January, 15 March, Easter Sunday, Easter Monday, 1 May, Pentecost Sunday and Monday, 20 August, 23 October, 1 November, 25 and 26 December), all shops have to be closed. On Christmas Eve, shops must close by 14:00; while on 31 December, shops can be open until 18:00.

===== Ireland =====
There has been no recent legislation regarding Sunday trading in Ireland, which is regulated by the Shops (Hours of Trading) Act 1938 (Northern Ireland, still being part of the United Kingdom, has different legislation). However, the act itself is largely inoperative – a 1938 Statutory Instrument made the entire State an 'Exempted Area' under the legislation – and as a result most shops and businesses may open whenever they please, including on Sundays and public holidays.

Major retail chains (such as supermarkets, department stores, shops that specialise in DIY, household goods, clothing, etc.) and many independent retailers open their branches throughout Ireland on Sundays, usually from 10:00-19:00 in the larger towns and cities and from 12:00-18:00 in the smaller centres. In Dublin, almost all shops are open on a Sunday.

Shopping centres are open on Sundays with a later opening time (11:00 onwards) and closing time between 18:00-20:00.

Supermarkets, convenience stores and petrol stations are open longer hours than other shops on Sundays, typically from early morning (06:00-10:00) to late evening (20:00-00:00).

Alcohol can only be sold in shops with a special licence – this includes most supermarkets, convenience stores and petrol stations. Alcohol can only be bought between 12:30-22:00 on Sundays (where it is 10:30-22:00 on all other days).

The relaxed nature of the Sunday trading hours in the Republic of Ireland saw in previous years, a large influx of people from Northern Ireland crossing the border to shop, eat and drink as Northern Ireland traditionally had very strict Sunday trading rules – and still does to this day by comparison. For example, pubs in Northern Ireland were not permitted to open on Sundays until 1989. This affected trading in key border towns and cities, especially in County Donegal, County Monaghan, County Cavan and County Louth. Many people from Northern Ireland would spend most of their Sundays across the border, as nearly all of their shops, pubs and restaurants were open.

===== Netherlands =====
For more accurate information, see Shop time Law in the Netherlands from Dutch language Wikipedia.

In The Netherlands, all municipalities have the authority to allow shops to open every Sunday. In major cities (such as such as Amsterdam, Rotterdam, The Hague and Utrecht) most shops are open every Sunday from 1200-1700 or 1800. Nationwide, most supermarkets are open on a Sunday although opening hours vary. In the Christian-dominated Bible Belt area, most shops stay closed on Sundays due to severe pressure from conservative Christians claiming Sunday as a day for worship and rest only. In the past, municipalities would allow shops to open on particular Sundays, often once a month, and these would be known as a koopzondag in Dutch, literally a "Sunday of buying".

===== Poland =====
Currently, there is a ban on trading on Sundays in Poland. Shopping malls, supermarkets and smaller shops are closed. Restaurants, online stores, filling stations (including their shops), some pharmacies, bakeries and post offices remain open. Due to a loophole in the law, some companies decided to extend their offer with additional services, e.g. the "Żabka" chain of stores, which also provide limited postal services. There are exceptions to the trade ban – in 2021, there are 7 shopping Sundays, when shopping malls, supermarkets and other stores are open.

Currently, shopping hours of stores are restricted on 13 public holidays during the year. A bill has been put forward to the Polish parliament by the Solidarność trade union to ban Sunday shopping for larger retail stores all Sundays (apart from 7 Sundays during the year).

As a result of a long public debate in 2007, a law was passed banning trade on public holidays, but not on Sundays. The law entered into force on 26 October 2007, and the first day of the ban was All Saints' Day on 1 November 2007.

The days of restricted shopping are:

- 1 January – New Year,
- 6 January – Feast of the Epiphany (Three Kings' Day)
- Easter Sunday and Easter Monday (moving holiday, two days),
- 1 May – National Day,
- 3 May – Constitution Day,
- Pentecost (Pentecost Sunday, movable holiday),
- Corpus Christi Day (Feast of the Most Holy Body and Blood of the Lord), (movable holiday – always a Thursday)
- 15 August – Assumption of the Blessed Virgin Mary as well as Armed Forces Day,
- 1 November – All Saints' Day,
- 11 November – National Independence Day,
- 24 December – Christmas Eve,
- 25 December and 26 December – Christmas and Boxing Day (St Stephen's Day).

In 2014, the Sejm rejected a civil law bill amending the Labour Code, which prohibits stores closing on Sundays.

Currently stores close earlier on – this being in the interest of workers and not regulated legally:

- Easter Saturday – between opening to 16.00;
- New Year's Eve (St Silvester's Day) – from opening to 18.00.

Employees are forbidden from working on public holidays. Only owners and contract workers can sell during holidays. Petrol stations and pharmacies are exempt from this restriction.

Planned Sunday Shopping Ban

A debate within Poland's parliament is currently discussing the draft bill from the largest trade union, Solidarność, which submitted the bill to parliament to restrict retail trade on Sundays in late 2016. The ban on Sunday trading would affect most retail outlets, with some exceptions as pharmacies, bakeries (until 13.00), flower stores, religious stores and restaurants.

It would be forbidden, according to the bill, to open on all Sundays, apart from the following exceptions:

- Third Sunday of Advent;
- Fourth Sunday of Advent;
- Palm Sunday (last Sunday before Easter)
- last Sunday in January, April, June and August.

Furthermore, store openings would be restricted to opening on the following days to 14.00:

- Easter Saturday
- Christmas Eve

In March 2018 a new Polish law took effect, banning nearly all commerce on Sundays (except for the first and last Sunday of each month in 2018 and the last one in 2019), with supermarkets and most other retailers closed on Sundays for the first time since liberal shopping laws were introduced in the 1990s. The law had been passed by the Law and Justice party, with support of the Catholic Church.

===== Spain =====
Commercial liberalisation during the 1980s allowed Sunday shopping with no restrictions. However, due to pressure from the small independent shops, certain restrictions were introduced in the 1990s.

In June 2000, measures were adopted to liberalise shop opening hours, causing great controversy. The regional governments, the employers' associations representing small and medium-sized retailers and the trade unions opposed the reform. The CEOE employers' confederation and the employers' associations representing large retailers were in favour of the changes.

Currently, each autonomous community may establish its own Sunday opening calendar. The general trend is to allow Sunday opening once a month (usually the first Sunday) and every Sunday during special shopping seasons (including Christmas and sales). Certain sectors (including bars, restaurants, bakeries, pharmacies, fairly big convenience stores, small family-run stores, and bookshops) are granted an exception and may open every Sunday with no restrictions. It is not hard to find a small grocery store open on Sunday in any Spanish town as of 2011.

Religious concerns have been notably absent from the debate. The main bone of contention lies in the competition between big department stores, supermarkets and shopping centres, who push for complete liberalisation, and small family-run shops, who cannot afford extra staff to open on Sundays.

In July 2012 all restrictions were lifted for the whole Madrid metropolitan area and all towns in Madrid province. Ever since shopping malls, supermarkets and shops in city centres of each city have started opening every Sunday.

Shops in towns and areas declared as touristic are allowed to open every Sunday. The list as of 2013 is quite extensive as it includes central Madrid, most of Valencia municipality (including every shopping mall in the city), central Zaragoza, central Palma de Mallorca, most of the Catalan coastal area (except Barcelona), most of the Murcia coastal area, as well as many municipalities in the Madrid metropolitan area, the Andalusia coastal area and the Valencia coastal area. Shopping malls and hypermarkets in these areas usually stay open every Sunday.

In Spain, where relatively few restrictions survive, small retail stores open 46 hours per week on average. This runs counter to the prediction that Sunday shopping hurts retailers by leading all of them to open longer hours.

===== Sweden =====
There is no law restricting the opening hours of shops. The only exception to this rule is the government-owned liquor store monopoly Systembolaget, which is not allowed to open on Sundays, and have to close at 20:00 on weekdays and 15:00 on Saturdays. There is, however a general ban on employing workers between midnight and 5 am and although that ban has many exceptions it usually applies to grocery stores which for that reason cannot stay open after midnight.

In Sweden, 15 years after the liberalisation, supply as regards shop opening hours has not yet standardised itself. On the contrary, if 80% of the department stores and supermarkets are open on Sunday, only half of corner shops and 48% of furniture stores are open on this day. This supports the argument that consumer preferences can point in the direction of an extension of shop opening hours in a given area without this need arising in another area.

==== Other European countries ====
===== Bosnia and Herzegovina =====
The Federation of Bosnia and Herzegovina introduced a ban on Sunday shopping by its internal trade law in force since 14.11.2024. There are exceptions for bakeries, petrol stations and flower shops. In others shops, employees may work on Sunday only on internal duties without opening to the public. However, an exception to the ban may be granted by the federal government to a municipality if the municipal council directs an explicit demand for a derogation to the federal ministry of trade.

===== Norway =====
In Norway only petrol stations, flower nurseries and grocery shops that are smaller than 100 square metres (1,100 sq ft) are allowed to operate on Sundays. For special occasions such as Christmas shopping there are exceptions.

===== Switzerland =====
Federal labour law in Switzerland generally prohibits the employment of staff on Sundays. The law provides for exceptions for very small shops, shops in certain tourist areas as well as shops in major train stations and airports. The latter provision was adopted in a 2005 popular referendum in which it was opposed by labour unions and conservative Christian groups. Moreover, the cantons may allow shops to open on up to four Sundays a year.

Pursuant to an ordinance of the Federal Department of Economic Affairs, the following train stations and airports are allowed to include shops that are open on Sundays: Aarau, Baden, Basel SBB, Bellinzona, Bern, Biel, Brig, Chur, Frauenfeld, Fribourg, Geneva, Lausanne, Lugano, Lucerne, Neuchâtel, Olten, Schaffhausen, Solothurn, St. Gallen, Thun, Uster, Visp, Wil, Winterthur, Zug, Zürich Enge, Zürich Hauptbahnhof, Zürich Oerlikon, Zürich Stadelhofen; Bern Airport, Geneva Cointrin International Airport, Lugano Airport, Sion Airfield, St. Gallen-Altenrhein Airport, Zürich Airport.

===== United Kingdom =====
====== England and Wales ======
By 1994, Sunday trading in England and Wales was not generally permitted. This meant that shops such as department stores and supermarkets were not able to open legally. A number of specialist outlets were able to open legally, including garden centres, small "corner" or family-run shops, and chemists. An earlier attempt by Margaret Thatcher's government to allow Sunday shopping in 1986 was defeated in Parliament, with opposition coming from Conservative MPs who saw it as a threat to family life and church attendance, and Labour MPs who were concerned about workers' rights. This led to the formation of the Keep Sunday Special campaign, backed by church groups and USDAW, the trade union representing shop workers.

Several large retailers challenged the legal ruling in force, with some opening on Sundays from Christmas 1991 onwards This led to the Sunday Trading Act 1994 permitted "large shops" – those with a "relevant floor area" in excess of 280 m^{2} (3,000 ft^{2}) – to open for up to six hours on Sunday between the hours of 10 am and 6 pm. Small shops, those with an area of below 280 m^{2}, are free to set their own Sunday trading times.

However, some large shops, such as off-licences, service stations and garages, are exempt from the restrictions. Christmas Day and Easter Sunday have been excluded as trading days. This applies even to garden centres, which earlier had been trading over Easter, but not to small shops (those with an area of below 280 square metres). In 2006, the government considered further relaxation of the permitted hours of business but decided that there was no consensus for change, although a popular poll indicated differently. Some local councils require a trader to give notice before trading on Sundays, but they cannot refuse permission; so most councils no longer even require notice.

Since the 1994 act allowed stores to open, stores seem to keep to it meticulously, perhaps more so than before when they were flagrantly breaching the law by opening at all. However, there is a tendency to open half an hour earlier but not allow sales before the allotted time, to allow people to "browse" and thus effectively extend the opening hours of the store without breaking the law. For example, in Birmingham in 2005 several stores opened seven hours, 10.30 am to 5.30 pm, but would not have been able to sell throughout that time without breaking the law.

In 2012, emergency legislation was passed stipulating that Sunday Trading Laws (Sunday Trading Act 1994) would be suspended by the government on eight weekends from 22 July during the Olympics and Paralympics.

In 2014, Philip Davies MP (Conservative, Shipley) called for a permanent abolition of the restrictions.

In July 2015, it was proposed that Sunday trading hours should become a devolved issue for local government. The Enterprise Bill 2015–16 introduced in September 2015 included a provision for major towns and cities to decide how long shops could open for on Sundays. However, the bill's proposals with regard to Sunday trading were defeated in the House of Commons in March 2016 and the government indicated that it had no intention to reintroduce the measure.

====== Scotland ======
Sunday trading laws in Scotland are devolved to the Scottish Parliament.

Scotland has never had any general legislation regarding Sunday trading. However, the Sunday Working (Scotland) Act 2003 prohibits shops from compelling their workers to work on Sunday. This lack of restriction allows opening hours of larger shops to be longer than in England and Wales and Northern Ireland, and many large supermarkets remain open seven days a week with little or no adjustment of opening hours at the weekend. There is no equivalent to the legal restriction on Easter Sunday opening that exists in England and Wales, but opening on Christmas Day is very unusual.

Actual practice varies across the country according to local custom and local council regulation. In the Western Isles, where the Free Church of Scotland has a considerable following, there is virtually no commercial activity on Sundays until 6:45 am on Monday. In tourist and holiday areas there is typically an increase in the number of shops opening late and on Sundays during their particular tourist seasons.

Former restrictions include:

- Until 1994 barbers and hairdressers in Scotland were prohibited by s.67 of the Shops Act 1950 from carrying out their business on a Sunday.
- Until 2009 alcohol could not be sold until 12:30 pm. This has now changed to 10 am, the same as every other day of the week.

====== Northern Ireland ======
In Northern Ireland, Sunday trading is regulated under the Sunday Trading (Northern Ireland) Order 1997. Opening hours are more limited for larger stores, or a floor area exceeding 280 square metres (3,014 sq ft). Normally, a large shop may trade only between the hours of 1 p.m. to 6 p.m. on Sundays. This was to create a greater gap between Sunday services and the opening of large shops, in response to objections from churches, especially the Protestant churches, which have more influence than in the rest of the UK. Large shops within holiday resorts (designated by the district council) may opt for unrestricted trading hours on up to 18 Sundays (but not on Easter Day) per calendar year between 1 March and 30 September. Shop owners in violation of the Sunday trading law may be fined up to £50,000.

Pubs in Northern Ireland were not allowed to open on Sundays until 1989.

=== Asia ===
==== China ====
Very little regulation applies to Sunday trading. The majority of stores maintain similar opening hours as on a normal business day, while others have extended hours to accommodate the weekend shopping wave.

==== Hong Kong ====
While Sunday is a holiday or day of rest, shopping hours are not regulated and decided wholly by store owners. Most of the shops open on Sunday from 10 am or 11 am to 10 pm or 11 pm.

==== Philippines ====
Sunday shopping is generally allowed in the predominantly Catholic Philippines, where families go out to major retailers, and even hear Mass at purpose-built mall chapels. Store hours on Sundays are usually the same as on Mondays to Thursdays, which tend to close earlier than on Fridays and Saturdays. During Holy Week, the three days preceding Easter Sunday see stores closed or operating on shorter hours, as with many television and radio stations. All these completely reopen to full hours on Easter Sunday itself.

=== Africa ===
==== South Africa ====
There are no specific restrictions on Sunday shopping in South Africa, but it tends to be limited to supermarkets and retail businesses in large shopping malls. This is likely a result of the Basic Conditions of Employment Act, which requires that workers are paid 1.5 times the normal rate on a Sunday. In addition, provincial liquor licensing usually restricts the sale of alcohol on a Sunday.

=== North America ===
==== Canada ====
In Canada, each province and territory has its own legislation regarding employment standards and Sunday shopping.

In 1982, the Supreme Court of Canada upheld the Lord's Day Act. However, at that time, only the Canadian Bill of Rights existed. That document only protected existing Canadian rights. As a result, the Court noted that Canada was an overwhelmingly Christian country that had accepted Sunday closing laws for years. The Court determined that the Lord's Day Act did not force people to practice Christianity or stop practising their own religion.

However, later that year, the Canadian Charter of Rights and Freedoms was introduced, ensuring freedom of conscience and religion, regardless of existing federal or provincial laws. On 24 April 1985, the Supreme Court of Canada ruled that the Lord's Day Act violated Canadians' freedom of religion. The 1985 ruling examined the original purpose of the act. It found that the Christian value of keeping Sunday holy had been incorporated into a law that affected all Canadians, Christian or not. This law—the Lord's Day Act—prevented non-Christians from performing otherwise legal activities on Sundays. This was inconsistent with the Canadian charter.

===== Alberta =====
In 1984, the province of Alberta granted municipalities the right to allow, or prohibit, retail stores opening on Sundays. By the end of 1984, some stores in Edmonton were open on Sundays, but the controversy over Sunday openings continued for a number of years. In some communities in Alberta, the question was still being debated in 1990.

===== Nova Scotia =====
Until October 4, 2006, Nova Scotia was the last province in Canada that prohibited year-round Sunday shopping. An experiment with the practice was held in 2003 and in 2004 a binding plebiscite was held which resulted in 45% of voters in favour of Sunday shopping and 55% voting against the practice. The Retail Business Uniform Closing Day Act allowed some stores, such as video rental outlets, pharmacies and book stores, to open on Sundays, but department stores had to remain closed. The restrictions were based on the area of a store and its form of business.

By mid-2006, several grocers in Nova Scotia including Pete's Frootique and larger chains such as Atlantic Superstore and Sobeys circumvented the law by reconfiguring their stores on Sundays into separate businesses, each of which was small enough in area to be exempt from the Retail Business Uniform Closing Day Act. For example, a Halifax-area Sobeys location was known as the "Sobeys Queen Street Mall" and housed the Sobeys Retail Fish Store Ltd., Sobeys Fruit Stand Ltd., Sobeys Bakery and Bulk Food Ltd. and eight other separate "businesses".

On June 23, 2006, the Premier of Nova Scotia, Rodney MacDonald, announced new limits on Sunday shopping as a means to honour the wishes of voters in the 2004 plebiscite. The proposed new regulations prohibited grocers and other retailers from opening if they reconfigured their businesses as separate operating units after 1 June 2006. The premier also announced that he would seek the views of the public in a new plebiscite to coincide with municipal elections scheduled for 2008.

On July 2, 2006, members of the Halifax Regional Police entered the Barrington Street Atlantic Superstore in Halifax with measuring tapes and began an investigation to see if the grocer was in compliance with the Retail Business Uniform Closing Day Act. Three days later, on July 5, 2006, Sobeys filed a motion in the Supreme Court of Nova Scotia to have the Retail Business Uniform Closing Day Act and the new regulations announced by Premier MacDonald to be declared invalid. Sobeys was joined by Atlantic Superstore in the case, who entered by seeking intervener status.

Sobeys felt that the law was unjust since it permitted competitors such as Pete's Frootique in Bedford to open Sundays. Pete's Frootique had taken the provincial government to court seven years earlier and won the right to open on Sundays with its separate operating divisions, thus it was "grandfathered" in the new regulations announced by Premier MacDonald.

On 4 October 2006, the Supreme Court of Nova Scotia ruled that the Government of Nova Scotia had overstepped its authority by forcing the supermarkets to close. In response, Premier Rodney MacDonald announced that effective Sunday, October 8, Sunday shopping would be an unrestricted option open to all retail stores, and can be open on all holidays except Remembrance Day, for which there was a separate provincial law forcing all businesses to close. Since then, Sunday shopping has been adopted throughout the province.

===== Ontario =====
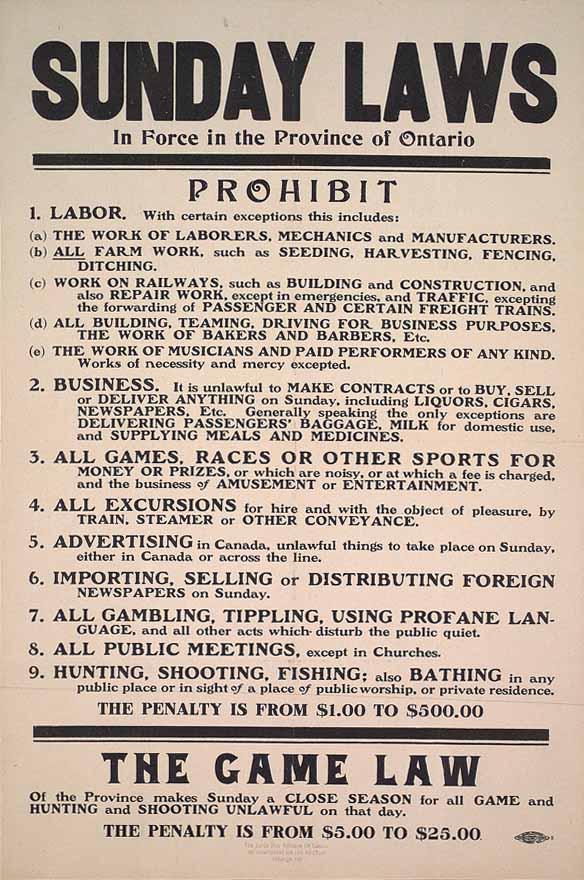
Sunday Laws in Ontario, 1911

After the demise of the Lord's Day Act, the Retail Business Holidays Act of Ontario still prohibited most stores from opening on Sundays. However, there were exceptions to these rules (for example, gas stations, convenience stores, tourist areas). Many store owners who opposed the law decided to open their stores on Sundays, knowing they were breaking the law. Some, such as Marc Emery, were jailed for doing so.

In June 1990, the Supreme Court of Ontario found the act to be unconstitutional. As a result, Ontario had nine months of open-wide Sunday shopping, until the Ontario Court of Appeal's reversal of the decision in March 1991.

However, public opposition to Sunday closing continued to rise. Bowing to public pressure, the Rae government amended the Retail Business Holidays Act in June 1992 to permit Sunday shopping in Ontario.

===== Other Canadian provinces =====
Several other provinces have restrictions of some degree on Sunday shopping.

In Prince Edward Island, it is only permitted after 12 noon from the Sunday before Victoria Day until Christmas Eve. This was repealed on November 25, 2010, allowing stores to open at any time on Sunday year-round.

In Manitoba, it is up to each municipality for approval. As of January 2021, Sunday shopping is permitted without restrictions.

In New Brunswick, In November 1991, the decisions require dual approval from municipal and provincial officials (although that is in the process of being changed), otherwise it is only permitted from August to the first Sunday in January. Some cities restrict Sunday hours to 12:00 pm to 5:00 pm. Fredericton has recently (as of August 12, 2013) passed a law revoking any restrictions on Sunday shopping hours.

In the 1990s, Quebec allowed wide-open shopping from 8:00 am until 5:00 pm the exception being grocery stores that could remain open later, but they could not have more than four employees on staff after 5:00 pm. The law was changed in the 2000s to allow supermarkets to remain open until 8:00 pm with an unlimited number of employees.

Other provinces allow wide-open shopping all day on most Sundays (except when it falls on a holiday or when objected by municipalities).

Newfoundland and Labrador lifted restrictions on retail stores operating on Sundays starting on January 1, 1998.

==== United States ====
Many states in the United States have reduced hours of operation on Sundays in some form or another. A few local municipalities still prohibit Sunday shopping. Some local jurisdictions have regulations on if and when bars and restaurants may be open on Sundays.

===== New Jersey =====
One of the last major areas to completely prohibit Sunday shopping is Bergen County, New Jersey. This area contains one of the largest and most popular commercial shopping cores of the New York metropolitan area (for example, one of four local IKEA stores is found here, the store is the only one in the United States to be closed on Sunday, and is also home to four large shopping malls). Ironically, the area is not considered to be particularly very religious compared to the U.S. population at large, and it also has significant Jewish and Muslim populations whose observant members would not be celebrating the Sabbath on Sunday. Attempts to repeal the law have failed as many locals either like to keep the law on the books as a protest against the growing trend of increased Sunday shopping activity in American society or fear the potential increase of Sunday traffic on major local roads such as Route 4 or Route 17. Some local Orthodox Jews who are off both days of the weekend have complained about the law because it limits their ability to get shopping done on the weekend without having to travel to a neighboring county as religious beliefs prohibit shopping on Friday night or on Saturday before nightfall, which in the summer can be right before most department stores and malls close. Governor Chris Christie made an unsuccessful attempt in 2010 to remove the law bringing extra tax revenue for the state budget, then in 2012, he suspended the law after Hurricane Sandy which lasted for one Sunday, but went back into effect later.

===== North Dakota =====
North Dakota had one of the toughest blue laws in the United States until 2019, which required all stores to be closed from midnight to noon on Sundays. Prior to 1991, the law was more restrictive, with all sales being prohibited on a Sunday.

===== Georgia and Oklahoma =====
Georgia and Oklahoma require liquor stores to be closed on Sundays, as did Minnesota until 2017. However, alcohol can still be served in restaurants and bars on Sunday unless local (county or city) ordinances prohibit or restrict their doing so. For instance, in Georgia, most of the Metro Atlanta area counties serve alcohol at restaurants and bars, but the establishments must have a certain amount of food sales in order to be opened and serve alcohol on Sundays. Yet many of Georgia's rural counties and some outer metropolitan Atlanta counties, such as Barrow County, remain completely dry on Sundays. In those counties on Sundays, bars are closed, and restaurants are allowed to operate but are prohibited from serving alcohol. There was discussion in the Georgia legislature in the late 2000s (decade) to repeal the state's blue laws regarding Sunday retail alcohol sales in a measure to increase tax revenue. However, then-Governor Sonny Perdue said that he would not sign the bills repealing the laws if they passed in Georgia's state house and senate. In Oklahoma, it is illegal to sell packaged liquor (off-premises sales) on Sundays, as well as Memorial Day, Independence Day, Labor Day, Thanksgiving Day and Christmas Day.

===== Virginia =====
Virginia prohibits hard liquor sales except through stores operated by its state-owned Alcoholic Beverage Commission (ABC), which sets hours for its own stores and currently dictates that all or almost all of its establishments are to remain closed on Sundays. In this way, the combination of state-enforced monopoly and state-sanctioned authority to set hours results in a de facto prohibition on Sunday hard liquor sales in Virginia. Although grocery and convenience stores may sell beer and wine containing 14% or less alcohol by volume, state law permits localities to prohibit Sunday sales of these alcoholic beverages as well.

===== North Carolina =====
North Carolina only permits hard liquor to be sold through state-controlled stores that are almost all closed on Sundays. Beer and wine may be sold in grocery and convenience stores, but only after noon on Sunday.

===== District of Columbia =====
The District of Columbia prohibits sales of alcohol by liquor stores on Sundays. Grocery stores and retailers selling alcohol to be consumed on their premises are not subject to this prohibition.

===== Others =====
Some states, including Indiana and Pennsylvania, also prohibit car dealerships from selling vehicles on Sunday.

=== South America ===
Sunday shopping is allowed in every country. Most shopping malls and supermarkets stay open every Sunday in Argentina, Chile, Brazil, Uruguay, Peru, Ecuador, Colombia etc.

Sunday opening became widespread in most of South America by the early 1980s.

=== Oceania ===
==== Australia ====
1982 and 1984 ABC news reports of Australian hardware store owner Frank Penhalluriack's attempt to trade on Sunday

The situation in Australia is not uniform, as each of its states and territories has its own laws. Historically, shops closed for the weekend on Saturday afternoons, with South Australia being the first state to allow Saturday afternoon opening. Most states now allow Sunday opening, with unregulated trading in NSW, Victoria, Tasmania, the ACT and the Northern Territory.

Certain shops are generally made exempt, or partially exempt, from trading hours laws (including restrictions on Sunday trading) under certain conditions. Shops that are not exempt from trading hours restrictions are referred to as "general" or "non-exempt" shops. Although these vary from state to state, generally speaking, exemptions can be based on one or more of the following:

- a maximum number of employees employed by the shop, or staffed at any one time (for example, New South Wales exempts shops with no more than four staff at any one time),
- by the floor size of the shop (for example, South Australia exempts shops with a floor space of less than 200m^{2}),
- by the type of goods the shop sells – for example, hardware and furniture shops are often partially exempted, while shops such as newsagents, flowers, certain food shops (other than supermarkets) and chemists are often fully exempt, or
- by its location, often in significant tourist areas – either by inclusion, or by exclusion – i.e. declaring that trading hours outside of designated areas are deregulated.

===== New South Wales =====
Trading hours in New South Wales are largely deregulated following the enactment of the Shop Trading Act 2008, which commenced operation on 1 July 2008.

Under the current act, Sunday trading is unrestricted; however, retail shops must close on Good Friday, Easter Sunday, Christmas Day, Boxing Day, and until 1 pm on ANZAC Day, unless exempted. Exemptions are granted generally by virtue of small size, location, types of goods traded; other shops must apply for an exemption to trade on a restricted day through the Department of Industrial Relations.

Prior to these laws, shops not generally exempted were required to apply to trade on Sunday and other public holidays, to be granted if the shop was "serving predominantly the tourist or visitor trade, significant public demand or operates in a holiday resort area". In practice however, Sunday trading remained commonplace.

===== Victoria =====
Trading hours are deregulated in Victoria; shopping is allowed at any time, except for Anzac Day morning (before 1 pm), Good Friday and Christmas Day. Victoria is also famous for first introducing round-the-clock 36-hour shopping before Christmas, even if this fell on a Sunday. In Victoria Boxing Day is also one of the busiest days of the shopping year, and many stores are open through extended hours even if it falls on a Sunday. Victoria is one of only a select number of states which feature 24-hour Kmart stores, open every day of the year except for Christmas Day.

===== Queensland =====
Non-exempt shops in Queensland are permitted to trade from 9 am to 6 pm and from 8:30 am to 5:30 pm in certain coastal towns north of Brisbane. Permission for regional cities to trade on Sundays is made by the local council that governs it.

===== South Australia =====
South Australia introduced Sunday trading for non-exempt shops in 2003. Non-exempt shops are restricted to opening between 9 am and 5 pm in the Adelaide metropolitan area. Trading hours are also restricted in a number of "Proclaimed Shopping Districts" in country South Australia, where non-exempt shops must remain closed on Sunday. Local governments can apply to have their Proclaimed Shopping District altered or abolished.

===== Western Australia =====
The Retail Trading Hours Act 1987 applies to retail shops in Western Australia south of the 26th parallel. It sets out the trading hours and rules covering various categories of retail outlets. The trading hours of restaurants, cafes and takeaway food shops are not covered by the Act.

General retail shops are permitted to trade in the Perth metropolitan area between 8:00 am and 9:00 pm Monday to Friday, 8:00 am to 5:00 pm on Saturday, 11:00 am to 5:00 pm Sunday and public holidays. General retail shops are required to be closed on Christmas Day, Good Friday and ANZAC Day.

===== Tasmania =====
Trading hours in Tasmania have been deregulated since 1 December 2002, with shops only being required to close on Christmas Day, Good Friday, and Anzac Day morning. Previously, businesses with more than 250 employees were not permitted to trade on Sundays. This restriction can be gazetted by the relevant minister for these shops, but only on the advice of a local council, and only after a referendum of voters in that local government area is carried.

===== Australian Capital Territory =====
Trading hours in the Australian Capital Territory (ACT) have been deregulated since the repeal of the Trading Hours Act 1996 on 29 May 1997. The 1996 act restricted trading of "large supermarkets" to between 7 am and 5 pm on Sundays, provided other trading hours were not gazetted by the relevant minister. Large supermarkets were those with greater than 400m^{2} in floor area, and located in the City or the Belconnen, Woden and Tuggeranong Town Centres.

==== New Zealand ====
New Zealand, which banned trading on Saturday and Sunday completely between 1945 and 1980, liberalised shopping hours in 1990. Shops may open at any time, with the exception of all-day Good Friday, Easter Sunday, and Christmas Day, and before 1 pm on Anzac Day. Certain types of shops, such as petrol stations and dairies, are specifically excluded from this restriction and are still allowed to trade on these days.

== See also ==
- Keep Sunday Special – a campaign against extended Sunday trading in England and Wales
- Lord's Day Observance Society
- Sunday Trading Act 1994 (England and Wales)
- Sabbath desecration
