= Shops Act 1950 =

Act of the Parliament of the United Kingdom

Shops Act 1950 (Note: Section 77(1).)
- Act of Parliament
- Parliament of the United Kingdom
- Long title: An Act to consolidate the Shops Acts, 1912 to 1938, and certain other enactments relating to shops.
- Citation: 14 Geo. 6. c. 28
- Territorial extent: England and Wales; Scotland; (Note: Section 77(2).)

Dates
- Royal assent: 28 July 1950
- Commencement: 1 October 1950 (Note: Section 77(3).)
- Repealed: 1 December 1994 (Note: The Deregulation and Contracting Out Act 1994 (Commencement No. 1) Order 1994 (SI 1994/3037).)
Other legislation
Repeals/revokes	Shops Act 1912; Shops Act 1913; Shops (Hours of Closing) Act 1928; Hairdressers' and Barbers' Shops (Sunday Closing) Act 1930; Shops Act 1934; Shops Act 1936; Retail Meat Dealers' Shops (Sunday Closing) Act 1936; Shops (Sunday Trading Restriction) Act 1936
Amended by	Shops (Airports) Act 1962; Offices, Shops and Railway Premises Act 1963; Shops (Early Closing Days) Act 1965; Statute Law (Repeals) Act 1969; Statute Law (Repeals) Act 1974; Sunday Trading Act 1994
Repealed by	Deregulation and Contracting Out Act 1994

Status: Repealed

Text of statute as originally enacted

The Shops Act 1950 (14 Geo. 6. c. 28) was an act of the Parliament of the United Kingdom which was repealed on 1 December 1994 by the Deregulation and Contracting Out Act 1994. The introductory text describes it as "An Act to consolidate the Shops Acts, 1912 to 1938, and certain other enactments relating to shops.".

The act dealt with hours of closing (not hours of opening), half-day holidays, employment conditions and with Sunday trading in England and Wales. The act provided a right to suitable seating for female workers.

== Extent ==
The act did not extend to Northern Ireland.

Part IV of the act (Sunday closing) did not extend to Scotland.

== Exemptions ==
Shops (Airports) Act 1962 (Note: Section 2(1).)
- Act of Parliament
- Parliament of the United Kingdom
- Long title: An Act to exempt shops at certain airports, and the carrying on of any retail trade or business in connection with such shops, from the provisions of Part I of the Shops Act, 1950; and for purposes connected therewith.
- Citation: 10 & 11 Eliz. 2. c. 35
- Territorial extent: England and Wales; Scotland; (Note: Section 2(2).)

Dates
- Royal assent: 19 July 1962
- Commencement: 19 July 1962 (Note: The Acts of Parliament (Commencement) Act 1793.)
- Repealed: 1 December 1994
Other legislation
Amends	Shops Act 1950
Amended by	Transfer of Functions (Civil Aviation) Order 1966; Sunday Trading Act 1994
Repealed by	Deregulation and Contracting Out Act 1994

Status: Repealed

Text of statute as originally enacted

The Shops (Airports) Act 1962 (10 & 11 Eliz. 2. c. 35) was an act of Parliament which made exemptions of the Shops Act 1950 for traders conducting business in airports. These exemptions applied to shops that were in airports, other than those not ordinarily accessible by those travelling to or from the airport by air, and exempts them from the provisions in part 1 of the Shops Act 1950 regarding closing times. The Act was later repealed by the Deregulation and Contracting Out Act 1994 alongside the Shops Act 1950.

== Repeals ==
The following Acts were entirely repealed by this Act:

- Shops Act 1912
- Shops Act 1913
- Shops (Hours of Closing) Act 1928
- Hairdressers' and Barbers' Shops (Sunday Closing) Act 1930
- Shops Act 1934
- Shops Act 1936
- Retail Meat Dealers' Shops (Sunday Closing) Act 1936
- Shops (Sunday Trading Restriction) Act 1936

The following Acts were partially repealed by this Act:

- Factories Act 1937 (in section ninety-eight, subsection (6))
- Young Persons (Employment) Act 1938 (Sections eight, eleven, twelve and thirteen)
- National Health Service Act 1946 (In the Tenth Schedule, the amendments of the Shops (Sunday Trading Restriction) Act 1936)
