= Religious economy =

Religious economy may refer to:

- Theory of religious economy, the interpretation of religious persons and organizations interacting within a market framework of competing groups and ideologies.

It could also refer to:

- Buddhist economics, a spiritual and philosophical approach to the study of economics
- Cultural economics, the branch of economics that studies the relation of culture to economic outcomes
- Christian finance, ethical finance following Christian ethics
- Economic imperialism (economics)
- Economics of religion, the application of economic theory and methods to explain the religious behaviour of individuals and groups
- Female labor force in the Muslim world
- Institutional economics, the study of role of institutions and evolutionary processes in shaping economic behaviour
- Islamic economics
- Jewish business ethics, ethical issues that arise in a business environment using Jewish ethics
- New institutional economics, the study of social and legal norms and rules that underlie economic activity
- Religion and business
- Sociology of religion, the study of the beliefs, practices, and organizational forms of religion using the methods of sociology
- Wealth and religion
