= Estate of Thornton v. Caldor, Inc. =

- Supreme Court of the United States

Argued November 7, 1984 Decided June 26, 1985
- Full case name: Estate of Thornton v. Caldor, Inc.
- Citations: 472 U.S. 703 (more) 105 S. Ct. 2914; 86 L. Ed. 2d 557; 1985 U.S. LEXIS 101

Case history
- Prior: 191 Conn. 336, 464 A.2d 785 (1983)

Holding
- A state statute providing employees with an absolute right not to work on their chosen Sabbath violates the Establishment Clause of the First Amendment.

Court membership
- Chief Justice Warren E. Burger Associate Justices William J. Brennan Jr. · Byron White; Thurgood Marshall · Harry Blackmun; Lewis F. Powell Jr. · William Rehnquist; John P. Stevens · Sandra Day O'Connor

Case opinions
- Majority: Burger, joined by Brennan, White, Marshall, Blackmun, Powell, Stevens, O'Connor
- Concurrence: O'Connor, joined by Marshall
- Dissent: Rehnquist (without opinion)

Laws applied
- U.S. Const. amend. I

Estate of Thornton v. Caldor, Inc., 472 U.S. 703 (1985), was a United States Supreme Court case in which the Court held that a state statute providing employees with an absolute right not to work on their chosen Sabbath violates the Establishment Clause of the First Amendment.

== Background ==
The case concerned the constitutionality of a Connecticut state statute, which provided, "[n]o person who states that a particular day of the week is observed as his Sabbath may be required by his employer to work on such day. An employee's refusal to work on his Sabbath shall not constitute grounds for his dismissal."

Donald E. Thornton began working as a store department manager for Caldor, Inc., a chain of retail stores, in 1975. At that time, Connecticut's blue laws required retail stores to close on Sunday, but the law was changed in 1977. As a result, Caldor required Thornton to work one Sunday out of each four. Thornton complied for several months but in 1978, he advised Caldor that he observed Sunday as his Sabbath and would no longer work on Sundays. Caldor told Thornton that it could not accommodate his unwillingness to work Sundays in his current job. It offered either to transfer him to a comparable management job at a store in Massachusetts that was closed on Sunday, or to transfer him to a non-management position in his current store at a lower salary. Although Thornton did not accept either suggestion, in 1980 Caldor transferred Thornton to a clerical position that was not assigned to work Sundays.

Thornton resigned and filed a complaint with a Connecticut state agency, asserting that Caldor had illegally discharged him for refusing to work on his Sabbath. Caldor responded that Thornton had not been "discharged" for purposes of the statute, and also contended that the statute was unconstitutional under the religion clauses of the United States and Connecticut Constitutions.

The agency sided with Thornton, ordering Caldor to reinstate Thornton to his prior position with back pay and benefits, and the Connecticut Superior Court affirmed the agency's determination. On appeal, however, the Connecticut Supreme Court reversed, holding that because the statute lacked a "clear secular purpose" and its "primary effect" was to confer a religious benefit, it was unconstitutional under the Establishment Clause of the First Amendment.

Thornton sought review by the United States Supreme Court, which granted certiorari. While the case was pending, Thornton died, and his estate was substituted as a party. At argument, Thornton's estate was represented by Nathan Lewin, and Caldor by Paul Gewirtz.

== Opinion ==
Chief Justice Burger wrote the opinion of the Court, which was joined by seven other Justices. The Court affirmed the Connecticut Supreme Court's holding that the statute in question violated the First Amendment. In a relatively brief opinion, Burger explained that it was unconstitutional under the Establishment Clause for a state to require employers to relieve an employee of work on his or her Sabbath, as "an absolute and unqualified right" that applied "no matter what burden or inconvenience this imposes on the employer or fellow workers." The Court concluded that "[t]his unyielding weighting in favor of Sabbath observers over all other interests contravenes a fundamental purpose of the Religion Clauses."

=== Concurring opinion ===
Justice O'Connor filed a three-paragraph concurring opinion, joined by Justice Marshall emphasizing that the Court's ruling was based on the "special and absolute protection" that the Connecticut statute provided to Sabbath observers. However, she concluded that more broadly worded religious accommodation requirements, such as those contained in the Civil Rights Act of 1964, would not be similarly invalid. In O'Connor's view, a statute requiring "reasonable rather than absolute accommodation" and applying to all religious beliefs and practices "serves the valid secular purpose of securing employment opportunity to all groups in our pluralistic society."

=== Dissent ===
Justice Rehnquist dissented from the Court's judgment, but did not write an opinion.

== See also ==
- List of United States Supreme Court cases, volume 472
- Blue laws in the United States had earlier been upheld by the court in 1961 cases Gallagher v. Crown Kosher Super Market of Massachusetts, Inc., McGowan v. Maryland, compelling business to close on Sundays.
- In the 1977 case Trans World Airlines, Inc. v. Hardison, keepers of seventh-day sabbath were denied equal employment opportunity protection of the Civil Rights Act of 1964, Title VII, which was challenged again in 2022's Groff v. DeJoy.
