= Economics of religion =

The economics of religion concerns both the application of the techniques of economics to the study of religion and the relationship between economic and religious behaviours. Contemporary writers on the subject trace it back to Adam Smith (1776).

Empirical work examines the causal influence of religion in microeconomics to explain individual behaviour and in the macroeconomic determinants of economic growth. Religious economics (or theological economics) is a related subject sometimes overlapping or conflated with the economics of religion.

== History ==
Adam Smith laid a foundation for economic analysis for religion in The Wealth of Nations (1776), stating that religious organisations are subject to market forces, incentive and competition problems like any other sector of the economy. Max Weber later identified a relationship between religion and economic behaviour, attributing in 1905 the modern advent of capitalism to the Protestant reformation.

== Religion and individual behaviour ==
Research highlights the importance of religious orthodoxy on moral behaviours and versions of the Golden Rule "Do unto others as you would have others do unto you" are common to most major religions. Others argue it promotes cooperation and trust within culturally defined groups or clubs. Studies compare the complementary effects of religious values such as charity, forgiveness, honesty and tolerance and religious social groups where membership instils favouritism or discrimination towards in or outgroup members.

=== Believing ===
The believing channel of religion behaviours concerns costly effort concerned with divine reputation. Azzi and Ehrenberg (1975) propose individuals allocate time and money to secular and religious institutions to maximise utility in this life and the afterlife. The colonisation of religious minds by the morally concerned supernatural or "Big Gods" diffused behaviours derived from moral instruction.

=== Belonging ===
The belonging approach to religion considers the social notion of between and within religious groups. Iannaconne (1998) assigns religion as a 'club good' from a rational choice perspective where costly rituals exclude free-riders from in-group benefits. Field experiments also evidence religious people are more trusting and cooperative with fellow religious adherents. Many experimental studies suggest group belonging has a greater influence on behaviour than belief orthodoxy. As Darwin (1874) among others argue, the promotion of cooperative in-group behaviours is not unique to religious networks.

== Experimental economics of religion ==
Experimental methods can be applied to isolate the effect of religion on behaviour patterns and to distinguish between believing versus belonging channels. Experimental methods are useful in the economics of religion to standardise measurement and identify causal effect. Methods include looking at religion in various games – Prisoner's dilemma, public goods game, ultimatum game, dictator game and parametric choice. Generally, as Hoffman's (2011) survey shows, few statistically significant results have been identified which commentators attribute to opposing positive versus negative effects between and within individuals.

== Religion and economic growth ==
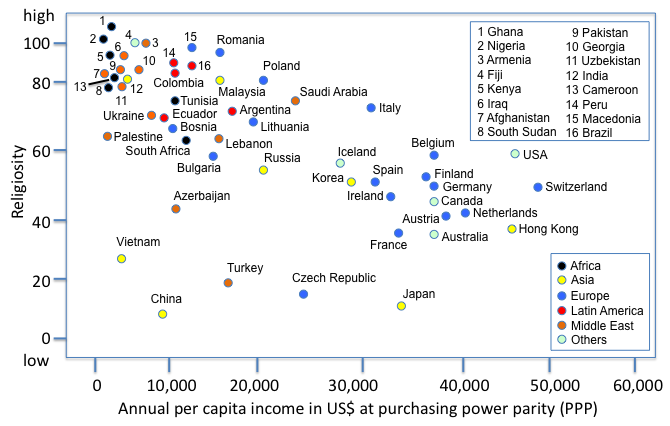
The average annual income of countries correlates negatively with national levels of religiosity.

Effects of religion on economic outcomes

Studies suggest there is a channel from religious behaviours to macroeconomic outcomes of economic growth, crime rates and institutional development. Scholars hypothesise religion impacts economic outcomes through religious doctrines promoting thrift, work ethic, honesty and trust. These channels were described by Max Weber in his work The Protestant Ethic and the Spirit of Capitalism. Weber indicates that Protestant teachings were an important force behind the transition to modern day capitalism in Europe. Other studies highlight the effects of religion on human capital formation as the main mechanism behind the dependency. Human capital formation is driven by higher religious importance of literacy

Effects of economic outcomes on religion

Studies indicate a two-way interaction between economic growth and religion. Secularization theory predicts that economic development reduces religious participation. The empirical evidence in favour of this relationship is mixed.

=== Historical aspects ===
Religion can have long-lasting effects on a society and its economy. For instance, municipalities of Spain with a history of a stronger inquisitorial presence show lower economic performance and educational attainment today. Similarly, Protestantism in Germany has long affected education and thus economic performance. In 1816, school attendance was about 50% in catholic regions while it was about 66% in Protestant regions. Higher literacy rates of Protestants can be observed in the 1870s/1880s in Prussia. It can be caused by the fact, that Martin Luther favoured Christians reading the Bible by themselves Elements of Protestant ethic described by Weber and economic prosperity may have emerged before the Reformation. In case of England, regions that were exposed to Cistercian monasteries experienced a faster productivity growth from the 13th century onwards. The cultural influence was persistent even after the monasteries were dissolved. Modern attitudes towards hard work are positively related with influence of the Cistercians in the region.

Economists view a person's participation in religious activities, such as attending worship services or venerating a deity, as a form of consumption within a market. For example, Mongol rulers granted tax exemptions to clergy, churches, and religious institutions in exchange for their blessings and prayers for the rulers' longevity and well-being. In this case, the foregone tax revenue can be seen as the price the Mongols paid for the religious services provided by the clergy and monks.

=== Criticisms ===
The correlation between religion and economic outcomes can be interpreted in two ways: (1) a feature intrinsic to religion which affects growth or (2) a feature correlated to religion but not religion itself which affects growth. Existing cross-country literature is criticised for inability to distinguish between the two explanations, a problem termed endogeneity bias. Controlling for country fixed effects mitigates bias but more recent studies utilise field and natural experiments to identify the causal effect of religion. Robustness of cross-country results to changes in specification of the statistical models is criticised in the literature.

== See also ==
- Christian views on poverty and wealth
- Buddhist economics
- Islamic economics
- Religion and business
- Sociology of religion
- Religious economy
- Religiosity and intelligence
- Wealth and religion
