= Religion and business =

Religion and business have throughout history interacted in ways that relate to and affected one another, as well as influenced sociocultural evolution, political geographies, and labour laws. As businesses expand globally they seek new markets which leads to expanding their corporation's norms and rules to encompass the new locations norms which most often involve religious rules and terms.

== Religious tourism ==
Some areas, countries or cities have an economy based on religious tourism. Examples include Islamic Hajj tourism and Vatican tourism. The hotels and markets of important religious places are a source of income to the locals.

=== Pilgrimage sites ===
The boards or shines sometimes receive so much in donations that governments to take it under control for proper utilization of resources and management. The annual revenues of most of the religious places are not regulated.

==== Religious tourism locations ====
===== Buddhism =====
- Lumbini – Lumbini is believed to be the birthplace of Siddhartha Gautama (the Buddha). Lumbini is home to the World Peace Pagoda, and the Lumbini Sacred Garden which is a symbol of world peace.
- Bodh Gaya – Bodh Gaya is believed to be the most important Buddhist pilgrimage site, as it is the place Buddha attained enlightenment. The Buddha achieved enlightenment meditating under the Bodhi Tree for 49 days. Bodh Gaya also has the Mahabodhi Temple, and the Vajrasana which is the seat underneath the Bodhi tree.
- Sarnath – Sarnath is the location where Buddha delivered his first discourse, Dhammacakka Pavattana Sutta. This speech explained the four noble truths and the noble eightfold path. Sarnath is also the place where Buddha appointed his first disciples. The location is known for the temple Mulaghandhakuti Vihara, where followers visit every night to chant the Dhannacakka Pavattana Sutta.

===== Christianity =====
- Church of the Nativity - This is one of the oldest churches located in Bethlehem and is believed to be the birthplace of Christ.
- The Church of the Holy Sepulcher - This church is believed to have been where Jesus was buried and resurrected.
- Vatican City – Located in Europe, Vatican City is one of the most visited pilgrimage sites in the world. Vatican City is home to the Pope, who is the leader of the worldwide Catholic Church. It is home to such works of art as Pieta, and the ceiling frescoes of the Sistine Chapel.

===== Hindu =====
- Varanasi – Varanasi is situated on the banks of the Ganges; the ancient city is known for its Golden Temple dedicated to Hindu god Shiva. Varanasi is known for its retirees seeking liberation. Ashes are often spread in and around the city to benefit the departed soul.
- Marthura – Marthura is a famous city known for being the location of Krishna's birth. It is also known for its temple Keshava Deo Mandir where Radha and Krishna are worshiped.
- Vrindavan – Vrindavan is a village where Krishna lived. The village has now grown and is home to 5,000 temples dedicated mostly to Krishna. Vrindavan is also known for housing many retired Vaishnavas hoping to return to the spiritual Vrindavan.

===== Islam =====
- Al-Masjid Alharam – Mecca, Saudi Arabia: Also known as The Grand Mosque, Al-Masjid Alharam is the largest Mosque in the world, measuring 356,800 square meters. During the Hajj period up to 2 million can be found in worship at the Mosque.
- Al-Masjid Al Nabawe – Medina, Saudi Arabia: Also known as The Prophet's Mosque.
- Dome of the Rock – The Dome of the Rock is in the Old City of Jerusalem on Temple Mount. It is the controversial a holy site for Christians, Jews, and Muslims.

===== Judaism =====
- Jerusalem – The capital of Israel and known for being a sacred place for people of the Jewish faith. Jerusalem is home to the Western Wall which is one of the most sacred places in the world. All the synagogues around the world have the holy arch facing Jerusalem.
- Hebron – The raised city, Hebron is located within the West Bank. Hebron is considered by many Jewish people the birthplace of Jewish civilization. Hebron also is the burial site of Jewish figures, Abraham, Sarah, Isaac, Rebecca, Jacob, Leah.
- Tiberias – Tiberias is on the shores of the Sea of Galilee and is known for its historical importance in Judaism. The Jerusalem Talmud a collection of oral Jewish Law, which is used for Jewish study was created in Tiberias.

== Business ethics ==
=== Judaism ===
Judaism outlines requirements of accurate weights and measurements in commerce, as well as prohibitions on monetary deception, verbal deception and misrepresentation. Jewish business ethics believe that god is the best source of value, believes in centrality of the community, and promise that men and women can transform themselves. The concept of business is perceived as legitimate by Judaism. There is a huge push for social responsibility in any business venture as well as a charity obligation of both public and private business organizations.

== Food processing ==
=== Halal ===
Globally, halal products comprise a US$2 trillion industry.

=== Kashrut ===
As of 2023, the kosher industry had certified more than 1.8 million products, which accounts for 70% of all US manufactured Food products, which total approximately US$1.1 trillion in sales annually. Kashrut foods are consumed by Jews, Muslims, Seven-Day Adventists, Vegetarians, persons with specific food allergies as well as general consumers.[20] In recent years many non-Jewish consumers are buying kosher meat due to the high quality and strict slaughter process which does not stress the animal during slaughter, which releases unhealthy hormones and chemicals in the animal in the process and feel kosher food in general is of higher quality than non-kosher foods.

== Religious and business laws ==
=== United Kingdom ===
United Kingdom labour law prohibits employer discrimination based on religion, belief, or any lack thereof.

=== United States ===
In the United States, labor laws including Title VII of the Civil Rights Act of 1964 prohibit businesses from discriminating against employees based on the basis of religion. Business law is also at times applied to religious organizations, due to their status as incorporated entities.

Religious Freedoms Act of 1993:

Stops any agency, department, or official of the United States or any state from substantially burdening a person's exercise of religion even if the burden results from a rule of general applicability, except that the government may burden a person's exercise of religion only if it demonstrates that application of the burden to the person.

Free Exercise Clause:

Congress shall make no law respecting an establishment of religion, or prohibiting the free exercise.

Equal Protection Clause:

Governmental body may not deny people equal protection of its governing clause.

== Religion in business ==
India
Government and private businesses in north and south India often do a Hindu ritual in which a priest comes to the premises, typically every week, and performs a ritual called Puja. The ritual is performed by doing an Aarti which is done by lighting a piece of camphor on a small metal holder or a lighting a thick thread soaked in small metal container which contains sesame or coconut oil for a few minutes and swinging it around pictures or idols of Hindu gods or goddesses present in the premises. Many small to medium public and private companies in India also have pictures, icons or small statues of Hindu gods and goddesses at their premises which are often worshiped by lighting incense sticks and putting them before those pictures or idols. Visiting priests also may perform a puja ritual by doing an Aarti before those pictures or idols or they may light incense sticks and swing these and put them before those pictures or idols. Individual flowers or a garland of flowers are also used for decoration of idols or pictures. The puja ritual is also done for items such as business purchases in government and private industries. These religious rituals take place regularly at government and private offices in north and south India. People in north and south India also exhibit religious symbols in businesses such as putting a Tilaka on their forehead which implies that they are involved with Hindu religion and believe that it brings them success in their day-to-day activities. Hindu Women in workplaces typically wear bindi on their forehead and if they are married, they would wear a necklace called Mangala sutra around their neck. They may sometimes wear kumkum on their hair and turmeric on their feet. Some Indian men and women wear rings or necklaces with talismans containing pictures or idols of Hindu gods and goddesses. The rings worn above may contain symbols of Hindu religion or precious stones as talismans. Men wear tight black or red or orange threads on the wrist of their right hand as they believe that such threads have some divine influence which works in their favour. Men who are Sikhs wear a turban on their head. Men in Sikh religion also wear a thick metal bangle called Kara on their right hand between their wrist and elbow.

It is not uncommon for people in India to bring up topics in religions at workplaces. Since there are no national or state laws in India to forbid religions in workplaces, people are generally comfortable in adapting their workplaces to religious themes or topics.

== Groups ==
Equal Employment Opportunity Commission (EEOC):

A Federal Agency that pushes equal opportunity in employment through administrative and judicial enforcement of the federal civil rights laws.

== Landmark United States Supreme Court cases ==
=== 1961 Braunfeld v. Brown (6–3/5–4) ===
Abraham Braunfeld owned a retail and clothing furnishing store in Philadelphia. As an Orthodox Jew he observes Sabbath and is not allowed to work. The Pennsylvania Blue Law only allowed certain businesses to remain open for business on Sunday. Because Braunfeld needs to be open six days a week for economic reasons but he couldn't be open on Saturday due to his observation of the Sabbath. The U.S. Supreme court found that the Pennsylvania Blue Law wasn't unconstitutional and didn't violate the free exercise clause. The law didn't make any religious practices unlawful. It was just a way find a statewide day of rest and it was unfortunate that it fell on Sunday.

The Court also based its opinion in part on two earlier rulings: In Two Guys from Harrison-Allentown, Inc. v. McGinley, 366 U.S. 582 (1961), and McGowan v. Maryland, 366 U.S. 420 (1961).

=== 1963 Sherbert v. Verner (7–2) ===
Adeil Sherbert was fired because she refused to work on Saturday, which was the day of her worship as she is a member of the Seventh-day Adventist Church. The Employment Security Commission ruled that people Sherbert was ineligible for unemployment benefits because not working on Saturday was not a good enough reason. The U.S. Supreme Court sided with Sherbert, citing the free exercise clause.

=== 1972 Wisconsin v. Yoder (9–0) ===
Jonas Yoder and Warren Miller members of the old order Amish religion, and Adin Yutzy a member of conservative Amish Mennonite Church. These three parents were prosecuted under Wisconsin law, which states that all children must attend public school till 16. The parents refused to send their children after 8th grade citing religious concerns. The U.S. Supreme Court sided with Yoder, Miller, and Yutzy under the free exercise clause.

=== 1977 Trans World Airlines, Inc. v. Hardison (7–2) ===
Larry Hardison was an employee at Trans World Airline. Hardison was a member of the Worldwide Church of God and refused to work on Saturdays which was his sabbath. TWA transferred his shift from night to during the day on Saturday. But he didn't keep the same seniority once he switched shifts and therefore didn't have Saturdays off. The Supreme court sided with the Trans World Airlines because the Equal Employment Opportunity Commission states there needs to be “reasonable” accommodations for religious exercise.

=== 1990 Employment Division Department of Human Resources of Oregon v. Smith (6–3) ===
Two employees of a private drug rehabilitation organization ingested peyote as part of their religious ceremony at a Native American Church. The employees were fired and applied for unemployment benefit but had not granted them because they were fired from workplace misconduct. The U.S. Supreme Court sided with the Employment Division of Oregon stating that even though the employees took peyote for religious reasons. Peyote is illegal in the United States.

=== 2014 Burwell v. Hobby Lobby Stores (5–4) ===
Hobby Lobby owners have organized their stores around Christian faith. The Affordable Care Act (ACA) requires for-profit businesses to provide preventative care, which includes contraceptives, to all employees. The owners of Hobby Lobby objected to this on the basis that it would force them to pay for some abortifacients, which violates their stated religious principles. They sued the Secretary of the Department of Health and Human Services, Burrell, based on violation of the free exercise clause. The U.S. Supreme Court sided with Hobby Lobby in a 5–4 decision. Since Hobby Lobby was a for-profit business owned by religious individuals to do their will, and similar exemptions existed for religious non-profits, the RFRA should be interpreted to provide exemptions for Hobby Lobby as well.

=== 2018 Masterpiece Cakeshop Ltd. v. Colorado Civil Rights Commission (7–2) ===
Masterpiece Cakeshop refused to make a cake for a wedding between two gay men, due to the business's religious standing. The Colorado Civil Rights Commission sided with the customers on the basis of discrimination on sexual orientation. The U.S. Supreme Court reversed the Colorado Civil Rights Commission's decision stating that they violated the business owner of Masterpiece Cakeshop's right to his free exercise of religion.

=== 2023 Groff v. DeJoy (9–0) ===
Groff was a postman who worked in the United States Postal Services (USPS). Being an evangelical, Protestant Christian, he observed the Sabbath on Sunday, refusing to work on that day. After initially trying to accommodate him, the USPS later alleged that it was unable to accommodate his request to transfer him to a role that did not require him working on Sunday. Groff eventually resigned and sued the USPS. In a case considering whether to overrule the Trans World Airlines case aforementioned, the Supreme Court chose not to overrule the case but sided with Groff in clarifying that the "undue hardship" standard imposed in Title VII does not equate to "de minimis" and instead stated that a business must show "a more than de minimis cost".

=== 2023 303 Creative LLC v. Elenis (6–3) ===
Similar to the Masterpiece Cakeshop case, this case concerned whether discrimination laws can compel people to provide work that violates their religious beliefs and values. 303 Creative LLC filed a pre-enforcement challenge against the same Colorado anti-discrimination laws that were challenged in the Masterpiece Cakeshop case. After much litigation, the case eventually reached the U.S. Supreme Court. The Supreme Court ruled that the public-accommodation law is unconstitutional under the Free Speech Clause of the First Amendment to the United States Constitution, stating that the law violated the petitioner's right to free speech.

== See also ==
- Economics of religion
- The Protestant Ethic and the Spirit of Capitalism
- Wealth and religion
