= Wealth and religion =

Research into wealth and religious belief

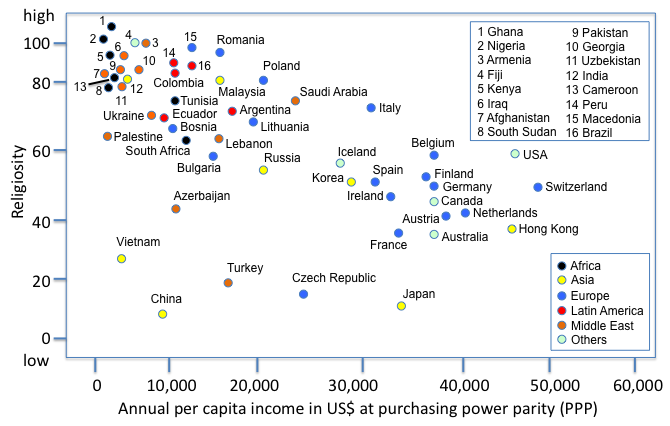
The average annual income of countries correlates negatively with national levels of religiosity.

The correlation between wealth and religion has been subject to academic research. Wealth is the status of being the beneficiary or proprietor of a large accumulation of capital and economic power. Religion is a socio-cultural system that often involves belief in supernatural forces and may intend to provide a moral system or a meaning to life.

== Statistics ==
=== Global ===
Global wealth based on religion is difficult to quantify due to inconsistent and opaque reporting requirements across countries.

Theocratic countries are a large source of wealth concentration for religions. As of 2026, there are 7 theocratic countries: Afghanistan, Iran, Mauritania, Saudi Arabia, Vatican City, and Yemen. All are muslim except for Vatican City, which is catholic.

=== United States ===
How income varies among U.S. religious groups (2014)
- https://www.pewresearch.org/short-reads/2016/10/11/how-income-varies-among-u-s-religious-groups/

A study in the United States (based on data from 1985 to 1998), conducted by the sociologist Lisa A. Keister and published in the Social Forces journal, found that adherents of Judaism and Episcopalianism accumulated the most wealth, believers in Catholicism and mainline Protestants were in the middle, while conservative Protestants accumulated the least; in general, people who attend religious services accumulated more wealth than those who do not (taking into account variations of education and other factors). Keister suggested that family processes shape wealth accumulation. According to the study, the median net worth of people believing in Judaism is calculated at US$150,890, while the median net worth of conservative Protestants (including Baptists, Seventh-day Adventists, Christian Scientists) was US$26,200. The overall median in the dataset was US$48,200.

Some of the wealthiest and most affluent American families such as the Vanderbilts, Astors, Rockefellers, Du Ponts, Roosevelts, Forbes, Fords, Mellons, Whitneys, Morgans, and Harrimans are white primarily mainline Protestant families.

Another study in the United States, from 2012, stated that 48% of Hindus had a household income of $100,000 or more, and 70% make at least $75,000, which is the highest among all religions in United States.

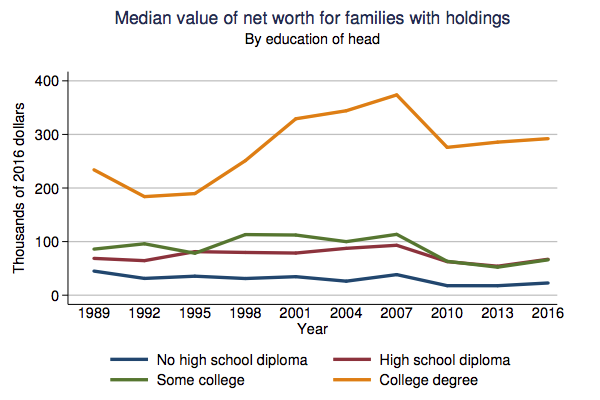
Pew Research states that wealth differences between religions "largely mirror the differences in educational attainment."

Pew Research Center reported in 2015 that Hindus, Jews, atheists, and agnostics were relatively wealthy compared to other religious demographics. The report stated that these differences "across religious traditions largely mirror the differences in educational attainment."

According to a 2014 study by the Pew Research Center, Jewish again ranked as the most financially successful religious group in the United States, with 44% of Jews living in households with incomes of at least $100,000, followed by Hindu (36%), Episcopalians (35%), and Presbyterians (32%). In a 2016 report about their study, Pew Research stated "members of some religious groups – not to mention atheists and agnostics – on average have a higher household income than others and those in the richest religious groups also tend, on average, to be better educated than most Americans." Amongst Jews, in 2016, Modern Orthodox Jews had a median household income of $158,000, while Open Orthodoxy Jews had a median household income of $185,000 (compared to the American median household income of $59,000 in 2016). According to the same study, there is a correlation between education and income; about 77% of American Hindus have an undergraduate degree, followed by Jews (59%), Episcopalians (56%), and Presbyterians (47%).

== Explanations ==
A study published in the American Journal of Sociology by Lisa Keister found that "wealth affects religion indirectly through educational attainment, fertility, and female labor force participation", but also found some evidence of direct effects of religion on wealth attainment. Keister notes that certain religious beliefs ("one should have many children", "women should not work") lower wealth accumulation, both on the micro- and macro-scales.

== See also ==
- Christian views on poverty and wealth
- Economics of religion
- Female labor force in the Muslim world
- Happiness and religion
- Jewish views of poverty, wealth and charity
- List of fortune deities
- Prosperity theology
- Protestant work ethic
- Religion and business
- Religion and peacebuilding
- Religiosity and intelligence
