= Trans World Airlines, Inc. v. Hardison =

US Supreme Court case on religious liberty and equality in employment

- Supreme Court of the United States

Argued March 30, 1977 Decided June 16, 1977
- Full case name: Trans World Airlines, Inc. v. Hardison
- Docket no.: 75-1126
- Citations: 432 U.S. 63 (more)

Questions presented
- Whether Hardison's discharge from employment on account of observance of a seventh-day sabbath constituted religious discrimination in violation of § 703(a)(1) of Title VII of the Civil Rights Act of 1964, which makes it an unlawful employment practice for an employer to discriminate against an employee on the basis of his religion

Holding
- TWA, which made reasonable efforts to accommodate respondent's religious needs, did not violate Title VII, and each of the Court of Appeals' suggested alternatives would have been an undue hardship within the meaning of the statute as construed by the EEOC guidelines.

Court membership
- Chief Justice Warren E. Burger Associate Justices William J. Brennan Jr. · Potter Stewart; Byron White · Thurgood Marshall; Harry Blackmun · Lewis F. Powell Jr. William Rehnquist · John P. Stevens

Case opinions
- Majority: White, joined by Burger, Stewart, Blackmun, Powell, Rehnquist, Stevens
- Dissent: Marshall, joined by Brennan

Trans World Airlines, Inc. v. Hardison, 432 U.S. 63 (1977), is a landmark decision on religious liberty and employment law. In 1977, the US Supreme Court held that an employer may discharge an employee who observes a seventh-day sabbath, and that such employee is not entitled to equal employment opportunity protection under Title VII of the Civil Rights Act of 1964, which makes it an unlawful employment practice for an employer to discriminate against an employee on the basis of his religion.

This ruling has been significantly tailored by Groff v. DeJoy which held that increased costs that are more than 'de minimis' are not sufficient to demonstrate 'undue hardship', and that the onus is on the employer to demonstrate that granting the exemption would incur "substantial increased costs" compared to the normal costs of business.

== Case History ==
Larry Hardison was an employee at Trans World Airlines. Hardison was a member of the Worldwide Church of God and refused to work on Saturdays which was his sabbath. TWA transferred him from the night shift to the daytime on Saturdays. However, his seniority was affected by the shift change, and the union did not allow him to take Saturdays off. TWA declined a proposal for him to work a four-day week and ultimately discharged him for refusing to work on Saturdays.

== Supreme Court Decision ==
The Supreme Court sided with Trans World Airlines, stating that the Equal Employment Opportunity Commission requires "reasonable" accommodations for religious exercise. Justice Thurgood Marshall, in a widely-cited dissent, wrote, "[O]ne of this Nation's pillars of strength, our hospitality to religious diversity, has been seriously eroded."

== Challenges to the legal precedent ==
Various challenges to the TWA v. Hardison precedent have emerged over time. In 2020, the Supreme Court declined to review Patterson v. Walgreen, a case which might have led to a reconsideration of the TWA v. Hardison precedent. Justice Alito, joined by Justices Thomas and Gorsuch, wrote a statement calling for the Hardison precedent to be reconsidered in a future appropriate case:

I agree with the most important point made in that brief, namely, that we should reconsider the proposition, endorsed by the opinion in Trans World Airlines, Inc. v. Hardison, 432 U. S. 63, 84 (1977), that Title VII does not require an employer to make any accommodation for an employee's practice of religion if doing so would impose more than a de minimis burden. . . . As the Solicitor General observes, Hardison's reading does not represent the most likely interpretation of the statutory term "undue hardship"; the parties' briefs in Hardison did not focus on the meaning of that term; no party in that case advanced the de minimis position; and the Court did not explain the basis for this interpretation. See Brief for United States as Amicus Curiae 19–21. I thus agree with the Solicitor General that we should grant review in an appropriate case to consider whether Hardison's interpretation should be overruled.

Similarly, in 2021, the Supreme Court denied certiorari in Dalberiste v. GLE Associates and Small v. Memphis Light, Gas & Water, cases that potentially challenged the established precedent. Justices Gorsuch and Alito wrote a dissent to the denial of certiorari.

On September 26, 2022, 15 members of the US Congress filed an amicus brief arguing that the standard in Hardison for "undue hardship" conflicted with the text and legislative purpose of Title VII. They urged the court to grant certiorari in Groff v. DeJoy and overturn the standing precedent.

=== Groff v. DeJoy ===
The Supreme Court discussed the Groff v. DeJoy case in their conference on January 13, 2023, and granted certiorari. This case challenges the legal precedent from TWA. The precedential value of Hardison is now lessened by the court's opinion in Groff:

Today, the Solicitor General disavows its prior position that Hardison should be overruled--but only on the understanding that Hardison does not compel courts to read the "more than de minimis" standard "literally" or in a manner that undermines Hardison's references to "substantial" cost. With the benefit of comprehensive briefing and oral argument, we agree.

— Groff v. DeJoy, No. 22-174, 600 U.S. ___, slip op. at 14-15 (June 29, 2023)

== See also ==
- Estate of Thornton v. Caldor, Inc., 1985
- Sunday closing law
