= Importance of religion by country =

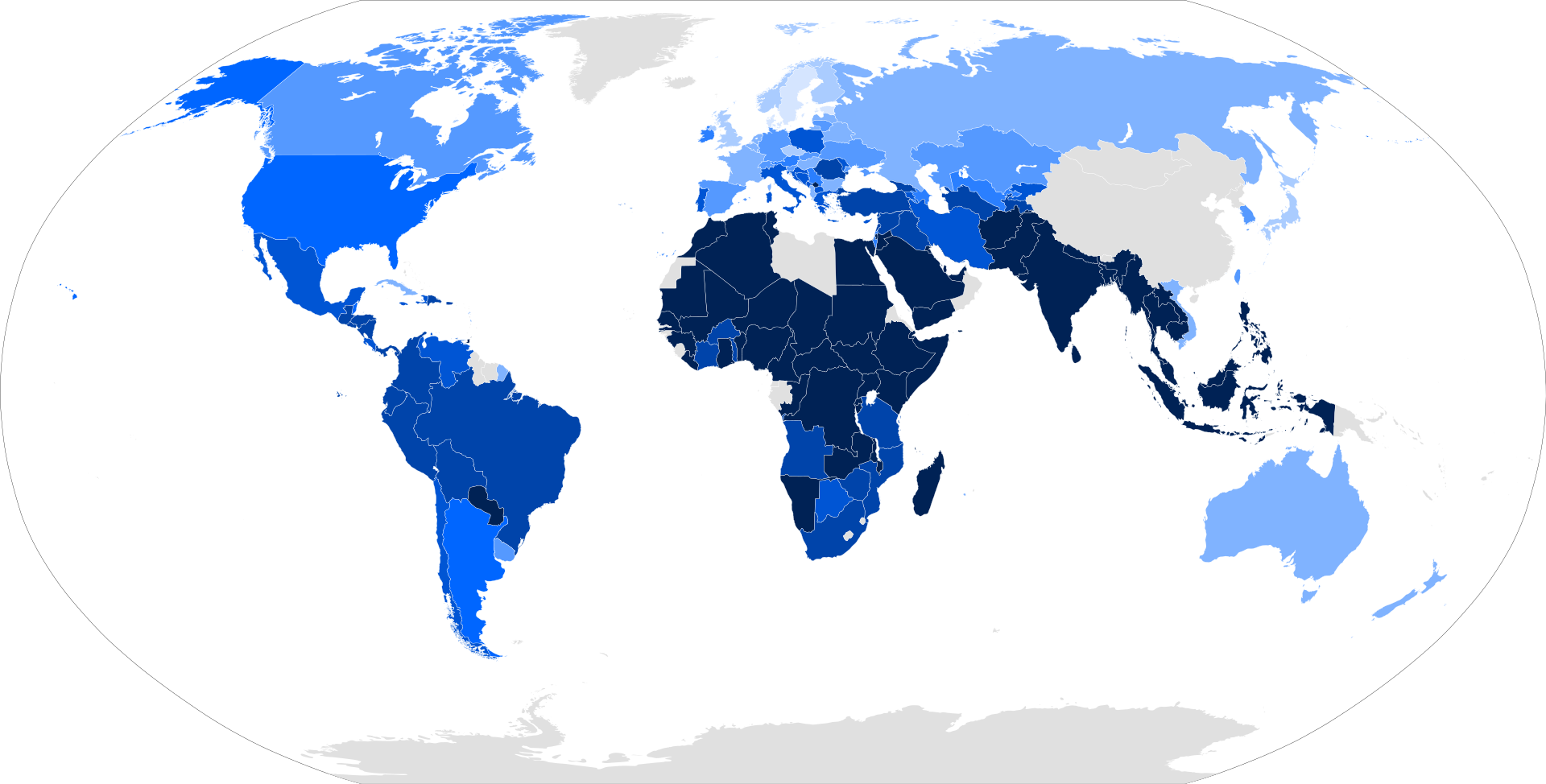
Results of a 2008/2009 Gallup poll on whether respondents said that religion was "important in [their] daily life.": 90%-100% 80%-89% 70%-79% 60%-69% / 50%-59% 40%-49% 30%-39% 20%-29% / 10%-19% 0%-9% No data

This article charts a list of countries by importance of religion.

== Methodology ==
The table below is based on the global Gallup Poll in 2009 research which asked "Is religion important in your daily life?". Percentages for "yes" and "no" answers are listed below; they often do not add up to 100% because some answered "don't know" or did not answer.

== Countries/districts ==
Country/district	Yes, important	No, unimportant
Afghanistan	97%	3%
Albania	39%	53%
Algeria	95%	4%
Argentina	66%	33%
Armenia	73%	25%
Azerbaijan	50%	49%
Bahrain	94%	4%
Bangladesh	99%	1%
Belarus	34%	56%
Bolivia	89%	10%
Bosnia and Herzegovina	77%	21%
Brazil	87%	13%
Burundi	98%	2%
Cambodia	96%	3%
Cameroon	96%	4%
Canada	42%	57%
Chad	95%	5%
Chile	70%	29%
Colombia	83%	16%
Comoros	97%	2%
Costa Rica	79%	19%
Cote d'Ivoire	88%	12%
Croatia	70%	28%
Cyprus	75%	24%
Democratic Republic of the Congo	94%	5%
Denmark	19%	80%
Dominican Republic	87%	13%
Djibouti	96%	2%
Ecuador	82%	17%
Egypt	97%	2%
El Salvador	83%	16%
Estonia	16%	78%
France	30%	69%
Georgia	81%	16%
Germany	40%	59%
Ghana	95%	5%
Greece	71%	28%
Guatemala	88%	9%
Honduras	84%	15%
Hong Kong	24%	74%
Hungary	39%	58%
India	90%	9%
Indonesia	100%	0%
Iraq	84%	11%
Ireland	54%	46%
Israel	51%	48%
Italy	72%	25%
Japan	24%	75%
Kazakhstan	43%	58%
Kenya	94%	6%
Kosovo	90%	8%
Kuwait	91%	6%
Kyrgyzstan	72%	25%
Latvia	39%	58%
Lebanon	87%	12%
Lithuania	42%	49%
Luxembourg	39%	59%
Malawi	99%	1%
Malaysia	96%	3%
Mali	95%	4%
Malta	86%	10%
Mauritania	98%	2%
Mexico	73%	25%
Moldova	72%	19%
Montenegro	71%	28%
Morocco	97%	1%
Nepal	93%	6%
Nicaragua	84%	15%
Niger	100%	0%
Nigeria	96%	3%
North Macedonia	76%	22%
Pakistan	92%	6%
Palestine	93%	7%
Panama	88%	11%
Paraguay	92%	8%
Peru	84%	14%
Philippines	96%	4%
Poland	75%	19%
Qatar	95%	4%
Romania	84%	12%
Russia	34%	56%
Rwanda	95%	5%
Saudi Arabia	93%	4%
Senegal	96%	4%
Serbia	54%	44%
Singapore	70%	29%
Slovenia	47%	52%
South Africa	85%	15%
South Korea	43%	56%
Spain	49%	50%
Sri Lanka	99%	1%
Sudan	93%	7%
Sweden	17%	82%
Switzerland	41%	57%
Syria	89%	9%
Tajikistan	85%	12%
Tanzania	89%	11%
Thailand	97%	2%
Tunisia	93%	5%
Turkey	82%	15%
Turkmenistan	80%	18%
Uganda	93%	7%
Ukraine	46%	48%
United Arab Emirates	91%	8%
United Kingdom	27%	73%
United States	65%	34%
Uruguay	41%	59%
Uzbekistan	51%	46%
Venezuela	79%	21%
Vietnam	30%	69%
Yemen	99%	1%
Zambia	95%	5%
Zimbabwe	88%	12%

== See also ==
- Demographics of atheism
- Demographics of religion
- List of countries by irreligion
- List of religious populations
- Religions by country
- Religiosity and intelligence
- Wealth and religion
