= Groff v. DeJoy =

- Supreme Court of the United States

Argued April 18, 2023 Decided June 29, 2023
- Full case name: Gerald E. Groff v. Louis DeJoy, Postmaster General
- Docket no.: 22-174
- Citations: 600 U.S. 447 (more)
- Argument: Oral argument
- Opinion announcement: Opinion announcement

Case history
- Prior: Groff v. DeJoy, No. 5:19-cv-1879 (E.D. Pa., Apr. 6, 2021), aff'd, Groff v. Dejoy, 35 F.4th 162 (3d Cir., May 25 2022); cert. granted (Jan. 13, 2023)

Questions presented
- (1) Whether this Court should disapprove its more-than-de-minimis-cost test for Title VII religious accommodations stated in Trans World Airlines, Inc. v. Hardison, 432 U.S. 63 (1977); and (2) Whether an employer may demonstrate "undue hardship on the conduct of the employer's business" under Title VII by showing that the requested accommodation burdens the employee's co-workers as opposed to the business entity.

Holding
- Title VII requires an employer that denies a religious accommodation to show that the burden of granting an accommodation would result in substantial increased costs in relation to the conduct of its particular business.

Court membership
- Chief Justice John Roberts Associate Justices Clarence Thomas · Samuel Alito; Sonia Sotomayor · Elena Kagan; Neil Gorsuch · Brett Kavanaugh; Amy Coney Barrett · Ketanji Brown Jackson

Case opinions
- Majority: Alito, joined by unanimous
- Concurrence: Sotomayor, joined by Jackson

Laws applied
- Title VII of the Civil Rights Act

Groff v. DeJoy, 600 U.S. 447 (2023), was a United States Supreme Court case regarding religious liberty and employment accommodations under Title VII of the Civil Rights Act of 1964. Prior, Trans World Airlines, Inc. v. Hardison (1977) had established that an employer could deny an employee religious exemptions from work if they could show "undue hardship" in making the accommodation, a vague phrase at the center of Groff. The case was decided unanimously for Groff by the Court. While generally upholding Trans World, the court clarified that increased costs that are more than "de minimis" are not sufficient to demonstrate "undue hardship", and that the onus is on the employer to demonstrate that granting the exemption would incur "substantial increased costs" compared to the normal costs of business. This decision has been widely praised by religious organizations.

== Background ==
Gerald E. Groff was a mail carrier, specifically a Rural Carrier Associate (RCA), working for the United States Postal Service (USPS) from 2012 until 2019. He is an evangelical, Protestant Christian and observes Sunday Sabbath. As such, he is required by his religion to rest and worship on a Sunday instead of working.

In 2013, Amazon contracted the USPS to deliver their packages. Quarryville, Pennsylvania soon became an important hub and started delivering Amazon packages from 2015 onwards. Groff was initially an RCA at the Quarryville post office and informed the USPS of his religious need and his inability to work on Sundays. Accordingly, the USPS moved to accommodate his religious requirements by allowing him not to work on Sunday insofar as he covered the other shifts throughout the week.

However, in May 2016, a memorandum of understanding (MOU) between the USPS and the National Rural Letter Carriers' Association only allowed the exemption of work on Sunday on two conditions: if the person had applied for leave on that day and if the person would have exceeded the limit of forty hours of work that week on Sunday.

The MOU did not provide Groff with a religious exemption to working on Sundays and as a result, the USPS again moved to accommodate him by transferring him to a smaller station that did not fulfill Amazon deliveries, the Holtwood post office.

Similarly to Quarryville, Holtwood also started Sunday Amazon deliveries in March 2017. The postmaster at Holtwood offered to allow Groff to pray on Sunday morning before returning to work later in the day, but he declined the offer. In the peak season of 2017, another RCA volunteered to take over his shifts on Sunday, but that worker fell ill, leaving the rest of the RCAs and the postmaster to be additionally burdened to take over delivery on Sundays.

Groff continued to be absent from his scheduled work on Sundays after the 2017 peak season and consequently was punished, so he filed a complaint asking USPS to transfer him to a job that did not require him to work on Sundays. This complaint was promptly denied as no position in the USPS had such an exemption.

Groff eventually resigned in 2019 and sued the USPS for disparate treatment due to his religion and for failure to accommodate his religion.

== Proceedings below ==
Groff filed suit in the United States District Court for the Eastern District of Pennsylvania, arguing that the USPS discriminated against him.

In his first argument, Groff argued that he had direct evidence that the USPS discriminated against him. Nevertheless, the court found the evidence provided by Groff against the USPS to be insufficient. Therefore, the McDonnell Douglass burden shifting test was used, which placed the burden on the plaintiff, Groff, to show that there was a prima facie case of religious discrimination, which he did. The burden then shifted to the USPS to reason if there was a non-discriminatory reason to do so; the USPS did so by proving the importance of Sunday Amazon delivery due to their poor financial situation. The burden shifted back to the plaintiff to prove a pretext, which he failed to do. Therefore, the court rejected his first argument.

In his second argument on failure to accommodate, the court rejected the argument, saying that the employer does not need to entirely rectify the conflict to accommodate and they do not need to accommodate the request due to Groff's request adding an undue hardship on the company. The court added that satisfying the demands by the petitioner is more than a de minimis burden, as set forth by Trans World Airlines, Inc. v. Hardison.

Groff appealed to the United States Court of Appeals for the Third Circuit, which affirmed the district court's decision by a 2–1 vote, with Judge Thomas Hardiman dissenting.

Groff then filed a petition for a writ of certiorari.

== Supreme Court ==
Fifteen Republican members of Congress filed an amicus brief in support of the plaintiff, on September 26, 2022, arguing that the standard set in Hardison for "undue hardship" was irreconcilable with the text and congressional purpose of Title VII, asking the court to grant certiorari and overturn its precedent.

The Supreme Court granted certiorari on January 13, 2023, and heard oral argument on April 18, 2023.

On June 29, 2023, the Supreme Court ruled 9–0 for Groff, remanding the case back to the Third Circuit. Justice Alito wrote the opinion, Justice Sotomayor filed a concurring opinion which Justice Jackson joined.

=== Opinion of the Court ===
The opinion clarified Title VII's standard of "undue hardship" does not mean de minimis. The ruling states that "undue hardship is very different from de minimis" and that an employer even "showing more than de minimis cost" in providing religious accommodation "does not suffice to establish undue hardship." This ruling places additional onus on the employer to prove that the burden placed on them to accommodate an employee's religious needs is "substantial in the overall context of an employer's business" to deny that employee's religious needs.

Both parties' elaborations of their test, where Groff argued that lower courts should follow the jurisprudence under the Americans with Disabilities Act (ADA) to compel companies to accommodate an employee's religious exemption from work, and conversely, the United States argued that Equal Employment Opportunity Commission's (EEOC) construction of Hardison was "basically correct", were found by the court to be "too far" and were squarely rejected.

=== Concurring opinion ===
In her 3-page concurring opinion, Justice Sotomayor wrote that for many years the EEOC had already been interpreting the "undue hardship" to be on the conduct of the company's business. She also added that the court's decision to not overrule the Hardison test for a "significant difficulty or expense standard" test, similar to the one in the ADA, to be the right decision and signalled to Congress to make that decision themselves. Lastly, she clarified that burdens on co-workers may be undue hardship. She explained that animus towards co-workers and things like coordinating voluntary shift swaps are not undue hardship, but clarified that effects on co-workers can still be "undue hardship" to the employer.

== See also ==
- Equal Employment Opportunity Commission v. Abercrombie & Fitch Stores
- Religion and business § Landmark United States Supreme Court cases
