= Amish Mennonite Church, O'Neill =

Church in Nebraska

Coordinates: 42.5963°N 98.717°W

The Amish Mennonite Church, O'Neill, sometimes called the Pleasant Hill Amish Mennonite Church, was built in 1888 in Holt County, Nebraska by a group of Anabaptist settlers. The deeply religious settlers from Germany fled military conscription and were attracted to the opportunity of the Nebraska plains. The 1883 edition of the Anabaptist paper The Herald of Truth included a notice encouraging settlers from the East to move to O'Neill, Nebraska. In it, P. P. Herschberger wrote "There are already several families here, and we hope to build up a church. We hope others from the East may be induced to settle here."

== History ==
The church building was built in 1888 by Christian Ernst and his son. The stone foundation of the 18' x 24' building remains visible over a century later. Early families in the congregation included the Hershbergers, the Ernsts and the Yantzis. The area the Mennonites settled in was Shields Township. Communities were named for the creek areas – Eagle creek, Blackbird creek, Honey creek Turkey creek and others. Families homesteaded along creeks because they needed water immediately upon arrival.

Reports from the Herald of Truth Mennonite periodical from the 1880s refer to the area as 'Slocum, Holt County, Nebraska'. Menno Erb alone wrote 5 letters over the years encouraging other Mennonite settlers to consider relocating to the Holt County area. Many families moved to Holt County during the first twenty years of the congregation. The name 'Pleasant Hill' does not appear in the records until much later. Paul P. Herschberger was the first minister and the first bishop was Joseph Schlegel of Milford, Nebraska.

In 1888, The Yantzi family deeded two acres of land for the establishment of a church and cemetery. The deed was recorded in the Holt County Book of Deeds, on May 9, 1888, on page 173. The legal description is – "Two acres of land, situated in the Southeast corner of the South-East 1/4, Section 4, Twp. 30, Range 12 West." According to the deed, "The above two acres running north and south, and to be used as a church site and burial grounds. To have and to hold in trust for the Amish Mennonnite Church, to have and to hold for church purposes...".

The men and boys sat on one side of the church, and the women, girls, and younger children on the other. The married men wore beards. The men and the boys wore broad-brimmed hats, the women wore prayer caps. Following the Amish ancient custom hooks and eyes were used rather than buttons on their clothes. Services and Sunday School classes were conducted in German until World War I, when Jacob W. Oswald was ordained as a minister so he could say service in English.

Many of the families left the area in the mid to late 1930s as the economic pressures of the depression, coupled with several years of drought and crop failure took their toll. The church ceased operation in 1938. In the fall of 1940, the church building and its contents including the pulpit and pews was sold for $28 to the Weselyean Methodist Church of Spencer, Nebraska.

== Cemetery ==
As of 2019, all that remains of the church building itself is the foundation. Visitors can locate the cemetery at the NW corner of the intersection of Road 881 and Avenue 489 by looking for the metal sign indicating the location of the small historic cemetery. The cemetery consists of a plot of approximately thirty graves, oriented in several rows. There are a number of interments from the Blizzard of 1888, also called the Schoolhouse Blizzard. The cemetery is situated in remote farmland. The cemetery is located approximately 9 miles north and three miles west of the town of O'Neill. Members of the Beemer Mennonite Church visit the cemetery at least twice a year to mow the grass and tend to the graves. Many of the members of the Beemer Mennonite Church bear the names of their ancestors buried in the Amish Mennonite Cemetery in Holt County.

The primary family names in the cemetery are Bellar (7), Erb (5), Ernst(7), Huebert(4), Kennel, Oswald, Riser, Schweitzer and Yantzie. The cemetery has several rows of marble headstones and a metal sign identifying it as the Amish Mennonite Cemetery.

=== Notable interments ===
Mary Axt (Ochs—German spelling) is the first burial recorded in the cemetery in December 1887. Records indicate she and her infant son died shortly after childbirth and were both buried in the same coffin. She was formerly Mary Schweitzer.

Katherine Oesch – Died in childbirth during the cold night before the worst of the snow during blizzard of 1888, January 11. According to her obituary 'Sister Catherine (Erb) fell asleep in Jesus about 4 hours after giving birth to a child and leaves her husband and 6 children.'

Joseph Beller – From his obituary, 'On January 12, 1888, in Holt Co., Nebraska Joseph Beller 44 years, 9 months and some days. He had been on a visit to a friend 2 1/2 miles from home and was returning home when he was overtaken by a blizzard which lasted nearly a day and a night. About 12'O'Clock on the 13th he was found about 80 rods from his house frozen stiff. He leaves his wife, Sona, and a child by a former marriage. He was formerly a member of the A.M. Church but was not one at the time of his death.' He had been on the road with a team and a sled. Caught by the blizzard, he had tried to overturn the sled and take shelter underneath it. Unable, for some reason, to get under it, he froze to death beside it.

== See also ==
- Anabaptist settlers
