= Female labor force in the Muslim world =

Involvement of Muslim women in labor

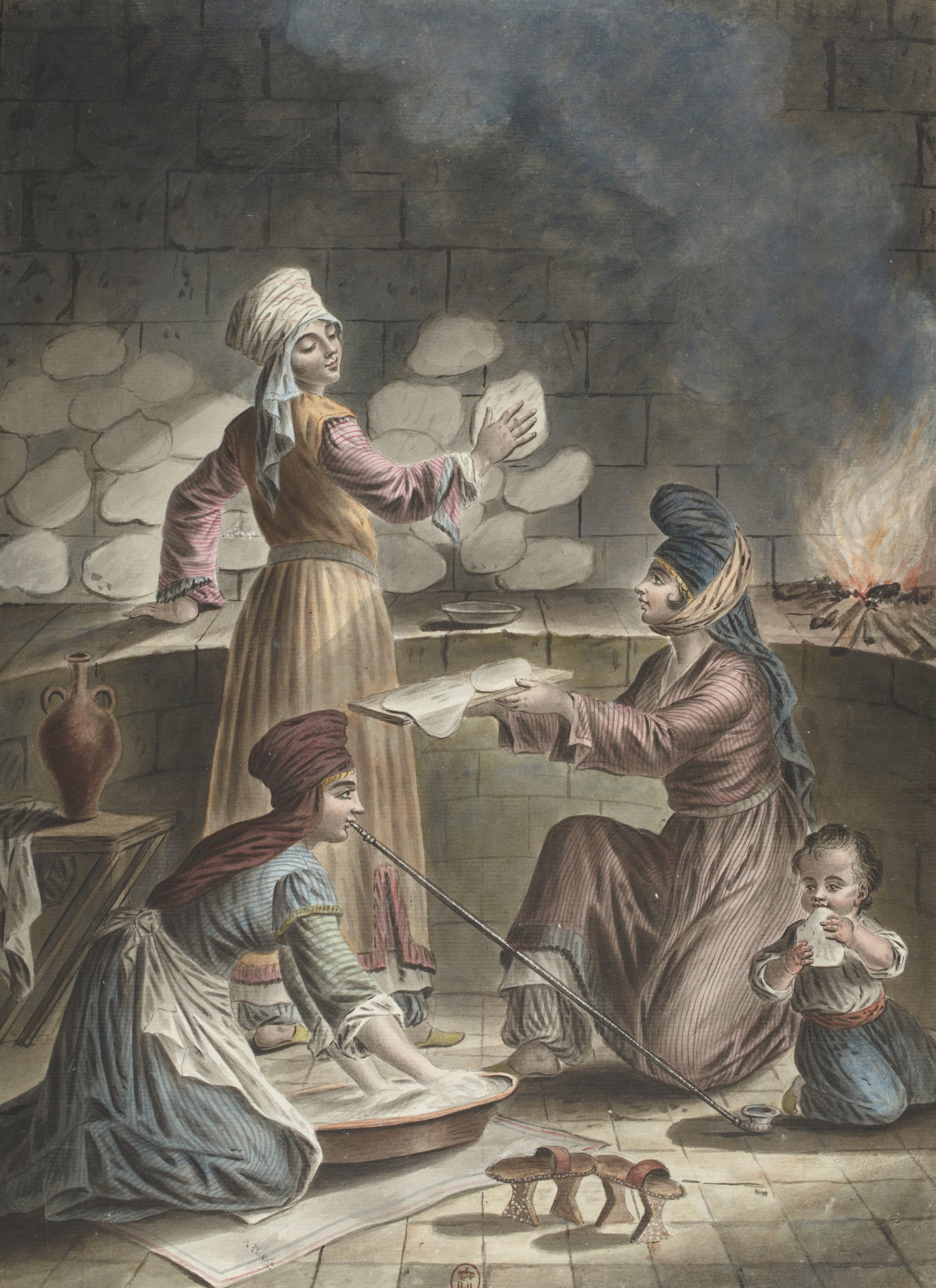
Turkish Muslim women baking bread in the year 1790

Female participation and advancement in majority Muslim countries, or nations in which more than 50% of the population identifies as an adherent of the Islamic faith, have traditionally been areas of controversy. Several Western nations, such as the United States and Western Europe, have criticised majority Muslim nations for the lack of involvement and opportunity for women in the private sector.

Low levels of female labor participation, large wage gaps by gender, and few female executives in large companies in majority Muslim nations are common criticisms of these nations. Accordingly, significant data has been gathered by global institutions about female workers in majority Muslim nations to test these cultural beliefs. Development economists and multinational organizations, such as the United Nations, World Bank, and the International Labour Organization, have gathered significant amounts of data to study the labor contributions of and commercial opportunities for women.

== Majority Muslim nations ==
A map of the Muslim population of the world, by percentage of each country, according to the Pew Forum 2009 report on world Muslim populations

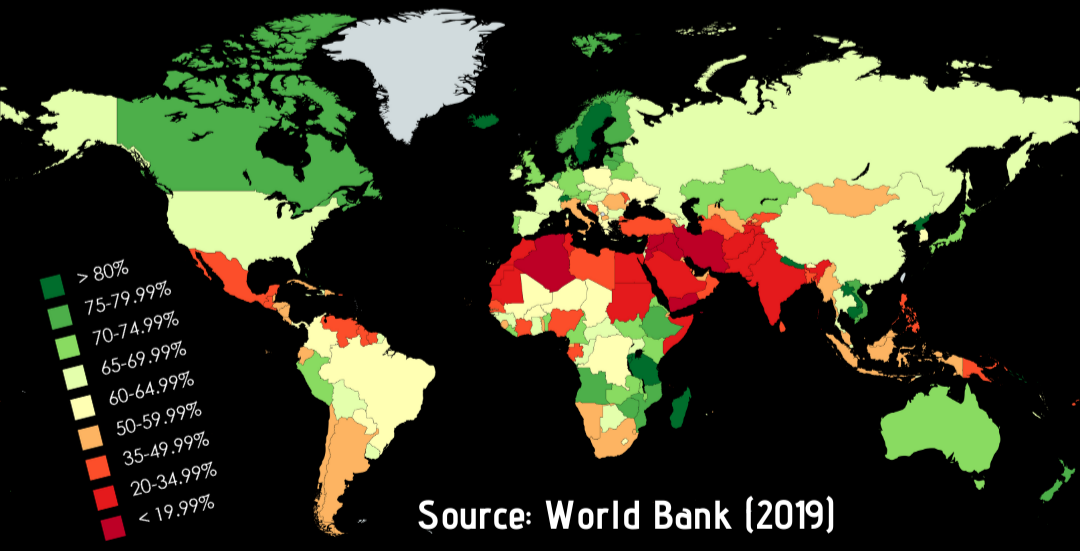
Female labor force participation rate, ages 15-64 (World Bank/ILO, 2019)

There are fifty-one countries in the world in which more than 50% of the population identify as Muslims. These countries spread from North Africa, to the Middle East, to the Balkans and Central Asia, to Southeast Asia. While many nations contain a strong Muslim presence, majority Muslim nations, by definition, have more Muslims as citizens than non-Muslims. Not all majority Muslim states, however, have Islam as their established religion. Turkey, for example, is a prominent Muslim country in which 99% of the population follows some form of Islam. However, there is no official religion. The state is secular. Nigeria is also a majority Muslim country which is officially secular.

Most majority Muslim nations, however, recognize Islam as the official state religion. Furthermore, many states identify a specific derivative of the Islamic faith as their official religion. For example, sunni Islam is the official state religion of: Afghanistan, Algeria, Bangladesh, Jordan, Libya, Saudi Arabia, Tunisia, Somalia, and the United Arab Emirates. Shia Islam is the official religion of Iran, which is a theocracy. Some minority Islamic sects are official state religions as well. Ibadi, a minority school within Islam, is the official religion of Oman.

Table 1: Selected Majority Muslim Countries

Country	Population	% Muslim	Dominant Sect
Afghanistan	28,395,716	99%	Sunni
Egypt	97,343,000	90%	Sunni
Syria	22,505,000	90%	Sunni
Iran	76,923,300	98%	Shia
Iraq	31,234,000	97%	Shia
Turkey	73,722,988	99%	Sunni
Indonesia	228,582,000	86.1%	Sunni
Tunisia	10,383,577	98%	Sunni
Pakistan	172,800,000	97%	Sunni
Bangladesh	142,319,000	89%	Sunni
Saudi Arabia	27,601,038	99%	Sunni
Nigeria	155,215,573	50.4%	Sunni

Not all states in the Muslim World institutionalize a distinction between the sects of Islam. In Pakistan and Iraq, Islam as a faith, is recognized as the official religion. All sects or schools are included. In Egypt, freedom of religion is extended to the Abrahamic religions even though Sunni Islam is the state-sponsored religion. Similarly, Indonesia, which is the world's largest Muslim country, guarantees freedom of religion but only recognizes six official religions. Islam is one of and the most prominent of the six. Despite a common religion, majority Muslim nations are quite disparate in terms of size, population, demographic composition, and the legal framework of religion.

== General female labor force participation ==
Table 2: Female Labor Force Participation Rate

Country/Year	Afghanistan	Egypt	Syria	Iran	Iraq	Turkey	Indonesia	Tunisia	Pakistan	Bangladesh	Saudi Arabia	Nigeria
2008	15%	23%	14%	15%	14%	25%	51%	25%	22%	56%	17%	48%
2009	15%	24%	13%	15%	14%	27%	51%	25%	22%	57%	17%	48%
2010	16%	24%	13%	16%	14%	28%	51%	25%	22%	57%	17%	48%

Source: Global Gender Gap Report 2012, World Economic Forum

A basic indicator of women's involvement in the formal economy is a statistic known as the labor force participation rate. This data point shows the percentage of women in a country who are either employed in full or part-time labor. According to the International Labour Organization, the labor force participation rate is defined as "the proportion of the population ages 15 and older that is economically active: all people who supply labor for the production of goods and services during a specified period." Table 2 lists the labor force participation rates of women in eleven majority Muslim countries. Majority Muslim countries are defined as states in which more than 50% of the population identifies with the Islamic faith.

Of these eleven countries, Bangladesh and Indonesia had the highest rates of female participation in the labor force in 2010 with 57% and 51%, respectively. Syria, Iraq, and Afghanistan have the lowest rates of female labor force participation among these eleven nations with 13%, 14%, and 15%, respectively. However, numerically large discrepancies exist in the data for a couple of nations when drawn from different sources. Afghanistan's female labor force participation rate, for example, was 15% in 2010 according to World Bank figures. That percentage nearly doubles to 28.9% if data from UNESCAP is cited. The same discrepancy is true for figures for Iran for which the World Bank lists its female participation rate at 16% in 2010 and UNESCAP lists it as 26.9%. It is unclear why these two sources give significantly different numbers as their methodology and definitions of labor force participation were similar.

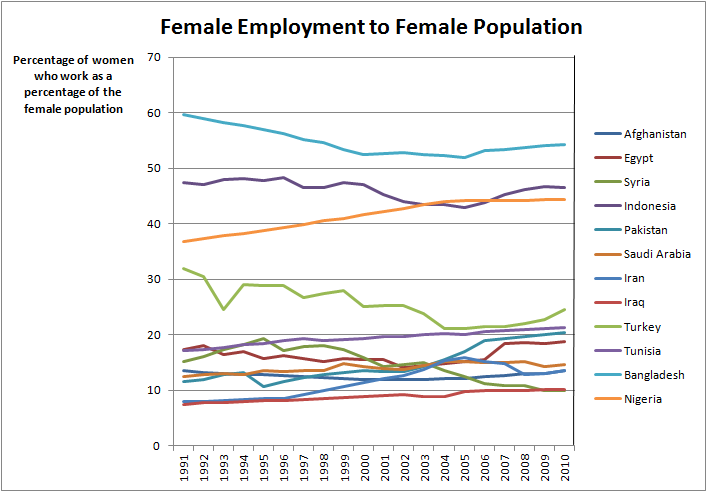
A graph of the percentage of women in 11 Muslim majority populations who are in the labor force relative to the entire population of women in those countries

=== Female-to-male workers ratio ===
Another statistic indicative of female participation in the formal economy of a country is the ratio of female to male workers. As nations develop and their economies both expand and diversify, the expansion of jobs and industries increases this ratio, pushing it toward 1, provided female workers have access to job opportunities and firms, collectively, do not systematically discriminate against female candidates.

Generally speaking, the closer the ratio is to 1, the more gender equal an economy is because neither sex has a disproportionate share of jobs. Bangladesh and Indonesia have the largest ratio of these eleven countries with scores of 0.73 and 0.61, respectively. Nigeria also has a relatively large ratio of female to male workers of 0.51. Despite having twice the percentage of females in the actual labor force, Turkey's female to male laborer ratio is far lower than Iran's, 0.35 to 0.44. Similarly, Syria's ratio is barely smaller than Egypt's (0.27 as compared to 0.30) whereas Egypt's female population has twice the percentage size of formal economic workers as Syria's female labor force. These ratios are compiled and published by the World Economic Forum. The median annual income for female workers in the United States was $36,931 in 2010.

The Forum did not, however, list this information for Afghanistan, Iraq, or Tunisia. It is probable that the ratios are small given the low labor force participation rate of women in these countries and high unemployment rates, but given the uncertain correlation between female labor force participation rate and the ratio of male to female workers, this cannot be stated with any certainty. One possible explanation for the seeming discrepancy is the ratio of females to males in the population. In Syria, for every woman between the ages of 15 and 65, there are 1.03 males.

Since there are more men than women for a limited number of jobs, more men, in absolute terms, are excluded from formal employment. Consequently, the ratio of female to male workers increases because women represent a larger percentage of those who work than they represent the entire labor force. Therefore, women would have a relatively higher ratio of female to male workers than its female labor force participation rate may suggest. The sheer size of the male component of the workforce may be sufficient to create a small ratio of female to male workers.

Table 3: Ratio of Female-to-Male Workers

Country	Afghanistan	Egypt	Syria	Iran	Iraq	Turkey	Indonesia	Tunisia	Pakistan	Bangladesh	Saudi Arabia	Nigeria
2010	-	0.30	0.27	0.44	-	0.35	0.61	-	0.26	0.73	0.23	0.53

Source: Global Gender Gap Report 2012, World Economic Forum

Similar to the ratio of female to male workers in the labor force is the percentage of the actual labor force composed of women. This differs from the labor force participation rate of women because it shows female workers as a percentage of the total number of workers in the economy as opposed to the percentage of the population of women that are involved in the formal economy. A large female labor force participation rate does not necessarily correlate to a substantial percentage of females in the labor force. However, a high female labor force participation rate demonstrates high economic participation by women in a country regardless of the size of the labor market itself that these women compose. Demographics, particularly birth rates, and human capital formation through education, good nutrition, and access to infrastructure and institutions may play a role in the discrepancies between these indicators.

However, as one is a subsect of the other, the two figures generally move collinearly. Despite a lower female labor force participation rate and a smaller female to male worker ratio, Nigeria's female workers represent the largest component, in terms of percentage, of a nation's labor force when compared to the other ten countries. According to the International Labour Organization, 42.84% of the Nigerian labor force is composed of women. Bangladesh and Indonesia are a close second and third with 39.87% and 38.23%, respectively. Iraq, Syria, and Turkey's labor force's female composition rates (14.30%, 15.20%, and 28.69%, respectively) are quite close to their female labor force participation rates which suggests a population parity between men and women. This is interesting as many other Developing countries do not have population parity by gender.

== Female employment characteristics ==
There are a variety of characteristics of female employment such as salary and employment type which are meaningful indicators of female economic participation and female economic stability. These indicators help clarify the economic status women hold in some majority Muslim nations and the permanence of their involvement in the economy. In development economics, great emphasis has been placed on salaried work because it provides a stable source of income.

=== Salaried work ===
Salaried worker, as defined by the International Labour Organization, are "workers who hold the type of jobs defined as 'paid employment job' where the incumbents hold explicit (written or oral), or implicit employment contracts that give them a basic remuneration that is not directly dependent upon the revenue of the unit for which they work." Fundamentally, salaried workers are more likely to be full-time or, even permanent workers. Thus, they are staples of the formal market whereas non-salaried workers are more or less on the fringe of economic activity which relegates them to limited participation in the formal market.

While labor force participation rate sheds light on how many women work in the formal sectors of the economy, it says nothing about the type of work or the stable presence of women in the labor force. Countries such as Bangladesh and Indonesia, when female labor force participation rate or the ratio of male to female workers or similar indicators are considered, appear to have substantial female involvement in their economies. However, very few of the women in these nations have salaried work which means they may go through cycles of short periods of work punctuated by long periods of unemployment. Alternatively, these women may be shuffled from task to task for different employers and never develop a stable basis at a particular firm or within a particular field.

In Bangladesh and Indonesia, two majority Muslim countries with high female labor force participation rates, 11.70% and 31.70% of female workers are salaried, respectively. Perhaps counter intuitively, majority Muslim countries such as Egypt, Iran, Syria, and Tunisia which have low rates of female labor force participation and a relatively small number of actual female laborers have high rates of female salaried employees. In Egypt, 47.9% of employed females have salaried jobs.

In Iran, 46.8% of female workers are salaried and in Tunisia the percentage is 69.1%. Perhaps the most surprising case is Syria where 74.30% of women are salaried. This is the largest percentage in the Middle East and one of the highest in the entire Muslim world.

It is unclear why several nations with few female workers have such a high percentage of salaried women. One possible explanation is that so few women are active in the labor market because the demand for female employment is restricted to a few higher-paying, low-labor-intensive industries. If only a few women are needed but they need to have above-average skills, then these laborers' marginal value may necessitate salary as opposed to simple wages. This information has not been provided by the ILO for Iraq, Saudi Arabia, or Afghanistan.

=== Employers, employees, self-employed ===
Employees and self-employed

Women's role in the economy as employees, employers, or as self-employed labor units is another important characteristic of female labor force participation. In patriarchal societies or rigid (high degree of difficulty for workers to move between industries) labor markets, women are more likely to be employees than employers because they do not have the resources, skills, networks, or opportunities to either be promoted within a firm or to be owners of small or medium-sized enterprises (SMEs). In poor countries, or countries with large swaths of poverty within the population, which many predominantly Muslim nations are or have, the probability of self-employment is greater because women cannot find more established jobs.

There are, however, dozens of reasons why women may be employees, employers, or self-employed that reach beyond basic macroeconomic forces or social norms and conventions. According to the ILO, more than half, 53% of all female workers in Iran are self-employed. In Egypt, slightly fewer women are self-employed than are in Iran. Fifty-two percent of Egyptian female workers have their own business ventures. Bangladesh, Pakistan, and Indonesia have the highest rates of female self-employment with 86.7%, 77.9%, and 68.3%, respectively. Very few women are involved in the formal labor market in Pakistan but more than three fourths of them are self-employed. Nearly half of working women in Turkey are self-employers with 49% of female workers operating their own private enterprise or services. Female economic activity and participation is widely distributed across the Muslim world.

==== Female employers ====
The female labor force participation rate, the ratio of female workers to male workers, the wage security of women, and other elements of formal economic activity cover a large interval across predominantly Muslim nations. However, across most majority Muslim nations, there is a sharp convergence on female employers. With the exception of Turkey, hardly any women are employers in many majority Muslim nations.

In Turkey, 48% of female workers are employers. This statistic suggests that Turkish women hire at least one additional worker for their self-employed commercial enterprises considering that self-employment is the most common form of employment among this demographic group. The second largest percentage of female employers as a percentage of female workers is 3% in Egypt. In Indonesia where 68% of women are self-employed and 38% of the labor force is composed of women, only 1% of these individuals are employers.

One tenth of one percent of female workers in Bangladesh are employers despite the nation's sizable female labor pool. This number is one eighth of the percentage of Syrian women who are employers. Syria has, of course, only one eighth the population of Bangladesh. In majority Muslim countries, very few women and a small percentage of women who do work are employers.

==== Limited economic opportunities ====
Such high rates of self-employment and low rates of females as employers suggest that the economies of Muslim nations provide few formal opportunities for females to work in the private sector. Furthermore, it suggests that even fewer women have the ability to advance within their organization when they do earn work with an established business. High rates of self-employment can be indicative of a gender biased economic system but it can also simply indicate a poorly developed system.

The wide gap between male and female labor force participation rates and ratios, and the gap between male and female employers is indicative of gender inequality within the private sector of majority Muslim countries. However, numerous reasons may account for these outcomes such as weak education infrastructure for women, low levels of economic development, or simply capital-intensive resource development. The latter characteristic is probably given how many majority Muslim nations are net oil exporters.

Table 4: Percentage of Female Laborers as Employer

Country	Afghanistan	Egypt	Syria	Iran	Iraq	Turkey	Indonesia	Tunisia	Pakistan	Bangladesh	Saudi Arabia	Nigeria
2010	-	3.40%	0.80%	0.90%	-	48%	1.3%	0.9%	0.04%	0.10%	-	-

Source: International Labour Organization

=== Female unemployment ===
Unemployment rates among women in majority Muslim countries are high. When aggregated by region, North Africa, the Middle East, and Southeast Asia, the three regions with the most and highest density of Muslims in the world, have the highest rates of female unemployment in the world. In North Africa, 17% of females are unemployed and 16% of women in the Middle East are unemployed.

In both these regions, male unemployment was only 10%. Only Sub-Saharan Africa had a male unemployment rate as high as 10%. Seven percent of women are unemployed in Southeast Asia as compared to 6% of men. South Asia, which contains a few majority Muslim nations such as Bangladesh, has a higher female unemployment rate, 6%, than a male unemployment rate which is 5%. However, non-Muslim regions of the world also demonstrate disproportional employment figures. In Latin America and the Caribbean, the female unemployment rate was 11% in 2006 while the male unemployment rate was only 7%.

In the European Union and other Developed countries such as the United States, female unemployment is higher than male unemployment. In 2006, Seven percent of women in the Developed World were unemployed as compared to 6% of men. Both rates have increased dramatically since the Great Recession but more women are still unemployed than men in these countries. Data demonstrates that a greater proportion of women are unemployed relative to men in majority Muslim countries but that trend is true of several non-Muslim majority regions as well.

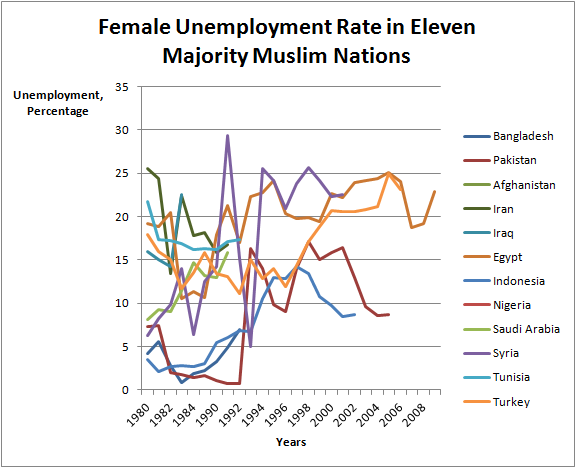

Structural unemployment in Muslim countries seems to be high for women and economic opportunities are limited. Possible explanations for this phenomenon could the same determinants of high self-employment among females and low rates of female employers: low levels of economic development, gendered employment social norms, or capital-intensive industry. This last explanation may be particularly salient in the oil-rich Muslim nations because petroleum exports are capital-intensive and require very high skilled labor which most Muslim women are incapable of providing given low levels of education. The Great Recession has increased unemployment across the board in many Muslim nations and female workers were not left unaffected. According to the World Bank, in 2009, 22.9% of women were unemployed in Egypt.

In Syria in 2010, 22.5% of women were unemployed. This figure has probably increased significantly due to the Syrian civil war. Indonesia, Pakistan, and Bangladesh all had female unemployment levels below 10% which is similar to female unemployment rates in many Developed countries such as the United States. Saudi Arabia, Tunisia, and Iran all have female unemployment rates ranging from 15% to 17%. Female unemployment in Iran may be exacerbated by the collateral effects US, UN, and European sanctions. To what extent this is true is uncertain.

Table 5: Unemployment Rate

Country/Year	2008	2009
Afghanistan	9.5% (2005)	-
Egypt	19.2%	22.9%
Syria	24.2%	2.3%
Iran	16.8%	-
Iraq	22.5% (2006)	-
Turkey	14.3%	13%
Indonesia	9.7%	8.5%
Tunisia	17.5% (2005)	-
Pakistan	8.7%	-
Bangladesh	7.4%	-
Saudi Arabia	13%	15.9%
Nigeria	-	-

Source: World Bank

Turkey has a moderate level of female unemployment relative to other Muslim countries. In 2008, 11.6% of women were unemployed. By 2010, this number crept up to 13.0%. However, long-term employment is a significant portion of female unemployment. In 2010, according to World Bank statistics, 37% of all unemployed women were long-run unemployed workers, or workers who have been out of work for more than one year. Very little data exists on the long-term unemployment rates of women for most nations and for Middle Eastern nations in particular.

== Occupations, opportunities, and wages ==
=== Female employment by economic sector ===
In many economies, women are traditionally funneled into specific occupations or employment fields. A similar trend is also present in the economies of many majority Muslim nation's economies as well. The International Labour Organization, the World Bank, and the UN divide a national economy into three broad categories: agriculture, industry, and services. Agriculture is any work which relates to the primary development of resources for nutritious consumption. According to the UN, whose definitions the ILO, World Bank, and other data collection bases use, agricultural work includes forestry, hunting, and fishing in addition to land cultivation. Industrial employment is involvement in the manufacturing of products from raw materials or work for the purpose of extracting raw materials. This includes mining, quarrying, oil and gas production, construction, and public utilities.

Services-oriented labor revolves around the provision of consumable, non-durable goods and the fulfillment of tasks by an external source for the consumer. This includes wholesale and retail trade and restaurants and hotels; transport, storage, and communications; financing, insurance, real estate, and business services; and community, social, and personal services. Most female laborers in Muslim majority countries work in the agriculture sector but many also work in private service jobs. Few, though some, women are employed in industrial-oriented labor.

Table 6: Female Employment by Sector

Country/Sector	Agriculture	Industry	Services
Afghanistan	-	-	-
Egypt	46%	6%	49%
Syria	25%	9%	66%
Iran	31%	27%	42%
Iraq	51%	4%	46%
Turkey	42%	16%	42%
Indonesia	40%	15%	45%
Tunisia	22.7%	44.1%	32.1%
Pakistan	75%	12%	13%
Bangladesh	68.1%	12.5%	19.4%
Saudi Arabia	0.2%	1%	99%
Nigeria	38.7%	11.2%	47.9%

Source: World Bank

In four of the eleven nations for which there is data, the percentage of female workers who are in the agricultural sector as compared to the percentage of female workers in the services sector. In Turkey, for example, 42% of female workers are employed in the agricultural sector and 42% work in some form of services enterprise. Forty-nine percent of female employees work in agriculture in Egypt as compared to 46% of women who work in the services industry. Saudi Arabia is the only nation in which women play a negligible role agriculture. Tunisian, Nigerian, and Iranian women are more evenly distributed across the economic sectors. Iranian female workers are particularly evenly distributed across all three divisions with 3 of 10 women in agriculture, 4 of 10 in services, and just over one quarter in industry. Saudi Arabian women, on the other hand, are entirely concentrated in the services industry.

==== Agriculture ====
Employment in agriculture is lower-paying and lower-skilled than so called "white collared" jobs. Agriculture is also incredibly labor-intensive. The combination of these characteristics may explain why so many women in majority Muslim countries work in agriculture. Female workers generally have fewer skills than male workers in Developing nations. Literacy rates and school enrollment rate of females are generally low and low relative to men in developing countries of which many majority countries are.

Accordingly, they are not hired for high skill work but they provide an abundant labor source for physical work such as agriculture. However, many majority Muslim nations, including Egypt, Syria, Turkey, Iran, and Saudi Arabia, all of which have varying levels of female participation within their economies, have more than 80% of their female citizens enrolled in secondary education. Nearly all of them are literate as well.

This data somewhat undermines the traditional economic explanation of the concentration of female labor in agriculture. Regardless of the underlying reason for high female participation in agriculture, these workers earn a lower wage than their male counterparts both within this sector and relative to workers in other sectors. This may be one reason for the wide wage gap in some majority Muslim countries.

Female workers in majority Muslim nations are more concentrated in agricultural work than their counterparts in non-majority Muslim nations as well. For nations where data is available, Turkey, Syria, Pakistan, Iran, Indonesia, and Egypt had the highest percentage of female workers involved in agricultural labor than almost every other country. In these nations, anywhere from 20 to 49% of farm workers were female from 1995 to 2005. Over this time period, 50%-69% of farm workers in Turkey, Syria, and Pakistan were women. Only Cambodia, Laos, Ethiopia, Uganda, Tanzania, Zambia, and Madagascar had higher percentages of female agricultural workers.

==== Services and industry ====
The services sector also employs a significant percentage of females and, possibly, for similar reasons. Service jobs such as culinary arts, retail, and administrative work, similar to agriculture, is low-skill, low-paying labor-intensive work. Many bodies are needed to complete generally basic routine tasks. Accordingly, they are more suited to women in developing countries as higher-paying jobs may require a specificity of skills beyond those of the general female laborer and in countries with gender biases.

While the percentage of women working low-skill agriculture and services work is compatible with the notion that women face limited economic opportunities in Muslim nations, data from the ILO does not support or refute that conclusion. Industrial work attracts few women which may be accounted for the physical nature of much industrial work. Furthermore, if women in majority Muslim countries are funneled into agriculture and service-oriented work due to a weak skill set, then it follows that they would not be hired for industrial work as some of it, such as smelting, requires specific vocational skills.

=== Executive positions ===
The glass ceiling is one prevalent concern about the quality of economic opportunity available to women involved in the formal labor market. This phenomenon is the de facto limitation of females' ability to achieve the top levels of leadership in an organization. While the concept is not restricted to the market, it is prevalent in profit-based institutions. With respect to female workers in majority Muslim countries, women are not evenly represented on the board of directors or among the senior management positions of most of the 100 most lucrative companies in the Arab World.

In Egypt, for example, there is only one female senior executive among its five largest commercial enterprises. Orascom Telecom Holding Company, which is the 62nd largest company in the Muslim World (nations whose populations are predominantly Islamic), has one female member of its board of directors. This woman, Elena Shmatova, however, is neither Egyptian nor Muslim which does not suggest opportunity for female advancement. Egypt's other largest firms by revenue, Egyptian General Petroleum Corporation, Suez Canal Authority, Orascom Construction Industries, and Telekom Egypt, do not have a single female member of their board of directors or among their senior management teams.

No women occupy the top leadership positions in the most profitable Iranian businesses either. Iran's three largest companies-National Iranian Oil Company (the second largest in the Muslim World), Iran Khodro, and National Petrochemical Company-also do not have any women in senior leadership positions. This is not surprising as the 2006 Iranian census showed that only 4% of women are in senior executive or management positions. Critics of Iran's radical shia theocratic government may attribute this evidence of limited female economic mobility as a critique of the government's ideology. However, in Turkey, which is a secular state governed by a moderate Islamic party, women comprised only 8% of managers in the labor force in 2007. Regardless of the official status of Islam or the ideology of the ruling party, there exists some evidence of a glass ceiling for women in the private sector.

Eleven of the Muslim world's largest businesses are located in Indonesia. These firms include automotive giant Astra International, Bank Rakyat Indonesia, and electric service provider Perusahaan Listrik Negara. Of these eleven firms, seven of them have at least one female member of the board of directors or a female in a senior executive management position. However, only Gudang Garam, a massive cigarette manufacturer, and Pertamina, the largest company in Indonesia, have 2 female members on the board of commissioners. Pertamina is owned and operated by Japanese, not Indonesian, executives, however, and none of its female leaders are Muslim or Indonesian.

== Claims of gender inequality in the Muslim world ==
Majority Muslim countries have been criticized for implementing policies which perpetuate gender inequality. Limits on the economic rights of women under the rule of law are present in several Muslim nations. In Saudi Arabia, for example, women are allowed to work but their formal employment cannot interfere with her duties as a homemaker. Saudi female workers must also travel with male companions, and they cannot work unless their husbands or guardians approve.

=== Claims that Islam promotes gender inequality ===
Sociologists Helen Rizzo, Abdel-Hamid Abdel-Latif, and Katherine Meyer explored cultural attitudes in majority Muslim countries subdivided by Arab and non-Arab. The Arab states studied were Egypt, Saudi Arabia, Algeria, Morocco, and Jordan while the non-Arab nations were Turkey, Bangladesh, Pakistan, Nigeria, and Indonesia. To be Arab nations, states had to be members of the Arab League and recognize Arabic as the official language. Of these states, Rizzo et al. found that the Arab states were significantly less pro-gender equality and opportunity for women than the non-Arab states despite their shared Islamic faith.

However, neither group of countries was pro-gender equality in the sense that policies aimed at equal rights between the sexes are popular. In Arab countries, 82% of survey respondents believe that a man has more right to a job than a woman while 63% of respondents from the non-Arab countries felt the same way. These researchers attributed these attitudes to the strong religious identity and adherence of respondents thus implicating Islam in promoting gender inequality in majority Muslim nations.

=== Denials that Islam promotes gender inequality ===
Academic literature is mixed on this subject, however. Some scholars do not believe that gender inequality in majority Muslim states is a product of Islam. Feminist sociologist Valentine Moghadam has written extensively on gender inequality, including employment inequality, in the Muslim World.

According to Moghadam, women are victims of clear political, economic, and social disparities in many Islamic countries which create gender distinctions within the public and private spheres. This inhibits the ability of women to participate in the government or to advance in the private sector. Moghadam specifically points to low female labor force participation across the board in Muslim states as a sign of gender inequality as do other scholars (Youseff 1978, Sivard 1985).

However, she does not believe that Islam is the root cause of gender inequality in the Muslim World because it is implemented differently in different countries, the status of women in the Muslim World is varied, and numerous other factors (state ideology, economic development, urbanization, etc.) affect gender equality. She points at that certain views which are considered by critics of Islam to be indicative of a gender-biased theology are present in other religions. Viewing women as mothers and daughters first and foremost, for example, is also a common belief among Orthodox Jews according to Moghadam.

Many cultures divide occupations along gender lines such as teaching and education administration or nursing and doctors. Why are Muslim nations singled out for holding similar gender biases as non-Muslim nations, asks Moghadam. She does state, however, that the presence of fundamentalist Islamic voices in influential positions in states such as Iran, Afghanistan, and Pakistan has helped perpetuate institutionalized gender disparities. Iran, in particular, provides little economic opportunity for women which has resulted in limited participation in the formal economy. In 1986, for example, 11 million women were not counted in the labor force because the Iranian regime deemed them to be "homemakers." Many women, particularly agricultural workers, do not receive wages frequently, which marginalizes them as economic actors.

=== Claims that Radical Islam promotes gender inequality ===
Ziba Mir-Hosseini takes a middle path on the question of Islam and gender equality as do many other theorists. Hosseieni is a visiting school at New York University Law school. Hosseini argues that the faith of Islamic and general principles promote gender equality. According to Hosseini, theocratic Islamic regimes which conflate theocracy with democracy, such as Iran or Afghanistan under the Taliban, create a tension which reinforces fundamentalist, reactionary thinking. This in turn leads to the repression of women. She argues that it is not that majority Muslim nations are intrinsically predisposed to gender inequality, it is that ultra conservative regimes are. This is also occurring in Iraq under Prime Minister Nouri al-Maliki. Hosseini points to "Islamic feminism" as proof of Islam's inherent compatibility with gender equality and a sign that Muslim states will progress toward gender equality while remaining Islamic in character. A patriarchal interpretation of Islam must be defeated, not Islam itself, argues Hosseini.

== Gender equality and the formal labor market ==
=== Estimated earned income ===
Gender equality in the workplace is a major concern of many social activists, public officials, and academics, among others. Even in Developed Countries and wealthy democracies such as the United States there is concern of gender inequities in economic mobility for women. American President Barack Obama's Lilly Ledbetter Fair Pay Act was passed in response to concerns among Americans that women were receiving lower wages for equal work. Wages and wage equality with men are two common indicators of gender equality and opportunity within a formal market. Higher aggregate wages indicate that females are holding more productive, valued jobs which is considered indicative of social progress. Equal pay with men demonstrates a neutrality to gender within the workplace and may suggest functional fairness between female workers and their male counterparts. Given these two indicators, wage statistics suggest that gender equality in terms of economic participation and the quality of formal economic opportunities are not high in many predominantly Muslim nations. In 2011, the World Economic Forum gathered information about the estimated earned income of women in 135 countries. Of these countries, Syria placed 134th in terms of earned annual income for women.

Egypt finished 126th, Iran was 130th, Pakistan was 131st, and Saudi Arabia was 132nd. Even countries such as Bangladesh, Indonesia, and Turkey, which have substantially larger and higher-status female participation in their economies, placed 90th, 112th, and 121st, respectively, in terms of earned annual income for female laborers. Several poorer and more volatile states in Sub-Saharan Africa outperformed these nations. The estimated annual income of these women were, in terms of U.S. dollars' purchasing power parity, quite low and only a fraction of their male counterparts' wages.

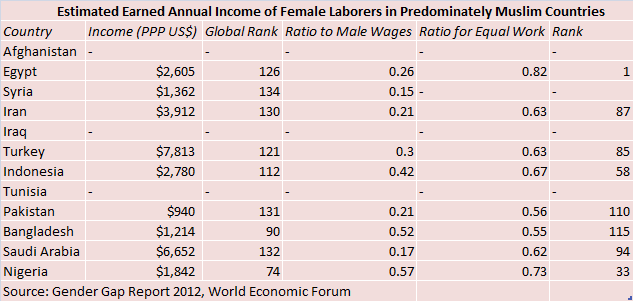
The Estimated Earned Income of Women in 11 Muslim Majority Countries

Turkey and Saudi Arabia award women the highest annual incomes when adjusted for purchasing power parity in terms of U.S. dollars. Female workers in Turkey are estimated by the World Economic Forum to earn $7,813 while Saudi female workers earn $6,652. Women in Pakistan don't even earn $1,000 for a year's worth of labor ($940) Egyptian, Syrian, Indonesian, Nigerian, and Bangladeshi women earn less, far less for some countries (Syria, Bangladesh, Nigeria), than $3,000 annually. The median annual income for female workers in the United States was $36,931 in 2010.

Women in these countries earn very low wages when compared to men from the same country. Out of 11 of the most populated and economically significant Muslim majority nations (Saudi Arabia, Egypt, Iran, Iraq, Turkey, Syria, Tunisia, Nigeria, Indonesia, Pakistan, and Bangladesh) only two nations, Bangladesh and Nigeria have a gender wage gap below 50%. In Nigeria, women earn 57 cents to the dollar of a man, according to the World Economic Forum's Gender Gap Report 2012. Women in Bangladesh earn 52% of their males counterparts' wage. In Syria, women only earn 15% of a man's wage.

These large disparities in income size and relative size to men in addition to low overall labor involvement, few salaried positions, and high levels of unemployment suggest that these nations' economies perpetuate significant gender disparities. However, low wages and large wage gaps can be explained by the different types of work men and women perform in these countries. If women are hired for mostly low-skill, low-wage work which is less productive and less elastic in demand than the work of most men, then their wages should be low and be significantly smaller than men's wages. Furthermore, a large supply of female labor for the few jobs women do work in these various economies may be depressing wages.

=== Wage gap ===
Low wages in absolute terms and low wages relative to men's wages in the aggregate, however, do not provide a full picture of gender economic equity. The ratio of income for women to men for equal work is another significant financial indicator of economic gender equality. Using this metric, these countries, collectively, are moderately equal relative to the majority of the world. The World Economic Forum's 2012 Gender Report found that women in Iran, Turkey, Indonesia, and Saudi Arabia all received approximately 60% of the wages of a male for the same work.

Respectively, these nations were ranked 87th, 85th, 58th, and 94th in the world out of 135. While not terribly equal, these nations were not too far behind the median nation. Egypt, however, is the most gender equal country in terms of equal pay. The World Economic Forum found that Egyptian women receive 82% of the income of their true male counterparts, not of men in general. No other nation's women earn as high an income percentage as that.

=== World Economic Forum economic participation and Opportunity subindex ===
Global Gender Gap Index

An additional measurement of gender inequality is the World Economic Forum global gender gap index which it measures for 135 countries each year and publishes its results in its Gender Gap Report. Its statistic is known as the Global Gender Gap Index. The index measures gender disparities in economic, political, health, and educational spheres and uses corresponding criteria.

The GGGI utilizes four sub-indices to measure these four spheres of inequality and to create a composite metric of gender inequality. The four sub-indices are: economic participation and opportunity, educational attainment, health and survival, and political empowerment. The economic participation and opportunity subindex "is captured through three concepts: the participation gap, the remuneration gap and the advancement gap. The participation gap is captured using the difference in labour force participation rates. The remuneration gap is captured through a hard data indicator (ratio of estimated female-to-male earned income) and a qualitative variable calculated through the World Economic Forum’s Executive Opinion Survey (wage equality for similar work). Finally, the gap between the advancement of women and men is captured through two hard data statistics (the ratio of women to men among legislators, senior officials and managers, and the ratio of women to men among technical and professional workers)."

The index is measured on a scale of 0 to 1 with 1 indicating a perfectly equal level of participation in the labor market between men and women and equal economic opportunities and o indicating complete inequality. Of the 135 nations analyzed, Pakistan (134), Syria (132), and Saudi Arabia (131) are in the bottom five countries for female labor force participation and for the provision of labor opportunities for women.

Table 7: Economic Participation and Opportunity

Country	Afghanistan	Egypt	Syria	Iran	Iraq	Turkey	Indonesia	Tunisia	Pakistan	Bangladesh	Saudi Arabia	Nigeria
GGI Score (Rank)	-	0.5975 (126)	0.5626 (132)	0.5927 (127)	-	0.6015 (124)	0.6591 (97)	-	0.5478 (134)	0.6684 (86)	0.5731 (131)	0.6315 (110)

Source: Global Gender Report 2012, World Economic Forum

The GGGI is a comprehensive index relative to other measures of gender inequality such as the Gender Inequality Index produced by the United Nations. One serious critique of the index, however, is that the measurement of a country's gender equality is too dependent on income. While the ratio of income between men and women is taken into account, over reliance on financial data may benefit more Developed countries by virtue of having larger economies which can accommodate higher wages. The multiple subsections of the index, however, aim to condition the final measurement of economic participation and opportunity with emphasis on the ratio of wages, job advancement, and other metrics of females to males. This methodology quantifies gender inequality by analyzing the gap between males and females instead of absolute measurements.

=== UN Gender Inequality Index ===
The most frequently cited indicator of gender inequality is the United Nations' Gender Inequality Index, or GII. It was adopted in 2010 because the Gender Development Index did not measure gender inequality directly. It measured female development. The Gender Empowerment Measurement was replaced as well due to its overemphasis of income. As a consequence of this methodological construction, the GEM overestimated gender inequality in poor countries. Consequently, the GII was adopted to address these flaws and to be a true measure of inequality and not a proxy indicator. Income is not a component of the GII and the three categories are weighed equally to present a balance assessment of gender equality. The GII covers three broad categories of female disadvantage: reproductive health, empowerment, and labor market status.

The purpose of the index is to demonstrate the loss of human development due to inequalities between men and women. The three categories are measured with the following metrics. Reproductive health is measured by the maternal mortality rate and the adolescent fertility rate. Empowerment is indicated by the share of parliamentary seats held by each sex and secondary and higher education levels of each sex. Finally, the labor market aspect of the GII is measured by women's participation rate in the workforce. Mathematically, it is the approximated loss of human development to women due to inequality.

Philosophically and methodologically, the GII is based on and, in some sense, a subindicator of the Human Development Index. Scores for nations are on a scale of 0 to 1 where 0 is pure gender equality and 1 is pure gender inequality. GII is measured in a similar manner as the Inequality-adjusted Human Development Index. According to the UN, IHDI is "based on a distribution-sensitive class of composite indices proposed by Foster, Lopez-Calva, and Szekely (2005), which draws on the Atkinson (1970) family of inequality measures. It is computed as the geometric mean of dimension indices adjusted for inequality. The inequality in each dimension is estimated by the Atkinson inequality measure, which is based on the assumption that a society has a certain level of aversion to inequality."

Table 8: United Nations Gender Inequality Index

Year/Country	Afghanistan	Egypt	Syria	Iran	Iraq	Turkey	Indonesia	Tunisia	Pakistan	Bangladesh	Saudi Arabia	Nigeria
2005	0.709	0.599	0.497	0.494	0.529	0.515	0.549	0.335	0.611	0.598	0.682	-
2008	0.695	0.578	0.505	0.459	-	0.576	0.443	0.524	0.326	0.0.600	0.686	-
2011	0.707	-	0.474	0.485	-	0.579	0.443	0.505	0.293	0.550	0.646	-

Source: United Nations

The median GII score for the global community is 0.463. When divided by regions, the Arab States have the third worst GII score of 0.555. This score is only superior to the scores of Sub-Saharan Africa (0.577) and South Asia (0.568). While not all encompassing and inclusive of other religious and cultural groups, these three regions, particularly the Arab States and South Asia, are inhabited by large Muslim populations. Afghanistan, Pakistan, Iran, Iraq, Turkey, Syria, Saudi Arabia, Egypt, Indonesia, and Bangladesh all have GII scores above the median. Only Tunisia's score (0.293) is below the median. However, it is significantly below the median.

Gender inequality, however, is not increasing or decreasing in a collinear fashion among these predominantly Muslim states. In Afghanistan, for example, gender inequality, as measured by the index, improved by 2% from 2005 to 2008 but then declined by 2% from 2008 to 2011. In Iraq, the GII score jumped by 9% from 2005 to 2008 but then leveled off in 2011. Turkey, Indonesia, Tunisia, and Pakistan have seen consistent improves to gender equality since 2005. Due to the broad, general nature of the indicators, the minimal and narrow data used to compile the three categories which compose the indicator, and innumerable political and socio-economic issues which may increase or decrease gender inequality, nothing definitive can be said about the level of gender inequality or its growth trend in many predominantly Muslim nations.

== See also ==
- Women in Islam
- History of Islamic economics
- Female slavery in the Muslim world
