= List of Seventh-day Sabbath-keeping churches =

The seventh-day Sabbatarians observe and re-establish the Bible's Sabbath commandment, including observances running from Friday sunset to Saturday sunset, similar to Jews and the early Christians. Many of these groups observe the Sabbath by picking up practices from modern Rabbinic Judaism.

== List of churches and movements ==
- Adventism
- Baptists
- British Israelism/Armstrongism
- Jewish Christianity
- Latter Day Saint movement
- Pentecostalism
- Schwarzenau Brethren

=== Adventism ===
- Seventh-day Adventist Church
- Adventist Church of Promise
- Churches of God (Seventh-Day)
- Creation Seventh Day Adventist Church
- Sabbath Rest Advent Church
- Sacred Name Movement
- Seventh Day Adventist Reform Movement
  - International Missionary Society of Seventh-Day Adventist Church Reform Movement
  - True and Free Seventh-day Adventists
- Shepherd's Rod (Davidian Seventh-day Adventists)
- United Sabbath-Day Adventist Church
- United Seventh-Day Brethren

=== Baptists ===
- Seventh Day Baptists

=== British Israelism/Armstrongism ===
- Church of God International (United States)
- Church of God Preparing for the Kingdom of God
- Church of the Great God
- Global Church of God
- House of Yahweh
- Intercontinental Church of God
- Living Church of God
- Philadelphia Church of God
- Restored Church of God
- United Church of God

=== Jewish Christianity ===
- Assemblies of Yahweh
- Evangelical Association of the Israelite Mission of the New Universal Covenant (AEMINPU)
- Hebrew Roots movement
- Makuya
- Messianic Judaism, some Messianic Jews observe Shabbat on Saturdays
- Sacred Name Movement
- Subbotniks, the majority belonged to Rabbinic and Karaite Judaism, the minority to Christianity
- Yehowists, a Russian Spiritual Christian millenarian movement founded in the 1840s

=== Latter Day Saint movement ===
- Church of Christ (Fettingite)
- Church of Israel
- Church of Jesus Christ of Latter Day Saints (Strangite)
- House of Aaron

=== Pentecostalism ===
- Church of God at Jerusalem Acres (the U.S.-origin body, founded in 1957 with headquarters in Cleveland, Tennessee)
- Evangelical Christians-Sabbatarians baptized by the Holy Spirit (a Oneness denomination, formed in the 1920s–1930s in the Western Ukraine, Poland)
- Nazareth Baptist Church
- Soldiers of the Cross Church
- True Jesus Church

=== Schwarzenau Brethren ===
- Seventh Day German Baptist Church (a branch which incorporated in 1814)

=== Other ===
- Ancient Foundations Bible Fellowship, Port Macquarie
- Black Hebrew Israelites
  - African Hebrew Israelites of Jerusalem
  - Church of God and Saints of Christ
    - Church of God and Saints of Christ (Orthodox Christianity)
  - Commandment Keepers
- For His Glory Church Ministries, Inc.
- Founded in Truth Fellowship
- Jemaat Allah Global Indonesia (JAGI), internationally known as Unitarian Christian Church of Indonesia (UCCI), headquartered in Semarang, Central Java, Indonesia
- World Mission Society Church of God
