= Church of God =

Church of God is a name used by numerous denominational bodies. The largest denomination with this name is the Church of God (Cleveland, Tennessee).

== Adventist Churches of God ==
- Church of God General Conference (Church of God of the Abrahamic Faith, CoGGC)
- Church of the Blessed Hope (Church of God of the Abrahamic Faith, CGAF)
- Church of God (Seventh-Day) (CoG7)

== Anabaptist ==
- Church of God in Christ, Mennonite
- Church of God (New Dunkers)

== Armstrongism ==
- Grace Communion International, formerly the Worldwide Church of God, which has repudiated virtually all Armstrongist beliefs starting in the late 1980s
- Church of God International (United States), based in Tyler, Texas
- Church of God Preparing for the Kingdom of God
- Church of the Great God, based in Charlotte, North Carolina
- Global Church of God, based in the UK, affiliated with the Church of the Eternal God (U.S.) and the Church of God, a Christian Fellowship, (Canada)
- Intercontinental Church of God, based in Tyler, Texas
- Living Church of God, based in Charlotte, North Carolina
- Philadelphia Church of God, based in Edmond, Oklahoma
- Restored Church of God, based in Wadsworth, Ohio
- United Church of God, based in Milford, Ohio
- Church of God, a Worldwide Association, separated from United Church of God in 2010

== Baptist ==
- Christian Baptist Church of God
- Churches of God General Conference (Winebrenner) (CGGC), of John Winebrenner
- Ohio Valley Association of the Christian Baptist Churches of God

== Brethren ==
- The Churches of God in the Fellowship of the Son of God, the Lord Jesus Christ, also known as Needed Truth Brethren

== Wesleyan holiness movement ==
- Church of God (Anderson, Indiana)
- Church of God (Guthrie, Oklahoma)
- Church of God (Restoration)
- Church of God (Holiness)

== Pentecostal movement ==
- Church of God (Cleveland, Tennessee), the largest denomination with this name
- Church of God (Huntsville, Alabama)
- Church of God (Jerusalem Acres)
- Church of God for All Nations
- Church of God in Christ
- Church of God by Faith
- Church of God, House of Prayer
- Church of God Mountain Assembly
- Church of God of the Original Mountain Assembly
- Church of God of the Union Assembly
- Church of God of Prophecy
- Church of God with Signs Following (best known for their open practice of snake handling)
- The Church of God (Charleston, Tennessee)
- The Church of God, Alexander Jackson Sr. General Overseer
- The (Original) Church of God (Chattanooga, Tennessee)
- Original Church of God or Sanctified Church, (Nashville, Tennessee)
- Apostolic Overcoming Holy Church of God
- Fire Baptized Holiness Church of God of the Americas
- Indian Pentecostal Church of God, (Eluru and Kerala, India)
- New Testament Christian Churches of America, (New Testament Church of God)
- Pentecostal Church of God, (Bedford, Texas)
- Redeemed Christian Church of God, (Nigeria)

== Nontrinitarian sects ==
- Members Church of God International, with its headquarters in Apalit, Pampanga, Philippines

== Other denominations ==
- The Church of Jesus Christ of Latter-day Saints, in its origination period in the early 1830s named "Church of God" after "Church of Jesus Christ" and before today's name in 1834
- La Luz del Mundo, a church founded in Mexico in 1926. Officially named the "Church of the Living God, Pillar and Ground of the Truth, The Light of the World"
- Churches of God General Conference (Winebrenner) Revival movement out of Reformed Churches in early 1800s
- World Mission Society Church of God: a church founded in South Korea in 1964

== See also ==
- Church of Christ
