= Global Church of God =

Sabbatarian church based in England

- Classification: Independent Christian, or Restorationist
- Leader: Norbert Link & Brian Gale
- Region: International
- Headquarters: England
- Founder: Roderick C. Meredith
- Origin: 1992; San Diego, California
- Separated from: Worldwide Church of God
- Separations: Living Church of God

The Global Church of God (GCG) is a Sabbatarian church based in England. It was founded in Glendora, CA in 1992 by Roderick C. Meredith. Following the dissolution of most church operations in the United States, GCG's operations shifted to the United Kingdom and reestablished a presence in North America under new organizational identities.

== History and background ==
Roderick C. Meredith had been a minister in the Worldwide Church of God (WCG) for 40 years. He established GCG in response to a number of major doctrinal shifts in WCG. GCG is one of the many Sabbatarian Churches of God to form after WCG's 1995 schism.

Herbert W. Armstrong had founded the WCG as a radio ministry (originally called the Radio Church of God) in 1934. Over the next 50 years, the church developed an international presence through The Plain Truth magazine, The World Tomorrow radio and television programs, and three campuses of Ambassador College in the U.S. and England. The WCG taught certain controversial doctrines, including observance of selected Mosaic laws as outlined in the first five books of the Bible (similar to aspects of Judaism) but held to repentance, baptism and the testimony of Jesus Christ as taught in the New Testament.

Armstrong died in 1986 and was succeeded by Joseph W. Tkach. Under Tkach, WCG adopted a theology in line with historic and mainstream Christianity. During that period of change, many members left WCG, including many ministers who began their own churches in an effort to remain loyal to Armstrong's teachings. GCG was just one among these Sabbatarian Churches of God.

Similar in fashion to Armstrong's approach, Meredith and the GCG established a magazine and television program, both under the name The World Ahead.

== Governance and new affiliations ==
GCG experienced an upheaval of its own after a dispute between Meredith and the church board over governance issues in 1998. More information about that upheaval, which resulted in a major split in the CGC, can be understood from "An Open Letter From The Council of Elders" (dated 4 Dec., 1998). In that letter, (signed by Roderick C. Meredith, Carl McNair, Richard Ames, Dibar Apartian, Charles Bryce and John Ogwyn) it stated that in late Nov. 1998, "the Board of Directors made the most far-reaching decisions since the inception of Global. They had meetings which culminated with the firing of Global's founder and Presiding Evangelist, Dr. Roderick C. Meredith." It was a dramatic action which, that letter stated, was taken totally apart from any counsel, or advice, from Global's Council of Elders. "In the bylaws of the Church it is stated that the purpose of the Council of Elders is to give advice to the Board and to the Presiding Evangelist and to help guide the overall direction of the Work in all spiritual and administration matters. At the time of these Board meetings there were eleven functioning members of the Council, five of which were also members of the Board. The Council's membership had been reduced by two in the preceding week. This was first due to the Council's previous action on November 11 suspending Dave Pack from the Council and secondly due to the tragic and untimely death of Colin Adair on November 15. Mr. Pack's suspension had come after an all-day hearing ending at 7:30 PM on Wednesday, November 11. The hearing and suspension were triggered by serious charges brought against Mr. Pack by church members in Michigan. Mr. Pack was present in the room for discussion of the charges. Prior to its Wednesday adjournment the Council decided, with ten members concurring and two abstaining, to suspend Mr. Pack.

Earlier, eight members of the Council had agreed that an outright expulsion of Mr. Pack from the Council was in order. The only three men present in the room to object to Mr. Pack's expulsion were Raymond McNair, Larry Salyer, and Edwin Pope. They were a very distinct minority in the Council meeting that Wednesday. However, when the Board met following Colin Adair's death these three then constituted a majority of the five member Board.

When their Friday meeting began (Nov. 20), a motion was made to remove Carl McNair from the Board (though no charges of misconduct were made against him). Since the motion involved Carl McNair, he couldn't participate in the decision and his expulsion was accomplished by agreement of three out of the four participants (Mr. Meredith strongly dissented from this action). The next decision was to fill Mr. McNair's place by the appointment of Norbert Link, the lawyer. Total control of the Board was now gained by this tiny minority of the Council. If there was a genuine desire to abide by the spirit and intent of the bylaws, why was the Council totally bypassed and left out of the loop in this most important and far reaching of decisions?"

The six Elders who signed stated that they comprised "the majority of the Council of Elders as constituted at the time of the Board action". Their letter made protest that the Board's actions were made without their advice and contrary to their wishes. They called for the "minority who gained control of the corporate entity, Global Church of God, through political stratagems to step down and hand back over corporate control to Dr. Meredith and the leadership which is supported by the vast majority of ministers and members." As that was never done, Meredith found it necessary to leave and went on to form the Living Church of God, based in San Diego, California (which in 2003 was moved to Charlotte, North Carolina).

Membership in GCG declined to the point that it ceased operations under that name in the United States. Most U.S. members either affiliated with Meredith's new church or were later absorbed into the United Church of God, which had split from WCG in 1995.

Administrative affairs for GCG shifted to the church's office in the United Kingdom. The GCG re-established a presence in the U.S. as The Church of the Eternal God and in Canada as the Church of God, a Christian Fellowship.

Groups that formed out of the GCG breakup in 1998:

- Affiliated with the Global Church of God:
  - Church of God, A Christian Fellowship (CGCF): Formed when the U.S. operations of GCG dissolved. The CGCF later merged with the United Church of God (UCG) and likewise ceased operations in the U.S. However, CGCF's Canadian office continued to operate in affiliation with the GCG in England. Based in Summerland, British Columbia.
  - Church of the Eternal God (CEG): Led in the U.S. by a group of ministers who resisted the merger of CGCF with UCG. Based in San Diego, California, CEG is affiliated with GCG in the United Kingdom and CGCF in Canada.
- Not affiliated with the Global Church of God:
  - Restored Church of God (RCG): Led by David C. Pack and based in Wadsworth, Ohio. Publishes The Real Truth magazine and a host of booklets and publications available on the RCG website.
  - Living Church of God (LCG): Led by Roderick C. Meredith, former chairman of GCG's board. Publishes Tomorrow's World magazine and produces a telecast under the same name. Based in Charlotte, North Carolina.
  - Church of God Fellowship: Led by minister Harold Smith and based in Spokane, Washington, with an office in Canada.
  - Sabbath Church of God: Led by Warren Zehrung and based in Little Rock, Arkansas. Produces The Proclamation of Jesus Christ radio program.
  - Church of God, 21st Century: Was led by the late Raymond F. McNair, a former board member of both GCG and the CGCF. Based in Temecula, California.
  - Herbert W Armstrong Library (HWALibrary.com): Historical library and archive of the teachings of the Worldwide Church of God under the direction of Herbert W Armstrong

== See also ==
- Restorationism
- Christian observances of Jewish holidays
- Christian views on the Old Covenant
- Armstrongism
