= Armstrongism =

Religious teachings and doctrines of Herbert W. Armstrong

Herbert W. Armstrong

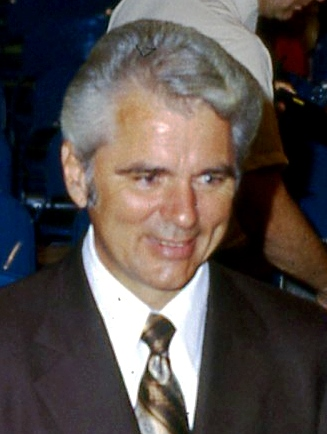
Garner Ted Armstrong (1979)

Armstrongism refers to the teachings and doctrines of Herbert W. Armstrong while leader of the Worldwide Church of God (WCG). His teachings are professed by him and his followers to be the restored true Gospel of the Bible. Armstrong said these teachings were prophetically revealed by God during his study of the Bible and claimed that God personally granted him the "master key" to unlock the Scriptures. The term Armstrongite is sometimes used to refer to those that follow Armstrong's teachings. Armstrongism and Armstrongite are generally considered derogatory by those to whom it is applied, who prefer to be known as members of the Church of God (COG). These doctrines were also espoused by his sons Richard David Armstrong (until his death in 1958) and Garner Ted Armstrong (until his death in 2003) with slight variations.

Herbert Armstrong's teachings have similarities to those of the Millerites and Church of God (Seventh Day) (sometimes referred to as "COG7" to differentiate it from similarly styled sects named "Church of God" which worship on Sunday and generally hold to traditional Christian teachings), from which WCG is spiritually and organizationally descended. The religion is a blend of Christian fundamentalism, non-belief in the Trinity and some tenets of Judaism and Seventh-Day Sabbath doctrine. Armstrong himself had been a COG7 minister before the Oregon conference stripped him of his ministerial credentials and excommunicated him for his seeking to "water down" and change their long-established COG7 doctrines. It was in the fall of 1937 when Elder Armstrong's credentials were revoked by the Salem Church of God organization. The reason given by the Board of Twelve Oregon Conference of the Church of God, 7th Day (COG7) for this adverse action against Herbert W. Armstrong, was because he taught and kept the annual Feast days. But the real reason seems to have been because of his uncooperative attitude. Armstrong then began his own ministry.

Armstrong taught that most of the basic doctrines and teachings of mainstream Christianity were based on traditions, including absorbed pagan concepts and rituals (i.e. religious syncretism), rather than the Judeo-Christian Bible. His teachings have consequently been the source of much controversy. Shortly after Armstrong's death in 1986, the Worldwide Church of God started revising its core beliefs toward the concepts, doctrines, and creeds of mainstream Christianity. This resulted in many ministers and members leaving the WCG to start or join other churches, many of which continue to believe and teach Armstrong's doctrines to one degree or another. In 2009, the WCG changed its name to Grace Communion International (GCI). Today, the official doctrinal position of GCI is mainstream evangelical, although there are still GCI ministers and members who do not fully embrace all of the changes.

== Doctrinal differences ==
Some of Armstrong's identifiable doctrines are in addition to or are different from traditional mainstream Christian doctrines. Many groups and churches which splintered in the aftermath of doctrinal changes within the Worldwide Church of God continue to hold many or all of these teachings of Armstrong.

=== God Family ===
The God Family doctrine holds that the Godhead is not limited to God (the Creator) alone, or even to a trinitarian God, but is a divine family into which every human who ever lived may be spiritually born, through a master plan being enacted in stages. The Godhead now temporarily consists of two co-eternal individuals (see Binitarianism), Jesus the Messiah, as the creator and spokesman (The Word or Logos), and God the Father.

According to this doctrine, humans who are called by God's Holy Spirit to repentance, who [accept], hope to inherit, the gift of eternal life made possible by Jesus' sacrifice, who commit to live by "every word of God" (i.e. biblical scripture), and who "endure to the end" (i.e. remain faithful to live according to God's way of life until either the end of their own lifetime or the second coming of Jesus) would, at Jesus' return, be "born again" into the family of God as the literal spiritual offspring or children of God. Armstrong drew parallels between every stage of human reproduction and this spiritual reproduction. He often stated that "God is reproducing after his own kind— children in his own image." Whatever the changes brought about by this new entrance of humans into God's family, God the Father will always be the omnipotent sovereign and sustainer of both the universe and the spiritual realm, forever to be worshipped as God by the children of God. Jesus, as the creator of the universe and the savior of God's children, will always rule the Kingdom of God, which will ultimately grow to fill the entire universe, and he likewise will forever be worshipped as God by the children of God.

=== Church's authority ===
Armstrong taught that the Bible (excluding the Biblical apocrypha and the deuterocanonical books) is the authoritative Word of God (The Proof of the Bible). He taught that even though the Bible's message is inerrant, it had been distorted as the result of many conflicting interpretations of it, and the Gospel's full message of the Kingdom of God as it was understood by the original apostles was not restored until the 20th century, when God opened Armstrong's mind to the plain truth of scripture and revealed the Gospel's full message of the Kingdom of God to the Church through him (Armstrong). Armstrong taught that all other churches which called themselves "Christian" churches were not merely apostate churches, they were actually counterfeit churches because their histories could be traced back to the first century, and they are also described as false churches in the epistles (which refer to a "false gospel", "false ministers", and "false apostles"), the eighth chapter of the Book of Acts (the appropriation of "Christian" trappings by influential and ambitious pagan religious figures [including a man known to secular history, Simon Magus, mentioned in Acts]) and later historians like Eusebius.

=== Sabbatarianism and other Old Testament beliefs ===
The observance of the Sabbath from dusk on Friday to dusk on Saturday was the first non-traditional religious practice (as compared to mainstream Christianity). In several of his books, Armstrong wrote that after his wife Loma met a member of a Sabbatarian church group (the Church of God (Seventh Day)), she challenged him to use scripture to prove that Sunday was the proper day for Christian worship, as Herbert claimed. After months of Bible study, Armstrong concluded that there was no sound scriptural basis for Christian worship on Sunday, instead, he asserted that for decades after the establishment of the Church age, the Apostles and the first generation of Christians, both Jewish and Gentile converts, continued to set an example for all Christians by observing the Sabbath on the seventh day of the week (from Friday at sunset to Saturday at sunset).

Eventually, Armstrong accepted and observed many principles and laws which are found in the Old Testament and he also taught converts to do the same. These principles and laws included the Ten Commandments, dietary laws, tithing, and the celebration of high Sabbaths, or annual feast days such as Passover, Pentecost, and the Feast of Tabernacles. Furthermore, he taught that Christians should not celebrate Christmas and Easter, based on his belief that these holidays were not of biblical origin, instead, he believed that the celebration of them originated as the result of later absorptions of pagan practices into corrupted Christianity.

=== British Israelism ===
Armstrong was a proponent of a form of British Israelism (also known as Anglo-Israelism), which is the belief that people of Western European descent, especially the British Empire (Ephraim) and the United States (Manasseh), are descended from the "Ten Lost Tribes" of Israel. It is also asserted that the German peoples are descended from the ancient Assyrians. Armstrong believed that this doctrine provided a "key" to understanding biblical prophecy, and he also believed that God called him to proclaim these prophecies to the "lost tribes" of Israel before the coming of the "end-times". Grace Communion International, the lineal successor to Armstrong's original church, no longer teaches the doctrine, but many offshoot churches continue to teach it even though critics assert that British Israelism is inconsistent with the findings of modern genetics.

=== Other teachings ===
- God will soon set up his government on earth, under the rule of Jesus, at Jesus' Second Coming. He will rescue humanity from sin and self-annihilation, inspire mankind to voluntarily turn to God's law, and usher in a 1000 year period of peace, prosperity, and justice. Humanity will be under the rule of the children of God, who are the biblical saints and faithful members of the Worldwide Church of God, "born again" as spirit in the first resurrection, when Jesus returns to the Earth.
- Non-believers are not yet eternally judged, having a future opportunity for salvation after a mortal resurrection (the second resurrection).
- The vast majority of all people who have ever lived will be saved; thus, the relatively small number of true Christians of this age are predestined to be merely the early "First Fruits" of God's harvest, to help teach the majority of humanity raised by the second resurrection.
- The strict observance of the Ten Commandments is a required response of Christians to receiving the unearned gift of salvation from God. The Ten Commandments are an eternal and inexorable law, set in motion by God, which brings about every good effect when obeyed, but exacts pain, suffering, and eventually death (especially an ultimate spiritual death) when violated.
- Christians are required to observe the Holy Days of the Old Testament. These holidays symbolically teach the seven steps of God's master plan of salvation for humanity.
- A system of tithing in which 10% of one's total increase was donated to the church for its operation and for sharing the gospel with the world ("first tithe"); a second 10% was to be saved for the Christian family's expenses during the Holy Days ("second tithe"); and during the third and sixth year of each seven-year cycle, a third 10% was to be used for the indigent, widows, and orphans within the church ("third tithe"). Besides first, second, and third tithes, there was a "tithe of a tithe", 10% of one's second tithe, for maintenance of festival sites. Free will offerings were expected as well. On top of that there were the building fund, the Summer Educational Program (SEP), and the YOU youth program, all financed by church members. The ministry did not pay tithes; they received tithes as Levites, and lived on a higher income than most members.
- Abstinence from eating unclean meats listed in the Old Testament, such as pork and shellfish.
- God's children are not actually "born again" into spirit until after the return of Jesus to the Earth.
- The "sleep" state of the dead, meaning the dead have not yet been judged, rewarded, or condemned, but rather wait to be resurrected.
- Punishment of the incorrigible is not an eternity of torment in Hell, but rather a merciful annihilation, through fire, by the edict of God.
- Humans are completely mortal (i.e., no one possesses an immortal soul, because all are living mortal souls). Salvation is the free, unearned gift of eternal life in God's family as children of God, given upon the prerequisite of faith in God and repentance from sin. This results in a motivation to completely observe God's "eternal laws" (i.e., Old Covenant laws).
- Three resurrections of the dead—first, faithful believers as the First Fruit harvest at Jesus' Second Coming; second, non-believers temporarily resurrected to mortality for an opportunity to learn and accept God's way; and third, resurrection of the incorrigibly wicked for final judgment. This final group will consist of those whose minds had been fully opened to God's truth, either in this age or after the second resurrection, and rejected it; mainly, those truly called but who fell away, and those who incorrigibly rebel in the "Wonderful World Tomorrow".

== Opinions ==
Walter Martin's book, The Kingdom of the Cults (1965) argues that Armstrong's teachings are largely a conglomerate of teachings from other groups, noting similarities in elements of his teachings to the Seventh-day Adventists (sabbatarianism, annihilationism, and their belief that the soul remains asleep until its bodily resurrection), Jehovah's Witnesses (whose belief differs from the mainstream Christian belief that the soul stays awake and goes to either Heaven or Hell immediately following death), and Mormonism (God Family doctrine).

== Churches of God ==
There are many splinter churches as well as second-generation splinters from WCG since Armstrong's death. Most of these churches hold fast to Armstrong's teachings and primarily pattern their organizations on how WCG operated. They are often referred to collectively as the "Sabbatarian Churches of God" or simply as the "Churches of God" or "the COG".

=== Notable churches ===
- Church of God International (United States) (COGI) – the church founded by Garner Ted Armstrong in 1978 following his departure from WCG
- House of Yahweh (HOY) – a religious sect in Texas founded in 1980 by former WCG member Yisrayl Hawkins, who preaches a message based on some of Armstrong's core beliefs
- Philadelphia Church of God (PCG) – founded in 1989 by former WCG pastor Gerald Flurry following gradual doctrinal changes in WCG
- Church of the Great God (CGG) – founded in 1992 by John Ritenbaugh after WCG's doctrinal changes
- Global Church of God (GCG) – the church founded by Roderick C. Meredith in 1992 following a series of doctrinal changes in WCG
- United Church of God (UCG) – the largest splinter from WCG founded in 1995
- The Intercontinental Church of God (ICOG) – formed by Garner Ted Armstrong in 1998 following his resignation from CGI.
- Living Church of God (LCG) – founded by Meredith in 1998 following his removal from GCG
- Restored Church of God (RCG) – founded in May 1999 by David C. Pack after his firing from GCG
- Church of God Preparing for the Kingdom of God (COG-PKG) – founded by Ronald Weinland in 2006 following his departure from UCG; Weinland was convicted of tax evasion in 2012
- Church of God, a Worldwide Association (COGWA) – a church that split from UCG in 2010 under UCG's fourth president, Clyde Kilough

=== Notable publications ===
- The Plain Truth – WCG's flagship magazine, originally written and produced by Armstrong's Radio Church of God; publication continues to this day.
- The Good News – a WCG-produced Christian living magazine. The name was taken up by the United Church of God after the 1995 schism until 2016.
- Beyond Today – United Church of God's bi-monthly magazine since January 2016, formerly The Good News.
- 1975 in Prophecy! – Armstrong's book describing an uncertain timeline for the book of Revelation impending apocalypse. Illustrated by Basil Wolverton.
- The Philadelphia Trumpet – Philadelphia Church of God's monthly magazine
- The Pillar – Restored Church of God's bi-monthly magazine for members.

=== Television and the internet ===
- The World Tomorrow – The original radio and television broadcast at first anchored by Herbert W. Armstrong and later by his son Garner Ted Armstrong. The show is still being produced by Church of God, Worldwide Ministries.
- The World To Come – Restored Church of God's weekly video and daily audio programs preaching the church's doctrines.
- The Key of David – Philadelphia Church of God's television broadcast
- Beyond Today – United Church of God's television broadcast
- Tomorrow's World – Living Church of God's television broadcast

=== Notable people ===
Many people are publicly associated with Armstrongism and the legacy of WCG.

- Herbert W. Armstrong – Founder of the Radio Church of God, which later became the Worldwide Church of God. His teachings are the basis for Armstrongism today.
- Garner Ted Armstrong – Herbert W. Armstrong's son and a long-time WCG evangelist; he later had a falling-out with his father who excommunicated him
- Jules Dervaes – a proponent of the urban homesteading movement and former member of WCG still adherent to Armstrong's teachings
- Bobby Fischer – the chess grandmaster was a member of WCG from the mid-1960s until 1977
- Roderick C. Meredith – a chief evangelist in WCG who later founded the Global Church of God before starting the Living Church of God
- Stanley Rader – Armstrong's lawyer and close confidant during WCG's glory years
- Terry Ratzmann – an American mass murderer who shot seven fellow Living Church of God members in Wisconsin in 2005 before taking his own life
- Denis Michael Rohan – an Australian member of WCG who famously attempted to set fire to the Jami'a Al-Aqsa in 1969 under the belief it would accelerate the coming apocalypse
- Joseph W. Tkach – Armstrong's successor who was ultimately responsible for WCG's doctrinal reformation and shift away from Armstrongist teachings
- Joseph Tkach Jr. – Tkach's son and successor who eventually finished WCG's transition to mainstream Christian orthodoxy
- Ronald Weinland – leader of the Church of God Preparing for the Kingdom of God
- Basil Wolverton – a Mad Magazine artist noted for illustrations in Herbert W. Armstrong's book 1975 in Prophecy! about the impending apocalypse
