= Binitarianism =

Theology of two-person Godhead

Binitarianism is a theology of two persons, personas, or aspects in one substance/Divinity (or God). Classically, binitarianism is understood as a form of monotheism—that is, that God is absolutely one being—and yet with binitarianism there is a "twoness" in God, which means one God family. (In contrast to ditheism/duotheism) The other common forms of monotheism are "unitarianism", a belief in one God with one person, and "trinitarianism", a belief in one God with three persons. Binitarianism differs from Trinitarianism only through its affirmation that the holy Spirit is the Spirit of God, the Father and the Son, rather than a distinct person apart from the Father and the Son.

== In Second Temple Judaism ==
Scholar Alan F. Segal argues that many Jews prior to Jesus's time held to a binitarian theology of the "Two Powers in Heaven", he writes:

Though it was difficult to date the rabbinic traditions accurately in many cases, the results showed that the earliest heretics believed in two complementary powers in heaven while only later could heretics be shown to believe in two opposing powers in heaven. The extra-rabbinic evidence allowed the conclusion that the traditions were earlier than the first century. Furthermore, in comparing the literature, it was possible to define a number of dangerous scriptural interpretations central to the heresy and show how the rabbis countered them by bringing in other scriptures which unambiguously stated God’s unity. From this evidence it became clear that the basic heresy involved interpreting scripture to say that a principal angelic or hypostatic manifestation in heaven was equivalent to God.

Alan goes further, saying that this view was not considered heretical until as late as the second century. Daniel Boyarin writes concerning the Logos in the writings of Philo of Alexandria:

It becomes apparent, therefore, that for one branch of pre-Christian Judaism, at least, there was nothing strange about a doctrine of a deuteros theos, and nothing in that doctrine that precluded monotheism.

== Scholarly views of early Christian theology ==
Larry W. Hurtado of University of Edinburgh uses the word "binitarian" to describe the position of early Christian devotion to God, which ascribes to the Son (Jesus) an exaltedness that in Judaism would be reserved for God alone, while still affirming as in Judaism that God is one and is alone to be worshiped. He writes:

...there are a fairly consistent linkage and subordination of Jesus to God 'the Father' in these circles, evident even in the Christian texts from the latter decades of the 1st century that are commonly regarded as a very 'high' Christology, such as the Gospel of John and Revelation. This is why I referred to this Jesus-devotion as a 'binitarian' form of monotheism: there are two distinguishable figures (God and Jesus), but they are posited in a relation to each other that seems intended to avoid the ditheism of two gods.

Hurtado does not describe binitarianism as antithetical to Nicene Christianity but rather as an indication that Christians before the First Council of Nicaea were monotheistic (as evidenced by their singular reference to the Father as God), yet also devoted to Jesus as pre-existent, co-eternal, the creator, embodying the power of God, by whom the Father is revealed, and in whose name alone the Father is worshiped. He writes, "The central place given to Jesus ... and ... their concern to avoid ditheism by reverencing Jesus rather consistently with reference to 'the Father', combine to shape the proto-orthodox 'binitarian' pattern of devotion. Jesus truly is reverenced as divine."

Hurtado's view might be interpreted as urging that, at this stage in the development of the Church's understanding, it could be said that God is a person (the Father) and one being; and that Jesus is distinct from the Father, was pre-existent with God, and also originating from God without becoming a being separate from him, so that he is God (the Son). This view of a binitarian pattern of devotion would posit a unity of God's being and a oneness of the object of worship, which is sympathetic to its predecessor view in Judaism; and it also displays a plurality of simultaneous identities, which is sympathetic to its successor in trinitarianism. It is a development in understanding of Christ, in other words, from which arose several subsequent ones in the further course of development that eventually came into conflict with one another.

Before Hurtado's influential work, one classic scholarly theory of binitarianism was that the Holy Spirit was seen as in some sense identical to the Son or uniquely embodied in him. The Shepherd of Hermas, among other sources, is cited to support the theory. Near the end of Parable Five, for example, an angel declares:

The preexistent Holy Spirit, which created the whole creation, God caused to live in the flesh that he wished. This flesh, therefore, in which the Holy Spirit lived served the Spirit well, living in holiness and purity, without defiling the Spirit in any way. ... [I]t had lived honorably and chastely, and had worked with the Spirit and cooperated with it in everything.

The classic theory of Christian binitarian theology (assumed by most dictionary definitions) asserts that some early Christians conceived of the Spirit as going out from God the creator, and is the creator: a person of God's being, which also lived in Jesus (or, from other sources, appears to be thought of as Jesus's pre-existent, divine nature). This view further asserts that the same Spirit is given to men, making them a new creation and sharers in the same hope of resurrection and exaltation. This interpretation of early Christian belief is often cited in contrast to trinitarianism. However, trinitarians cite the same sources as examples of pre-Nicene Christian monotheism, which is not orthodoxy but "proto-orthodox"—that is, one of several versions among Christians which explain monotheism as a plurality (Father, Son, Spirit) in one being, prior to orthodoxy's settlement in Christianity.

By the time of the Arian controversy, some bishops defended a kind of "dual" conception of deity, which is sometimes called "Semi-Arian". Macedonianism (the Pneumatomachi) typifies this view, which some prefer to call "binitarian" as at that time the Semi-Arians were the main binitarians. None of the Semi-Arian views were strictly monotheistic (one being). All asserted that the God who speaks and the Word who creates are two beings similar to one another, of similar substance (homoiousia [ὁμοιούσία]), and denied that they are one and the same being, or two persons of the same substance (homoousia [ὁμοούσία]) in which two are distinguished, as Nicaea eventually held.

== History ==
Larry Hurtado argued that "earliest Christian worship specifies two figures, God and Jesus, as recipients", and Alan F. Segal stated that early rabbis regarded early Christianity as binitarian. Young Richard Kim states that Justin's texts were binitarian, and that the same applies to the texts of Tertullian and Eusebius of Caesarea.

The first defense of the doctrine of the Trinity was made by Tertullian, who defined the Trinity as Father, Son, and Holy Spirit and defended his theology against Praxeas, although he noted that the majority of believers in his day took issue with his doctrine. Kim writes that Tertullian's confession, although it implies a Trinity, is binitarian in structure.

In the mid-4th century, orthodox apologist Epiphanius of Salamis wrote, "Semi-Arians ... hold the truly orthodox view of the Son, that he was forever with the Father ... but has been begotten without beginning and not in time ... But all of these blaspheme the Holy Spirit, and do not count him in the Godhead with the Father and the Son."

After the First Council of Nicaea condemned Arianism, the Council of Constantinople was called in 381 to address groups described here as binitarians and referred to as "Semi-Arians". As the Trinity was finalized at that time as official Christian doctrine, the Semi-Arians walked out. "They rejected the Arian view that Christ was created and had a different nature from God (anomoios [ἀνόμοιος]—dissimilar), but neither did they accept the Nicene Creed, which stated that Christ was 'of one substance' (homoousios [ὁμοούσιος]) with the Father. Semi-Arians taught that Christ was similar (homoios [ὅμοιος]) to the Father, or of like substance (homoiousios [ὁμοιούσίος]), but still subordinate."

After Ellen G. White gained influence in the American Adventist movement, the binitarian Church of God (Seventh Day) was founded in 1858 in the Midwestern United States states of Michigan and Iowa after splitting from Adventists who in 1863 founded the Seventh-day Adventist Church. Later, in 1897, White published a pamphlet declaring the Holy Spirit "the third person of the Godhead". Andrews University, an Adventist institution of higher learning, states that Seventh-day Adventists had earlier been inclined toward binitarianism, which Gerhard Pfandl terms "Semi-Arian". With many Church of God binitarians believe their Christology perspective most accurately reflects that of the "original" Jewish Christians.

== Church of God ==
By the latter half of the 19th century, binitarianism was held by a relatively small group of church denominations. At present, it is a theology essentially held only by some 7th Day Church of God groups. The largest denominations that appear to hold a binitarian view today are:

- The General Conference of the Church of God (Seventh Day) – other Church of God (7th Day) groups remain unitarian
- Spin-off groups from the former Worldwide Church of God, founded by Herbert W. Armstrong, most notably:
  - The United Church of God
  - The Living Church of God

The sabbatarian churches of God persist in their worship of Jesus and the Father; insisting that, in their worship of the "plural" God, "Elohim" (Gods), as multiple, separate, and individual God-beings of which only the Father and Son are now very God, they are practicing monotheism in the sense that "Elohim" is one family unit. Adherents of these churches believe they will eventually be born into that family as children of God at a resurrection of the dead at the Second Coming of Christ. They also believe that others will follow as children of God after Christ rules on Earth and teaches the correct way to live and follow him. These same groups insist certain human beings may eventually be gifted with all the attributes of the Father and Jesus. These humans who may enter the "God family" are currently only those found to be attending the congregations that openly support "pluralism", but after Jesus's return salvation shall be offered to all during the Great White Throne Judgment, which is a form of universal reconciliation. God's plural identification in Genesis as "Elohim", as the Father and the Word or Logos (John 1:1–18) who became the Son of God, the firstborn of many brethren, leaves room for untold numbers to be added to God's family. This binitarian view posits that humanity eventually will have access to become members of God's family in their own right each with the power of the Holy Spirit, however, not equal to Father or Son. As part of the binitarian view it is also believed that, as the Bible states, the Father is greater than Jesus.

== Contrast with Trinitarians ==
Semi-Arian binitarians do not believe that Jesus "was truly human and truly God", which is the position held by trinitarians. They believe that Jesus was God (the Word) prior to His Incarnation, that He became fully human (finite) yet he was not fully God during the pre-resurrection incarnation as He did not have the powers etc. of God then, and that all authority was restored to Him (as well as his infinite God-status) at or shortly after the resurrection. They make three major claims to support that position:

1. Semi-Arian binitarians believe that Jesus emptied Himself of His Divinity while in the flesh, citing the same Scriptures which trinitarians cite to the opposite conclusion: that he denied himself the honor and glory he deserved, and hid the fact that he is equal to the Father, in order to serve those who were undeserving. 2 Corinthians 8:9 states that Jesus became poor, yet God is rich (Haggai 2:8), while Philippians 2:7 states, "... Christ Jesus, who subsisting in (the) form of God thought (it) not robbery to be equal to God, but emptied Himself, taking (the) form of a slave, becoming in (the) likeness of men". The Semi-Arian view of these texts is called kenosis, referring to the idea that what Jesus "emptied" himself of was his divinity (rather, than, say, his exalted position in Heaven).
2. They deny the trinitarian teaching that Jesus possessed two wills and two natures. For this reason, they view the assertions of Jesus that He "could do nothing" without the Father, prior to His resurrection (John 5:19, 30; 8:28), as a denial by him that he had all divine rights until after the resurrection, when he claimed that he had "all authority in heaven and on earth" (Matthew 28:18). They conclude that it is because he had overcome the temptations of Satan and upon living the perfect, sinless life would be "all powerful".
3. Similarly, they note that the Bible claims that Jesus was tempted in all points as humans are (Hebrews 4:15) and that in another place the Bible claims "God cannot be tempted by evil" (James 1:13). Denying the trinitarian view of two natures, Semi-Arian binitarians see the assertions as contradictory if posited of the same person and therefore, since "scripture cannot be broken" (John 10:35), Jesus could not have been fully God while in the flesh. But still that is contrary to Colossians 2:9 which says, "For in him dwelleth all the fullness of the Godhead bodily," and Luke 4:12 "And Jesus answered, and said unto him, It is said, Thou shalt not tempt the Lord thy God."

In other words, Semi-Arian binitarians believe that in the flesh Jesus was not who He was prior to His Incarnation (God the Word), not what He was (i.e. not fully God with all authority) since His resurrection. He was God, then he was not fully God, then he was God again.

Trinitarianism views the Holy Spirit as another person like the Son, who comes from God without becoming a separate being from him (Matthew 28:19–20; John 16:5–7; Acts 1:8, 2:4). Binitarianism teaches that the Holy Spirit is the personal, intimate, essential Spirit and power, activity, and presence of God (Psalm 51:11, Luke 1:35, Luke 11:20/Matthew 12:28), with no distinct identity within God, and not a separate person as they conceive the Son to be (Matthew 11:27, 1 John 1:3). For example, in its Official Statement of Fundamental Beliefs, the binitarian Living Church of God states, "The Holy Spirit is the very essence, the mind, life and power of God. It is not a Being. The Spirit is inherent in the Father and the Son, and emanates from Them throughout the entire universe (1 Kings 8:27; Psalm 139:7; Jeremiah 23:24). It was through the Spirit that God created all things (Genesis 1:1–2; Revelation 4:11). It is the power by which Christ maintains the universe (Hebrews 1:2–3). It is given to all who repent of their sins and are baptized (Acts 2:38–39) and is the power (Acts 1:8; 2 Timothy 1:6–7) by which all believers may be 'overcomers' (Romans 8:37 (KJV); Revelation 2:26–27) and will be led to eternal life."

Scripture mentions prayer to the Father, and to the Son, but the Holy Spirit is never prayed to nor worshiped in the Bible; in Revelation, there is praise to the "One who sits upon the throne" (God), "and to the Lamb" (Jesus), but the Spirit is not mentioned; modern binitarians conclude that this is because the Holy Spirit is not a distinct person, but the personal Spirit (mind, character, power, and active presence) of God the Father and the Son.

Binitarians believe that statements from early Christian leaders such as Melito of Sardis and Polycarp of Smyrna were binitarian, though most mainstream scholars do not accept this assertion. Binitarians point out, for example, while both call the Father and Son "God" not only do neither refer to the Holy Spirit as God, Melito's Oration on Our Lord’s Passion suggests that the Holy Spirit is simply the power of God in action. Binitarians have noted that Paul honors the Father and the Son towards the beginning of every book he wrote, but never does so for the Holy Spirit. Trinitarians see Romans 1:4 "And declared to be the Son of God with power, according to the spirit of holiness, by the resurrection from the dead:", Ephesians 1:13 "In whom ye also trusted, after that ye heard the word of truth, the gospel of your salvation: in whom also after that ye believed, ye were sealed with that Holy Spirit of promise", 1 Thessalonians 1:5–6 "For our gospel came not unto you in word only, but also in power, and in the Holy Ghost (cor. gk. pneuma, air, breath, breeze, Spirit), and in much assurance; as ye know what manner of men we were among you for your sake. And ye became followers of us, and of the Lord, having received the word in much affliction, with joy of the Holy Ghost (cor. Spirit):" and 1 Timothy 1:14 "And the grace of our Lord was exceeding abundant with faith and love which is in Christ Jesus." as exceptions.

By not considering that the Holy Spirit is a person of God, or God's mind, some binitarians were also called the Pneumatomachi, as a subset of Semi-Arians.

=== Roman Catholicism and Eastern Orthodoxy ===
Binitarians from groups originating in the Early Church believe that the teaching from Romans 8:29 about Jesus being "the firstborn among many brethren" demonstrates that Christians will be in the Family called "God". The view that God is a Family that Christians can expect to be born into is not widely held within groups that profess Christianity. By contrast, Trinitarians believe that by being united with Christ, Christians become participants in the Son's communion with the Father; they become sons by adoption and brothers to Christ, and "sharers in the divine nature" (although Eastern Orthodox Christians qualify this participation as being in God's communicable energies, not his transcendent essence). This contrasting, majority view has been thoroughly developed in the Catholic, Trinitarian tradition inherited by most Protestants.

For example, the Trinitarian Eastern Orthodox Church teaches that Christians will by grace become so entirely conformed to the will, purpose, and character of God, that they will be gods by the grace of God, but not on the same level of the Uncreated God. Timothy Ware, an Eastern Orthodox theologian, wrote: "St. Athanasius summed up the purpose of the Incarnation by saying, 'God became human that we might be made God'...we are God's 'offspring' (or generation) (Acts xvii, 28), His kin ... we will become 'like' God, we will acquire divine likeness; In the words of John Damascene ... To acquire the likeness is to be deified, it is to become a 'second god', a god by grace'. 'I said, ye are gods, and all of ye children of the Most High' (Psalm lxxxi, 6; cf John x, 34–35) ... Such, according to the teaching of the Orthodox Church, is the final goal at which every Christian must attain: to become like God, to obtain theosis, 'deification' or 'divinization'. For Orthodoxy, human salvation and redemption mean something close to, but not the same as, deification...deification is not something reserved for a select few initiates, but is something intended for all alike, but only in the sense of attainment of heavenly attributes. The Orthodox Church believes this is the normal goal of every Christian without exception. Certainly we shall only be deified on the Last Day; but for each of us the process of divinization must begin here and now in this present life." Western Christians generally avoid the terminology of deification, divinization, or theosis, while not necessarily rejecting analogous concepts of sanctification or glorification, which are often expressed with different theological emphases.

Modern binitarians strongly agree with these Eastern Orthodox statements concerning deification, as they understand them. However, in Eastern Orthodoxy, theosis is profoundly linked to a Trinitarian understanding of God, laying special emphasis on the Holy Spirit as containing and communicating the fullness of God. In Eastern Orthodox theology, to deny that the Holy Spirit eternally proceeds from the Father alone and to instead assert procession from both the Father and the Son, as the filioque states, is seen as compromising the Monarchy of the Father and risking a subordination of the Holy Spirit. The Roman Church accepted and urged adoption of the filioque, which formed a key theological rationale for the Great Schism with the Eastern Orthodox in 1054. The Orthodox urge that filioque statements must be rejected because the theological understanding of the Spirit is directly attached to consequent notions of what the unity of God is and what salvation means. In addition, the Orthodox view of theosis only allows humans to be united with God in his "energies" (his communicable, uncreated operations), but never with God's "essence" (his unknowable, transcendent being).

Some binitarians look forward to their hope of being deified and deny that the trinitarian or Chalcedonian doctrines uniquely assert anything necessary to a godly faith. Nevertheless, as they do not see the strict monotheism or the trinitarianism of Eastern Orthodoxy as contributing anything essential, these binitarians see themselves as closer to the Eastern Orthodox view than to the concepts of sanctification or divinization found in Western (Augustinian) Christianity, or the Mormon views of deification, as they understand these doctrines.

The Oriental Orthodox position is the same as the Eastern Orthodox position; however, they do not accept the wording of the Chalcedonian Creed.

== See also ==
- Armstrongism
- Conceptions of God
- First Council of Constantinople (381)
- Lectures on Faith, an early Mormon work on a two-person Godhead
- Names of God
- Nontrinitarianism
- Pneumatomachi
- Trinity
- Restored Church of Jesus Christ
