= Rachel Oakes Preston =

American writer

Rachel (Harris) Oakes Preston
- Born: March 2, 1809; Vernon, VT
- Died: February 1, 1868 (aged 58)
- Occupation: Author
- Known for: Being the Seventh Day Baptist who introduced Sabbatarianism to the Adventist movement.
- Spouse(s): Amory Oakes (widowed), Nathan T. Preston

Rachel Oakes Preston (née Harris; March 2, 1809 – February 1, 1868) was an American Seventh Day Baptist who persuaded a group of Adventist Millerites to accept Saturday, instead of Sunday, as Sabbath. This Sabbatarian group organised as the Seventh-day Adventist Church in 1863.

== Life ==
Born in Vernon, Vermont, Rachel, daughter of Sylvanus Harris, first joined the Methodist Church. After marrying Amory Oakes, Rachel moved to Verona, New York, where her husband soon died. In 1837 Rachel and her daughter, Rachel Delight Oakes, joined the Seventh Day Baptist Church of Verona. In 1843 the widowed Rachel and her daughter moved to Washington, New Hampshire, where her daughter would teach school. While attending the "Christian Brethren" church with her daughter, Rachel tried to present her views on seventh-day Sabbath. However, the congregation, being Millerites, were focused in preparing for the Second Coming of Christ, which they earnestly thought would occur in 1843 or 1844.

Due to Rachel's influence, Frederick Wheeler (1811–1910), an ordained minister of the Methodist Episcopal Church, and promoter of the prophetic teachings of William Miller, preached his first sermon on seventh-day Sabbath to his "Christian Brethren" congregation on March 16, 1844.

Further due to Rachel's influence, William Farnsworth (1807–1888), after the Great Disappointment of October 22, 1844, stated publicly to the "Christian Brethren" congregation his conviction that Saturday, being the seventh day of the week, was Sabbath. His brother Cyrus (who became the husband of Rachel's daughter Delight), and several others, also made their convictions known.

Later, when Rachel married Nathan T. Preston, she was referred to as Rachel Oakes Preston.

== See also ==
- History of the Seventh-day Adventist Church
