= Church of God Preparing for the Kingdom of God =

Apocalypticist splinter sect of the Worldwide Church of God

The Church of God, Preparing for the Kingdom of God (COG-PKG) is an apocalypticist splinter sect of the Worldwide Church of God (WCG) that claims to provide "support, education and warning" to former members of the WCG. It is one of many groups that left the WCG after its sweeping doctrinal changes in the late 1980s, and forms a part of the seventh-day Sabbatarian Churches of God, following the teachings of the WCG's founder, Herbert W. Armstrong. Headquartered in Cincinnati, Ohio, the COG-PKG is an international church which is mostly active on the Internet. It was founded in 1998 by Ronald Weinland, a former WCG minister.

== Founder ==
The COG-PKG is led by its founder Ronald Weinland (born May 30, 1949), a Colorado-born minister who served in the WCG from 1981 to 1995. When the church made major doctrinal changes after Herbert Armstrong's death in 1986, Weinland moved to the United Church of God (UCG). He served the UCG's Toledo, Ohio, congregation until 1997, when he departed after issuing an open letter to the church criticizing its management. In 1998, Weinland started publishing a newsletter called "News Watch", which ran for about four years and helped establish the prophetic themes of his later ministry. He founded the COG-PKG in 1998. On August 4, 2005, Weinland suffered from a heart attack after which he proclaimed himself as a prophet and an apostle of God. Weinland's deteriorating health led him to suffer a second heart attack during his prison sentence on May 28, 2015.

=== Tax evasion trial and imprisonment ===
On November 10, 2011, Weinland was indicted by a federal grand jury on five charges of tax evasion. It was alleged that he had understated his income on federal tax returns, redirected COG-PKG church funds for personal use and concealed the existence of a Swiss bank account.

Weinland admitted that church funds were placed in a bank account in Switzerland and that his was one of the two names on the account, but denied that there was any tax evasion, and stated that all funds had since been repatriated to the United States and used for church advertising. Weinland informed his church before opening the account, in a December 2002 sermon entitled "Planning Ahead".

Weinland's trial began on June 4, 2012. On June 13, after less than four hours of deliberation, a jury found Weinland guilty on all counts of tax evasion. He remained under house detention and electronic surveillance until his sentencing hearing. On November 14, 2012, Weinland was sentenced to 42 months' imprisonment and a $245,000 tax restitution; his prison term ended in 2016.

== Church history ==
=== Development ===
Weinland founded the COG-PKG in 1998, drawing followers from UCG's Toledo congregation and ex-WCG members in Georgia and Texas. Prior to his imprisonment, Weinland delivered his sermons weekly on Saturday afternoons to church members throughout the United States and Canada via live streaming audio on the Internet. The COG-PKG also has a number of members overseas who listen to recordings of the sermons. The church's headquarters are located in Cincinnati, Ohio. In a 2009 sermon, Weinland warned that critics who mocked him or the COG-PKG would be divinely cursed with "a sickness that will eat them from the inside out".

=== Predictions ===
Under Weinland's tutelage, the COG-PKG has adopted an apocalyptic belief in the imminent end of the existing world order. Weinland has repeatedly predicted the swift return of Jesus Christ, whom he believes will set up the Kingdom of God upon the Earth. This view was expressed in Weinland's books, The Prophesied End-Time and 2008 – God's Final Witness. In 2006, Weinland identified himself to be "the spokesman of [God's] two end-time witnesses", who are mentioned in the Book of Revelation. In an April 2008 sermon, he identified his wife, Laura, as the other witness of Revelation, and called Pope Benedict XVI a "false prophet". Weinland furthermore claimed that he was "an end-time apostle to the world" and "the end-time Elijah to come", as mentioned in Malachi 4:5-6.

==== 2012–2013 prophecies ====
In 2008, Weinland wrote that "the final countdown has begun, as the 1,335 days before the actual day Jesus Christ returns began on Tuesday, September 30, 2008." Weinland later changed his prophesied date for the return of Christ to Pentecost of 2012, which fell on May 27. Prior to this date, Weinland declared that 7,000 ministers and leading members of the Sabbatarian Churches of God would die in the Great Tribulation.

May 27, 2012, passed without Weinland's predicted apocalypse. In a blog posting dated May 26, 2012, Weinland acknowledged that "nothing has begun in the world that would signal the need or purpose for ... Christ's return". He urged his followers to "move forward", and suggested that God had been, and continued to be, merciful to his people. He later stated that the end of the world had indeed begun on May 27, 2012, but would take "one year to become fulfilled". Weinland next asserted that Christ would return on May 19, 2013 (Pentecost Sunday), but later withdrew this prediction. In a blog post dated May 13, 2013, Weinland stated that Christ would return on some future Pentecost Sunday, but only when the Earth had endured "much suffering"; he did not give a specific year. He expressed hope that members would remain with the church after May 19, 2013, which passed without any apocalyptic event.

==== Predictions for 2019 and beyond ====
June 9, 2019 was the date prophesied by Weinland in his book Prophecy Against the Nations as the second coming of Jesus Christ, which would be preceded by several biblical events in conjunction with the start of World War III. During the time leading up to this date, Weinland began to express uncertainties in his prediction by issuing statements such as "not everything is going to pan out the way you thought" or "Is Christ About to Return?" on his website. On his church's website, Weinland continues to make predictions about end time events that range within the coming months and years.

== See also ==
- Armstrongism
- List of dates predicted for apocalyptic events
- Philadelphia Church of God, a similar apocalypticist splinter church
