= Church of God of the Original Mountain Assembly =

Holiness denomination founded in 1946

- Classification: Pentecostal
- Orientation: Holiness Pentecostal
- Origin: 1946; Kentucky

The Church of God of the Original Mountain Assembly is a small Holiness Pentecostal Christian body with roots in the late 19th-century Wesleyan-Holiness movement and early 20th-century Pentecostal revival. It shares its early history with the Church of God Mountain Assembly.

Representatives from churches which withdrew from the South Union Association of United Baptists met at the Jellico Creek church in Whitley County, Kentucky and formed a new association. They chose the name Church of God. "Of the Mountain Assembly" was added later to distinguish this group from many others denominated Church of God. Church of God of the Original Mountain Assembly divided from the parent body and organized as a separate church in 1946 at Williamsburg, Kentucky.

According to J. Gordon Melton's The Encyclopedia of American Religions, the Church of God of the Original Mountain Assembly had 11 congregations in 1967. The encyclopedia classified them as trinitarian holiness Pentecostals.
