= Restored Church of God =

Church formed in response to major doctrinal changes in the Worldwide Church of God

- Classification: Church of God
- Leader: David C. Pack
- Region: International
- Headquarters: Wadsworth, Ohio
- Founder: David C. Pack
- Origin: 1999
- Separated from: Worldwide Church of God, Global Church of God

The Restored Church of God (RCG) is one of many churches which were formed in response to major doctrinal changes which were made within the Worldwide Church of God (WCG) in 1995. The RCG claims to retain the tenets, style, and structure which existed in the earlier WCG before church leader Herbert W. Armstrong's death in 1986.

== Foundation ==
The RCG was formed in May 1999, in the midst of an ongoing upheaval in the wake of a departure from the WCG's established beliefs. It is based in Wadsworth, Ohio.

The RCG's founder and leader is David C. Pack (born 1948). As Pastor General of the Restored Church of God, Pack oversees the operations of the church. He attended Ambassador College and entered WCG's ministry in 1971. Following the 1995 schism in WCG, Pack became a minister in the Global Church of God, but he was fired on May 3, 1999, and established his own church. Since then, he has established over 50 congregations, authored more than 20 books, written hundreds of booklets and articles, and appeared on The History Channel.

The church claims to have thousands of members, but no reliable numbers have been published.

== Doctrines ==
The RCG asserts that its doctrines are very similar to those of its predecessor, and

"...it claims to be 'the only true extension of The Worldwide Church of God' as it was before Armstrong’s death."

adhering to what is often referred to as Armstrongism, which includes the belief in the impending Apocalypse followed by the millennial reign of Jesus Christ on Earth, along with Old Testament dietary laws, tithing, observance of seventh-day Sabbath, bans on holidays and festivals with pagan roots like Christmas and Easter, and most of Herbert W. Armstrong's other teachings. The church has been noted by Time for its strong stance against the Halloween tradition of Trick-or-treating.

== Church funding and the common doctrine ==
The Restored Church of God adheres to the laws of tithing as explained in the Old Testament. This has allowed a relatively small organization to reach people around the world. Non-members, called co-workers, freely give offerings to show their support of the work of the Restored Church of God. Another doctrine cited, called "Common" comes from the New Testament understanding that Christians should avoid excess and contribute out of their excess to support the work of the Church reaching millions around the world. This doctrine was first explained to the Church by Pack in 2011, in a four-part sermon series titled “Christ’s Sayings—One Great Theme.” It was then revisited in his early 2014 two-part series, “How a Small Church Does Such Big Things.” RCG members are told to "sell all" and give their excess to support the work of RCG.

== Publications ==
The RCG's flagship magazine is The Real Truth, of which Pack is editor-in-chief. Pack hosts the program The World to Come, and he has also written a two-volume Biography, and a booklet titled Here Is The Restored Church of God, which contains more descriptions of his church's doctrines and practices. The RCG's literature and programs are offered to the public free of charge.

- The World to Come: video and audio programs that preach the church's doctrines
- Hundreds of free books and booklets, articles, lessons, and magazines (also in Spanish, French, German, Dutch, Afrikaans, Italian, Polish, Swahili, Tahitian and Serbian)
- The Real Truth: a bi-monthly flagship magazine which analyzes world news in the light of Bible prophecy—is styled as a continuation of The Plain Truth magazine, as it was produced from 1934 through the mid-1980s
- Bible Introduction Course: 30 lessons which introduce the basic RCG doctrines
- The Splinter Explanation Packet: a series of ten books, as well as sermons, written for former WCG members
- The Pillar: a bi-monthly magazine which is published for the church's members
- Ambassador Youth: a bi-monthly magazine which is published for the church's teenagers

== Schools and camps ==
The RCG runs Ambassador Center, a two-year institution to train RCG's future ministers and leaders, modeled after the WCG's Ambassador College. The church also runs Ambassador Youth Camp, an annual summer camp for its teenage members.

The church discourages conventional two-person romantic dating among teenagers, preferring group-based social activities. It also discourages participation in blogs, especially among youth, citing concerns over victimization.

== Wadsworth headquarters ==
The RCG started constructing its world headquarters in Wadsworth, Ohio, and it was partially modeled after Armstrong's Ambassador College campus in Pasadena, California. The project broke ground on May 10, 2012, and the administration building officially opened on June 21, 2013.

== See also ==
- Christian observances of Jewish holidays
- Christian views on the Old Covenant
- Grace Communion International formerly the Worldwide Church of God
- Restorationism
