= Sabbath Rest Advent Church =

Christian church

- Official website: www.srac.de (Germany)

The Sabbath Rest Advent Church is a Christian church which has its spiritual roots in the Seventh-day Advent Church. It claims the inheritance of Seventh-day Adventist theologians Ellet J. Waggoner and Alonzo T. Jones. In Germany the church activities were first led by Wolfgang Meyer and later by Andreas Dura. The German branch is headquartered in Dickendorf and the Italian branch, called the Chiesa avventista del riposo sabatico in Italian, is located in Alessandria.

== History ==
The church accepts Wright's claim that church leaders are chosen by God and that they are responsible to him only, not to church members—Wright was deemed to be one such divine channel, but the church mentions Martin Luther as another. One characteristic of the belief is that God is looked to as the Master Healer. Some have accused the church that members are not allowed to visit a doctor. Andreas Dura, however, in a 2006 interview with the Siegener Zeitung, stated that church members are free to visit doctors. Dura also stated that the church is financed by way of tithes, and that church decisions must be taken in "harmony", even though the church sees itself as a theocracy.

== Church activities ==
In Germany, the headquarters houses a meeting room, a medical center with counseling and natural remedies, and rooms where the elderly and sick are cared for. A natural food store keeps a range of their own fresh and baked products as well as products from other suppliers.

The church has dealt specifically with the global problems of the energy crisis, climate change, the 2008 financial crisis, and inflation. These topics have been investigated and presented to the public in the forms of lectures, a children's musical, a panel discussion, and various projects and exhibitions. Not only has a view of the present and future crises been presented, but also the cause of these problems and possible solutions have been discussed.

Seminars are also held for members from various countries throughout the world where the participants learn to deal with practical, every day matters.

In New Zealand the church runs a community early childhood education centre (ECE) in rural Kimbolton, New Zealand which was licensed by the Education Review Office. Other activities included supplying the local area with a range of healthy dietary products and courses in health care.

The Idaho-branch in the USA has done several kinds of community work and organizes activities that combine fasting with physical activity; according to one church member, "We pretty much are a church group that is engaged in keeping all three—mind, body and soul—in tip-top shape." In the Czech Republic the church also offers health food products to local communities.

== The development of Bible truth ==
The Sabbath Rest Advent Church considers the whole Bible, the revealed word of God, as the foundation for its faith. In the history of the Sabbath Rest Advent Church, F. T. Wright (1923–1997) and Andreas Dura have been messengers.

== Main beliefs ==
Apart from its spiritual foundation in Protestantism, the following points form the heart of the church's doctrine: (See also An Introduction to the Sabbath Rest Advent Church.)

=== The character of God ===
The basis for a close and trusting relationship with God is a correct understanding of His loving character. God the Father, the Son, and the Holy Spirit (Trinity) are the three personages of the deity and they are One in character. There is no difference between the God of the Old Testament and the God of the New Testament. Jesus has shown that God is not a destroyer but a loving father who both gives and maintains life (see John 14:9; John 10:30), and that suffering and death are the unavoidable consequences of transgression of the moral and natural laws, but not the work of God.

=== Sabbath rest ===
The church teaches that a truly personal, trusting relationship with God can only be formed when God is seen as a loving father (see Matthew 6:9) as well as the Creator of this world; One who knows best what is for the good of each individual. This leads to an experience of deep and abiding peace—the Sabbath Rest of which the Bible speaks (see Hebrews 4:9).

The keeping of the Sabbath (the seventh day; see Genesis 2:2, 3; Exodus 20:8–11), as the divine day of rest, is seen to be a sign of this relationship as well as serving to deepen the believer's connection with God.

=== The rebirth ===
In the Bible, “sin” is described on the one hand as an action, namely as the transgression of the law (see 1 John 3:4). On the other hand, it is also declared to be a condition of slavery: “Whoever commits sin is a slave of sin.” John 8:34. This bondage is the real problem, because the actions are merely the results of this condition. God does not condemn the sinner but offers deliverance from sin. This is apparent in the way Jesus dealt with the adulteress. The Pharisees had already judged her guilty, but Jesus set her free with the words, “Neither do I condemn you; go and sin no more.” See John 8:1-11. The Sabbath Rest Advent Church understands that the deliverance that God offers is not merely the remission of guilt for actions committed, but also deliverance from the condition that repeatedly leads to transgression of the law. This is what Christ has made possible for every person through His death and resurrection (see Romans 6:5, 6).

This offer of deliverance is accepted by believing in what God has promised: a change of nature (see Ezekiel 36:26, 27)—a rebirth. As Jesus said: “Most assuredly, I say to you, unless one is born again, he cannot see the kingdom of God.” John 3:3.

By this deliverance from the ruling power of sin, the believer is enabled to follow Christ. In His life, Jesus has given a living example of what each born-again Christian can become in character.

=== The return of Christ ===
The conviction of the church members that Jesus will return a second time is based on the words of the angels to the disciples when Jesus ascended into heaven: “Men of Galilee, why do you stand gazing up into heaven? This same Jesus, who was taken up from you into heaven, will so come in like manner as you saw Him go into heaven.” Acts 1:11. The Sabbath Rest Advent Church teaches that the future does not lie in man's ability to solve problems, but in salvation through faith in Jesus Christ. The consummation of this hope will be realized at the second advent of Christ.

The Sabbath Rest Advent Church believes that before Christ can come again certain conditions, laid down in the word of God, must first be met. The foremost condition is a revelation of the character that Jesus manifested when He lived on earth (see 2 Peter 3:11–13; 1 Thessalonians 3:11–13). Therefore, waiting for Christ's return is not a passive but an active task—Christ's followers will do the same works of love that he did when he first came to this earth two thousand years ago.

== See also ==
- Italian Union of Seventh-day Adventist Christian Churches
