= Beyond Today =

- Editor: Scott Ashley
- Categories: Christian magazines
- Frequency: Bi-monthly
- Circulation: 450,000
- Publisher: United Church of God
- First issue: November/December 1995
- Country: United States
- Language: English also French, German, Spanish and Italian
- Website: Beyond Today
- ISSN: 1086-9514

Beyond Today (formerly titled The Good News) is a free religious magazine published bimonthly by the United Church of God (UCG). Subscriptions and printing costs are covered by tithed donations from UCG's members and employees. Subject matter includes Christian living, Bible prophecy, warnings to the English-speaking world, social issues, defense of creationism against evolution, world news, and prophecy, as interpreted by UCG's fundamental beliefs. Articles are exclusively written by the church's ministry.

World News and Prophecy and the teen-focused magazine Compass Check (formerly Vertical Thought) are sister publications, and cover the same subjects for the most part, adhering very closely to the church's doctrines.

Beyond Today is descended from a magazine of the same name originally published by the Worldwide Church of God (WCG) from 1951 to 1986. UCG split from WCG in 1995 over doctrinal disagreements, and started publishing its own version of The Good News the same year.

The magazine is also offered on a weekly television and internet program, Beyond Today, hosted by UCG pastors Darris McNeely, Gary Petty, and Steve Myers. It follows the magazine's themes, discussing world events through the filter of the church's apocalyptic beliefs and gospel of "God's soon-coming kingdom."

Beyond Today is published in English, Spanish, German, French, and Italian.
