= The Philadelphia Trumpet =

Magazine published by the Philadelphia Church of God

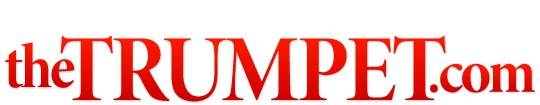
- Editor: Gerald Flurry
- Categories: Religious magazine
- Frequency: Ten times per year
- Circulation: 245,857 (November, 2020)
- Publisher: Philadelphia Church of God
- First issue: February 1990
- Country: United States
- Based in: Edmond, Oklahoma
- Website: www.thetrumpet.com
- ISSN: 1070-6348

The Philadelphia Trumpet is a magazine published by the Philadelphia Church of God (PCG), based in Edmond, Oklahoma. Launched in February 1990, it initially focused on the doctrines of Herbert W. Armstrong's "Plain Truth" magazine after Armstrong's death in 1986. The magazine primarily features articles about current events, societal commentary, and Bible-themed self-help topics, often interpreting Biblical writings as prophecies relating to world events.

Gerald Flurry, head of the PCG, serves as the magazine's editor-in-chief. The publication includes advertisements for other PCG materials.

== Mission statement ==
According to the PCG, the publication addresses matters of social, family, and environmental concern. The magazine covers topics such as current news, politics, philosophy, religion, and education, particularly as they relate to the quality of life.

== Financial structure ==
The Philadelphia Trumpet is distributed free of charge. It is financed by tithes and offerings from members of the Philadelphia Church of God and their "co-workers". PCG members are expected to contribute ten percent of their income to the church.

The Philadelphia Church of God is registered as a 501(c)(3) charity and is thus exempt from having to pay federal income tax. Contributions are kept confidential and are tax deductible under applicable federal and international law.

According to PCG, approximately "70 percent of all income for the Church’s operations comes from the tithes and offerings of members, while the balance comes from... non-member contributors", whom the PCG labels either "donors" or "co-workers".

The church defines a "donor" as a non-member who contributes less than twice in any six-month period, and whose annual contribution is less than $500, while a "co-worker" is a non-member who makes two or more contributions in any six-month period, or whose annual contribution exceeds $500

The PCG's peak revenue was $6.6 million in 2023.
