= Soldiers of the Cross Church =

Denomination organized in the early 1920s by Ernest William Sellers

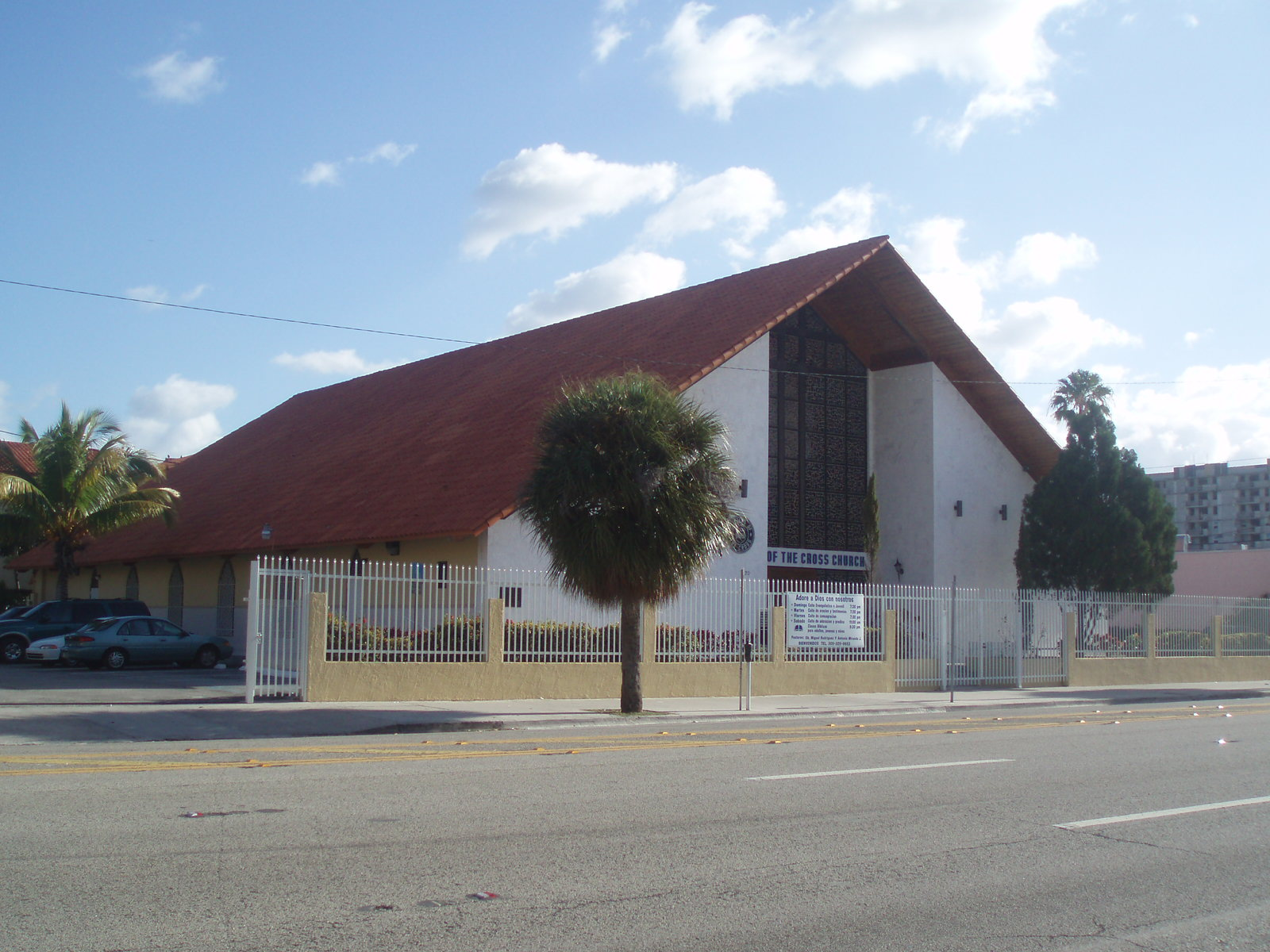
Soldiers of the Cross Church, Miami

The Evangelical International Church of the Soldiers of the Cross of Christ (originally Bando Evangélico Gedeón also known as the Soldiers of the Cross Church) is an Evangelist Christian denomination.

== Summary ==
It was organized in 1922 by an American businessman named Ernest William Sellers, who began holding evening religious services at his place of business in Havana, Cuba. After receiving a visit from a missionary named George Smith, Sellers was persuaded to organize a more active effort to evangelize Cuba with what he considered to be the proper understanding of the Bible. Sellers enthusiastically recruited and sent missionaries throughout the island of Cuba, and served as the church’s spiritual leader during the remainder of his life.

After Sellers' death, the church spread to other nations in Central and South America, and eventually relocated its headquarters to Miami, Florida, from where it currently operates. The church currently has missions in over 25 countries.

== History ==
Soldiers of the Cross of Christ Church (also known as Soldiers of the Cross, or Soldiers of the Cross of Christ International Church or IEISCC is a Christian denomination evangelical. It was founded by an American merchant named Ernest William Sellers, who established religious services at his place of business in Havana, Cuba around 1922. Sellers organized a Disciples Preparatory School (now a Theological Seminary) and sent missionaries throughout the island of Cuba. He served as a church leader for the rest of his life.

After Sellers' death in 1953, the ISCC managed to spread to other countries in Central, South America and Europe and finally established its international headquarters in the city of Miami, Florida, from where it directs operations in more than 15 countries.

== History ==
The original name of the church was Bando Evangélico Gedeón and had its first meeting center in Havana Street, in the city of Havana (Cuba), where it was organized between 1922 and 1925 by Ernest William Sellers, an American citizen who became better known in this Church as Apostle Daddy John. Daddy John.

Ernest Sellers carried out an intense missionary activity announcing the gospel of Jesus Christ in several countries, but his most fruitful work was carried out in Cuba, where in addition to making several evangelistic tours of the city, he preached on the radio and founded the magazine El Mensajero de los Postreros Días (the official organ of diffusion of the Church), whose first issue was published on September 15, 1939.

This Church was legally incorporated on March 25, 1930, and its main office was located at 1st Ave. and 36th St., Rpto. Miramar, Marianao, Prov. Havana, from where it was transferred to Baracoa Beach, municipality of Bauta, Prov. Havana, on July 13, 1942.

The Apostle Daddy John died in Baracoa Beach, on February 24, 1953, being 83 years old. Before his death he left in Cuba a church with hundreds of volunteer missionaries spreading his activities throughout the national territory, Mexico and Panama.

When Ernest Sellers died, he was succeeded in the leadership of the church by Bishop Ángel María Hernández Esperón, who at the time held the position of Ambassador of the Apostle Daddy John.

During the short administration of Apostle Ángel María the Church achieved a considerable development, since a great impulse was given to the establishment of new temples and missions, as well as to the improvement of the already existing ones throughout the country. Ángel María dedicated himself to the international extension of the Church, sending missionaries to found congregations in several countries of Central and South America and the Caribbean.

Upon the death of Apostle Ángel María Hernández, a Board, composed of Bishops Florentino Almeida Morales, Samuel Mendiondo García and José Rangel Sosa, assumed the provisional leadership of the Church. In a meeting held on December 31, 1961, the Board of Bishops announced that the new director of the Church would be Bishop Arturo Rangel Sosa, which was unanimously approved.

Arturo Rangel had been residing in Panama for more than 10 years as director of the church in that country, when he was informed of his appointment as general director. For this reason he moved to Cuba and took possession of his new position as Apostle-Director on February 22, 1962, being in charge of the circulation of El Mensajero de los Postreros Días, printing up to 250,000 copies per edition. Shortly after, due to the restrictions suffered by the press in Cuba, the printing of El Mensajero was transferred to the Republic of Panama, where it is still being edited.

In 1964 the Apostle added to the name of the Church the word "International," registering itself since then as "'Bando Evangélico Gedeón Internacional."

On August 17, 1966, the apostle Rangel left the Central Office, accompanied by his brother, Bishop José Rangel and the evangelist Heliodoro Castillo, on their way to the province of Matanzas and to date the whereabouts of these three missionaries is unknown.

Due to the disappearance of Apostle Arturo Rangel, Bishops Florentino Almeida and Samuel Mendiondo once again formed a board that assumed the direction of the Church on a provisional basis, a responsibility that took on a definitive character as the years went by, thus managing to keep the Church active and organized.

As the relations between the ruling regime in Cuba and the different religions became increasingly tense and in view of the growing difficulty in maintaining communication with the Church in other countries, the Board of Bishops decided to transfer the Central Office to the United States. Thus, on February 27, 1968, Bishop Samuel Mendiondo left Cuba, and on July 21, 1969, Bishop Florentino Almeida left, who established the Central Office in the city of Tampa, in the state of Florida, and later, in 1971, moved it to the nearby city of Miami, where it is currently located.

On May 14, 1971, at the international conference held in Tampa, Bishops Florentino Almeida and Samuel Mendiondo were promoted to the rank of Archbishop. That same year, by requirement of The Gideons International, a Christian organization formed by businessmen, the name of the church had to be changed from Gideon Evangelistic Band International to Gilgal Evangelistic Band International and later, in 1974, to 'Soldiers of the Cross of Christ Evangelical International Church ( in Spanish: Iglesia Evangélica Internacional Soldados de la Cruz de Cristo), the name under which it is officially incorporated in the various countries of America and Europe where it has been established.

== Structure ==
The Soldiers of the Cross are known by the distinctive white uniforms worn by their missionaries and ministers. From its beginning, this Church was organized in a hierarchical form by its founder Sellers. The members of the organization who dedicate their lives as missionaries wear on their uniforms an insignia that indicates their grade or rank within the hierarchy of the Church. The IEISCC is governed by a Superior Council presided over by the Apostle-Director. Bishop Miguel Rodríguez was elected to the position of Apostle-Director of the IEISCC on May 30, 2008.

== Beliefs and practices ==
The Soldiers of the Cross of Christ Church has many core beliefs in common with most evangelical Christian churches. They believe in the one true God, creator of heaven and earth, who eternally exists in three distinct persons: Father, Son and Holy Spirit. They believe the Bible to be the authoritative word of God, and in gifts of the Spirit and prophecy. However, there are many important areas of difference. For example, they observe the biblical seventh day Sabbath on Saturday and follow the commandment to not eat unclean foods

== See also ==
- Missionary Church of the Disciples of Jesus Christ
