= Living Church of God =

One of several groups that formed after the death of Herbert W. Armstrong

- Classification: Independent Christian
- Leader: Gerald E. Weston
- Region: International
- Headquarters: Charlotte, North Carolina
- Founder: Roderick C. Meredith
- Origin: 1998; San Diego, California
- Separated from: Global Church of God
- Congregations: 330

The Living Church of God (LCG) is one of several groups that formed after the death of Herbert W. Armstrong, when major doctrinal changes (causing turmoil and divisions) were occurring in the former Worldwide Church of God (WCG) during the 1990s. It was after its founder, the late Roderick C. Meredith, was fired by board members of the Global Church of God (GCG), that he went on to found, for a second time, a new organization in 1998. It is just one of many and varied Sabbatarian Churches of God groups that have sprung up from the former Worldwide Church of God, known today as Grace Communion International (GCI). The US membership of the LCG is claimed to be around 11,300 with about 5,000 of that total number being claimed international members. From the LCG organization, several additional split-off groups have resulted over the years, each one headed by a former LCG minister.

== Founder ==
The LCG's founder and Presiding Evangelist was, until his death, Roderick C. Meredith (June 21, 1930 – May 18, 2017).

Following Meredith's graduation from Ambassador College in Pasadena, California in June 1952, he was assigned by Herbert W. Armstrong (Pastor General of the Worldwide Church of God) to set up and pastor WCG congregations in Portland, Oregon; San Diego, California; and Seattle and Tacoma, Washington. On December 20, 1952, after summoning him back to the WCG's headquarters in Pasadena, California, from his pastorship in Oregon, Armstrong ordained him and four other men — including his uncle Dr. C. Paul Meredith — to the position of Evangelist. These men were the very first Evangelists of the WCG. Meredith was the youngest of the newly ordained men and the fifth to be ordained.

In the subsequent years, Meredith would help start scores of WCG congregations throughout the United States. He would also conduct many baptizing and evangelizing tours in the United States, the United Kingdom, Europe, and Africa. From the early to mid-1950s, and again in 1960, he was assigned by Armstrong to live in Britain to form congregations for the Church there. For years he was one of the WCG's leading theologians and top executives, and an instructor at Ambassador College. However, when overseeing the ministry during the 1960s, he began to gain a reputation for being too strict in his application of Church rules and regulations.

== LCG's Presiding Evangelist ==
Due to declining health, in 2016 (aged 86), Meredith appointed Evangelist Gerald E. Weston as his successor and as President of the LCG. Weston has served congregations throughout the United States, Canada, and Europe. He has been a frequent writer for the Church's publications, and has trained many ministers over the years. He has been a long time member of the Church's Council of Elders. Upon Meredith's death in May 2017, Weston became the LCG's Presiding Evangelist.

== Formation ==
After Armstrong died, the WCG began to change many of its core doctrines; a process that brought the organization into the mainstream of Evangelical Christianity. However, many members objected and hundreds of splinter groups arose as a result.

Meredith initially founded the Global Church of God (GCG) in December 1992, but due to disagreements in operation strategy the board fired Meredith from his positions as chairman of the board and Presiding Evangelist in 1998. He then formed the LCG, incorporating the church in San Diego, California, in December 1998. His dismissal was unpopular with GCG members, with as much as 80 percent of the GCG membership following Meredith to the newly formed LCG. In 2004, the late Evangelist Raymond F. McNair (ordained by Herbert W. Armstrong in 1953, a year after Meredith's ordination) left the LCG to start the Church of God 21st Century, which disbanded after his death in 2008. In 2005, ministers Don Haney and Ben Faulkner also left. Haney formed the Church of God In Peace and Truth, and Faulkner formed the Church of the Sovereign God. In 2006, Charles Bryce (whom Meredith had appointed head of Church administration) left and formed the Enduring Church of God. In late 2012, member Bob Thiel left and formed the Continuing Church of God. In 2013, minister Rod Reynolds left and formed the COG Messenger. In September 2020, minister Sheldon Monson formed the Church of God Assembly after he resigned.

In 2003, the church's corporate headquarters were moved from San Diego to Charlotte, North Carolina. The church reported in 2011 that it had 330 congregations in 45 countries, and that over 8,000 members attended its annual eight-day festival of the Feast of Tabernacles and Last Great Day, at 46 sites in 31 countries on every continent (except Antarctica). An independent auditor specializing in non-profits reported that the church's income for 2010 was over US$14.3 million. The LCG's revenue comes from tithes, holy day offerings, and other contributions from both members and non-members. The tithe is 10% of a member's income and it is permitted to tithe on the net income. The members should not tithe on "unearned income" (such as Social Security, old-age assistance, unemployment benefits, pensions, gifts, disability, or similar types of income).

== Doctrines ==
The LCG believes that the Bible is God's inspired revelation to mankind, and as such is complete and inerrant in its original form. The Church has a three-fold mission: 1. To preach the true Gospel of the Kingdom of God (Mark 1:14; Matthew 24:14; Ezekiel 3 and 33), and the name of Jesus Christ (Acts 8:12) to all nations as a witness. 2. To feed the flock and to organize local Church congregations to provide for the spiritual and material needs of our members as God makes it possible (1 Peter 5:1-4; John 21:15-18). 3. To preach the end-time prophecies and to warn the English-speaking nations and all the world of the coming Great Tribulation (Matthew 24:21).

Other beliefs include:

- Binitarianism: The belief that there are two divine Persons in the Godhead rather than the three in Christianity's more common Trinitarianism. These two co-equal and co-eternal Persons are God the Father and God the Son (also called The Word). The Holy Spirit is not a Person, but is considered the very essence, the mind, life, breath, and power of God. Much in the same way the physical world is made of matter, the spiritual world is made of Spirit.
- Non-partisanism: Generally, members should not take part in politics, juries, voting, swearing oaths (members can only "affirm", not swear, in court), or military service.
- British Israelism: The belief that the Anglo-American people are descended from the Lost Ten Tribes of Israel, specifically Ephraim and Manasseh and are the possessors of the birthright promises and accompanying blessings of Abraham's descendants, through his grandson Jacob. Other countries believed to be Israelite are Ireland, Scotland, Wales, Belgium, France, Netherlands, Canada, Australia, New Zealand, Israel, and Denmark.
- Many laws revealed in the Hebrew Scriptures should still be adhered to by Christians today, including clean and unclean animals, mentioned in Leviticus 11 and Deuteronomy 14:3–21, delineating which animals may be eaten. This was also a practice of the first-century Church (see Acts 10:14)
- Christians should observe the biblical seventh-day Sabbath. According to the biblical definition, a day is measured from sunset to sunset, and therefore the Sabbath begins at sunset on Friday, and ends at sunset on Saturday. No business is to be conducted or paid physical labor performed during this time period, nor any personal activities that take away from worship and family time. These include entertainment, such as participating in sporting events (for example, high school football), going to the movies, theater, dance hall, or bar, and watching non-religious movies or television, except news. Feeding livestock and cooking for family members are allowed. The Sabbath is viewed as holy, and set apart by God at creation (Genesis 2:2–3), and is a sign between God and his believers (Exodus 31:13).
- Annual festivals listed in Leviticus 23 and Deuteronomy 16 should be observed by Christians today as they were kept by Jesus, the original apostles, and the first-century Church of God, headquartered at Jerusalem. Members do not celebrate Christmas, Easter, saints' days, Lent, or other traditional Catholic or Christian holy days that were adopted by the Catholic Church (and some Protestant denominations) later in history. Regarding birthday celebrations, while many members do not participate in large birthday parties, a family meal or a day out is often substituted to celebrate and give thanks for another year of life. The new year is very much under some discussion as to where it falls, some believe it to fall in the fall, and some believe it to be in the spring. No official stance is given.

== Media projects ==
Shortly after the LCG's incorporation, it started producing a weekly, half-hour television program: Tomorrow's World. It is carried on 211 television stations throughout the world. In May 2006, the LCG's media department reported that the show was accessible to nearly 78 million American households, or 71 percent of the American television market.

According to reports in March 2007 by Nielsen Research, the program was estimated to reach an average of 50,000 new viewers each week. From 1999 to date, approximately 320 programs have been taped and televised.

The LCG also publishes a free, bi-monthly, subscription magazine titledTomorrow's World. Circulation figures (July 2017), were 282,000 issues. From the magazine's inception in 1999 through to May 2007, 8.3 million copies were produced. Additionally, the church operates a Tomorrow's World website.

The church produces several foreign-language radio programs, which are broadcast on 15 stations. These include a Spanish program titled El Mundo de Mañana ("Tomorrow's World"), presented by Mario Hernández, who also presents the Spanish telecast with the same title. Also, the French program Le Monde Demain ("Tomorrow's World") is broadcast throughout the Caribbean. It was presented by longtime evangelist and radio presenter Dibar K. Apartian until his death in 2010.

== Former online college ==
On February 27, 2007, the LCG launched Living University, a nonprofit, online (distance-learning) institution. The LCG explored accreditation for Living University's undergraduate degrees, diplomas, and certificates, but Living University was never accredited by any agency recognized by the United States Department of Education. More and more states were blocking non-accredited colleges and universities from offering classes within their borders, so it was decided to close Living University. Living University closed on May 14, 2018, after final commencement exercises for 30 students present. In August 2018, the LCG introduced a new program "Living Education".

== Mass shooting by Terry Ratzmann ==
On March 12, 2005, the LCG was thrust into national and international spotlight when member Terry Ratzmann (aged 44) shot at his brethren congregated for church services at the Sheraton Hotel in Brookfield, Wisconsin. It was one of the worst mass shootings in the state's history. Ratzmann killed eight, including his pastor, his pastor's son, and himself. No conclusive motive for the mass murder was reached, though police investigated religious issues as potential motives for the shooting

== Suicide of minister Beyersdorfer ==
"A popular elder and former pastor of the Living Church of God, Karl Beyersdorfer, 73, took his own life May 27, 2016, at his home in Joplin, Mo." He committed suicide just days before his fiftieth wedding anniversary. Depression is thought to have been a factor. A 1966 graduate of Ambassador College, Karl had been an ordained minister for 49 years ministering in the Worldwide Church of God, and then joined Meredith in Global, and then followed him again to the LCG (1998).

== See also ==
- Armstrongism
- Christian observances of Jewish holidays
- Christian views on the Old Covenant
- Restorationism
