= Church of the Great God =

Armstrongist church in South Carolina, United States

- Classification: Armstrongism
- Origin: 1992; Fort Mill, South Carolina

The Church of the Great God (CGG) is one of the Armstrongist Churches of God. It broke away in 1992 from the Worldwide Church of God in the wake of the major shifts in its doctrine during the 1980s and 1990s. The CGG, headquartered in Fort Mill, South Carolina, continues to follow the teachings of Herbert W. Armstrong.

== Formation ==
CGG was organized as a religious non-profit church in January 1992 in Charlotte, North Carolina, with the primary leadership core consisting of Pastor John Ritenbaugh; elders John Reid, Edwin Pope, and James Russell; and Martin Collins and Richard Ritenbaugh. It held its first service via telephone conference call between Charlotte and a small group in Laguna Niguel, California, on January 11, 1992. About 20 members attended. It grew to several hundred members scattered across the United States, with groups in Charlotte; Southern California; Chicago, Illinois; Washington, DC; Atlanta, Georgia; Big Sandy, Texas; Harrisburg, Pennsylvania; Portland, Oregon; Phoenix, Arizona; and several other locations.

== See also ==
- Armstrongism
- British Israelism
- Christian Sabbatarianism
