= Christian observances of Jewish holidays =

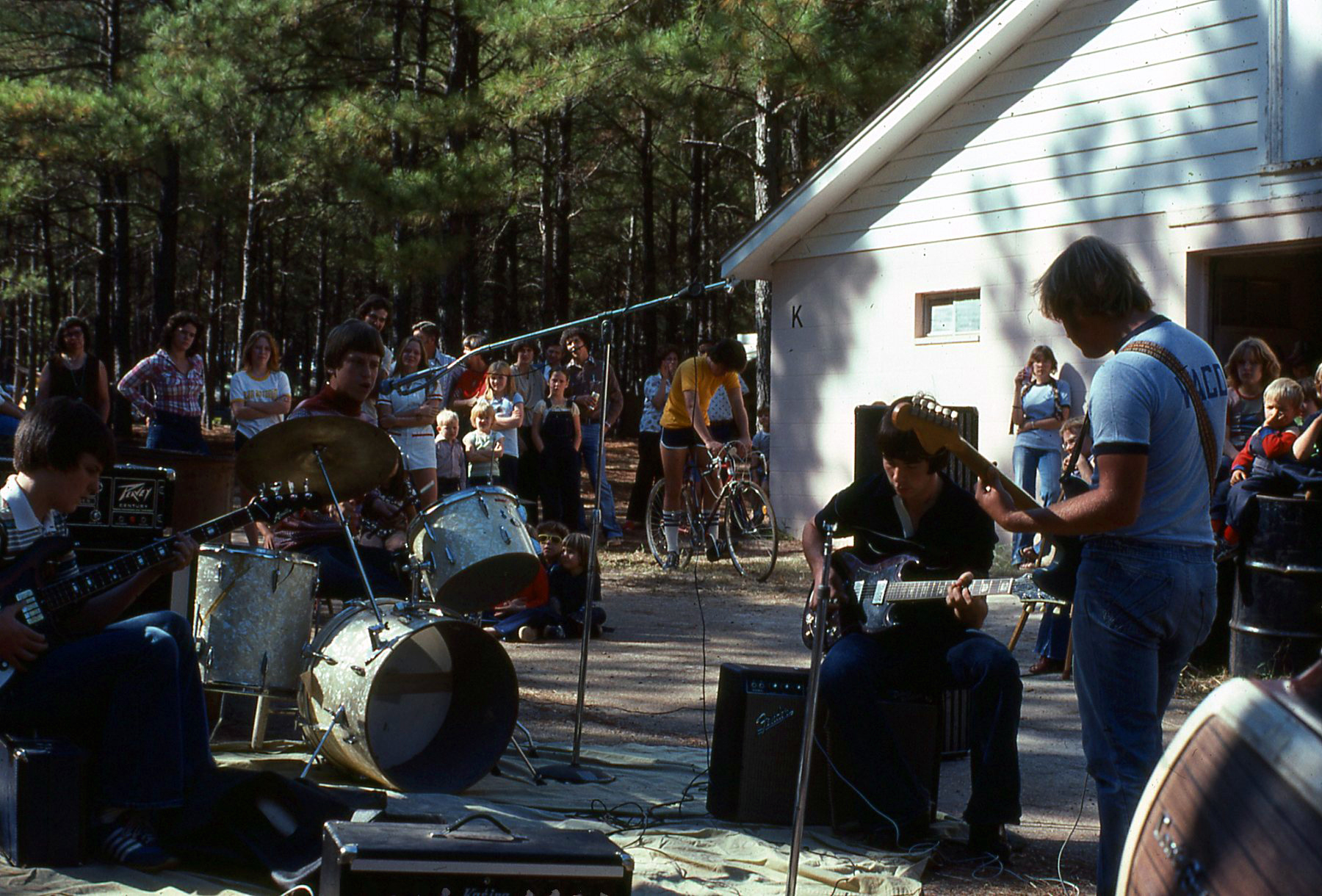
Over 15,000 members of the Worldwide Church of God attended a Christian Feast of Tabernacles observance in Big Sandy, Texas in 1978.

Some Christian groups incorporate Jewish holidays into their religious practice, typically altering and reinterpreting their observation to suit a supersessionist theology.

Supporters point to the Jewish roots of Jesus, and to the tradition that he and the Apostles observed Jewish holidays. Though some early Christian sects like the Jewish Christian did maintain elements of Judaism, the phenomenon is modern, originating in 20th century Evangelical movements like Hebrew Roots, Messianic Judaism, and Armstrongism.

Many of the Jewish practices appropriated by these groups originated in modern rabbinic Judaism, long postdating early Christianity. Such Christian observances have been described by some as an offensive form of cultural appropriation and a misinterpretation of Jewish traditions. Within Christianity, critics question the practice's theological consistency and its potential to harm interfaith relationships.

== Background ==
Specific practices vary among denominations: these holidays may be honored in their original form in recognition of Christianity's Jewish roots or altered to suit Christian theology. Symbolic and thematic features of Jewish services are commonly interpreted in a Christian light: for example, the Paschal Lamb of the Passover Seder is viewed as a symbol of Christ's sacrifice.

As a group these Christians form non-denominational alliances such as Christians for Israel and Christians United for Israel; they also form the root of a global, cross-denominational movement called Messianic Judaism, and of its offshoot known as Hebrew Roots.

A small number of Christian denominations — including the Messianic Jews, some congregations of the Church of God (Seventh Day), the World Mission Society Church of God, Hebrew Roots, Pentecostals and a variety of Church of God groups instruct their members to observe the religious holidays described in the Tanakh, but interpreted, they believe, in the light of the New Testament. Some Seventh-day Adventists have also adopted the Jewish holidays against the wishes of the denominational leaders. Most of these denominations also eschew the observance of Christmas and Easter, believing them to be later, pagan corruptions.

Most point to the tradition that Jesus's parents kept God's holy days, that Jesus himself kept God's holy days during his ministry, and that the Apostles observed the same feasts after they were called "Christians". The Book of Acts chapter 2 records that the start of the Christian Church began on a biblical feast day: "And when the day of Pentecost has fully come, they were all with one accord in one place."

Many of these Christians believe that the intended purpose of all of the biblical holy days is to foreshadow or point to the identity of the Messiah, citing that Paul the Apostle confirms this view by linking Jesus' sacrifice to the fulfilment of the Jewish feast of Passover. Jesus was not only declared the "Lamb of God" by John the Baptist, a reference to the Passover lamb but was also presented as the Lamb in Jerusalem on 10 Nisan, then four days later crucified on precisely the day Jews brought the Passover sacrifice, 14 Nisan.

== Christian Passover ==
It is not common for mainstream Christians to celebrate Passover. Some regard Passover as superseded by Easter and the Passover lamb as supplanted by the Eucharist. But there are Christian groups, Messianic Jews, Hebrew Roots, and some congregations of the Church of God (Seventh Day), that celebrate some parts of the Jewish holiday of Passover.

As well, there are mainstream Christians from historic liturgical traditions (i.e., Catholic, Anglican, Lutheran, etc.), who celebrate the Passover Seder in order to provide historical and cultural background for Maundy Thursday, part of the Paschal Triduum, during Holy Week., and some Christians eat lamb, bitter herbs and unleavened bread. Others follow the instructions (Matthew 26:26–28; Mark 14:22–24; Luke 22:19–20) that Jesus gave to his disciples at the Last Supper before he was crucified, and share bread (usually unleavened) and wine instead of roasted lamb. In some versions, the ceremony is combined with washing one another's feet, as Jesus did for his disciples the night that he suffered (John 13:5–14).

The main Christian view seems to present the Passover meal, which was held on the night before Jesus died, also named Last Supper, as the Evening of New Covenant. The Christian view also seems to present the Day of First Fruit, which was held according to Jewish law on the day after Saturday during the Feast of Unleavened Bread, as Resurrection Sunday (also known as Easter). Christian Passover is a religious observance celebrated by a small number of 1st-century believers instead of, or alongside, the more common Christian holy day and festival of Easter. The redemption from the bondage of sin through the sacrifice of Christ is celebrated, a parallel of the Jewish Passover's celebration of redemption from bondage in the land of Egypt.

Mar Thoma Christians of India celebrate a version of Passover on Maundy Thursday, called pesaha appam. It is particularly common among the endogamous subgroup the Knanaya.

== Christian Feast of Weeks (Pentecost) ==
The traditional Christian holiday of Pentecost is based on the Jewish holiday of Shavuot celebrated seven weeks after the start of Passover. Pentecost is part of the Movable Cycle of the ecclesiastical year. Pentecost is always seven weeks after the day after the Sabbath day which always occurs during the feast of unleavened bread. Rabbinic Jews avoid celebration of Shavuot on the day after the Sabbath (the first day of the week). However, Haymanot and Karaite Jews celebrate this holy day according to Scriptural mandate on the day after the Sabbath. This Sunday celebration, in Christian tradition, is calculated as 50 days after Easter (inclusive of Easter Day). In other words, it falls on the eighth Sunday, counting Easter Day.

Pentecost celebrates the birth of the Church, when thousands of Jews were in Jerusalem to celebrate Shavuot, and heard Peter and the disciples speaking in their own language. However, Shavuot is one of the Three Pilgrimage Festivals laid out for the Torah observant Jews, which was the reason for the huge gathering of Jewish believers in Jerusalem on that same day.

== Christian Feast of Trumpets ==
Rosh Hashanah is celebrated by a number of Christian denominations and unincorporated house church groups within the United States, including: Messianic Jews, some congregations of the Church of God (Seventh Day), some evangelical Protestant churches (mainly Baptist), as well as Seventh Day Pentecostals in Eastern Europe. This day of resounding is also known in Judaism by the name "Yom Teruah" and in Christianity as the Feast of Trumpets.

Christian believers connect hearing "the sound of the trumpet" or shofar, according to the First Epistle to the Thessalonians and the Book of Revelation, with the events that occur at the resurrection of the dead ("For the Lord Himself will descend from heaven with a loud cry of summons, with the shout of an archangel, and with the blast of the trumpet of God. And those who have departed this life in Christ will rise first." 1Thess 4:16, Revelation 1:10).

Some say this "pivotal event of all human history to which the Feast of Trumpets points is the Return of Christ". Some evangelical television channels call Rosh Hashanna eve the "Feast of Trumpets", for example at CBN TV that marks the Jewish New Year with a staff gathering for Rosh Hashanah.

=== Latter Day Saint movement ===
Joseph Smith is said to have received the golden plates (which became The Book of Mormon) on the Rosh Hashanah on 22 September 1827. Biblical references and interpretation by Jewish sages through the centuries set this day as the day God would remember his covenants with Israel to bring them back from exile. On this day ritual trumpet blasts signify the issuance of revelation and a call for Israel to gather for God's word of redemption. Set at the time of Israel's final agricultural harvest, the day also symbolizes the Lord's final harvest of souls. Furthermore, it initiates the completion of the Lord's time periods, the Days of Awe, and signifies the last time to prepare for final judgment and the Messianic Age. The coming forth of the Book of Mormon is said to be fulfilling such prophecies of the day.

== Christian Day of Atonement ==
It is not common for mainstream Christians to observe Yom Kippur (the Day of Atonement). The New Testament refers to the Day of Atonement in Acts 27:9, but does not specify whether or not Christians were observing it.

In the Roman calendar still observed by Traditionalist Catholics, the Michaelmas Ember days (the Wednesday, Friday and Saturday of the first full week after 14 September (the Feast of the Exaltation of the Holy Cross, or "Roodmas")) are penitential days inspired by the Jewish solemnities of the “seventh month,” Tishrei (תִּשְׁרֵי), especially Yom Kippur. Those days' first Lesson (liturgical reading) focuses on the Old Covenant’s Day of Atonement and the fast of the seventh month (Lev. 23, 26-32).

Assuming an apostolic practice of observing Yom Kippur, a small number of evangelical Christians observe it today. Among congregations of the Churches of God, the Day of Atonement is observed as an annual Sabbath where members fast in observance of Leviticus 23:27-29. Most, like Roderick C. Meredith, former leader of the Living Church of God, also believe that the Day of Atonement "pictures the binding of Satan at the beginning of the Millennium and the world becoming at one with God". Children and those with medical conditions for whom fasting could be detrimental are not expected to participate.

Many groups affiliated with Messianic Judaism have provided instruction describing the evangelical significance for observance of this day.

One rationale for celebrating the Day of Atonement is that the Apostle Paul celebrated it and would not miss it during a storm on a ship. Acts 27:9 reads, "Since much time had been lost and sailing was now dangerous, because even the Fast had already gone by, Paul advised them".

Christian observances of Yom Kippur occur when a Christian-style Day of Atonement models itself on the Jewish holiday of Yom Kippur.

=== Roman Catholicism ===
In the Roman calendar still observed by Traditionalist Catholics, the Michaelmas Ember days (the Wednesday, Friday and Saturday of the first full week after 14 September (the Feast of the Exaltation of the Holy Cross, or "Roodmas") are penitential days inspired by the Jewish solemnities of the “seventh month,” Tishrei (תִּשְׁרֵי), especially Yom Kippur. Those days' first Lesson (liturgical reading) focuses on the Old Covenant’s Day of Atonement and the fast of the seventh month (Lev. 23, 26-32).

=== Sabbatarian churches ===
As observed by the Living Church of God and United Church of God:

The Christian Day of Atonement is based on the English translation of the Jewish Holy day Yom Kippur. The day is commemorated with a 25-hour fast by Jews, but normally a 24-hour fast by Christians who observe it. While not observed by the mainstream of professing Christianity, the Christian groups (mostly those with origins in the old Worldwide Church of God) that do observe it usually refer to it as the Day of Atonement...

Generally, the Sacred Name Movement and groups reject Easter and Christmas as pagan in origin and observe the holy days of Leviticus 23 such as Yom Kippur, as well as Passover and the Feast of Weeks.

=== Messianic Jewish congregations ===
Messianic Jewish congregations devote serious effort at presenting a rationale for taking Yom Kippur. Such as by the Emmanuel Messianic Jewish Congregation (Clarksville, Maryland, USA):

For believers in Yeshua, both Jewish and non-Jewish, the observance of Yom Kippur can hold special significance. The repentance started at Rosh HaShanah comes to a culmination with atonement ten days later. As with the traditional Jewish community, those ten days (Yomim Nora'im) can take on spiritual meaning as we meditate on the meaning of the high holy days. Although there are not many customs directly relating to the ten days, the message could be applied to a believer's daily meditation at that time. Traditional readings from the book of Jonah, Hosea 14 and other pertinent passages can enhance one's appreciation of the season...Blessed be the Lord God, who has secured our salvation in Yeshua the Messiah! That is what Yom Kippur is all about for those who call on his name...

==== Jews for Jesus ====
Jews for Jesus describes its observances of this day as follows:

...Yom Kippur can be somewhat of a conundrum to Jewish believers in Y'shua. Do we fast and confess our sins like the rest of the Jewish community or do we rejoice in the knowledge that we're forgiven in Messiah? Many Jewish believers view Yom Kippur as a time for identification with our Jewish people, introspection for ourselves and intercession for loved ones, knowing all the while that Jesus is the One that makes us at one with God...

=== Criticism ===
Some argue that celebrating this holiday in the Christian faith is redundant in that Christians no longer observe the Day of Atonement since Christ has atoned for all sins once and for all.

== Christian Feast of Tabernacles ==
=== Early church history ===
Jesus observed the Jewish Sukkot (the Feast of Tabernacles or Festival of Booths) during his ministry (see John 7:1–52). Referring to Paul the Apostle, Acts 18:20–21 states: "When they desired him to tarry longer time with them, he consented not; but bade them farewell, saying, I must keep this feast that cometh in Jerusalem: but I will return again to you, if God will. And he sailed from Ephesus." Scholars debate which feast this refers to, but Protestant scholar Thomas Lewin concluded that Paul was referring to the Feast of Tabernacles.

In the 2nd century, Jewish Christians certainly kept the Feast of Tabernacles, according to 20th century Catholic scholar Cardinal Jean Danielou, where its celebration was tied to millenarianism as it is with many Christians who observe it today. Its observance was centered in the Asiatic environment to which both Papias and Cerinthus belonged. Cardinal Danielou also saw references to the Feast of Tabernacles in the Shepherd of Hermas, which would indicate that around that time some in Rome also observed it, though he believes that later on they transferred it to become something else. According to Jerome of Stridon, Polycarp also kept the Feast of Tabernacles in the 2nd century in Asia Minor.

Methodius of Olympus (died c. 311) taught that Christians should observe the Feast of Tabernacles, and he also tied it to the teaching of the millennial reign of Christ: "For since in six days God made the heaven and earth, and finished the whole world, and rested on the seventh day from all His works which He had made, and blessed the seventh day and sanctified it, so by a figure in the seventh month, when the fruits of the earth have been gathered in, we are commanded to keep the feast to the Lord, which signified that, when this world shall be terminated at the seventh thousand years, when God shall have completed the world, He shall rejoice in us."

Didymus the Blind (c. 313-398) also enjoined the observance of the Feast of Tabernacles, and cited 2 Peter 1:14 and 2 Cor. 5:4, where he identified the temporary dwelling with the human body, saying that only those who preserve the purity of their bodies and spirits will celebrate the Feast of Tabernacles, and that Sukkot will be celebrated in the next world at the resurrection, when the saved will rise into an incorruptible body, rising up in power and glory to become a sacred dwelling.

After the rise of Emperor Constantine, Christian observance of the Feast of Tabernacles became increasingly viewed as heretical by the developing Catholic church. In the 4th century, Epiphanius discusses Nazarene Christians who kept the Jewish Holy Days in various locations in his time, a practice which he considered heretical. John Chrysostom (of Constantinople) commented that people who professed Christ in his area were also observing the Feast of Tabernacles, which he also considered heretical, as did Jerome of Stridon in the 4th and 5th centuries, who notes that these Christians also gave the feast a millenarian significance.

=== Post-reformation ===
Nevertheless, a small number of Christian groups continued to observe the Feast of Tabernacles outside of the sphere of the Catholic Church. In 1588, the Szekler Sabbatarians of Transylvania united under the unitarian nobleman András Eőssi, observed Christian versions of all of the biblical Jewish Holy Days including the Feast of Tabernacles. They also rejected the observance of Christmas, Easter, and New Year's Day. Within a decade, they grew to be represented in many towns and villages, mainly centered in the towns of Szekely-Keresztur (today the Romanian town of Cristuru-Secuiesc) and Koropatak (today Bodoc), and a number of Hungarian villages. They developed a hymn book with songs specifically for Christian observance of the Jewish Holy Days They considered themselves as converted gentiles who had inherited from the Jews the eternally binding law, which God had given. By 1637, there were believed to number between 15,000 and 20,000, until they attracted the attention of the Hungarian parliament. In 1600 a decree was passed which allowed their estates and properties to be confiscated, and in 1618, a decree was passed in Cluj with the approval of Prince Bethlen to solve the "Jewish Christian Problem" by giving them one year to rejoin one of the reorganized churches. Soon afterward, their books were confiscated and burnt. By the end of the mid 17th century, they still were represented in at least eleven towns and villages in Transylvania, but by 1865 only about 170-180 members remained in the town of Bozod-Ujfalu (near Gyula Feheruar). The group was later absorbed into Judaism during the 1930s.

In 1900, the Feast of Tabernacles was formally celebrated by the Southern Baptists at Falls Creek Encampment. There are pictures of the original Falls Creek Tabernacle with the blowing of the shofar to call to service. It was also celebrated heavily among those in the south, known as Bush Arbors, as late as the 1960s. From this movement came the history of tent revivals, which birthed the world-wide evangelist Billy Graham.

Today, the Feast of Booths, or Tabernacles or Sukkot, is celebrated by a growing number of groups, including Messianic Jews, Church of God groups, and Apollo Quiboloy's Kingdom of Jesus Christ church in the Philippines, as well as the International Christian Embassy Jerusalem (ICEJ). They cite God's and the prophets' injunctions in the Old Testament that the Israelites observe the holiday, and accounts in the New Testament of how Jesus and his apostles kept this commandment.

=== Modern practice ===
Today, actual observance practice varies. Churches may construct a communal sukkah, on church property or elsewhere, in which services are held and meals eaten, and in some congregations, dancing. In some congregations, individuals may construct their own booths which may be slept in, or where only meals may be eaten. Some members may send or exchange greeting cards prior to the event, participate in special meals, music, and worship services, and give alms. Among congregations of the Church of God tradition, church leadership selects a Feast site designed to serve a large geographic area which includes a rented hall for congregational meetings and various amenities. Members travel and stay in tents at local campgrounds or (more commonly) stay in a hotel where they may attend daily worship services and participate in recreation, fellowship, sight-seeing, and church activities for eight days. As with many Christians who have observed it in the past, it is tied to Christ's millennial reign on earth, believed to be a time of great spiritual and physical blessing for all mankind. Members are instructed to save a tenth of their income as part of a second tithe to spend on themselves and their families in order to have the means to observe all the holidays, but particularly the Feast of Tabernacles.

== Criticism ==
=== Within Christianity ===
Some critics of Christian observances of Jewish holidays have echoed the comments of the 4th century theologian John Chrysostom who said,

The festivals of the pitiful and miserable Jews are soon to march upon us one after the other and in quick succession: the feast of Trumpets, the feast of Tabernacles, the fasts. There are many in our ranks who say they think as we do. Yet some of these are going to watch the festivals and others will join the Jews in keeping their feasts and observing their fasts. I wish to drive this perverse custom from the Church right now.

The second century bishop of Hierapolis, Claudius Apollinaris, voiced his objections to how some were either keeping the Passover, or how some were interpreting the events that formed the foundation of the Christian custom.

Apollinaris wrote:

There are, then, some who through ignorance raise disputes about these things (though their conduct is pardonable: for ignorance is no subject for blame — it rather needs further instruction), and say that on the fourteenth day the Lord ate the lamb with the disciples, and that on the great day of the feast of unleavened bread He Himself suffered; and they quote Matthew as speaking in accordance with their view. Wherefore their opinion is contrary to the law, and the Gospels seem to be at variance with them. … The fourteenth day, the true Passover of the Lord; the great sacrifice, the Son of God instead of the lamb, who was bound, who bound the strong, and who was judged, though Judge of living and dead, and who was delivered into the hands of sinners to be crucified, who was lifted up on the horns of the unicorn, and who was pierced in His holy side, who poured forth from His side the two purifying elements, water and blood, word and spirit, and who was buried on the day of the Passover, the stone being placed upon the tomb.

Some Christians, like the popular evangelist John Hagee believe that the observance of Jewish holidays by Christians is educationally valuable, but they do not believe that it is obligatory. Others fear that the observance of Jewish holidays by Christians inevitably leads them to slide into Judaism, but there is little evidence to justify their fear.

== See also ==
- Biblical law in Christianity
- Cultural appropriation
- Judaizers
