= Sabbath in seventh-day churches =

Part of the beliefs and practices of seventh-day churches

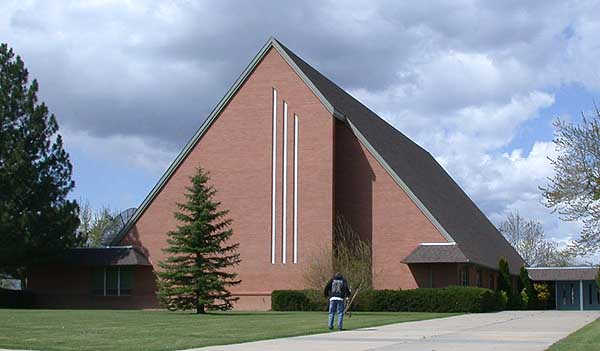
A Seventh-day Adventist church in Campion, Colorado

The seventh-day Sabbath, observed from Friday evening to Saturday evening, is an important part of the beliefs and practices of seventh-day churches. These churches emphasize biblical references such as the ancient Hebrew practice of beginning a day at sundown, and the Genesis creation narrative wherein an "evening and morning" established a day, predating the giving of the Ten Commandments (thus the command to "remember" the sabbath). They hold that the Old and New Testament show no variation in the doctrine of the Sabbath on the seventh day. Saturday, or the seventh day in the weekly cycle, is the only day in all of scripture designated using the term Sabbath. The seventh day of the week is recognized as Sabbath in many languages, calendars, and doctrines, including those of Catholic, Lutheran, and Orthodox churches.^{[a]}

It is still observed in modern Judaism in relation to Mosaic Law. In addition, Oriental Orthodox churches, and specifically the Orthodox Tewahedo Churches, are known to observe the Sabbath on Saturday, in addition to the Lord's Day on Sunday, an ancient Christian practice deriving from the Apostolic Constitutions.

Catholic, Orthodox, and some Protestant denominations observe the Lord's Day on Sunday and hold that the Saturday Sabbath is no longer binding for Christians. On the other hand, Congregationalists, Presbyterians, Methodists, and Baptists, as well as many Episcopalians, have historically espoused the view of first-day Sabbatarianism, describing the Sabbath as being transferred to the Lord's Day (Sunday), the first day of the week, merged with the day of Christ's resurrection, forming the Christian Sabbath.

"Seventh-day Sabbatarians" are Christians who seek to reestablish the practice of all early Christians who kept the Sabbath according to normal Jewish practice. They usually believe that all humanity is obliged to keep the Ten Commandments, including the Sabbath, and that keeping all the commandments is a moral responsibility that honors, and shows love towards God as creator, sustainer, and redeemer. Christian seventh-day Sabbatarians hold beliefs similar to that tradition that the change of the sabbath was part of a Great Apostasy in the Christian faith. Some of these, most notably the Seventh-day Adventist Church, have traditionally held that the apostate church formed when the Bishop of Rome began to dominate the west and brought heathen corruption and allowed pagan idol worship and beliefs to come in, and formed the Roman Catholic Church, which teaches traditions over Scripture, and to rest from their work on Sunday, instead of Sabbath, which is not in keeping with Scripture.

The sabbath is one of the defining characteristics of seventh-day denominations, including Seventh Day Baptists, Sabbatarian Adventists (Seventh-day Adventists, Davidian Seventh-day Adventists, Church of God (Seventh Day) conferences, etc.), Sabbatarian Pentecostalists (Soldiers of the Cross Church, and others), Armstrongism (Church of God International (United States), House of Yahweh, Intercontinental Church of God, United Church of God, etc.), modern day Hebrew Roots movement, the Seventh-Day Evangelist Church, the True Jesus Church, among many others.

== Biblical Sabbath ==
The sabbath was first described in the biblical account of the seventh day of creation. Observation and remembrance of the sabbath is one of the Ten Commandments (the fourth in the Eastern Orthodox and most Protestant traditions, the third in Roman Catholic and Lutheran traditions). Most people who observe the first-day or seventh-day sabbath regard it as having been instituted as a perpetual covenant: "Wherefore the children of Israel shall keep the sabbath, to observe the sabbath throughout their generations, for a perpetual covenant." (Exodus 31:13–17) (see also Exodus 23:12, Deuteronomy 5:13–14) This rule also applies to strangers within their gates, a sign of respect for the day during which God rested after having completed creation in six days (Genesis 2:2–3, Exodus 20:8–11).

== History ==
=== Early church ===
In contrast to the majority of Christian denominations, Seventh Day churches see the adoption of Sunday as the Sabbath as a late development that would not have been recognised by the Early Church. Seventh Day Adventist theologian Samuele Bacchiocchi argued for a gradual transition from the Jewish observation of the Sabbath on Saturday to observation on a Sunday. His contention was that the change was due to pagan influence from the pagan converts, to social pressure against Judaism, and also to the decline of standards for the day. From Sabbath to Sunday (1977), He claims that the first day became called the "Lord's Day" as that was the name known as the sun-god Baal to the pagans so they were familiar with it and put forth by the leaders in Rome to gain converts and got picked up by the Christians in Rome to differentiate themselves from the Jews, who had rebelled, and the Sabbath. According to Justin Martyr (lived 100 to 165), Christians also worshiped on Sunday because it "possessed a certain mysterious import". Seventh-day Adventists point out the role played by either the Pope, or by Roman Emperor Constantine I in the transition from Sabbath to Sunday, with Constantine's law declaring that Sunday was a day of rest for those not involved in farming work. In Rich Robinson's 2014 book, Christ in the Sabbath, he writes that:

"On March 3, 321, Constantine put into law a requirement that there be public rest from work on Sundays, except for those engaged in farming. [...] But Constantine called [Sunday] the 'day of the sun' and it is hard to figure out just why he promulgated this law."

According to R. J. Bauckham, the post-apostolic church had diverse practices regarding the sabbath.

Emperor Aurelian began a new Sun cult in 274 A.D and pagan ordinances were instituted in order to transform the old Roman idolatry and the accession of Sun-worship. Emperor Constantine then enacted the first Sunday Laws, for "the venerable Day of the Sun" in 321 A.D. On March 7, 321, the Roman emperor Constantine I issued a decree making Sunday a day of rest from labor, stating:

All judges and city people and the craftsmen shall rest upon the venerable day of the sun. Country people, however, may freely attend to the cultivation of the fields, because it frequently happens that no other days are better adapted for planting the grain in the furrows or the vines in trenches. So that the advantage given by heavenly providence may not for the occasion of a short time perish.

Hutton Webster's book Rest Days states:

"This legislation by Constantine probably bore no relation to Christianity; it appears, on the contrary, that the emperor, in his capacity of Pontifex Maximus, was only adding the day of the Sun, the worship of which was then firmly established in the Roman Empire, to the other ferial days of the sacred calendar… What began, however, as a pagan ordinance, ended as a Christian regulation; and a long series of imperial decrees, during the fourth, fifth, and sixth centuries, enjoined with increasing stringency abstinence from labour on Sunday."

Early Christian observance of both the spiritual seventh-day sabbath and a Lord's Day assembly is evidenced in a letter from Ignatius of Antioch to the Magnesians c. 110. The Pseudo-Ignatian additions amplified this point by combining weekly observance of a spiritual seventh-day sabbath with the Lord's assembly. If Pseudo-Ignatius dates as early as 140, its admonition must be considered important evidence on 2nd-century sabbath and Lord's Day observance. According to classical sources, widespread seventh-day sabbath rest by gentile Christians was also the prevailing mode in the 3rd and 4th centuries.

Ellen G. White (lived 1827-1915) states that ecumenical councils generally each pressed the sabbath down slightly lower and exalted Sunday correspondingly, and that the bishops eventually urged Constantine to syncretize the worship day in order to promote the nominal acceptance of Christianity by pagans. But "while many God-fearing Christians were gradually led to regard Sunday as possessing a degree of sacredness, they still held the [seventh-day] Sabbath". Bauckham also states some church authorities continued to oppose this as a judaizing tendency.

In the 4th century, Socrates Scholasticus (Church History, Book V) stated:

For although almost all churches throughout the world celebrate the sacred mysteries on the sabbath of every week, yet the Christians of Alexandria and at Rome, on account of some ancient tradition, have ceased to do this. The Egyptians in the neighborhood of Alexandria, and the inhabitants of Thebaïs, hold their religious assemblies on the sabbath, but do not participate in the mysteries in the manner usual among Christians in general: for after having eaten and satisfied themselves with food of all kinds, in the evening making their offerings they partake of the mysteries.

In the 5th century, Sozomen (Ecclesiastical History, Book VII), referencing Socrates Scholasticus, added to his description:

Assemblies are not held in all churches on the same time or manner. The people of Constantinople, and almost everywhere, assemble together on the Sabbath, as well as on the first day of the week, which custom is never observed at Rome or at Alexandria. There are several cities and villages in Egypt where, contrary to the usage established elsewhere, the people meet together on Sabbath evenings, and, although they have dined previously, partake of the mysteries.

=== Middle Ages ===
The "Sabbath in Africa Study Group" (SIA), founded by Charles E. Bradford in 1991, holds that the sabbath has existed in Africa since the beginning of recorded history. Taddesse Tamrat has argued that this practice predates Saint Ewostatewos's advocacy of observing both Saturday and Sunday as days of sabbath, which led to his eventual exile from Ethiopia around 1337. Emperor Zara Yaqob convened a synod at Tegulet in 1450 to discuss the sabbath question.

Sects, such as the Waldenses, retained sabbath observance in Europe during the Middle Ages. In Bohemia, as much as one quarter of the population kept seventh-day the sabbath in 1310. This practice continued until at least the 16th century, when Erasmus wrote about the practice.

The Unitarian Church condemned Sabbatarianism as innovation (forbidden by the Transylvanian law on religious toleration) in 1618. The last Sabbatarian congregation in Transylvania disappeared in the 19th century and the remaining Sabbatarians, who were known as "Somrei Sabat" (the Hungarian transliteration of the Hebrew words for "Sabbath observers") joined the existing Jewish communities, into which they were eventually absorbed. Sabbatarianism also expanded into Russia, where its adherents were called Subbotniks, and, from there, the movement expanded into other countries. Some of the Russian Subbotniks maintained a Christian identity doctrinally, while others formally converted to Judaism and assimilated within the Jewish communities of Russia. Some of the latter, however, who had become Jewish, although they and their descendants practiced Judaism and had not practiced Christianity for nearly two centuries, still retained a distinct identity as ethnic Russian converts to Judaism until later.

A small number of the anti-Trinitarian Socinian churches of Eastern Europe and the Netherlands adopted the seventh day as the day of worship and rest.

=== Reformation ===
At the time of the Protestant Reformation some Anabaptists, such as Oswald Glaidt, argued that the seventh day should be observed as the sabbath and that Sunday sabbath was an invention of the Pope. Andreas Karlstadt defended the observance of the seventh day of the week. Martin Luther differed from him as he believed that Christians were free to observe any day of the week, provided it was uniform. His defense of the Sabbath, and others among the Anabaptists, caused him to be censured as a Jew and a heretic.

Seventh-day Sabbatarianism was revived in 17th-century England. Early advocates included the Elizabethan Seventh-Day Men, the Traskites (after John Traske, 1586–1636), Dorothy Traske, Hamlet Jackson, and Thomas Brabourne. In 1650, James Ockford published in London the book The Doctrine of the Fourth Commandment, Deformed by Popery, Reformed & Restored to its Primitive Purity, which was the first writings of a Baptist defending Sabbath observance. The book generated such a nuisance that the mayor of Salisbury, the city where Ockford lived, asked the president of Parliament for guidance on how to handle the work; a parliamentary committee determined that all copies should be burned without giving the opportunity for James Ockford to defend them. Only one copy has escaped, kept today in a library in Oxford. The majority of seventh-day Sabbatarians were part of the Seventh Day Baptist church and experienced harsh opposition from Anglican authorities and Puritans. The first Seventh Day Baptist church in the United States was established in Newport, Rhode Island in 1671.

== Modern churches ==
=== Seventh Day Baptists ===
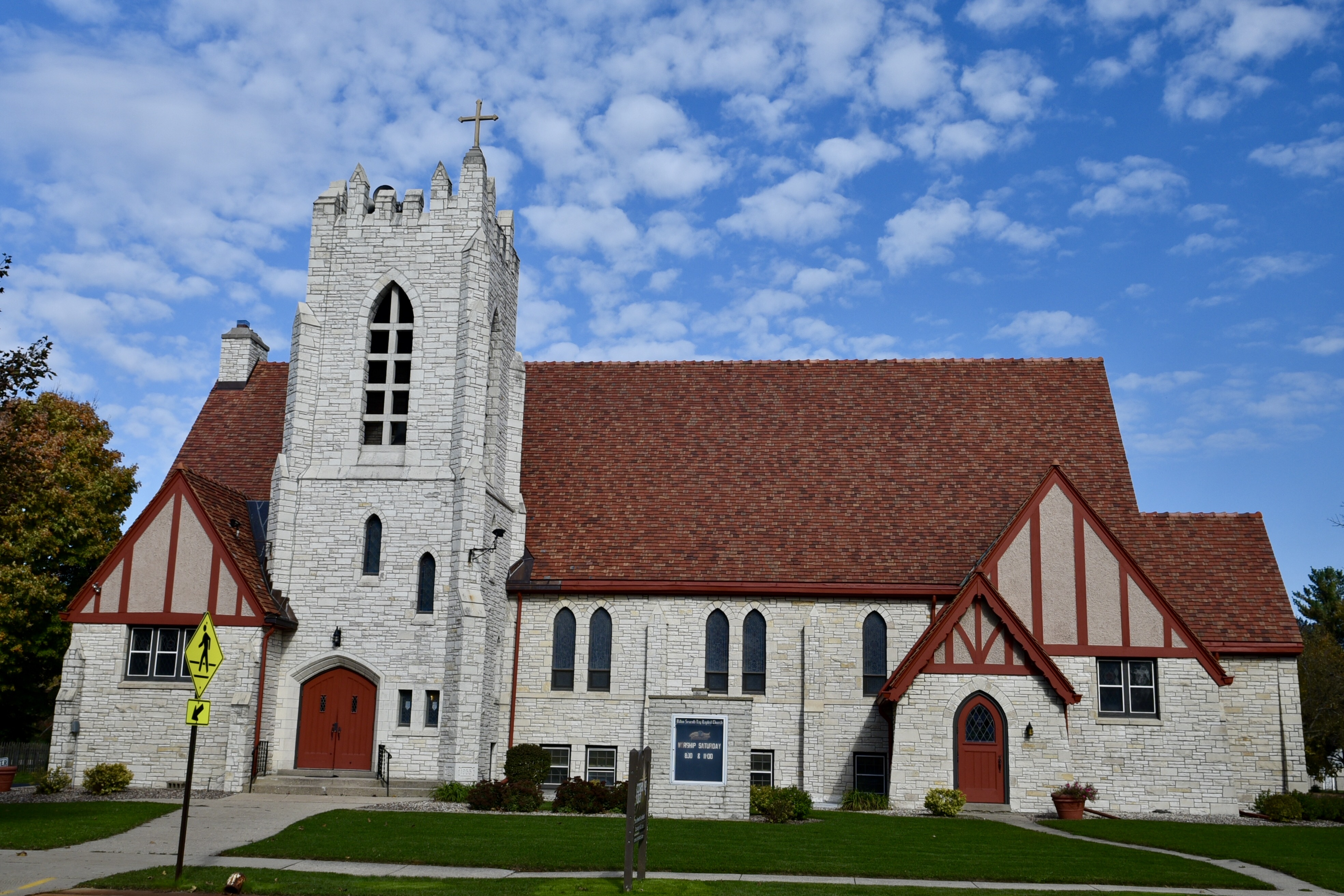
A Seventh Day Baptist Church in Milton, Wisconsin

Seventh Day Baptists are Christian Baptists who observe seventh-day Sabbath, as a holy day to God. They understand that observance is as a sign of obedience in a covenant relationship with God and not as a condition of salvation. They adopt a covenant Baptist theology, based on the concept of regenerated society, conscious baptism of believers by immersion, congregational government and the scriptural basis of opinion and practice.

The first known Seventh Day Baptist Church was the Mill Yard Church established in London, where the first service took place in 1651, led by Peter Chamberlen. M.D. "the Third". The first records of church activities were destroyed in a fire; the second record book is in possession of the Seventh Day Baptist Historical Library and Archives, the local church continues its activities to this day. Immigration to the British colonies in North America also included Seventh Day Baptists, the couple Stephen and Anne Mumford were the first Seventh Day Baptists in the Americas and with five other Baptists who kept the Sabbath, establishing in 1672 the first Seventh Day Baptist Church in the Americas, located in Newport, expanding into other territories.

It is the oldest modern Sabbatarian denomination, they are made up of churches all over the world, with over 520 churches and approximately 45,000 members, having constant interaction among themselves through conferences in each country and through the Seventh Day Baptist World Federation.

=== Sabbatarian Adventists ===
==== Seventh-day Adventists ====
The Seventh-day Adventist Church is the largest modern seventh-day Sabbatarian denomination, with 21,414,779 members as of December 31, 2018 and holds the sabbath as one of the Pillars of Adventism. Seventh-day Adventism grew out of the Millerite movement in the 1840s, and a few of its founders (Cyrus Farnsworth, Frederick Wheeler, a Methodist minister and Joseph Bates, a sea captain) were convinced in 1844-1845 of the importance of Sabbatarianism under the influence of Rachel Oakes Preston, a young Seventh Day Baptist laywoman living in Washington, New Hampshire and a published article in early 1845 on the topic (Hope of Israel) by Thomas M. Preble, pastor of the Free Will Baptist congregation in Nashua, New Hampshire.

Seventh-day Adventists observe the sabbath from Friday evening to Saturday evening. In places where the sun does not appear or does not set for several months, such as northern Scandinavia, the tendency is to regard an arbitrary time such as 6 p.m. as "sunset". During the sabbath, Adventists avoid secular work and business, although medical relief and humanitarian work is accepted. Though there are cultural variations, most Adventists also avoid activities such as shopping, sport, and certain forms of entertainment. Adventists typically gather for church services on Saturday morning. Some also gather on Friday evening to welcome in the sabbath hours (sometimes called "vespers" or "opening Sabbath"), and some similarly gather at "closing Sabbath".

Traditionally, Seventh-day Adventists hold that the Ten Commandments (including the fourth commandment concerning the sabbath) are part of the moral law of God, not abrogated by the teachings of Jesus Christ, which apply equally to Christians. Adventists have traditionally distinguished between "moral law" and "ceremonial law", arguing that moral law continues to bind Christians, while events predicted by the ceremonial law were fulfilled by Christ's death on the cross.

==== History ====
"Sabbatarian Adventists" emerged between 1845 and 1849 from within the Adventist movement of William Miller, later to become the Seventh-day Adventists. Frederick Wheeler began keeping the seventh day as the sabbath after personally studying the issue in March 1844 following a conversation with Rachel Preston, according to his later report. He is reputed to be the first ordained Adventist minister to preach in support of the sabbath. Several members of the church in Washington, New Hampshire, to whom he occasionally ministered, also followed his decision, forming the first Sabbatarian Adventist church. These included William Farnsworth and his brother Cyrus. T. M. Preble soon accepted it from either Wheeler, Oakes, or someone else at the church. These events preceded the Great Disappointment, which followed shortly after, when Jesus did not return as Millerites expected on October 22, 1844.

Preble was the first Millerite to promote the sabbath in print form, through the February 28, 1845, issue of the Adventist Hope of Israel in Portland, Maine. In March he published his sabbath views in tract form as A Tract, Showing that the Seventh Day Should be Observed as the Sabbath, Instead of the First Day; "According to the Commandment". This tract led to the conversion of John Nevins Andrews and other Adventist families in Paris, Maine, as well as the 1845 conversion of Joseph Bates, who became the foremost proponent of the sabbath among this group. These men in turn convinced James Springer White, Ellen Harmon (later White), and Hiram Edson of New York. Preble is known to have kept seventh-day sabbath until mid-1847. He later repudiated the sabbath and opposed the Seventh-day Adventists, authoring The First-Day Sabbath.

Bates proposed an 1846 meeting among the believers in New Hampshire and New York, which took place at Edson's farm in Port Gibson, where Edson and other Port Gibson believers readily accepted the sabbath message and forged an alliance with Bates, White, and Harmon. Between April 1848 and December 1850, 22 sabbath conferences in New York and New England allowed White, Bates, Edson, and Stephen Pierce to reach conclusions about doctrinal issues.

Also in 1846, a pamphlet written by Bates created widespread interest in the sabbath. Bates, White, Harmon, Edson, Wheeler, and S. W. Rhodes led the promotion of the sabbath, partly through regular publications. Present Truth magazine was largely devoted to the sabbath at first.

In 1851, Adventists taught that the sabbath begins at 6PM Friday, and not at sunset, nor midnight, nor sunrise:

It is clear, therefore, from Scripture testimony that every day commences at 6 o’clock, and not at sunset, nor at midnight, as many contend, nor yet at sunrise as some others believe. Therefore the Sabbath commences at 6 P. M. on what is called Friday. Every hour and minute of it is sanctified time, “holy to the Lord, and holy to those who keep it. (ARSH April 21, 1851, p71.7)

The Adventists held a conference at Battle Creek, Mich., Nov. 16, 1855. At this conference, they voted to accept J.N. Andrews's decision that the Sabbath begins at sunset:

A division among them was arising over this question. So Elder J. N. Andrews, the best scholar they then had, was requested to study the subject and present his conclusion to the conference held at Battle Creek, Mich., Nov. 16, 1855. This he did, and decided that sunset was the Scriptural time to begin the Sabbath. The conference voted to accept his view.... “Then, four days after Andrews and the conference had settled it, Mrs. White had a vision in which an angel told her that sunset was the right time!!! ... In that vision she complained to the angel and asked for an explanation. She says: ‘I inquired why it had been thus, that at this late day we must change the time of commencing the Sabbath. Said the angel, “Ye shall understand, but not yet, not yet.”’ (‘Test.,’ Vol. I., p. 116).

Ever since that conference, the Adventists have been teaching that the Sabbath is from sunset Friday to sunset Saturday.

Adventists have forever settled the matter of when the Sabbath begins, by voting at the 1855 conference to change the Sabbath from starting at 6PM Friday to starting at sunset Friday. The "sunset Friday to sunset Saturday" sabbath was confirmed by Ellen White having a vision in which an angel told her, "From even unto even, shall ye celebrate your sabbath."

The vision set Ellen White and Joseph Bates straight, and they accepted the vision wholeheartedly. The matter of the time to commence the Sabbath was forever settled—settled on the basis of Bible study, confirmed by vision. It was indeed a significant experience in God's leadings (1 BIO 324.8)

J. N. Andrews was the first Adventist to write a book-length defense of the sabbath, first published in 1861. Two of Andrews' books include Testimony of the Fathers of the First Three Centuries Concerning the Sabbath and the First Day and History of the Sabbath.

===== Eschatology =====
The pioneers of the church have traditionally taught that the seventh-day sabbath will be a test, leading to the sealing of God's people during the end times, though there is little consensus about how this will play out. The church has clearly taught that there will be an international Sunday law enforced by a coalition of religious and secular authorities, and that all who do not observe it will be persecuted, imprisoned or martyred. This is taken from the church's interpretation, following Ellen G. White, of Daniel 7:25, Revelation 13:15, Revelation 7, Ezekiel 20:12–20, and Exodus 31:13. Where the subject of persecution appeared in prophecy, it was thought to be about the sabbath. Some early Adventists were jailed for working on Sunday, in violation of various local blue laws that legislated Sunday as a day of rest.

==== Seventh Day Adventist Reformers ====
Seventh Day Adventist Reform Movement, formed as the result of a schism within the Seventh-day Adventist Church in Europe during World War I over the position its European church leaders took on Sabbath observance and in committing Seventh-day Adventist Church members to the bearing of arms in military service for Germany in the war.

==== Davidian Seventh-day Adventists ====
The General Association of Davidian Seventh-day Adventists (Davidians) or the Shepherd's Rod is an American offshoot of the Seventh-day Adventist Church, headquartered at the Mount Carmel Center near Waco, Texas. It was founded in 1929 by Victor Houteff, its President and Prophet.

==== Church of God (Seventh-Day) ====
The Churches of God (Seventh-Day) movement is composed of a number of sabbath-keeping churches and represents a line of Sabbatarian Adventists that rejected the visions and teachings of Ellen G. White before the formation of the Seventh-day Adventist Church in 1863. Among which the General Conference of the Church of God (7th Day), or simply CoG7, headquartered in Salem, West Virginia, is the best-known organization.

=== Armstrongism ===
Seventh-day Sabbatarianism was a key feature of the former Worldwide Church of God, founded by Herbert W. Armstrong, and its various descendant movements. Armstrong, who began the Radio Church of God, was in 1931 ordained by the Oregon Conference of the Church of God (Seventh Day), an Adventist group, and began serving a congregation in Eugene, Oregon. The broadcast was essentially a condensed church service on the air, with hymn singing featured along with Armstrong's message, and was the launching point for what would become the Worldwide Church of God.

=== Sabbatarian Pentecostals ===
Some Pentecostal churches also observe Sabbath on Saturdays.

The Nazareth Baptist Church is the second largest African initiated church based in South Africa, founded in 1910.

The True Jesus Church, established in Beijing, China, in 1917, supports the seventh-day sabbath, and it has approximately two million members worldwide. Early church worker Ling-Sheng Zhang adopted the seventh-day sabbath after studying Seventh-day Adventist theology, and co-worker Paul Wei was originally a Seventh-day Adventist. An American missionary named Berntsen, who was from a sabbath-keeping Church of God, was also influential among the church workers.

The Soldiers of the Cross Church (officially — Evangelical International Church of the Soldiers of the Cross of Christ) is organized in the early 1920s by an American businessman named Ernest William Sellers in Havana, Cuba.

The Evangelical Christians-Sabbatarians baptized by the Holy Spirit is a Western Ukraine-origin Oneness denomination, established in 1920s and 1930s.

The Church of God at Jerusalem Acres is U.S.-origin body, founded in 1957 and headquartered in Cleveland, Tennessee.

The 7th Day Pentecostal Assemblies is an international church, first registered in Ghana in 1970.

The Seventh day Apostolic Church, also known as Seventh day Pentecostals, is a religious sect of Pentecostalism that keeps the old testament laws. It appeared in Valea Florilor, Romania, and its leader used to be Ioan Boeru.

=== Other groups ===
Other minor Sabbatarian churches and movements include:

- Adventist Church of Promise
- Assembly of Yahweh 7th Day, formed in Holt, Michigan
- Assemblies of Yahweh, headquartered in Bethel, Pennsylvania
- Creation Seventh Day Adventist Church
- Hebrew Roots
- House of Yahweh 7th Day, headquartered in Clyde, Texas
- La Iglesia de Dios, Incorporada, a Pentecostal church established in Puerto Rico in 1939, they hold to the observance of the biblical sabbath day, they also have a distinct doctrine that sets them apart from mainstream pentecostalism, the women in this church use a veil during religious services, for prayer or prophesying.
- Jemaat Allah Global Indonesia (JAGI), internationally known as Unitarian Christian Church of Indonesia (UCCI), headquartered in Semarang, Central Java, Indonesia, is Unitarian church with observing some Law of Moses practices, such as dietary laws and seventh-day Sabbath
- Logos Apostolic Church of God, in the UK, Kenya, Uganda, Tanzania, and Sudan
- Messianic Judaism, some Messianic Jews observe Shabbat on Saturdays
- Remnant Fellowship, headquartered in Brentwood, Tennessee and founded in 1999 by Gwen Shamblin Lara
- Sabbath Rest Advent Church
- The Seventh-day Remnant Church
- Subbotniks, branches of Spiritual Christians in and from Russia, the majority belonged to Rabbinic and Karaite Judaism, the minority to Christianity
- Yehowists, a Russian Spiritual Christian millenarian movement founded in the 1840s
- Founded in Truth Fellowship, a non-denominational church located in Rock Hill, SC meets on Saturday and recognizes it as the Biblical Sabbath day.

== See also ==
- International Date Line as affecting calculations of series of days for travelers and resident Sabbath-keepers
- Christian views on the Old Covenant
- List of Seventh-day Sabbath-keeping churches
- Messianic Judaism
- Restorationism
- Sabbath in Christianity
- Sabbath Rest Advent Church
- Sherbert v. Verner

== Notes ==
1. Canon of Holy Saturday, Kontakion: "Exceeding blessed is this Sabbath, on which Christ has slumbered, to rise on the third day."
2. The seventh of the Thirty-Nine Articles of the Church of England states, "Although the law given from God by Moses, as touching ceremonies and rites, do not bind Christian men, nor the civil precepts thereof ought of necessity to be received in any commonwealth; yet, notwithstanding, no Christian man whatsoever is free from the obedience of the commandments which are called moral."
