= United Church of God =

Non-denominational Christian church based in the United States

United Church of God, an International Association
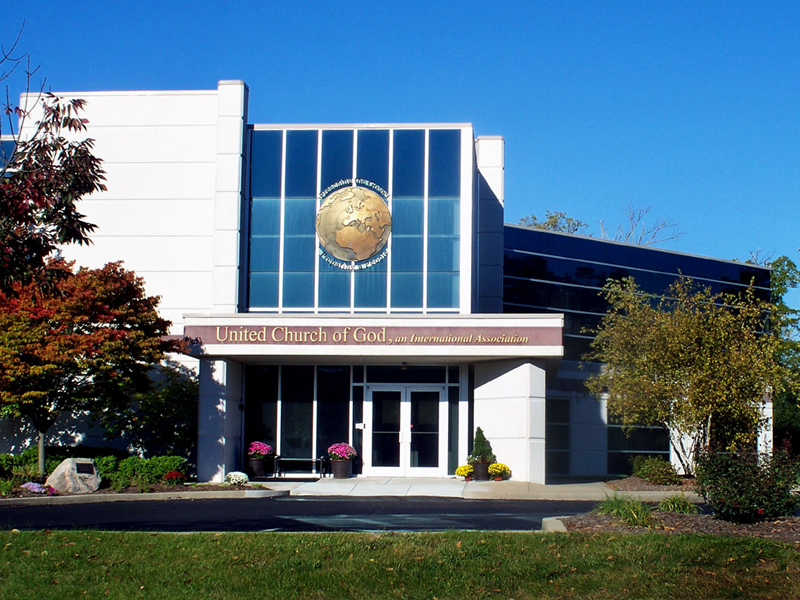
- United Church of God Headquarters Building
- Classification: Church of God
- President: John Elliott (May 2025 – present)
- Council Chairman: Tim Pebworth (May 2024 – present)
- Region: International
- Headquarters: Milford, Ohio
- Origin: 1995; Indianapolis, Indiana
- Separations: Church of God, an International Community; Church of God, a Worldwide Association
- Congregations: ~395
- Members: ~15,000+

The United Church of God, an International Association (UCGIA or simply UCG) is an American-based restorationist and nontrinitarian Christian (Armstrongite) international religious organization formed in 1995 following a schism within the Worldwide Church of God (now Grace Communion International).

The UCG identifies as "The United Church of God, an International Association", with the last three words italicized in order to differentiate the UCG from local congregations and denominations which bear similar names. The UCG was organized in 1995 by a group of churches that had been part of the Worldwide Church of God which rejected instuitional and doctrinal reforms in the years following that church's founder Herbert W. Armstrong's death in 1986. The UCG holds doctrines and beliefs similar to those taught by Armstrong, which include strict Sabbatarianism, British Israelism, Binitarianism, and restorationism, collectively known as Armstrongism.

== Government ==
The UCG is governed by a 12-man board called the "Council of Elders" that is elected by the church's paid and lay ministers, which form the "General Conference of Elders." The General Conference of Elders meets once a year in May to perform tasks including budget approval, operational planning, strategic planning, electing members of the church council, and participation in seminars. The council acts as the governing body for the international association and is responsible for forming policy and doctrine for the Church. The council meets four times a year.

The UCG's international headquarters is referred to as the "Home Office" and is located in Milford, Ohio (a suburb of Cincinnati). This office is headed by the UCG's president, who is the church's official spokesperson and is charged with administrative responsibility over day-to-day functions, such as managing the church's paid ministry and producing literature or other publications. The president is appointed by the Council of Elders (COE) and can be removed from his appointment by the COE. The COE must remain in the confidence of the General Conference of Elders, and COE members serve on a rotating system of election wherein four of twelve men are up for re-election or replacement in any given year.

== Fundamental beliefs ==
The UCG follows and believes in many of the basic doctrinal principles of Christian churches, such as the inspiration of the scriptures, Christ's bodily resurrection, and the three ordinances of baptism, and agrees with Protestant theology regarding the tenets of sola scriptura and that justification is a gift given freely by God. However, its teachings differ from mainstream Christian (Catholic, Orthodox and Protestant) theology in a number of key areas:

- Nature of God — There are two distinct, uncreated, and eternal divine Beings presiding over the creation: God the Father and the Word, who became flesh as Jesus Christ. They are considered "one" in belief, direction, and purpose, much the same way members of the Church are united while remaining separate physical beings. Jesus is both God and the Son of God, and is the Creator of all things through the direction of the Father. Together they make up "the God family." The Holy Spirit is the transforming power of God rather than a person.
- The Bible — Both the Old and New Testaments preserve God's divine revelation to humanity and are his "complete expressed will to humanity." In agreement with 2 Timothy 3:16, all scripture is inspired by God. The UCG also holds that scripture is infallible in its original writing and the final authority in a person's life. There is no doctrine regarding the type of translation one must use.
- Satan the Devil — Satan is the ultimate adversary of God and, by extension, man. He is the deceiver and accuser of man who has temporarily been given limited power over the world by God.
- Humanity — Humans are created in the image of God with the potential to be children in God's family. Mankind was formed from the dust of the ground and given the breath of life by God. Humans are mortal, and do not possess an immortal soul.
- Sin and God's Law — Sin is defined as transgression of God's law. Sin, introduced to humanity in the garden of Eden, withholds God's gift of eternal life from mankind. Only through the forgiveness of sins, by God's grace, will a person receive eternal life. However, despite God's grace, open rejection of God's law and a return to sinful ways will ultimately lead to death.
- The Sacrifice of Jesus Christ — The sacrifice of Jesus Christ is the foundation of Christianity. Jesus gave His life for all mankind so that we might live, freed from the penalty of sin.
- Three Days and Three Nights — In accordance with his prophecy concerning himself, Christ would be raised after three days and three nights, literally. The UCG holds that Christ died on Wednesday afternoon and was raised shortly before sunset on Saturday.
- Repentance — Repentance is a major part of conversion and is necessary for true conversion into God's family.
- Water Baptism — The United Church of God holds baptism as an important ordinance for all Christians. Complete immersion is the only form of water baptism accepted by the UCG. Baptism must be preceded by faith and repentance and represents a believer's death and newness of life in Christ Jesus. Baptism is considered an outward expression of an inward conversion. Infant baptism is strongly discouraged, as only those who fully understand and appreciate what baptism symbolizes are baptized. The baptism ceremony is followed by the “laying on of hands” where a believer is believed to receive the Holy Spirit.
- The Sabbath Day — The Sabbath day, as a day set aside by God, was established at creation, given to Israel in the Ten Commandments, and made for all mankind. Members hallow the Sabbath by worshipping and resting on the Seventh day.
- Passover — members of the UCG observe the Passover meal every 14th of Abib, imitating Christ's last supper. The Passover meal, the bread and the wine, are viewed as a reminder of Christ's sacrifice. The Passover ceremony, which consists of the bread, the wine, and foot washing, is observed once a year.
- Belief concerning the Festivals and Holy Days of God — The UCG observes seven annual Festivals and seven annual Holy Days (annual Sabbaths): Passover, Feast of Unleavened Bread, Feast of Pentecost, Feast of Trumpets, Day of Atonement, Feast of Tabernacles, and The Last Great Day.
- Food Laws — According to the teaching of the UCG, God's food laws were established before the formation of Israel and are therefore still binding to Christians today. Evidence of their continuing importance is believed to be found in the example of Jesus' and His disciples' abstinence of biblically unclean meats.
- Military Service and War — The UCG holds that Christians are forbidden by the commandments of God from taking a life. Christians are viewed as being called out of this world, having their citizenship in heaven, and discouraged from participating too closely in worldly affairs. John 18:36 is often used to defend this position, "Jesus stated, 'My kingdom is not of this world. If My kingdom were of this world, then My servants fight.'" Also, because most militaries require you to sign away certain rights, The UCG strongly dissuades members from enlisting and voluntarily giving away their freedom to serve God to the best of their ability.
- Promises to Abraham — The UCG holds that people of Western European descent, primarily the original British colonies and the United States, are direct physical descendants of the Ten Lost Tribes of the northern kingdom of ancient Israel, whereas the historical Jews (and modern-day Israel) are descendants of the ancient southern kingdom of Judah. This belief is not used to assert racial or ethnic superiority, but solely to interpret End Time prophecies which are believed to be directed at the United States and Europe.
- God’s Purpose for Mankind — The purpose of mankind is to prepare us to become part of God’s family. The UCG holds that Christians are ultimately begotten as children in the Family of God and will at their resurrection become "spirit-born divine beings who are part of Elohim, the universe-ruling family of God (see Divinization (Christian))."
- The Church — The church is defined as the body of believers that have received, and are being guided by, the Holy Spirit. The UCG stresses the importance of the name Church of God and identifier of God's true church.
- Tithing — In accordance with Old Testament writings, the UCG encourages members to tithe, which in Greek and Hebrew meant “to give or take the tenth of all increase” (not necessarily a tenth of total income). Members are also taught to set aside a second tithe, an additional 10 percent for their own personal use in observing the church's annual religious festivals, particularly the Feast of Tabernacles.
- Resurrections — At Christ's return, those who have lived in Christ will be resurrected to spiritual life. Those who do not know or understand the truth of the Bible during their lifetimes will be given time to learn these teachings after the "Second Resurrection" to a new physical life. After living again in the Millennial world under God's Kingdom, those who continue to reject God's Holy Spirit and way of life will be annihilated after the "Third Resurrection" along with unrepentant former believers who had turned away from God. They are destroyed in the third resurrection (the "resurrection of fire") in the Lake of Fire, along with Satan and his demons.
- Jesus Christ's Return — The UCG teaches a “personal, visible, premillennial return of the Lord Jesus Christ.” They believe Jesus taught the coming of a literal earthly Kingdom and that people who are 'saved' will not immediately go to heaven upon dying, but will be raised on the last day and live and rule eternally with Jesus Christ on earth after his second coming. The UCG also asserts that the final destination of the unrepentant wicked is not everlasting torture, but annihilation or permanent destruction.

== Other doctrines ==
- Alcohol consumption in moderation is permitted but the UCG teaches against the misuse of alcohol.
- Belief in Restorationism. Like many churches in the Restorationist movement, the UCG believes that a number of today's mainstream Christian teachings resulted from doctrinal corruption under the influence of Greco-Roman philosophy, Gnosticism, Anti-Semitism, and mistranslation which occurred early in the history of the church. Much of UCG doctrine that is distinct from mainstream Christianity is the outgrowth of an effort to separate these influences and traditions from what is believed to be the beliefs and practices of Jesus Christ and the original Apostolic church. The UCG holds that the Roman Catholic church and most Protestant denominations today have mistakenly syncretized various pagan doctrines and practices. For example, the UCG teaches that the ancient pagan origins of traditional Christian celebrations (especially Christmas, Valentine's Day, Easter, and Halloween) render them inappropriate for true Christians.

== Ambassador Bible College ==
Ambassador Bible College (ABC), located in Milford, Ohio, is an intensive nine-month educational program focusing on the Bible, Christian living and the fundamental doctrines of the United Church of God. The program seeks to prepare young adults for leadership and service, and to begin preparing them for the duty of teaching future generations. The curriculum thoroughly examines doctrine and leads students systematically through the books of the Bible.

== Mission and media ==
The UCG publishes and produces the following:

- Beyond Today magazine (formerly The Good News) is the UCG's flagship publication. It is a free magazine and is published bi-monthly. The magazine contains articles that discuss Bible prophecy, world news and trends, social issues, church doctrine and Christian living.
- The Beyond Today Television Program airs on WGN America and the WORD Network and is shown on a further 28 Public-access television cable TV stations and is accompanied by a multimedia website and a presence on YouTube and a dedicated Roku channel.
- Compass Check (formerly Vertical Thought) is a quarterly publication published for youth. The publication contains articles from both church ministers and youth, and aims to strengthen the Christian faith of its readership.
- The United News is a newsletter which focuses on news and events within the United Church of God. The newsletter contains articles on the UCG missions, church activities, reports on church governance, doctrinal and Christian living articles, and birth and death announcements of church members.

In addition to the above publications, the UCG has produced 53 booklets on various biblical topics, a 12-lesson Bible study course, a monthly systematic Bible reading program with commentary, various article reprints, local public-access television programs, and a website. A series of presentations called the Kingdom of God Bible seminars began in September 2011 and are held at different locations around the world.

== See also ==
- Christian observances of Jewish holidays
- Christian views on the Old Covenant
- Restorationism
