= Evangelists of the Worldwide Church of God =

Historically speaking, in the former Worldwide Church of God an "evangelist" was a high ranking minister under governance of the Pastor General (also acknowledged to be an "apostle"), Herbert W. Armstrong from 1934 to 1986, then under Joseph W. Tkach, from 1986 until his death in 1995. Higher ranking positions (to that of "evangelist") being; "apostle" (first) and then "prophet" (second) as stated in Ephesians 4:11. In the WCG, which was later renamed and is today known as Grace Communion International, the biblical term "evangelist" is no longer used as a ministerial title, although certain denominations with roots in the former WCG organization, such as the Living Church of God and the Philadelphia Church of God, still use the term.

With the exception of those ordained to the ministerial rank of evangelist while in the employ of the Worldwide Church of God, those who were once members of the WCG but were ordained as evangelists while members of WCG derivative denominations are not included.

Below is a list of ministers ordained to the rank of evangelist in the Worldwide Church of God between 1952 and 1990.

- Colin Adair (1944–1998): Leader of the WCG in the Philippines and Canada. Was a minister of the Global Church of God at the time of his death in 1998, just prior to that organization splitting.
- David Albert (19??-present): Ordained by Joseph W. Tkach in 1988; co-host of The World Tomorrow from 1986 to 1994; Author of Difficult Scriptures; Professor of psychology for many years at Ambassador University. Current affiliation is not known.
- Greg Albrecht (1947–present): Ordained by Joseph W. Tkach during the 1988 Feast of Unleavened Bread, now operates Plain Truth Ministries and publishes The Plain Truth. Author of Bad News Religion.
- Richard Ames (1936–2024): Former Registrar of Ambassador University; Co-host of The World Tomorrow, 1986–1994; resided in Charlotte, NC until 2024; he co-hosted Tomorrow's World for the Living Church of God.
- David Antion: Left the employ of the WCG in 1979 and affiliated with the Church of God, International for a few years. Now founder of Guardian Ministries and leader of the Church of God Southern California based in Pasadena. In addition to his ministries, he is a practicing licensed psychologist and marriage counselor.
- Dibar Krikor Apartian (1916–2010): Before being hired at Ambassador College in Pasadena in 1955 as a professor of French, during World War II he worked for the United States Embassy in Bern, Switzerland. Because of his intelligence, diplomacy, and graciousness, he became the highest-ranking non-Swiss employee of that Embassy. In the WCG, for years he worked as head over the French outreach program/work and his radio program "Le Monde a Venir" broadcast across Europe for twenty years until March 1981. In 1995, due to doctrinal changes, he left the WCG and became affiliated with the Global Church of God till late 1998, when that organization split. Thereafter, was with the Living Church of God.
- Garner Ted Armstrong (1930–2003): Ordained in 1955; Ambassador student body president, 1955–1956; Ambassador Class of 1956; President of Ambassador University, 1975–1978; Primary host of The World Tomorrow from the 1950s until 1978; Authored The Real Jesus in 1977; Following his dismissal from the Worldwide Church of God, he founded the Church of God International, 1978; Founded the Intercontinental Church of God, 1998; Died due to complications from pneumonia in Tyler, Texas, 2003; Buried near the Big Sandy campus of Ambassador University in Gladewater, Texas.
- Richard D. Armstrong (1929–1958): Ambassador student body president, 1951–1952; Ambassador Class of 1952; ordained by his father, Herbert W. Armstrong on December 20, 1952; Died as the result of injuries sustained in an automobile crash near San Luis Obispo in 1958; buried in the family plot at Mountain View Cemetery in Altadena, California.
- C. Stanley Bass (1944–1998): Second and last African-American to be ordained as an evangelist; from 1990, was on the English faculty at Ambassador University in Big Sandy. As he had graduated from Paul Quinn College many years earlier, he was finally awarded a degree from Ambassador in 1997 at the institution's final spring commencement.
- Dean Blackwell (1931–2003): Beginning in 1953, was the first pastor of the WCG congregation in Big Sandy, Texas; Ordained Evangelist, 1964; Long-time pastor in the Chicago area, later a favorite professor of theology at Ambassador University; Retired by the WCG, 1996; Remained with the Worldwide Church of God until his death, though retired at the time and working part-time at Dillard's department store in Longview, Texas.
- Carn Catherwood (19??-present): Ambassador Class of 1961; Leader of the Italian outreach of the WCG beginning in the early 1980s. Remains affiliated with the WCG.
- C. Wayne Cole (1930–2022): Ambassador Class of 1954; disfellowshipped in 1979 during the receivership crisis; affiliated with both the Church of God, International and the United Church of God. He lived in Tyler, Texas, he served as a fraternal delegate to the 2007 convention of the Church of God (Seventh Day), in which his own family has roots.
- Raymond C. Cole (1926–2001): Ambassador Class of 1952; ordained by Herbert W. Armstrong on December 20, 1952. Founded the Church of God, the Eternal, 1974–1975. As one of the original six students at Ambassador, he was a roommate of Herman L. Hoeh. Unlike many Ambassador students, he grew up in the Church of God (Seventh Day). His break from the WCG in 1974 was largely due to doctrinal changes regarding Pentecost and divorce and remarriage. He believed God had revealed those core doctrines through Mr. Armstrong, and being God's — not man's — they were inviolable.
- Ronald Lee Dart (1934–2016): Designated to serve as Ambassador University president in 1978; active ministerial partner of Garner Ted Armstrong, 1978–1995; founded Christian Educational Ministries in Whitehouse, Texas in 1995.
- Robert Fahey (1940–2015): Ambassador Class of 1965; ordained 1981; now affiliated with the United Church of God. Served as pastor of the Chicago UCG. Died Sept. 28, 2015.
- J. Michael Feazell (June 1951 – present): Ordained to the rank of evangelist by Joseph W. Tkach in the fall of 1990, just prior to the Feast of Tabernacles; authored The Liberation of the Worldwide Church of God in 2001; remains affiliated with the Worldwide Church of God.
- David Jon Hill (1930–2003): Ambassador Class of 1955; authored How to Study the Bible and Read the Book; Contributed to Twentieth-Century Watch in the 1980s. Brother-in-law of church hymn writer Dwight L. Armstrong.
- Herman L. Hoeh (1928–2004): Ambassador Class of 1951; ordained by Herbert W. Armstrong on December 20, 1952; buried in Altadena, California. Noted church historian, his two doctoral dissertations laid the foundation for views on world history held by many in the church. Retired by the WCG, 1996; served on Ambassador University board until its closure in 1997; served on church board until his death.
- David Hulme (1946-): served as a minister in the UK, South Africa, Canada and the US before being ordained as evangelist by Joseph W. Tkach in 1986; co-host of The World Tomorrow from 1986 to 1994; disfellowshipped by Joseph W. Tkach in 1995 due to disagreements over far-reaching doctrinal changes; helped found the United Church of God and later the Church of God, an International Community; prolific author; currently publishes Vision magazine.
- Charles Freeman Hunting (1919–2011): Ambassador Class of 1961; disfellowshipped, c. 1974.
- Harold Jackson (1911–1991): First African-American to be ordained as a deacon, elder, and later evangelist. The Harold L. Jackson Hall of Humanities on the Big Sandy, Texas campus of Ambassador was named in his memory. Worked with African-American members of the church during the 1960s. Listed as "doctrinal advisor" in 1988 ministerial directory. Buried in Altadena, California.
- Ronald D. Kelly (1938-): Ordained in 1976; co-host of The World Tomorrow from 1988 until 1994. Now retired from the Worldwide Church of God.
- Ellis LaRavia (1931–2020): Vice-president, Ambassador International Cultural Foundation; ordained evangelist in Tucson, 1979. Now affiliated with the United Church of God, an International Association.
- Dennis Luker (1937–2013): Pastor, Garden Grove, CA WCG, mid-1980s; UCG Council of Elders, 1995–2001; pastor, Seattle UCG, c. 2005; regional pastor, Northwest States, UCG, c. 2005; UCG president, c. 2010. Deceased Feb. 2013.
- Herbert Burk McNair (1931–2017): One-time pastor of the WCG congregation in Big Sandy, Texas; was later with the United Church of God, an International Association.
- ‘’’Marion J. McNair’’’ was ordained with his brother Raymond in 1953.
- Raymond F. McNair (1930–2008): Ambassador Class of 1953. Summer 1949, assigned on the "first student-led, nationwide baptismal tour with Raymond Cole. Ordained 1953 by Herbert W. Armstrong and went to pastor the St. Louis Church, shortly afterward establishing the Chicago congregation in 1955. 1958-1973 took charge of the Worldwide Church of God's work in Britain. Appointed by Armstrong Deputy Chancellor of Ambassador College (Bricket Wood, UK) 1960-1973. Served on the Headquarters Doctrinal Team 1974. Appointed Deputy Chancellor over Ambassador College (Pasadena, USA) 1978, during time Armstrong was trying to get the WCG 'back-on-track'. Worked in that appointment until 1988 when, during that year, Joseph Tkach Sr sent him to serve as Regional Head in "New Zealand, Fiji, Tonga, etc". Due to major doctrinal changes, he left the WCG and attended the Global Church of God, then after that organization split, was with the Church of God, a Christian Fellowship; thereafter the Living Church of God. He then became founder and president of the Church of God 21st Century. Authored book Ascent to Greatness.
- Leslie McCullough (1929–2019): Ambassador Class of 1961; twice served as deputy chancellor of Ambassador University in Big Sandy; later affiliated with the Church of God, a Worldwide Association.
- C. Paul Meredith (1902–1968): Ordained by Herbert W. Armstrong on December 20, 1952. Editor of the original Bible Correspondence Course; uncle of Roderick C. Meredith.
- Roderick C. Meredith (1930–2017): Ambassador Class of 1952; ordained by Herbert W. Armstrong 1952; worked in many different capacities including Director of Church Administration and pastor over several churches. He was disfellowshipped by Joseph W. Tkach and Joseph Tkach Jr. following heated exchange in December 1992. He then founded the Global Church of God and, after that organization dramatically and controversially split in 1998, founded the Living Church of God, over which he presided until his death.
- L. Leroy Neff (1923–2014): Ambassador Class of 1959; long-time treasurer in the WCG.
- Al Portune: Disfellowshipped c. 1974.
- Stanley R. Rader (1930–2002): Baptized in a Hong Kong hotel bathtub in 1975 and ordained by Herbert W. Armstrong in Tucson, Arizona, in 1979; author of Against the Gates of Hell and unpublished Law and Liberty; died in 2002; buried in Altadena, California. Although he faded from public view after 1981, he remained a member of the church. His funeral was presided over by Joseph W. Tkach Jr.
- Richard Rice (1935–2003): Director, Mail Processing Center.
- Larry Salyer: For a while associated with Roderick C. Meredith and the Global Church of God; then with 'the United Church of God, an International Association'; now with 'the Church of God, a Worldwide Association'.
- Bernard W. Schnippert (1949–2014): Ordained by Joseph W. Tkach in the fall of 1990, just prior to the Feast of Tabernacles. At one time was an assistant to Stanley R. Rader; Was affiliated with Grace Communion International.
- Norman A. Smith:(1930–2021) Ambassador Class of 1954; ordained evangelist in 1957. Retired 1996. Died April 26, 2021
- ‘’’Kyriacos J. Stavranides’’’ (1934–2024) was ordained as an evangelist in 1990. He served as a philosophy professor at Ambassador College and later at Azusa Pacific University. He went on to become an orthodox priest.
- Joseph W. Tkach Sr. (1927–1995): Ordained as an elder by Dr. Roderick C. Meredith in 1963, and as an evangelist by Herbert W. Armstrong in 1979; elevated to the office of Pastor General in 1986; is buried in Altadena, California.
- Joseph Tkach Jr. (1951–present): Ordained by Joseph W. Tkach Sr. in the fall of 1990, just prior to the Feast of Tabernacles; elevated to the office of Pastor General in 1995; Author of Transformed by Truth). Received a doctorate in ministry from Azusa Pacific University.
- Leon Walker: Long-time director of Spanish work, later with United Church of God. Resident of Big Sandy, Texas.
- Donald L. Ward (1939–present): Ordained by Joseph W. Tkach in 1988; president of Ambassador University from 1987 to 1995 (his original appointment as president in 1978 was overruled by Herbert W. Armstrong); disfellowshipped in 1995; affiliated with 'the United Church of God, an International Association' 1995–present. Pastor, Houston-South congregation.
- Gerald Waterhouse (1927–2002): Ambassador Class of 1956; disfellowshipped, 1995; affiliated with the United Church of God, 1995–2002; buried in Florence, South Carolina. Known for sermons stressing the importance of remaining loyal to God's leaders. When doctrines changed in the WCG, Waterhouse changed affiliations as well to stay loyal to what he believed was right.
- Kenneth Westby (1939?-2016): Disfellowshipped 1974; founded Associated Churches of God (now known as Association for Christian Development).
- Dean Wilson (deceased): Ambassador Class of 1962; leader of the WCG in Canada; later affiliated with 'the United Church of God, an International Association'.
- Clint Zimmerman (?-2012): Chiropractor. Ordained by Joseph W. Tkach in the fall of 1990 just prior to the Feast of Tabernacles.
