= Stanley Rader =

Attorney and evangelist in United States

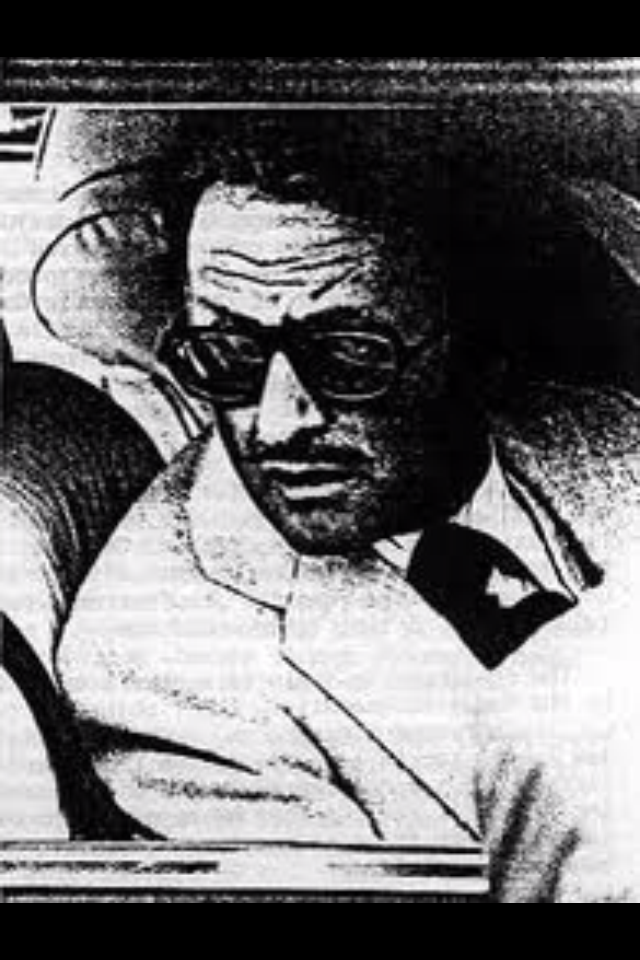
- Stanley Rader, circa 1980

Stanley R. Rader (August 13, 1930 – July 2, 2002), was an attorney, accountant, author and, later in life, one of the Evangelists of the Worldwide Church of God, then a Sabbatarian organization, which was founded by Herbert W. Armstrong.

== Before meeting Armstrong ==
Stanley Rader was born and raised in White Plains, New York. He later moved to California, where he met his future wife, Natalie "Niki" Gartenberg. He graduated from UCLA in 1951 and became a Certified Public Accountant in 1954.

== First associations with Armstrong ==
In 1956 Rader met Armstrong, leader of what was then called the Radio Church of God, at its headquarters offices in Pasadena, California. Under contract with the Radio Church of God, Rader worked on improving its accounting system, thereby creating a highly favorable impression with Armstrong, who then urged him to attend law school at Armstrong's expense. In 1963 Rader graduated from University of Southern California Law School.

The Radio Church of God had been previously incorporated on March 3, 1946, when it was re-established in Pasadena. Prior to this event it had been an unincorporated voluntary association based in Eugene, Oregon, and named after its radio broadcast. On January 5, 1968, Armstrong, as president, together with the secretary of the corporation, amended its Articles of Incorporation to reflect the change of name to the Worldwide Church of God. (By then its radio broadcast had also been renamed The World Tomorrow). By this time Armstrong was considered to be more of a modern-day apostle by his followers, rather than merely "pastor general," his title in the church. After coming to terms regarding salary and compensation, in 1969 Rader chose to devote himself full-time to the service of Armstrong.

== Joining WCG ==
Rader, who still considered himself Jewish, was baptized into WCG by Armstrong in 1975 using a hotel bathtub in the Mandarin Hotel in Hong Kong. This move allowed Rader to reposition himself as a high-ranking church evangelist in an attempt to quell misgivings by many in the ministerial hierarchy, who felt that Rader's undue influence on Armstrong was troubling.

== 60 Minutes interview ==
In a 60 Minutes interview with Mike Wallace, Rader defended himself, remarking to Wallace, "I don't take stupid pills." Wallace read to Rader a portion of a letter Armstrong was drafting, asking Rader to resign from any church positions that would make him Armstrong's successor. Wallace then played a tape of Armstrong reading the letter. Rader started to sweat, before finally declaring: "Now I say you've acquired this by illegal means. I intend to have my attorneys today not only sue you if you use this. ... Mike, look, I think you'd better scrap everything because you're on my list. Okay? You're never going to live it down, Mike, I guarantee it. ... you're contemptible. ... I'd like you to get out of here, immediately!" Rader then stormed out of the room, and accused the press of distorting the facts.

== Popularizing Armstrong ==
Whereas the plan of Garner Ted Armstrong was to ease his aging father into retirement, the plan of Rader and his aide Robert Kuhn was to transform Herbert W. Armstrong from an elderly evangelist into a more secular leader, casting him as a vital "Ambassador for World Peace without portfolio". Rader's plan required the creation of a totally new and secular cover entity from which to operate, distanced from Armstrong's Worldwide fundamentalist sect, which might prove unpalatable to prominent world leaders as Armstrong played out his role as quasi-ambassador. In 1975, therefore, he incorporated the Ambassador International Cultural Foundation (AICF) which was actually funded from the tithe money of members of the Worldwide Church of God. In 1979, Rader was ordained as one of the Evangelists of the Worldwide Church of God.

As a consequence, the AICF transformed Ambassador Auditorium, on the Ambassador College campus, from a church auditorium, in which Saturday Sabbath church services were conducted, into a "Carnegie Hall of the West", and launched a concert series featuring the top names in classical music, jazz, and the performing arts. PBS and other television networks made use of this new venue. The AICF also created a new, glossy, secular, coffee-table, commercial magazine called Quest, with a circulation of several hundred thousand copies. Additionally, the AICF bought the book publisher Everest House, and funded the motion picture Paper Moon starring Tatum O'Neal.

Armstrong, in the company of Rader, began introducing himself to any world leader who held political power and was willing to meet with the aging, grandfatherly figure for a photo opportunity for The Plain Truth, during which the leader would receive expensive gifts, such as Stueben crystal. Armstrong sold his new AICF portfolio approach to the church membership as being a new phase in preaching the church's gospel.

== Business relationships ==
Rader used his own professional legal accounting practice, and also incorporated new companies in order to conduct profitable business enterprises on behalf of the Worldwide Church of God. The companies largely owned and controlled by Rader included:

- Rader, Helge & Gerson, which provided legal representation for the church.
- Rader, Cornwall, Kessler and Palazzo, which provided accounting services for the church.
- Worldwide Advertising, Inc., which booked The World Tomorrow on radio and television stations.
- Mid-Atlantic Leasing, which leased light aircraft and a Gulfstream II, to enable Rader and Armstrong to fly around the world meeting kings, princes, presidents, and prime ministers, all paid for by the Worldwide Church of God.
- Wilshire Travel, which made the travel bookings for Rader and Armstrong.
- Gateway Publishing, which printed books used by the church.

== WCG placed in receivership ==
By 1979, California Attorney General George Deukmejian had opened an investigation into allegations that millions of dollars a year had been stolen from the church by Armstrong and Rader. These allegations resulted in WCG being placed in court-ordered receivership for more than a year.

During this time, Rader was the point man for Armstrong, and rallied other religious groups to his defense. With the backing of a nonprofit, religious lobbying coalition formed to thwart state intrusion, Rader successfully introduced a bill into the California Legislature which restricted the Attorney General's authority to conduct civil (but not criminal) financial investigations of California religious and nonprofit organizations. Subsequent to the bill's passage into law, the California Attorney General's office dropped its litigation against WCG.

== Book ==
In 1980, Rader wrote a book called Against the Gates of Hell: The Threat to Religious Freedom in America, which was published by the Worldwide Church of God's Everest House corporation. It was about the investigation by the State of California into the finances of the church. The National Council of Churches praised it as "the seminal work on church/state relations in the 20th century."

== Resignation ==
Although Rader appeared to have won the financial receivership battle, his plan to create the AICF cultural empire had come to a halt. In 1981 he resigned as General Counsel and Treasurer of the Worldwide Church of God. Armstrong paid Rader a special $250,000 bonus, after taxes, in appreciation of his vigorous defense of the church against the state receivership. Rader also received substantial pension payments arising under his contractual agreement with the church.

== Death ==
By the time that Rader died on July 2, 2002, just two weeks after being diagnosed with acute pancreatic cancer, the Worldwide Church of God had terminated its former broadcasts and created a separate ministry for its magazine, which had renounced its previous editorial purpose. Rader was buried in Mountain View Cemetery in Altadena, California (the same cemetery in which the Armstrong family is buried). His funeral was presided over by Joseph Tkach, Jr.

== Bibliography ==
- Stanley Rader, 71; Advisor in Worldwide Church of God - Stanley Robert Rader, the long-time confidant of the late Herbert W. Armstrong of the Worldwide Church of God, has died. He was 71. - Los Angeles Times/July 4, 2002 - By Larry B. Stammer
- "The Devil and Stanley Rader" Article in The American Lawyer
