= Ernest L. Martin =

American archaeologist (1932–2002)

Ernest L. Martin (April 20, 1932 – January 2002) was an American meteorologist, minister in the Worldwide Church of God and author on Biblical topics. He is best known for his unconventional works on the Star of Bethlehem and the location of the Temple in Jerusalem.

== Background ==
Martin was born in Meeker, Oklahoma. He attended grade and high school in Exeter, California, and graduated from the College of the Sequoias in Visalia, California, which specialized in meteorology. From 1950 to 1954, he was a member of the United States Air Force which sent him to the University of New Mexico to further his education in meteorology, and following this he became a weather forecaster in Greenland. He spent another year at Lowry AFB working in research and development for High Altitude studies in Denver, Colorado.

== Ministry and teaching ==
During 1955, Martin became a supporter of the ministry of Herbert W. Armstrong and the Radio Church of God (later known as the Worldwide Church of God). He attended Ambassador College at Pasadena, California, in 1958 and later transferred to the campus in Bricket Wood, England. He was ordained as a minister of the Radio Church of God in 1959 and continued with his studies at Ambassador College to finally earn an unaccredited Ph.D. in education in 1966. From 1960 to 1972, he taught history, theology and elementary meteorology at the Ambassador College campus in Bricket Wood where he became Dean of Faculty.

Between 1969 and 1973, Ambassador College entered into an alliance with Hebrew University in Israel which had been negotiated by Martin. This undertaking commenced a five-year archaeological program with students from Ambassador College working on Dr. Benjamin Mazar's excavation near the Western Wall of the Temple Mount. During this period, Martin supervised 450 participating college students during summer months. The partnership was mentioned in a Time magazine article.

Following the closure of the Ambassador College campus in England, Martin became Chairman of the Department of Theology at Ambassador College in Pasadena, California, in 1973. In the following year, he severed his membership in the Worldwide Church of God. In 1974, he created the Foundation for Biblical Research in Pasadena where he remained as chairman until 1985. In the same year, he founded Associates for Scriptural Knowledge and became a member of various other societies.

== Author ==
In 1974, Martin wrote the first of five editions of The Tithing Dilemma of which over 100,000 copies were sold. It was this work which triggered the first of many major schisms within the Worldwide Church of God.

Martin proposed a recalculation of the birth of Jesus in his books The Birth of Christ Recalculated (1978) and The Star that Astonished the World (1996). He argued that the "Star of Bethlehem" was the planet Jupiter, called Zedeq ("Righteousness") in Hebrew, leading the wise men to Jesus in Bethlehem on December 25, 2 BCE, coinciding with the Jewish Festival of Hanukkah that year. Martin argued that the birth of Jesus happened on the evening of September 11, 3 BCE, which corresponds to Rosh Hashanah, the Jewish new year on the first of Tishri on the Jewish calendar.

In his 1999 book The Temples that Jerusalem Forgot, Martin argued that the Haram al-Sharif is not the location of the last Temple. This was significant given his relationship with Herbert W. Armstrong whose editorial in The Plain Truth magazine was cited by Denis Michael Rohan as a reason for setting fire to the Al Aqsa mosque during the 1960s.

The basis of this work began with Martin's first visit to Jerusalem in 1961 when he first met Benjamin Mazar and later his son Ory Mazar, who informed him of his belief that the Temples of Solomon and Zerubbabel were located on the Ophel mound to the north of the original Mount Zion on the southeast ridge. In a 1996 draft report to support this theory, Martin wrote, "I was then under the impression that Simon the Hasmonean (along with Herod a century later) moved the Temple from the Ophel mound to the Dome of the Rock area." However, after studying the words of Josephus concerning the Temple of Herod the Great, which was reported to be in the same general area of the former Temples, he then read the account of Eleazar who led the final contingent of Jewish resistance to the Romans at Masada which stated that the Roman fortress was the only structure left by 73 C.E.. "With this key in mind, I came to the conclusion in 1997 that all the Temples were indeed located on the Ophel mound over the area of the Gihon Spring." From these conclusions, Martin produced his book in which he asserted that the Temples of Jerusalem were located over the Gihon Spring and not over the Dome of the Rock. He wrote, "What has been amazing to me is the vast amount of Jewish, Muslim, and Christian records that remain available from the first to the sixteenth centuries that clearly vindicate the conclusions that I have reached in this book of research."

His other works are Restoring the Original Bible (1984), Secrets of Golgotha (1987), 101 Bible Secrets (1991), The Biblical Manual (1985) and The Essentials of New Testament Doctrine (1999).
