= Armstrong College =

Armstrong College may refer to:

- Armstrong College (California), a historic building in Berkeley, California, US
- Georgia Southern University-Armstrong Campus, formerly Armstrong College, Savannah, Georgia, US
- Herbert W. Armstrong College, an unaccredited theological college run by the Philadelphia Church of God, Edmond, Oklahoma, US. Sponsors the Armstrong Institute of Biblical Archaeology in Jerusalem.
- Armstrong College, a former College of Durham University, UK and a predecessor institution of Newcastle University, UK
