= Garner Ted Armstrong =

American evangelist (1930–2003)

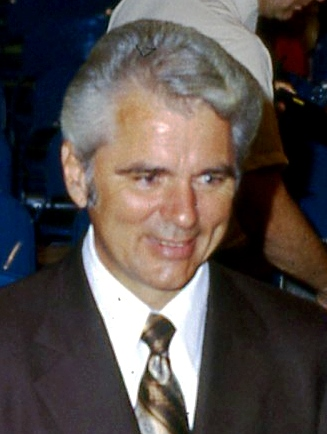
- Garner Ted Armstrong in 1979
- Born: February 9, 1930; Portland, Oregon, U.S.
- Died: September 15, 2003 (aged 73)
- Resting place: Gladewater Memorial Park (Gladewater, Texas)
- Other name: William Talboy Wright (pseudonym used for his book Churchill's Gold)
- Education: Ambassador University: BA (1956), MA (1960), Ph.D. (1964)
- Occupations: Minister, author, educator, radio and television commentator
- Known for: Voice of The World Tomorrow, President of Ambassador University (1975–1978)
- Spouse: Shirley Hammer Armstrong
- Parent: Herbert W. Armstrong
- Relatives: Dwight L. Armstrong (uncle)
- Website: garnertedarmstrong.org

Garner Ted Armstrong (February 9, 1930 – September 15, 2003) was an American evangelist and the son of Herbert W. Armstrong, founder of the Worldwide Church of God, at the time a Sabbatarian organization that taught observance of seventh-day Sabbath and annual Sabbath days based on Leviticus 23.

Armstrong initially became recognized when he succeeded his father as the voice of The World Tomorrow, the church's radio program that aired around the world. A television program of the same name followed, aired mostly in North America, eventually giving way to a Garner Ted Armstrong broadcast, a half-hour program that mixed news and biblical commentary. His polemical message was unlike that of most other religious broadcasters of his day.

== Brief biography ==
Armstrong's genealogy is described in his father's autobiography. The elder Armstrong reported that the Armstrong ancestors arrived in America in the late 17th century with William Penn. The ancestry was traced to Edward I of England. Armstrong's grandmother was "something like a third cousin to former President Herbert Hoover".

Armstrong was born in Portland, Oregon, to Loma Isabelle (Dillon) and Herbert W. Armstrong. He was raised in Eugene, Oregon, the youngest of four children. He was named for a great-grandmother on his mother's side, Martha Garner, who was born in Suffolk, England, in 1841 and died in Iowa in 1923, seven years before he was born.

Following service in the United States Navy during the Korean War, Armstrong returned to Pasadena, California, where his father had moved the church's operations in 1946. He was baptized in early 1953 (Origin and History, p. 36). He enrolled in Ambassador College, founded by his father and supported by the church. Ambassador was not regionally accredited, and Armstrong eventually completed bachelor's, master's, and doctoral degrees in the only discipline offered, theology. He was ordained a minister in 1955 and held key administrative posts in both the Worldwide Church of God and Ambassador College until he was disfellowshipped (excommunicated) by his father in 1978. Prior to his removal, he was executive vice president of the church and president of the college and was widely considered to be heir-apparent to succeed his father as head of the church and its operations.

=== Personality ===
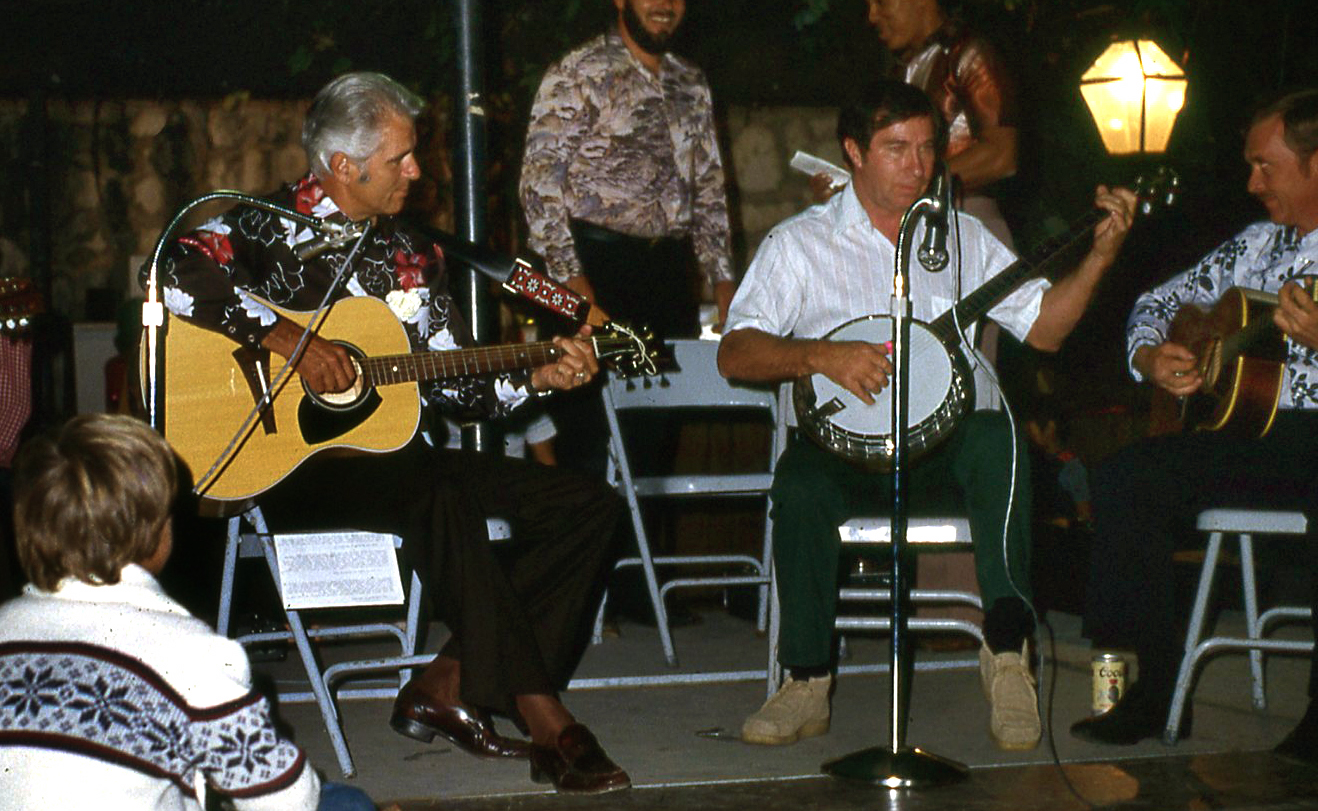
Armstrong performing at the Feast of Tabernacles in San Antonio, Texas, 1979

Armstrong was described as "movie star handsome" and was noted for his broadcasting talents. In radio and TV programs he mixed political, economic, and social news of the day with religious commentary. He was noted for adding "wry humor" into sermons that preached about the biblical prophesied return of Jesus Christ to the Earth.

In 1975, Garner Ted Armstrong arranged for his friend, Hee Haw co-host Buck Owens, to entertain attendees on Family Night at the annual fall Feast of Tabernacles church convention. Buck Owens and his band the Buckaroos traveled to five U.S. Feast of Tabernacles sites and performed before about 15,000 people. The concerts were attended by festival attendees and were also open to the general public.

To reciprocate, in 1976 Owens asked Armstrong to guest star on the Hee Haw show that starred Buck Owens and Roy Clark. He popped up out of the "corn patch" on the show to say "Sa-loot" to his hometown of Eugene, Oregon. He sang a country-western song he had written titled "Working Man's Hall of Fame" and joined "the whole Hee Haw gang" to sing the popular Ocean gospel song Put Your Hand in the Hand.

Country music star Merle Haggard said that his most popular song "Okie From Muskogee" was inspired by listening to a Garner Ted Armstrong radio program of The World Tomorrow.

== Ministry ==
Armstrong was ordained to the ministry by his father in 1955. G. T. Armstrong later reported in a sermon that he did not want to be a minister, to which his father answered something to the effect that his opposition to entering the ministry was a sign that he should. In 1957, he began to take over much of his father's broadcasting responsibilities. During that same year, he traveled extensively through South America. As a fluent Spanish speaker, he made several Spanish-language broadcasts of the World Tomorrow.

The decade of the 1970s brought a series of reversals for Armstrong's career, however. An article in the Los Angeles Times reported that "The rift between the father and his heir apparent began in 1972 when Herbert Armstrong ousted his son from the church for four months, after an extra-marital affair, saying the son was "in the bonds of Satan."

The year 1972 had been prominent in Herbert W. Armstrong's prophetic views, as elaborated in a booklet called 1975 in Prophecy!. January 1972 was supposed to be the conclusion of the second of two 19-year "time cycles" which, according to the elder Armstrong, had begun in 1953 when The World Tomorrow began to be heard over Radio Luxembourg in Europe. According to his theory, at the conclusion of that second 19-year time cycle the members of the church were expected to flee to a place of refuge, which leading ministers had speculated could be the ancient city of Petra, carved into rock in Jordan. Following this flight, World War III supposedly would begin, with a United States of Europe rising up to overthrow both the United States of America and the United Kingdom. This fitted with both of the Armstrongs' teachings of a theory generally referred to as British Israelism, outlined in the elder Armstrong's book The United States and Britain in Prophecy. When the church's prophecies about 1972 and 1975 did not occur, Armstrong proposed dropping such an approach in favor of one centered on Christian living and an outline of church doctrines and practice.

Nevertheless, by 1977 Armstrong's media exposure included a daily radio program broadcast on over 300 radio stations across the United States, 33 in Australia, and 11 in the Philippines, with other programs throughout the world rebroadcast in the German, Spanish, French, Italian, and Russian languages. With an annual television budget of six million dollars, his exposure also included television programs which appeared on up to 165 channels. For almost two years this included a daily television appearance. According to Armstrong, notables such as President Lyndon B. Johnson, Nelson Rockefeller, Cyrus Vance and Hubert Humphrey, as well as a number of U.S. senators, were frequent viewers of the broadcast. President Johnson personally told Armstrong during an afternoon lunch the two men had at Johnson's Texas ranch, "I watch your show (The World Tomorrow (radio and television)) all the time and I agree with most of what you have to say". Senator Bob Dole requested all copies of Armstrong's 1970's World Tomorrow broadcasts be preserved into the national archives of the Library of Congress TV & Film division.

His establishment of a "Systematic Theology Project" was eventually jettisoned by his father, but a form of it was later adopted by a separate church that Armstrong later established.

=== Relationship with Stanley R. Rader ===
By the mid 1970s, Stanley Rader, an attorney and church accountant who had been a personal assistant to Herbert W. Armstrong since 1958, appeared to be stepping into the number two position of administration previously thought to be Armstrong's domain. Relations between the two became strained and a power struggle ensued. One conflict was that Rader had set up privately owned affiliated corporations that were doing business with the church. Armstrong and others in the organization were skeptical of Rader's legal and financial dealings and suspected a bid to control the church's multimillion-dollar business. One objection to Rader's role was that, being Jewish, he had never been a baptized member of the church or a practicing Christian. That obstacle was removed in 1975 when Rader was baptized by the elder Armstrong.

By the mid 1970s two different and rival views were developing regarding the work and future of the church.

One plan was formulated by Armstrong, who wanted to take the church in a direction built around a larger publishing and broadcasting platform that would go out under his name. Armstrong was wary of prophecies built around specific dates, and he was reported to be against the idea of continuing to deliver messages that associated the U.S. and Britain with the Lost Ten Tribes. He experimented with turning the church's flagship magazine The Plain Truth into a tabloid-size newspaper in the style of the Christian Science Monitor. He envisioned a television broadcast along the lines of one that was later developed by the Christian Science Church, which created a short-lived nightly news program that was later seen on the Discovery Channel.

Meanwhile, Stanley Rader aided significantly in crafting a unique role for the senior Armstrong on the world stage: Herbert W. Armstrong was promoted to various governments as an "ambassador without portfolio for world peace." In that role he did not so much represent the Worldwide Church of God or Ambassador College as he did a completely new entity called the Ambassador International Cultural Foundation (AICF). This foundation helped to finance the Tatum O'Neal motion picture Paper Moon and a new and slick commercial publication called Quest; bought Everest House, a publishing company; and turned the Ambassador Auditorium, located on the college campus in Pasadena, into a performing arts venue that boasted an annual subscription series featuring world-renowned performers and celebrities from stage, screen and the recording arts. Gifts from the foundation helped Rader secure audiences with world leaders for the elder Armstrong, whose message was less an overt Christian one than a more general one about peace, brotherly love, giving instead of getting, and a "great unseen hand from someplace" intervening in world affairs.

Armstrong was known to disagree with this approach as well as the expenditure of funds on it and other foundation activities. It became an increasing point of division between father and son.

In 1977, he officiated at the wedding of his father to the former Ramona Martin. The two separated in 1982 and divorced in 1984.

=== Father and son part ways ===
As Rader's influence with the elder Armstrong grew, so did the gap between Armstrong and his father over operations and certain doctrinal positions of the church. In 1978 Herbert Armstrong excommunicated his son and fired him from all roles in the church and college on the night of Wednesday, June 28, 1978, by means of a phone call to Tyler, Texas. Armstrong moved to Tyler, Texas, where he founded the Church of God International and the Armstrong Evangelistic Association, through which he soon returned to the television airwaves.

Armstrong never again had the media outreach that he had enjoyed in his father's organization, nor did his new church ever rival his father's in membership statistics. The Church of God International did, however, become a haven for some former members of the Pasadena church who took exception to Rader's role and/or the elder Armstrong's autocratic style. As a result, members of the Worldwide Church of God were forbidden by Herbert Armstrong from having any contact with Armstrong, and his name was removed from a significant number of church publications. At the time of the separation, he was one of the Evangelists of the Worldwide Church of God.

However, in his later years, Armstrong's relationship with the Worldwide Church of God was somewhat cordial. Armstrong and his family were invited to stay on the Ambassador campus in Pasadena during the time of his father's funeral. He returned to the Big Sandy campus in 1986 for the funeral of Norval Pyle, an early Worldwide Church of God pioneer. In the spring of 1997, shortly before the university closed, he was interviewed by a staff writer from the Ambassador University student newspaper. Finally, the church archivist sent him several family heirlooms that were held in the Worldwide Church of God's possession following his father's death.

== Later ministry ==
He continued his ministry through the Church of God International (CGI) in the years that followed. Meanwhile, he appeared on both the John Ankerberg Show and The Oprah Winfrey Show.

He continued to conduct personal appearance campaigns throughout the United States, Australia, Jamaica, and Canada, but on a much smaller scale than during his heyday in the 1970s. The appearances also provided opportunities for unofficial reunions between those who had left and those who remained in the Worldwide Church of God.

In the fall of 1989, he travelled to Berlin to do on-the-spot radio broadcasts covering the fall of the Berlin Wall.

In 1997, following accusations by a masseuse named Sue Rae Robertson, Armstrong was asked to resign as leader of the CGI, but to remain a laymember, by the church's board of directors. No charges were ever filed in relation to the alleged assault, and civil cases brought against Armstrong and the CGI were dismissed. Instead, Armstrong chose to resign from CGI altogether and founded the Intercontinental Church of God.

Until his death, he was the head of his Armstrong Evangelistic Association, which he had established in 1978, and the Intercontinental Church of God.

== Death and legacy ==
Armstrong died on September 15, 2003, owing to complications from pneumonia. He was buried in Gladewater Memorial Park, approximately two miles east of the former Big Sandy, Texas, campus of Ambassador University. He is buried with his wife and her family: his father-in-law Roy Hammer, his mother-in-law Pearl Hammer, and several other members of the Hammer family. His parents, paternal grandmother, and brother are buried in Altadena, California. The Hammers were the donors of the original property on which the Ambassador campus was located. His widow, Shirley, died in 2014.

Rather than selecting a new media spokesman, the evangelistic association continues to broadcast old programs made by Armstrong on approximately 30 television stations and cable outlets according to the Armstrong TV/Radio Page of the ministry's website. The Intercontinental Church of God (United States) and Garner Ted Armstrong Evangelistic Association are now led by Mark Armstrong, who functions as CEO of the organizations and producer of the television outreach program.

== Writings ==
- — (1960). Your Marriage Can Be Happy.
- — (1963). The Plain Truth About Child Rearing. Based on doctoral dissertation
- — (1966). After Death...then What?.
- with Armstrong, Herbert W. (1966). The Wonderful World Tomorrow: What It Will Be Like.
- — (1968). A Whale of A Tale.
- — (1969). Modern Dating: Key to Success or Failure in Marriage.
- — (1969). Some Fishy Stories About Evolution.
- — (1971). A Theory For The Birds.
- — (1972). The Real Jesus.
  - — (1977). The Real Jesus (Expanded ed.). Sheed, Andres, McMichael.
- — (1973). What Is A Real Christian?.
- — (1973). "Satan's Fate". In Armstrong, Herbert W. (ed.). Did God Create a Devil.
- — (1975). Do You Have An Immortal Soul?.
- — (1979). How To Get Rid of Guilt.
- — (1980). Why Should You Repent?.
- — (1980). Oh God, Where Were You When I Needed You?.
- — (1981). Peter's Story.
- — (1981). Facts You Should Know About Christmas.
- — (1981). The Ten Commandments.
- — (1982). Saturday-Sunday, Which?.
- — (1982). What Is The Real Gospel?.
- — (1984). Europe and America in Prophecy.
- — (1984). Can You Understand Bible Prophecy?.
- — (1985). Believe It Or Not - The Bible Does Not Promise Heaven!.
- — (1986). The Passover - Is It For Christians?.
- — (1987). What Is The Mark of the Beast?.
- — (1988). Churchill's Gold. Published under the pseudonym William Talboy Wright.
- — (1989). The Answer to Unanswered Prayer.
- — (1989). The Shocking Truth About Satanism.
- — (1992). Violent Crime Can Be Stopped - Here's How!.
- — (1992). The Origin and History of the Church of God, International.
- — (1993). Betrayal and Forgiveness.
- — (1995). The Real Reasons Why Christ Came to This Earth.
- — (1995). God's Armor.
- — (1996). The Great Tribulation: Is It About to Happen?.
- — (1996). Life on Mars? Or Did God Create the Universe?.
- — (1997). The Beast of the Apocalypse: What Is It?.
- — (1998). Saved By Grace?.
- — (1999). Coming Soon...An Invasion From Outer Space!.

== Sources ==
- Eric Gilder and Mervyn Hagger. Prophecies of Dystopic “Old World, New World” Transitions Told: “The World Tomorrow” Radio Broadcasts to the United Kingdom: 1965-1967. Univers Enciclopedic, Bucharest, pp. 205-222. ISBN 978-973-637-159-2.
