= Joseph W. Tkach =

Second pastor general of the Worldwide Church of God

- Second Pastor General of the Worldwide Church of God
- Born: March 16, 1927; Chicago, Illinois, U.S.
- Died: September 23, 1995 (aged 68); Pasadena, California, U.S.
- Resting place: Mountain View Cemetery and Mausoleum, Altadena, California
- Spouse: Alice Elaine Apostolos (m. 1951)
- Children: 3

Joseph W. Tkach (/təˈkɒtʃ/; March 16, 1927 – September 23, 1995) was the appointed successor of Herbert W. Armstrong, founder of the Worldwide Church of God. Tkach became president and pastor general of the church upon the death of Armstrong in 1986. Tkach spearheaded a major doctrinal transformation of the Worldwide Church of God, abandoning Armstrong's unconventional doctrines and bringing the church into accord with orthodox evangelical Christianity. His son, Joseph Tkach Jr., continued his work and in 1997 the Worldwide Church of God became a member of the National Association of Evangelicals.

During Tkach's tenure, the changes that he implemented stirred intense controversy and internal dissent among the majority who continued to follow Armstrong's theology. The dissenters labeled the changes as heresy and most left to form new church organizations. Within the mainstream, Protestant community, some hailed Tkach's reforms, which brought a church from the extreme fringes to modern orthodoxy, as unprecedented.

== Background ==
He was born March 16, 1927, in Chicago, the youngest of five children and the only son of Vassil and Mary Tkach. The name Tkach /təˈkɒtʃ/ is of Carpatho-Rusyn origin, and his parents were originally from Czechoslovakia. The neighborhood where he grew up was composed mainly of blue-collar working people of Russian origin. He graduated from Tilden High School in southwest Chicago. He then served a short term in the U.S. Navy near the end of World War II and afterward returned to his native Chicago. On March 31, 1951, Tkach married Alice Elaine Apostolos; they had three children: Joseph Jr., Tanya, and Jennifer.

Tkach grew up in the Russian Orthodox faith, but eventually his family, including his parents, became interested in the Radio Church of God through the radio broadcast of Herbert W. Armstrong, the founder of the church. The Radio Church of God would eventually change its name in 1968 to the Worldwide Church of God (WCG), the church that Tkach would lead. It was a church characterized by the strong influence of its founder and his unique doctrines based on his own interpretation of the Bible. Initially, Tkach was the only member of his family who was not interested in listening to the radio broadcasts. However, a purportedly miraculous event was to change him. At the time, Tkach suffered from severe ulcers and was required to stay on a special diet. His wife then suggested that God would heal him if he were to become a minister in Armstrong's church. Although skeptical, he accepted the suggestion of becoming a minister and he found himself cured, never again to suffer from the ulcers. He was baptized by Radio Church of God minister, Dean Blackwell, on March 1, 1957. On June 7, 1961, Blackwell ordained him a deacon in the Chicago congregation, and on June 3, 1963, Roderick C. Meredith, who would eventually lead a breakaway church from the WCG, ordained him as an elder.

In 1966 Tkach moved his family to Pasadena, California, where he enrolled in classes at Ambassador College, a state-approved, but not regionally accredited, college that was sponsored by the WCG. In 1974, he was ordained to the rank of preaching elder. Armstrong taught that the Bible endorsed "ranks" in the ministry, and elders could progress up the ladder from local elder to preaching elder to pastor to evangelist. The highest rank, apostle, was reserved for the leader of the church.

In the late 1970s a period of financial and leadership disputes occurred within the church hierarchy, with church treasurer, Stanley Rader, at the center of many of the disputes. The gravest incident was the church being placed in financial receivership by the Attorney General of California, George Deukmejian, an action that was later disallowed in court. Tkach took an active role in the defense of Armstrong, Rader, and the church headquarters' operations. He rallied the WCG membership to take action against the court proceedings. Armstrong recognized his effectiveness and subsequently ordained him to the rank of evangelist on September 27, 1979. See Evangelists of the Worldwide Church of God. In March 1981 Armstrong appointed him to the WCG's advisory council of elders, and eventually, Armstrong named him Director of Church Administration, one of the most prominent administrative positions other than Armstrong himself.

== Selection by Armstrong ==
Armstrong had recovered from severe heart problems in the late 1970s, but by the mid-1980s he was experiencing rapidly declining health. By 1985 this was common knowledge among church members as the 93-year-old preacher had not been seen in public for several months. According to The Worldwide News, the official church newsletter, Armstrong told his advisory council on January 7, 1986, of his decision to appoint Tkach to succeed him in the event of his death. It was also announced by Armstrong in a letter to members of the church. Armstrong died on January 16, 1986, only nine days after naming his successor.

Initially there were few visible changes within the church. Tkach continued Armstrong's tradition of traveling abroad, although his emphasis was more on visiting church members and operations than on Armstrong's agenda of visiting world leaders to attempt to witness to them. The church entered a period of rapid growth during the early years of Tkach's administration. In fact, the membership peaked during his tenure at 126,800 members in 1988. The finances were stable, largely due to the church's teaching that members should tithe, giving a tenth of their gross income to the church. The church magazine, The Plain Truth, continued to serialize the final and most controversial book by Armstrong, Mystery of the Ages. Tkach also continued, at least in public, to promote the church's unique doctrines.

Tkach did not have the charismatic personality of his predecessor. Unlike Armstrong, who kept a strong hold of the reins, Tkach delegated many tasks, including the presentation of the church-supported television broadcast, The World Tomorrow and the authoring of articles and booklets produced by the church. Although Tkach was not known as a theologian, and made no claims as such, eventually he was to have profound impact on the theological foundations of the WCG.

== Doctrinal changes ==
The first major change under Tkach's tenure was the WCG's doctrine on healing. Previously the church taught that true believers were healed by faith in God and not by doctors. Tkach asked the church leadership to study the question. Once Tkach was satisfied with the results of the study, he officially softened the church's teaching on the matter, encouraging members to seek proper treatment while retaining faith in God as a healer.

Another officially published doctrinal change was that women in the church would be allowed to wear makeup. In the earliest years of the denomination, Armstrong announced the prohibition of makeup for women. In the 1970s that prohibition was lifted, but in 1981 Armstrong reinstituted the teaching. In 1988, Tkach lifted the ban for good.

The first major sign of dissent occurred in 1989 when a WCG minister, Gerald Flurry, published a manuscript outlining what he and others believed were disturbing trends in the work, including the beginnings of the doctrinal departure from what had been established by Armstrong. Flurry and another minister, John Amos, were disfellowshipped and went on to form the Philadelphia Church of God (PCG). The PCG began an alternative radio program and magazine, and over the next several years a few thousand WCG members left to join the PCG. Despite this, Tkach continued to implement additional changes in thinking, including the shift in emphasis away from observing world events primarily through the lens of prophetic interpretation; the removal of the prohibition of interracial marriage; the allowance of work on the Sabbath; the acceptance of the trinitarian doctrine; and the acceptance of the validity of other Christian denominations, among many other changes. Older Armstrong publications that supported the church's once unique doctrines were allowed to go out-of-print. However, in order to settle legal matters between WCG and splinter group PCG, WCG agreed to sell PCG the copyrights to many of Armstrong's publications, allowing PCG to continue to publish them.

As these reforms were being carried out, questions arose as to whether the decisions were truly made by Tkach himself or by others in the church leadership. The church leadership at that time included Mike Feazell, executive assistant and editorial advisor to Tkach, Greg Albrecht, editor of The Plain Truth, and Joseph Tkach, Jr., the son of Joseph W. Tkach, and church administration director. One conspiracy theory stated that the decisions did not come from Tkach himself but from the church leadership. Another stated that the ideas did originate from Tkach but he formed them early in his career, kept them hidden from Armstrong, and only allowed the ideas to come to fruition after Armstrong's death. Feazell claims that the reforms were initially driven by a re-examination of church literature that was mainly spurred by questions posed by church ministers and members. These examinations were done by Tkach and Feazell, but the final decisions and approval of materials for publication were made by Tkach. By 1990, Tkach authorized the formation of a "Doctrinal Manual Group", consisting of thirteen ministers and Ambassador College faculty members with the mission of assuring doctrinal consistency, refinement, and advice to the Pastor General. Tkach reviewed and made the final decisions on all recommendations made by the group.

The church's traditions of following the Sabbath, the Old Testament holy days, and tithing were initially retained. But some WCG ministers and members continued to express alarm over the doctrinal revisions Tkach had already made, and from time to time some would leave to create dissident branches. They included Tkach's one-time mentor, Roderick C. Meredith, who formed the Global Church of God in 1992. As various breakaway groups were established, additional clusters of church members followed.

== Christmas Eve sermon ==
The doctrinal changes in the church occurred gradually, but by 1994, most of the concepts of Armstrongism had been largely modified or discontinued. However, the major bombshell was dropped during what is now called the Christmas Eve Sermon. Tapes of Tkach's sermon (dated January 7, 1995) were delivered to local congregations for viewing. In this sermon, he publicly declared that the Worldwide Church of God was a New Covenant church and, therefore, not bound by the terms of the Old Covenant. Christian theology defines the Old Covenant as the Mosaic Law embodied in the Torah. Hence, by making this statement, Tkach officially dropped all doctrines based on Mosaic Law (i.e., the keeping of the Sabbath, the Holy Days, and the dietary laws), making observance of such practices an individual choice. He also dropped the requirement of tithing, declaring that giving as taught in the New Testament was voluntary. The last change had a significant and rather immediate impact on church finances.

These and other major changes brought about major defections among ministers and members, which in turn contributed to a further drop in church revenue. In order to bring the finances in order, major changes in the church infrastructure were implemented. The World Tomorrow, which had seen record numbers of viewers in the early years of the Tkach administration, was stopped. The Plain Truth publication runs were reduced. Staff at the church headquarters were laid off. The famous, church-subsidized Ambassador Auditorium concert series was canceled and offers were sought for the purchase of the Ambassador College Pasadena campus.

== Final days ==
The Christmas Eve sermon only accelerated the departure of church members. A new branch, the United Church of God, was created in 1995 by a conference of departing ministers and named Tkach's one-time associate and former The World Tomorrow presenter, David Hulme, as president. It eventually became the largest of the groups to break away from the WCG during this period. Although revenues continued to drop, Tkach remained steadfastly committed to the changes that he had implemented.

On May 12, 1995, Tkach had surgery to remove his gall bladder. Shortly thereafter, he was readmitted to the hospital because of severe intestine and back pain. Surgeons then removed a grapefruit-size tumor from his intestines and discovered he had colon cancer. In a letter to ministers, dated September 6, Tkach announced that he was also diagnosed with bone cancer. He elected not to undertake radiation treatments. As Armstrong had done before him, Tkach named a successor to become pastor general in the event of his death. In that case, it was Tkach's son, Joseph Tkach Jr.

Tkach died on September 23, 1995, of cancer, aged 68, and is buried in Altadena, California. He was survived by his wife, Alice Elaine Tkach (1930–2022), three children, and extended family.

== Assessment ==
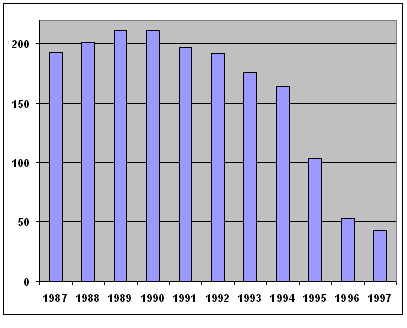
WCG revenue in millions of dollars from 1987–1997. Note the peak in 1990 midway through Tkach's tenure and its decline through to 1997.

The impact of Tkach's tenure as the head of the WCG was notable. Church income dropped from a high of over $200 million in 1990 to $50 million by 1996. By then the church could only count 49,000 as members, less than half from its peak. The circulation of The Plain Truth, distributed free by subscription and via newsstand distribution around the globe, fell from a peak of 8,000,000 to less than 100,000 before it switched to a paid subscription status. Eventually the magazine was spun off into a separate, independent, evangelical ministry. The number of employees at the church headquarters fell from 1,000 to about 50. Ambassador University, as the college had become after earning regional accreditation in Texas, ceased operations in 1997 as the church could no longer provide its annual operating subsidy. The Pasadena campus was finally sold in 2004.

In assessing the work of Tkach, there are two points of view. The critics of Tkach, especially those who formed the splinter churches, see Tkach as the key person responsible for the collapse of the WCG. They believe that the changes he brought were a turn against God and say his rejection of Armstrong's unique doctrines were, at best, without biblical foundation.

Tkach's supporters, including those in the leadership of the WCG, see events differently. The WCG describes Tkach's tenure as "A Decade of Painful Change" and that the end result of his work was the reconciliation of the church with mainstream Christianity. Ruth Tucker, an evangelical leader and an early supporter of the changes which occurred in the WCG, wrote in an article in Christianity Today that

The "changes"—as they are referred to by insiders—are truly historic. Never before in the history of Christianity has there been such a complete move to orthodox Christianity by an unorthodox fringe church.

Vern Bullough, a secular humanist and senior editor of Free Inquiry, commented on the significance of the changes noting:

The shedding of almost every doctrine the Worldwide Church of God once clung to is a story almost without parallel in American religious history.

After his death, the WCG reiterated its full acceptance of the doctrinal changes implemented by Tkach and published an apology to current and former members of the church for the impact previous doctrines had had on members. As evidence that Tkach's work was instrumental in the move toward mainstream Christianity, the WCG was accepted into the membership of the National Association of Evangelicals within two years of his death.

== Notes ==
Religious titles
Preceded by Herbert W. Armstrong	Pastor General of the Worldwide Church of God; 1986–1995	Succeeded by Joseph Tkach, Jr.
