= Joseph Tkach =

Joseph Tkach may refer to:

- Joseph W. Tkach (1927–1995), second Pastor General of the Worldwide Church of God
- Joseph Tkach Jr. (born 1951), third Pastor General of the Worldwide Church of God
