= United States in Prophecy =

Front cover of Herbert Armstrong's United States and Britain in Prophecy (1945)

United States in Prophecy was the original title of a publication that became known by its longer name of United States and British Commonwealth in Prophecy and published in various editions and formats after 1945. It was written under the byline of Herbert W. Armstrong who had assistance from staff members of Ambassador College. The publication related the views, beliefs and teachings of the Worldwide Church of God with regard to the identity of the so-called Ten Lost Tribes of Israel and for many years it was distributed as a companion booklet to 1975 in Prophecy! by the same author and publisher.

== Origins ==
The contents of the booklet were not original and many have claimed by comparison texts that most of its content came from an existing book called Judah's Sceptre and Joseph's Birthright by J. H. Allen which was originally published in 1902. That book claimed to be "An Analysis of the Prophecies of the Scriptures in regard to the Royal Family of Judah and the Many Nations of Israel, the Lost Ten Tribes".

== See also ==
- Armstrongism
- Alan Campbell
- Christian Zionism
- Christianity and Biblical prophecy
- Christianity and antisemitism
- Christianity and Judaism
- Jewish Christians
- Supersessionism
- Unification Church and anti-Semitism
