= Philadelphia Church of God =

American New Religious Christian church based in Edmond, Oklahoma

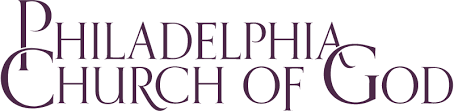
- Classification: Christianity
- Orientation: Restorationism
- Theology: Armstrongism
- Governance: Hierarchical polity
- Leader: Gerald R. Flurry
- Region: International
- Headquarters: Edmond, Oklahoma
- Founder: Gerald R. Flurry
- Origin: December 7, 1989; Edmond, Oklahoma
- Separated from: Worldwide Church of God
- Separations: *Church of God's Faithful; *Church of God Scattered Faithful; *Faithful Church of God in Laodicea; *The Church of God; *Armstrong Remembrancers; *Keepers of God's Covenant
- Members: Approximately 5,000
- Official website: https://pcg.church/

The Philadelphia Church of God (PCG) is an American new religious organization. Its headquarters is in the city of Edmond, Oklahoma. The PCG is a sectarian splinter group of a new religious organization called Grace Communion International, formerly the Worldwide Church of God (WCG). Former WCG members, Gerald R. Flurry and John Amos, founded the PCG, in 1989. The PCG was named for the church of Philadelphia, one of the "seven churches" in the Book of Revelation, and proclaims itself to be "the true church".

== Media activity ==
The PCG produces an array of print, online, television, radio, and streaming programs, including the print and web publication "Philadelphia Trumpet". According to its website, "the Trumpet—and all literature offered to you free on this site—is paid for by the tithes and offerings of members of the Philadelphia Church of God and their co-workers."

== Affiliated organizations ==
The PCG also runs a number of affiliated organizations, including the unaccredited Herbert W. Armstrong College in Edmond and the Armstrong Institute of Biblical Archaeology in Jerusalem. The latter promotes literalist and maximalist interpretations of current Biblical archaeology research in the Levant.

== Beliefs and teachings ==
The Philadelphia Church of God claims that it looks to the Bible for all guidance and believes that the Bible is the full word of God.

Claiming to follow WCG founder Herbert W. Armstrong's teachings, the Philadelphia Church of God rejects the orthodox Christian doctrine of the Trinity, teaching that the Holy Spirit is not a separate aspect of God but rather is the "power of God".

The PCG also endorses a variety of British Israelism, a pseudohistorical belief with origins in the 16th century that posits that the Ten Lost Tribes of Israel became the Anglo-Saxons, whose descendants founded both Great Britain and the United States. According to the PCG, the British and Americans have been specially endowed by God. The PCG interprets Biblical warnings against "falling away" as directed at these two nations.

The PCG recognizes the Sabbath from sundown Friday to sundown Saturday. Similar to American New Religion Christian Science, the PCG rejects medical care. Members refuse to bear arms or otherwise serve in the military.

Flurry claims to be a prophet and says that God continues to give him new revelations, and he warns the "Laodiceans", the United States and British Commonwealth, and Israel of their impending destruction through his various media programs and publications.

The PCG is one of several offshoot groups of the WCG. Since its incorporation, members have left the PCG to form splinter groups of their own.

== History ==
American preacher Herbert W. Armstrong (1892–1986) started the "Worldwide Church of God" (WCG) during the Great Depression. At the time of Armstrong's death in 1986, the WCG was headquartered in California.

Armstrong used radio and television to teach an unorthodox form of Christianity that was opposed by many other Christian denominations but which found a large audience of converts. The doctrines espoused by the WCG are collectively termed "Armstrongism".

In 1986, the WCG minister Joseph Tkach succeeded Armstrong. Upon assuming leadership, Tkach began to disavow key aspects of Armstrongism including nontrinitarianism; these disavowals moved the denomination closer to traditional Evangelicalism. The moves were controversial within the church and many members left, some forming new offshoot churches.

A turning point in the conflict occurred when the church, under Tkach, sought to discontinue Armstrong’s book Mystery of the Ages. Many who saw Armstrong’s doctrine as life law became disillusioned with Tkach. In response to Tkach's changes, Gerald Flurry (1935–present), a minister of a WCG church in Oklahoma, wrote a polemic that he called Malachi’s Message. In his polemic, which he distributed to WCG members and leaders, Flurry denounced Tkach's rejections of Armstrongism.

Flurry and co-minister John Amos eventually left the WCG and incorporated the "Philadelphia Church of God" in Edmond in 1989 with the stated purpose of continuing Armstrong's teachings. The PCG claims to have members in the United States, Canada, Australia, New Zealand and South Africa.

== Characterizations by media ==
Oklahoma City-based Fox affiliate KOKH-TV aired an exposé on the Philadelphia Church of God on November 24, 2008. The piece detailed the PCG's apocalyptic message and compared Flurry to David Koresh and PCG to the Branch Davidian doomsday cult. Church leadership disputed the comparisons in a statement released to a local newspaper.

Amid the COVID-19 pandemic, the Daily Express noted that the PCG, along with other religious organizations, flooded social media with misinformation and fear-mongering prophecies. In another 2020 article, the Daily Express criticized Gerald Flurry for his predictions regarding Donald Trump.

== Copyright disputes ==
In 1997, the Philadelphia Church of God published Armstrong's Mystery of the Ages, triggering a six-year legal battle with the Worldwide Church of God over the book's copyright. The WCG won the initial lawsuit, but the PCG filed a countersuit for the right to reproduce 18 other Armstrong works. WCG said it fought the countersuit because it did not want to see the "heretical" works re-published.

In a 2003 settlement, the WCG agreed to sell the rights to 19 books by Armstrong to the PCG for $3 million. The settlement also allows the PCG to reproduce Armstrong’s teachings.

== Financial operation ==
The Philadelphia Church of God is registered as a 501(c)(3) charity and is thus exempt from having to pay federal income tax. Contributions are kept confidential and are tax deductible under applicable federal and international law.

PCG members are expected to contribute ten percent of their income to the church.

According to PCG, approximately "70 percent of all income for the Church’s operations comes from the tithes and offerings of members, while the balance comes from... non-member contributors", whom the PCG labels either "donors" or "co-workers".

The church defines a "donor" as a non-member who contributes less than twice in any six-month period, and whose annual contribution is less than $500, while a "co-worker" is a non-member who makes two or more contributions in any six-month period, or whose annual contribution exceeds $500.

The PCG's peak revenue was $6.6 million in 2023.

== See also ==
- Ambassador College
- Church of God (Seventh Day)

== Sources and further reading ==
- Barrett, David V. (2013-01-02). The Fragmentation of a Sect: Schism in the Worldwide Church of God. Oxford University Press. ISBN 978-0190492892.
- Melton, J. Gordon (2003). Encyclopedia of American Religions. Gale. ISBN 978-0-7876-6384-1.
- Tucker, Ruth A. (2004). Another Gospel: Cults, Alternative Religions, and the New Age Movement. HarperCollins Christian Publishing. ISBN 978-0-310-25937-4.
