= Joseph Tkach Jr. =

American minister

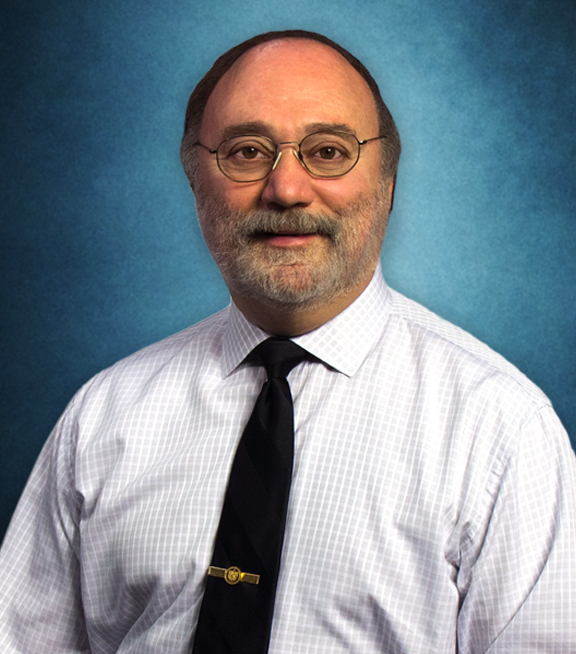
- Tkach in 2014
- Born: December 24, 1951 (age 74); Chicago, Illinois, U.S.
- Occupation: Minister
- Years active: 1986–present
- Website: Official website

Joseph Tkach Jr. is an American minister and formerly president of Grace Communion International, an evangelical Protestant denomination based in Charlotte, North Carolina. He hosted the weekly web-series Speaking of LIFE.

Since assuming his responsibilities in 1995, Tkach oversaw a period of radical change within the denomination that began during the administration of his father, Joseph W. Tkach. Once a strict seventh-day Sabbatarian organization that denied the Trinity, required observance of Old Testament law and adhered to Anglo-Israelism, the church has abandoned those and other teachings in favor of a doctrine of salvation by grace through faith.

== Early life and education ==
He was born on December 23, 1951, in Chicago, Illinois. He spent most of his childhood in Chicago until his parents moved to Pasadena, California in 1966. He attended Ambassador College, from 1969 to 1973, when he received a bachelor of arts degree in theology. He was ordained a minister of the church in 1976. From 1976 to 1984, he was mainly involved in social work, initially with a private agency working on rehabilitation programs for juvenile delinquents and later for the state of Arizona serving the developmentally disabled. He received a master's degree in business administration from Western International University in Phoenix, in 1984. From 1984 to 1986, he worked for Intel Corporation in Phoenix, where he supervised the corporate services training department. In 1986, he was hired to assist his father in the church administration department, eventually becoming director. When the elder Tkach became ill in 1995 with cancer, he appointed his son to succeed him as denominational president in the event of his death, which occurred that September at age 68.

He received a doctor of ministry degree from Azusa Pacific University in Azusa, California, in May 2000. He was on the board of directors of the National Association of Evangelicals.

== Leadership ==
As denominational president and with the support of several key leaders in the church, Tkach Jr. continued the doctrinal transformation of the Worldwide Church of God (WCG). In the process, he encountered a mixture of acceptance and resistance from members within the church. External acceptance came from other ministries, but there were also many organizations and ministries who were not convinced the church had gone far enough with its changes to be considered truly evangelical. Aided by several influential individuals within mainstream Christian churches, the WCG was able to forge positive relationships with other Christian organizations and individuals, such as Hank Hanegraaf, president of the Christian Research Institute and a leader of the Christian countercult movement, and Ruth Tucker, who wrote an article, "From the Fringe to the Fold", on changes in the church that appeared in the July 15, 1996 issue of Christianity Today. The Worldwide Church of God became a member of the National Association of Evangelicals in 1997. The same year, Tkach published a book, Transformed by Truth, outlining the process of transformation in the church. In April 2009, Tkach Jr. announced the organization would be changing its name to Grace Communion International from Worldwide Church of God. That was done mainly as a "celebration" of the doctrinal transformation and renewal the church had gone through.

On January 1, 2019, Tkach retired and stepped down as President of Grace Communion International. On that date, Vice President Greg Williams assumed the duties of President.

== Publications ==
- Tkach Jr., Joseph, Transformed by Truth, Multnomah, 1997; ISBN 1-57673-181-2
