= The World Tomorrow (radio and television) =

- The World Tomorrow title card
- Genre: Religious
- Presented by: Herbert W. Armstrong; Garner Ted Armstrong; David Hulme; David Albert; Richard Ames; Ronald Kelley; Leon Daniels; Bruce Horne
- Original language: English

Production
- Running time: 30 minutes

Original release
- Release: 1934 – 1994

The World Tomorrow is a half-hour radio and television program which was sponsored by the Worldwide Church of God (originally known as the Radio Church of God) led by Herbert W. Armstrong. It originally ran from 1934 to 1994. A 15-minute version of the radio program (under varied translations of The World Tomorrow) was broadcast in the French, German, Italian, Russian, and Spanish languages.

== Radio ==
Herbert W. Armstrong secured a temporary 15-minute slot on KORE, Eugene, Oregon, on October 9, 1933. That became a permanent half-hour slot on January 7, 1934. Armstrong founded the Radio Church of God with the first broadcast in 1934, to serve as the home church for his pioneering broadcast-based ministry. Armstrong's radio program "eventually reached millions with its message of the imminent end of the world to be followed by the second coming of Christ."

Following the 1939 World's Fair in New York City, the broadcast was renamed The World Tomorrow, inspired by the theme of the fair, "the World of Tomorrow". In 1968, the Radio Church of God changed its name to the Worldwide Church of God.

== Television ==
There have been three eras of The World Tomorrow on television.

=== 1950s ===
The first era featured Herbert W. Armstrong speaking from a Hollywood sound stage in the 1950s, before the advent of videotape, when all syndicated programs had to be recorded on film. The original series was shown on a portion of the ABC Television Network for half an hour, once a week, in black and white.

=== 1967 to 1986 ===
The second era began in 1967, beginning with black-and-white television broadcasts before changing to color in 1968. They continued well into the 1980s. The presenter was originally Garner Ted Armstrong, youngest son of Herbert Armstrong. Following his ouster from his father's church in mid-1978 and his subsequent founding of his own church, the Church of God International, Herbert W. Armstrong resumed the presentation. The broadcasts largely involved analysis of how current events in the world tied into the church's views of Biblical prophecies. Both the radio and television broadcasts of The World Tomorrow invariably told their audience how to receive the church's magazine, The Plain Truth, the content of which was largely similar to that of the broadcasts.

At its peak, the radio program was broadcast worldwide on 360 stations, and the television program was viewed by 20 million people on 165 stations.

=== 1986 to 1994 ===
Following Herbert Armstrong's death in 1986, the television program was presented by David Hulme, David Albert, Richard Ames, and Ronald Kelley, on a rotating basis until 1994, when doctrinal shifts in the Worldwide Church of God, and declining revenues, led to the program's cancellation.

== Format ==
The programs originated daily in a half-hour format, primarily from a studio located on the campus of Ambassador College in Pasadena, California, which was owned and operated by the church as a then-unaccredited liberal arts institution. Other studios were located at Ambassador College, Bricket Wood, Herts, England, and Ambassador College (later accredited as Ambassador University) at Big Sandy, Texas, U.S.

In 1958, Garner Ted Armstrong took over the narration of the half-hour all-talk presentation.

The program was introduced and concluded by the voice of Hollywood radio and television announcer Art Gilmore. The World Tomorrow concluded with a segment of music from the Capitol Hi "Q" production music library (Reel M-27, cue C-95B, "Documentary Legato End Title", composed by William Loose) over which Art Gilmore gave the program address which varied according to the country that it was being aired in, or where its broadcast was intended to be received.

=== International versions ===
A 15-minute and usually once-a-week version of the same program was broadcast by various speakers in the French, German, Italian, Portuguese, Russian, and Spanish languages.

- French: The French language edition was primarily aired in parts of Canada and Haiti over several local stations and in Europe over the super-power station Europe 1. The presenter was Dibar Apartian who recorded the programs in the same studio used by Herbert W. and later Garner Ted Armstrong on the Pasadena, California campus of Ambassador College. The program was also supported by a French-language edition of The Plain Truth magazine.
- German: The German language edition was primarily aired in Europe over Europe 1. The presenter was a graduate of Ambassador College in Pasadena where the program was recorded. The program was supported by a German language edition of The Plain Truth magazine.
- Italian: The Italian language edition was primarily aired in Montreal, Quebec and Toronto, Ontario in Canada over two local stations. The presenter was also a graduate of Ambassador College in Pasadena where the program was also recorded.
- Russian: The Russian language edition was primarily aired for a short period of time in the 1950s-1960s over the super-power station Radio Monte Carlo, which was beamed towards the USSR. The presenter was a Russian-language Hollywood presenter who translated the English scripts and then recorded the programs.
- Spanish: The Spanish language edition was primarily aired in parts of South America, although it was also aired from Porto, Portugal. The original presenter was Dr. Benjamin Rea who was Vice-Chancellor of Ambassador College at Bricket Wood in Hertfordshire, England which is where he recorded the programs in the radio studio located on the campus. The program was also supported by a Spanish language edition of La Pura Verdad magazine.

=== Archived episodes ===
Copies of The World Tomorrow broadcast episodes from 1978 to 1983 are held in the Television Religion Collection of the United States Library of Congress. The copies were placed into the Library of Congress archival holdings at the request of United States Senator Bob Dole.

== Rights to use title ==
A new trademark for the television program name The World Tomorrow was registered in 2004 by Earl and Shirley Timmons. The Timmons, members of the WCG, and Garner Ted Armstrong's Church of God International and Intercontinental Church of God, split from the Armstrong organization after the death of Garner Ted Armstrong, forming a breakaway independent group named Church of God, Worldwide Ministries, with its headquarters in Sevierville, Tennessee.
