= Ambassador Auditorium =

Auditorium in Pasadena, California

Coordinates: 34.14337°N 118.15641°W

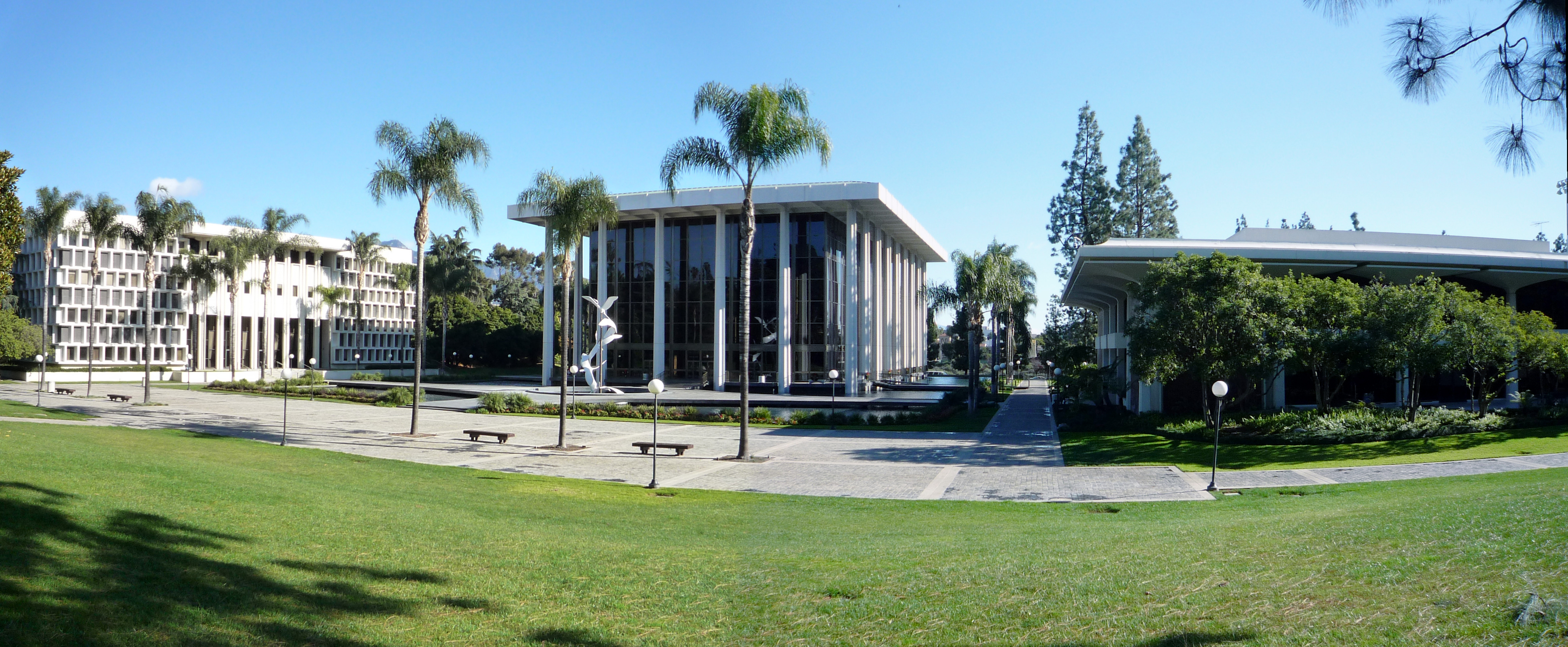
The Ambassador Auditorium, center, along with other former Ambassador College buildings, in December 2008.

Ambassador Auditorium is located on the historic Ambassador College campus in Pasadena, California, United States. The auditorium's main hall has a capacity of 1,262 people. Some concertgoers call it "The Carnegie Hall of the West". Ambassador Auditorium is a large chamber music-sized hall with large concert halls. It seats 1,262 people. This concert hall hosted 20 seasons of musicians and performers from 1974 to 1995.

It was built under the guidance of Herbert W. Armstrong as both a facility to be used by the Worldwide Church of God (WCG) for church services, college functions for the then adjacent Ambassador College, and as a concert hall for public performances celebrating the performing arts. It was officially opened by the Vienna Symphony Orchestra.

== History ==
After 2,500 concerts and recitals, the WCG, which operated the college and auditorium, ceased operation of both in the 1990s and sold the property. Under Joseph W. Tkach Sr., the performing arts series was shut down in 1995, saying they could no longer afford to subsidize the program and that it was not central to the mission of the church. The WCG later relocated its operations to nearby Glendora.

On January 26, 1996, National Public Radio staged a battle of the bands between the contending cities in Super Bowl XXX. Pittsburgh's River City Brass Band played Semper Fidelis by John Philip Sousa and the Battle Royal March by Fred Jewell in concert at Ambassador Auditorium, followed by a performance from Dallas at the Meyerson Symphony Hall.

On May 14, 2004, the church announced the sale of approximately 13 acres (53,000 m^{2}) of its former 31-acre (125,000 m^{2}) campus to Harvest Rock Church (HRC) and Maranatha High School. The sale included the Ambassador Auditorium, now under the sole ownership of Che Ahn's Harvest Rock Church of Pasadena. Since the acquisition of Ambassador Auditorium, HRC has re-opened the venue to the public. It hosts many regional ensembles, including the Colburn Orchestra and the Pasadena Symphony. Harvest Rock Church's services, conferences and special events are also held at the Auditorium along with Maranatha's.

From 2010–2019, the Ambassador Auditorium surroundings underwent massive change as the original Ambassador College campus was parceled up and sold to developers who tore down most other structures on the campus, including the Fine Arts & Science Centers, Hall of Administration, and the library, in favor of apartment and condominium structures.

As of late June 2024, Harvest Rock Church has announced the Ambassador Auditorium will be offered for sale for $45m.

Then, as of May 2025, Pastor Che Ahn made an announcement to the congregation that he made the decision that the auditorium is no longer for sale and has been off the market.

== Notable Attendees ==
It is estimated that 2.5 million attendees saw over 2,500 concerts at Ambassador Auditorium by Pavarotti, Plácido Domingo, Claudio Arrau, Vladimir Ashkenazy, Horacio Gutierrez, Alicia de Larrocha, Arthur Rubinstein, Andrés Segovia, Yo-Yo Ma, Jean-Pierre Rampal, Gerhard Oppitz, Bing Crosby, Sammy Davis Junior, Frank Sinatra, the Vienna Philharmonic, the Vienna Symphony, the Berlin Philharmonic under Herbert von Karajan (including Mahler Symphony No. 9 on the last program in 1982) and others during this period.
