= Ambassador College =

Private college in California, U.S. (1947–1997)

- Active: 1947–1997
- Location: Pasadena, California, U.S.

Ambassador College (1947–1997) was a four-year liberal arts college run by the Worldwide Church of God. The college was established in 1947 in Pasadena, California, by radio evangelist Herbert W. Armstrong, leader of what was then the Radio Church of God, later renamed the Worldwide Church of God. The college was approved by the state of California to grant degrees.

In 1960 a second campus was opened at Bricket Wood, Hertfordshire, England, and in 1964 a third campus was opened in Big Sandy, Texas. At the time Ambassador closed for financial reasons in May 1997, it had operated for 50 years and had become regionally accredited by the Southern Association of Colleges and Schools.

== History ==
The history of Ambassador College was tied to the development of the Radio/Worldwide Church of God. The name Radio Church of God was initially selected in the 1930s, because Herbert Armstrong started the church as a radio program in Eugene, Oregon. The ministry grew to include publishing, and congregations were formed, first in the United States and then gradually in other countries—hence, the eventual name change to "Worldwide Church of God."

After Armstrong moved his operations to California, he founded Ambassador College in 1947. The college began acquiring lavish mansions on Orange Grove Blvd. in Pasadena, culminating in the acquisition of the Hulett C. Merritt mansion, formerly belonging to an iron ore mining magnate, in the late 1950s. Hulett Merritt was the chairman of US Steel and made his millions on the Mesabi Iron Range in Minnesota. Hulett Merritt's estate "Villa Merritt Ollivier" in Pasadena was built on four acres for $1,100,000 during 1905–08. This area on South Orange Grove Avenue was referred to locally as "Millionaires' Row", per the City of Pasadena's Architectural and Historical Survey of 1997. Mr. Merritt's mansion was at 99 Terrace Drive, bounded on the north by Olcott Place and on the west by South Orange Grove Avenue. After Hulett Sr.'s death in January 1956, the property was purchased by Herbert W. Armstrong from Hulett's four surviving grandchildren in October 1956, because it was adjacent to Ambassador College. Villa Merritt Ollivier was renamed "Ambassador Hall", and Ambassador College subsequently obtained permission to close Terrace Drive. Thereafter, the residence and street address for the former Villa Merritt Ollivier was renamed Ambassador Hall, 100 S. Orange Grove Blvd., Pasadena.

This mansion, with a sunken Italian garden, a rosewood-paneled room, and a basement swimming pool, became the campus centerpiece until the Auditorium was built. The college built two modern classroom buildings flanking Ambassador Hall, and the formal Italian sunken garden, with a plaza in the center, joined the three buildings and the garden into an academic center. Hulett Sr.'s former mansion was featured as the opening scene in the old TV show The Millionaire, looking upward from the tree-lined steps towards the hill with the mansion and towering palms above. The Pasadena 1997 Architectural Survey stated at Page 2.1–33: "The Hulett C. Merritt' House is significant as the residence of one of Pasadena's most celebrated millionaires and foremost residents of South Orange Grove Blvd."

The college was designed to prepare youth for life and service in the church. In the earliest days of Ambassador, male students frequently graduated into the ministry of the church. By the 1970s, that occurred less often. As the church grew in membership in the 1960s and 1970s, a smaller and smaller proportion of applicants could be accepted, some applicants having to wait years for acceptance.

The motto of the college was Recapturing True Values. Although most students of the college were associated with the church, it was not a strict requirement. Nonetheless, the students and faculty were primarily those with church affiliation.

Throughout most of its history, Ambassador operated under state approval or its international equivalent. Regional accreditation was not sought, primarily because it required that the college have a functioning board that was separate and distinct from the church's administration. Armstrong resisted this requirement, apparently concerned that such a separation would result in the truth of God, as he believed it to be and taught it, being watered down at an Ambassador that would become increasingly secular. He held this opinion despite the fact that numerous accredited colleges and universities around the country were operated by the Catholic Church, The Church of Jesus Christ of Latter-day Saints, and other Christian denominations without those organizations being required to alter church teachings.

The final phase of Ambassador began in the late 1970s and was characterized by constant uncertainty and indecision. The Ambassador campus at Bricket Wood, Hertfordshire, England, was closed in 1974, as operating funds were deemed necessary for other functions of the Worldwide Church of God. For similar reasons, the Texas campus was shuttered in 1977, and all students who wished to be were offered the opportunity to transfer to the original campus in Pasadena, California. In the interim, the decision had been made by church leadership to pursue regional accreditation in California. However, in 1978 President Garner Ted Armstrong, son of college founder Herbert Armstrong, announced that everything would be moving back to the Texas campus, with the California facility becoming a graduate school. Within months, however, the younger Armstrong was ousted from all positions in the church and college owing to an unrelated scandal, and Herbert Armstrong, recovered from a heart attack, announced that Ambassador was closing its doors altogether.

That stance was softened just as quickly, however, and the decision was made to continue operating Ambassador as a scaled-down academic institution more in line with a bible college. Beginning in August 1978, new incoming students were offered a one-year course ("Diploma in Biblical Studies"), with graduation thereafter, on September 4, 1979. Eventually, Ambassador returned to full four-year status, operating with state approval, but still without regional accreditation. Accreditation was something Armstrong did not agree with.

In 1981, Herbert Armstrong decided to reopen the Texas campus, which was still owned by the church. In 1985 he decided to close that campus again. In January 1986 Armstrong died, and his successor as church leader, Joseph W. Tkach, decided to keep the Texas campus open.

The roller coaster of closings and openings was possible only because Ambassador was not regionally accredited. State approval to grant degrees (a requirement in most states, including California and Texas) is all that had been sought by the institution.

However, the dynamics of higher education in the United States soon began to have an effect on independent, unaccredited colleges like Ambassador. For many years, regional accreditation was not required for colleges to open in various states—only state approval was needed. By the late 1980s, however, many states began to require that a college, after having operated for a certain number of years, would have to either move from state approval to regional accreditation or be closed. Ambassador was at a crossroads, in that it had to seek regional accreditation or be reduced to a bible college offering diplomas rather than recognized degrees or else close its doors for good.

The board of regents of Ambassador, still consisting of members of the Worldwide Church of God, decided to merge all operations at one location and seek regional accreditation. The decision was made to separate the college from the church's base of operations in California and move all college operations to the Big Sandy, Texas, campus. The California college closed permanently in 1990. Students at the Pasadena campus and many faculty members who were pursuing advanced degrees were transferred to the Big Sandy campus, which was in the midst of a construction boom to accommodate the influx of new personnel and to support the regional accreditation efforts.

Seal of Ambassador University

Ambassador College at Big Sandy, Texas, began the process of applying for regional accreditation from the Southern Association of Colleges and Schools. Accreditation was granted in 1994. That same year the college underwent a name change to Ambassador University. This new period of transformation was short-lived, however. For decades Ambassador did not have an endowment fund separate from the church. School officials had begun the process of establishing the first dedicated operating endowment in Ambassador's history, but there was not sufficient time to build the endowment. Doctrinal controversy within the Worldwide Church of God led to numerous splits and church spinoffs, and the resulting decrease in membership and contributions to the church led to a rapid decline in the annual financial subsidy the church had historically provided to the university. In December 1996 the university's board of regents voted to close the institution once and for all. In May 1997, with the university having just concluded its 50th anniversary year, Ambassador closed its doors. However, the Ambassador College legacy lived on in the form of Grace Communion Seminary (an educational institution affiliated with Grace Communion International (GCI), a member of the National Association of Evangelicals). Grace Communion Seminary is a business name of Ambassador College (AC), and a California non-profit religious corporation with federal 501(c)(3) status, founded in 1947 at Pasadena, California, as a church-related liberal arts college. In 1990 AC transferred its student body to an affiliated campus in Texas. In 2003 Ambassador College, doing business as Ambassador College of Christian Ministry, began offering courses online in areas of biblical studies, theology, and Christian ministry, providing a diploma and a graduate program. Since 2005 the diploma program, under the name of Ambassador College of Christian Ministry, has continued as a GCI training program in Christian ministry, administered under the auspices of the GCI affiliate in Australia at www.ambascol.org. Grace Communion Seminary, administered from Glendora, California, limits its educational programs to graduate level courses in pastoral ministry. All programs are open to academically qualified men and women who desire to expand their education in biblical studies and theology and their service in pastoral ministry in the evangelical tradition.

== Pasadena campus (1947–1990) ==
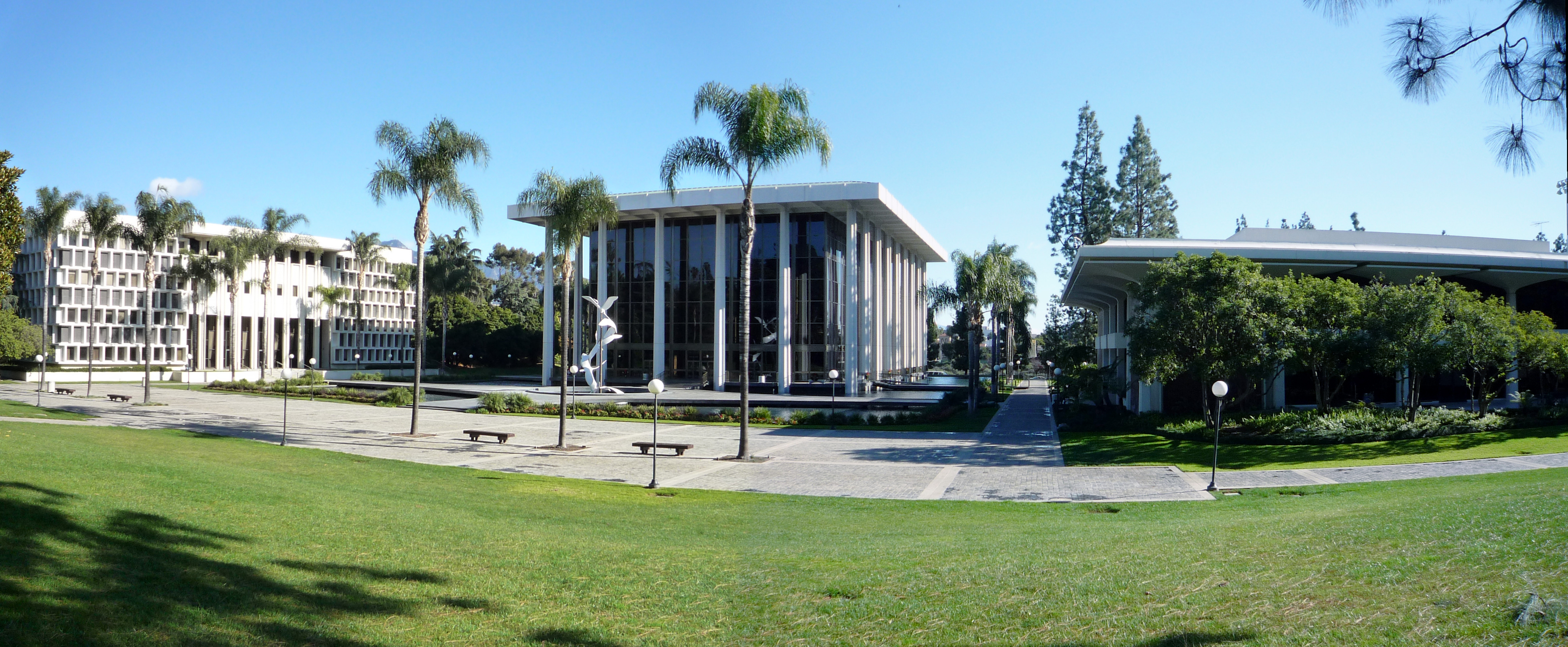
The Ambassador Auditorium and surrounding buildings, December 2008. The site is now owned by Harvest Rock Church of Pasadena, CA. The building on the left has since been demolished and turned into luxury condominiums. The building on the right is leased by Maranatha High School

Aside from being the identified sponsor of The World Tomorrow radio broadcast for a time (although the costs for the broadcast were paid by the church), the college in Pasadena became locally well known for its Ambassador Auditorium worship and concert venue, which for 20 years was host to many renowned artists from classical music to jazz. The concert series closed in 1995. The auditorium was largely unused for a decade until a portion of the Ambassador campus was sold to interdenominational Maranatha High School and a smaller portion, including the auditorium, to HRock Church.

In September 2006, the Pasadena City Council approved the redevelopment of the remaining Ambassador campus space into the "Westgate Pasadena" complex, a large mixed-use development consisting of 820 condos and apartments as well as 22,000 square feet (2,000 m^{2}) of commercial space. In June 2008, a large portion of a related project on the other side of the freeway was foreclosed. The Westgate project was unaffected.

In the Fall of 2010, TBS released the Glory Daze about 1980s college life which was filmed in the buildings and on the campus of the former Ambassador College in Pasadena. In 2013, TBS released the reality show King of the Nerds, also filmed on the campus.

The former Fine Arts and Science buildings were demolished in 2013 with the Hall of Administration following suit in early 2016.

== Bricket Wood, UK campus (1960–1974) ==
The Bricket Wood campus operated for 14 years at Hanstead House, a few miles north of London. The estate had belonged to Annie Henrietta Yule and her daughter Gladys, who used it for their Arabian horse breeding farm, the Hanstead Stud. The college operated in the house and grounds for fourteen years. Leading administrators on the campus included Ernest L. Martin, Roderick C. Meredith, Ronald L. Dart, and Raymond F. McNair.

It closed in 1974, and was sold shortly thereafter to the Central Electricity Generating Board. It was used as a management training facility, first by CEGB and then HSBC, closing in 2011. It is currently being developed for housing.

== Big Sandy, Texas campus (1964–1977, 1981–1997) ==
The history of the Big Sandy campus can be divided into seven periods:

1. Its use by the Radio Church of God as a festival center for the Feast of Tabernacles, a local church congregation site, and Imperial Schools campus (1952–1974),
2. The initial period that the campus was open as a four-year college, 1964–1977,
3. The period in which the college was closed but continued to be used as a church meeting site, 1977–1981,
4. The reopening of the facility as a two-year junior college, 1981–1989,
5. The return of the facility as a four-year college (as a consolidated campus), 1989–1997,
6. Its closure in 1997, after which it remained vacant until it was sold in 2001 to the Green Family Trust of Oklahoma City (owners of Hobby Lobby stores), and
7. Its sale (or donation) in 2001 to the Institute in Basic Life Principles, which opened it as the training facility for its International ALERT Academy; the organization later relocated its headquarters from the Chicago area to the facility.

The Big Sandy campus opened in the fall of 1964. Since the early 1950s, the campus had been used as a location for the annual Feast of Tabernacles. The campus closed in the fall of 1977, with students and faculty transferred to the Pasadena campus.

During the period from 1977 to 1981, the campus was used as a feast site and was used by the local congregation of the Worldwide Church of God. After several near sales of the property, the decision was made to reopen in the fall of 1981.

For a while, the Big Sandy campus included an organic farm, consistent with the college's emphasis upon personal health and bodily purity.

When the campus reopened, it initially served as a two-year junior college, with students having the opportunity to apply to transfer to Pasadena after two years. In the fall of 1989, the campus returned to a four-year format.

In the fall of 1990, students and staff from Pasadena were transferred, as plans were underway to seek accreditation. Numerous buildings were constructed almost overnight, including five dormitories, an administration building, a music building and lecture hall, and an office building. Accreditation was achieved in the summer of 1994. However, doctrinal division began to occur a year later in December 1995, ultimately leading to the closure of the campus in 1997.

The campus now serves as the headquarters of the Institute in Basic Life Principles and several of its umbrella ministries, and was used to accommodate refugees from Hurricane Katrina in the fall of 2005. The campus golf course, renamed Embassy Hills Golf Course, is now open to the public.

== AICF – Ambassador International Cultural Foundation ==
Ambassador College also sponsored archaeological excavations in Israel. Together with a related Ambassador International Cultural Foundation it sponsored both the Ambassador Auditorium concert series and many appearances by Herbert Armstrong in the company of world statesmen and women. The two organizations also jointly sponsored educational projects in Thailand, Sri Lanka, Nepal and Jordan.

Armstrong International Cultural Foundation is a non-profit, humanitarian organization sponsored by the Philadelphia Church of God and headquartered on the Herbert W. Armstrong College campus in Edmond, Oklahoma.

The two-pronged concept behind all of the foundation's goals and activities is: 1) that man is a unique being, possessing vast mental, physical and spiritual potentials—the development of which should be aided and encouraged, and 2) that it is the responsibility of all men to attend to and care for the needs of their fellow men, a precept professed by the vast majority of religions of the world—appropriately summed up in three biblical words: “Love thy neighbor.”

The foundation has sponsored several activities in Jerusalem. In 2006, the foundation began supplying volunteers and aid to Dr. Eilat Mazar's ground-breaking excavation of King David's palace in Jerusalem. It has also helped refurbish Liberty Bell Park in the heart of the city, a project Herbert W. Armstrong had started

== Successor institutions ==
Several Ambassador graduates and former administrators have led efforts to replicate the school in other settings.

When Ambassador closed in 1997, the Worldwide Church of God established the Ambassador Center at Azusa Pacific University. This later gave way to the online Ambassador College of Christian Ministry, which was headed by Ambassador's last president, Russell K. Duke. The graduate program was given then name Grace Communion Seminary. Russell Duke was the president until 2015; Gary W. Deddo was the president until December 2021. Michael Morrison is now the President.

Former WCG minister Gerald Flurry established Imperial College in Edmond, Oklahoma, based a great deal on the Ambassador model. To avoid confusion with Imperial College of London, the school is now Herbert W. Armstrong College. One of the campus landmarks is a rock considered to have been used by Herbert W. Armstrong as a "prayer rock" when he lived in Oregon. The campus' Armstrong Auditorium features two Baccarat candelabra purchased from Ambassador Auditorium in Pasadena in 2004, and a bronze swan sculpture (Swans in Flight by Sir David Wynne) purchased from the Big Sandy campus in 2009. In 2015, a second HWAC campus was opened at Edstone, U.K., near Stratford-Upon-Avon.

The United Church of God established the Ambassador Bible College in Milford, Ohio. The program is not accredited.

Garner Ted Armstrong, president of Ambassador from 1975 to 1978, established Imperial Academy in Tyler, Texas. However, student enrollment was quite small and the program is now defunct.

Roderick C. Meredith established the online Living University in the fall of 2007. The university is based at the Living Church of God's headquarters in Charlotte, North Carolina. The chief executive officer is Dr. Michael P. Germano, former vice president of academic affairs at Ambassador.

== Notable alumnus ==
- Garner Ted Armstrong
