= Herbert W. Armstrong =

American evangelist (1892–1986)

- Armstrong in the mid-1970s
- Born: July 31, 1892; Des Moines, Iowa, U.S.
- Died: January 16, 1986 (aged 93); Pasadena, California, U.S.
- Resting place: Altadena, California, U.S.
- Occupations: Evangelist; Author
- Known for: Radio evangelism; Founding the Worldwide Church of God
- Title: Pastor General of the Worldwide Church of God (1946–1986)
- Successor: Joseph W. Tkach
- Spouses: Loma Dillon (m. 1917–1967) (her death): Ramona Martin (1977–1984, divorced)
- Children: 4 with Loma (including Garner Ted)
- Relatives: Dwight L. Armstrong (1904–1984), brother

Herbert W. Armstrong (July 31, 1892 – January 16, 1986) was an American evangelist who founded the Worldwide Church of God (WCG). An early pioneer of radio and television evangelism, Armstrong preached what he claimed was the comprehensive combination of doctrines in the entire Bible, in the light of the New Covenant scriptures, which he maintained to be the restored true Gospel. These doctrines and teachings have been referred to as Armstrongism by non-adherents.

Armstrong's teachings required observance of parts of the Mosaic Law including seventh-day Sabbath, dietary prohibitions, and the covenant law "Holy Days". He also proclaimed that behind contemporary world events loomed various Biblical prophecies, interpreted in light of British Israelism. As founder and head of the Ambassador International Cultural Foundation, Armstrong and his advisers met with heads of governments in various nations, for which he described himself as an "ambassador without portfolio for world peace."

== Early life ==
Herbert Armstrong was born on July 31, 1892, in Des Moines, Iowa, into a Quaker family, the son of Eva (Wright) and Horace Elon Armstrong. He regularly attended the services and the Sunday school of First Friends Church in Des Moines. At age 18, on the advice of an uncle, he decided to take a job in the want-ad department of a Des Moines newspaper, the Daily Capital. His early career in the print advertising industry which followed had a strong impact on his future ministry and would shape his communication style.

On a trip back home in 1917, he met Loma Dillon, a school teacher and distant cousin from nearby Motor, Iowa. They married on his 25th birthday, July 31, 1917, and returned to live in Chicago.

Within a month or two after their marriage, (the US had entered World War I on April 6) Loma had an unusual dream or vision. She was with Herbert, at a road intersection, where she saw in the sky, a banner of dazzling stars, appearing then vanishing twice-over. She was happy, but sad for others, and thought she was witnessing Christ's return. Angels then flew to them and said that Christ was not coming then, but would be "coming very soon". Saying that God was giving them an "important work" to do, preparing the way before Christ's second coming. At the time, Herbert was not at all religious and it was only in later years that he came to believe that the vision "really was a message from God."

On May 9, 1918, they had their first child, Beverly Lucile, and on July 7, 1920, a second daughter, Dorothy Jane. In 1924, after several business setbacks, Armstrong and family moved to Eugene, Oregon where his parents lived at the time. While living in Oregon, they had two sons, Richard David (born October 13, 1928) and Garner Ted (born February 9, 1930). Armstrong continued in the advertising business despite the setbacks.

== Beginnings of ministry ==
During their stay in Oregon, his wife, Loma, became acquainted with a member of the Church of God (Seventh Day), Emma Runcorn. Emma and her husband O.J. were lay leaders in the Oregon conference of the Church of God, Seventh Day, a seventh-day-keeping Adventist group that rejected the authority of Ellen G. White and her teachings.

Loma became persuaded that the Bible taught Sabbath observance on Saturday, the seventh day, one of the beliefs of that church. Her assertion of this to her husband was met with dismay and appeared to him to be "religious fanaticism. She challenged him to find biblical support for Sunday observance. As his business was struggling against larger competitors, Armstrong had the time to take up this challenge. He began what would become a lifelong habit of intensive, lengthy Bible study sessions. He soon felt God was inspiring this, opening his mind to truths that historical Christian churches had not found or accepted. Shortly after, as related in his autobiography, Armstrong would take up a similar study on the topic of evolution of the species after a conflict with his sister-in-law. His studies on Sabbath and evolution convinced him that his wife was right, and that the theory of evolution was false.

He was eventually baptized, along with his brother Dwight L. Armstrong, in the summer of 1927 by Dr. Dean, the non-Sabbatarian pastor of Hinson Memorial Baptist Church in Portland, Oregon. It is unknown, however, if he ever joined this denomination. He would later recollect over four decades later that he believed, "On being baptized I knew God then and there gave me HIS HOLY SPIRIT!" Despite his own unique teaching on baptism his own account is noteworthy for the absence of any mention of the process of laying on of hands or a special prayer in the dispensation of the Holy Spirit, which were considered fundamental for membership in the Worldwide Church of God and reason for many a new convert's rebaptism.

In 1931 Armstrong became an ordained minister of the Oregon Conference of the Church of God (Seventh Day). The existence and history of this church became a significant factor in Armstrong's later beliefs.

While a member of The Church of God (Seventh Day), Armstrong became acquainted with ministers John Kiesz and Israel Hager who began to suspect that Herbert was a little too arrogant and tended to go against church doctrine. They cited Armstrong's refusal to submit to the Church of God ministers to be baptized but went out to a local Baptist minister instead as a point. After his ordination, Armstrong allied himself with two other rogue ministers by the names of Andrew N. Dugger and C. O. Dodd, both of whom had written a book called A History of the True Religion, from 33 AD to Date, in which they claimed that the New Testament Church of the first century had secretly descended through history and eventually became the Sabbath-keeping Church of God (Seventh Day). Dugger also predicted that the apocalypse would occur in 1936. Eventually, this led to Dugger and Dodd's ouster and when they promised to make Armstrong an apostle in their new church, The Church of God (Seventh Day), he joined with them.

After severing ties with the Church of God (Seventh Day) as the result of doctrinal disputes, he began to teach a form of British Israelism, which would later make up his book The United States and Britain in Prophecy. His ministerial credentials with Dugger's church were revoked in 1938. This, Armstrong believed, indicated God was now directing him in leading a revived work into the next "church era."

== Radio and publishing ==
In October 1933, a small 100-watt radio station in Eugene, Oregon, KORE, offered free time to Armstrong for a morning devotional, a 15-minute time slot shared by other local ministers. After positive responses from listeners, the station owner let Armstrong start a new program of his own. On the first Sunday in 1934, the Radio Church of God first aired. These broadcasts eventually became known as The World Tomorrow of the future Worldwide Church of God. Shortly thereafter, in February 1934, Armstrong began the publication of The Plain Truth, which started out as a church bulletin. It was at this time that Armstrong began to make prophetic claims and among them were the claims that Hitler and Mussolini were the prophesied Beast and False Prophet of the Book of Revelation who would deceive the nations for a short time just before the return of Jesus Christ. This piqued the interest of his audience. The broadcast expanded to other cities, and in 1942 began to be broadcast nationwide from WHO of Des Moines Iowa, a 50,000-watt superstation.

Critics point to statements in his early writings that proved to be inaccurate. For example, a statement from a lead article in the February 1939 edition of The Plain Truth, about a coming world war, said this:

By way of brief review of previous articles, and radio messages, notice, first, that this war will involve ALL nations. It will be the first real world war. Secondly, it will center around Jerusalem....And thirdly, this war will END with the Second Coming of Christ!

From his new contacts in Los Angeles, Armstrong began to realize the potential for reaching a much larger audience. He searched for a suitable location and chose Pasadena, California, as being ideal as it was a conservative residential community. During this time, Armstrong also reflected on starting a college to aid the growing church, by teaching and training young men and women. Hence, in 1946 Armstrong moved his headquarters from Eugene to Pasadena and on March 3, 1946, the Radio Church of God was officially incorporated within the state of California. He purchased a lavish mansion on Millionaires Row just off of the Rose Parade route on Orange Grove Boulevard, quickly acquired his own printing plant, and was broadcasting internationally in prime-time radio time slots. On October 8, 1947, his new college, Ambassador College opened its doors with four students.

== International expansion ==
During the 1950s and 1960s, the church continued to expand and the radio program was broadcast in England, Australia, the Philippines, Latin America, and Africa. In 1953, The World Tomorrow began to air on Radio Luxembourg, making it possible to hear the program throughout much of Europe. The beginning of the European broadcast provides the context of a booklet published in 1956 called 1975 in Prophecy! In this book Armstrong put forward a controversial vision of what the world could look like by 1975—featuring vivid illustrations by noted comics artist Basil Wolverton of mass burials and tidal waves destroying cities. Overall he thought that World War III and Christ's glorious return were at the doorstep and that world peace and utopia would follow. Armstrong believed that God had exciting plans for mankind that would see the end of such wars—though the message went far beyond an earthly utopia.

Several books and booklets focused on the key events that would signal the imminence of Christ's return, and taught of a specific end-time prophecy to be fulfilled, manifested in the form of European peacekeeping forces surrounding Jerusalem, at which time God's Church would be taken to a place of protection, or "place of safety"—possibly Petra in Jordan. World War III was predicted to be triggered by a "United States of Europe" led by Germany which would destroy both the United States and the United Kingdom. From the place of safety they would continue the work and prepare to help Christ establish Utopia upon His return.

In 1952, Armstrong published Does God Heal Today?, which provided the details on his doctrine on healing and his ban on doctors. Among his tenets were that only God heals and that medical science is of pagan origin and is ineffective. He believed that most illnesses were caused by faulty diet and that doctors should prescribe proper diet rather than medicine. He taught that members are not to go to doctors for healing but must trust in divine healing alone. This was his teaching despite his father's death in 1933 after "an all-night vigil of prayer." This teaching has been the cause of much controversy as individuals influenced by such teachings came to die.

The book The United States and Britain in Prophecy was published in 1954. It became the most well-known and requested church publication, with over six million copies distributed. In this book, Armstrong makes the claim that the peoples of the United States, the British Commonwealth nations, and the nations of Northwestern Europe are descendants of the Ten Lost Tribes of Israel. This belief, called British Israelism, formed the central basis of the theology of the Worldwide Church of God.

Franz Josef Strauss, a major politician in post-WWII Germany, became the target of the broadcasting and publishing media blitz that Armstrong unleashed upon Europe through the daily offshore pirate radio station broadcasts by his son Garner Ted Armstrong, The Plain Truth, and the Ambassador College campus at Bricket Wood in Hertfordshire, England. Strauss was portrayed as being the coming Führer who would lead a United States of Europe into a prophetic World War III against the U.S. and U.K. at some time between 1972 and 1975, and emerge victorious. In 1971, Strauss played along with the prophetic interest shown in him, as Herbert W. Armstrong recalled in a 1983 letter: "I entertained him at dinner in my home in Pasadena, and he spoke to the faculty and students of Ambassador College. I have maintained contact with him." Strauss appeared in an interview on The World Tomorrow television program.

The volume of literature requests for material written by Armstrong continued to grow during the 1960s and 1970s, and the literature was translated into several languages and distributed to a worldwide audience. They were distributed for free "as a public service." The Plain Truth magazine continued to be published and circulated, eventually reaching a monthly press run of eight million.

On April 15, 1967, Armstrong's wife Loma died, three and a half months before their 50th anniversary. Before she died he sent a co-worker a letter that has often been criticized for its harsh tone to "failing" members and for its calls for more money.

== Worldwide Church of God ==
On January 5, 1968, the Radio Church of God was renamed the Worldwide Church of God. Shortly before, the church began to broadcast a television version of The World Tomorrow. The program would eventually expand to 382 U.S. television stations, and 36 television outlets internationally, dwarfing televangelists Jerry Falwell, Jimmy Swaggart, Oral Roberts, and Jim Bakker. By this time, Garner Ted Armstrong, the son of Herbert W. Armstrong, was the voice and face of the program. It was speculated that with his charisma and personality, he was the logical successor to Armstrong, but doctrinal disagreements and widespread reports of extramarital sex led to his suspension in 1972. After initially changing his behavior he returned, but these issues resurfaced, coupled with his challenging his father's authority as Pastor General, resulting in him being permanently "disfellowshipped" (the church's term for excommunication) in 1978.

== Ambassador International Cultural Foundation ==
With the assistance of church accountant and adviser Stanley Rader, Armstrong created the Ambassador International Cultural Foundation in 1975. The foundation was funded by the church. The foundation's efforts reached into several continents, providing staffing and funds to fight illiteracy, to create schools for the disabled, to set up mobile schools, and for several archaeological digs of biblically significant sites. These humanitarian projects led to Armstrong receiving a series of invitations to meet with prominent heads of state, including (among others) Margaret Thatcher, Emperor Hirohito of Japan, King Hussein of Jordan, and Indira Gandhi. Armstrong was also internationally recognized as Ambassador for World Peace.

== Final years ==
In 1977, Armstrong, a widower in his 80s, married Ramona Martin, then 38, a long-time member and church secretary who had a 15-year-old son from a previous marriage. The controversial marriage would last for only a few years. The Armstrongs separated in 1982, with Herbert Armstrong returning to live in Pasadena full-time, and the marriage finally ended in divorce in 1984. During pre-trial proceedings in the divorce case, Armstrong's lawyers had sought to limit evidence of "prior incestuous conduct with his daughter for many years," but his wife's attorneys said "it was crucial since the church leader alleged Mrs. Armstrong had breached an agreement of love and fidelity."

In his latter years, Armstrong stated that he did not know whether or not Christ would return in his lifetime but did know, based on the sequence of events in the Bible, that the Lord's return was approaching. He had long written of his belief that the primary sign to look for would be some sort of dissolving of the Eastern Bloc alliance under Soviet control, followed by those nations' subsequent incorporation into an eastern leg of a United States of Europe. In August 1985, Armstrong's final work, Mystery of the Ages, was published. He wrote that "time may prove this to be the most important book written in almost 1,900 years" and called it a "synopsis of the Bible in the most plain and understandable language." It was more or less a compendium of theological concepts, as articulated by Armstrong, which included the notion that God deliberately coded the bible "so that it would not be understood until our modern time".

In September 1985, with his failing health widely known, Armstrong delivered his final sermon on the Feast of Trumpets in the Ambassador Auditorium. He spent his final days confined at his home on the college campus in Pasadena, California, on South Orange Grove Boulevard.

Almost until his final days, there was uncertainty about who would succeed Armstrong in the event of his death. The church's Advisory Council of Elders, acting on a clause in church by-laws added in 1981, was to select a successor after his death, yet Armstrong reportedly worried about the ramifications if certain individuals were selected, such as his son Garner Ted or evangelist Roderick Meredith. Finally, Armstrong opted to select the next Pastor General personally. Armstrong told the Church's Advisory Council of Elders of his decision to appoint evangelist-rank minister Joseph W. Tkach on January 7, 1986. Tkach had worked closely with former church executive Stanley R. Rader prior to Rader's retirement from active service with the Church, and had been ordained to the ministerial rank of evangelist along with Rader and Ellis LaRavia in 1979.

Armstrong died shortly before 6:00 a.m. on January 16, 1986, only nine days after naming Tkach as his successor. He was 93. Approximately 4,000 people attended his funeral, including a number of political figures from other countries. He was buried in Altadena's Mountain View Cemetery, between Loma and his mother, Eva Wright Armstrong. Evangelist Herman L. Hoeh, a long-time church member and one of the first graduates of Ambassador College, officiated at the graveside service, and Tkach gave the closing prayer.

In the years after his death in 1986, WCG leaders came to the conclusion that many of Armstrong's theological arguments were not biblical, causing the church to reject his teachings as "aberrant" and to completely rewrite its doctrines. The vastly changed organization has come into full agreement with the statement of faith of the National Association of Evangelicals. In April 2009, in light of the major doctrinal shifts made, the church also changed its name to Grace Communion International (GCI) to better reflect its new teachings.

== Theology and teachings ==
- Worldwide Church of God (WCG) members viewed Herbert W. Armstrong as having the Church rank of "apostle". Armstrong taught that God works only through "one man at a time" and that he was God's selected representative on earth.
- Armstrong taught a form of Sabbatarianism, explaining that; by creating the Sabbath (on the seventh day of creation, through resting – not working) God "HALLOWED the seventh-day of every week (Ex. 20:11)" and therefore made "future TIME holy!" Resting on the Sabbath day is thus commanded for all mankind and should be kept holy from Friday sunset to sunset on Saturday. The Worldwide Church of God conducted its worship Services during that period, accordingly, on Saturdays. Armstrong further explained that Christ is "Lord of the Sabbath" (Mt. 12:8) for it is He who 'made' it for mankind, thus it is a "blessing... to be ENJOYED, to spiritually REFRESH, in blessed fellowship and communion with CHRIST!" He believed that the observance of Sunday as the "Lord's Day" was a papal and/or satanic corruption introduced without authority from God or the Bible.
- Armstrong adhered to a form of British Israelism which stated that the British, American and many European peoples were descended from the so-called Ten Lost Tribes of Israel, using this belief to state that biblical references to Israel, Jacob, etc., were in fact prophecies relating to the modern day, with literal application to the US, Britain, and the British Commonwealth. In the course of this teaching, he also accepted the concept of an Assyrian-German connection and often made identifications of other nations in "Bible prophecy", such as Russia and China.
- As a result of this, Armstrong believed that a unified Europe (identified by him as a "revived Roman Empire" and as the first-mentioned "beast" of Revelation 13) would oppose Jesus at his second coming in the battle at Armageddon. Furthermore, he stated repeatedly that a unified Europe would have previously defeated and enslaved the American and British peoples. He often pointed to the European "Common Market" or European Community as its precursor, but tended to refer to it as "a kind of United States of Europe." Splinter groups who were previously members of the Worldwide Church of God usually identify the European Union as the unified Europe to which Armstrong devoted much writing.
- Armstrong taught that God's purpose in creating mankind was to "reproduce Himself", and that the process of being "born again" was not instantaneous — that the believer (as a result of baptism by immersion) was only "begotten" until reborn as a spirit being at the return of Jesus. These "begotten" believers were referred to as being "firstfruits" of a divine harvest and "true Christians" of the existing age. The birth of those spiritually "begotten" occurring at the time of Christ's return, at the "first resurrection." As Christ is "the FIRST born from the dead" (Col. 1:18), Armstrong concluded that many other "sons" (begotten by God's Spirit) would also be brought "to glory" (Heb. 2:10) at that "first resurrection" (Rev. 20:5). Those 'begotten' will then be instantaneously 'born anew' (John 3:3) but not again, "a second time", as "perishable" flesh and blood mortals (1 Cor. 15:53) but as "imperishable", immortal Spirit 'God' beings. He concluded that; "Until the resurrection, therefore, we cannot see, enter into or inherit the Kingdom of God. WE CANNOT BE BORN AGAIN UNTIL THE RESURRECTION!"
- Armstrong preached that Jesus Christ will return to earth to "rescue" humanity from the brink of self-annihilation, resulting in the establishment of "God's government" upon earth, during a 'Millennium' period, under the rulership of Christ and first-resurrected saints. After His return, those surviving the "great tribulation" will be given the chance to voluntarily accept "God's way of life." Christ is in heaven "until" the "times of restitution" (Acts 3:19–21) when God's government, world peace and utopian conditions shall be restored to this earth.
- Armstrong did not accept the concept of eternal judgment in this life. He believed that those who die as unbelievers prior to the return of Christ, exist in a state of "unconsciousness" (see Soul sleep) until after the 'Millennium' at the second resurrection, during which they will be offered the choice to submit to God's government. All those incorrigibly wicked, those who refuse to accept God's government and laws being judged guilty of rebellion against God to rise in a third resurrection, & thrown into 'Gehenna' fire. Including persons who had committed the "unpardonable sin". Such persons suffering eternal death. Armstrong identified such as being the "second death" mentioned in the Book of Revelation.
- In Armstrong's view, the scourging of Jesus prior to crucifixion "paid the penalty" for physical disease and sickness, allowing the option of divine healing. The crucifixion itself was considered to be the act which enabled God to allow humanity into the three-tiered resurrection scheme, as Jesus had paid the initial death penalty for breaking the Law.
- Armstrong did not accept Trinitarianism, believing it to be a doctrine of satanic authorship as part of a "counterfeit Christianity" (which he identified as the Roman Catholic Church). Armstrong taught that the Father and the Word were co-eternal, but that the Holy Spirit was not an actual person. He believed that the Holy Spirit was part of God's essence, a power emanating from him that suffused all creation, and especially believers, and through which God was omnipresent and able to act at all places and at all times.
- Because of his teachings identifying both the primacy of Sabbath and the "identity of modern Israel", Armstrong would come to accept that the Mosaic Law had not been "done away." Although he excluded certain segments he regarded as "already fulfilled", "ceremonial" or otherwise unfit, he taught adherence to the Levitical food regulations and the observance of the "Holy Days" of the Mosaic Law. The Worldwide Church of God taught seven 'Festivals of God' (Passover, Days of Unleavened Bread, Pentecost, Feast of Trumpets, Day of Atonement, Feast of Tabernacles, Last Great Day) and regarded such to be 'worship' days including Sukkot or "Feast of Tabernacles." The latter was practiced by setting up church "conventions" in various cities worldwide to which their various congregations had to attend, leaving homes and booking into hotel-type accommodation. For many, this eight-day festival was a 'highlight' of the year.
- As part of a larger paradigm in which common observances were often discarded, Armstrong rejected traditional holidays such as Christmas, Easter, Halloween and the celebration of birthdays, stating that all of these were of pagan origin. A similar principle extended also to the display of crosses and depictions of Jesus.
- Armstrong placed much emphasis on faith in God for healing and taught against the medical practice, except in the case of "repair" (setting of broken bones, cleansing of wounds, etc.). Medical intervention was consequently frowned-upon, there were consequently numerous controversial incidents involving death of members or member's children due to lack of medical attention. Armstrong spoke highly of principles of good diet (outside of the Levitical food regulations) and proper living, and members of the Worldwide Church of God as a result tended to gravitate towards whole grains, home-grown vegetables etc., although such acts were not an express tenet of faith.
- Armstrong taught against fornication, masturbation, adultery, homosexuality, and other practices he viewed as aberrations, authoring the book God Speaks Out On The 'New Morality (later retitled The Missing Dimension in Sex) on the subject. As a result of this fundamentalist view on morality, he also taught against the use of cosmetics, long hair on men, and other matters of personal appearance.
- Armstrong and the Worldwide Church of God viewed Revelation 2 and 3, (which contains seven messages to seven churches in Asia Minor at the time of its writing), to also be descriptive of seven "church eras" to pass, in chronological order. He stated that the "Sardis" era ended with his severance from the Church of God (Seventh-Day) and that the "Philadelphia" era officially began in October 1933. "Laodicea" would follow wherein lukewarmness would be the "dominant Church attitude at the end." His great concern was that they, "undoubtedly of the Philadelphia era", were "in serious danger of BECOMING also the Laodicean era." He apparently modified such era teaching from an earlier version preached by a previous Church of God, Seventh Day minister, G. G. Rupert. This concept has assumed greater importance among WCG splinter groups, as those that practice Armstrong's teachings tend to view the modern Worldwide Church of God (and sometimes other splinter groups) as "Laodicean" or entirely Protestant.
- Armstrong instituted a three-tiered annual tithing process for his followers. The first tithe (10% of member's gross household income) went to the Worldwide Church of God organization, which viewed itself as the "Melchizedek priesthood" with Jesus Christ as the High Priest with the rank of Melchizedek, which priesthood superseded the Levitical priesthood, and thereby entitled to support by tithes. The second tithe (a second 10% of member's gross household income) was saved by members and used as individual support during the "Feast of Tabernacles." The third tithe (a third 10% of members gross household income), which was paid every three years per member, was used to support widows and other members in need. The church did not overtly solicit funds from outside but did accept donations from "co-workers" and commonly sent "co-worker" letters that often called for money to be sent.

== Criticism and controversy ==
Armstrong's teachings and the church he created have been the subject of much criticism and controversy. Armstrong's theology and teachings are defended by his followers, but face criticism from ex-followers and the greater Christian community. Common points of criticism and controversy include:

=== Theological ===
- Salvation: Armstrong believed that repentance, faith and the indwelling of God's Holy Spirit enables true and full obedience to God's law, but stressed that keeping God's law (and repentance upon having sinned) is a requirement for salvation. Critics state that Armstrong taught salvation as being legalistic obedience to God's law, including such laws as Sabbath keeping, dietary laws, and other laws kept by Ancient Israelites but not typically kept by 'mainstream' Christian denominations.
- The Covenants: Armstrong taught that the New Covenant is an 'amplification' of the Old Covenant, and that certain laws (excluding temple and unenforceable ancient civil laws) from the Old Covenant are still in effect for Christians. This included laws such as literal Sabbath keeping, 'Clean and Unclean' meats and Holy Day observances. He believed that the New Covenant was yet future, to be finalized as a marriage covenant between Christ and the Church and that Christians currently existed 'between' the two Covenants. Critics say that Armstrong confused the two Covenants and selectively picked which aspects of the two Covenants to keep.
- Gospel of the Kingdom: Armstrong taught that a reason for Jesus Christ's presence on earth was to proclaim the Gospel message of a literal Kingdom of God that will be established on earth at Christ's 'second coming', and that the message of the Kingdom should be the focus of the gospel rather than the person of Christ. Critics indicate that this represents a diminishment of the person and importance of Christ, through whom salvation is attained, and that this represents a flawed understanding about the nature of the Kingdom. Armstrong taught that – the gospel "of" Christ – began to change to – a gospel "about" Christ – around twenty to thirty years after the founding of the Church in 31 A.D. He made the extraordinary claim that the gospel Christ brought (of the Kingdom) had "not been proclaimed to the world" for about 1,900 years "until the first week in 1953" when he began preaching it again on Radio Luxembourg.
- Prophetic predictions: Proponents believe that Herbert Armstrong was inspired by God and had the gift to understand prophecy. They believe that many of his predictions were inspired. Armstrong was considered gifted with spiritual understanding also and that, through him, God was revealing the true meaning of parts of the Bible which, till his time, had remained locked or sealed (so could not be correctly understood). That desire for understanding had been with Armstrong since he was a small boy, "always wanting to know 'why?' or 'how?' That obsession for understanding was to have a great influence on founding the Plain Truth magazine and Ambassador College in later years." According to critics, Armstrong's predictions were rife with speculation and remain mostly unfulfilled.
- British Israelism: Armstrong taught a form of British Israelism, which is the belief that those of Western European descent, notably England (Ephraim) and the United States (Manasseh), are direct descendants of the ancient northern Kingdom of Israel. This theory is inconsistent with the findings of modern research on the genetic history of Jews. It is commonly criticized for poor standards of research, and general inconsistency with archeological, anthropological and linguistic research.

=== Personality, personal conduct, and governance ===
Armstrong was often criticized for having lived in extravagant wealth in comparison to a few church members. Personal luxuries enjoyed by Armstrong included a personal jet, the finest clothing, furniture and other conveniences.

=== Teachings inferred from the Bible ===
Armstrong taught that the observance of principles that he believed could be inferred from biblical intent. Examples of these teachings include:

- Women were not allowed to wear makeup because it was believed that this was not pleasing to God. Armstrong stated

God's Church, the now imminent Bride of Christ, is not going to rise to meet the returning Christ in the air with painted faces and plucked and repainted eyebrows! How cleverly, without our suspecting it, did Satan influence leading ministers to derail the Church in many ways!...Now JESUS CHRIST, through His chosen apostle, is going to RULE on this question once and for all!...How did it get into our mid-and-latter 20th century society? FROM PROSTITUTES!...Women do not use makeup to PLEASE GOD today – for I can tell you ON HIS AUTHORITY it is NOT pleasing to HIM!

- The use of medicine and doctors was discouraged because members were expected to place their faith in God for healing. Armstrong stated:

Here's God's instruction to YOU, today, if you are ill. If we are to live by every Word of God, we should obey this Scripture. God does not say call your family physician...He does not say, call the doctors and let them give medicines and drugs, and God will cause the medicines and drugs and dope to cure you.... Instead God says call GOD'S MINISTERS. And let them PRAY, anointing with oil (the type and symbol of the Holy Spirit). Then GOD PROMISES He will HEAL YOU!

- Various members suffered discomfort and even death due to reluctance to resort to medical help, yet Armstrong made use of doctors and medicine later in his life.
- Author and literature professor Jerald Walker, who grew up in Armstrong's church, wrote about Armstrong's views that segregation was to be enforced on earth as it was expected to be enforced in heaven. In Armstrong's view, black people were to serve white people.
- Divorce was strongly discouraged. At times this was strictly enforced by requiring members that had previously divorced and remarried to divorce their new spouses so that they were not "living in adultery". Armstrong acknowledged that this belief caused significant hardship for many members but argued that this hardship was the consequent result of the earlier 'sin of divorce'. This policy was changed by Armstrong at a later time. Interracial marriage was also discouraged as Armstrong emphasized requirements for Ancient Israelites (who, according to British Israelism, became Western Europeans) to remain racially and religiously separate from other nations.
- As the Bible teaches that "the body is the temple of God's Spirit," Armstrong believed that it should therefore be kept in good health and presented in a manner glorifying to Christ. Members were consequently expected to conform to strict dress codes. Long hair and piercings were not allowed for men, whereas makeup and short hair were frowned upon for women. Members were expected to dress conservatively and modestly, and required to do so for church. Smoking was considered to be a spiritual sin and was grounds for a minister to refuse baptism. Critics contend that these requirements base salvation on the 'teachings of men' rather than the grace of God or the instructions of the Bible.
- Armstrong concluded that a third resurrection would take place, in which the incorrigibly wicked and those who had been converted (baptized members of WCG) but had 'fallen away' (left WCG) and who also had not repented in the "Great Tribulation" would be resurrected and sentenced to eternal death in the 'lake of fire.' Critics reject this interpretation.

== Honors ==
- Order of the Sacred Treasure, from the Japanese government
- King Albert I A watch (one of four specially commissioned by King Albert, after the armistice, to be made from an iron cannonball), presented by His Majesty Leopold III of Belgium in November 1970, for most significant contribution toward world peace; Armstrong was also a founding board member of the King Leopold III Foundation for the Conservation of Nature
- Presidential Merit Medal, presented by President Marcos of the Philippines in 1983 in the Manila Presidential Palace
- Commander of Our Most Noble Order of the Crown of Thailand
- The Cross of Constantine, presented by the Patriarch of Jerusalem Diodoras in 1982 in Jerusalem
- Honorary Doctorates in Humanities from both Iloilo University and Angeles University in the Philippines
- Herbert W. Armstrong Professor of Constitutional Law Emeritus from the University of Southern California (1983)

== Bibliography ==
- — (1985). Mystery of the Ages. New York: Dodd, Mead. ISBN 978-0-396-08773-1.
- Pagan Holidays—or God's Holy Days—Which?
- Proof of the Bible
- — (1976). Which Day Is the Christian Sabbath?. Pasadena, CA: The Worldwide Church of God. p. 44.
- The Incredible Human Potential
- The Missing Dimension in Sex
- The Seven Laws of Success
- The United States and Britain in Prophecy
- The Wonderful World Tomorrow
- What Is Faith?
- What Science Can't Discover About the Human Mind
- Who or What Is the Prophetic Beast?
- Why Marriage – Soon Obsolete?
- Armstrong, Herbert W. (1967). Autobiography of Herbert W. Armstrong. Vol. 1. Ambassador College Press.
- Armstrong, Herbert W. Autobiography of Herbert W. Armstrong. Vol. 2.

== See also ==
- Grace Communion International
- Assyria-Germany connection
- Philadelphia Church of God and its affiliated organizations named after Armstrong

== Further reading and video resources ==
=== Pro-Armstrong ===
- "The World Tomorrow starring Herbert W. Armstrong"
- Herbert W. Armstrong Searchable Library His writings before they were edited by the Philadelphia Church of God which now owns the copyrights to some of his works.
- Herbert W Armstrong Library & Archive
- Herbert W. Armstrong Compendium

=== Anti-Armstrong ===
- Transformed by Truth: The Worldwide Church of God Rejects the Teachings of Founder Herbert W. Armstrong and Embraces Historic Christianity
- The Painful Truth. A collection of Facts, Opinions and Comments from survivors of Herbert W. Armstrong, Garner Ted Armstrong, The Worldwide Church of God and its Daughters.
- Feazell, J. Michael (2003). The liberation of the World Wide Church of God. Grand Rapids, Michigan, US: Zondervan. ISBN 978-0-310-23858-4.
- Morris, Jan (1973). The Preachers. New York: St. Martin's Press.

Religious titles
Preceded by founder	Pastor General of the Worldwide Church of God; 1946–1986	Succeeded by Joseph W. Tkach
