= The Plain Truth =

US magazine

- The Plain Truth (August 1969)
- Categories: Religious and general magazine
- Frequency: Monthly
- First issue: February 1934
- Final issue: 1986
- Company: The Worldwide Church of God
- Country: United States
- Language: English (also published many language issues)

The Plain Truth was a free-of-charge monthly magazine, first published in 1934 by Herbert W. Armstrong, founder of The Radio Church of God, which he later named The Worldwide Church of God (WCG). The magazine, subtitled as The Plain Truth: a magazine of understanding, gradually developed into an international, free-of-charge news magazine, sponsored by the WCG church membership. The magazine's messages often centered on the pseudo-scientific doctrine of British Israelism, the belief that the early inhabitants of the British Isles, and hence their descendants, were actually descendants of the Ten Lost Tribes of Israel.

By 1986, The Plain Truth was published in seven languages. The magazine's monthly circulation was roughly 8.2 million; in contrast, Time magazine's 1986 monthly circulation was 5.9 million.

After Armstrong's death in 1986, new WCG leadership sought to change the core principles of WCG doctrine, quashed publication of Armstrong's writings, sold off most of the church's holdings, and began offering magazine subscriptions for sale. WCG leadership eventually changed the name of the organization and embraced positions closer to those of mainstream Protestantism.

After Joseph W. Tkach took over, leading to a major doctrinal transformation of the Worldwide Church of God, the circulation of The Plain Truth, distributed free by subscription and via newsstand distribution around the globe, fell from a peak of 8 million to less than 100,000 before it switched to a paid subscription status. Eventually the magazine was spun off into a separate, independent, evangelical ministry as Plain Truth Ministries.

== Plain Truth Ministries ==
With The Plain Truth being ceded to Plain Truth Ministries, the traditional magazine has changed its format and replaced by two distinct publications:

- Plain Truth dropping "The" from the title. It is an 8-page online publication in a newsletter format published 6 times annually (once every two months), with issues in January, March, May, July, September and November of each year. Digital copies are available to subscribers.
- CWR magazine (standing for Christianity without the Religion magazine). It is a 16-page publication in magazine format, published 6 times annually (once every two months), with issues in February, April, June, August, October and December of each year. Printed hard copies are sent by mail as per subscription.

Plain Truth Ministries also publishes a monthly newsletter CWR/PTM Monthly Letter, a CWR Blog, a Daily Radio Show, a Weekly Audio Teaching Ministry.
