= Grace Communion International =

Formerly the Worldwide Church of God

Grace Communion International (GCI), formerly named the Radio Church of God (RCG) and the Worldwide Church of God (WCG), is a Christian denomination based in Charlotte, North Carolina, and founded by Herbert W. Armstrong.

The organization's website reports 30,000 members spanning 550 churches in 70 countries. It is structured in the episcopal model and is a member of the National Association of Evangelicals.

== Founding ==
In 1934, Herbert W. Armstrong, an advertising agent turned radio and televangelist, founded the Radio Church of God—a radio ministry in Eugene, Oregon. According to Armstrong's biography, he was ordained in 1931 by the Oregon Conference of the Church of God (Seventh Day), an Adventist group, but he split from them in 1933.

According to the church, his first broadcast was in October 1933. On January 7, 1934, Armstrong began hosting his weekly The World Tomorrow show on a local 100-watt radio station KORE in Eugene. The program was formatted like a condensed church service, featuring hymns and Armstrong's message. The name of the program was likely inspired by the theme of the 1939 World's Fair, "The World of Tomorrow".

The church filed for incorporation on March 3, 1946, as the Radio Church of God. In 1947 the church was incorporated, and its headquarters were relocated to Pasadena, California. The church then founded Ambassador College as the denomination's educational arm. The broadcast of The World Tomorrow went into Europe on Radio Luxembourg on January 7, 1953. In 1968, the church was renamed the Worldwide Church of God (WCG).

== Under Herbert W. Armstrong (1934–1986) ==
The Worldwide Church of God adhered to the teachings of its founder, Herbert W. Armstrong, until his death. Armstrong practiced a blend of Christian fundamentalism with some tenets of Judaism and Seventh-Day Sabbath doctrine. Armstrong preached that Britain and the United States were populated by descendants of two "lost tribes" of Ancient Israel. Armstrong's doctrine included strict observation of the Saturday Sabbath, annual festivals and holy days described in Leviticus Chapter 23; the distinction between the flesh of ritually clean and unclean animals listed in Leviticus Chapter 11; the forbidding of medical interventions, and the required payment of three tithes to the church. Armstrong rejected what he regarded as pagan practices and beliefs that had been absorbed into mainstream Christianity. These included the idea of the Holy Trinity, and the celebrations of Christmas, Easter, Halloween, and birthdays. Members were encouraged to follow a dress code during services. Armstrong's doctrine strictly opposed divorce and remarriage and encouraged members who had divorced to seek reconciliation with their former spouses, even if they had remarried.

Armstrong claimed that those "called" by God, who believed the gospel of the Kingdom, and received God's Spirit upon full-immersion baptism, became part of the true, biblical, 'Church of God'. Ministers were obligated to "disfellowship" any in their congregations who caused trouble or division. Such "disfellowshipments" were announced at services before the assembled congregation.

In 1956, Armstrong published 1975 in Prophecy!, a pamphlet that predicted catastrophic drought, famine, and epidemic disease in the United States between 1965 and 1972, as well as an upcoming nuclear world war instigated by underground German Nazis and the subsequent enslavement of Christians in Europe, concluding in the return of Jesus Christ. Armstrong predicted that these events would take place for three and a half years and would conclude by 1975. On January 5, 1968, the church was renamed the Worldwide Church of God.

By the mid-1950s, Armstrong had his son Garner Ted Armstrong take over as host of the radio and television versions of The World Tomorrow. By the late 1960s, Garner Ted was executive vice president of the church, vice-chancellor of Ambassador College (which by then had two more campuses in Texas and the United Kingdom), and executive editor of church publications including Tomorrow’s World, Good News, and The Plain Truth.

Armstrong's first wife, Loma Dillon Armstrong, died on April 15, 1967, after almost 50 years of marriage.

=== 1970s: Scandal and conflict ===
By the early 1970s, the church began to splinter. Members were disappointed that the events predicted by Herbert Armstrong had not occurred. Because church literature such as The Wonderful World Tomorrow, 1975 in Prophecy!, and many others had attempted to pinpoint the date of Christ's return, members continued to wait anxiously for the Second Coming. Some of Armstrong's evangelists, such as Gerald Waterhouse, had presented detailed, step-by-step accounts of the Second Coming in their sermons, which included Armstrong himself as one of two witnesses of the Book of Revelation.

In an article in the May 15, 1972, edition of Time magazine, Herbert Armstrong was reported to have ousted Garner Ted from his leadership roles in the church on the grounds that Garner Ted was "in the bonds of Satan." When questioned about the specifics of his accusation, Armstrong responded, "Look up 1st Timothy, Chapter 3, first five or six verses and Titus, Chapter 1, verse 6". The article surmised:

"Both passages make two points in common: that a bishop or church elder must be faithful to his wife and rule strictly over believing children. Had handsome Garner Ted succumbed to an old and common temptation? His father was cryptic: "The fault was spiritual, not moral."

In 1972, Armstrong declared Garner Ted repentant and named him the divinely ordained successor in the church after the latter signed a letter stating, "I have sinned against my wife, the children and the church", though neither specified what Garner Ted's transgression had been. While some congregants speculated adultery, others guessed that father and son had disagreed on the format of their radio and television programs, or on some tenets of the church, such as the Elder Armstrong's vocal support for racial segregation.

By March 1974, multiple ministers had quit or been ousted as dissidents, with several citing the church's unfairly lax response to Garner Ted's violations, denouncing elements of Armstrong's doctrine, and founding offshoot churches. Thirty-five ministers formed the Associated Church of God in Washington, D.C. Texas Minister Barry Chase, sent an open letter to church members signaling his departure, citing "monumental immorality in the highest echelons of this church."

Alfred Carozzo, former WCG director of ministers in the western U.S., sent an open letter to WCG members denouncing the church's tithe system, the Armstrongs' lavish lifestyle and expenditures, Armstrong's positions on divorce and remarriage, and alleging that Armstrong had treated Garner Ted leniently compared to church members accused of similar trespasses. Carozzo incorporated his own offshoot, the 20th Century Church of God. More departures followed, some retaining the Church of God component in their names based on Armstrong's assertion that this is the name God calls the Church in the Bible.

In 1977, Herbert Armstrong married Ramona Martin, a woman nearly fifty years his junior, and moved to Tucson, Arizona, while recovering from a heart attack. During this time, Armstrong administered and guided church affairs through Stanley Rader, the church's general counsel, and the church administration. The church continued to be headquartered in Pasadena. That year, six former students of Ambassador College published a pamphlet alleging that the church misused funds and violated church members' civil rights. The pamphlet asserted that the church's tithing system reduced members to poverty, costing up to 40% of their income, to support the Armstrongs' lavish lifestyle, including multiple homes, expensive cars, and a Gulfstream jet.

By 1978, Armstrong had disfellowshipped Garner Ted and ousted him from the church permanently. Garner Ted began his own church in 1978 in Tyler, Texas, called the Church of God International. Herbert and Garner Ted Armstrong remained estranged for the remainder of the elder Armstrong's life.

=== Ambassador International Cultural Foundation ===
During the 1960s, "Armstrong had sought to put into stronger action what he later termed God's way of give", which was said to include "the way of character, generosity, cultural enrichment, true education: of beautifying the environment and caring for fellow man." He began undertaking humanitarian projects in underprivileged locales around the world, which led to the creation of the church-run Ambassador International Cultural Foundation (AICF) in 1975. The Foundation worked in several countries, providing staffing and funds to fight illiteracy, create schools for disabled people, set up mobile schools, and conduct several archaeological digs at significant biblical sites. The church auditorium hosted, at highly subsidized ticket prices, hundreds of performances by noted artists such as Luciano Pavarotti, Vladimir Horowitz, Bing Crosby, Marcel Marceau, and Bob Hope.

The Quest periodical was published monthly by AICF from July 1977 to September 1981. Originally named Human Potential, the project was directed by Stanley Rader as a secular outreach of the church-funded AICF. Quest publishers hired a professional staff unrelated to the church to create a high-quality publication devoted to the humanities, travel, and the arts. The periodical was created in the aftermath of Armstrong's poorly received 1975 in Prophecy!, a publication which caused accusations of false prophecy to spread. (The use of the year 1975 was defended by church ministers as a device to explain biblical prophecy, by contrasting it with the scientific world's declaration of 1975 as the year of technological "Utopia"). The AICF became secular in its approach and thinking and the church began to cut back on its funding. Eventually it was discontinued by Armstrong, and its assets were sold to other interests.

=== Receivership crisis ===
Several members prompted the state of California to investigate charges of malfeasance by Rader and Herbert W. Armstrong. A coalition of six ex-ministers brought accusations of misappropriation of funds against Herbert W. Armstrong and Stanley Rader to the attorney general of California, contending that the two men were siphoning millions of dollars for their personal indulgences. In 1979, California Attorney General George Deukmejian placed the church campus in Pasadena into financial receivership for half a year.

The matter gained the attention of Mike Wallace who investigated the church in a report for 60 Minutes. Wallace alleged that there had been lavish secret expenditures, conflict of interest, insider deals, posh homes and lifestyles in the higher ranks, and the heavy involvement of Stanley Rader in financial manipulation. No legal charges were leveled against Herbert W. Armstrong, Stanley Rader, or the WCG. Wallace invited Rader to appear on 60 Minutes on April 15, 1979. Wallace showed Rader a secret tape recording in which Herbert Armstrong clearly stated to C. Wayne Cole, who was made temporary acting head of the church by Herbert Armstrong, that Rader was attempting to take over the church after Armstrong's death, reasoning that the donated tithe money was the incentive and quite a "magnet" to Stan Rader. Rader abruptly ended the interview. This tape was made during a conversation about Stanley Rader by Herbert W. Armstrong, and C. Wayne Cole. Wayne Cole gave the tape to 60 Minutes for use in its exposé of Rader. In the meantime, Herbert Armstrong switched the WCG Inc. corporations to "corporate sole" status, making him the sole officer and responsible party for the affairs of the corporations. All income, tithes and checks were then made payable to the personal name of Herbert W. Armstrong and sent to his home in Tucson, Arizona. In referring to the investigation of the California Attorney General, Rader wrote Against the Gates of Hell: The Threat to Religious Freedom in America in 1980, in which he contended that his fight with the Attorney General was solely about the government's circumventing religious freedoms rather than about abuse of public trust or fraudulent misappropriation of tithe funds.

The California Second Court of Appeals overturned the decision on procedural grounds and added as dicta, "We are of the opinion that the underlying action [i.e., the state-imposed receivership] and its attendant provisional remedy of receivership were from the inception constitutionally infirm and predestined to failure."

Stanley Rader left his positions within the church in 1981. While remaining a member, he left the public spotlight as an attorney, retired, but continued to receive payments from the WCG on his lifetime contract, $300,000 per year, until his death from acute pancreatic cancer on July 2, 2002.

=== Analysis of Armstrongism ===
Walter Martin, in his book The Kingdom of the Cults (1965), devoted 34 pages to the group, claiming that Armstrong borrowed freely from Seventh-day Adventist, Jehovah's Witnesses and Mormon doctrines. Armstrong said that all Church doctrine could be proven simply and effectively through the Bible.

== After Armstrong (1986–2009) ==
=== Armstrong's death and doctrinal changes ===
On January 16, 1986, Herbert Armstrong died in Pasadena, California. Shortly before his death, on January 7, Armstrong appointed Joseph W. Tkach Sr. to succeed him "... as pastor general, in the difficult times ahead". Joseph W. Tkach took on leadership of the denomination. Tkach and other ministers came to the conclusion that a great many of their doctrines were not biblical.

=== Changes under new leadership ===
As early as 1988, Joseph W. Tkach Sr. began to make doctrinal changes, at first quietly and slowly, but then openly and radically. The changes were presented as new understandings of Christmas and Easter, Babylon and the harlot, British Israelism, Saturday Sabbath, and other doctrines.

Tkach Sr. directed the church theology towards mainstream evangelical Christian belief, against the wishes of some of the membership. This caused much disillusionment among the membership and another rise of splinter groups. While the church admitted that its changes had brought about "catastrophic results", they stood by their belief that the changes were for the best. During the tenure of Joseph Tkach Sr., the church's membership declined by 80%.

All of Herbert Armstrong's writings were withdrawn from print by the WCG, though they are still made available by other denominations. In the 2004 video production Called To Be Free, former dean of WCG's Ambassador College Greg Albrecht, declared Herbert Armstrong to be both a false prophet and a heretic.

In 1995, Tkach Sr. died of cancer and his son, Joseph Tkach Jr., became the leader of the WCG. Tkach Jr. affirmed his father's reforms within the church, and continued to make changes. As a result, many members and ministers left and formed other churches that conformed to many of the teachings of Armstrong.

In 2009, the WCG changed its name to Grace Communion International. In October 2018, Joe Tkach Jr. retired and installed Greg Williams as the President of GCI.

== Contemporary beliefs and practices ==
=== Teachings ===
Much of GCI's current doctrine follows mainstream Protestant beliefs, professing that faith in Jesus is the only way to receive salvation and that the Bible is the divinely inspired and infallible word of God.

=== Women's ordination ===
In 2007, the WCG decided to allow women to serve as pastors and elders. This decision was reached after several years of study. In Pikeville, Kentucky, that same year, Debby Bailey became the first female elder in the WCG.

=== Name change to Grace Communion International ===
According to the organization's press release regarding their name change, the name Grace Communion International was chosen to "precisely describe" the denomination as "an international community, bound together by God's grace."

The name change was revealed in 2009 during a conference of over a thousand ministers and their spouses that had gathered from around the world. The theme of the conference was "Renewed in Christ" and reflected the importance of the changes that had occurred within the church. The new name for the church was seen to truly reflect the nature of the church as it had been transformed in past years. GCI felt that these changes had come about by pastors being led by the Holy Spirit with a close examination of scripture.

=== Grace Communion Seminary ===
Grace Communion Seminary (GCS) originated from Ambassador College. Classes are delivered in an online format. Accredited graduate programs include courses on the Bible, theology, church history, and ministry.

== Structure ==
=== International ===
Grace Communion International has a hierarchical polity. Its ecclesiastical policies are determined by the Advisory Council of Elders. Members of the Advisory Council are appointed by the President. The President, who also holds the title of Pastor General, is chief executive and ecclesiastical officer of the denomination. A Doctrinal Advisory Team may report to the Advisory Council on the church's official doctrinal statements, epistemology, or apologetics. The President may pocket veto doctrinal positions he determines to be heretical. However, the President is also a member of the Doctrinal Advisory Team, and so he is aware of and involved in the activities of that committee. Historically, Presidents, as chairmen of the board of directors, have appointed their own successor. This and the President's power to appoint and remove members of the Advisory Council have remained areas of concern even among those who applaud the church's doctrinal changes.

The Church maintains national offices and satellite offices in multiple countries. Membership and tithe income originate primarily from the eastern United States.

=== Regional and local ===
In the United States, denominational contact with local assemblies or local church home small group meetings, i.e., cell churches, is facilitated by district superintendents, each of whom is responsible for a large number of churches in a geographical region (such as Florida or the Northeast) or in a specialized language group (such as Spanish-speaking congregations).

Local churches are led by a senior pastor, pastoral leadership team (with one person designated as a congregational pastoral leader), each of which is supervised by a district pastoral leader. Some senior pastors are responsible for a single local church, but many are responsible for working in two or more churches. Salary compensation for the paid local church pastor, if available, is determined by the local church.

== Finances ==
The early WCG used a three-tithe system; under which members were expected to give a tithe or 10% "of their increase." A Bible passage typically interpreted as 10% of a family's income.

- The first tithe was 10% of a member's total income. These funds were sent to the church headquarters to finance "the work." That is the operation of the church and broadcasting of its message.
- The second tithe was funds saved by a member for their and their family's observance of the annual biblical feasts and holy days. Chiefly the eight day contiguous observance of the seven day Feast of Tabernacles and the one day Eighth Day of Assembly. This tithe was not paid to the church.
- The third tithe was paid to the church headquarters on the third and sixth years of a personal seven year tithing cycle. The church claims to have used the third tithe to support the indigent, widows, and orphans. Distribution was decided privately at the discretion of the ministry.

In contrast to many other churches' religious services, the WCG did not follow the practice of passing around offering plates every church service; instead reserving this practice for holy day church services. Instead of calling these tithes the church considered them "freewill offerings" and regarded them as entirely separate from regular tithes. The church also gathered funds in the form of donations from "co-workers". Those who read the church's free literature or watched the weekly TV show but did not attend services.

Under Joseph W. Tkach Sr., the three-tithe system became non-mandatory. It was suggested that tithes could be calculated on net, rather than gross, income. GCI headquarters were subsequently downsized. The denomination sold much of its property, including sites used for festivals, camps built for teenagers, college campuses, and private aircraft. They discontinued printing of all the books, booklets and magazines published by Armstrong.

The church sold its properties in Pasadena and purchased an office building in Glendora, California. That building was sold in 2018 and the home office was moved to Charlotte, North Carolina. Tithes were now being sent directly to the denomination. Formerly, members met in temporary locations such as public school buildings and dance halls. Under the new financial reporting system, local churches typically used the majority of funds locally for ministry, including buying or constructing permanent church buildings. About 15% of the tithes were going to the denominational office; depending on how the congregation was affiliated with the denomination.
