= Sabbath desecration =

Failure to observe the Biblical Sabbath

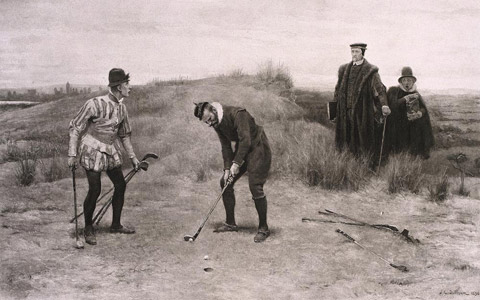
The Sabbath Breakers by J.C. Dollman (1896)

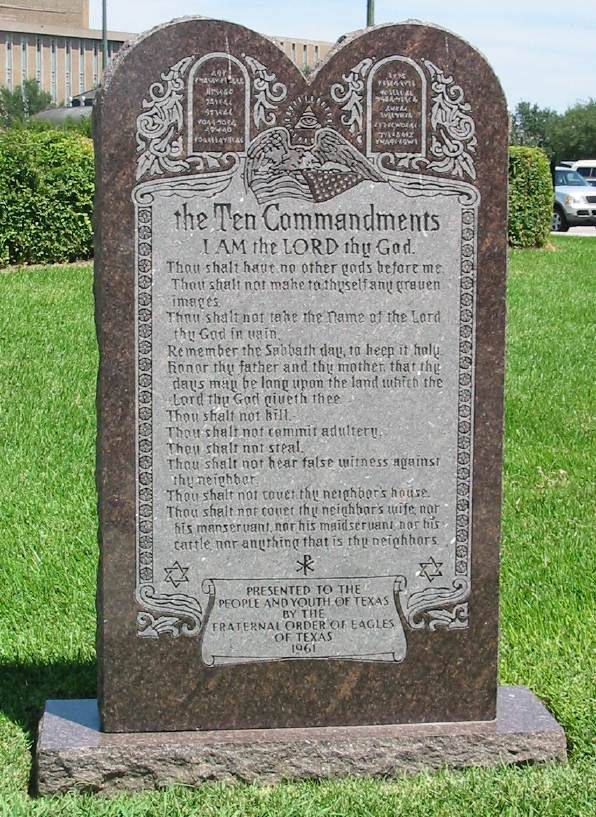
The Ten Commandments on a monument on the grounds of the Texas State Capitol. The fourth commandment listed is "Remember the Sabbath day, to keep it holy", see also Biblical law in Christianity.

Sabbath desecration is the failure to observe the Biblical Sabbath and is usually considered a sin in relation to either the Jewish Shabbat (Friday sunset to Saturday nightfall), the Sabbath in seventh-day churches, or to the Lord's Day (Sunday), which is recognized as the Christian Sabbath in first-day Sabbatarian denominations.

== Judaism ==
According to Mosaic Law, to desecrate shabbat intentionally, despite warning, is a capital offense (Exodus 31:14). All work was prohibited during shabbat, even minor tasks, such as "gathering wood" (Numbers 15:32-36). Since the decline of classical semicha (rabbinic ordination) in the 4th century C.E., the traditional Jewish view is that Jewish courts have lost the power to rule on criminal cases. As such, it would be practically impossible for Orthodox courts to enforce the death penalty in modern times, even if they had the political standing to do so. Talmudic protections for defendants make execution very difficult even by the Great Sanhedrin, e.g., requiring two competent witnesses to the shabbat violation and an official court warning prior to the violation. Some Reform and Conservative rabbis condemn capital punishment generally, partly based on this stringency.

There are 39 categories of activity prohibited on Shabbat, derived in the tractate Shabbat (Talmud) from the construction of the Biblical tabernacle. Halakha (Jewish law) derives many further forbidden acts from these categories (toledoth and shevuth), with varying severity, that may not be performed except for preventing severe illness or death. Unwarranted violation of any of these precepts is termed chillul shabbat ("profanation of shabbat"). People who consistently violate shabbat today are generally not considered reliable in certain matters of Jewish law.

== Christianity ==
Congregationalists, Presbyterians, Methodists, and Baptists, as well as many Episcopalians, have historically espoused the view of first-day Sabbatarianism, which teaches that the Lord's Day (Sunday) is the Christian Sabbath, in keeping with the understanding that the moral law contained in the Ten Commandments stands eternally.

In contrast, Seventh-day Sabbatarians believe that the Sabbath should be observed on Saturday, holding that it was not transferred from Saturday to Sunday. Other Christians do not observe the Sabbath or apply it to a "day of rest", believing that it is a part of the Mosaic Law that has no application to Christians.

=== Traditional application to Sunday ===
The traditional application of the Christian Sabbath to Sunday is based on the claim that the Sabbath was moved to the Lord's Day, the day that Jesus rose from the dead. First-day Sabbatarian (Sunday Sabbatarian) practices include attending morning and evening church services on Sundays, receiving catechesis in Sunday School on the Lord's Day, taking the Lord's Day off from servile labour, not eating at restaurants on Sundays, not Sunday shopping, not using public transportation on the Lord's Day, not participating in sporting events that are held on Sundays, as well as not viewing television and the internet on Sundays; Christians who are Sunday Sabbatarians often engage in works of mercy on the Lord's Day, such as evangelism, as well as visiting prisoners at jails and the sick at hospitals and nursing homes.

The Westminster Confession, held by Presbyterian Churches, teaches first-day Sabbatarianism:

As it is the law of nature, that, in general, a due proportion of time be set apart for the worship of God; so, in His Word, by a positive, moral, and perpetual commandment binding all men in all ages, He has particularly appointed one day in seven, for a Sabbath, to be kept holy unto him (Ex. 20:8, 20:10-11, Is. 56:2, 56:4, 56:6-7): which, from the beginning of the world to the resurrection of Christ, was the last day of the week: and, from the resurrection of Christ, was changed into the first day of the week (Ge. 2:2-3, 1 Cor. 16:1-2, Ac. 20:7), which, in Scripture, is called the Lord's Day (Rev. 1:10), and is to be continued to the end of the world, as the Christian Sabbath (Ex. 20:8, 20:10, Mt. 5:17). This Sabbath is to be kept holy unto the Lord when men, after a due preparing of their hearts, and ordering of their common affairs beforehand, do not only observe an holy rest all the day from their own works, words, and thoughts about their worldly employments and recreations (Ex. 20:8, 16:23, 16:25-26, 16:29-30, 31:15-17, Is. 58:13, Neh. 13:15-19, 13:21-22), but also are taken up the whole time in the public and private exercises of His worship, and in the duties of necessity and mercy (Is. 58:13).

This statement was adopted by the Congregationalist Churches, which are descended from the Puritans, in their Savoy Declaration. The 1689 Baptist Confession of Faith of the Reformed Baptists advances the same first-day Sabbatarian obligation of the Presbyterian's Westminster Confession and the Puritan Congregationalists' Savoy Declaration.

The General Rules of the Methodist Church similarly require "attending upon all the ordinances of God" including "the public worship of God" and prohibit "profaning the day of the Lord, either by doing ordinary work therein or by buying or selling".

==== Blue laws ====
The law in North Dakota at one time stated: "The fine for Sabbath-breaking is not less than one dollar or more than ten dollars for each offence." Other laws have been passed against Sabbath breaking, e.g., by the Puritans. First-day Sabbatarian organizations, such as the Lord's Day Alliance in North America, as well as the Lord's Day Observance Society in the British Isles, have mounted campaigns with support in both Canada and Britain from labour unions, with the goal of preventing secular and commercial interests from hampering freedom of worship and preventing them from exploiting workers.

=== Seventh-day churches, application to Saturday ===
Fundamental Belief # 20 of the Seventh-day Adventist Church states...

The beneficent Creator, after the six days of Creation, rested on the seventh day and instituted the Sabbath for all people as a memorial of Creation. The fourth commandment of God's law requires the observance of this seventh-day Sabbath as the day of rest, worship, and ministry in harmony with the teaching and practice of Jesus, the Lord of the Sabbath. The Sabbath is a day of delightful communion with God and one another. It is a symbol of our redemption in Christ, a sign of our sanctification, a token of our allegiance, and a foretaste of our eternal future in God's kingdom. The Sabbath is God's perpetual sign of His eternal covenant between Him and His people. Joyful observance of this holy time from evening to evening, sunset to sunset, is a celebration of God's creative and redemptive acts. (Gen. 2:1-3; Ex. 20:8-11; Luke 4:16; Isa. 56:5, 6; 58:13, 14; Matt. 12:1-12; Ex. 31:13-17; Eze. 20:12, 20; Deut. 5:12-15; Heb. 4:1-11; Lev. 23:32; Mark 1:32.)

— Seventh-day Adventist Fundamental Beliefs

== See also ==
- Lord's Day Observance Society
- Heresy
- Bible desecration
- Host desecration
- Shabbat
- Sabbath in Christianity
- Sabbath in seventh-day churches
- Biblical law in Christianity
- Plucking grain on Sabbath
- Holy day of obligation
