= Sabbatarianism (disambiguation) =

Sabbatarianism advocates the observation of the Sabbath in Christianity, in keeping with the Ten Commandments.

Sabbatarianism may also refer to:

- First-day Sabbatarianism, one of the following:
  - Puritan Sabbatarianism, historically the first Sabbatarians, who followed the Reformed practice of the avoidance of work and recreation on the first day of the week
  - Non-Sabbatarianism, general present-day Christian application of Sabbath principles to the first day of the week (Sunday)
- Seventh-day Sabbatarianism, Christian observance of Sabbath on the seventh day of the week (Saturday)
- Jewish Sabbatarianism, Jewish observance of Sabbath on the seventh day of the week
- Subbotniks, a Russian sect categorized as Jews or Judaizing Christians
- Szekler Sabbatarians, a Transylvanian and Hungarian Unitarian religious group
- Biblical Sabbatarianism, observance of Sabbath according to the Bible

== See also ==
- Sabbath in Christianity
