= Third Commandment =

The Third Commandment of the Ten Commandments could refer to:

- "Thou shalt not take the name of the Lord thy God in vain" under the Philonic division used by Hellenistic Jews, Greek Orthodox and Protestants except Lutherans, or the Talmudic division of the third-century Jewish Talmud.
- "Remember the Sabbath day, to keep it holy" under the Augustinian division used by Roman Catholics and Lutherans.
