= Sabbatarianism =

View within Christianity that advocates the observation of the Sabbath

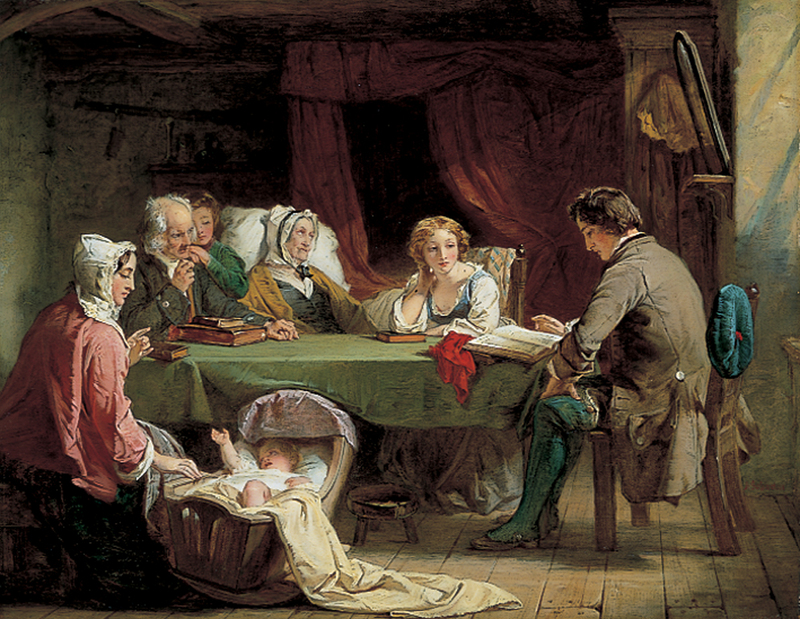
Sabbath Eve, painting by Alexander Johnston

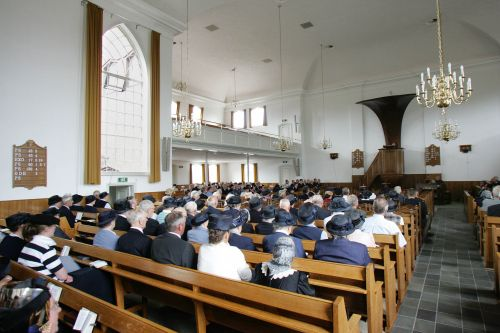
Christian denominations teaching first-day Sabbatarianism, such as the Free Presbyterian Church of Ulster, observe the Lord's Day as a day of worship and rest.

Sabbatarianism advocates the observation of the Sabbath in Christianity, in keeping with the Ten Commandments.

The observance of Sunday as a day of worship and rest is a form of first-day Sabbatarianism, a view which was historically heralded by nonconformist denominations, such as Congregationalists, Presbyterians, Methodists, Moravians, Quakers and Baptists, as well many Episcopalians. Among Sunday Sabbatarians (First-day Sabbatarians), observance of the Lord's Day often takes the form of attending the Sunday morning service of worship, receiving catechesis through Sunday School (often referred to as Sabbath school), performing acts of mercy (such as evangelism, visiting prisoners in jails and seeing the sick at hospitals), and attending the Sunday evening service of worship, as well as refraining from Sunday shopping, servile work, playing sports, viewing the television, and dining at restaurants. The impact of first-day Sabbatarianism on Western culture is manifested by practices such as Sunday blue laws.

Seventh-day Sabbatarianism is a movement that generally embraces a literal reading of the Sabbath commandment that provides for both worship and rest on Saturday, the seventh day of the week. Judaism has observed a sabbath on the seventh day since antiquity, following the creation account in Genesis 2 which unambiguously states that God blessed and sanctified the seventh day, having rested on the seventh day from all his creation which God had made to do. Seventh Day Baptists leave most other Sabbath considerations of observance to individual conscience. The Seventh-day Sabbatarian Adventists (Seventh-day Adventist Church, Davidian Seventh-day Adventists, Church of God (Seventh Day), and others) have similar views, but maintain the original, scriptural duration as Friday sunset through Saturday sunset. The Orthodox Tewahedo churches in Ethiopia and Eritrea observe the seventh-day Sabbath, as well as Sunday as the Lord's Day. Likewise, the Coptic Church, another Oriental Orthodox body, "stipulates that the seventh-day Sabbath, along with Sunday, be continuously regarded as a festal day for religious celebration."

Its historical origins lie in early Christianity, later in the Eastern Church and Irish Church, and then in Puritan Sabbatarianism, which delineated precepts for keeping Sunday—the Lord's Day—holy in observance of Sabbath commandment principles.

Non-Sabbatarianism is the view opposing all Sabbatarianism, declaring Christians to be free of mandates to follow such specific observances. It upholds the principle in Christian church doctrine that the church is not bound by such law or code, but is free to set in place and time such observances as uphold Sabbath principles according to its doctrine: to establish a day of rest, or not, and to establish a day of worship, or not, whether on Saturday or on Sunday or on some other day. It includes some nondenominational churches.

== History ==
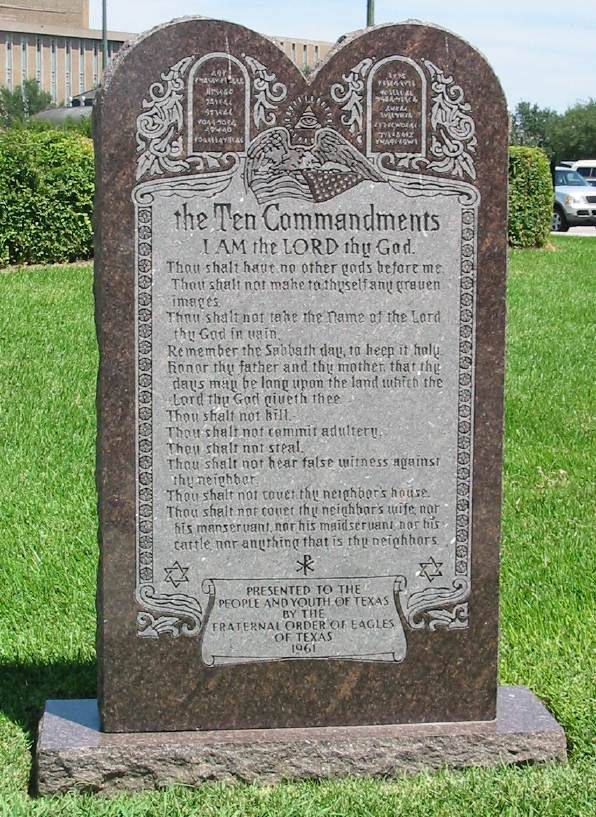
A monument of the Ten Commandments at the Texas State Capitol

=== Theological background ===
Most Christian churches, including the Roman Catholic Church, Methodist churches and Reformed churches, have traditionally held that law in the Old Covenant has three components: ceremonial, moral, and civil. They teach that while the ceremonial and civil (judicial) laws have been abolished, the moral law as contained in the Ten Commandments still continues to bind Christian believers. Among these Ten Commandments, which are believed by Jews and Christians to be written by the finger of God, is "Remember the sabbath day, to keep it holy."

According to the New Testament, after the resurrection of Jesus he appeared to his disciples on the first day of the week (Matthew 28:1, Mark 16:2, Luke 24:1, John 20:1–19), the Holy Spirit was sent to the Church on the first day of the week (Pentecost Sunday), the disciples celebrated the Eucharist and took up collections on the first day of the week (Acts 20:7, 1 Corinthians 16:1–2); in addition the first day of the week is referred to as the Lord's Day in Revelation 1:10—these findings, for Christians, served as the divine institution of the Lord's Day as a fulfillment of the Jewish Shabbat, a change that these Christians believed was foreshadowed in Isaiah 65:17.

The Apostolic Constitutions (ca. 380), in Section II, reveals that the early Church kept both the seventh-day Sabbath, observed on Saturday, as well as the Lord's Day, celebrated on the first-day (Sunday): "But keep the Sabbath, and the Lord’s day festival; because the former is the memorial of the creation, and the latter of the resurrection." Section VII reemphasizes this:

Be not careless of yourselves, neither deprive your Saviour of His own members, neither divide His body nor disperse His members, neither prefer the occasions of this life to the word of God; but assemble yourselves together every day, morning and evening, singing psalms and praying in the Lord’s house: in the morning saying the sixty-second Psalm, and in the evening the hundred and fortieth, but principally on the Sabbath-day. And on the day of our Lord’s resurrection, which is the Lord’s day, meet more diligently, sending praise to God that made the universe by Jesus, and sent Him to us, and condescended to let Him suffer, and raised Him from the dead. Otherwise what apology will he make to God who does not assemble on that day to hear the saving word concerning the resurrection, on which we pray thrice standing in memory of Him who arose in three days, in which is performed the reading of the prophets, the preaching of the Gospel, the oblation of the sacrifice, the gift of the holy food?

The Didache is commonly said to command believers to "Gather together each Sunday, break bread and give thanks, first confessing your sins, that your sacrifice may be pure," but the Didache never commands believers to assemble on a specific day. Unlike Didache 8, which explicitly names fasting days (δευτέρα and πέμπτη), chapter 14 simply reads κατὰ κυριακὴν δὲ κυρίου, which in context refers to the Lord's Eucharist or "the Lord's Thanksgiving," not "the Lord's Day." Some scholars argue that translating it as "the Lord's Day" reflects later Christian usage at the time the manuscript was transmitted rather than the immediate context of the passage. This also fits other early evidence that many churches gathered on both the Sabbath and the first day of the week, making it unlikely that the Didache intended to prescribe only one day of assembly, but per the Lord's inspiration. It was upheld in the fourth century by the ancient Church of the East, as well as in the sixth century by the Celtic churches. Gregory of Nyssa, a fourth century Church Father, implored the faithful to observe both the seventh-day Sabbath and the Lord's Day: "With what eyes do you regard the Lord's Day, you who have desecrated the Sabbath? Do you know that these two days are related, that if you wrong one of them, you will stumble against the other?" Nevertheless, Johann Lorenz von Mosheim stated that the practice of observing both the Hebrew Sabbath and the Lord's Day was principally observed in those congregations that were made up of Jewish converts to Christianity and gradually faded away; on the other hand, the observance of the Lord's Day was characteristic of all Christian assemblies.

=== Differences between Jewish and Christian observance ===
In distinguishing the observances performed on the Christian Sabbath from those performed on the Jewish Sabbath, Jonathan Edwards wrote:

We are taught by Christ, that the doing of alms and showing of mercy are proper works for the Sabbath-day. When the Pharisees found fault with Christ for suffering his disciples to pluck the ears of corn, and eat on the Sabbath, Christ corrects them with that saying, "I will have mercy and not sacrifice;" Mat. 12:7. And Christ teaches that works of mercy are proper to be done on the Sabbath, Luke 13:15, 16, and 14:5.

=== Views of Church Fathers and Reformers ===
As early as the second century, Irenaeus, who was a disciple of Polycarp, himself a disciple of John the Apostle, "On the Lord’s day every one of us Christians keep the Sabbath, meditating on the law, and rejoicing in the works of God." Writing in the fourth century, the early Church Father, Eusebius, taught that for Christians, "the sabbath had been transferred to Sunday". This view held by Eusebius, particularly his "interpretation of Psalm 91 (ca. 320) greatly influenced the ultimate transfer of sabbath assertions and prohibitions to the first day of the week." In "the fourth and fifth centuries theologians in the Eastern church were teaching the practical identity of the Jewish sabbath and the Christian Sunday." Saint Cæsarius of Arles (470-543) reiterated the view that "the whole glory of the Jewish Sabbath had been transferred onto Sunday, so that Christians had to keep it holy in the same way as the Jews had their own day of rest." The Council of Elvira, in AD 300, declared that individuals who failed to attend church for three Sundays in a row should be excommunicated until they repented of their sin. Tendencies towards Sabbatarianism began to resurface very early in the Reformation (early 16th century), causing some of the first Protestants, Luther and Calvin among them, to deny the need for legal codes and accept the non-Sabbatarian principles long established in Christianity.

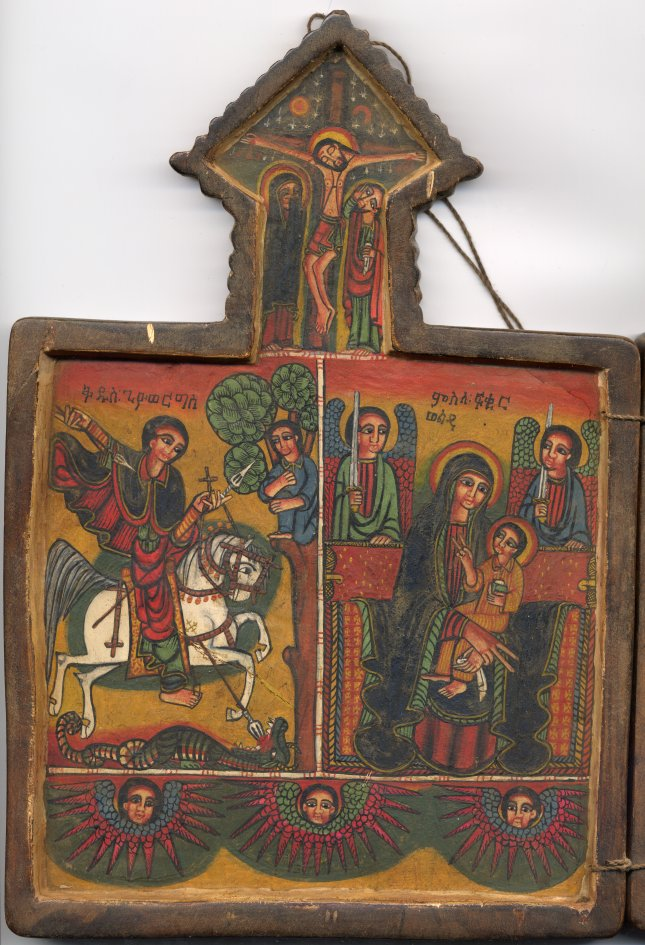
Ethiopian Orthodox icon depicting St. George, the Crucifixion, as well as the Madonna and Child

=== Observance of the Sabbath in Oriental Christianity ===
In Oriental Christianity, however, the Sabbath always retained importance, particularly leading to controversy within the Ethiopian Orthodox Tewahedo Church. In the fourteenth century, the monk Abba Ewostatewos and his supporters, mostly based in mountainous areas of northwest Ethiopia found themselves in controversy with southern monks over strict observance of the Sabbath; "the Sabbatarian controversy divided the kingdom during the fourteenth and fifteenth centuries." Zara Yaqob, the king, eventually "decreed that the Sabbatarian teaching of the northern monks become the position of the church". This "Sabbatarian" teaching was not the innovation of Ewostatewos but was based on the historic teaching of the Apostolic Constitutions and was not a controversy within the Coptic Orthodox Church up until that point. This observance is not considered a Judaizing practice, as the Confession of emperor Saint Gelawdewos summarizes: "we do not honour it as the Jews do... but we so honour it that we celebrate thereon the Eucharist and have love-feasts, even as our Fathers the Apostles have taught us in the Didascalia".

=== Observance of the Sabbath in Western Christianity ===
In the Roman Catholic Church, Church Councils and imperial edicts "sought to restrict various activities on this day Sunday, especially public amusements in the theater and circus." Abstention from sin, in the eyes of Saint Augustine of Hippo (354–430), meant Sabbath rest from servile work on Sunday.

Many Protestant denominations, such as the Presbyterian and Methodist churches, observe Sunday as the Christian Sabbath. The Presbyterian Church of Scotland promoted first-day Puritan Sabbatarian practices. In addition, first-day Sabbatarianism is historically heralded by nonconformist denominations, such as Congregationalists and Presbyterians, as well as Methodists and Baptists.

The essence of first-day Sabbatarianism, named for the Sabbath, is that it upholds the idea that Christians are bound to keep a specific code of conduct in relation to the principal day of Christian worship, or a day of rest, or both. The first-day, Puritan Sabbatarians constructed their code from their understanding of moral obligations following from their interpretation of "natural law", first defined in writings of Thomas Aquinas. Not seeking to re-establish Mosaic Law or Hebrew Sabbath practices, their connection to Judaizing was limited to the use of a legal code by which Christians might be judged.

With unwavering support by mainstream Christian denominations, Sabbatarian organizations were formed, such as the Lord's Day Alliance (founded as the American Sabbath Union) and the Sunday League of America, following the American Civil War, to preserve the importance of Sunday as the Christian Sabbath. Founded in 1888, the Lord's Day Alliance continues to state its mission as to "encourage all people to recognize and observe a day of Sabbath rest and to worship the risen Lord Jesus Christ, on the Lord’s Day, Sunday". The Board of Managers of the Lord's Day Alliance is composed of clergy and laity from Christian churches, including Baptist, Catholic, Episcopalian, Friends, Lutheran, Methodist, Non-Denominationalist, Orthodox, Presbyterian, and Reformed traditions. The Woman's Christian Temperance Union also supports first-day Sabbatarian views and worked to reflect these in the public sphere. In Canada, the Lord's Day Alliance (renamed the People for Sunday Association of Canada) was founded there and it lobbied successfully to pass in 1906 the Lord's Day Act, which was not repealed until 1985. A Roman Catholic Sunday league, the Ligue du Dimanche was formed in 1921 to promote first-day sabbatarian restrictions in Quebec, especially against movie theaters. Throughout their history, first-day Sabbatarian organizations, such as the Lord's Day Alliance, have mounted campaigns, with support in both Canada and Britain from labour unions, with the goals of preventing secular and commercial interests from hampering freedom of worship and preventing them from exploiting workers. In the nineteenth-century Australian colonies, the influence of first-day Sabbatarianism led to public condemnation and threats of government intervention against recreational activities, such as folk football, which were viewed as a disruption to Sunday divine services.

In the present day, 'First-day Sabbatarian' or 'Sunday Sabbatarian' is applied to those, such as the Presbyterian churches, who teach morning and evening Sunday worship, rest from servile labour, as well as honouring the Lord's Day by refraining from shopping on Sundays, as well as refraining from participating or viewing sporting events held on Sundays, in addition to performing works of mercy on the first day. Similarly, the common term "Christian Sabbath" is sometimes used to describe the fact that most Christians assemble in worship on Sunday, and may also consider it a day of rest, aligning with the Biblical norms of the Sabbath, and even the Puritans. The Roman Catholic Church, on the other hand, makes a clear distinction or separation between the Sabbath and Sunday, arguing that the Christian observance of the Lord's Day respects the moral law of Ten Commandments as it is a fulfillment of the Hebrew Sabbath, with only the ceremonial law changing the weekly day of worship from Saturday to Sunday. In the Catholic Church, the 1917 Code of Canon Law ¶1248 stipulated that "On feast days of precept, Mass is to be heard; there is an abstinence from servile work, legal acts, and likewise, unless there is a special indult or legitimate customs provide otherwise, from public trade, shopping, and other public buying and selling." Examples of servile works forbidden under this injunction include "plowing, sowing, harvesting, sewing, cobbling, tailoring, printing, masonry works" and "all works in mines and factories"; commercial activity, such as "marketing, fairs, buying and selling, public auctions, shopping in stores" is prohibited as well.

A minority of Western Christians, such as Seventh-day Adventists and Seventh Day Baptists, observe Saturday as the Sabbath.

== Sunday Sabbatarians ==
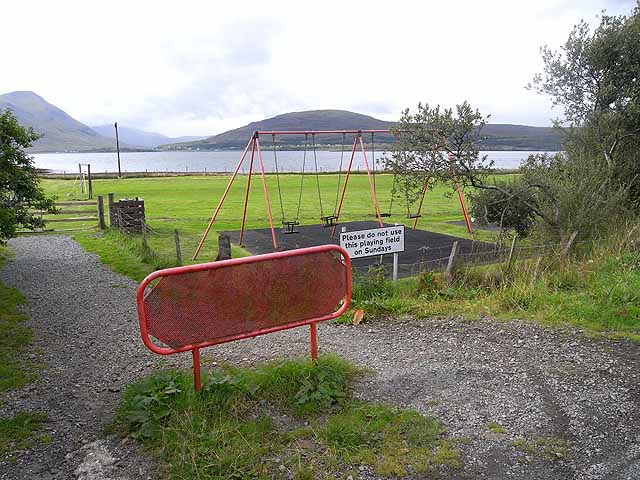
A recreation ground on Raasay displaying a sign that reads "Please do not use this playing field on Sundays"

First-day Sabbatarian (Sunday Sabbatarian) practices include attending morning and evening church services on Sundays, receiving catechesis in Sunday School on the Lord's Day, taking the Lord's Day off from servile labour, not eating at restaurants on Sundays, not Sunday shopping, not using public transportation on the Lord's Day, not participating in sporting events that are held on Sundays, as well as not viewing television and the internet on Sundays; Christians who are Sunday Sabbatarians often engage in works of mercy on the Lord's Day, such as evangelism, as well as visiting prisoners at jails and the sick at hospitals and nursing homes.

=== Reformed churches ===
The Puritans of England and Scotland brought a new rigour to the observance of the Christian Lord's Day, in reaction to the customary Sunday observance of the time, which they regarded as lax. They appealed to Sabbath ordinances with the idea that only the Bible can bind men's consciences in whether or how they will take a break from work, or to impose an obligation to meet at a particular time. Sunday Sabbatarianism is enshrined in its most mature expression, the Westminster Confession of Faith (1646), in the Calvinist theological tradition. Chapter 21, "Of Religious Worship, and the Sabbath Day", sections 7–8 read:

7. As it is the law of nature, that, in general, a due proportion of time be set apart for the worship of God; so, in his Word, by a positive, moral, and perpetual commandment binding all men in all ages, he hath particularly appointed one day in seven, for a Sabbath, to be kept holy unto him: which, from the beginning of the world to the resurrection of Christ, was the last day of the week; and, from the resurrection of Christ, was changed into the first day of the week, which, in Scripture, is called the Lord’s day, and is to be continued to the end of the world, as the Christian Sabbath.
8. This Sabbath is then kept holy unto the Lord, when men, after a due preparing of their hearts, and ordering of their common affairs beforehand, do not only observe a holy rest, all the day, from their own works, words, and thoughts about their worldly employments and recreations, but also are taken up, the whole time, in the public and private exercises of his worship, and in the duties of necessity and mercy.

The confession holds that not only is work forbidden in Sunday, but also "works, words, and thoughts" about "worldly employments and recreations." Instead, the whole day should be taken up with "public and private exercises of [one's] worship, and in the duties of necessity and mercy." Denominations that adhere to the Westminster Larger Catechism (1648), such as the Free Presbyterian Church of North America and the Netherlands Reformed Congregations, teach:

The sabbath or Lord’s day is to be sanctified by an holy resting all the day, not only from such works as are at all times sinful, but even from such worldly employments and recreations as are on other days lawful; and making it our delight to spend the whole time (except so much of it as is to betaken up in works of necessity and mercy) in the public and private exercises of God’s worship: and, to that end, we are to prepare our hearts, and with such foresight, diligence, and moderation, to dispose and seasonably dispatch our worldly business, that we may be the more free and fit for the duties of that day.

This statement was adopted by the Congregationalist churches, which are descended from the Puritans, in the Savoy Declaration. The Puritans' influential reasoning spread Sabbatarianism to other Protestant denominations, such as the Methodist churches for example, during the 17th and 18th centuries, making its way beyond the British Isles to the European continent and the New World. It is primarily through their influence that "Sabbath" has become the colloquial equivalent of "Lord's Day" or "Sunday".

Reformed Baptists, for example, uphold the 1689 Baptist Confession of Faith, which advanced the same first-day Sabbatarian obligation of the Puritan Congregationalists' Savoy Declaration.

Strict Sunday Sabbatarianism is sometimes called "Puritan Sabbath", and may be contrasted with "Continental Sabbath". The latter follows the continental reformed confessions, such as the Heidelberg Catechism, which emphasize rest and worship on the Lord's Day, but do not explicitly forbid recreational activities. However, in practice, many continental Reformed Christians also abstain from recreation on the Sabbath, following the admonition by the Heidelberg Catechism's author Zacharaias Ursinus that "To keep holy the Sabbath, is not to spend the day in slothfulness and idleness".

The evangelical awakening in the 19th century led to a greater concern for strict Sunday observance. In 1831, the founding of the Lord's Day Observance Society was influenced by the teaching of Daniel Wilson.

=== Moravian Church ===
The Moravian Covenant for Christian Living, which is the covenant taken by members of the Moravian Church, teaches:

16. Worship and Sunday Observance — Remembering that worship is one of our proper responses to Almighty God, an experience designed for our benefit, and a part of our Christian witness, we and our children will faithfully attend the worship services of the Church.
17. We, therefore, will be careful to avoid unnecessary labor on Sunday and plan that the recreations in which we engage on that day do not interfere with our own attendance or that of others at divine worship.

=== Schwarzenau Brethren churches ===
The Church Polity of the Dunkard Brethren Church, a Conservative Anabaptist denomination in the Schwarzenau Brethren tradition, teaches that "The First Day of the week is the Christian Sabbath and is to be kept as a day of rest and worship. (Matt. 28:1; Acts 20:7; John 20:1; Mark 16:2)"

=== Church of the United Brethren ===
The Church of the United Brethren in Christ, in its membership standards codified in the Book of Discipline, teaches in its position on the Lord’s Day Observance:

1. Following the example of the early disciples and New Testament church, everyone should make provision for exercises of devotion on Sunday, the Lord’s Day, and inasmuch as possible shall attend all services for hearing read the Word of God, singing spiritual songs and hymns, Christian fellowship, and giving of tithes and offerings (John 20:19, 1 Corinthians 16:2, Hebrews 10:25). 2. Members are admonished to neither buy nor sell needlessly on the Lord’s Day.

These standards expect the faithful to honour the Lord's Day by attending the morning service of worship and the evening service of worship on the Lord's Day, in addition to not engaging in Sunday trading.

=== Quakerism ===
The Richmond Declaration, a confession of faith held by the Orthodox branch of the Religious Society of Friends (Quakerism), teaches with regard to the First Day:

Whilst the remembrance of our Creator ought to be at all times present with the Christian, we would express our thankfulness to our Heavenly Father that He has been pleased to honor the setting apart of one day in seven for the purposes of holy rest, religious duties, and public worship; and we desire that all under our name may avail themselves of this great privilege as those who are called to be risen with Christ, and to seek those things that are above where He sitteth at the right hand of God. (Col 3:1) May the release thus granted from other occupations be diligently improved. On this day of the week especially ought the households of Friends to be assembled for the reading of the Scriptures and for waiting upon the Lord; and we trust that, in a Christianly wise economy of our time and strength, the engagements of the day may be so ordered as not to frustrate the gracious provision thus made for us by our Heavenly Father, or to shut out the opportunity either for public worship or for private retirement and devotional reading.

Various yearly meetings in the Orthodox branch of Quakerdom further discuss the importance of the First Day in their Book of Discipline. For example, the Central Yearly Meeting of Friends in its Manual of Faith and Practice teaches:

Jesus rose from the dead on the first day of the week (Matt. 28:1). This fact, and the fact that the Holy Spirit came at Pentecost on the first day of the week (Acts 2:1, where the name Pentecost means "fiftieth" and refers to the fiftieth day following the offering of the sheaf of firstfruits in the Feast of Unleavened Bread which was fulfilled in the resurrection of Christ as the firstfruits from among the dead, Lev. 23:15, 16, I Cor. 15:20), set a precedent for beginning to keep the first day in honor of the Lord. ... Love for God should motivate the Christian in his observance of the Christian Sabbath or the Lord's Day. We believe that a careful regard for the Lord's Day is still an appropriate mark of a pious people. It is still appropriate that Christians avoid unnecessary work and focus on their Creator on the Lord's Day. ... Personal recreation or social gatherings that detract from the sacred importance of the Lord's Day or hinder the attendance of church services should be avoided. Children should be taught early to carefully regard the Lord's Day by avoiding their usual loud and boisterous play. A sacred regard for the Sabbath is an integral part of holy living. We believe that such carefulness should mark every earnest child of God.

Similarly, the Book of Discipline of Ohio Yearly Meeting of the Religious Society of Friends (which aligned with the Wilburite branch of Quakerism) teaches "Remember the special opportunities for refreshment of spirit and for service which the first day of the week affords; use them faithfully, as befits the Friends of the Master."

=== Baptist churches ===
First-day Sabbatarian views are embodied in the confessions of faith held by both General Baptists and Reformed Baptists. With respect to General Baptists, the Treatise on the Faith and Practice of the Free Will Baptists states:

This is one day in seven, which from the creation of the world God has set apart for sacred rest and holy service. Under the former dispensation, the seventh day of the week, as commemorative of the work of creation, was set apart for the Lord's Day. Under the gospel, the first day of the week, in commemoration of the resurrection of Christ, and by authority of Christ and the apostles, is observed as the Christian Sabbath. On this day all men are required to refrain from secular labor and devote themselves to the worship and service of God.

Similarly, the Liberty Association Articles of Faith (1824), as well as the General Association Articles of Faith of both 1870 and 1949 all state:

We believe in the Sanctity of the Lords Day, the first day of the week, and that this day ought to be observed by worshipping God, witnessing for Christ, and ministering to the needs of humanity. We believe that secular work on Sunday should be limited to cases of necessity or mercy.

With regard to the Particular Baptists, the Second London Baptist Confession advances first-day Sabbatarian views identical to the Westminster Confession, held by Presbyterians, and the Savoy Declaration, held by Congregationalists.

Edward L. Smither explains that first-day Sabbatarianism is the normative view held by Baptists (both General and Reformed):

This Sunday sabbatarian view is also reflected in such key Baptist statements as Jessey's Catechism of 1652, Keach's Catechism of 1677, the Baptist Catechism for Girls and Boys of 1798, the Baptist Catechism of the Charleston Association of 1813, Spurgeon's Catechism of 1855, the Abstract of Principles of 1858, Everts' Catechism of 1866, Boyce's Catechism of 1867, and Broadus' Catechism of 1892. These documents (and the list is by no means exhaustive) exhort the faithful to abstain from all secular labor and amusements, and to reserve Sunday as a day of worship, spiritual endeavor, and rest.

Citing Hebrews 10:24–25, Nathan Rose, a clergyman in the Southern Baptist Church, states with regard to the Lord's Day that "for every Christian, attendance at church gatherings is not optional." Similarly the Baptist Faith and Message, Article VIII, states "[t]he first day of the week is the Lord's Day" and that "[i]t is a Christian institution for religious observance" (though nothing forbids a congregation from holding services on Saturday evenings).

=== Methodist churches ===
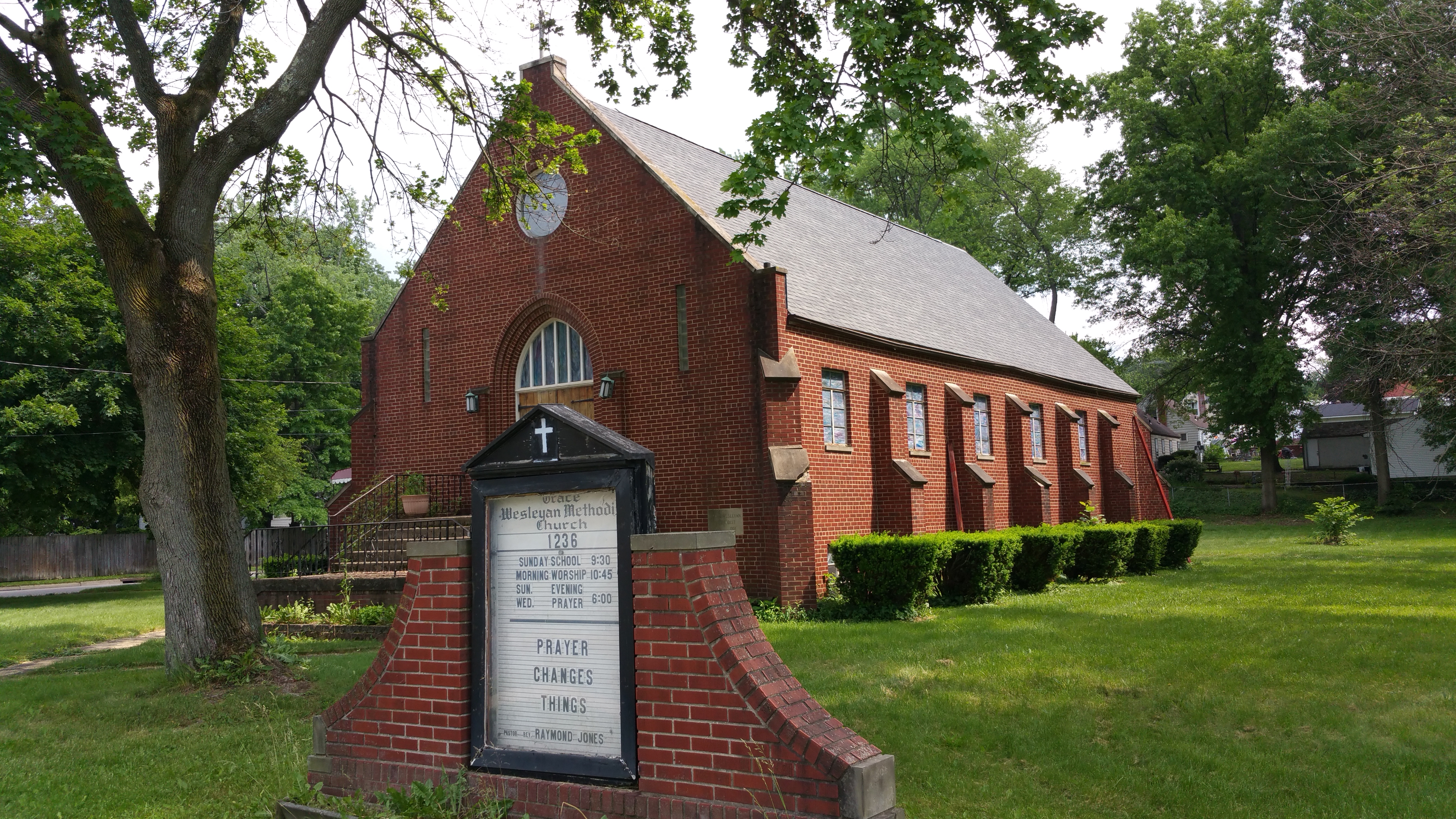
The sign of this Wesleyan Methodist church displays the times for the Sunday morning service of worship and Sunday evening service of worship, consistent with the historical First-day Sabbatarian doctrine of Methodism to keep holy the Lord's Day. The midweek Wednesday prayer service (a common Methodist observance) is indicated on the sign as well.

Like the aforementioned Calvinist groups, the early Methodists, who were Arminian in theology, were known for "religiously keeping the Sabbath day". They regarded "keeping the Lord's Day as a duty, a delight, and a means of grace". The General Rules of the Methodist Church require "attending upon all the ordinances of God" including "the public worship of God" and prohibit "profaning the day of the Lord, either by doing ordinary work therein or by buying or selling". Methodism, however, teaches that "Christ made allowances for acts of mercy on the Lord's Day such as; nurses, doctors, etc. [Matt. 12:11; John 5:15-16]". The Sunday Sabbatarian practices of the earlier Wesleyan Methodist Church in Great Britain are described by Jonathan Crowther in A Portraiture of Methodism:

They believe it to be their duty to keep the first day of the week as a sabbath. This, before Christ, was on the last day of the week; but from the time of his resurrection, was changed into the first day of the week, and is in scripture called, The Lord's Day, and is to be continued to the end of the world as the Christian sabbath. This they believe to be set apart by God, and for his worship by a positive, moral, and perpetual commandment. And they think it to be agreeable to the law of nature, as well as divine institution, that a due proportion of time should be set apart for the worship of God. ... This day ought to be kept holy unto the Lord, and men and women ought so to order their affairs, and prepare their hearts, that they may not only have a holy rest on that day, from worldly employments, words, and thoughts, but spend the day in the public and private duties of piety. No part of the day should be employed in any other way, except in works of mercy and necessity. On this day, they believe it to be their duty to worship God, and that not only in form, but at the same time in spirit and in truth. Therefore, they employ themselves in prayer and thanksgiving, in reading and meditating on the scriptures, in hearing the public preaching of God's word, in singing psalms, hymns, and spiritual songs, in Christian conversation, and in commemorating the dying love of the Lord Jesus Christ. ... And with them it is a prevailing idea, that God must be worshipped in spirit, daily, in private families, in the closet, and in the public assemblies.

In the past, individuals who engaged in buying and selling (with exception of medicine for the sick and necessaries for funerals) on the Christian Sabbath were to be excommunicated from the Wesleyan Methodist Church according to its Discipline. Wesleyan Methodists were also encouraged to neither to hire a barber on the Lord's Day, nor to employ one who conscientiously broke the Sabbath.

Karen B. Westerfield Tucker, a United Methodist elder and theologian, writes that the Sampson Circuit of the Methodist Episcopal Church made a Sabbatarian resolution that "resounded throughout all spheres of Methodism":

Whereas, we are positively commanded by Almighty God to remember the Sabbath Day to keep it Holy, Therefore Resolve that we, the members of this Quarterly Conference for the Sampson Circuit do most respectfully and earnestly invite the attention of our people to the absolute necessity of a more constant and prayerful observance of the Holy Sabbath.
Resolved that visiting on this day for the purpose of transacting temporal business is also a violation of the Holy Day.
Resolved that the running of Railroad Trains, Steamboats, Stages, and Etc., on the various lines of travel except in cases of absolute necessity, is a violation of the command of God, and tends to the demoralization of our people as much as it prevents tens of thousands from attendance upon divine worship and the proper influence of the Sabbath.
Resolved, that we call upon Christians and good citizens to speak out earnestly and constantly against all desecration of the day of the Lord and appeal to all who are guilty of this sin to cease this violation.

Similarly in 1921, the Methodist Episcopal Church, South heralded the Sunday Sabbath as a "day of worship, meditation and prayer". It proclaimed that the "tendency to commercialize the sabbath, making it a day of traffic, travel, business and pleasure is wrong and we want to sound a word of alarm and call our people to God's way of observance". As such, the Methodist Episcopal Church, South stated that it "oppose[s] the playing of baseball, golf, and like games on that day". The 2014 Discipline of the Bible Methodist Connection of Churches states, with regard to the Lord's Day:

We believe that the Lord’s Day, celebrated on Sunday, the first day of the week, throughout the Christian church, is the Christian sabbath, which we reverently observe as a day of rest and worship and as the continuing memorial of our Savior’s resurrection. For this reason, we abstain from secular work and from all merchandising on this holy day, except that required by mercy or necessity.

Reflecting the traditional Methodist standards regarding first-day Sabbabbatarianism, the 2018 Handbook for the Evangelical Wesleyan Bible Institute (EWBI), a seminary of the Evangelical Wesleyan Church, states:

The Scripture commands, "Remember the Sabbath Day to keep it holy." The spirit of Sunday observance prompts worship toward God and rest from the weekly work routine. We encourage those activities which honor the Lord and contribute to the furtherance of the Gospel. Students are not to desecrate the Lord's Day by unnecessary labor, business transactions, holiday diversions, secular pleasure seeking, or patronizing secular papers. (Part 57 paragraph 6, Discipline of the Evangelical Wesleyan Church.)

The Statement of Faith of the Fellowship of Independent Methodist Churches teaches:

God has, in His Word, by a positive, moral and perpetual commandment, binding all men in all ages, appointed one day in seven, for a Sabbath, to be kept holy unto Him. In this present dispensation the first day of the week is the Lord's Day or Christian Sabbath. It is commemorative of our Lord's resurrection and is an emblem of that rest which remaineth for the people of God. It is to be kept holy unto God by abstaining from all secular labour and recreation and by the proper observance of all the means of grace, both private and public. Only works of necessity, mercy or religion are permitted on the Lord's Day.

Methodist churches have historically observed the Lord's Day devoutly with a morning service of worship, along with an evening service of worship.

=== Holiness Pentecostalism ===
Churches in the Holiness Pentecostal tradition hold to the historic Methodist views on the Lord's Day; Holiness Pentecostal churches have a morning service of worship and an evening service of worship on the Lord's Day. To this end, Holiness Pentecostal churches "oppose the increasing commercialization and secularization of Sunday." The 1900 Book of Discipline of the Fire-Baptized Holiness Church, a Holiness Pentecostal denomination, states:

Every member of the Fire-Baptized Holiness Association of America shall be required to observe the Lord's Day according to the teachings of Jesus Christ and the holy apostles, and to abstain from doing their own pleasure thereon.

The "Conditions for Membership" of the Calvary Holiness Association state:

We recognize Sunday as the Sabbath. Ordinary labor and business should be strictly avoided by our members (Ex. 20:8-9).

== Saturday and Sunday Sabbatarians ==
Keith A. Burton stated that "The church in Africa [recognized] that the resurrection of Christ in no way nullified the fact that 'in six days the Lord made heaven and earth.' ...Even though the power of the Western papal legacy has made some indelible indentations on the churches of Africa, to this day they have refused to fully succumb."

Deriving from the precepts of the Apostolic Constitutions, the Oriental Orthodox Tewahedo church most famously in Eritrea and Ethiopia practice two-day sabbatarianism, observing both Saturday and Sunday as the Sabbath. Likewise, the Coptic Church alongside other Oriental Orthodox bodies, "stipulates that the seventh-day Sabbath, along with Sunday, be continuously regarded as a festal day for religious celebration."

== Saturday Sabbatarianism ==
=== Seventh Day Baptists ===
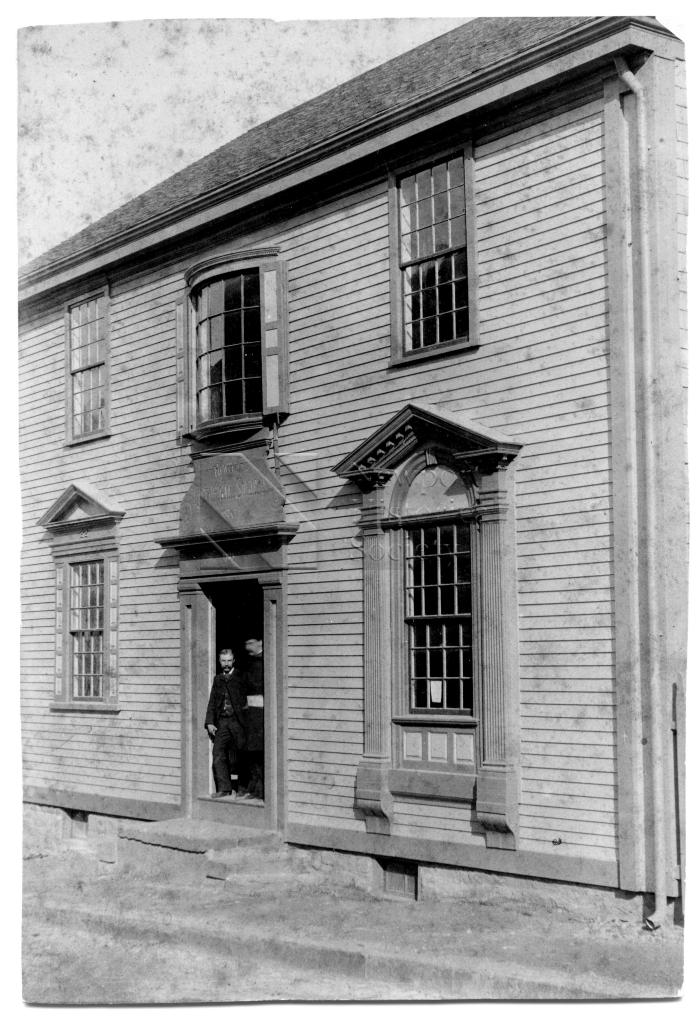
The oldest Sabbatarian church in the Americas (Seventh Day Baptist), built in 1730, Newport, Rhode Island

Seventh Day Baptists are Christian Baptists who observe seventh-day Sabbath, as a holy day to God. They understand that observance is as a sign of obedience in a covenant relationship with God and not as a condition of salvation. They adopt a covenant Baptist theology, based on the concept of regenerated society, conscious baptism of believers by immersion, congregational government and the scriptural basis of opinion and practice.

The first known Seventh Day Baptist Church was the Mill Yard Church established in London, where the first service took place in 1651, led by Peter Chamberlen. M.D. "the Third". The first records of church activities were destroyed in a fire; the second record book is in possession of the Seventh Day Baptist Historical Library and Archives, the local church continues its activities to this day. Immigration to the British colonies in North America also included Seventh Day Baptists, the couple Stephen and Anne Mumford were the first Seventh Day Baptists in the Americas and with five other Baptists who kept the Sabbath, establishing in 1672 the first Seventh Day Baptist Church in the Americas. A similar occurrence in Piscataway, New Jersey in 1705 led to the formation of a sister conference among the Germans in Ephrata, Pennsylvania in about 1728. The Seventh Day Baptist General Conference united them in 1802. The Ephrata community formed the German Religious Society of Seventh Day Baptists in 1814 and its site came to be known as the Ephrata Cloister. Its last surviving resident, Marie Kachel Bucher, died on July 27, 2008, at the age of 98, but its grounds are now owned by the Commonwealth of Pennsylvania and are open to public viewing.

Embracing education where it had not yet become available to the public, the churches established schools, including three that became colleges in Alfred, New York, Milton, Wisconsin, and Salem, West Virginia. A seminary was added at Alfred University in 1871. Missionary activity in the 19th century led to expansion both in the U.S. and overseas into China, India, the Philippines, Oceania, and Africa. Today, its General Conference offices are located in Janesville, Wisconsin.

United in a literal interpretation of the Sabbath commandment to keep the seventh day holy (in worship) and to rest, Seventh Day Baptists leave other observances largely to its individual members to interpret and follow for themselves. In this way it represents the least uniform and least rigorous type of Sabbatarianism.

=== Seventh-day Adventism ===
The Seventh-day Adventist Church is the largest modern seventh-day Sabbatarian denomination, with 20,008,779 members as of June 2018, and holds the sabbath as one of the Pillars of Adventism. Seventh-day Adventism grew out of the Millerite movement in the 1840s, and a few of its founders (Cyrus Farnsworth, Frederick Wheeler, a Methodist minister and Joseph Bates, a sea captain) were convinced in 1844–1845 of the importance of Sabbatarianism under the influence of Rachel Oakes Preston, a young Seventh Day Baptist laywoman living in Washington, New Hampshire, and a published article in early 1845 on the topic by Thomas M. Preble, pastor of the Free Will Baptist congregation in Nashua, New Hampshire.

Preble was the first Millerite to promote the sabbath in print form, through the February 28, 1845, issue of the Adventist Hope of Israel in Portland, Maine. In March he published his sabbath views in tract form as A Tract, Showing that the Seventh Day Should be Observed as the Sabbath, Instead of the First Day; "According to the Commandment". This tract led to the conversion of John Nevins Andrews and other Adventist families in Paris, Maine, as well as the 1845 conversion of Joseph Bates, who became the foremost proponent of the sabbath among this group. These men in turn convinced James Springer White, Ellen Harmon (later White), and Hiram Edson of New Hampshire. Preble is known to have kept seventh-day sabbath until mid-1847. He later repudiated the sabbath and opposed the Seventh-day Adventists, authoring The First-Day Sabbath.

Bates proposed an 1846 meeting among the believers in New Hampshire and Port Gibson, New York, which took place at Edson's farm, where Edson and other Port Gibson believers readily accepted the sabbath message and forged an alliance with Bates, White, and Harmon. Between April 1848 and December 1850, 22 sabbath conferences in New York and New England allowed White, Bates, Edson, and Stephen Pierce to reach conclusions about doctrinal issues.

Also in 1846, a pamphlet written by Bates created widespread interest in the sabbath. Bates, White, Harmon, Edson, Wheeler, and S. W. Rhodes led the promotion of the sabbath, partly through regular publications. Present Truth magazine was largely devoted to the sabbath at first. J. N. Andrews was the first Adventist to write a book-length defense of the sabbath, first published in 1861. Two of Andrews' books include Testimony of the Fathers of the First Three Centuries Concerning the Sabbath and the First Day and History of the Sabbath.

Traditionally, Seventh-day Adventists teach that the Ten Commandments (including the fourth commandment concerning the sabbath) are part of the moral law of God, not abrogated by the teachings of Jesus, which apply equally to Christians. Seventh-day Adventists believe it is possible to maintain an antinomian position while at the same time faithfully observing the Ten Commandments. Adventists make a keen distinction between the "law of Moses" and the "law of God", with the former being the traditional levitical requirements intended to maintain the integrity of the ancient nation of Israel and their special role in sharing God with the rest of the world, and the latter being the universal moral code by which the universe is governed. In other words, Adventists have traditionally distinguished between "moral law" and "ceremonial law", arguing that the moral law (the Ten Commandments) continues to bind Christians, while events symbolized by the ceremonial law (the law of Moses) were fulfilled by Christ's death on the cross.

Seventh-day Adventists observe the sabbath from Friday sunset to Saturday sunset. In places where the sun does not appear or does not set for several months, such as northern Scandinavia, the tendency is to regard an arbitrary time such as 6 p.m. as "sunset". During the sabbath, Adventists avoid secular work and business, although medical relief and humanitarian work is accepted. Though there are cultural variations, most Adventists also avoid activities such as shopping, sport, and certain forms of entertainment. Adventists typically gather for church services on Saturday morning. Some also gather on Friday evening to welcome in the sabbath hours (sometimes called "vespers" or "opening Sabbath"), and some similarly gather at "closing Sabbath".

==== Eschatology ====
The pioneers of the church have traditionally taught that the seventh-day Sabbath could be a test, leading to the sealing of God's people during the end times, though there is little consensus about how this will play out. The church has traditionally taught that there could be an international Sunday law enforced by a coalition of religious and secular authorities, and that all who do not observe it will be persecuted, imprisoned or martyred. This is taken from the church's interpretation, following Ellen G. White, of Daniel 7:25, Revelation 13:15, Revelation 7, Ezekiel 20:12–20, and Exodus 31:13. Some early Adventists were indeed jailed for working on Sunday, in violation of various local blue laws that legislated Sunday as a day of rest. It was speculated by Ellen G. White that a universal Sunday law would soon be enforced and would serve as a sign of the end times.

=== Eastern Orthodoxy ===
In Eastern Orthodoxy, the Sabbath is still considered to be on Saturday however, the day of worship is on Sunday (the Lord’s Day) which is considered to be a mini-Pascha celebration. Saturday is also considered to be a day of preparation for the Lord’s Day. Sunday worship is not considered to be a direct observance of the Sabbath. Despite that, more emphasis is put on the Lord’s Day.

=== Modern Seventh-day Sabbatarian groups ===
Seventh-day Sabbatarian Baptists

- Seventh Day Baptists

Sabbatarian Adventists

- Adventist Church of Promise
- Church of God (Seventh Day)
- Creation Seventh Day Adventist Church
- Sabbath Rest Advent Church
- Seventh-day Adventist Church
- Seventh Day Adventist Reform Movement
  - True and Free Seventh-day Adventists
- Shepherd's Rod (Davidian Seventh-day Adventists)
- United Sabbath-Day Adventist Church
- United Seventh-Day Brethren

Seventh-day Sabbatarian Pentecostals

- Nazareth Baptist Church
- Soldiers of the Cross Church
- True Jesus Church

Seventh-day Sabbatarian British Israelites (Armstrongism)

- Church of God International (United States)
- Church of the Great God
- Church of God Preparing for the Kingdom of God
- Global Church of God
- House of Yahweh
- Intercontinental Church of God
- Living Church of God
- Philadelphia Church of God
- Restored Church of God
- United Church of God

Others

- Assemblies of Yahweh
- Black Hebrew Israelites
  - African Hebrew Israelites of Jerusalem
  - Church of God and Saints of Christ
    - Church of God and Saints of Christ (Orthodox Christianity)
  - Commandment Keepers
- Hebrew Roots Movement
- Makuya
- Messianic Judaism, some Messianic Jews observe Shabbat on Saturdays
- Sacred Name Movement
  - Yahweh's Assembly in Yahshua
- Subbotniks, the majority belonged to Rabbinic and Karaite Judaism, the minority to Christianity
- Yehowists, a Russian Spiritual Christian millenarian movement founded in the 1840s
- The Christ's Assembly
- Church of Jesus Christ of Latter Day Saints (Strangite)
- Jemaat Allah Global Indonesia (JAGI), internationally known as Unitarian Christian Church of Indonesia, headquartered in Semarang, Central Java, Indonesia
- Logos Apostolic Church of God, in the UK, Kenya, Uganda, Tanzania, and Sudan
- Remnant Fellowship, headquartered in Brentwood, Tennessee and founded in 1999 by Gwen Shamblin Lara
- The Seventh-day Remnant Church
- World Mission Society Church of God

== See also ==
- High Sabbaths
- Subbotniks
- Szekler Sabbatarians
