= Remember the sabbath day, to keep it holy =

One of the Ten Commandments

"Remember the Sabbath day, to keep it holy" (Hebrew: זָכוֹר אֶת יוֹם הַשַׁבָּת לְקַדְּשׁוֹ, romanized: Zāḵōr ’eṯ-yōm haš-šabbāṯ lə-qaddəšō) is one of the Ten Commandments found in the Torah.

The full text of the commandment reads:

Remember the Sabbath day, to keep it holy. Six days you shall labor, and do all your work, but the seventh day is the Sabbath of the LORD your God. In it you shall not do any work, you, or your son, or your daughter, your male servant, or your female servant, or your livestock, or the sojourner who is within your gates. For in six days the LORD made heaven and earth, the sea, and all that is in them, and rested on the seventh day. Therefore the LORD blessed the Sabbath day and made it holy.

— Exodus, 20:8-11

== Background ==
According to the biblical narrative when God revealed the Ten Commandments to the Israelites at Mount Sinai, they were commanded to remember the Sabbath and keep it holy by not doing any work and allowing the whole household to cease from work. This was in recognition of God's act of creation and the special status that God had conferred on the seventh day during the creation week.

== Ancient understanding ==
The Torah portrays the Sabbath concept both in terms of resting on the seventh day and allowing land to lie fallow during each seventh year. The motivation is described as going beyond a sign and remembrance of Yahweh's original rest during the creation week and extends to a concern that one's servants, family, and livestock be able to rest and be refreshed from their work. In addition to the instruction to rest on each seventh day and seventh year, periods of seven days are often relevant aspects of Biblical instructions. For example, the quarantine period for suspected skin diseases after initial examination by a priest was seven days, after which the priest would re-examine the skin and pronounce the person clean or unclean. Other special days included the day after the seventh Sabbath, the first day of the seventh month, the day of ritual cleansing after being healed from an unclean disease or other event bringing uncleanness. In addition, in the battle of Jericho, Joshua commanded the army to march around Jericho each day for seven consecutive days and to march around Jericho seven times on the seventh day.

The Torah describes disobedience to the command to keep the Sabbath day holy as punishable by death and failing to observe Sabbath years would be compensated for during the captivity that would result from breaking covenant. The Torah also describes how special bread was to be set out before Yahweh Sabbath by Sabbath and describes Sabbath day offerings.

The Day of Atonement was regarded as a "Sabbath of Sabbaths" It was on this day alone that the High Priest of Israel entered the Holy of Holies inside the Tabernacle where the Ark of the Covenant contained the stone tablets on which the Ten Commandments were engraved. The presence of YHWH in the Holy of Holies on that yearly day, upon the mercy seat, required that the Kohen Gadol be first purified by the sacrifice of a bull in a prescribed manner. Entering the Most Holy Place on other days or without fulfilling the ritual requirements would subject the priest to death.

In the same way that observing the Sabbath did not prevent Joshua from marching around Jericho for seven consecutive days, Sabbath observance did not prevent the chief priest Jehoiada from organizing a palace coup on the Sabbath in order to remove queen Athaliah from the throne and replace her with Jehoash of Judah, a rightful heir to the throne. Athaliah had murdered all the other heirs to the throne upon the death of Ahaziah of Judah and usurped the throne of Judah for herself. Jehoiada's wife had rescued young Joash, and Jehoiada had kept him hidden for six years while Ataliah reigned as queen over Judah. The priest Jehoiada used the occasion of the transfer of the guard on the Sabbath to proclaim Joash as king because at that time, he could arrange twice the normal guard on duty at the temple of Yahweh. On that day, a covenant was made, Joash was proclaimed king, Athaliah was put to death, the temple of Baal was torn down, idols were smashed, and Mattan, the priest of Baal, was killed.

A number of the prophets condemn desecration of the Sabbath with various forms of work, including Isaiah, Jeremiah, Ezekiel, and Amos. According to Nehemiah, after the captives return to Jerusalem from Exile, they make a covenant which includes a promise to refrain from desecrating the Sabbath, yet some give in to the ongoing temptation to buy and sell on the Sabbath. As a result, Nehemiah has to rebuke them and station guards to prevent commerce in Jerusalem on the Sabbath.

== Jewish view ==
Ibn Ezra taught that the Exodus account of the Ten Commandments contains the text exactly as written on the stone tablets and that the different version in Deuteronomy contains Moses' words which remind Israel to obey the commandments, "as the LORD your God has commanded you." Ibn Ezra explains that Moses did not need to re-iterate the reference to six days of creation at the beginning of the commandment in Deuteronomy, because the command in Deuteronomy itself refers back to the command from Exodus with the words "as YHWH your Elohim has commanded you." Instead, Moses revealed in Deuteronomy the motive for the command that slaves rest on the Sabbath day in order that Israel remember that they were slaves in Egypt and that God redeemed them.

Rabbi Moshe ben Nachman (the Ramban) also views the Exodus version of the Sabbath day commandment as a direct recitation by God, and the version in Deuteronomy as Moses' personal reconstruction and exposition. The Ramban explains that Moses wishes to emphasize that the prohibition of work extends even to agricultural work aimed at food production. He further explains the difference in the stated rationals (creation in Exodus, exodus in Deuteronomy). The exodus from Egypt serves as further evidence of Yahweh's creation of the world. God's awesome display of power during the exodus annuls any doubts regarding YHWH as Creator, because only the Creator can possess such total control over the elements.

Thus the Sabbath is a remembrance of the exodus from Egypt, and the exodus is a remembrance of the Sabbath, for on it [the Sabbath] they remember and say that it is Elohim who ... created everything at the beginning of creation ... Now he did not explain here [in Deuteronomy] that the reason for the rest [on the Sabbath] is that in six days the Eternal made heaven since this has already been mentioned many times in the Torah. Instead...he explained to them that from the Exodus from Egypt they will know that it was He who spoke and the world came into existence, and He ceased from work thereon.'

Maimonides (the Rambam) gives equal footing to both rationales for the Sabbath command:

YHWH commanded us to abstain from work on the Sabbath, and to rest, for two purposes; namely, (1) That we might confirm the true theory, that of the Creation, which at once and clearly leads to the theory of the existence of God. (2) That we might remember how kind God had been in freeing us from the burden of the Egyptians - The Sabbath is therefore a double blessing: it gives us correct notions, and also promotes the well-being of our bodies.

== Christian view ==
=== New Testament ===
Moral imperatives mirroring nine of the Ten Commandments are repeated in the New Testament, but the commandment regarding the Sabbath is notably absent. However, the background and Jewish understanding of the Sabbath commandment underscore much of the New Testament narratives and discussion. For example, Jesus is described as pointing out to the Jews their misunderstanding of the Mosaic Law by making observance of the Sabbath more rigorous than God had commanded. It was not unlawful to eat on the Sabbath, even if food must be obtained by plucking grain from the ears. It was not unlawful to do good on the Sabbath day. Healing was a work of mercy, and Jesus, portrayed as Lord of the Sabbath, was merciful. Consequently, criticisms of healing on the Sabbath were unjustified.

At that time Jesus went through the grainfields on the Sabbath. His disciples were hungry and began to pick some heads of grain and eat them. When the Pharisees saw this, they said to him, "Look! Your disciples are doing what is unlawful on the Sabbath."

He answered, "Haven't you read what David did when he and his companions were hungry? He entered the house of God, and he and his companions ate the consecrated bread—which was not lawful for them to do, but only for the priests. Or haven't you read in the Law that on the Sabbath the priests in the temple desecrate the day and yet are innocent? I tell you that one greater than the temple is here. If you had known what these words mean, 'I desire mercy, not sacrifice,' you would not have condemned the innocent. For the Son of Man is Lord of the Sabbath."

Going on from that place, he went into their synagogue, and a man with a shriveled hand was there. Looking for a reason to accuse Jesus, they asked him, "Is it lawful to heal on the Sabbath?" He said to them, "If any of you has a sheep and it falls into a pit on the Sabbath, will you not take hold of it and lift it out? How much more valuable is a man than a sheep! Therefore it is lawful to do good on the Sabbath."

Then he said to the man, "Stretch out your hand." So he stretched it out and it was completely restored, just as sound as the other. But the Pharisees went out and plotted how they might kill Jesus.

— Matthew 12:1-14 NIV

=== Catholic views ===
The Catholic Church views the commandment to "remember the Sabbath day and keep it holy" (Exodus 20:8–10) as an essential part of observing the command to "love the Lord your God with all your heart, and with all your soul and with all your mind." (Mark 2:27–28) Catholic teaching emphasizes the holiness of the Sabbath day (Exodus 31:15), connects the Sabbath with God's rest after the six days of creation (Exodus 20:11), views the Sabbath as a reminder of Israel's liberation from bondage (Deuteronomy 5:15), and views God's example of resting on the seventh day as an example for human resting and protesting the servitude of work and the worship of money. (Exodus 31:17, 23:12) The Catechism of the Catholic Church discusses many incidents when Jesus was accused of violating the Sabbath law, and points out that Jesus never fails to respect the holiness of this day. (Mark 1:21, John 9:16) Jesus is described as giving the Sabbath law its authentic and authoritative interpretation: "The sabbath was made for man, not man for the sabbath." (Mark 2:27) With compassion, Christ declares the Sabbath for doing good rather than harm, for saving life rather than killing. (Mark 3:4)

Sunday is distinguished from the Sabbath, which it follows. According to Catholic teaching, ceremonial observance of Christ's resurrection on the first day of the week replaces that of the Sabbath.

Sunday is described as a fulfillment of the spiritual truth of the Jewish Sabbath and an announcement of man's eternal rest in God. The Catholic Catechism describes Sunday celebration as observing the "moral commandment inscribed by nature in the human heart to render to God an outward, visible, public, and regular worship." Thus, Sunday worship fulfills the "moral command of the Old Covenant, taking up its rhythm and spirit in the weekly celebration of the Creator and Redeemer of his people." The Catholic Church teaches that the Lord's day should be "a day of grace and rest from work" to cultivate their "familial, cultural, social, and religious lives." On Sundays and other holy days, faithful Christians are to refrain from work and activities that have no relation to religion, the joy proper to the Lord's Day, works of mercy, and the "appropriate relaxation of mind and body." Christians also sanctify Sunday by giving time and care to their families and relatives, often difficult to do on other days of the week. "Sunday is a time for reflection, silence, cultivation of the mind, and meditation which furthers the growth of the Christian interior life." In addition to one's own rest, Christians should avoid making unnecessary demands on others that would hinder them from observing the Lord's Day.

=== Lutheran views ===
Martin Luther taught that with regard to external observance, the Sabbath commandment was given to Jews alone and not strictly applicable to Christians. Luther did see wisdom in voluntary observance of a day to rest from labor and pay particular attention to Christian duties of reading the Scriptures, worshiping God, and prayer. He thought that this need not occur on any particular day, but should continue on Sunday (the Lord's day), since this was the long established practice, and there was no reason to create disorder by unnecessary innovation. Luther emphasized that no day is made holy by rest alone, but rather by the individual seeking to be holy through washing himself in God's word.

For the Word of God is the sanctuary above all sanctuaries, yea, the only one which we Christians know and have…God's Word is the treasure which sanctifies everything, and by which even all the saints themselves were sanctified. At whatever hour then, God's Word is taught, preached, heard, read or meditated upon, there the person, day, and work are sanctified thereby, not because of the external work, but because of the Word which makes saints of us all. Therefore I constantly say that all our life and work must be ordered according to God's Word, if it is to be God-pleasing or holy. Where this is done, this commandment is in force and being fulfilled.

— Martin Luther, The Large Catechism

From Martin Luther there is also the following comments on the reason for, importance of, and continuing need for the seventh-day Sabbath, specifically, found in Luther on the Creation: A Critical and Devotional Commentary on Genesis 1-3:

God did not sanctify to himself the heaven nor the earth nor any other creature. But God did sanctify to himself the seventh day. This was especially designed of God, to cause us to understand the seventh day is to be especially devoted to divine worship. For that which is appropriated to God and exclusively separated from all profane uses is sanctified or holy...

It follows therefore from this passage, that if Adam had stood in his innocence and had not fallen he would yet have observed the "seventh day" as sanctified, holy and sacred; that is, he would have taught his children and posterity on that day concerning the will and worship of God.

Further by this sanctification of the Sabbath it is also plainly shown that man was especially created for the knowledge and worship of God. For the Sabbath was not instituted on account of sheep or oxen, but for the sake of men, that the knowledge of God might be exercised and increased by them on that sacred day. Although therefore man lost the knowledge of God by sin, yet God willed that his command concerning the sanctifying of the Sabbath should remain. He willed that on the seventh day both the Word should be preached, and also those other parts of his worship performed, which he himself instituted; so the end that by those appointed means we should first of all think solemnly on our condition in the world as men; that this nature of ours was created ...for the knowledge and the glorifying of God; and also that by these same sacred means we might hold fast in our minds the same hope of a future and eternal life.

Here one does not find Luther saying the Sabbath command of Genesis 1 is something that could be dispensed with. It was the command of the Creator of the universe and had a specific purpose.

=== Reformed views ===
John Calvin taught that since Jesus Christ fulfilled the Sabbath, binding observance to the Sabbath was abrogated for Christians. However, he emphasized that because Christians are buried with Christ in baptism and raised from the dead to the glory of God the Father (Romans 6:4), that what Christ fulfilled in the Sabbath requires not one day each week, but rather "requires the whole course of our lives, until being completely dead to ourselves, we are filled with the life of God." Calvin taught that spiritual wisdom deserves to have some part of every day devoted to it, but owing to the weakness of many daily meetings cannot be held. Consequently, the pattern of weekly observance established by God is useful for the church to emulate. This church practice is not to be in the manner of Jewish observance of minute formalities, but rather one of ordering church life in a useful and predictable manner to serve the body with opportunity to hear the word, receive the sacraments, and participate in public prayer.

Andreas Karlstadt University of Wittenberg chancellor, a contemporary of Martin Luther and a reformer of the early Reformation, defended the observance of the Sabbath, the seventh day of the week, as a holy day to the Lord. His defense of the Sabbath, and others among the Anabaptists, caused him to be censured as a Jew and a heretic.

The Westminster Confession of Faith describes the Sabbath day as being the seventh day of the week from the creation until the resurrection of Christ, and as being changed to the first day of the week with Christ's resurrection.

VI. Neither prayer, nor any other part of religious worship, is now, under the Gospel, either tied unto, or made more acceptable by any place in which it is performed, or towards which it is directed: [John 4:21] but God is to be worshipped everywhere,[Malachi 1:11, 1 Timothy 2:8] in spirit and truth;[John 4:23] as, in private families[Jeremiah 10:25, Deuteronomy 6:6-7, 1 Peter 3:7, Acts 10:2] daily,[Matthew 6:11] and in secret, each one by himself;[Matthew 6:6, Ephesians 6:18] so, more solemnly in the public assemblies, which are not carelessly or wilfully to be neglected, or forsaken, when God, by His Word or providence, calls thereunto.[Isaiah 56:6-7, Hebrews 10:25, Acts 13:42, Luke 4:16, Acts 2:42]

VII. As it is the law of nature, that, in general, a due proportion of time be set apart for the worship of God; so, in His Word, by a positive, moral, and perpetual commandment binding all men in all ages, He has particularly appointed one day in seven, for a Sabbath, to be kept holy unto him:[Exodus 20:8-11, Isaiah 56:2-11] which, from the beginning of the world to the resurrection of Christ, was the last day of the week: and, from the resurrection of Christ, was changed into the first day of the week,[Genesis 2:2, 1 Corinthians 16:1-2, Acts 20:7] which, in Scripture, is called the Lord's Day,[Revelation 1:10] and is to be continued to the end of the world, as the Christian Sabbath.[Exodus 20:8,10, Matthew 5:17-18]

VIII. This Sabbath is to be kept holy unto the Lord when men, after a due preparing of their hearts, and ordering of their common affairs beforehand, do not only observe an holy rest all the day from their own works, words, and thoughts about their worldly employments and recreations,[Exodus 20:8, Exodus 16:23-30, Exodus 31:15-17, Isaiah 58:13, Nehemiah 13:15-22] but also are taken up the whole time in the public and private exercises of His worship, and in the duties of necessity and mercy.[Isaiah 58:13]

=== Methodist views ===
In Methodism, an "important aspect of the pursuit of sanctification is the careful following" of the Ten Commandments. The General Rules of the Methodist Church required "attending upon all the ordinances of God" including "the public worship of God" and prohibited "profaning the day of the Lord, either by doing ordinary work therein or by buying or selling". As such, "Methodist observance of the Lord's Day was grounded in their sense that the observance of Sunday as a day of rest fulfilled the Commandement to sanctify the Sabbath." The 2014 Discipline of the Bible Methodist Connection of Churches states, with regard to the Lord's Day:

We believe that the Lord's Day, celebrated on Sunday, the first day of the week, throughout the Christian church, is the Christian sabbath, which we reverently observe as a day of rest and worship and as the continuing memorial of our Savior's resurrection. For this reason, we abstain from secular work and from all merchandising on this holy day, except that required by mercy or necessity.

Theologically speaking, for Methodists, Sunday is "the special but not the only day for worship, it is hallowed by God, recalls creation and the resurrection, requires release from earthly toil and responsibilities, and anticipates the eschatological day of the Lord that is the hope and desire of all believers."

=== Latter-day Saints views ===
Members of the Church of Jesus Christ of Latter-day Saints believe the Lord has commanded them to continue to observe the Sabbath. He has promised them that if they obey this commandment, they will receive "the fullness of the earth." Members are taught that they should keep it a holy day and it should be reserved for holy activities. Latter-day Saints attend sacrament meeting each week, which includes the ordinance of partaking of bread and water in remembrance of Jesus Christ as he instructed his apostles to do at the Last Supper. Other Sabbath-day activities may include: praying, meditating, studying the scriptures and the teachings of latter-day prophets, reading wholesome material, spending time with family, visiting the sick and distressed, and attending other Church meetings.

=== Seventh-day Adventists ===
Seventh-day Adventists observe the sabbath from Friday sunset to Saturday sunset. In places where the sun does not appear or does not set for several months, such as northern Scandinavia, the tendency is to regard an arbitrary time such as 6 p.m. as "sunset". During the sabbath, Adventists avoid secular work and business, although medical relief and humanitarian work is excepted. Though there are cultural variations, most Adventists also avoid activities such as shopping, sport, and certain forms of entertainment. Adventists typically gather for church services on Saturday morning. Some also gather on Friday evening to welcome in the sabbath hours (sometimes called "vespers" or "opening Sabbath"), and some similarly gather at "closing Sabbath".

Traditionally, Seventh-day Adventists hold that the Ten Commandments (including the fourth commandment concerning the sabbath) are part of the moral law of God, not abrogated by the teachings of Jesus Christ, which apply equally to Christians. Adventists have traditionally distinguished between "moral law" (the Ten Commandments) and "ceremonial law" (Korban system of sacrifices), arguing that moral law continues to bind Christians, while events predicted by the ceremonial law were fulfilled by Christ's death on the cross.

== See also ==
- Sunday shopping
