= Lord of the Sabbath =

Expression describing Jesus which appears in all three Synoptic Gospels

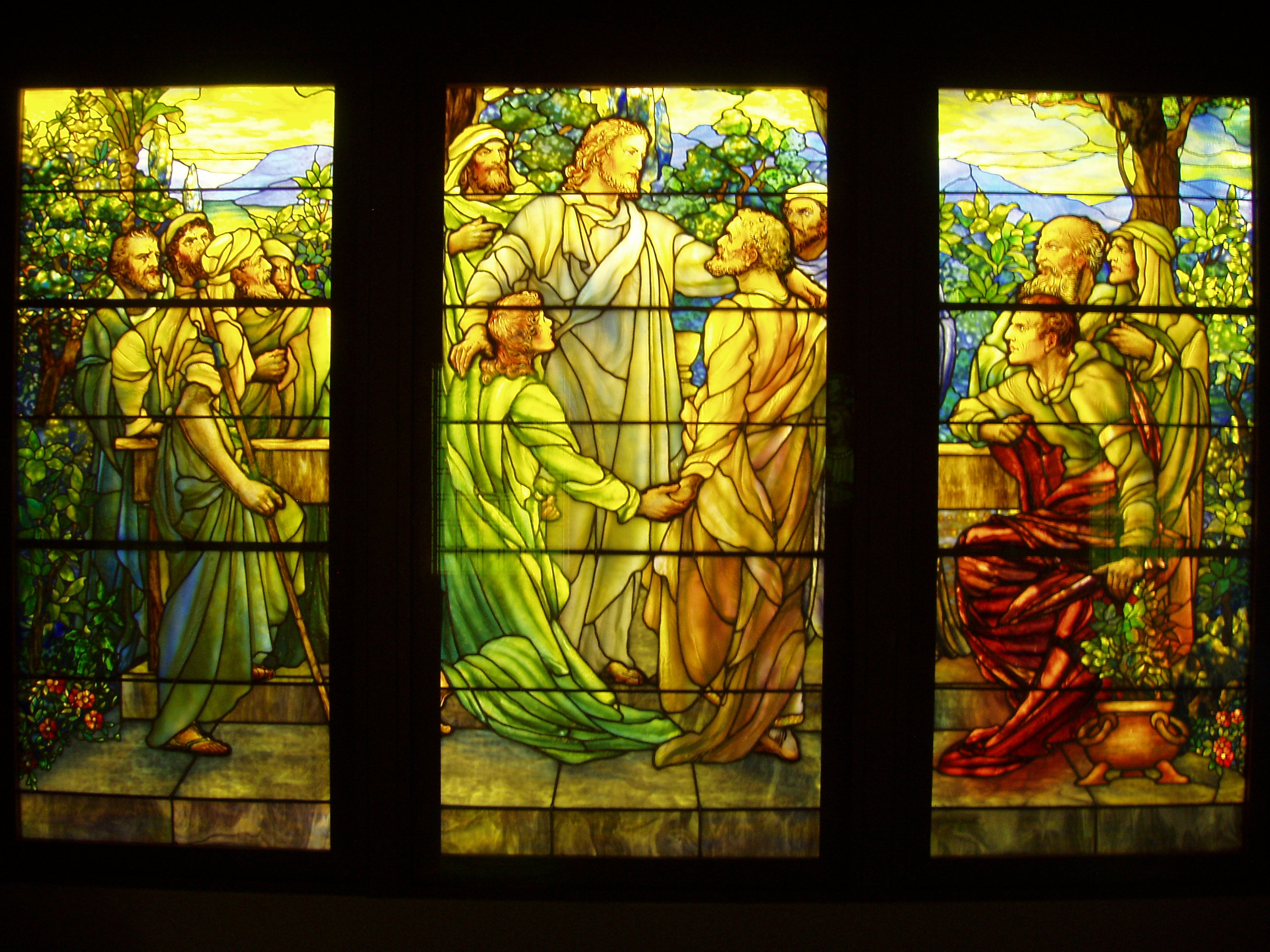
Christ and his Apostles, Tiffany stained glass, 1890.

The Lord of the Sabbath is an expression describing Jesus which appears in all three Synoptic Gospels: Matthew 12:1–8, Mark 2:23–28 and Luke 6:1–5. These sections each relate an encounter between Jesus, his Apostles and the Pharisees, the first of the four "Sabbath controversies".

According to the Gospel of Mark:

²³One Sabbath Jesus was going through the grainfields, and as his disciples walked along, they began to pick some heads of grain. ²⁴The Pharisees said to him, "Look, why are they doing what is unlawful on the Sabbath?"

²⁵He answered, "Have you never read what David did when he and his companions were hungry and in need? ²⁶In the days of Abiathar the high priest, he entered the house of God and ate the consecrated bread, which is lawful only for priests to eat. And he also gave some to his companions."

²⁸Then he said to them, "The Sabbath was made for man, not man for the Sabbath. ²⁸So the Son of Man is Lord even of the Sabbath."

—

Mark 2:23–28, NIV

Some versionsof the Gospel of Luke provide a specific date for the incident – the second Sabbath after the first (likely to mean the Sabbaths counted from the Feast of First Fruits in accordance with Leviticus 23).

The Gospel of Matthew only provides an additional example to justify working on the Sabbath as "a second example, if the first does not convince you": "Or haven't you read in the Law that the priests on Sabbath duty in the temple desecrate the Sabbath and yet are innocent?".

Lutheran theologian Johann Albrecht Bengel suggested that this dialogue could have taken place at the time of year when the regulations on temple sacrifices in the Book of Leviticus were being read during Sabbath services; however, the Pulpit Commentary questions this by reference to a "double uncertainty: first, what time of year it really was; and secondly, what is the antiquity of the present custom of reading the whole Law every year?"

Matthew makes two statements regarding Jesus' view of his role: he is Lord [even] of the Sabbath and also he is "one greater than the Temple". There are different interpretations of the reference to the Son of man statement in Matthew 12:1–8 that "the Son of man is Lord of the Sabbath". It may mean that Jesus is claiming to be the Lord or that his Apostles are entitled to do as they wish on the Sabbath.

1 Samuel 21:1–6 says the incident referenced by Jesus occurred when Ahimelech was the high priest, not Abiathar, as written in Mark. Different Bible verses label one or another of these priests as the father of the other (see Abiathar § Confusion of the name).

== See also ==
- Mark 2
- Gospel harmony
- Son of man (Christianity)
- Calling of Matthew
- Biblical Sabbath
- Biblical law in Christianity
