= High Sabbaths =

Seven annual biblical festivals and rest days

High Sabbaths, in most Christian and Messianic Jewish usage, are seven annual biblical festivals and rest days, recorded in the books of Leviticus and Deuteronomy. This is an extension of the term "high day" found in the King James Version at John 19:31.

== Biblical rest days ==
The seven festivals do not necessarily occur on weekly Shabbat (seventh-day Sabbath) and are called by the name miqra ("called assembly") in Hebrew (Lev. 23). They are observed by Jews and a minority of Christians. Two of the shabbath (holy assemblies) occur in spring on the first and last day of the Feast of unleavened bread (Matzot). One occurs in the summer, this is the Feast of Weeks (Shavuot). And four occur in the fall in the seventh month. Feast of Trumpets (Yom Teru'ah) on the first day of the seventh month; the second is the Day of Atonement (Yom Kippur); and two during the Feast of Tabernacles (Sukkot) on the first and last day. Sometimes the word shabbaton is extended to mean all seven festivals.

The Gospel of John says of the day beginning following Christ's death, "that sabbath day was a high day" (19:31–42). That night was Nisan 15, just after the first day of Passover week (Unleavened Bread) and an annual miqra and rest day, in most chronologies. (In other systems, it was Nisan 13 or 14, i.e., weekly but not annual Sabbath.) The King James Version may thus be the origin of naming the annual rest days "High Sabbaths" in English.

=== As coincidental with weekly Sabbaths ===
High Sabbaths are considered by Seventh-day Adventists to be a subset of the feast sabbaths. In their view, only those feast sabbaths that coincide with the weekly Sabbath are regarded as High Sabbaths. Many other Sabbath-keeping Christian groups keep the High Sabbaths, and rules for the High Sabbath supersede the rules for the weekly Sabbath, should that high day fall on a weekly sabbath day. These are not considered "Jewish days", but are recognized as "God's Holy Days", according to Leviticus 23.

== High Holy Days ==
The ten-day period between the High Sabbaths of Rosh Hashanah and Yom Kippur inclusive is commonly referred to as the High Holy Days.
