= Church of God of the Abrahamic Faith =

Church of God of the Abrahamic Faith may refer to the following two modern Christian groups that had the same origin (founded by Benjamin Wilson (biblical scholar)) and common history from the 1850s to 1921:

- Church of God General Conference (Abrahamic Faith) or "CoGGC"
- Church of the Blessed Hope or "CGAF" (associated with Christadelphians)
