= Nontrinitarianism =

Rejection of the Christian doctrine of the Trinity

Nontrinitarianism is a form of Christianity that does not adhere to the Christian theology of the Trinity—the belief that God is three distinct hypostases or persons who are coeternal, coequal, and indivisibly united in one being, or essence (from the Ancient Greek ousia). Certain religious groups that emerged during the Protestant Reformation have historically been known as antitrinitarian.

According to churches that consider the decisions of ecumenical councils final, trinitarianism was definitively declared to be Christian doctrine at the 4th-century ecumenical councils, that of the First Council of Nicaea (325), which declared the full divinity of the Son, and the First Council of Constantinople (381), which declared the divinity of the Holy Spirit.

In terms of number of adherents, nontrinitarian denominations comprise approximately 3% of modern Christians. The largest nontrinitarian Christian groups are the Oneness Pentecostal movement, The Church of Jesus Christ of Latter-day Saints, Jehovah's Witnesses, La Luz del Mundo, and Iglesia ni Cristo. Smaller groups include Christadelphians, Church of the Blessed Hope, Christian Scientists, Dawn Bible Students, Living Church of God, Assemblies of Yahweh, Members Church of God International, Unitarian Christians, Unitarian Universalist Christians, The Way International, the Philadelphia Church of God, The Church of God International, the United Church of God, Church of God General Conference, Restored Church of God, Christian Disciples Church, and Church of God of the Faith of Abraham.

Nontrinitarian views differ widely on the nature of God, Jesus, and the Holy Spirit. Various nontrinitarian philosophies, such as adoptionism and monarchianism, existed prior to the codification of the Trinity doctrine in AD 325, 381, and 431, at the Councils of Nicaea, Constantinople, and Ephesus. Nontrinitarianism was later renewed by Cathars in the 11th through 13th centuries, in the Unitarian movement during the Protestant Reformation, in the Age of Enlightenment of the 18th century, and in some groups arising during the Second Great Awakening of the 19th century.

The doctrine of the Trinity, as held in mainstream Christianity, is not present in the other major monotheistic Abrahamic religions. Also some mainstream trinitarian Christians dispute labeling nontrinitarian groups as members within Christianity. However, unitarian Christians have long been found in some mainline Protestant churches. In the Church of England, Thomas Firmin in the 17th century, Bishop John Colenso in the 19th century and Professor G.W.H.Lampe could be called unitarian Christians.

== Beliefs ==
Christian apologists and other Church Fathers of the 2nd and 3rd centuries, having adopted and formulated the Logos Christology, considered the Son of God as the instrument used by the supreme God, the Father, to bring the creation into existence. Justin Martyr, Theophilus of Antioch, Hippolytus of Rome and Tertullian in particular state that the internal Logos of God (Gr. Logos endiathetos, Lat. ratio)—his impersonal divine reason—was begotten as Logos uttered (Gr. Logos prophorikos, Lat. sermo, verbum), the Word personified, becoming an actual person to be used for the purpose of creation.

The Encyclopædia Britannica Eleventh Edition (1910-1911) states: "to some Christians the doctrine of the Trinity appeared inconsistent with the unity of God. ... they therefore denied it, and accepted Jesus Christ, not as incarnate God, but as God's highest creature by whom all else was created. ... [this] view in the early Church long contended with the orthodox doctrine." Although the Trinitarian view became the orthodox doctrine in mainstream Christianity, variations of the nontrinitarian view are still held by a relatively small number of Christian groups and denominations.

Various views exist regarding the relationships between the Father, Son, and Holy Spirit.

- Those who believe that Jesus is not Almighty God, nor absolutely equal to God, and not the co-eternal or co-equal with Father in everything, but was either God's subordinate Son and Servant, the highest Angel and Son of God that eventually became a perfect Man, God's true firstborn before ages, a perfect messenger sent from God, the greatest prophet of Israel, and the Jewish Messiah, or the perfect created human:
  - Adoptionism (2nd century AD) holds that Jesus became divine at his baptism (sometimes associated with the Gospel of Mark) or at his resurrection (sometimes associated with Saint Paul and Shepherd of Hermas);
  - Arianism – Arius (AD c. 250 or 256–336) believed that the pre-existent Son of God was directly created by the Father, before all ages, and that he was subordinate to God the Father. Arius' position was that the Son was brought forth as the very first of God's creations, and that the Father later created all things through the Son. Arius taught that in the creation of the universe, the Father was the ultimate creator, supplying all the materials and directing the design, while the Son worked the materials, making all things at the bidding and in the service of God, by which "through [Christ] all things came into existence". Arianism became the dominant view in some regions in the time of the Roman Empire, notably the Visigoths until 589. The Third Council of Sirmium in 357 was the high point of Arianism. The Seventh Arian Confession (Second Sirmium Confession) held that both homoousios (of one substance) and homoiousios (of similar substance) were unbiblical and that the Father is greater than the Son in all things, and that the Father alone is infinite and eternal, and that the Logos is God's true firstborn and subservient Son who was made perfect flesh for our sakes and for the glory of the Father (this confession was later known as the Blasphemy of Sirmium): "But since many persons are disturbed by questions concerning what is called in Latin substantia, but in Greek ousia, that is, to make it understood more exactly, as to 'coessential,' or what is called, 'like-in-essence,' there ought to be no mention of any of these at all, nor exposition of them in the Church, for this reason and for this consideration, that in divine Scripture nothing is written about them, and that they are above men's knowledge and above men's understanding";
  - Psilanthropism – Ebionites (1st to 4th centuries AD) observed Jewish law, denied the literal virgin birth and regarded Jesus as the Jewish Messiah and the greatest prophet of God only;
  - Socinianism – Photinus taught that Jesus was the sinless Messiah and redeemer, and the only perfect human son of God, but that he had no pre-human existence. They interpret verses such as John 1:1 to refer to God's "plan" existing in God's mind before Christ's birth, and that it was God's plan that "became flesh", as the perfect man Jesus;
  - Unitarianism views Jesus as the son of God, subordinate and distinct from his Father;
  - Many Gnostic traditions held that the Christ is a heavenly Aeon but not one with the Father.
- Those who believe that the Father, the resurrected Son and the Holy Spirit are different aspects of one God, as perceived by the believer, rather than three distinct persons:
  - Modalism – Sabellius (fl. c. 215) stated that God took numerous forms in both the Hebrew and the Christian Greek Scriptures, and that God has manifested himself in three primary modes regarding the salvation of mankind. He contended that "Father, Son, and Spirit" were different roles played by the same divine person in various circumstances in history; thus God is Father in creation (God created a Son through the virgin birth), Son in redemption (God manifested himself as Jesus for the purpose of his death upon the cross), and Holy Spirit in regeneration (God's Spirit within the Son and within the souls of Christian believers). In this view, God is not three distinct persons, but rather one person manifesting himself in multiple ways. Trinitarians condemn this view as a heresy. The chief critic of Sabellianism was Tertullian, who labeled the movement "Patripassianism", from the Latin words pater for "father", and passus from the verb "to suffer", because it implied that the Father suffered on the cross. It was coined by Tertullian in his work Adversus Praxeas, Chapter I: "By this Praxeas did a twofold service for the devil at Rome: he drove away prophecy, and he brought in heresy; he put to flight the Paraclete, and he crucified the Father." The term homoousion (ὁμοούσιον, literally same being) later adopted by the Trinitarian Nicene Council for its anti-Arian creed had previously been used by Sabellians.
- Those who believe that Jesus Christ is Almighty God, but that the Father, Son, and Holy Spirit are actually three distinct almighty "Gods" with distinct natures, acting as one divine group, united in purpose:
  - Tri-theism – John Philoponus, an Aristotelian and monophysite in Alexandria, in the middle of the 6th century, saw in the Trinity three separate natures, substances, and deities, according to the number of divine persons. He sought to justify this view by the Aristotelian categories of genus, species and individuum. In the Middle Ages, Roscellin of Compiegne, the founder of Nominalism, argued for three distinct almighty Gods, with three distinct natures, who were one in mind and purpose, existing together eternally, interacting together from times past, in perfect cooperation, acting together as one divine group or godhead over the universe, in creation and redemption. And that the Logos took on a subservient role, but was equal in power and eternity with the One called Father. Roscellin said, though, like Philoponus, that unless the three persons are tres res (three things with distinct natures), the whole Trinity must have been incarnate. And therefore, since only the Logos was made flesh, the other two persons must have had distinct "natures", separate from the Logos, and so had to be separate and distinct Gods, though all three were one in divine work and plan and operation. In this view, they would be considered "three Gods in one Godhead". This notion was condemned by St. Anselm.
- Those who believe that the Holy Spirit is not a person:
  - Binitarianism – Adherents include those people through history who believed that God is only two co-equal and co-eternal persons, the Father and the Word, not three. They taught that the Holy Spirit is not a distinct person, but is the power or divine influence of the Father and Son, emanating out to the universe, in creation, and to believers;
  - Dualism;
  - Marcionism – Marcion (AD c. 110–160) believed there were two deities, one of creation and judgment (in the Hebrew Bible) and one of redemption and mercy (in the New Testament).

=== Modern Christian groups ===
- Christadelphians hold the unitarian belief that although Jesus is the Son of God, this is only a relational title toward the Father who alone is truly God. Christ's personhood, therefore, is human, not divine, (believing this to be necessary in order to save humans from their sins). The "Holy Spirit" terminology in the Bible is interpreted as referring to God's impersonal power, or God's character/mind (depending on the context).
- Church of God General Conference (Abrahamic Faith).
- The Cooneyites is a Christian sect that split from the Two by Twos in 1928 following Edward Cooney's excommunication from the main group; they deny the Living Witness Doctrine.
- Iglesia ni Cristo (Tagalog for Church of Christ) views Jesus as human but endowed by God with attributes not found in ordinary humans, though lacking attributes found in God. They contend that it is God's will to worship Jesus. INC rejects the Trinity as heresy, adopting a version of unitarianism.
- Jehovah's Witnesses (and other Bible Student movement groups such as the Associated Bible Students) teach that God the Father is uniquely Almighty God. They believe that Jesus is God's first and only direct creation, and that God is greater than Jesus. They contrast worship of God with relative "obeisance" (in the sense of homage, as to a king) to Jesus, and consider Jesus to be God's high priest and mediator for imperfect humans. They believe that Jesus is Michael the archangel and the "Angel of the Lord" of Exodus, and that he left heaven to be born as a perfect human, and then resumed his pre-human identity in heaven, but exalted to God's right hand. They do not believe that the Holy Spirit is an actual person, but consider it to be God's divine active force.
- The Church of Jesus Christ of Latter-day Saints (LDS Church) teaches that the Father, Son, and Holy Spirit are distinct beings that are not united in substance, a view sometimes called social trinitarianism. They believe the three individual deities are "one" in will or purpose, as Jesus was "one" with his disciples, and that the Father, Son, and Holy Spirit constitute a single godhead united in purpose and indistinguishable in doctrine. Latter-day Saints believe that Christ is the Firstborn of the Father, that he is subordinate to God the Father (Matthew 26:39), and that Christ created the universe. Latter-day Saints do not subscribe to the ideas that Christ was unlike the Father in substance and that the Father could not appear on earth, or that Christ was adopted by the Father, as presented in Arianism. Latter-day Saints assert that both God and the resurrected Christ have perfected glorified, physical bodies, but do not otherwise classify deity in terms of substance. While Latter-day Saints regard God the Father as the supreme being and literal father of the spirits of all humankind, they also teach that Christ and the Holy Spirit are equally divine and that they share in the Father's "comprehension of all things".
- The Members Church of God International believes in the divinity of Christ but rejects the doctrine of Trinity.
- Oneness Pentecostalism is a subset of Pentecostalism that believes God is only one person, and that he manifests himself in different ways, faces, or "modes": "Father, Son, and Holy Spirit (or Holy Ghost) are different designations for the one God. God is the Father. God is the Holy Spirit. The Son is God manifest in flesh. The term Son always refers to the Incarnation, and never to deity apart from humanity." Oneness Pentecostals believe that Jesus was "Son" only when he became flesh on earth, but was the Father prior to being made human. They refer to the Father as the "Spirit" and the Son as the "Flesh". Oneness Pentecostals reject the Trinity doctrine, viewing it as pagan and unscriptural, and hold to the Jesus' Name doctrine with respect to baptisms. Oneness Pentecostals are often referred to as "Modalists" or "Sabellians" or "Jesus Only".
- Denominations within the Sabbatarian tradition (Armstrongism) believe that Christ the Son and God the Father are co-eternal, but do not teach that the Holy Spirit is a being or person. Armstrong theology holds that God is a "Family" that expands eventually, that "God reproduces Himself", but that originally there was a co-eternal "Duality", God and the Word, rather than a "Trinity".
- Swedenborgianism holds that the Trinity exists in one person, the Lord God Jesus Christ. The Father, the being or soul of God, was born into the world and put on a body from Mary. Throughout his life, Jesus put away all human desires and tendencies until he was completely divine. After his resurrection, he influences the world through the Holy Spirit, which is his activity. In this view, Jesus Christ is the one God; the Father as to his soul, the Son as to his body, and the Holy Spirit as to his activity in the world. This view is very similar in many ways to Sabellianism, Modalism, Oneness, or Jesus Only beliefs.
- Numerous Unitarian Christian organizations exist around the world, the oldest of which is the Unitarian Church of Transylvania. An umbrella organization for these groups is the International Council of Unitarians and Universalists, though only some members and affiliates of that body consider themselves exclusively or predominantly Christian. In the United States, "Unitarian" often refers to members and congregations within the Unitarian Universalist Association (UUA), which is a group that is not exclusively Christian and formed in 1961 from the merger of the American Unitarian Association with the Universalist Church of America. Though both of these predecessor groups were originally Christian, the UUA does not have a shared creed and does not identify as a Christian Unitarian organization.

== History ==
=== Early Christianity ===
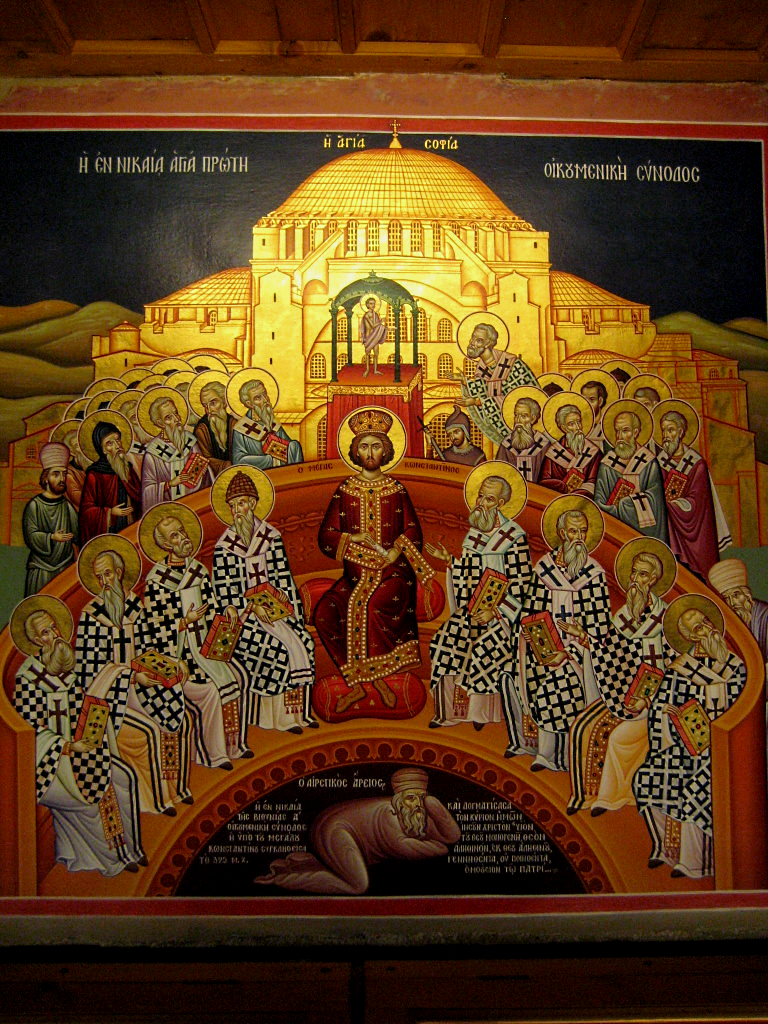
The First Council of Nicaea depicted with Arius beneath the feet of Emperor Constantine and the bishops

Although nontrinitarian beliefs continued and were dominant among some peoples—for example, the Lombards, Ostrogoths, Visigoths and Vandals—for hundreds of years, the Trinity doctrine eventually gained prominence in the Roman Empire. Nontrinitarians typically argue that early nontrinitarian beliefs, such as Arianism, were systematically suppressed (often to the point of death). After the First Council of Nicaea, Roman Emperor Constantine I issued an edict against Arius' writings, which included systematic book burning. In spite of the decree, Constantine ordered the readmission of Arius to the church, removed the bishops (including Athanasius) who upheld the teaching of Nicaea, allowed Arianism to grow within the Empire and to spread to Germanic tribes on the frontier, and was himself baptized by an Arian bishop, Eusebius of Nicomedia. His successors as Christian emperors promoted Arianism, until Theodosius I came to the throne in 379 and supported Nicene Christianity.

The Easter letter that Athanasius issued in 367, when the Eastern Empire was ruled by the Arian Emperor Valens, specified the books that belong to the Old Testament and the New Testament, together with seven other books to be read "for instruction in the word of godliness"; it also excluded what Athanasius called apocryphal writings, falsely presented as ancient. Elaine Pagels writes: "In AD 367, Athanasius, the zealous bishop of Alexandria... issued an Easter letter in which he demanded that Egyptian monks destroy all such unacceptable writings, except for those he specifically listed as 'acceptable' even 'canonical'—a list that constitutes the present 'New Testament'".

Nontrinitarians see the Nicene Creed and the results of the Council of Chalcedon as essentially political documents, resulting from the subordination of true doctrine to state interests by leaders of the Catholic Church, so that the church became, in their view, an extension of the Roman Empire. Nontrinitarians (both Modalists and Unitarians) assert that Athanasius and others at Nicaea adopted Greek Platonic philosophy and concepts, and incorporated them in their views of God and Christ.

The author H. G. Wells, later famous for his contribution to science-fiction, wrote in The Outline of History: "We shall see presently how later on all Christendom was torn by disputes about the Trinity. There is no evidence that the apostles of Jesus ever heard of the Trinity, at any rate from him."

The question of why such a central doctrine to the Christian faith would never have been explicitly stated in scripture or taught in detail by Jesus himself was sufficiently important to 16th century historical figures such as Michael Servetus to lead them to argue the question. The Geneva City Council, in accord with the judgment of the cantons of Zürich, Bern, Basel, and Schaffhausen, condemned Servetus to be burned at the stake for this and his opposition to infant baptism.

The Encyclopædia of Religion and Ethics describes the five stages that led to the formulation of the doctrine of the Trinity:

1. The acceptance of the pre-human existence of Jesus as the (middle-platonic) Logos, namely, as the medium between the transcendent sovereign God and the created cosmos. The doctrine of Logos was accepted by the Apologists and by other Fathers of the 2nd and 3rd centuries, such as Justin the Martyr, Hippolytus, Tertullian, Ireneus, Clement of Alexandria, Origen, Lactantius, and in the 4th century by Arius;
2. The doctrine of the timeless generation of the Son from the Father as it was articulated by Origen in his effort to support the ontological immutability of God, that he is ever-being a father and a creator. The doctrine of the timeless generation was adopted by Athanasius of Alexandria;
3. The acceptance of the idea that the son of God is of the same transcendent nature (homoousios) as his father. This position was declared in the Nicene Creed, which specifically states the son of God is as immutable as his father;
4. The acceptance that the Holy Spirit also has ontological equality as a third person in a divine Trinity and the final Trinitarian terminology by the teachings of the Cappadocian Fathers;
5. The addition of the Filioque to the Nicene Creed, as accepted by the Roman Catholic Church.

=== 7th-century Islam ===
Among proponents of the revisionist school of Islamic studies positions viewing early Islam as a unitarian Christian group have found a number of academic supporters, such as Günter Lüling, who argues the original Quran was a unitarian Christian text opposed to the trinity. Along similar lines Karl-Heinz Ohlig has suggested that the person of Muhammad was not central to early Islam at all, and that early stage Islam was an Arabic Christian sect which had objections to the concept of the trinity, and that the later hadith and biographies are in large part legends, instrumental in severing Islam from its Christian roots and building a full-blown new religion. Volker Popp supports Ohlig's thesis based on archeological evidence. Édouard-Marie Gallez believes early Islam to have been a development within the unitarian anti-Nicene Judeo-Christian Nazarene sect of Christianity. A related thesis to the aforementioned ones is advanced by Fred Donner who argues that early Islam was a interfaith unitarian Believers Movement addressed to both Christians and Jews.

In pre-modern writing, John of Damascus described Islam as a Christian heresy led by Muhammad, whom he deems an Arian based on his (assumed) denial of the trinity.

=== Following the Reformation ===
By 1530, following the Protestant Reformation, and the German Peasants' War of 1524–1525, large areas of Northern Europe were Protestant, and forms of nontrinitarianism began to surface among some "Radical Reformation" groups, particularly Anabaptists. The first recorded English antitrinitarian was John Assheton (1548), an Anglican priest. The Italian Anabaptist "Council of Venice" (1550) and the trial of Michael Servetus (1553) marked the clear emergence of markedly antitrinitarian Protestants. Though the only organised nontrinitarian churches were the Polish Brethren who split from the Calvinists (1565, expelled from Poland 1658), and the Unitarian Church of Transylvania (founded 1568).

In 1733, Voltaire's Letters on the English listed Isaac Newton as a member of Antitrinitarians.

Nonconformists, Dissenters and Latitudinarians in Britain were often Arians or Unitarians, and the Doctrine of the Trinity Act 1813 allowed nontrinitarian worship in Britain. In America, Arian and Unitarian views were also found among some Millennialist and Adventist groups, though the Unitarian Church itself began to decline in numbers and influence after the 1870s.

== Points of dissent ==
Nontrinitarian Christians with Arian or Semi-Arian views contend that the weight of scriptural evidence supports Subordinationism, the Son's total submission to the Father, and God's paternal supremacy over the Son in every aspect. They acknowledge the Son's high rank at God's right hand, but teach that the Father is still greater than the Son in all things.

While acknowledging that the Father, Son, and Spirit are essential in creation and salvation, they argue that that in itself does not confirm that the three are each co-equal or co-eternal. They also affirm that God is only explicitly identified as "one" in the Bible, and that the doctrine of the Trinity, a word literally meaning a set of three, ascribes a co-equal threeness to the being of the infinite God that is not explicitly scriptural.

=== Scriptural support ===
Critics of the Trinity doctrine argue that, for a teaching described as fundamental, it lacks direct scriptural support. Proponents of the doctrine assert that although the doctrine is not stated directly in the New Testament, it is instead an interpretation of elements contained therein that imply the doctrine that was later formulated in the 4th century.

William Barclay, a Church of Scotland minister, stated that:

It is important and helpful to remember that the word Trinity is not itself a New Testament word. It is even true in at least one sense to say that the doctrine of the Trinity is not directly New Testament doctrine. It is rather a deduction from and an interpretation of the thought and the language of the New Testament.

The New Catholic Encyclopedia states:

The doctrine of the Holy Trinity is not taught [explicitly] in the [Old Testament] [...] The formulation 'one God in three Persons' was not solidly established [by a council] [...] prior to the end of the 4th century.

Similarly, Encyclopedia Encarta states:

The doctrine is not taught explicitly in the New Testament, where the word God almost invariably refers to the Father. [...] The term trinitas was first used in the 2nd century, by the Latin theologian Tertullian, but the concept was developed in the course of the debates on the nature of Christ [...] In the 4th century, the doctrine was finally formulated.

Encyclopædia Britannica says:

Neither the word Trinity nor the explicit doctrine appears in the New Testament, nor did Jesus and his followers intend to contradict the Shema in the Old Testament: "Hear, O Israel: The Lord our God is one Lord" (Deuteronomy 6:4). [...] The doctrine developed gradually over several centuries and through many controversies. [...] by the end of the 4th century, under the leadership of Basil of Caesarea, Gregory of Nyssa, and Gregory of Nazianzus (the Cappadocian Fathers), the doctrine of the Trinity took substantially the form it has maintained ever since.

The Anchor Bible Dictionary states:

One does not find in the NT the trinitarian paradox of the coexistence of the Father, Son, and Spirit within a divine unity.

Catholic historian Joseph F. Kelly, speaking of legitimate theological development, writes:

The Bible may not use the word 'Trinity', but it refers to God the Father frequently; the Gospel of John emphasized the divinity of the Son; several New Testament books treat the Holy Spirit as divine. The ancient theologians did not violate biblical teaching but sought to develop its implications. [...] [Arius'] potent arguments forced other Christians to refine their thinking about the Trinity. At two ecumenical councils, Nicea I in 325 and Constantinople I in 381, the church at large defined the Trinity in the way now so familiar to us from the Nicene Creed. This exemplifies development of doctrine at its best. The Bible may not use the word 'Trinity', but trinitarian theology does not go against the Bible. On the contrary, Catholics believe that trinitarianism has carefully developed a biblical teaching for later generations.

=== Questions about co-equal deity of Jesus ===
American Catholic priest and Trinitarian R.E. Brown (1928–1988) wrote a journal article that sorted relevant biblical verses into three classes. He described the following block as "texts that seem to imply that the title 'God' was not used for Jesus" and are "negative evidence which is often somewhat neglected in Catholic treatments of the subject":

- Mark 10:18, Matthew 27:46, John 20:17, Ephesians 1:17, 2 Corinthians 1:3, 1 Peter 1:3, John 17:3, 1 Corinthians 8:6, Ephesians 4:4–6, 1 Corinthians 12:4–6, 2 Corinthians 13:14, 1 Timothy 2:5, John 14:28, Mark 13:32, Philippians 2:5–10, and 1 Corinthians 15:24–28;

he lists these as "texts where, by reason of textual variants or syntax, the use of 'God' for Jesus is dubious":

- Gal 2:20, Acts 20:28, John 1:18, Colossians 2:2, 2 Thessalonians 1:12, 1John 5:20, Romans 9:5, and 2 Peter 1:1;

and only finds the following three as "texts where clearly Jesus is called God":

- Hebrews 1:8–9, John 1:1, and John 20:28.

The Septuagint translate אלוהים (Elohim) as θεος (Theos). At Deuteronomy 6:4 (the Shema Yisrael, quoted by Jesus at Mark 12:29), the plural form of the Hebrew word "God" (Elohim) is used, generally understood to denote majesty, excellence, and the superlative. It has been stated that in the original Greek in Mark 12:29, there are no "plural modifiers" in that Greek word there for "one" (heis), but that in Mark 12 it is simply a masculine singular "one". And that because of that, there is no valid reason to believe that the Hebrew word for "one" in Deuteronomy 6 (echad) was necessarily a "plural one", rather than just simply numerical "one". At Deuteronomy 6:4, the Tetragrammaton appears twice in this verse, leading Jehovah's Witnesses and certain Jewish scholars to conclude that belief in a singular (and therefore indivisible) supremely powerful God is essential to the Shema.

==== Matthew 26:39 ====
In Matthew 26:39 Jesus prays with a distinction between God and himself, "O my Father, if it be possible, let this cup pass from me: nevertheless not as I will, but as thou wilt.".

==== John 1:1 ====
In John 1:1 there is a distinction between God and the Logos. Non-trinitarians claim a mistranslation of the second part of John 1:1 which, when literally translated word-for-word reads "and the word [logos] was with the God [ho theos]." Trinitarians contend that the third part of the verse (John 1:1c) translates as "and the Word was God", pointing to a distinction as subjects between God and the Logos but an equivalence in nature. Some nontrinitarians assert that the Koine Greek (kai theos ên ho logos) should be translated as "and a God was the Word" (or "and the Word was a god"). Based on their contention that the article of theos is anarthrous, lacking a definite article, they believe the verse refers to Jesus' pre-human existence as "a god" or a divine one as distinct from "the God". Nontrinitarians also contend that the author of John's gospel could have written kai ho theos ên ho logos ("and the Word was the God") if that were his intended meaning.

==== John 10:30 ====
John 10:30 – Nontrinitarians such as Arians believe that when Jesus said, "I and the Father are one," he did not mean that they were actually "one substance", or "one God", or co-equal and co-eternal, but rather that he and the Father have a "unity of purpose", and that the context indicates that Jesus was saying that they were "one" in pastoral work. The point being that the Father and the Son were united in the divine work of saving the 'sheep'. Nontrinitarian Christians also cite John 17:21, wherein Jesus prayed regarding his disciples: "That they may all be one, as you, Father, are in me, and I in you, that they may be in us," adding "that they may be one even as we are one". They argue that the same Greek word (hen) for "one" throughout John 17 indicates that Jesus did not expect for his followers to literally become a single Being, or "one in substance", with each other, or with God, and therefore that Jesus also did not expect his hearers to think that he and God the Father were one entity either.

==== John 10:33 ====
While Trinitarians often use John 10:33 as proof for the divinity of Jesus, unitarian critics argue that the Pharisees accusing Jesus of making himself God should not be the center of attention, when reading this passage. Instead, they emphasize that Jesus' response to the accusations in John 10:34-36 is of much greater concern. In fact, he refuses to be God but instead claims to be the son of God and makes a direct reference to Psalms 82:6 in which God calls his children Gods without taking away from his own glory.

==== John 20:28–29 ====
John 20:28–29 – "And Thomas answered and said to Him, "My Lord and my God!" Jesus said to him, "Thomas, because you have seen Me, you have believed. Blessed are those who have not seen and yet have believed"". Since Thomas called Jesus God, Jesus's statement appears to endorse Thomas's assertion. Nontrinitarians sometimes respond that it is plausible that Thomas is addressing the Lord Jesus and then the Father. Another possible answer is that Jesus himself said, "Is it not written in your law, I said, Ye are gods?" (John 10:34) referring to Psalm 82:6–8. The word "gods" in verse 6 and "God" in verse 8 is the same Hebrew word "'elohim", which means, "gods in the ordinary sense; but specifically used (in the plural thus, especially with the article) of the supreme God; occasionally applied by way of deference to magistrates; and sometimes as a superlative", and can also refer to powers and potentates, in general, or as "God, god, gods, rulers, judges or angels", and as "divine ones, goddess, godlike one". Therefore, the point being that Jesus was a power or mighty one to the Apostles, as the resurrected Messiah, and as the reflection of God the Father.

==== 2 Corinthians 13:14 ====
2 Corinthians 13:14 – "The Grace of the Lord Jesus Christ and the love of God and the sharing in the Holy Spirit be with all of you." It is argued by Trinitarians that the appearance of "Father, Son, and Spirit" together in Paul's prayer for Grace on all believers, and are considered essential for salvation, that the verse is consistent with a triune godhead. Nontrinitarians such as Arians reply that they do not disagree that all three are necessary for salvation and grace, but argue that the passage does not explicitly say that all three are co-equal or co-eternal.

==== Philippians 2:5–6 ====
Philippians 2:5–6 – "Have this mind among yourselves, which is yours in Christ Jesus, [or "which was also in Christ Jesus",] who, though he was in the form of God, did not count equality with God a thing to be grasped" (ESV). The word translated in the English Standard Version as "a thing to be grasped" is ἁρπαγμόν. Other translations of the word are indicated in the Holman Christian Standard Bible: "Make your own attitude that of Christ Jesus, who, existing in the form of God, did not consider equality with God as something to be used for His own advantage" [or "to be grasped", or "to be held on to"]. The King James Version has: "Let this mind be in you, which was also in Christ Jesus: Who, being in the form of God, thought it not robbery to be equal with God." Nontrinitarians make the argument that the passage is simply saying that Christ did not consider equality with God something graspable, and that better English translations make it clearer. Another point is that the original Greek had no definite article for "form of God", which would mean "a form of divinity", and also that the term "morphe" for "form" in Koine Greek would simply mean a general external quality or station, but not necessarily the absolute thing itself, and therefore they argue that the passage does not explicitly teach either co-equality, co-eternity, or consubstantiality.

==== Hebrews 9:14 ====
Hebrews 9:14 – "How much more will the Blood of Christ, who through an eternal Spirit, offered himself without blemish to God, cleanse our consciences from dead works, that we may render sacred service to the living God?" Most nontrinitarians agree that the Holy Spirit had no beginning, but believe it is not an actual person. Nontrinitarians contend that it is obvious that God the Father in the passage is the One who is ultimately reached, and therefore is greater than the other two entities, and that a "co-equal trinity" is not explicitly taught in the passage, but only inferred.

=== Terminology ===
"The term 'Trinity' is not in the Bible", and some nontrinitarians use this as an argument to state that the doctrine of the Trinity relies on non-biblical terminology, and that the number three is never clearly associated with God necessarily, other than within the Comma Johanneum which is of spurious or disputed authenticity. They argue that the only number clearly unambiguously ascribed to God in the Bible is one, and that the Trinity, literally meaning three-in-one, ascribes a co-equal threeness to God that is not explicitly biblical.

Nontrinitarians cite other examples of terms or phrases not found in the Bible; multiple "persons" in relation to God, the terms "God the Son", "God-Man", "God the Holy Spirit", "eternal Son", and "eternally begotten". While the Trinitarian term hypostasis is found in the Bible, it is used only once in reference to God where it states that Jesus is the express image of God's person. The Bible does not explicitly use the term in relation to the Holy Spirit nor explicitly mentions the Son having a distinct hypostasis from the Father.

The First Council of Nicaea included in its Creed the major term homoousios (of the same essence), which was used also by the Council of Chalcedon to speak of a double consubstantiality of Christ, "consubstantial with the Father as touching his Godhead, and consubstantial with us as touching his manhood". Nontrinitarians accept what Pier Franco Beatrice wrote: "The main thesis of this paper is that homoousios came straight from Constantine's Hermetic background. ... The Plato recalled by Constantine is just a name used to cover precisely the Egyptian and Hermetic theology of the "consubstantiality" of the Logos-Son with the Nous-Father, having recourse to a traditional apologetic argument. In the years of the outbreak of the Arian controversy, Lactantius might have played a decisive role in influencing Constantine's Hermetic interpretation of Plato's theology and consequently the emperor's decision to insert homoousios in the Creed of Nicaea."

Trinitarians see the absence of the actual word "Trinity" and other Trinity-related terms in the Bible as no more significant than the absence in the Bible of the words "monotheism", "omnipotence", "oneness", "Pentecostal", "apostolic", "incarnation" and even "Bible" itself. They maintain that, 'while the word Trinity is not in the Bible, the substance or drift of the doctrine is definitely biblical, if not explicitly than at least implicitly.'

=== Holy Spirit ===
Nontrinitarian views about the Holy Spirit differ from mainstream Christian doctrine and generally fall into several distinct categories. Most scriptures traditionally used in support of the Trinity refer to the Father and the Son, but not to the Holy Spirit.

==== Unitarian ====
Groups with Unitarian theology such as Polish Socinians, the 18th–19th-century Unitarian Church and Christadelphians consider the Holy Spirit to be an aspect of God's power rather than a person. Christadelphians believe that the phrase Holy Spirit refers to God's power or character, depending on the context. Similarly, Jehovah's Witnesses believe that the Holy Spirit is not an actual person but is God's "active force" that he uses to accomplish his will.

==== Binitarianism ====
Groups with Binitarian theology, such as Armstrongites, believe that the Logos and God the Father are co-equal and co-eternal, but they do not believe that the Holy Spirit is an actual person, like the Father and the Son. They believe the Holy Spirit is the Power, Mind, or Character of God, depending on the context. They teach, "The Holy Spirit is the very essence, the mind, life and power of God. It is not a Being. The Spirit is inherent in the Father and the Son, and emanates from Them throughout the entire universe."

==== Modalist groups ====
Oneness Pentecostalism, as with other modalist groups, teach that the Holy Spirit is a mode of God, rather than a distinct or separate person in the godhead, and that the Holy Spirit is another name for God the Father. According to Oneness theology, the Holy Spirit is the Father operating in a certain capacity or manifestation. The United Pentecostal Church teaches that there is no personal distinction between God the Father, the Son, and the Holy Spirit. The two titles "Father" and "Holy Spirit" (as well as others) are said to not reflect separate "persons" within the Godhead, but rather two different ways in which the one God reveals himself to his creatures. The Oneness view of Bible verses that mention God and his Spirit (e.g. Isaiah 48:16) is that they do not imply two "persons" any more than various scriptural references to a man and his spirit or soul (such as in Luke 12:19) imply two "persons" existing within one body.

==== Latter-day Saint movement ====
In the LDS Church, the Holy Ghost (usually synonymous with Holy Spirit) is considered to be the third distinct member of the Godhead (Father, Son and Holy Ghost), and to have a body of "spirit", which makes him unlike the Father and the Son who are said to have bodies "as tangible as man's". According to LDS doctrine, the Holy Spirit is believed to be a person, with a body of spirit, able to pervade all worlds.

Latter-day Saints believe that the Father, the Son, and the Holy Ghost are part of the Godhead, but that the Father is greater than the Son, and that the Son is greater than the Holy Spirit in position and authority, but not in nature (i.e., they equally share the "God" nature). They teach that the Father, Son, and Spirit are three ontologically separate, self-aware entities who share a common "God" nature distinct from our "human" nature, who are "One God" in the sense of being united (in the same sense that a husband and wife are said to be "one"), similar to Social trinitarianism. Though three separate entities, the members of the Godhead are indistinguishable in doctrine and bringing to pass the Plan of Salvation.

A number of Latter Day Saint sects, most notably the Community of Christ (the second largest Latter Day Saint denomination), the Church of Christ (Temple Lot), and derived groups, follow a traditional Protestant trinitarian theology.

==== Other groups ====
The controversial Anglican bishop Robert Clayton (d. 1758) proposed that Michael was the Logos and Gabriel the Holy Spirit.

The Unity Church interprets the religious terms Father, Son, and Holy Spirit metaphysically, as three aspects of mind action: mind, idea, and expression. They believe this is the process through which all manifestation takes place.

Groups in the Rastafari movement generally state that it is Haile Selassie who embodies both God the Father and God the Son, while the Holy (or "Hola") Spirit is to be found within every human being. Rastas also say that the true church is the human body, and that it is this church (or "structure") that contains the Holy Spirit.

== Relationship with mainstream Christianity ==
As the Nicene Creed's declaration of the Trinity is held as the foundational belief for mainstream Christians, nontrinitarian sects may be regarded as cults or heresies by other Christians, or accused of not being Christians at all. On the other hand, nontrinitarians may see mainstream Christians as having fallen or apostasized from the original Christian church.

=== Ecumenism ===
Ecumenism is a type of interfaith dialogue within Christianity based on shared essential, core beliefs. Ecumenism is usually built on the basis of shared belief in trinitarian baptism, which by definition excludes nontrinitarians. This makes it especially difficult for trinitarian and nontrinitarian churches to recognize the other side's baptisms and communions, or for them to worship together. However, unity of action on shared community goals is easier to accomplish.

=== Heresy and apostasy ===
Orthodoxy sets certain beliefs as correct, by tradition. Beliefs not within those guidelines be designated heterodox or heretical. Many nontrinitarians believe that the traditions of mainstream Christianity itself are incorrect, in a Great Apostasy foretold by Paul.

The Catholic Church has specifically designated many varieties of nontrinitarianism "heresies", including Arianism, Modalism, and Tritheism. They have also specifically named Mormonism and Jehovah's Witnesses as heresies (as well as Protestantism and Calvinism).

Fundamentalist or evangelical Protestantism has also targeted some nontrinitarians as part of the Christian countercult movement. However, more cautious authors argue that strange beliefs alone are not enough to designate a "cult"; the group's behavior is a more important factor.

=== Specific groups' relationships with Nicene Christianity ===
==== Pentecostalism ====
Pentecostalism has a peculiar relationship with ecumenism. There is a theological division between Oneness and trinitarian Pentecostals, and ecumenical groups within Pentecostalism tend to follow those lines. However, many Pentecostals think of ecumenism less as a need for a formal, cooperative institution between groups, and more as a spiritual experience. In addition, many Pentecostal believers are insufficiently focused on abstract theology to identify as trinitarian or nontrinitarian.

==== Mormonism ====
Mormonism, particularly its largest sect, The Church of Jesus Christ of Latter-day Saints, has a complex relationship with mainstream Christianity, due in part to its nontrinitarianism. It also has other unusual doctrines, which lead many evangelical Christians to challenge its inclusion within Christianity.

Mormonism's second-largest sect, the Community of Christ, is a trinitarian group and participates in a variety of ecumenical organizations, such as the National Council of Churches of Christ.

== Inter-religious dialogue beyond Christianity ==
The Trinity doctrine is integral in inter-religious disagreements with the other two main Abrahamic religions, Judaism and Islam; the former rejects Jesus' divine mission entirely, and the latter accepts Jesus as a human prophet and the Messiah but not as the son of God, although accepting virgin birth. The rejection of the Trinity doctrine has led to comparisons between nontrinitarian theology and Judaism and Islam.

In an 1897 article in the Jewish Quarterly Review, Montefiore describes Unitarianism as a bridge between Judaism and mainstream Christianity, calling it both a "phase of Judaism" and a "phase of Christianity".

In Islam, the concept of a co-equal trinity is totally rejected, with Quranic verses calling the doctrine of the Trinity blasphemous. Early Islam was originally seen as a variant of Arianism, a heresy in Orthodox and Catholic Christianity, by the Byzantine emperor in the 600s. In the 700s, many Arians in Spain considered Muhammad a prophet. In the mid-1500s, many Socinian unitarians were suspected of having Islamic leanings. Socinians praised Islam, though considering the Qur'an to contain errors, for its belief in the unity of God. Bilal Cleland claimed that "an anonymous writer" in A Letter of Resolution concerning the Doctrine of the Trinity and Incarnation (1693) states that Islam's greater number of adherents and military supremacy resulted from more closely maintaining correct doctrine than mainstream Christianity.

== Arguments for the pagan origins of the Trinity ==
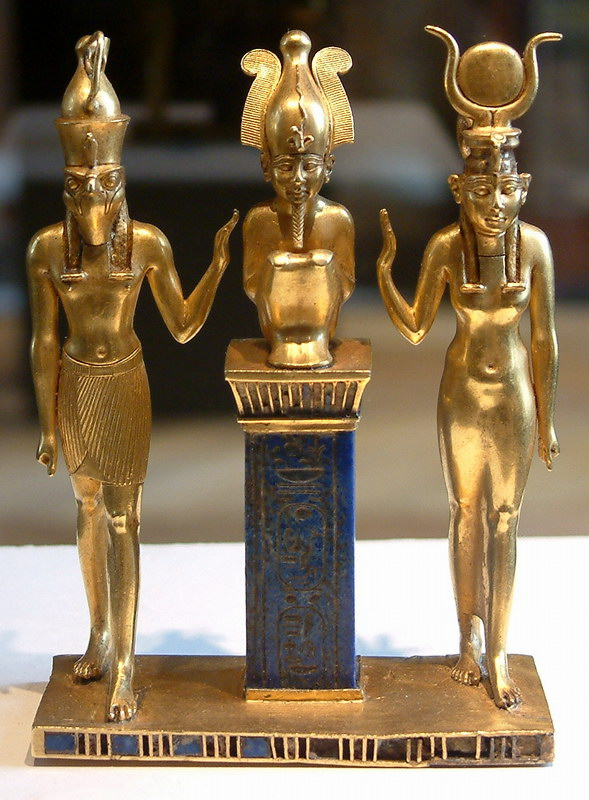
Horus, Osiris, and Isis

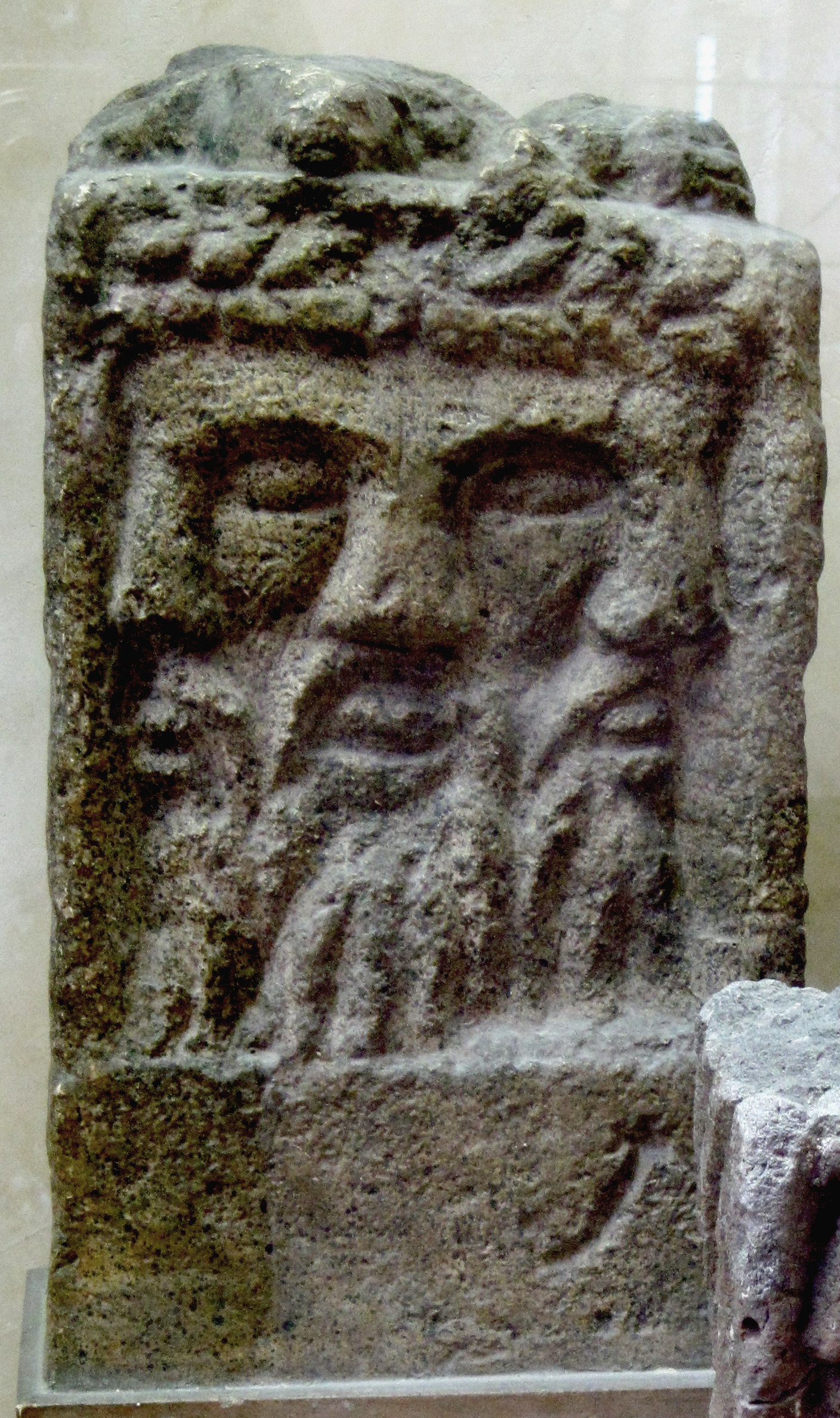
Reims altar depicting a tricephalic Celtic god

Some nontrinitarians also say that a link between the doctrine of the Trinity and the Egyptian Christian theologians of Alexandria suggests that Alexandrian theology, with its strong emphasis on the deity of Jesus, served to infuse Egypt's pagan religious heritage into Christianity. They accuse the Church of adopting these Egyptian tenets after adapting them to Christian thinking by means of Greek philosophy.

They say the development of the idea of a co-equal triune godhead was based on pagan Greek and Platonic influence, including many basic concepts from Aristotelian philosophy incorporated into the biblical God. As an example, they mention that Aristotle stated: "All things are three, and thrice is all: and let us use this number in the worship of the gods; for, as Pythagoreans say, everything and all things are bound by threes, for the end, the middle, and the beginning have this number in everything, and these compose the number of the Trinity." However, Trinitarians have argued that the words attributed to Aristotle differ in a number of ways from what has been published as the philosopher's original text in Greek, which omits "let us use this number in the worship of the gods", and are not supported by translations of the works of Aristotle by scholars such as Stuart Leggatt, W. K. C. Guthrie, J. L. Stocks, Thomas Taylor and Jules Barthélemy-Saint-Hilaire.

Some anti-trinitarians note also that the Greek philosopher Plato believed in a special "threeness" in life and in the universe. In Phaedo, he introduces the word "triad" (in Greek τριάς), which is rendered in English as "trinity". This was adopted by 3rd and 4th century professed Christians as roughly corresponding to "Father, Word, and Spirit (Soul)". Nontrinitarian Christians contend that such notions and adoptions make the Trinity doctrine extra-biblical. They say there is a widely acknowledged synthesis of Christianity with Platonic philosophy evident in trinitarian formulas appearing by the end of the 3rd century. They allege that beginning with the Constantinian period, these pagan ideas were forcibly imposed on the churches as Catholic doctrine. Most groups subscribing to the theory of a Great Apostasy generally concur in this thesis.

The early apologists, including Justin Martyr, Tertullian and Irenaeus, frequently discussed the parallels and contrasts between Christianity, Paganism and other syncretic religions, and answered charges of borrowing from paganism in their apologetical writings.

=== Hellenic influences ===
Stuart G Hall (formerly Professor of Ecclesiastical History at King's College, London) describes the subsequent process of philosophical/theological amalgamation in Doctrine and Practice in the Early Church (1991), where he writes:

The apologists began to claim that Greek culture pointed to and was consummated in the Christian message, just as the Old Testament was. This process was done most thoroughly in the synthesis of Clement of Alexandria. It can be done in several ways. You can rake through Greek literature, and find (especially in the oldest seers and poets) references to 'God' which are more compatible with monotheism than with polytheism (so at length Athenagoras.) You can work out a common chronology between the legends of prehistoric (Homer) Greece and the biblical record (so Theophilus.) You can adapt a piece of pre-Christian Jewish apologetic, which claimed that Plato and other Greek philosophers got their best ideas indirectly from the teachings of Moses in the Bible, which was much earlier. This theory combines the advantage of making out the Greeks to be plagiarists (and therefore second-rate or criminal), while claiming that they support Christianity by their arguments at least some of the time. Especially this applied to the question of God.

The neo-Platonic trinities, such as that of the One, the Nous and the Soul, are not considered a trinity necessarily of consubstantial equals as in mainstream Christianity. However, the neo-Platonic trinity has the doctrine of emanation, or "eternal derivation", a timeless procedure of generation having as a source the One and claimed to be paralleled with the generation of the light from the Sun. This was adopted by Origen and later on by Athanasius, and applied to the generation of the Son from the Father, because they believed that this analogy could be used to support the notion that the Father, as immutable, always had been a Father, and that the generation of the Son is therefore eternal and timeless.

The synthesis of Christianity with Platonic philosophy was further incorporated in the trinitarian formulas that appeared by the end of the 3rd century. "The Greek philosophical theology" was "developed during the Trinitarian controversies over the relationships among the persons of the Godhead". The allegation of borrowing was raised by some disputants when the Nicene doctrine was being formalized and adopted by the bishops. For example, in the 4th century, Marcellus of Ancyra, who taught the Father, Son, and Holy Spirit were one person (hypostasis), said in his On the Holy Church, 9:

Now with the heresy of the Ariomaniacs, which has corrupted the Church of God ... These then teach three hypostases, just as Valentinus the heresiarch first invented in the book entitled by him 'On the Three Natures'. For he was the first to invent three hypostases and three persons of the Father, Son and Holy Spirit, and he is discovered to have filched this from Hermes and Plato."

In his Introduction to the 1964 book Meditations, the Anglican priest Maxwell Staniforth discussed the profound influence of Stoic philosophy on Christianity. In particular:

Again in the doctrine of the Trinity, the ecclesiastical conception of Father, Word, and Spirit finds its germ in the different Stoic names of the Divine Unity. Thus Seneca, writing of the supreme Power which shapes the universe, states, 'This Power we sometimes call the All-ruling God, sometimes the incorporeal Wisdom, sometimes the holy Spirit, sometimes Destiny.' The Church had only to reject the last of these terms to arrive at its own acceptable definition of the Divine Nature; while the further assertion 'these three are One', which the modern mind finds paradoxical, was no more than commonplace to those familiar with Stoic notions.

== Christian groups with nontrinitarian positions ==
=== Early Christian ===
- Arianism
- Esoteric
- Gnosticism
- Subordinationism
- Ebionites
- Nazarene
- Judeo-Christianity

=== Unitarian and Universalism ===
- Biblical unitarianism
- Unitarianism
- Unitarian Universalism

=== Latter Day Saints ===
- Latter Day Saint movement
  - The Church of Jesus Christ of Latter-day Saints (LDS Church)
  - Remnant Church of Jesus Christ of Latter Day Saints
  - Fundamentalist Church of Jesus Christ of Latter-Day Saints

=== Bible Students and splinter groups ===
- Bible Students
- Friends of Man
- Jehovah's Witnesses

=== Sacred Name movement ===
- Assemblies of Yahweh
- Yahweh's Assembly in Messiah

=== Oneness Protestant groups ===
- Elias Hicks (Hicksite Quakers)
- Shakers
- Oneness Pentecostals
- Many members of the Non-subscribing Presbyterian Church of Ireland

=== World Wide Church of God splinter groups ===
- Philadelphia Church of God
- Living Church of God
- United Church of God

While Grace Communion International is the organizational successor to the Worldwide Church of God, the contemporary church now affirms a trinitarian doctrine.

=== New religious movements ===
- Church of Christ, Scientist (Christian Scientists)
- Unity Church
- New Church (Swedenborgian)
- Unification Church (Family Federation for World Peace and Unification)
- Two by Twos (sometimes called The Truth or Cooneyites)

=== Other Nontrinitarians ===
- Christadelphians
- Church of God General Conference
- God Worshipping Society
- La Luz del Mundo
- Monarchianism
- Muggletonianism
- Polish Brethren
- Socinianism
- The Way International

=== Country-specific ===
- Filipino
  - Iglesia ni Cristo (Church of Christ)
  - Members Church of God International
  - Kingdom of Jesus Christ
- Independent Russian
  - Doukhobors
  - Molokan
- Chinese Diaspora
  - Christian Disciples Church

== People ==
- Sabellius, c. 220 (Modalist: the eponymous heresiarch of Sabellianism, or "monarchic modalism"), rejected the idea of co-eternal co-equal distinct persons in the Godhead, but taught that God is a singular Person who manifests himself in multiple and various ways, faces, modes, and operations in history and specific circumstances
- Theodotus of Byzantium
- Artemon
- Paul of Samosata, 269, Bishop of Antioch, believed in monarchianism, the doctrine that says that the Father alone is supreme and that God is not co-equal persons, but one unequal almighty person. Bishop Paul also held to adoptionism which teaches that Jesus was adopted as the Son of God at his baptism, resurrection, or ascension.
- Lucian of Antioch, 312, Christian presbyter, (theologian) and (martyr)
- Arius, 336, presbyter of Alexandria, major theologian of the doctrine of Arianism in 4th century. He opposed the Homoousian declarations of the Alexandrian Bishop Alexander of Alexandria, making him a primary topic of the First Council of Nicea in AD 325.
- Eusebius of Nicomedia, 341, (Arian)
- Eusebius of Caesarea, (Christian historian)
- Constantius II, Byzantine Emperor, 361
- Antipope Felix II, 365
- Aëtius of Antioch, 367
- Ulfilas, Apostle to the Goths, 383
- Priscillian, 385, considered first Christian to be executed for heresy
- Francesco della Sega, (1528–1565)
- Ludwig Haetzer, 1529
- Michael Servetus, 1553, burned at the stake in Geneva under John Calvin
- Sebastian Castellio, 1563
- Ferenc Dávid, 1579
- Justus Velsius, c. 1581
- Fausto Paolo Sozzini, 1604
- John Milton, 1608–1674. (disputed)
- Edward Wightman, 1612, burned at the stake
- Isaac Newton, 1642–1726/27
- John Biddle, 1662
- Thomas Aikenhead, 1697, last person to be hanged for blasphemy in Britain
- John Locke, 1704
- Elias Hicks, 1742, Quaker
- William Whiston, 1752, expelled from University of Cambridge in 1710 for Arianism; famous for translating Josephus
- Jonathan Mayhew, 1766
- Emanuel Swedenborg, 1772, provided the theology for Swedenborgianism
- Joseph Priestley, 1804
- John Adams
- Thomas Jefferson
- John Quincy Adams
- Millard Fillmore
- William Howard Taft
- Joseph Smith, 1805, founder of the Latter-day Saint movement (Mormonism)
- Mary Baker Eddy, 1821, founder of Christian Science
- William Ellery Channing, 1842
- Robert Hibbert, 1849
- Hong Xiuquan, 1864
- John Thomas (Christadelphian), 1871
- Ralph Waldo Emerson, 1882
- Robert Roberts (Christadelphian), 1898
- Benjamin Wilson, 1900
- James Martineau, 1900
- Félix Manalo, 1914
- Charles Taze Russell, 1916, founder of the Bible Student movement and Jehovah's Witnesses, author of Millennial Dawn
- Joseph Franklin Rutherford, 2nd president of the Watchtower Bible and Tract Society
- Alan Hayward (Christadelphian), 1923
- Johannes Greber (Catholic priest)
- Eliseo Soriano, 1947
- William Branham, 1965
- Herbert W. Armstrong, 1986, founder of the Worldwide Church of God, a Sabbatarian Christian Church, and was an advocate of the doctrine of Binitarianism.
- Anthony Buzzard (Biblical Unitarian)

== See also ==
- Bibliotheca antitrinitariorum
- Bahá'í Faith
- Christomonism
- Mandaeism
- Manichaeism
- Servetism
