= Eric Chang =

Eric Chang may refer to:

- Eric Chang (pastor) (1934–2013), Hong Kong pastor
- Eric Chang (politician) (born 1979), Belizean politician born in Taiwan
- Eric Chang (photographer) (born 1990), Indonesian film director and photographer based in the United States

== See also ==
- Eric Chan (born 1959), Hong Kong civil servant
- Eric Cheng (born 1975), American entrepreneur
