= Joseph Marsh (Adventist) =

American preacher (1802–1863)

Joseph Marsh (1802–1863) was an American Millerite Protestant preacher, and editor of The Advent Harbinger, Bible Advocate and The Voice of Truth and Glad Tidings of the Kingdom at Hand".

== Life ==
Joseph Marsh was born in St. Albans, Franklin, Vermont, on December 6, 1802. When he was 16 the family moved to Genesee County, New York, where his parents were disfellowshipped by the Methodist Episcopal Church for rejecting the Trinity. From the ages of 19 to 21 he and his brother Josiah tried their hand at farming, first in Monroe Township, Ashtabula County, Ohio, then in Springfield Township, Erie County, Pennsylvania.

In 1823, he joined his brother James in Rochester, New York. Marsh took up the faith of the Christian Connection he was baptized in the Genesee River "a little above the falls". He then began several years as an itinerant preacher, while working as a carpenter to supplement his income. On August 4, 1830, he married Sarah Mariah Adams (born Sennett, New York, on November 27, 1808). They had three girls; Sarah Eliza (b. 1832), Mary Maria (b. 1834) and Permelia Jane (b. 16 June 1836) From 1839, Marsh was pastor of a Christian Connection church in Union Mills, Fulton County, NY and editor of The Christian Palladium, till in 1843 he took up the teaching of William Miller that Christ would return in 1843.

Following resignation from his pastorship and editorship, he supported Charles Fitch in the call for Millerites to leave established churches. In January 1844 he started publishing The Voice of Truth, and in September 1844 he supported the "seventh month movement". After the Great Disappointment he criticised movements towards the establishment of an Adventist denomination, and advocating "Age to come" doctrine, renamed his magazine The Advent Harbinger and Bible Advocate then in 1850 The Prophetical Expositor.

In 1849, Marsh published The Bible Doctrine or True Gospel Faith, following Millerite views of the millennium, but in 1851 in The Age to Come repudiated some of these and adopted the views of John Thomas in Elpis Israel concerning a national regathering of Israel to Palestine.

Thomas, who had been rebaptised following his break with Campbellites in 1847 urged Marsh to also be rebaptised, as had another associate of Thomas, Benjamin Wilson, in 1851. Thomas and Marsh now agreed in belief in a kingdom on earth and the restoration of Israel, but disagreed on whether this was essential for baptism. Thomas considered that it was, and if it was essential for baptism, therefore it was also essential for fellowship and communion. The tension over rebaptism continued from 1852 to 1860. Marsh and Nathaniel Field of Jeffersonville, Indiana in the Prophetical Expositor, and Thomas in the Herald of the Kingdom conducted an increasingly heated exchange of articles on whether the return of the Jews, and understanding of the promises to Abraham, was a prerequisite for a valid baptism, and therefore communion.

In 1855 and 1856, Field hosted in Jeffersonsville two conferences at which Marsh was a major speaker. They failed however to form a denomination, and Field reduced his involvement.

By 1860, two clearly defined groups existed in Rochester, and several other towns, with those who had been rebaptised since breaking with Millerism and Campbellism, like Thomas, in one group, and those, who did not see the need for a strict doctrinal continuity between belief at the time of baptism and communion, such as Marsh, in the other.

Marsh sold the Prophetical Expositor to Thomas Newman in 1860, and left stocks of his books and hymnbook The Millennial Harp for Newman to sell on his behalf.

Marsh's family was in Rochester for the 1860 census. His daughter Jane Marsh Parker records that "In 1860 Marsh moved to Milby, Canada. In the same year to Oshawa, Canada. He returned to the "Christians" shortly before his death in 1863." Yet Church of God records indicate that in 1863, he had just been appointed state evangelist in Jeffersonville, Indiana, Nathaniel Field's church, when he died at his daughter's home in Tecumseh, Michigan on 13 September 1863, of typhoid fever.

== Beliefs ==
- Marsh probably took opposition to the Trinity and the immortality of the soul from his parents.
- Marsh was initially opposed to having a creed or formal church organisation
- Marsh rejected Seventh-Day doctrine when it came forward in 1850.
- Although Marsh adopted Thomas' view on the Abrahamic promises and Israel, he did not share Thomas' view on the importance of certain doctrinal requirements for baptism and communion.
- It appears that Marsh shared the views of John Thomas and Benjamin Wilson against the supernatural devil.

== Family ==
His daughter Permelia Jane was educated in Rochester, New York, and in 1856 married George T. Parker, a lawyer of that city. She was a frequent contributor to The Churchman and other publications of the Episcopal Church, and was the author of Toiling and Hoping, a novel (New York, 1856); The Boy Missionary (1859); Losing the Way (1860); Under His Banner (1862); The Morgan Boys (1859); Rochester, a Story Historical (Rochester, 1884); The Midnight Cry, a novel founded on the Millerite movement (New York, 1886); Life of S. F. B. Morse (1887); and Papers Relating to the Genesee Country (1888).

== Legacy ==
Having rejoined the Christian Connection Marsh's death had little direct impact on the loose association of churches that subscribed to what was now Newman's magazine. Further Benjamin Wilson had a leading role in the Church of God grouping through his own magazine The Gospel Banner 1855-1869, then Herald of the Coming Kingdom (Despite his agreement with John Thomas on rebaptism, Wilson had himself separated from Thomas in 1863 over the judgement).

The American Civil War provided an impetus to define church boundaries, as in 1865 it was necessary to register for conscientious objection. Many Church of God churches, including those associated with Wilson, took the name Church of God of the Abrahamic Faith. However the Age to Come believers who had been rebaptised, joined with those congregations who had come out of the Campbellite movement with Thomas, and took the name Christadelphians.

The printing press was destroyed in the 1871 Great Chicago Fire.

In 1921 the Church of God of the Abrahamic Faith split with the majority becoming the Church of God General Conference (CoGGC), and the minority, who followed more closely to Wilson's views on fellowship and an allegorical devil, separating to become the Church of the Blessed Hope (CGAF). This smaller group now fellowships with the Christadelphians and not with CoGGC.
