= Chloé Valdary =

American writer and entrepreneur

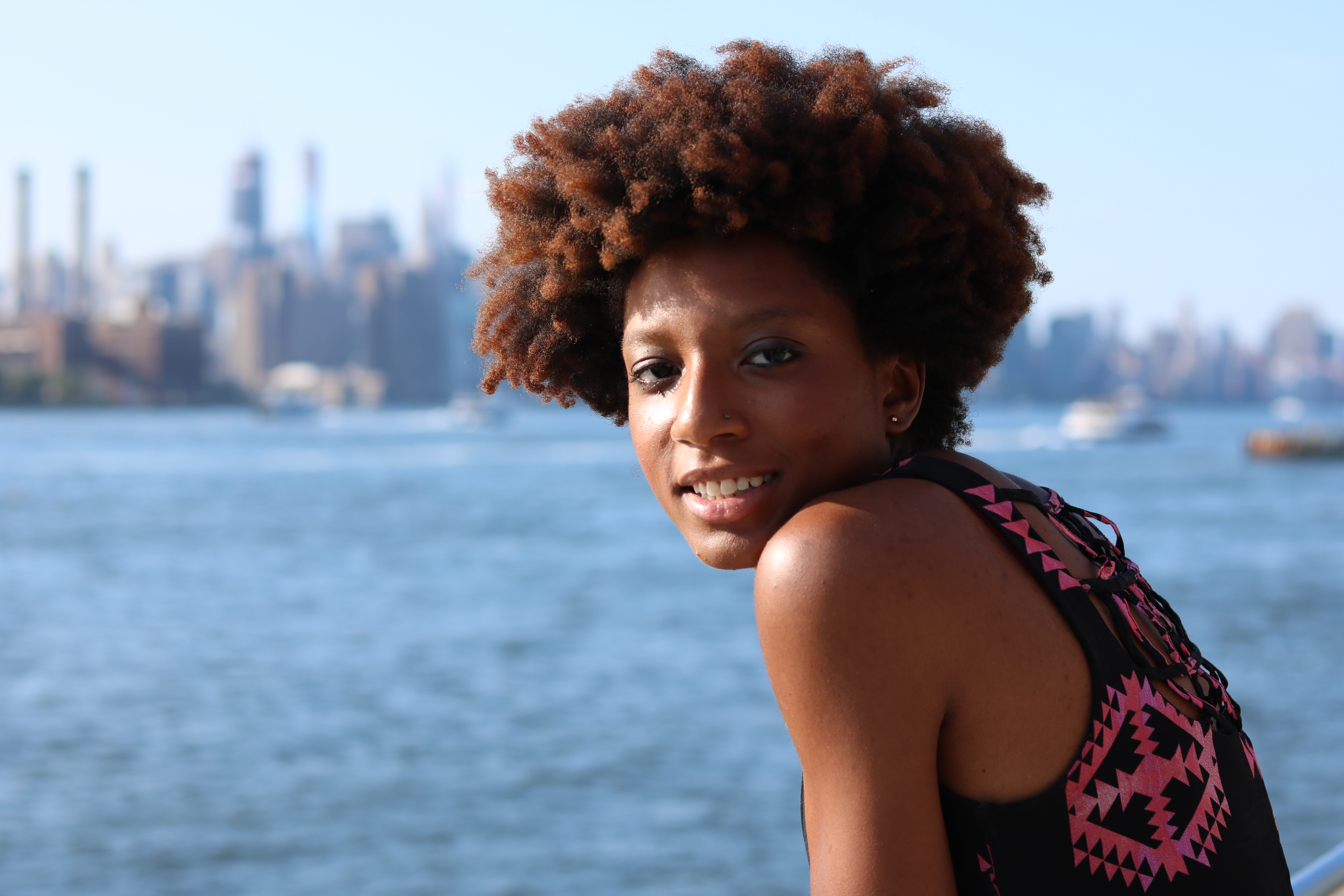
- Born: 1993 (age 32–33)
- Education: University of New Orleans
- Occupations: Writer, entrepreneur, lecturer
- Known for: Social commentary; founding Theory of Enchantment

Chloé Simone Valdary is an American writer and entrepreneur whose company, Theory of Enchantment, teaches social and emotional learning in schools, as well as diversity and inclusion in companies and government agencies.

== Early life and education ==
Valdary grew up in New Orleans, in a family that belonged to the Seventh-Day Sabbatarian Christian Intercontinental Church of God. In 2015, Valdary graduated magna cum laude from the University of New Orleans, earning a BA in international studies.

== Career ==
Valdary founded a pro-Israel student group, Allies of Israel, while a student at the University of New Orleans. Over the years, she has participated in debates where she represented a Zionist perspective.

Before 2015, she served as a Robert L. Bartley Fellow and Tikvah fellow under journalist and political commentator Bret Stephens at The Wall Street Journal. In addition to The Wall Street Journal, Valdary has written articles for The New York Times and The Atlantic magazine.

Valdary has also criticized critical race theory, asserting that it fails to truly capture human complexity and oversimplifies reality.
