= Emphatic Diaglott =

1864 Bible translation by Benjamin Wilson

The Emphatic Diaglott
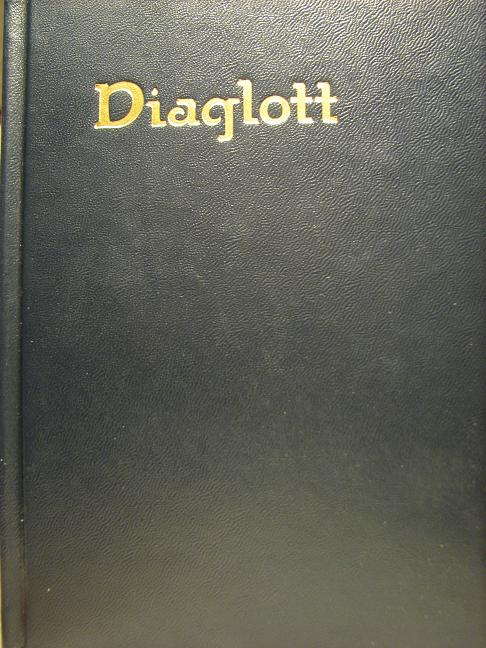
- Full name: The Emphatic Diaglott
- Abbreviation: Diaglott
- NT published: 1864
- Derived from: New Testament
- Translation type: Formal equivalence
- John 3:16 English translation: For God so loved the world, that he gave his son, the only-begotten, that every one believing into him may not perish, but obtain aionian life. Interlinear translation: Thus for loved the God the world, so that the son of himself the only-begotten he gave, that every one who believing into him, not may be destroyed, but may have life age-lasting.

The Emphatic Diaglott is a diaglot, or two-language polyglot translation, of the New Testament by Benjamin Wilson, first published in 1864. It is an interlinear translation with the original Greek text and a word-for-word English translation in the left column, and a full English translation in the right column. It is based on the interlinear translation, the renderings of eminent critics, and various readings of the Codex Vaticanus. It includes illustrative and explanatory footnotes, references, and an alphabetical appendix.

The Greek text is that of Johann Jakob Griesbach. The English text uses "Jehovah" for the divine name a number of times where the New Testament writers used "Ancient Greek: κύριος, romanized: kýrios" (Kyrios, the Lord) when quoting Hebrew scriptures. For example, at Luke 20:42-43 it reads: "For David himself says in the book of Psalms, Jehovah said to my Lord, sit thou at my Right hand, 'till I put thine enemies underneath thy feet", where Jesus quoted Psalm 110:1.

The text of the original edition's title page is as follows:

The Emphatic Diaglott, containing the Original Greek Text of what is Commonly Styled the New Testament (According to the Recension of Dr. J. J. Griesbach), with an Interlineary Word for Word English Translation; A New Emphatic Version, based on the Interlineary Translation, on the Renderings of Eminent Critics, and on the various readings of the Vatican Manuscript, No. 1209 in the Vatican Library: Together with Illustrative and Explanatory Footnotes, and a copious selection of references; to the whole of which is added a valuable Alphabetical Appendix. Fowler and Wells 1865.

== Publishing history ==
A nephew of Benjamin Wilson wrote this account of the production of The Diaglott:

"While I was a boy, my father put me into The Gospel Banner office to learn the printing business. It was during this time, that the EMPHATIC DIAGLOTT was translated and printed. I can now in my mind’s eye see my Uncle Benjamin, sitting at his desk, making a literal word for word translation of the New Testament. I remember seeing the Greek type arrive from England. Many readers of the Diaglott may not be aware that my Uncle not only translated the Diaglott, but took charge of the mechanical work as well. He electro-typed the entire book himself. The following was the process he followed. As each page of the Diaglott was put into type, he took an impression of the page of type in wax. This wax mold was then blackened with very fine blacklead dust. He had a vat containing acid. In this acid he hung a copper plate, and also the wax mold, before he went home at night. In the morning he would find the wax mold would be covered with a thin sheet of copper. This acid dissolved the copper, and the black lead attracted it to the wax mold. He then made metal plates out of melted metal and fastened the copper sheet upon it. He then printed the first edition of the book, from these plates, on a hand press. I used to ink the plate by a soft roller, while he worked the press."

Although Wilson prepared the plates himself, the first edition was published in 1865 by Orson Squire Fowler of Fowler and Wells Ltd. of New York. Fowler and Wells were phrenologists who published a periodical to which Walt Whitman contributed, and also published his Leaves of Grass. (Fowler also had an earlier indirect connection to Wilson's associates among the Christadelphians through having employed Robert Roberts on a trip to Huddersfield in 1861.)

After Wilson's death in 1900, the plates and copyright were inherited by his heirs. Charles Taze Russell, then president of the Watch Tower Bible and Tract Society, approached Wilson's family via a third party and obtained the copyright, and at some later point, the plates. The Society published the Diaglott in 1902, and later had the type reset for publication on its own presses in 1927, with an additional printing in 1942.

In 1952 the copyright to the Diaglott expired and it came into the public domain. The Watch Tower Society sold the Diaglott inexpensively (offering it free of charge from 1990), making it non-viable for others to print until the depletion of that inventory. Others such as Wilson's home church, Church of the Blessed Hope, had considered reprinting their own edition; in 2003 the Miami church of the group, with support from Christadelphians in the United Kingdom and the United States published their own edition, with a new preface.

The public domain status of The Emphatic Diaglott has made it a popular online translation.
