= Nathaniel Field =

Nathaniel Field may refer to:

- Nathaniel Field, printer, often confused with his brother Nathan Field (1587–1620) English dramatist and actor
- Nathaniel Field (Adventist) (1805–1887) Indiana doctor, abolitionist and Adventist preacher
