= Nathaniel Field (Adventist) =

American physician

Nathaniel Field M.D. (1805–1887) was an American abolitionist, and Adventist preacher.

== Life ==
Field was born in Jefferson County, Kentucky, on 7 November 1805. He graduated from Transylvania medical school, Lexington, Kentucky, and practiced medicine in Alabama for three years. In 1829 he removed to Jeffersonville, Indiana, where he stayed for the rest of his life. He was a member of the legislature from 1838 till 1839. In the spring of the latter year he organized the City government of Jeffersonville, under a charter that he drafted and had passed by the legislature.

As a doctor Field was author of a paper on Asiatic Cholera and various other medical articles. His common interests in religion and science led to lectures such as "The Mosaic Record of Creation", "The Age of the Human Race", and "The Chronology of Fossils".

He also published humorous pieces such as "Arts of Imposture and Deception Peculiar to American Society" (1858).

== Abolitionism ==
Field's relatives had held several slaves, which Field immediately emancipated on his inheritance. In 1834 Field voted against the entire town of Jeffersonville opposing a proposition to expel the freed negroes, and had to barricade his house against a mob. Field was related to the abolitionist Stapleton Crutchfield. Field went further than Crutchfield and aided fugitive slaves in the Underground Railroad. He also opposed capital punishment.

He worked for William Lloyd Garrison's abolitionist newspaper The Liberator.

== Religious views ==
On March 7, 1830, he organized the first Campbellite Church of Christ in Jeffersonville, which he served as pastor for 17 years without taking a wage, believing it wrong to "make merchandise of the gospel."

Field was one of many who moved away from the Restoration Movement of Alexander Campbell, and in 1847 he founded the Second Advent Christian Church (SACC) in Jefferson, which he pastored, again without compensation, till his death in 1887.

In common with many of those coming out of the Restoration Movement Field rejected the idea of the immortality of the soul and in 1852, the transcripts of a debate with Elder Thomas P. Connelly on the "State of the Dead" were published in book form. Field also rejected the doctrine of the Trinity, and also the existence of a supernatural devil, seeing this as an allegory, and rejecting traditional ideas about heaven and hell as later traditions not found in the Bible. None of these ideas was particularly radical in the currents of the 1840s. Field held his views in common with many other ex-Campbellites such as John Thomas, Benjamin Wilson and ex-Millerites such as Joseph Marsh.

During the 1840s first Thomas, then Wilson, then Marsh came to adopt the view that the Jews must return to the land in fulfillment of God's promises to Abraham, before Christ could return, following the views of Thomas' book Elpis Israel.

In 1855 and 1856 Field organised two conferences for Marsh, at which other "Age to Come" believers such as A.N. Seymour, P.B. Cook spoke. But Field was despondent at the grouping's inability to form a meaningful denomination.

By 1860 there were clean dividing lines in communion between those such as Thomas and Wilson who had been rebaptised on coming to a clearer understanding and those such as Marsh and Field who had not. This line was made permanent when the American Civil War made the registration of church names essential for the purposes of conscientious objection.

Field's church became the Second Advent Christian Church. Thomas' group became the Christadelphians, and Wilson's group the Church of God of the Abrahamic Faith. Another group with similar heritage, Jonathan Cumming's Advent Christian Church does not seem to have any direct link to Field or his associates. But this was a broad current, and before the Civil War, there were many groups with similar ideas.
