= Armor of God (disambiguation) =

The Armor of God is a biblical metaphor for vigilant righteousness as bestowed by God.

Armor of God may also refer to:

- Armour of God (film), 1987 Hong Kong martial arts action film
  - Armour of God II: Operation Condor, 1991 Hong Kong film
  - Armour of God III: Chinese Zodiac, or Chinese Zodiac, 2012 Hong Kong film
- Armour of God (band), formed by ex-members of Iron Monkey
- Armor of God, a television program produced by the Church of God International
