= Church of God International =

Church of God International may refer to the following:

- Members Church of God International, with its headquarters in Apalit, Pampanga in the Philippines .
- Church of God International (United States), Sabbatarian Christian church headquartered in Tyler, Texas, United States, with congregations in the U.S., Canada, Jamaica, the Philippines, and Australia.
