= 1895 (2008 film) =

2008 film

- Taiwan Poster
- Directed by: Hung Chih-yu
- Written by: Miao-hui Kao; Chiao Li
- Starring: Cheryl Yang; Lee Chia-yin; James Wen
- Music by: Deon Lee; Jeffrey Cheng
- Distributed by: 20th Century Fox Taiwan
- Release date: November 7, 2008
- Running time: 110 minutes
- Country: Taiwan
- Languages: Hakka; Hokkien Taiwanese; Mandarin; Japanese
- Budget: NT$60 million

1895 (Chinese: 1895乙未; Pe̍h-ōe-jī: It-pat-kiú-ngó͘ It-bī); Pha̍k-fa-sṳ: Yit-pat-kíu-ńg Yet-vùi, is a 2008 Taiwanese Hakka film based on the Japanese Invasion of Taiwan in 1895, with emphasis on the Hakka fighters and their families in the conflict. The film has a limited budget of NT$60 million with roughly half of it provided by the Council for Hakka Affairs of the Executive Yuan.

== Plot ==
The Qing Dynasty was defeated by Japan in the Sino-Japanese War of 1895 and 1895, and signed the Treaty of Shimonoseki in 1895 to cede Taiwan to Japan. On May 29, the Japanese army landed in Aotai. The great Japanese writer Ogai came to Taiwan with Prince Nohisa of Kitashirakawa Palace as a military doctor and quickly went south. Tang Jingsong, the president of the Democratic Republic of Taiwan, abandoned his post and fled. The new commander Tang Xing gathered Hakka commoners Jiang Shaozu and Xu Xiang to form a new Miao army to fight against the Japanese army.

Women have no say and can only silently support the men on the battlefield, till the fields and raise chickens, and be their backing. In the Battle of Bagua Mountain, the Taiwanese rebel army was almost wiped out, and Prince Nengjiu also died of illness in Tainan. After the war, Mori Ogai lamented: "Victory is not an honor, and victory should be like a funeral."

Scholar Wu Tangxing ignored the rumors and married Huang Xianmei, who had been kidnapped by bandits but returned safely. Wu Tangxing joined the army and formed the Hakka Volunteer Army to fight against Japan. At first, they won many battles, but they failed in Hsinchu and fell into a bitter battle in Miaoli. Due to the huge disparity in military strength and insufficient weapons, food and pay, Wu Tangxing could only use guerrilla tactics to delay the Japanese army's march south.

In midsummer, Huang Xianmei was bleaching cloth by the Miaoli River. She met Japanese military doctor Mori Ogai and discovered that the Japanese army was approaching her home. Wu Tangxing eventually died unfortunately, and the grieving Huang Xianmei committed suicide by throwing herself into a well.

== Reception ==
The film won the Best Drama Series award in the Asian Television Awards in 2009. A review published in the Taipei Times stated that the film was "educational at best" and geared toward students and teachers of history.
