= Deon Lee =

South Korean born composer (born 1982)

- Born: June 7, 1982 (age 42); Seoul, South Korea
- Occupation: Film Score Composer
- Years active: 2008-present

Deon Lee (Hangul: 디온 리) is a South Korean born composer known for his works on films 1895 and Papa.

Upon graduating from Berklee College of Music with a scholarship, he has worked with Velton Ray Bunch as an assistant composer for the television movie The Tenth Circle which premiered on Lifetime channel. In 2008, Lee was asked to score for the Taiwanese film Blue Brave: The Legend of Formosa in 1895 (a.k.a. 一八九五) which was released and distributed by 20th Century Fox Taiwan and has aired on Hakka TV stations. The movie won the Best Drama Series Award at the 14th Asian Television Awards and was chosen the best 10 films of the Chinese Film Critic Association that year.

== Filmography ==
=== Films ===
Year	Title	Director(s)	Notes
2008	Blue Brave: The Legend of Formosa in 1895	Zhiyu Hong	Composer, with Jeffrey Cheng
2016	PAPA	Xiao Zheng	Composer

== Awards and nominations ==
Lee was the recipient of the Best Soundtrack Award and appeared as a special guest with Stephen McEveety at the 4th Pan Pacific Film Festival in 2011. His music was nominated at the 1st International Fashion Film Awards in La Jolla, California, where his original score to the dance film Lilith by Eric Chang won the Best Creative Concept Award at the La Jolla Fashion Film Festival. In 2014, Badbug, a South Korean drama thriller short film he had scored won the Best Comics-Oriented Award at the Comic-Con International Independent Film Festival.
