= Jane Marsh Parker =

American writer

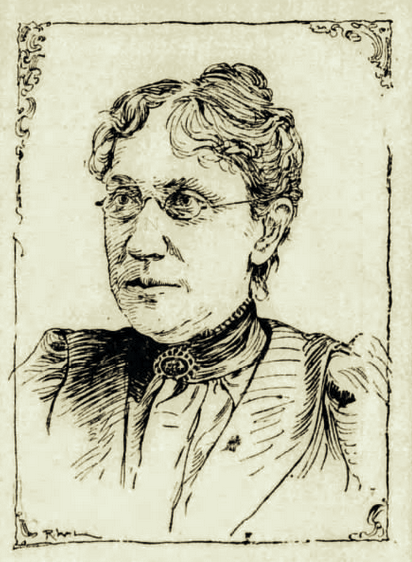
- Born: Permelia Jane Marsh; June 16, 1836; Milan, New York, US
- Died: March 13, 1913 (aged 76); Los Angeles, California, US
- Resting place: Mount Hope Cemetery, Rochester, New York
- Occupations: author; historian; clubwoman
- Spouse: George T. Parker (m. 1856; died 1895)
- Parent: Joseph Marsh
- Relatives: John Quincy Adams
- Writing career
- Pen name: Jenny Marsh Parker
- Language: English

Jane Marsh Parker (née, Marsh; pen name, Jenny Marsh Parker; June 16, 1836 – March 13, 1913) was an American author and historian of the long nineteenth century. She was a frequent contributor to The Churchman and other publications of the Protestant Episcopal church. She was the author of novels and religious works, including Toiling and Hoping (New York, 1856); The Boy Missionary (1859); Losing the Way (1860); Under His Banner (1862); The Morgan Boys (1859); Rochester, a Story Historical (Rochester, 1884); The Midnight Cry (New York, 1886); Life of S. F. B. Morse (1887); and Papers Relating to the Genesee Country (1888), among other publications. A pioneer clubwoman, Parker founded the Fortnightly Ignorance Club of Rochester, New York, which was the first women's club in the state after Sorosis.

== Early life and education ==
Permelia Jane Marsh was born in Milan, New York, on June 16, 1836. The father, Rev. Joseph Marsh, was a Campbellite minister, who adopted the views of William Miller and was a leader in the Second Advent movement in 1843-50. The mother, Sarah Adams Marsh, was a descendent from John Quincy Adams. Parker had two sisters, Sarah Eliza Marsh (1832-1900) and Mary Maria Marsh (1834-1900).

She was educated in Rochester.

== Career ==
On August 26, 1856, she married George Tan Parker, an attorney (and later a judge) of Rochester. Their children were, Richard Marsh Parker (1859-1934), George Force Parker (1866-1946), Henry Nelly Parker (1869-1970), and Margaret Marsh Parker (1871-1951).

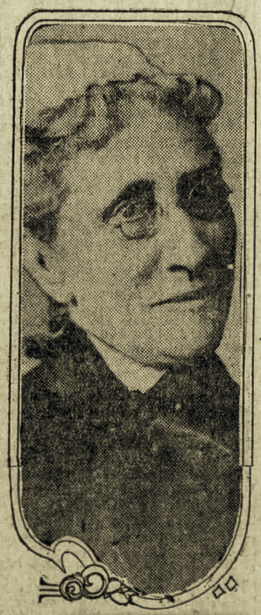
(undated)

As a writer, Parker was well-known throughout the country, sometimes using the pen name, "Jenny Marsh Parker". She contributed to all the leading periodicals, including that of the Episcopal Church, as well as Harper's Magazine and The Century Magazines. She was one of the Spectator's Club contributors to The Outlook, and a member of the Contributors' Club, writing for the Atlantic Monthly.

She wrote a number of children's stories as well as more important works. Parker's historical writings include histories of Rochester, the Genesee Valley, the Iroquois, and the Jesuits. Treating the Millerite delusions, which prevailed during her childhood, was a special literary field. She wrote the "Little Millerite", published in The Century Magazine in 1886. Shortly before that, she had published her novel, The Midnight Cry, a tale in which she gives a vivid account of the Millerite delusion, writing from personal knowledge, having been brought up in that faith.

Parker was one of the founders of the Rochester Historical Society and was its first corresponding secretary. She was a member of Daughters of the American Revolution, Irondequoit Chapter, Rochester. She also had the distinction of founding the first women's club in New York state after Sorosis, the Fortnightly Ignorance Club of Rochester. Instead of starting out with the assumption that the members have an abundance of knowledge upon every subject, the principal plank in its platform is, "We know nothing but seek knowledge". It started with half a dozen members meeting in Judge Parker's office. It soon grew to several hundred members with the chamber of commerce for its headquarters. At meetings, a paper was read, questions followed, and the subject chosen for the next meeting, one of which the members knew little but wished to know much.

Parker was one of the first women to oppose the placing of children in jails with hardened criminals, and it was largely through her efforts that the first matron was placed in the Rochester jail. She opposed women's suffrage. "If I should ever vote, it would be to cast a ballot against woman's suffrage."

== Personal life ==
Parker was the friend of many noted persons. She corresponded with Hall Caine, George William Curtis, Henry James, Eugene Field, Justin Winsor, Francis Parker, and Susan B. Anthony. Mark Twain wrote:— "I greet you with pleasure; you were a good audience all by yourself."

In 1911, Parker moved from New York to Escondido, California. She died of bronchial pneumonia in Los Angeles, California on March 13, 1913, at the home of her daughter, Margaret. Interment was at Mount Hope Cemetery, Rochester.

== Selected works ==
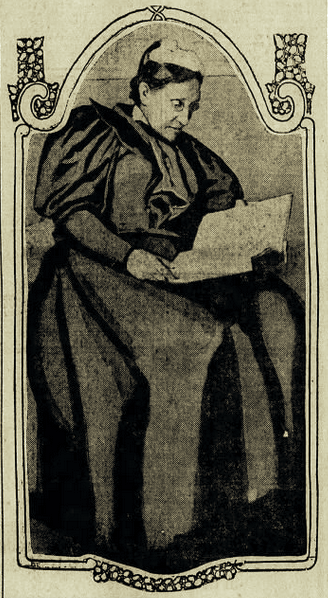
(undated)

- Toiling and Hoping, 1856
- The Boy Missionary, 1858
- The Light of the World, Or, Footprints of Christ Our Lord, 1858
- Frank Earnest, Or Going Into the Master's Vineyard ..., 1858
- Seed for the Spring-time: Or, Common Names and Common Things, in the Church and Liturgy, Explained for Little Learners, 1858
- What a Little Child Should Know: Or, Simple Lessons on the Creed, Lord's Prayer, Ten Commandments, Etc, 1858
- Around the Manger; Or, Christmas, Past and Present,: With St. Chrysostom's Sermon, 1858
- Losing the Way, 1859
- The Morgan Boys, 1859
- L'Enfant missionnaire, histoire pour la jeunesse, par Mme J.M. Parker, traduction libre par Henry T. de Jersey, 1860
- Barley Wood: Or, Building on the Rock, 1860
- The Soldier of the Cross, Or, Life of St. Paul: Written for the Lambs of the Flock, 1861
- Around the Manger: Or, Christmas, Past and Present, 1861
- Under His Banner, 1862
- The Story of a Story-book, 1863
- Dick Wortley, Or, Choosing a Profession, 1863
- Under His Banner, 1869
- The Duty of the American White Woman to the American Black Woman, 1884
- Rochester: A Story Historical, 1884
- The Midnight Cry: A Novel, 1886
- Life of S. F. B. Morse, 1887
- Papers Relating to the Genesee Country, 1888
- An Evening with David Copperfield: A Literary and Musical Dickens Entertainment Comprising Readings, Impersonations, Tableaux, Pantomimes and Music, 1889
- The Opening of the Genesee Country, 1892
- The Jesuit Relations, 1894
- Christ Church, Rochester, Western New York: A Story, ..., 1905
