= Intercontinental Church of God =

Christian denomination

- Classification: Christian
- Region: International
- Founder: Garner Ted Armstrong
- Origin: 1998; Tyler, Texas
- Separated from: Church of God International

The Intercontinental Church of God (ICG) is a nontrinitarian Christian denomination currently headquartered in Tyler, Texas, United States, which was founded by Garner Ted Armstrong (1930–2003) in 1998.

ICG produces a television program and has congregations in the United States, Canada and Australia.

== Beliefs ==
The Intercontinental Church of God is a splinter group of the U.S. based Church of God International. As such it holds to most of the distinctive beliefs taught by the Church of God International (United States) such as the continuing validity of the Law of Moses (e.g., observing Saturday as the seventh day sabbath and observing the biblical holy days) by Christians, and the falsity of the Trinity, personality of the Holy Spirit, and immortality of the soul. A veracity interpretation of biblical prophecy is strongly emphasized, particularly through their sister ministry, the Garner Ted Armstrong Evangelistic Association.

== See also ==
- Herbert W. Armstrong
- Church of God, International
- The World Tomorrow (radio and television)

== Bibliography ==
- "Garner Ted Armstrong and CGI Parting", The Journal – News of the Churches of God, Issue No. 12 (January 30, 1998)
- "Garner Ted Armstrong", National Obituary Archive
- "1998", The Journal – News of the Churches of God, Timeline 1998
- "Church of God Timeline: 1996 to 2004". The Journal, news of the churches of God. Archived from the original on September 2, 2012.
- Eugene V. Gallagher; W. Michael Ashcraft (October 2006). Introduction to New and Alternative Religions in America: African diaspora traditions and other American innovations. Greenwood Publishing Group. p. 189. ISBN 978-0-275-98717-6. "The Intercontinental Church of God ... comes under the umbrella of his Garner Ted Armstrong Evangelistic Association. After his death in 2003, his son, Mark Armstrong, assumed control of The Intercontinental Church Of God and its affiliated organizations."
