= Eureka: An Exposition of the Apocalypse =

Eureka: An Exposition of the Apocalypse (commonly called Eureka) is a book written by John Thomas in 1861. Each chapter has been written expounding the corresponding chapter of the last book of the bible (Revelation, or Apocalypse in the Greek). Originally written in a three volume set, later editors published the work in 5 volumes. In earlier editions, Eureka included the Exposition of Daniel, which was later generally published as a separate work.

Most people claim that The Apocalypse is too deep and enigmatical to be understood. But its style constitutes a challenge to faith. In delivering it to John for the benefit of "his servants", the Lord treated them as "his friends".

He declared: "Henceforth I call you not servants; for the servant knoweth not what his lord doeth; but I have called you friends; for all things that I have heard of my Father I have made known unto you" (John 15:15). The Apocalypse needs to be treated in that fashion. If we value the friendship of Christ we will not be deterred by its problems, but will prayerfully and conscientiously seek to understand it.

"Blessed is he that readeth," declared Christ. Christ does not mock us by inviting us to engage in a vain study. The Apocalypse is not sealed: "Seal not the sayings of the prophecy of this book" (Rev. 22:10). That this book is understandable, the volumes of Eureka are a witness. With them before him, let no reader foster the idea that The Apocalypse is a book beyond comprehension. Under God, through the labours of its author, the basic principles of the Truth have been clearly set forth: and similarly, in Eureka, the deeper revelation of the divine purpose has been expounded. And in a manner that the simplest mind can grasp with a prayerful effort.

Let the reader gratefully accept the providential help of Eureka. By its means, he can read himself rich unto life eternal.

— Foreword, Eureka Volume 1
