= Francesco della Sega =

Italian Protestant martyr (1528–1565)

Francesco della Sega (1528 – 26 February 1565) was an Italian antitrinitarian executed by the Venetian Inquisition. He was born in Rovigo.

== Works ==
- Letters
