= Church of God General Conference =

Nontrinitarian Adventist Christian body

The Church of God General Conference (CoGGC) is a nontrinitarian, Adventist Christian body also known as the Church of God of the Abrahamic Faith. It was founded in 1921 and is active throughout the United States and globally. Total affiliated churches in North America number more than seventy, a majority of which have local congregational names.

The Church of the Blessed Hope, some of whose congregations also use the name Church of God of the Abrahamic Faith (CGAF), are a separate denomination, although they share the same origins.

== History ==
The Church of God General Conference has roots in several similar groups that eventually united in 1921 in Waterloo, Iowa, to form the current national organization. These small groups had reached similar doctrinal convictions through independent Bible study. In the mid-19th century, some of the individuals and groups, including Joseph Marsh of New York, Nathaniel Field of Indiana, and the Wilson family of Illinois (Benjamin Wilson's family), began to circulate religious writings which made the groups aware of one another. This led to fellowship, the development of state conferences, and an attempted national organization in 1888.

Strong convictions on the autonomy and authority of individual congregations led to the demise of the original attempt. In 1921 the groups divided, with the larger becoming the Church of God General Conference, and the smaller the Church of the Blessed Hope. The Church of the Blessed Hope held to the beliefs shared by Benjamin Wilson, and the Church of God General Conference expanded their belief system to embrace doctrines (e.g. the existence of a personal Devil) previously not held by the group Wilson helped co-found.

== Doctrines ==
Doctrines of the Church of God General Conference include belief in the authority of the Christian Bible as the rule of faith; one God, who is the Father; Jesus as God's Son, who came into existence beginning with his miraculous conception; repentance is lifelong change, the literal premillennial second coming of Jesus; those who have accepted the gospel will be resurrected at the return of Jesus, and promises of God to Abraham will be literally fulfilled, referred to as the "Kingdom of God" being established on Earth.

=== Statement of Faith ===
The Church of God General Conference statement of faith states, and Atlanta Bible College advocates:

- the oneness of God (1 Cor. 8:6)
- that the Holy Spirit is God's power (Acts 1:8)
- that Jesus is God's only begotten Son (Matt. 16:16), and is humankind's mediator to God (1 Tim. 2:5)
- the Christian Bible is the inspired Word of God (2 Timothy 3:16)
- the mortality of man (Job 4:17; Psa. 146:4)
- the near return of Jesus (Acts 1:11), and life only through him (Col. 3:3)
- the literal resurrection of the dead (John 5:28, 29)
- the immortalization of those who believe in Jesus as their savior (1 Cor. 15:53, 54)
- the destruction of the wicked (Rev. 21:8)
- the final restoration of Israel as the Kingdom of God under the kingship of Jesus (Luke 1:32)
- the church to be joint heirs with Jesus (Rom. 8:17), and Israel to be made head over gentile nations (Isa. 60:13)
- the "restitution of all things which God hath spoken by the mouth of His holy prophets since the world began" (Acts 3:21)
- repentance and immersion in the name of Jesus for the remission of sins (Acts 2:38)
- that a consecrated life is essential to salvation (Heb. 12:14)

=== Other doctrines ===
A significant distinctive doctrine of the Church of God General Conference is denial of the personal pre-existence of Christ, but acceptance of the virgin birth—a position in Christology historically known as Socinianism, although adherents of this view today often prefer the term "Biblical Unitarianism". The main distinguishing doctrinal difference between the Church of God General Conference (CoGGC) and Christadelphians and Church of the Blessed Hope (CGAF) is that the majority of CoGGC members believe that Satan is a literal fallen angel, although a minority do not. Anthony Buzzard of Atlanta Bible College has debated Christadelphians and written defending the traditional view of the devil. However, there is no mention of the devil in the CoGGC Statement of Faith, and this doctrine is not considered a fundamental.

== Organization ==
The Churches of God are congregational in government, yet cooperate in publications and missions ministries, and the Atlanta Bible College. International headquarters are located in McDonough in Henry County, Georgia in the metro-Atlanta area. The Restitution Herald is the official periodical of the church, and is published bi-monthly. A journal dealing with the doctrines of the movement, A Journal From the Radical Reformation, has been published quarterly since 1991. The Yearbook of American and Canadian Churches states the Church of God General Conference had 89 churches and 5,018 members in 2002. The 2010 US Religion Census listed the CoGGC as having 3,842 members in 84 churches. Korean Extension: The Korean Extension is a Korean ministry of the Atlanta Bible College. The Korean Extension was officially started in the fall semester of the 2003 school year by Pastor Steve An. The Korean Extension is led by Pastors Steve An & Sam An, and the campus is located in Duluth, Georgia. As of the year 2010 there are approximately 100 students in the Atlanta Bible College Korean Extension.

== See also ==
- Benjamin Wilson
- Church of the Blessed Hope
