= Eric Chang (photographer) =

American photographer and film director

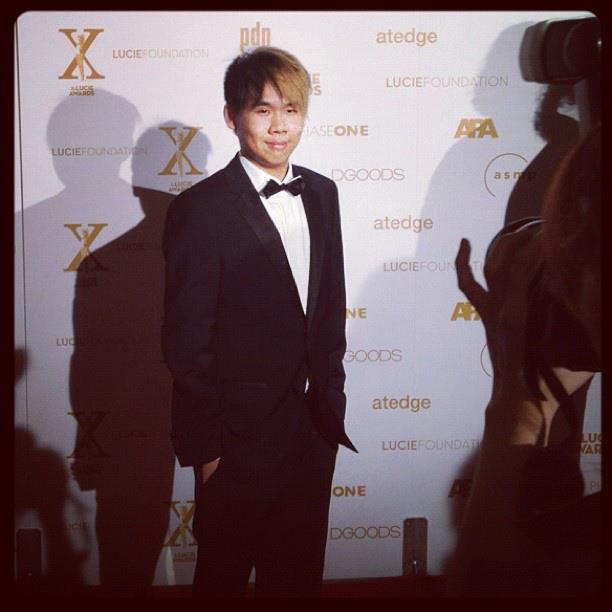
- Chang at the Red Carpet of the Annual Lucie Awards
- Born: February 1990 (age 36)
- Education: B.A. in Film Directing and Cinematography, Art Center College of Design
- Known for: Film, photography
- Awards: 2017; The Monk By The Sea, International Fashion Film Awards; 2013; Best Creative Concept, International Fashion Film Awards; 2012; Discovery of the Year Award Nominee, Lucie Awards; 2012; IPA International Photography Awards, Gold Prize; 2011, 2010; Px3 Prix de la Photographie Paris; 2010; Hasselblad Masters
- Website: chang.pictures

Eric Chang (born 1990) is a film director and photographer, based in Los Angeles and New York.

== Biography ==
Eric Chang was born in East Java in February 1990. His father is a sculptor, and his mother, a ceramic designer and entrepreneur.

== Photography career ==
At 15 years old, he became the official photographer for Addie MS’ Twilite Orchestra and quickly became a photographer working with Krisdayanti, Luna Maya, and Sebastian Gunawan. When he was 18 years old, he had his first solo exhibition, "Primero", at the Intercontinental Hotel L’espace Gallery. Soon after, Chang began at the Art Center College of Design in Pasadena, California. He initially studied photography and imaging before moving to the film department to study under Ross LaManna.

In 2012, Chang was nominated for the Discovery of the Year at the 10th Annual Lucie Awards, held at the Beverly Hilton. His winning photographs were acquired by Elton John and David Furnish.

In the beginning of 2014, Chang transitioned from commercial photography to personal and commissioned projects. Since 2016, his photography has exhibited at the Georges Bergès Gallery in SoHo, New York City.

== Film career ==
He worked on a short narrative film, Aexis, in mid-2011 with cinematographer H.R. McDonald. The film and McDonald won the 2012 Andrew Laszlo Student Heritage Award, undergraduate category, awarded by the American Society of Cinematographers.

In 2012, Chang directed the 8-minute experimental dance and fashion film, Lilith, starring choreographer and dancer Nathania Alvita, Deon Lee, Gareth Pugh, and Rick Owens. The film was screened at the Portland Art Museum and nominated for their Academy Awards Short Films region 1 finals. It was also nominated for 5 awards (including Best Picture and Best Director), winning Best Creative Concept, at the International Fashion Film Awards in 2013.

Since then, Chang has continued to direct fashion films. In late 2013, he directed a fashion film starring Alektra Blue entitled, Blumenblatt. It was released in 2015 at the Miami Short Film Festival. In 2016 he partnered with producer Josh Chunn, Chris Cortazzo, and Martyn Lawrence Bullard to create a series of films that promoted real estate listings. One of them, The Monk by the Sea, which was inspired by Caspar David Friedrich's painting and shot at a property on Cliffside Drive, premiered at the 2017 La Jolla International Fashion Film Festival. It won an award at the festival, along with 3 other nominations for Best Director, Cinematography and Music.
