= Benjamin Wilson (biblical scholar) =

Autodidact biblical scholar, writer, and co-founder

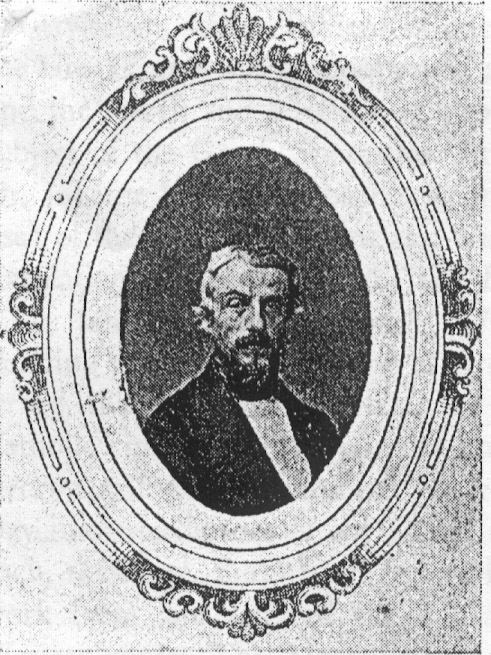
Benjamin Wilson

Benjamin Wilson (1817–1900) was an autodidact Biblical scholar and writer of the Emphatic Diaglott translation of the Bible (which he translated between 1856 and 1864). He was also a co-founder of the Church of God of the Abrahamic Faith.

== Life ==
Wilson was born in Halifax, England, probably in 1817, but spent the majority of his life in the United States (to which he moved, initially to Geneva, Illinois, with his family, in 1844), where he died on May 8, 1900, in Sacramento, California.

Although originally Baptists, Wilson's family joined the growing Campbellite movement in 1840, but began to distance themselves from the Campbellites while in Geneva. In 1846 Wilson wrote his first letter to another ex-Campbellite John Thomas, as recorded in the latter's magazine The Herald of the Future Age, agreeing with the Thomas' views on the immortal soul – the initial cause of his break with Campbell. There is considerable correspondence in Thomas' magazines from various members of the Wilson family over the next several years.

Benjamin Wilson was rebaptised in 1851, marking off a new start from the Campbellites, just as John Thomas had been in 1847. In August 1856, Benjamin Wilson and John Thomas finally met, as recorded in The Herald of the Kingdom for that year. Wilson recognized Thomas from his picture in Elpis Israel.

Wilson published a monthly religious magazine, the Gospel Banner, which ran from 1855 to 1869, when it was merged with his nephew Thomas Wilson's magazine, Herald of the Coming Kingdom. He also published a hymnbook, the Sacred Melodist, in 1860.

Good relations between Wilson and Thomas lasted until 1863 or 1864 when the two brethren fell out over how to reconcile 1 Corinthians 15:52 "raised incorruptible" with Romans 14:10 & 2 Corinthians 5:10. Wilson, stressing 1Co.15:52, took the view that the righteous dead would not be judged before the bema, Thomas, stressing Ro.14:10 and 2Co.5:10, took the view that there was a physical change involved between being raised mortal and then, following judgement, transformed and clothed with immortality. Thomas' 1st Edition of Elpis Israel 1848 had been, at best, ambiguous on the subject, so several passages in the 4th Edition of 1866 were changed to reflect the 'increased clarity' in his position. John Thomas never directly acknowledged that he, and not Wilson, was the one who had changed his view, nevertheless Robert Roberts did so in 1896, as did Charles Curwen Walker in 1906.

As a result of what later came to be known as the "immortal emergence" controversy, fellowship between the two men, and their groups, was severed. Then in 1865 when both groups registered with the Union Government as conscientious objectors using different denominational names the breach was made permanent. In 1865 the group of Christians Benjamin Wilson was then associated with had become known by the name Church of God of the Abrahamic Faith. Although some local groups were not able to register by this name and registered as Church of the Blessed Hope. Some other groups in Illinois who had previously associated with Wilson took the side of John Thomas, and registered with the Union Government as Christadelphians.

== Legacy ==
Wilson's main legacy consists in two areas:

The original 1865 Fowler and Wells edition of the Emphatic Diaglott was one of the earliest interlinear Greek-English New Testaments published in America and thus had considerable influence. After Wilson's death In 1902 the copyright and plates of the Diaglott were bought from the Fowler & Wells Company of New York city and were presented as a gift to the Watch Tower Bible & Tract Society, then known as the International Bible Students Association (IBSA) (later the Watch Tower Bible and Tract Society of Pennsylvania) which from 1902 distributed Wilson's work widely around the world. For this reason Wilson's name is often incorrectly associated with Jehovah's Witnesses (then known as simply as "Bible Students"), though Wilson never had any association with the founder of the Bible Students group Charles Taze Russell. Further, Wilson's own views on the allegorical nature of the devil, non-preexistence of Christ, literal return of Christ – increasing in conflict with the Watchtower Society after 1914 – are occasionally reflected in the side column of the Diaglot, giving Wilson's own English translation.

The church Wilson was a leading figure in founding still exists today. In 1921 the Church of God of the Abrahamic Faith split into two, primarily over the issue of whether the devil was to be understood as literal or figurative, both taking the name Church of God of the Abrahamic Faith, resulting in some confusion today:

- The smaller group, which retained the view of Wilson on the devil as allegory, is now sometimes also known as the Church of the Blessed Hope. This group is in unity talks with Christadelphians.
- The larger group, which today predominantly believe in a supernatural devil, are also known as the Church of God General Conference. Their publications commonly cite Joseph Marsh (1802–1863) rather than Wilson as their spiritual forebear, though Marsh's role in the formation of the group is not clearly documented.

== See also ==
- Emphatic Diaglott
- Church of the Blessed Hope
- Church of God General Conference (Abrahamic Faith)

== Other sources ==
- Hemingray, Peter (2003). John Thomas: His Friends and His Faith. Canton, MI: Christadelphian Tidings. ISBN 81-7887-012-6.
- "English Bible Translations – The Emphatic Diaglott". Tyndale House. Archived from the original on January 6, 2007.
- Benjamin Wilson (1870). The Emphatic Diaglott: Containing the Original Greek Text of what is Commonly Styled the New Testament (according to the Recension of J. J. Griesbach) with an Interlineary Word for Word English Translation; a New Emphatic Version, Based on the Interlineary Translation, on the Renderings of Eminent Critics, and on the Various Readings of the Vatican Manuscript No. 1209 in the Vatican Library; Together with Illustrative and Explanatory Foot Notes, and a Copious Selection of References; to the Whole of which is Added a Valuable Alphabetical Appendix. Fowler & Wells.
