= Eric Chang (pastor) =

Chinese-born Christian religious leader

Eric H.H. Chang (张熙和, born 1934 Shanghai, died 2013 Montreal) was a pastor, a Christian writer, and the leader of a movement called Christian Disciples Church.

== Biography ==
Chang was born in Shanghai, and spent his childhood in war-torn China, but also for a time in Switzerland. As a young adult, he was hostile to Christianity, but became a Christian after a series of encounters with God.

In the 1950s, Chang moved to England where he received his biblical and theological training. He graduated from the Bible Training Institute (Glasgow) and London Bible College (now London School of Theology), and then read Arts and Divinity at the University of London (King’s College and SOAS).

== Church Ministry in England and Canada ==
England was the place of Chang’s formative years of church ministry, first at a church in London, then at a church in Liverpool. He was ordained by the Reverend Andrew MacBeath, principal of the Bible Training Institute.

In 1976, Chang was invited to lead a church in Montreal, Canada. Initially there was no church called Christian Disciples Church, but over the years, CDC emerged from its early roots and took on a more international presence, notably in Asia. He served as CDC’s main pastor for three decades, residing mainly in Montreal and Hong Kong. A prominent feature of his ministry is the New Testament pattern of discipleship. This has spawned several church-based trainings which have been the main impetus of a church movement.

== Reassessment of Trinitarianism in his later years ==
First as a divinity student and later as a pastor, Chang had been a staunch trinitarian for several decades, having done much to promote trinitarianism in his teaching and preaching. But around 2005, through a restudy of the Bible, he began to question his own trinitarian perspective on things such as the deity of Christ, concluding that it is not supported by the biblical data.

In 2009, he wrote The Only True God: A Study of Biblical Monotheism, to present the biblical evidence against his former trinitarian Christology. This was followed by The Only Perfect Man, which focuses the discussion on Jesus Christ.

His writings on biblical monotheism have received the attention of a few Christian writers in the western world such as Sir Anthony F. Buzzard, J. Dan Gill, and Greg S. Deuble, but also among some movements in Asia.

His writings are discussed positively in a theological compilation, One God, the Father, by Thomas E. Gaston of Oxford University, in a chapter, Biblical Monotheism Today, by Rob J. Hyndman of Monash University, Melbourne.

== Books ==
Chang, Eric H.H.(2009, 2017). The Only True God: A Study of Biblical Monotheism. ISBN 9781532898204.

——— (2013). The Only Perfect Man: The Glory of God in the Face of Jesus Christ. ISBN 9781532898273.

——— (2000, 2007, 2017). How I Have Come to Know the Living God: Testifying to God’s Reality and Goodness. ISBN 9781534995772.

——— (2001, 2015). Totally Committed! The Importance of Commitment in Biblical Teaching. ISBN 9781515071686.

——— (2004). Becoming a New Person: What the Bible Teaches About Regeneration, Renewal, and Christ-likeness. 978-1532898150
