= Church of God International (United States) =

Nontrinitarian Christian denomination

- Classification: Church of God
- Leader: Board of Directors
- Region: International
- Headquarters: Tyler, Texas
- Founder: Garner Ted Armstrong, et al.
- Origin: 1978; Tyler, Texas
- Separated from: Worldwide Church of God
- Separations: Intercontinental Church of God; Christian Educational Ministries (Ronald L. Dart); Churches of God Outreach Ministries(CGOM)
- Congregations: 61

The Church of God, International (CGI) is a Binitarian Christian denomination based in the United States, an offshoot of the Worldwide Church of God (WCG) founded by Herbert W. Armstrong. It is one of many Sabbatarian Churches of God to separate from WCG.

== Foundation ==
CGI was founded in 1978 by four former members of the Worldwide Church of God, including evangelist Garner Ted Armstrong (1930–2003) after his father, Herbert W. Armstrong, excommunicated him from the WCG and fired him from all roles in the church over disagreements about operations and certain doctrinal positions. CGI established its headquarters in Tyler, Texas, and also founded the Garner Ted Armstrong Evangelistic Association.

The church logo features a breastplate, helmet, crossed swords, and a banner inscribed with Ephesians 6:11-17. It is based on a wall hanging Garner Ted assembled from a suit of armor presented to him as a gift from his father.

== Governance ==
"We are discovering that primus inter pares (first among equals) is a biblical principle rooted in humility."

— Former Ministerial Board Chairman Charles Groce

CGI was led by Armstrong until 1998. Armstrong and the ministerial leadership aimed to develop a "servant-leadership type of ministry" in contrast to the "one man, top down leadership", of the WCG—this was an important point of departure for the founders after what was perceived to be years of ministerial abuse of power within the WCG, even though Ted himself continued to be very authoritarian.

In 1995, amid accusations of sexual assault involving an incident at a massage parlor, Armstrong was asked to resign. No charges were ever filed. Armstrong left CGI and founded the Intercontinental Church of God. Citing health reasons, prominent church leader Ronald L. Dart had previously left CGI to found his own religious service organization, Christian Educational Ministries, in 1995. After significant ministerial reorganization, the church made an effort to put the incident behind them and focus on continuing "the work". Currently, there is a sharing of administration and leadership among church pastors through a board of directors. The chairman's position is subject to re-election every three years. Charles Groce was chief executive officer for the church until June 2015, when he announced his retirement. Vance Stinson was elected to replace him as CEO.

The Ministerial Council has also developed a mentoring program called MAP (Ministerial Apprentice Program) for training new church leaders, replacing Imperial Academy, which had been established in the fall of 1994.

CGI has actively sought to maintain a positive relationship with many of the offshoots of the Worldwide Church of God whenever possible, and is in "Ministry Partnership" with a number of them, including Life Resource Ministries, The Living God Ministries, Church of God Big Sandy, United Christian Ministries, Common Ground Christian Ministries, Church of God Cincinnati, Church of God in Miami, Dynamic Christian Ministries, and Haggai 1:14 Ministries.

== Doctrine ==
The CGI follows and believes in many of the basic doctrinal principles shared by other Christian churches such as the inspiration of the scriptures, Christ's bodily resurrection, and the three ordinances of baptism. The church agrees with Protestant theology regarding the tenets of sola scriptura, the priesthood of all believers, and that Justification is a gift given freely by God. Like many Christian churches, it also expresses a belief in the resurrection of the dead, millennialism, baptism by immersion, Gap creationism, and continuationism. However, some of its teachings differ significantly from Catholic and Protestant doctrine in a number of key areas:

Restorationism

Like many churches in the Restorationist movement, CGI believes that a number of today's traditional Christian teachings stem from doctrinal corruption under the influence of Greco-Roman philosophy, Gnosticism, anti-Semitism and mistranslation which occurred early in the history of the church, and believes that the major Christian churches, under the weight of tradition, now teach various pagan ideas and practices that have been synchronized or "syncretised" with Christianity. CGI equates paganism with demonolatry, and teaches that God forbids syncretism with the occult. Much of CGI doctrine that is distinct from mainstream Christianity is the outgrowth of an effort to separate these influences and traditions from what is believed to be the beliefs and practices of the original Apostolic church. For example, CGI teaches that the ancient pagan origins of Christmas, Halloween, and Easter render them inappropriate for Christians because they are offensive to God. This also applies to Valentine's Day and New Year's Day celebrations.

Nontrinitarianism

Doctrinally, CGI is binitarian, believing that the Holy Spirit is the spirit/power of God and of Jesus Christ, rather than a separate entity within the Godhead. God "the Father" and Jesus Christ are viewed as distinct "God beings" in the "God family".

Purpose of man

CGI teaches that Christians are begotten into the family of God, and at their resurrection will experience theosis, being "changed into spirit as a son of God", in the process of God reproducing Himself after His own likeness.

Mortality of the soul

CGI rejects the doctrine of the immortality of the soul as is taught by Catholicism and most major Protestant denominations, in that the soul is not believed to remain conscious after death (until resurrection). CGI believes that the doctrine of the immortality of the soul resulted from doctrinal corruption early in the history of the church.

Kingdom of God

CGI maintains that the core of Jesus Christ's message concerned the coming of a literal earthly kingdom, and that the saved will not go on to heaven, but will live and rule with Jesus on earth during the Millennium after his Second Coming, and will eventually share ruler-ship over the entire universe as part of the "God Family".

Grace, Law and Justification

CGI believes Justification is a free gift given by God after repentance and baptism, but holds that obedience to God's law is necessary even after Justification, because Jesus Christ is said to have come to relieve mankind from sin and the penalty of the law, not from the law itself. It is taught basic Old Testament law carries over into the New Covenant and applies to Christians today, because the Tanakh describes them as "God's laws", not "Jewish laws", and because they are upheld by New Testament scripture and practice. This includes the observance of the seventh-day Sabbath (from Friday sunset to Saturday sunset), abstaining from unclean meats, and observing Holy Day festivals, including removing leavening and eating unleavened bread during the Days of Unleavened Bread, and living in "temporary dwellings" during the Feast of Tabernacles. and condemnation of all sexual sins. This does not include observance of ancient Israelite civil laws, the necessity for physical circumcision, and parts of the law that have to do with approach to God, i.e., sacrificial, temple, and priesthood laws which are believed to have been brought to fulfillment in Jesus Christ. The church observes these laws mostly apart from Jewish tradition (except Jewish calendar calculations, which it views as authoritative) and maintains that this interpretation of law to be historically in agreement with the practice and beliefs of the early Apostolic church. The church rejects replacement theology (supersessionism), i.e., the doctrine that God has rejected the Jewish people and replaced them with the New Testament church. CGI believes that in matters of law and justification, mainstream Christian doctrine misinterprets Pauline theology and is essentially antinomian, and is the result of doctrinal corruption and anti-Semitism which occurred in the early history of the church following the apostolic era.

Christ's sacrifice is viewed as being able to cover any inevitable failed attempts at obedience, except the Unpardonable Sin, i.e., willful impenitence. God's law is not viewed as being of itself punitive, but as having educative value, and it is believed that Jesus magnified the law and its value by applying its spiritual intent, and that Jesus showed how the commandments are far more binding in their spiritual application than in their mere physical application. Obedience to God's law is also seen as being able to build moral character and to significantly improve one's quality of life and to improve society at large, because it is seen as an expression of the mind and character of God. Despite criticism of legalism, CGI staunchly maintains that obedience is not viewed as a "work" to "earn" salvation, but that salvation is a freely given gift from God.

Pre-Siniatic Decalogue

CGI teaches that the Ten Commandments were in force long before Moses, and predated the Flood by centuries, and that this is proven circumstantially in the Old Testament, (though not in precisely the same form as those given at Sinai) thus nullifying arguments that God intended them for Israel only.

Doctrine of Hell

CGI believes that the idea of an ever-burning Hell stems from the influence of paganism and Hellenistic philosophy on rabbinic thought and on Christian doctrine early in the history of the church, and that the scriptures actually teach that the final destination of the unrepentant wicked is literal death, i.e. annihilation or permanent destruction, as opposed to an "eternal life of torture in hell."

Multiple resurrections

CGI holds that people who do not know or understand the truth of the Bible during their lifetime will be given time to learn these teachings after the "Second Resurrection" to a new physical life. After living again in the Millennial world under God's kingdom, those who continue to reject God's Holy Spirit and way of life will be annihilated after the "Third Resurrection", along with unrepentant former believers who had turned away from God. They are destroyed in the Lake of fire.

Tithing

Like many Christian churches, CGI supports the doctrine of Biblical tithing as a personal act of worship; 10 percent of a member's income is given to the church to fund the organization's gospel mission. It is also taught that each member should personally set aside an additional 10 percent of their income, a Second tithe, for personal observance of annual religious festivals, particularly the Feast of Tabernacles.

British Israelism

CGI asserts a belief in British Israelism. This belief is not used to assert racial or ethnic superiority, but solely to interpret End Time prophecies which are believed to be directed at the United States and Europe.

Doctrinal departures from WCG

CGI departs from the original WCG in matters of church government and does not assign its own administration as the "one true church". The WWCG gradually came to teach that the Kingdom of God included the ruler-ship of the ministry in the lives of the congregation. CGI believes that the Kingdom of God is the ruler-ship of Jesus Christ in the individual lives of its members, and that it will include the future ruler-ship of Christ on Earth during the Millennial period. The ministry is considered the servants of the people towards that goal.

The WCG taught that the God of the Old Testament was, in fact, Jesus Christ, and that Christ came to reveal the Father who was previously unknown. The CGI has more recently distanced itself from this doctrine, asserting that both Father and Son are referenced in the Old and New Testament.

Like other Adventist churches, CGI believes that the Second Coming of Christ is imminent and it interprets contemporary events in the light of bible prophecy, but it is also deliberately less dogmatic about prophetic speculative ideas, rejecting the practice of setting dates for the return of Christ, rejecting the WCG's interpretation of the doctrine of Church Eras as proposed by Dr. Herman Hoeh, and rejecting its interpretation of the doctrine of the Place of Safety during the Great Tribulation.

== Message and media ==
With congregations in the United States, Canada, Jamaica, Ireland, Australia and the Philippines, CGI produces a television program titled Armor of God and Prevail Magazine, which cover topics related to Christian living. The church publishes a quarterly newspaper, The International News containing doctrinal articles, world events as they relate to bible prophecy, and church news, and offers children's education through Buckaroo Bob's Neighborhood programming. Twentieth Century Watch, a full-color glossy magazine, was discontinued in 1998.

In 2013, the church decided to push for a more aggressive presence on the internet, and built a new studio to broadcast in high-definition television. The church also hosts a multimedia website and has a presence on YouTube along with a dedicated Roku channel.

The church also supports a program for young adults ages 18–30 called Infuse, which includes a quarterly magazine, a website, and service activities for local churches and communities. The program is run by volunteers and includes older adults who support the program, and is also open to young people in other churches.

== See also ==
- Armstrongism
- Christian observances of Jewish holidays
- Christian views on the Old Covenant

== Bibliography ==
- "Church of God Timeline: 1996 to 2004". The Journal, news of the churches of God. Archived from the original on 2 September 2012.
