= Church of the Blessed Hope =

Small first-day Adventist Christian body

The Church of the Blessed Hope (CBH), also known as the Church of God of the Abrahamic Faith, is a small nontrinitarian sect within Adventist tradition. The group (Note: A number of local congregations in the Church of God (General Conference) use the name "Church of God of the Abrahamic Faith," often leading to confusion of the two bodies. For this reason, the Church of the Blessed Hope has been retained as the denominational title for this article.) observes worship on Sunday rather than the Sabbath and traces its origins to the nineteenth-century Adventist movement. It has historical and theological roots in the Christadelphians and is closely related to the Church of God General Conference (Abrahamic Faith).

== Background ==
Benjamin Wilson spent his early life in Halifax, England. Along with his brothers—Joseph, John, and James—he questioned the teachings of their local Baptist church and became convinced that the biblical promises to Abraham were central to salvation. In 1844, Benjamin and James Wilson emigrated with their families to Geneva, Illinois; John and Joseph followed around 1849. Together, the brothers established a church in Geneva.

During the American Civil War, the group's opposition to military service required the adoption of an official denominational name for purposes of conscientious objection. At Benjamin's suggestion, the name Church of God of the Abrahamic Faith was adopted. Through the efforts of the Wilson family, congregations were established across the United States, from Ohio to California, where Benjamin later relocated. These congregations functioned without a centralized organizational structure.

Benjamin maintained correspondence from 1846 to 1856 with John Thomas, the founder of the Christadelphians, whom he later met in person. From 1856 to 1862, the two men and their associated congregations were in fellowship. In 1863, however, a theological disagreement concerning the Judgment Seat of Christ and the scope of resurrection and accountability led to a division between the groups. This separation was formalized in 1865, when the respective groups registered under different names for conscientious objection during the Civil War.

The CBH originated as a local congregation in Cleveland, Ohio, and was formally organized on October 4, 1863. The church was founded by fourteen individuals under the leadership of Mark Allen, a missionary associated with the Church of God of the Abrahamic Faith movement from Woburn, Massachusetts. Additional congregations were soon established in Salem and Unionville, Ohio, and in 1888 these congregations incorporated collectively as the CBH. All three congregations continue to exist, although the Cleveland congregation later relocated to Chesterland, Ohio. From 1922 to 1927, the Cleveland congregation was led by a minister affiliated with the Christadelphians.

Although the CBH and the Church of God of the Abrahamic Faith differed in name, they were part of the same broader movement. By the early twentieth century, the movement comprised more than 200 congregations across approximately twelve U.S. states, operating as a loose fellowship. Limited organizational cohesion was maintained through state conferences and the publication of a shared periodical, The Restitution.

Following Benjamin's retirement in 1869, his publication The Gospel Banner was merged with Herald of the Coming Kingdom and Bible Instructor, edited by his nephew Thomas Wilson. The merged publication was renamed The Restitution in 1871 and was published in Chicago by Thomas and W. D. St. Clair.

In 1911, disagreement arose within the movement's five-member ministerial association over the appointment of A. R. Underwood of Plymouth, Indiana, as editor of The Restitution. This dispute resulted in a severing of fellowship among the churches. The majority faction, led by L. E. Connor, adopted two additional doctrinal positions to their statement of faith: universal resurrection and open communion. Additionally, they later affirmed the literal and personal existence of Satan. In 1921, this majority reorganized as the Church of God (General Conference) (CoGGC) and began publishing a new periodical, The Restitution Herald, in Oregon, Illinois.

Three congregations in Ohio and one from both Kentucky and Indiana rejected these doctrinal additions and retained the earlier Geneva Statement of Faith. These churches continued publishing The Restitution from Cleveland. The minority congregations maintained informal ties, and in 1966 four of the six congregations adopted a uniform doctrinal statement. Beginning in 1976, these churches—informally known as the Church of God of the Abrahamic Faith—began holding annual gatherings, which continue to be held each August at various colleges in Ohio.

== Faith and practice ==
The CBH rejects the doctrine of the Trinity; regards the Bible as the revealed word of God; and teaches that salvation involves hearing and believing the gospel, confessing faith, and obedience expressed through baptism. Baptism is administered by immersion to believers. The observance of communion, consisting of bread and the cup, is practiced weekly.

The church holds a premillennial eschatology, anticipating the future return and reign of Jesus Christ. It teaches that both the righteous and the unjust who are accountable will be raised from the dead, while those who have not heard the gospel will not be resurrected. The CBH rejects several doctrines adopted by the CoGGF in 1921, including belief in the literal Devil, universal resurrection, and open communion.

Members of the church generally object to military service as combatants, though some congregations permit participation in non-combatant or humanitarian roles.

== Status ==
As of 2003, the CBH comprised eight congregations (Note: Three in Ohio, three in Florida, and one each in Kentucky and Indiana (see Places to Worship).) with a total membership of approximately 400. Three of the congregations, located in Ohio, use the name CBH, while the remaining congregations operate under different local names.

Congregations are theologically closer to the Christadelphians than to the CoGGC, and in recent years efforts have been made to strengthen relationships between the CBH congregations and Christadelphian ecclesias. Many CBH churches use Christadelphian hymnals and Sunday school materials. While maintaining their own local statements of faith, several CBH congregations have also recognized the Birmingham Amended Statement of Faith, a doctrinal statement widely used among Christadelphians.

It is common for members of the CBH who relocate to areas without a local CBH congregation to associate with nearby Christadelphian ecclesias, where they are generally received into fellowship and participate as members. Likewise, Christadelphians are typically accepted into fellowship within CBH congregations.

The annual CBH Gathering, held in Denison, Ohio, has contributed to increased interaction between CBH members and Christadelphians. The event regularly includes participants from both Amended and Unamended Christadelphian fellowships, and CBH members also attend Christadelphian gatherings such as the Great Lakes Christadelphian Bible School. Members of both groups have contributed articles, correspondence, and announcements to each other's periodicals, including The Christadelphian Tidings of the Kingdom of God and the Abrahamic Faith Beacon. CBH members also cooperate with Christadelphian mission and charitable organizations internationally, and online discussion forums have further increased awareness of shared beliefs and distinctions between CBH congregations and the CoGGC.

== See also ==
- Nontrinitarianism
- Non-Trinitarian churches
- Seventh-day Adventism
