= John Thomas (Christadelphian) =

English religious leader (1805–1871)

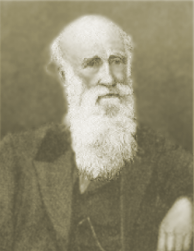
- John Thomas
- Born: 12 April 1805; Hoxton Square, Hackney, London.
- Died: 5 March 1871 (aged 65)

John Thomas (12 April 1805 – 5 March 1871) was a British religious leader and founder of the Christadelphians. He was a dedicated Bible expositor, and author of Elpis Israel, the first major writing to bring to light the subject of "God Manifestation" and the hope of Israel for future generations. In this work, he drew upon his interpretation of Biblical Prophecy to predict the return of Israel in the near future. Thomas has often been branded as a false teacher and a heretic by mainstream Christians due to his prediction that Christ would return in 1866, as well as his denial of the Christian doctrines regarding the Trinity, the personhood of the Devil, and the existence of demons.

== Early life ==
John Thomas was born in Hoxton Square, Hackney, London, on 12 April 1805, the son of a dissenting minister, also named John Thomas. His family is reputed to be descended from French Huguenot refugees. His family moved frequently, as his father took up various pastorates, including that of a congregation in London, a brief stay in northern Scotland, back to London, and then to Chorley, Lancashire. At the age of 16, in Chorley, he began studying medicine. His family moved back to London, but John Thomas stayed in Chorley. After two years, he returned to London to continue his studies at the Guy's and St Thomas's hospitals for a further three years. He trained as a surgeon and had an interest in chemistry and biology, publishing several medical articles in The Lancet, one of which argued in favour of the importance of the use of corpses for the study of medicine (it was illegal in England to dissect them at this time).

== Association with Alexander Campbell ==
Thomas emigrated to North America in 1832, travelling on board the Marquis of Wellesley. Following a near shipwreck he vowed to find out the truth about life and God through personal Biblical study. Initially he sought to avoid the kind of sectarianism he had seen in England. In this he found sympathy with the rapidly emerging Restoration Movement in the United States at the time. This movement sought a reform based upon the Bible alone as a sufficient guide and rejected all creeds. He became convinced by the Restoration Movement of the need for baptism and joined them in October 1832. He soon came to know a prominent leader in the movement, Alexander Campbell, who encouraged him to become an evangelist. He spent his time travelling around the eastern States of America preaching, until eventually settling down as a preacher in Philadelphia. It was here on 1 January 1834 that he married Ellen Hunt.

Thomas also wrote for and was editor of the Apostolic Advocate which first appeared in May 1834. His studies during this period of his life generated the foundation for many of the beliefs he came to espouse as a Christadelphian and he began to believe that the basis of knowledge before baptism was greater than the Restoration Movement believed and also that widely held orthodox Christian beliefs were wrong. While his freedom to believe his unique beliefs was accepted, many objected to the preaching of these beliefs as necessary for salvation. This difference led to a series of debates particularly between Thomas and Alexander Campbell. Because Thomas eventually rebaptised himself and rejected his former beliefs and associations, he was formally disfellowshipped in 1837. Some people, nonetheless, associated with him and accepted his views.

At this time the Millerite or Adventist movement was growing, and in 1843 Thomas was introduced to William Miller, the leader of the Millerites. He admired their willingness to question orthodox beliefs and agreed with their belief in the second coming of Christ and the founding of a millennial age upon His return. Thomas continued his studies of the Bible and in 1846 travelled to New York, where he gave a series of lectures covering 30 doctrinal subjects that later formed part of his book Elpis Israel (The Hope of Israel).

== Christadelphians ==
Based upon his newfound understanding of the Bible, Thomas was rebaptised (a third and final time) in 1847 and the groups of congregations and individuals who shared his beliefs continued to grow. In 1848 the movement became international when he travelled to England in order to preach what he now saw as the true gospel message. Upon his return to America, Thomas moved from Richmond, Virginia to New York City and began to preach there. He made a point of speaking to the Jewish community because Dr Thomas had come to believe that Christianity did not replace the Law of Moses but rather fulfilled it. He believed that Christians must, though faith and baptism, become the "seed" (or, "descendant") of Abraham.

It was at this time that Thomas and those who shared similar beliefs became known as the Royal Association of Believers. This group of believers used the term "ecclesia", a Greek word meaning "assembly", to describe them. However, the movement did not have an ‘official’ name until 1864, when a name was chosen during the American Civil War (see below). Instead of having a system of clergy, all the brethren took equal responsibility on a rota to take on the role of presiding and speaking during their meetings.

When in 1861 the American Civil War broke out, Thomas travelled to the South and became concerned that the war had placed believers upon opposing sides. The movement as a whole considered that the war required them to make a stand for what they believed in as conscientious objectors. In order to be exempted from military service, it was required that believers had to belong to a recognised religious group that did not agree with participation in war. Thus in 1864, Thomas coined the name Christadelphian to identify members of the movement. The term Christadelphian comes from Greek and means "Brethren in Christ". It was during the war that Thomas worked on the three volumes of Eureka, which discusses the meaning of the Book of Revelation.

On 5 May 1868, Thomas returned to England, where he travelled extensively giving lecturers about the Gospel message and meeting with Christadelphians in England. During this period of his life he found extensive support and help from Robert Roberts who had been converted during a previous visit to England by Thomas. Following his return to America, he made one final tour of the Christadelphian congregations prior to his death on 5 March 1871 in Jersey City. He was buried in the Green-Wood Cemetery, Brooklyn, New York.

== Legacy ==
Thomas did not claim to be any kind of prophet, or in any way inspired, but through study and borrowing from the work of others he believed that many traditional church teachings were incorrect and that from the Bible he could prove that position.

The Lecturer [John Thomas] commenced by denying a statement which had appeared in many of the London and county newspapers, and amongst them, one made by a religious Editor in this town, to the effect that he assumed to himself the true, infallible, prophetic character, as one sent from God, verbatim. He would appeal to his writings -- and he had written a great deal in twelve years -- and to his speeches, whether he had ever claimed to be such, in the remotest degree whatever. He believed truth as it was taught in the scriptures of truth....

Modern Christadelphians generally believe Thomas was right and adhere to the positions he established as defined within the Christadelphian statements of faith; Christadelphians feel, too, that Thomas' example of an inquiring attitude is also an important legacy.

Thomas wrote several books, one of which, Elpis Israel (1848), in its first section, sets out many of the fundamental scriptural principles believed by Christadelphians to this day.

Thomas' exposition of Bible prophecy led to him making various detailed predictions about then current-day events of which some did not come to pass, as was noted in the foreword to subsequent editions of Elpis Israel after his death, a point that Thomas himself accepted could happen.

== Bibliography ==
=== Books ===
- Elpis Israel (1848)
- Eureka: An Exposition of the Apocalypse (In 5 Volumes)
- Exposition of Daniel (1868)

=== Booklets ===
- Anastasis
- The Apostacy Unveiled (1872)
- Blasphemy and the Names of Blasphemy
- The Book Unsealed: A Lecture on the Prophetic Periods of Daniel and John (1869)
- Catechesis
- Chronikon Hebraikon
- Destiny of the British Empire as revealed in the Scriptures (1871)
- Eternal Life (1848)
- Faith In the Last Days (posthumous anthology of writings from 1845 to 1861)
- How to Search the Scriptures (1867)
- The Last Days of Judah's Commonwealth
- Mystery of the Covenant of the Holy Land Explained (1854)
- Odology
- Phanerosis (1869)
- The Revealed Mystery

=== Magazines ===
- The Apostolic Advocate (Editor) (1834–39)
- The Herald of the Future Age (Editor) (1843–49)
- Herald of the Kingdom and Age to Come (Editor) (1851–61)

== Bibliography ==
- Peter Hemingray, John Thomas, His Friends and His Faith (2003: ISBN 81-7887-012-6)
- Charles H. Lippy, The Christadelphians in North America (Lewiston/Queenston: Edwin Mellen Press, 1989).
- Robert Roberts, Dr Thomas: His Life and Work (Birmingham: The Christadelphian, 1873). Available online, AngelFire.com.
- Bryan R. Wilson, Sects and Society: A Sociological Study of the Elim Tabernacle, Christian Science and Christadelphians (London: Heinemann, 1961; Berkeley/Los Angeles: University of California Press, 1961).
