= Meier (surname) =

Meier (German pronunciation: [ˈmaɪ̯ɐ]) is a variant of the German surname Meyer.

== Disambiguation pages ==
- Armin Meier
- Arthur Meier
- Christian Meier
- Christina Meier
- Dominic Meier
- Eugen Meier
- Georg Meier
- Heinz Meier
- Johannes Meier
- John Meier
- Patrick Meier
- Paul Meier
- Raymond Meier
- Richard Meier

== Individuals ==
- Adolf Meier (1902–1949), Swiss athlete
- Albert Meier, Swiss footballer
- Alexander Meier (born 1983), German footballer
- Andre Meier (born 1965), Swiss footballer
- Andreas Meier (born 1962), Swiss businessman, agricultural engineer, oenologist and politician
- Anne-Gudrun Meier-Scherling (1906–2002), German lawyer
- Annelies Meier, Swiss orienteering competitor
- Annemarie Sylvia Meier (born 1957), German chess master
- Arnd Meier (born 1973), German race car driver
- August Meier (1923–2003), American historian
- Barbara Meier (born 1986), German model
- Barbara Meier (born 1962), Swiss curler
- Barry Meier, American writer and journalist
- Beat Meier (1959–2016), Swiss biathlete
- Ben Meier (1918–1995), American politician
- Bernd Meier (1972–2002), German football goalkeeper
- Bernd Meier (1944–2005), German politician
- Bertram Meier (born 1960), German Roman-Catholic bishop
- Billy Meier (born 1937), Swiss ufologist
- Brad Meier (born 1967), Canadian ice hockey official
- Burkhard Meier (1943–2001), German music educator and composer
- Carl Alfred Meier (1905–1995), Swiss psychiatrist and psychologist
- Carson Meier (born 1995), American football player
- Charles Meier, Mexican politician
- Christa Meier (1941–2024), German politician
- Christine Meier (born 1986), Swiss ice hockey player
- Christoph Meier (born 1993), Liechtensteiner swimmer
- Claude Meier (born 1964), Swiss Army officer
- Claudia Meier, German Paralympic athlete
- Claudia Meier Volk (born 1947), American politician and nurse
- Curt Meier (born 1953), American politician
- Dave Meier (born 1959), American baseball player
- David Meier (1891–1986), Mayor of Mauren
- Deborah Meier (born 1931), American educator
- Diana Meier, American basketball player
- Diane Meier (born 1943), advertising executive
- Diane E. Meier (born 1952), American geriatrician and palliative care specialist
- Dieter Meier (born 1945), Swiss musician
- Dione Meier (born 1981), Canadian softball player
- Dirk Meier (born 1964), East German retired cyclist
- Doreen Meier (born 1968), German former footballer and manager
- Dutch Meier (1879–1948), American baseball player
- Dylan Meier (1984–2010), American football quarterback
- Edward Daniel Meier (1841–1914), American mechanical engineer
- Else Meier (1901–1933), German politician
- Emerenz Meier (1874–1928), German writer
- Erica Meier, American animal rights advocate, president and executive director
- Erich Meier (1935–2010), German footballer
- Ernst Heinrich Meier (1813–1866), German orientalist
- Florian Meier (born 1988), Liechtenstein politician
- Franz Meier (1924–2015), Liechtenstein politician
- Frederic Alfred Meier (1887–1954), British schoolmaster and headmaster
- Frithjov Meier Vik (1902–1986), Norwegian politician
- Fritz Meier (1912–1998), Swiss orientalist
- Garry Meier (born 1949), American radio personality
- Guido Meier (born 1948), Liechtenstein lawyer and politician
- Günther Meier (1941–2020), German amateur boxer
- Gustav Meier (1929–2016), Swiss-born conductor and director
- Hans Eduard Meier (1922–2014), Swiss type designer
- Harald Meier, German herpetologist
- Heinrich Meier (born 1953), German philosopher
- Helen Meier (1929–2021), Swiss writer and teacher
- Herbert Meier (1928–2018), Swiss writer and translator
- Jennifer Meier (born 1981), German footballer
- Johann Meier (disambiguation)
- Johanna Meier (born 1938), American operatic soprano
- Jonathan Meier (born 1999), German footballer
- Josef Meier (1874–1945), German missionary and ethnologist
- Josephine Meier (1926–2006), Swiss politician and feminist
- Jost Meier (1939–2022), Swiss composer and orchestra conductor
- Julius Meier (disambiguation)
- Karl Meier (1897–1974), Swiss actor and magazine editor
- Katie Meier (born 1967), American basketball coach
- Katja Meier (born 1979), justice minister of Saxony
- Kenneth J. Meier (born 1950), American professor
- Kerry Meier (born 1986), American football player
- Kersten Meier (1954–2001), German swimmer
- Kristen Meier (born 1991), American professional soccer midfielder and defender
- Kurt Meier (born 1962), Swiss bobsledder
- Lea Meier (born 2001), Swiss biathlete
- Lisa Meier, American politician
- Livio Meier (born 1998), Liechtensteiner footballer
- Maaris Meier (born 1983), Estonian cyclist
- Marc Meier, president of Bosch Healthcare Solutions GmbH
- Mark Meier (1925–2012), American glaciologist
- Marlene Meier (born 2002), German sprint hurdler
- Martin Meier (born 1984), Swiss bobsledder
- Max Meier (born 1936), Swiss boxer
- Megan Meier (1992–2006), victim of cyberbullying
- Melanie Meier (born 1967), American politician
- Michael Meier (1928–2022), German archbishop
- Michael Meier-Brügger (born 1948), Swiss linguist and Indo-Europeanist
- Miloš Meier (born 1984), Czech drummer
- Moritz Hermann Eduard Meier (1796–1855), German classical philologist
- Myka Meier (born 1982), American-British writer
- Naomi Meier (1926–1989), American professional baseball player
- Noah Meier (born 2002), Swiss ice hockey defenseman
- Norbert Meier (born 1958), German former football player
- Olivia Meier (born 1999), Canadian para badminton player
- Otto Meier, Swiss footballer
- Pirmin Meier (born 1947), Swiss author and teacher
- Randy Meier, American journalist
- Reinhard Meier (1946–2020), German football player
- Rob Meier (born 1977), American football player
- Robert Meier (1897–2007), German centenarian
- Roland Meier (born 1967), Swiss cyclist
- Romano Meier (born 1995), Swiss curler
- Rudolf Meier (1939–2018), Swiss Olympic boxer
- Sarah Meier (born 1984), Swiss figure skater
- Sascha Meier (born 1997), German politician
- Shad Meier (born 1978), American football player
- Shane Meier (born 1977), Canadian actor
- Shirley Meier, Canadian science fiction and fantasy writer
- Sid Meier (born 1954), computer game programmer and designer
- Siegfried Meier (born 1977), German-born Canadian record producer and recording, mixing and mastering engineer
- Silke Meier (born 1968), German tennis player
- Silvio Meier (1965–1992), East German activist killed by neo-Nazis
- Simone Meier (born 1965), Swiss middle-distance runner
- Stefan Meier (1889–1944), German politician
- Susan Meier (born 1956), American novelist
- Thomas Meier (disambiguation)
- Timo Meier (born 1996), Swiss ice hockey player
- Tony Meier (born 1990), American basketball player
- Trevor Meier (born 1973), Canadian ice hockey player
- Ulrike Meier Yang, German-American applied mathematician and computer scientist
- Urs Meier (born 1959), Swiss football referee
- Urs Meier (footballer) (born 1961), Swiss football manager
- Ursula Meier (born 1971), French-Swiss film director and screenwriter
- Walter Meier (1927–2017), German athlete
- Walther Meier (1910–1991), Swiss field hockey player
- Waltraud Meier (born 1956), German mezzo-soprano
- Werner Meier (born 1949), Swiss middle-distance runner
- Werner Meier (born 1937), Swiss footballer
- Wes Meier (born c. 1968–69), American football coach
- Willi Meier (1907–1979), German athlete
- Wolfgang Meier (1878–1945), German farmer and concentration camp inmate
- Wolfram Meier-Augenstein, Scottish professor
- Yaël Meier (born 2000), Swiss businesswoman, journalist, lecturer and former actress

== People with similar surnames ==
- Hildreth Meière (1892–1961), American artist

== See also ==
- Meyer (surname)
- Meyer (disambiguation)
- Meier (disambiguation)
- Von Meyer
- Myer
- Meyr
- Meijer (surname)
- Meir
- Mayer
- Maier
- Mayr
- Mair
- Meyers
- Myers
- Meyerson
