= Myers (disambiguation) =

Myers is a common surname, and may also refer to:

== Places ==
- Myers, Kentucky, United States
- Myers, Montana, United States
- Fort Myers, Florida, United States
- Myers City, South Dakota, United States
- Myers Flat, California
- Myers Park (disambiguation) (various)
- Myersville, Maryland, United States
- Myersville, Ohio, United States
- Myerstown, Pennsylvania, United States

== Other uses ==
- Myers v. United States, 1926 United States Supreme Court decision
- Myers department store, a former department store in Whittier, California, rebranded as Boston Stores in 1976
- Myers Hall (disambiguation), various
- Myers theorem, in Riemannian geometry
- Myers–Briggs Type Indicator, personality questionnaire
- O’Melveny & Myers, international law firm in Los Angeles, California, USA
- Stover-Myers Mill, in Bucks County, Pennsylvania, USA

== See also ==
- Maier
- Mair (disambiguation)
- Mayer (disambiguation)
- Mayr
- Meier (disambiguation)
- Meir (disambiguation)
- Meyer (disambiguation)
- Meyers
- Meyr (disambiguation)
- Myer (disambiguation)
- Von Meyer
- Justice Myers (disambiguation)
