= Meyers (disambiguation) =

Meyers is a common surname, and may also refer to:

Meyers may also refer to:

== Characters ==
- Professor Alex Meyers, character played by Christine Taylor in "The Professor", a 2006 episode of the TV series My Name Is Earl
- Mort Meyers, recurring character in the TV series Arrested Development played by Jeff Garlin
- Roger Meyers, Jr., recurring character in the American animated TV series The Simpsons
- Takuto Meyers (タクト マイヤーズ, Takuto Maiyaazu), protagonist of the manga and video-game series Galaxy Angel
- Leslie Meyers, character in the American animated TV series South Park

== Places ==
- Meyers, California, in El Dorado County
- Meyers Chuck, Alaska, USA, census-designated place
- Meyers Corners, hamlet in the town of Bethlehem, New York, USA
- Meyers Lake, Ohio, USA, village
- Meyers Nunatak, in Antarctica

== Other uses ==
- Meyers Aircraft Company, in USA
  - Meyers 200, light aircraft
- Meyers Farm, in the Hanover Zoo, in Hanover, Germany
- Meyers Konversations-Lexikon, German encyclopedia
- Meyers Blitz-Lexikon, a 1924 German print encyclopedia, now in the public domain
- Meyers Manx, dune buggy
- Albertus L. Meyers Bridge, in Allentown, Pennsylvania, USA
- Keith & Meyers Dry Goods Store, original location of the Topeka & Shawnee County Public Library, USA
- Lock 9 Meyers, Trent-Severn Waterway
- Thorvald Meyers gate, main street, Grünerløkka, Oslo, Norway

== Common misspellings ==
- Bristol-Myers Squibb, an American pharmaceutical corporation
- Liggett and Myers Tobacco Company, an American tobacco company currently known as the Liggett Group
- Myers–Briggs Type Indicator, a personality indicator designed to identify personal preferences

== See also ==
- Myers (disambiguation)
- Myer (disambiguation)
- Meyr (disambiguation)
- Meyer (disambiguation)
- Meier (disambiguation)
- Meir (disambiguation)
- Maier
- Mayer (disambiguation)
- Mair (disambiguation)
- Mayr
- Von Meyer
