= Meyers =

Origin
- Origin: England, Ireland, Scotland, Ashkenazi Jews

Other names
- Variant forms: Myers, Myars, Miares, Myeres, MacMoyers

Meyers is a surname of English origin; many branches of the Meyers family trace their origins to Anglo-Saxon England. The name is derived from the Old French name Maire, meaning an officer in charge of legal matters. The English surname may also mean "physician" (from mire, Old French), or "marsh" (from myrr, Old Norse). The name may also be an Anglicization of the Irish surname ó Meidhir or one of the Scottish surname MacMoyers

== Notable people ==
- Abby Meyers (born 1999), American basketball player
- Adam Meyers (1812–1875), lawyer and political figure in Canada West
- Al Meyers (1908–1976), American pioneer aviator
- Albert Meyers (1932–2007), American organic chemist
- Albertus L. Meyers (1890–1979), American music conductor and cornet player
- Amy Meyers, American art historian
- Ann Meyers (born 1955), American basketball player and sportscaster
- Anne Akiko Meyers (born 1970), American concert violinist
- Annette Meyers (born 1934), American mystery writer
- Annie Meyers (1873–1942), owner of the first guest house
- Ari Meyers (born 1969), American actress, Kate & Allie
- Ari Benjamin Meyers, American artist and composer
- Augie Meyers (1940–2026), American musician
- August Meyers (1864–1951), American politician
- Augustus Meyers (1841–1919), American Civil War soldier and author
- Ben Meyers (born 1998), American ice hockey player
- Benjamin Franklin Meyers (1833–1918), American politician
- Bennett Meyers (1895–1979), United States Air Force major general
- Bernard C. Meyers, American photographer
- Beth Meyers (born 1959), American politician
- Bethany C. Meyers, American fitness instructor
- Brad Meyers (born 1980), Australian rugby player
- Bruce F. Meyers, American car designer and entrepreneur, Meyers Manx dune buggy
- Carl Meyers, American investment manager and politician
- Carol Meyers (born 1942), American feminist biblical scholar
- Carole Meyers (died 2007), rabbi
- Carolyn Meyers, president of Jackson State University
- Chad Meyers (born 1975), baseball player
- Charlie Meyers, American politician and soldier
- Chief Meyers (1880–1971), baseball player
- Dave Meyers (disambiguation), several people
- Deacon Meyers (1899–1978), American baseball player
- Debbie Meyers-Martin, American politician
- Derek Meyers (1977–2023), Canadian politician
- Diana Tietjens Meyers, philosopher
- Dohnte Meyers (born 2000), American football player
- Edward H. Meyers, American lawyer
- Elvet Meyers (born 1960), sailor
- Eric Meyers (disambiguation), several people
- Errol Solomon Meyers (1890–1956), Brisbane doctor
- Françoise Bettencourt Meyers (born 1953), French heiress and author
- Franklin Meyers (born 1967), Dutch politician
- Franz Meyers (1908–2002), German politician
- Fred Meyers (born 1983), American actor
- Freddie Meyers (1932–2015), former Canadian football player
- G. Bruce Meyers (born 1948), American politician
- George Meyers (1865–1943), baseball player
- Gerald C. Meyers (1928–2023), American industrialist
- Glenn Meyers (born 1961), American archer
- Hack Meyers (1973–2015), American professional wrestler
- Hallie Meyers-Shyer (born 1987), American actress and filmmaker
- Harrie Meyers (1879–1928), Dutch track cyclist
- Hazel Meyers, American singer
- Helene Meyers, American writer, author, and professor
- J. E. Meyers (1862–1944), American insurance salesman, philanthropist, and politician
- Jack Meyers, American music promoter
- Jake Meyers (born 1996), American baseball player
- Jakobi Meyers (born 1996), American football player
- Jan Meyers (1928–2019), American politician
- Jeffrey Meyers (born 1939), American biographer, literary, art and film critic
- Jerry Meyers (born 1965), American college baseball coach
- Jill Meyers (born 1950), American bridge player
- Joe Meyers (disambiguation), several people
- Joel Meyers, American sportscaster
- John Meyers (disambiguation), several people
- Jonathan Rhys Meyers (born 1977), Irish actor
- Josh Meyers (disambiguation), multiple people
- Julie Meyers (born 2000), Belgian artistic gymnast
- Klinks Meyers (1890–1933), American football player
- Krystal Meyers (born 1988), American Christian rock musician
- Lanny Meyers (born 1956), American composer, orchestrator, principal arranger, and musical director
- Lauren Meyers, American integrative biologist
- Lawrence Steven Meyers (1956–2023), American actor and film producer
- Leroy F. Meyers (1927–1995), mathematician
- Linda Meyers (born 1937), American alpine skier
- Linn Meyers (born 1968), American artist
- Lou Meyers (1859–1920), baseball player
- Louis Meyers (1955–2016), American festival organizer
- Marc A. Meyers (born 1946), American materials scientist and engineer
- Marc Meyers, American feature film director and screenwriter
- Marilyn Meyers (born 1942), American diplomat
- Mark Meyers (disambiguation), several people
- Mary Meyers (1946–2024), American speed skater
- Maury Meyers (1932–2014), American politician
- Mike Meyers (disambiguation), several people
- Nancy Meyers (born 1949), American film director, producer, and screenwriter
- Nina Palmquist Meyers, wife of Earl Warren
- Pat Meyers (born 1954), American golfer
- Paul Meyers (disambiguation)
- Randall Meyers, American composer
- Randy Susan Meyers (born 1952), American writer
- Reba Meyers, American guitarist and vocalist
- Rebecca Meyers (born 1994), American Paralympic swimmer
- Ric Meyers (born 1953), American author, ghostwriter, screenwriter, consultant, actor, editor and teacher
- Richard Meyers (born 1949), better known as Richard Hell, American punk-rock singer, songwriter, and bass guitarist
- Rick Meyers (born 1958), American tennis player
- Robert Meyers (disambiguation), several people
- Robin Meyers, American Christian minister, peace activist, philosopher and author
- Roger Meyers, Sr., fictional founder of Itchy and Scratchy Studios
- Ron Meyers (disambiguation), several people
- Scott Meyers (born 1959), American computer programmer
- Seth Meyers (born 1973), American actor and comedian, host of Late Night with Seth Meyers
- Shep Meyers (1936–2009), American musician
- Sheri Meyers, American marriage and family therapist, television talk show host and author
- Sidney Meyers (1906–1969), American film director and editor
- Stephenie Meyer (born 1973), American novelist and film producer
- Susannah Meyers, American colonel
- Sydney Herbert Meyers, of Eedle and Meyers
- Timothy Meyers (1945–1989), American actor
- Tubby Meyers (1887–1940), American football player and coach
- Victor Aloysius Meyers (1897–1991), American politician and jazz bandleader
- Walter E. Meyers (1939–2022), American academic, professor and linguist
- Ward Meyers (1908–1987), American basketball player and coach
- Wayne M. Meyers (1924–2018), American physician, microbiologist, chemist, humanitarian and medical missionary
- William Meyers (disambiguation)

== See also ==
- Meyers Konversations-Lexikon, a major German encyclopedia that existed from 1839 until 1984
- Miss Meyers (1949–1963), an American racehorse
- Lori Meyers, a Spanish indie rock pop group
- Løgismose Meyers, a food company based in Copenhagen, Denmark
- David Meyers (disambiguation)
- Eric Meyers (disambiguation)
- Josh Meyers (disambiguation)
- Meyer's Department Store
- Meyers House (disambiguation)
- Related surnames: Myers, Meijers, Meyer, De Meyer, Von Meyer, Meier, Meijer, Myer, Meyr, Mayer, Mayr, Maier, Meir, Mair, Meyerson, Myerson
