= Mair (surname) =

Surname list Mair Leslie Leigh Canadian businessman

Mair is a surname in the Scots and German languages, deriving from Latin maior ('greater'). Notable people with the surname include:

People with the surname Mair in Scots context

- Adam Mair (born 1979), Canadian ice hockey player
- Alan Mair, Scottish musician, songwriter and record producer
- Andrew Mair, Scottish football player
- Angharad Mair, Welsh television presenter
- Archie Mair (born 2001), Scottish footballer
- Bobby Mair, Canadian stand-up comedian
- Caitlin Mair (born 2003), Australian cricketer
- Charles Mair (1838–1927), Canadian poet, son of Scottish immigrants
- Colin Mair (1919–2006), Scottish educator
- Eddie Mair (born 1965), Scottish television and radio presenter
- Emily Mair (1928–2021), Scottish-born New Zealand opera singer, pianist and vocal coach
- Ernest Mair (1891–1957), Australian rugby league football coach
- Francis S. Mair, British chemist
- Frederick Mair (1901–1959), Australian cricketer
- George Herbert Mair (1887–1926), British journalist and civil servant
- Gordon Mair (born 1958), Scottish football player
- Harold Mair (1919–2011), Australian politician
- Helen Mair (1924–2016), English physician and medical author
- Hugh Mair, Scottish footballer
- Keith Mair, New Zealand basketball coach and administrator
- Ken Mair, New Zealand politician
- Lee Mair (born 1980), Scottish footballer
- Lorraine Mair, New Zealand netball player
- Lucy Mair (1901–1986), British anthropologist
- Norman Mair (1928–2014), Scottish rugby player and analyst
- Rafe Mair (1931–2017), Canadian political commentator
- Robert Mair, Baron Mair (born 1950), Master of Jesus College, Cambridge
- Rosemary Mair (born 1998), New Zealand cricketer
- Sarah Mair (1846–1941), Scottish campaigner for women's suffrage and education
- Suzi Mair (born 1967), Scottish journalist and former professional tennis player

People with the surname Mair from Ireland

- Peter Mair (1951–2011), Irish political scientist

People with the surname Mair in German context

- Mair von Landshut, late 15th-century German engraver
- Aaron Mair, American environmentalist
- Amanda Mair (born 1994), Swedish singer and musician
- Chiara Mair (born 1996), Austrian alpine skier
- Franz Mair (1821–1893), Austrian composer and choral conductor
- Klaus Mair (born 1977), Austrian politician
- Liz Mair (born 1978), American political and communications consultant
- Michael Mair (born 1962), Italian skier
- Natascha Mair (born 1995), Austrian ballet dancer
- Paulus Hector Mair (1517–1579), Augsburg civil servant
- Victor H. Mair, American Professor of Chinese Language and Literature
- Walter Mair (born 1978), Austrian-born composer
- Wolfgang Mair (born 1980), Austrian footballer

People with the surname Mair in Spanish context

- Adlin Mair-Clarke (1941–2020), Jamaican athlete
- Gregory Mair, Jamaican politician
- Lucille M. Mair (1924–2009), Jamaican ambassador, author, diplomat and gender specialist
- Sigisfredo Mair (1939–1977), Italian luger

== Disambiguation ==
- Alexander Mair, various people
- David Mair, various people
- Gilbert Mair, various people
- Jim Mair, various people
- John Mair, various people
- Simon Mair, various people
- Thomas Mair, various people
- William Mair, various people

== See also ==
- Maier
- Mayer (disambiguation)
- Mayr
- Meyer (disambiguation)
- Meyr (disambiguation)
- Meier (disambiguation)
- Meir (disambiguation)
