= Meyr (surname) =

Meyr is a surname. Notable people with the surname include:

- Heinrich Mayr (1854–1911), German scientist
- Melchior Meyr (1810–1871), German poet, novelist and philosopher
- Wilhelm Meyr, Jesuit missionary, died at sea in 1699 or 1700 during a voyage with Johann Ernst Hanxleden to the Middle East and Asia

== See also ==
- Myer (disambiguation)
- Meir (disambiguation)
- Mayr
- Meyer (disambiguation)
- Von Meyer
- Meier (disambiguation)
- Maier
- Mayer (disambiguation)
- Mair (disambiguation)
- Myers
- Meyers
