= Maior =

Maior (also spelled major) (Latin, 'greater') gives its name to several occupations such as maior domus, major, and mayor, and thus many surnames, especially German surnames like Maier, Meier, Meyer, Meir, Mayer, Meyr, and the Dutch surname Meijer.

Notable people with the name Maior include:

== People ==
- Maior of Arabia, (3rd-century) Roman sophist and rhetorician
- Álvaro Luiz Maior de Aquino, (born 1977), Brazilian footballer
- Augustin Maior (1882-1963), Romanian physicist
- George Maior (born 1967), Romanian politician and espionage chief
- Grigore Maior (1715-1785), Romanian bishop
- Norbert Maior (born 1998), Romanian rally driver
- Petru Maior (1756-1821), Romanian writer and priest

== See also ==
- The dictionary definition of maior at Wiktionary
- Major (disambiguation)
