= Maier =

Maier is a surname of German origin.

It is a variant spelling of the more usual "Meyer", which is cognate with the English word "mayor", but with a different meaning.

Individuals with the surname include:

- Albert Maier, founder of the German Christadelphians
- Alex Maier (born 2000), American long-distance runner
- Alexander Maier (born 1974), Austrian snowboarder
- Andreas Maier (born 1972), American soccer player
- Anneliese Maier (1905–1971), German historian of philosophy
- Ariane Maier (born 1981), Austrian handball player
- Armin Maier (born 1997), Singaporean footballer
- Arne Maier (born 1999), German football player
- Barbara Maier Gustern (1935–2022), American vocal coach and singer
- Ben Maier (born 2008), American auto racing driver
- Benjamin Maier (born 1994), Austrian bobsledder
- Bernd Maier (born 1974), German football player
- Bernhard Maier (born 1963), German professor of religious studies
- Bob Maier (1915–1993), American baseball player
- Charles Maier (disambiguation), several people
- Christine Maier (born 1965), Swiss television presenter and journalist
- Christoph Maier (born 1984), German politician
- Christopher Maier, American government official
- Colin Maier (born 1976), Canadian musician
- Corinne Maier (born 1963), French writer
- Dana Jeri Maier (born 1982), American artist, cartoonist and author
- Daniel Maier (born 1968), English comedy writer, television, radio and stage performer
- Daniela Maier (born 1996), German freestyle skier
- David Maier (born 1953), American computer scientist
- Dick Maier (1925–2017), American politician
- Elisabeth Maier (born 1994), Canadian skeleton racer
- Enrique Maier (1910–1981), Spanish tennis player
- Ernesto Maier (born 1946), Italian luger
- Florian Maier (disambiguation)
- Fran Maier, American technology entrepreneur
- Fred Anton Maier (1938–2015), Norwegian speed skater
- Georg Maier (1941–2021), German actor and theatre director
- Georg Maier (politician) (born 1967), German politician
- George Maier, American football player and coach
- Gerald Maier (1928–2025), Canadian engineer and oilman
- Gustav Maier (1906–?), German rower
- Guy Maier (1891–1956), American musician
- Hans Maier (disambiguation), several people
- Harald Maier (born 1960), Austrian cyclist
- Harold G. Maier (1937–2014), American legal scholar
- Heinrich Maier (1908–1945), Roman Catholic priest
- Heinz Maier-Leibnitz (1911–2000), German physicist
- Helmut Maier (born 1953), German mathematician
- Henry Maier (1918–1994), American politician
- Herbert Maier (1893–1969), American architect
- Heribert Maier (1932–2007), Austrian trade union leader
- Hermann Maier (born 1972), Austrian alpine skier
- Humberto Maier (born 2005), Brazilian motorcycle racer
- Jake Maier (born 1997), American football quarterback
- Jarrett Maier (born 1998), American actor
- Jeffrey Maier (born 1984), 1996 World Series baseball fan
- Jens Maier (born 1962), German politician (AfD)
- Jessica Maier (born 1994), Brazilian group rhythmic gymnast
- Joachim Maier (born 1955), German chemist
- Father Joe Maier (born 1939), American-born Thai Redemptorist priest
- Johann Maier (disambiguation)
- Johanna Maier (born 1951), Austrian chef
- John Mayer (born 1977), American singer, songwriter and guitarist
- Jonathan Maier (born 1992), German basketball player
- Juliane Maier (born 1987), German footballer
- Jürgen Maier (born 1964), British-Austrian businessman
- Karl Maier (disambiguation), several people
- Katerina Maier, Russian composer
- Ladislav Maier (born 1966), Czech footballer
- Leonie Maier (born 1992), German footballer
- Leopold Maier-Labergo (1907–1939), German figure skater
- Lothar Maier (born 1944), German politician
- Marco Maier (born 1999), German cross-country skier and biathlete
- Marcus Maier (born 1995), Austrian footballer
- Markus Maier (1911–2010), Austrian skier
- Martin Maier (1840–1893), Union Army soldier
- Merwin Maier (1908–1942), American bridge player
- Michael Maier (1568–1622), German physician, counselor, alchemist, and epigramist
- Michal Maier (born 1964), Czech yacht racer
- Mitch Maier (born 1982), American baseball player
- Nico Maier (born 2000), Swiss footballer
- Norman Maier (1900–1977), American experimental psychologist
- Otto Maier (disambiguation), several people
- Ovidiu Maier (born 1971), Romanian footballer
- Pamela Maier, American politician
- Patrik Maier (born 1996), Slovak ice hockey player
- Paul L. Maier (1930–2025), American history professor and novelist
- Pauline Maier (1938–2013), American history professor
- Ramona Maier (born 1995), German footballer
- Raphael Maier (born 1992), Austrian skeleton racer
- Reinhold Maier (1889–1971), German politician
- Robert Maier (born 1950), American filmmaker
- Rolf Maier (1936–2023), French weightlifter
- Ronald V. Maier (born 1947), American Trauma Surgeon
- Rudi Maier (1945–2017), West German fencer
- Rudolf Robert Maier 1824–1888), German pathologist
- Ruth Maier (c. 1920–1942), Austrian author and Holocaust victim
- Sabrina Maier (born 1994), Austrian alpine ski racer
- Samuel Maier (born 1999), Austrian skeleton athlete
- Sascha Maier (born 1974), German footballer
- Sebastian Maier (born 1993), German footballer
- Sepp Maier (born 1944), retired German football goalkeeper
- Sepp Maier (skier) (1935–2012), German cross-country skier
- Silke Maier-Witt (born 1950), German terrorist
- Stefano Maier (born 1992), German footballer
- Thomas Maier, American author, journalist and television producer
- Thomas Maier (footballer) (born 1998), Austrian footballer
- Tomas Maier, German fashion designer
- Ulrike Maier (1967–1994), Austrian alpine skier
- Viktor Maier (born 1990), Kyrgyz footballer
- Vivian Maier (1926–2009), amateur photographer
- Walter A. Maier (1893–1950), American radio personality and theologian
- Willi Maier (born 1948), German middle-distance runner
- William J. Maier (1876–1941), New York State politician
- Wolfgang Maier (born 1949), German psychiatrist and psychotherapist
- Yuri Maier (born 1989), Argentine Olympic wrestler

== See also ==
- Mair, Mayer, Mayr, Meier, Meir, Meyer, Meyers, Meyr, Miers, Myer, Myer, Myers, Myr, Von Meyer
