= Meir =

Meir (Hebrew: מֵאִיר) is a Jewish male given name and an occasional surname. It means "one who shines". It is often Germanized as Maier, Mayer, Mayr, Meier, Meyer, Meijer, Italianized as Miagro, or Anglicized as Mayer, Meyer, or Myer. Notable people with the name include:

Given name:

- Rabbi Meir, Jewish sage who lived in the time of the Mishna
- Jacob ben Meir, known as Rabbeinu Tam (1100–1171), renowned Ashkenazi rabbi, French Tosafist, and leading halakhic authority in his generation
- Meir Amit (1921–2009), Israeli general and politician
- Meir Ariel (1942–1999), Israeli singer/songwriter
- Meir Bar-Ilan (1880–1949), rabbi and Religious Zionism leader
- Meir Ben Baruch (1215–1293) aka Meir of Rothenburg, a German rabbi, poet, and author
- Meir Daloya (1956–2024), Olympic weightlifter
- Meir Dizengoff (1861–1936), Israeli politician
- Meir Har-Zion (1934–2014), Israeli commando fighter
- Meir Dagan (1945–2016), Mossad chief
- Meir Kahane (1932–1990), rabbi and political activist
- Meir Lublin (1558–1616), Polish rabbi, Talmudist and Posek
- Meir Nitzan (1931–2025), the mayor of Rishon-LeZion, Israel
- Meir Pa'il (1926–2015), Israeli politician and military historian
- Meir Shalev (1948–2023), Israeli writer
- Meir Shamgar (1925–2019), Israeli President of the Israeli Supreme Court
- Meir Shapiro (1887–1933), Hasidic Rabbi and creator of the Daf Yomi
- Meir Simcha of Dvinsk (1843–1926), rabbi and leader of Orthodox Judaism in Eastern Europe
- Meir Zorea (1923–1995), Israeli general and politician
- Meir Sheetrit (born 1948), a current Israeli Knesset member for the Kadima party
- Meir Talmi (1909–1994), Israeli politician
- Meir Tamari (1927–2021), South African-Israeli economist
- Meir Tapiro (born 1975), Israeli basketball player, and current CEO of Ironi Nes Ziona
- Meir Teomi (1898–1947), Ukrainian actor
- Meir Teper, American film producer and businessman
- Meir Tobianski (1904–1948), Israeli officer wrongly executed as a traitor
- Israel Meir Kagan (1838–1933), Polish rabbi, Halakhist and ethicist
- Yisrael Meir Lau (born 1937), the Chief Rabbi of Tel Aviv, Israel
- Yitzchak Meir Alter (1799–1866), Polish rabbi and founder of the Ger (Hasidic dynasty) within Hasidic Judaism

Surname:

- Elchanan Meir (1936–2014), Israeli psychologist
- Eric Van Meir (born 1968), Belgian football manager
- Gideon Meir (1947–2021), Israeli diplomat
- Golda Meir (1898–1978), a founder of the modern State of Israel, Hebraicized from Meyerson
- Irit Meir (1957–2018), Israeli linguist
- Jessica Meir (born 1977), comparative physiology researcher, astronaut, and aquanaut
- Nati Meir (born 1955), Romanian politician
- Rami Meir (1962–2023), Soviet-born Israeli artist
- Yaakov Meir (1856–1939), Orthodox rabbi
- Yigal Meir (born 1957), Israeli theoretical physicist

Localities

- Meir, Antwerp, shopping street in Antwerp, Belgium
- Meir, Egypt
- Meir, Staffordshire

== See also ==
- Meyr (disambiguation)
- Meyer (disambiguation)
- Myer (disambiguation)
- Mayer (disambiguation)
