= Meyer (name) =

Meyer is a masculine given name. Notable people with the name include:

- Meyer (footballer), Meyer Carlos de Camargo, Júnior (born 1980), Brazilian football player
- Meyer Alterman (1891–1967), New York assemblyman
- Meyer R. Bimberg (died 1908), American businessman
- Meyer Cardin (1907–2005), American jurist and politician
- Meyer Cohen, known as Mickey Cohen (1913–1976), American gangster, boxer and entrepreneur
- Meyer Dolinsky (1923–1984), American screenwriter
- Meyer Fortes (1906–1983), South African-born anthropologist
- Meyer Fürth, German teacher and writer
- Meyer Guggenheim (1828–1905), American businessman
- Meyer Habib (born 1961), Tunisian-Jewish French-Israeli politician
- Meyer Justin Herman (1909–1971), American public administrator, active in San Francisco
- Meyer Lansky (1902–1983), American gangster
- Meyer Levin (1905–1981), American novelist
- Meyer Levin (military) (1916–1943), American aviator
- Meyer London (1871–1926), American politician
- Meyer Lutz (1829–1903), German-born British composer and conductor
- Meyer Francis Nimkoff (1904–1965), American sociologist
- Meyer Rosenbaum (I) (1852–1908), Kretchnifer Rebbe
- Meyer Rosenbaum (II) (1910–death year unknown), self-proclaimed Chief Rabbi of Cuba
- Meyer Rubin (1924–2020), American geologist
- Meyer Schapiro (1904–1996), Lithuanian-born American art historian
- Meyer Shapiro, multiple people
- Meyer Wolf Weisgal (1894–1977), American journalist, publisher, and playwright
- Meyer Wolfe (1897–1985), American sculptor.
- Meyer Zayder (died 1930), Soviet military figure

== Fictional characters ==
- Meyer Wolfsheim, from The Great Gatsby by F. Scott Fitzgerald
- Meyer Meyer, from the 87th Precinct series by Ed McBain
- Meyer Landsman, from The Yiddish Policemen's Union by Michael Chabon

== See also ==
- Meyer (surname), list of people with the surname version
- Meyer, disambiguation pager
