= Joseph Mayer =

Joseph Mayer may refer to:

- Joseph Mayer (antiquary) (1803–1886), English goldsmith, antiquary and collector
- Joseph Edward Mayer (1904–1983), American chemist
- Joseph Mayer (cricketer) (1902–1981), English first-class cricketer who played with Warwickshire
- Joseph Mayer (politician) (1877–1942), American Republican Party politician
- Joseph L. Mayer (c. 1875–1933), American chemist
- Joe Mayer (1846–1909), American businessman and gold prospector

== See also ==
- Joseph Meyer (disambiguation)
- Joe Meyers (disambiguation)
- Josef Mayr (1900-1957), mayor of Augsburg, Germany
