= Von Meyer =

Meyer is a German surname, often but not always used with the Nobiliary particle "von" (of). Notable people sharing this surname include:

- Carl Anton von Meyer (1795-1855), Russian botanist and explorer
- Christian Erich Hermann von Meyer (1801–1869), German palaeontologist, see m:de:Hermann von Meyer
- Gustav Ritter von Meyer (1834-1909), Bavarian politician, see m:de:Gustav Ritter von Meyer
- Johann Friedrich von Meyer (1772–1849), German translator, politician and senator

== See also ==
- Meyer (disambiguation)
- Meyer (surname)
- Myer (disambiguation)
- Meyr (disambiguation)
- Meier (disambiguation)
- Meir (disambiguation)
- Mayer (disambiguation)
- Maier
- Mayr
- Mair (disambiguation)
- Meyers
- Myers
