= Paul Meyer =

Paul Meyer may refer to:

- Paul Meyer (clarinetist) (born 1965), French clarinetist
- Paul Meyer (philologist) (1840–1917), French philologist
- Paul Meyer (rower) (born 1922), Swiss rower
- Paul Meyer (sport shooter) (born 1961), Zimbabwean sports shooter
- Sgt. Paul Meyer, aircraft mechanic who stole a Lockheed C-130 in 1969

== See also ==
- Paul Mayer (disambiguation)
- Paul Meyers (disambiguation)
- Paul Meier (disambiguation)
