= Joseph Meyer =

Joseph Meyer may refer to:

== Sports ==
- Joseph Meyer (rower), Swiss Olympic medalist
- Joseph A. Meyer (c. 1895–1970), American football and basketball coach
- Joe Meyer (equestrian) (born 1970), New Zealand equestrian
- Joey Meyer (basketball) (1949–2023), American basketball coach for DePaul
- Joey Meyer (baseball) (born 1962), American former MLB player

== Others ==
- Joseph Meyer (publisher) (1796–1856), German publisher
- Joseph Meyer (songwriter) (1894–1987), American songwriter
- Joseph Meyer (Wyoming politician) (1941–2012), American politician
- Joseph U. Meyer (born 1948), American politician from Kentucky
- Joseph E. Meyer (1878–1950), American botanist
- Joseph Meyer, publisher of the New York Observer

== See also ==
- Joseph Mayer (disambiguation)
- Joe Meyers (disambiguation)
- Josef Mayr (1900–1957), German mayor of Augsburg
