= Bentall Centre =

Bentall Centre may refer to:

- Bentall Centre, Kingston, a shopping centre in Kingston upon Thames, London, England
- Bentall Centre, Vancouver, the collective name for five office towers, plus the basement mall, located in Vancouver, British Columbia, Canada
