= Trace (name) =

Trace is the name of:

== Given name or nickname ==
- Trace Adkins (born 1962), American country singer, songwriter, and actor
- Trace Armstrong (born 1965), American former American football defensive end
- Trace Balla, Australian children's writer and illustrator
- Trace Beaulieu (born 1958), American puppeteer, writer, and actor
- Trace Bright (born 2000), American baseball player
- Trace Bundy, instrumental acoustic guitar player who lives and performs in Boulder, Colorado
- Trace Coquillette (born 1974), retired Major League Baseball third baseman and second baseman
- Trace Cyrus (born 1989), American musician, brother of Miley and a member of Metro Station
- Trace DeMeyer (born 1956), multi-genre author, artist, poet and journalist of Shawnee-Cherokee descent
- Trace Gallagher (born 1961), American journalist and television news anchor for Fox News Channel
- Trace Lysette, American actress
- Trace McSorley (born 1995), American football quarterback

== Surname ==
- Al Trace (1900–1993), American songwriter and orchestra leader
- Arther Trace (1926–2005), American author, critic and educational reformer
- Arthur Trace (born 1979), American magician
- Ben Trace (1890–1976), American songwriter
- Christopher Trace (1933–1992), English actor and television presenter
- Kaleigh Trace (born 1986), Canadian writer and sex educator

== See also ==
- Trayce, given name
