= Paul Meijer =

Paul Meijer may refer to:

- Paul Meijer (racing driver)
- Paul Meijer (politician)

== See also ==
- Paul Meier (disambiguation)
