= Paul Mayer =

Paul Mayer may refer to:

- Paul Mayer (activist) (1931–2013), American peace activist
- Paul Mayer (zoologist) (1848–1923), German zoologist known for study of marine life
- Paul Augustin Mayer (1911–2010), German cardinal of the Roman Catholic Church
- Paul Avila Mayer (1928–2009), American television writer and producer

== See also ==
- Paul Meyer (disambiguation)
- Paul Meier (disambiguation)
