= Ryan D. Duffy =

American Psychology Professor

Ryan Duffy is an American professor of Psychology at the University of Florida.

He is recognized for his contributions to the field of vocational psychology, namely via his development of the Psychology of Working Theory (PWT) and Work as a Calling Theory (WCT). His research specializes in the ways personal, structural, and economic barriers impact career choice along with how positive psychology principles influence career as a calling.

He is the Editor-in-Chief of the Journal of Vocational Behavior.

== Education and career ==
Duffy received his B.A. from Boston College in 2004 and his M.A. in 2006 from the University of Maryland, where he also earned his Ph.D. in 2009. He has been a professor of psychology at the University of Florida since 2009.

Duffy was an Editor for the Journal of Career Assessment until 2022 when he became Editor-in-Chief for the Journal of Vocational Behavior.

== Selected publications ==
- Duffy, R.D., Autin, K.L., Allan, B.A.., & Douglass, R.P. (2015). Assessing work as a calling: An evaluation of instruments and practice recommendations. Journal of Career Assessment, 23, 351-366. doi:10.1177/1069072714547163
- Duffy, R.D., Jadidian, A., Douglass, R.P., Allan, B.A. (2015). Work volition among United States Veterans: Locus of control as a mediator. The Counseling Psychologist, 43, 853-878. doi:10.1177/001100001557680
- Duffy, R.D., Douglass, R.P., & Autin, K.L. (2015). Career adaptability and academic satisfaction: Examining work volition and self-efficacy as mediators. Journal of Vocational Behavior, 90, 46-54. doi:10.1016/j.jvb.2015.07.007
- Duffy, R. D., Blustein, D. L., Diemer, M. A., & Autin, K. L. (2016). The Psychology of Working Theory. Journal of Counseling Psychology, 63(2), 127–148. https://doi.org/10.1037/cou0000140
- Duffy, R. D., Dik, B. J., Douglass, R. P., England, J. W., & Velez, B. L. (2018). Work as a calling: A theoretical model. Journal of Counseling Psychology, 65(4), 423–439. https://doi.org/10.1037/cou0000276
- Duffy, R.D., Kim, H.J., Perez, G., Prieto, C.G., Torgal, C., Kenny, M.E. (2022). Decent education as a precursor to decent work: An overview and construct conceptualization. Journal of Vocational Behavior, 138, 103771.doi:10.1016/j.jvb.2022.103771
- Duffy, R.D., Kim, H.J., Allan, B.A., *Prieto, C.G., & Perez, G. (2022). Structural predictors of underemployment during COVID-19 pandemic: A Psychology of Working perspective. The Counseling Psychologist, 50, 477-505. doi:10.1177/00110000221078819
- Duffy, R.D., Kim, H.J., Boren, S., Pendleton, L.H., & Perez, G. (2023). Lifetime experiences of economic constraints and marginalization among incoming college students: A latent profile analysis.Journal of Diversity in Higher Education, 16, 384-396. doi:10.1037/dhe0000344
- Duffy, R.D., Choi, Y., Kim, H.J., & Park, J. (2024). Recommendations for conceptualizing and measuring constructs within Psychology of Working Theory. Journal of Career Assessment, 32, 48-62. doi:10.1177/10690727231179196

== Honors and awards ==
In 2017 Duffy was a recipient of the Fritz and Linn Kuder Early Career Award for Distinguished Scientific Contributions from the American Psychological Association's 17th Division of Counseling Psychology Duffy was also named a fellow of the American Psychological Association in 2018. He was the 2020 winner of the John Holland Award for Outstanding Achievement in Career or Personality Research from the American Psychological Association's 17th Division of Counseling Psychology.
