= De Meyer =

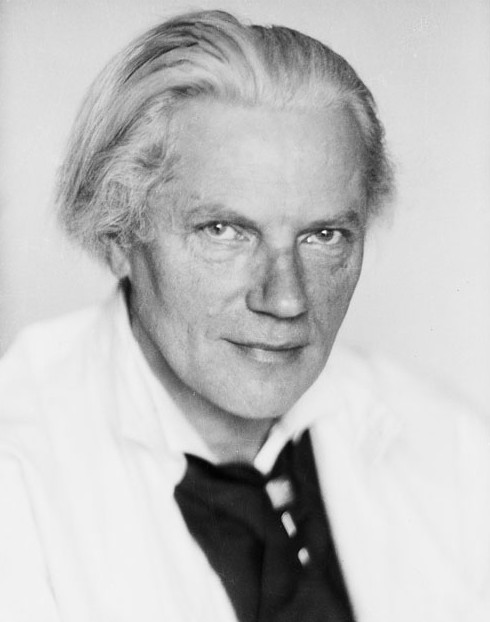

De Meyer, DeMeyer, Demeyer, De Meijer or De Meijere is a Dutch occupational surname related to English Mayor. It is particularly common in Flanders. People with this surname include:

De Meijer

- Hendrick de Meijer ((1620–1689), Dutch landscape painter
- Hendrik de Meijer (1744–1793), Dutch painter
- José de Meijer (1915–2000), Dutch politician
- Sadiqa de Meijer (born 1977), Canadian poet

De Meijere

- Johannes C. H. de Meijere (1866–1947), Dutch zoologist and entomologist

De Meyer

- Adolph de Meyer (1868–1946), portrait and fashion photographer and art collector
- Arnoud De Meyer, Belgian management scholar
- Ingrid De Meyer, New Zealand footballer
- Jan de Meyer (1921–2014), Belgian jurist
- Jean-Luc De Meyer (born 1957), Belgian vocalist and lyricist
- Leon De Meyer (1928–2006), Belgian archeologist and Assyriologist
- Luis de Meyer (1903–?), Argentine cyclist
- Olga de Meyer (1871–1930), British-born artists' model, socialite, arts patron and writer
- Patrick De Meyer, Belgian songwriter, composer and producer

De Meyere

- Leon De Meyere (died 1630), Flemish poet

DeMeyer

- Brigitte DeMeyer (born ca. 1965), American singer-songwriter
- Nicholaes DeMeyer (1635–1691), 9th Mayor of New York City
- Trace DeMeyer (born 1956), Shawnee-Cherokee author, artist, poet and journalist

Demeyer

- Marc Demeyer (1950–1982), Belgian road racing cyclist
- Willy Demeyer (1959-), Belgian politician

== See also ==
- Meijer (surname)
- Meyer (surname)
