= Mayers =

Mayers is a surname. Notable people with the surname include:

- Alan Mayers (born 1937), British footballer
- Anastatia Mayers (born circa 2005), Antiguan space traveller, first Caribbean woman in space, first mother-daughter pair in space, via an August 2023 Virgin Galactic suborbital tourist spaceflight
- Antonio Mayers (born 1979), Barbadian cricketer
- Emanuel Mayers (born 1989), Trinidadian hurdler
- George Mayers (1860–1952), Irish Anglican priest
- Howard Mayers (1910–1942), Australian flying ace
- Jamal Mayers (born 1974), Canadian ice hockey player
- John Mayers (cricketer) (1801–1865), British cricketer
- Kyle Mayers (born 1992), Barbadian cricketer
- Mike Mayers (born 1991), American baseball player
- Naomi Mayers, Australian indigenous rights activist and singer
- Natasha Mayers (born 1979), Saint Vincent and the Grenadines sprinter
- Rakim Mayers, known as ASAP Rocky (born 1988), American rapper, music producer and record executive
- Raymond Mayers (born 1960), Australian water polo player
- Sharne Mayers (born 1992), Zimbabwean cricketer
- Vincent Mayers (1934–2013), Guyanese cricketer

== See also ==
- Mayers' Industrial School
- Mayer (disambiguation)
- Meyers (disambiguation)
