= Meijers =

Meijers is a Dutch occupational surname related to English Mayor. People with this surname include:

- Aaron Meijers (born 1987), Dutch footballer
- Bart Meijers (born 1997), Dutch footballer
- Debora Meijers (born 1948), Dutch art historian
- Eduard Meijers (1880–1954), Dutch jurist and founding father of the current Dutch civil code
- Ellen Meijers, Dutch video game music composer
- Eric Meijers (born 1963), Dutch football manager
- nl:Harie Meijers (1879–1928), Dutch track cyclist
- Jeroen Meijers (born 1993), Dutch cyclist
- Pauke Meijers (1934–2013), Dutch footballer
- Viesturs Meijers (1967–2024), Latvian chess player

== See also ==
- Meijer, Dutch surname
- Meijer, American hypermarket chain
- Meyers, English, Dutch, or German surname
