= Jean Lemaire =

Jean Lemaire may refer to:

- Jean Lemaire de Belges (1473–1524), Walloon expressionist poet
- Jean Lemaire (painter), known as Lemaire-Poussin (1601(?)–1659), French painter
- Jean Lemaire (lawyer) (1904–1986), lawyer to Philippe Pétain

== See also ==
- Lemaire (surname)
