= Harting (disambiguation) =

Harting is a parish in the English county of West Sussex.

Harting may also refer to:

- Harting (UK electoral ward), of Chichester District, West Sussex, England

== Surname ==
- Hans Harting (1926—2004), Dutch athlete
- J. Harting, Indonesian football defender who played for the Dutch East Indies
- James Edmund Harting, English ornithologist
- Jumbo Harting (1865—1947), American baseball player
- Pieter Harting (1812—85), Dutch biologist
- Robert Harting (born 1984), German discus thrower

== See also ==
- Mayr-Harting
- Jeff Hartings (born 1972), American college and professional football player
