= Florian Maier (disambiguation) =

Florian Maier (born 1992) is an Austrian footballer.

Florian Maier may also refer to:

- Florian Maier (politician) (born 1985), German politician
- Florian Maier-Aichen (born 1973), German photographer
- Florian Magnus Maier (born 1973), Dutch composer and guitarist
