= Eric Meyer =

Eric Meyer may refer to:

- Eric Meyer (musician) (born 1966), former Dark Angel guitarist
- Eric Meyer (politician) (born 1961), member of the Arizona House of Representatives
- Eric A. Meyer, American web design consultant and author
- Eric K. Meyer (born 1953), University of Illinois journalism professor

== See also ==
- Eric Meyers (disambiguation)
