= Judge Myers =

Judge Myers may refer to:

- Francis Kerschner Myers (1874–1940), judge of the United States District Court for the Eastern District of South Carolina
- Richard E. Myers II (born 1967), judge of the United States District Court for the Eastern District of North Carolina

== See also ==
- Justice Myers (disambiguation)
