= Thomas Meier =

Thomas Meier may refer to:

- Thomas D. Meier, Swiss historian
- Tom Meier, sculptor
