= Elchanan Meir =

Israeli psychologist

- אלחנן מאיר
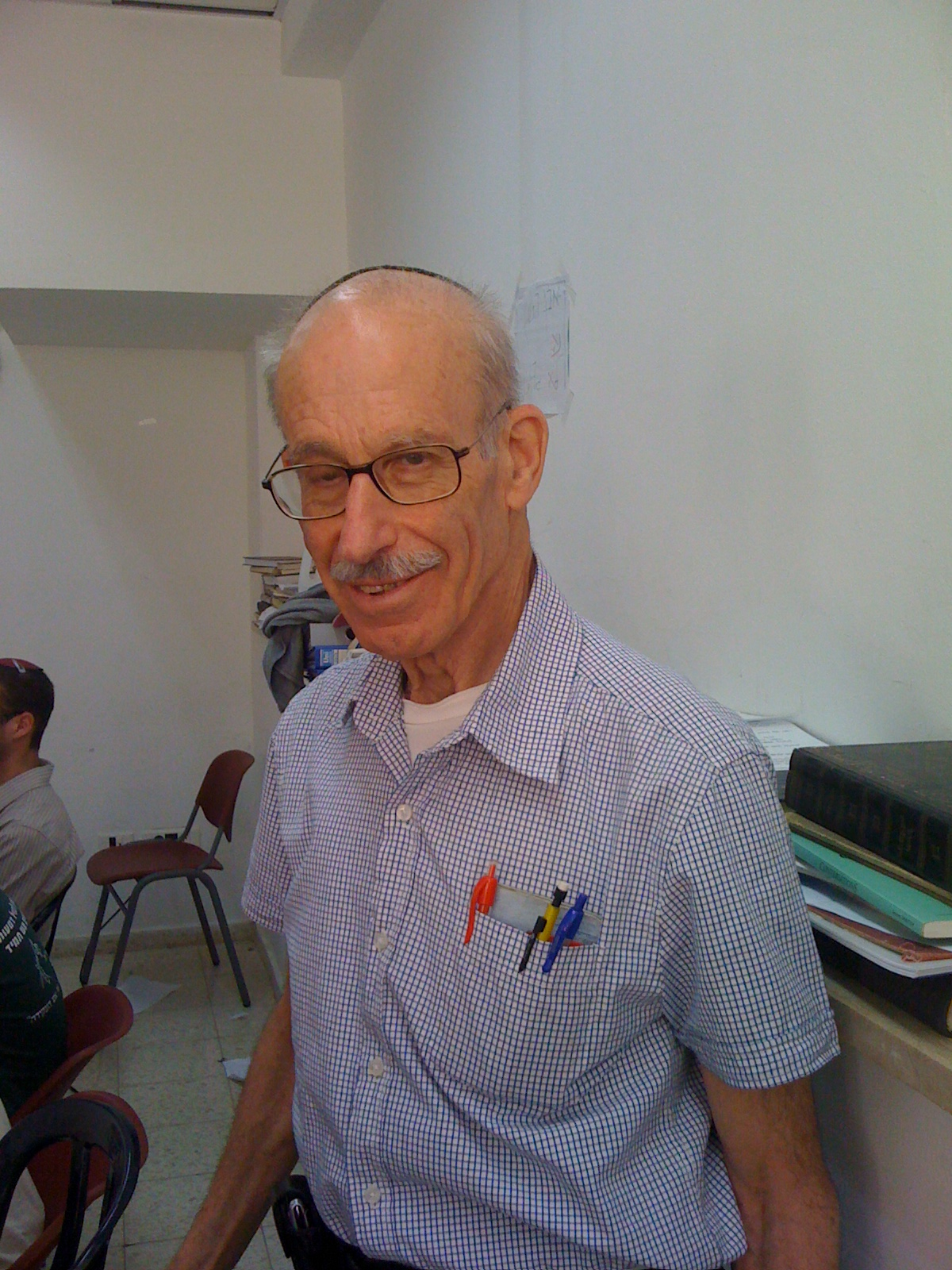
- Born: July 10, 1936; Jerusalem, Mandatory Palestine
- Died: February 17, 2014 (aged 77); Otniel, Israel

Professor Elchanan Israel Meir (Hebrew: אלחנן ישראל מאיר; 10 July 1936 – 17 February 2014) was an Israeli psychologist who was a professor in the Department of Psychological at the Tel Aviv University. He was the president of the Israeli Psychology Association for 10 years and chairman of the Council of Psychology in Israel for 6 years.

== Biography ==
Elhanan I. Meir was born on 1936 in Jerusalem. After his army service in the IDF, he studied at the Hebrew University of Jerusalem (B.A. in psychology, statistics, sociology; M.A. in psychology). He received his Ph.D. at the University of Amsterdam, Netherlands (1968).

Meir's specialty was vocational and counseling psychology. Most of his articles were published in the Journal of Vocational Behavior and in the Journal of Career Assessment. Meir also was the head of the research unit of the Hadassah Vocational Counseling Institute.

After 39 years at the Tel Aviv University, Meir retired as a full professor.

In 2002, at the age of 66, Meir started to study at the Yeshivat Otniel.

On February 17, 2014, Meir died after a long battle with cancer.

== Publications ==
Among Meir's publications and the books "Statistics for the Behavioral Sciences" (16 editions, in Hebrew),"Shabath Vayinafash" (five books on the Torah, in Hebrew), and "Minor Personalities in the book of Bereshit: Psychological insights".

In 2007, The Journal of Vocational Behavior ranked Meir as first among authors of articles during the previous 34 years.
