= Mayr-Harting =

Mayr-Harting is a surname. Notable people with the surname include:

- Henry Mayr-Harting (born 1936), Regius Professor of Ecclesiastical History at the University of Oxford
- Robert Mayr-Harting (1874–1948), Austrian-born Czechoslovak politician
- Thomas Mayr-Harting (born 1954), English-born Austrian diplomat

== See also ==
- Mayr
- Harting (disambiguation)
