= Meyer =

Meyer may refer to:

== People ==
- Meyer (surname), listing people so named
- Meyer (name), a list of people and fictional characters with the name

== Companies ==
- Meyer Burger, a Swiss mechanical engineering company
- Meyer Corporation
- Meyer Sound Laboratories
- Meyer Turku, a Finnish shipbuilding company
- Behn Meyer, a German chemical company
- Fred Meyer, an American hypermarket chain and subsidiary of Kroger
- Fred Meyer Jewelers

== Places ==
=== United States ===
- Meyer, Illinois, an unincorporated community in Adams County, Illinois
- Meyer, Franklin County, Illinois, an unincorporated community in Franklin County, Illinois
- Meyer, Iowa, in Mitchell County, Iowa
- Myers, Montana (also spelled Meyer), an unincorporated community in Treasure County
- Meyer Township, Michigan

== Other ==
- Meyer House (disambiguation), multiple buildings in the U.S.
- Meyer locomotive
- Meyer Theatre, an historic theater in Wisconsin, U.S.
- USS Meyer (DD-279), a Clemson-class destroyer in the United States Navy

== See also ==
- Justice Meyer (disambiguation)
- Von Meyer
- Myer (disambiguation)
- Meyr (disambiguation)
- Meier (disambiguation)
- Meijer (surname)
- Meir (disambiguation)
- Mair (disambiguation)
- Mayer (disambiguation)
- Maier
- Mayr
- Meyers
- Myers
