= Johannes Meier =

Johannes Meier may refer to:

- Johannes Meier (footballer) (born 1984), German footballer
- Johannes Meyer (Estonian politician) (1858–1945), Estonian politician
- Johannes Meier (German politician) (born 1989), German politician
