= MARK Capital Management =

Real estate investment management firm

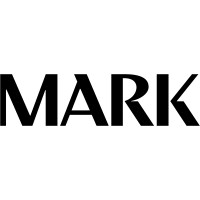
- Type: Privately held company
- Industry: Real estate
- Founded: 2004; 22 years ago
- Founders: Ton Meijer, Markus Meijer
- Headquarters: London, United Kingdom
- AUM: €7 billion (2021)
- Website: thisismark.com

MARK Capital Management (previously Meyer Bergman) is a British real estate investment management firm. As of 2021, it had more than €7 billion in assets under management. MARK Capital Management was formed in 2004 by its chairman, Ton Meijer, and its chief executive officer, Markus Meijer from the holdings of the former MAB Group.

MARK's strategies run parallel to its closed-ended value-add funds, focusing on mixed-use real estate throughout Europe and the United States. The strategies aim to repurpose and reposition under-utilised assets in urban gateway locations throughout Europe.

== History ==
The company was established in 2004 as Meyer Bergman.

In 2012, it was reported that the company owned London's Burlington Arcade, The Bentall Centre in Kingston upon Thames, and Exchange Ilford in Ilford, Essex.

The firm was one of the principals behind the 2013 acquisition of large parts of the Queensway district of west London with a view to the redevelopment of the area. The purchases include the Queensway Estate, location of the ice skating rink and Queensway Market, and the Whiteleys shopping centre which was purchased from Standard Life Investments.

In June 2015, it was announced that the company would partner with London property businessman Warren Todd to redevelop Whiteleys in a mixed used scheme that would include housing, leisure facilities and retail premises to be designed by Foster & Partners.

In October 2015, it was announced that the company would be buying over a dozen of Tesco's 49 mothballed sites in a £250m deal, and that "some 10,000 homes could be built on the sites in London, the South East and Bath".

In October 2015, Meyer Bergman rebranded as MARK Capital Management, and began to include life sciences and digital real estate opportunities.

In 2016, MARK acquired Borough Yards, situated in the London Borough of Southwark next to Borough Market. Borough Yards includes workspace, retail, gallery, restaurants, and a cinema.

== Funds ==
MARK advises four closed-ended, value-add real estate funds, the VIA Outlet Venture, and co-investments totalling more than €7 billion in assets under management on behalf of global institutional investors, which include leading pension funds, endowments and asset managers from Europe, North America, the Middle East, and Asia.
