= Mair =

Mair may refer to:

== People ==
- Mair (surname)
- the Mers people or Mairs, an ethnic group in Western India
- Welsh given name (pronounced [mair]) meaning Mary

== Other uses ==
- Mair, Egypt
- MAIR Holdings, an airline holding company based in Minnesota, United States

== See also ==
- Maier, surname
- Meir, name
- Mayer, disambiguation page
- Le Maire, surname
