= Dominic Meier =

Dominic Meier may refer to:

- Dominic Meier (ice hockey) (born 1976), Swiss ice hockey defenceman
- Dominic Meier (marksman) (born 1969), Swiss sport shooter
