= Trayce =

Trayce is a given name. Notable people with the name include:

- Trayce Jackson-Davis (born 2000), American basketball player
- Trayce Thompson (born 1991), American baseball player

== See also ==
- Trace (name), given name and surname
