= Ron Meyer (disambiguation) =

Ron Meyer (1941–2017) was an American NFL- and college football coach.

Ron Meyer may also refer to:

- Ron Meyer (politician) (born 1981), Dutch politician and former trade unionist
- Ron Meyer (quarterback) (1944–2018), American NFL player
- Ronald Meyer (born 1944), American entertainment executive and former talent agent

== See also ==
- Ron Meyers
