= Joe Meyers =

Joe or Joseph Meyers may refer to:

- Joe Meyers (American football) (1871–1959), American college football coach
- Joseph Meyers (1860–?), American politician and stonecutter
- Joe Meyers (tennis), American professional tennis player

== See also ==
- Joel Meyers, American sportscaster
- Joel Myers, founder of AccuWeather
- Joseph Meyer (disambiguation)
- Joseph Mayer (disambiguation)
