= Meyer Francis Nimkoff =

American sociologist (1904–1965)

- Born: 1904
- Died: 1965 (aged 60–61)
- Education: Boston University
- Scientific career
- Fields: sociology
- Institutions: Boston University

Meyer Francis Nimkoff (1904–1965) was an American sociologist and professor at Boston University. He was the editor of Journal of Marriage and Family Living (now the Journal of Marriage and Family).

== Books ==
- The Family, 1934
- The Child, 1934
- Parent-Child Relationships, 1935
- Marriage and the Family, 1947
- Comparative family systems, 1965
- Sociology, 1940 (published as A handbook of sociology in 1947)
- Technology and the changing family, 1955
- Technology and Social Change, 1957
