= Josh Meyers =

Josh Meyers or Josh Myers may refer to:

- Josh Meyers (actor) (born 1976), American actor and comedian
- Josh Meyers (ice hockey), (born 1985), American professional ice hockey player
- Josh Myers (actor) (born 1986), British actor
- Josh Myers (American football) (born 1998), American football center for the New York Jets
