= Jan De Meyer =

Belgian judge and politician

Jan De Meyer (21 February 1921 – 15 February 2014) was a Belgian jurist, a judge on the European Court of Human Rights (appointed in 1986), and a member of the Belgian Senate (1980–1981).

He was born in Mechelen.

He became a doctor of laws at the University of Louvain in 1942, and started practising as a barrister in Mechelen from 1944. He became a lecturer at the University of Louvain in 1951 and was professor of law from 1956 to 1986. He also served as an assessor on the Council of State from 1962 to 1980. He was an adviser to the Minister for Cultural Affairs from 1958 to 1959, adviser to the Prime Minister from 1959 to 1960, adviser to the Minister for the Civil Service from 1960 to 1961, adviser to the Minister for the Interior and the Civil Service from 1961 to 1965, and adviser to the Minister of Justice from 1965 to 1968.

He also served as Belgian member of the Council of Europe Committee of Experts on Human Rights from 1967 to 1973, and as Belgian Government agent at the European Commission of Human Rights and the European Court of Human Rights from 1967 to 1972.

He was a lecturer at the College of Europe in Bruges from 1958 to 1970.

As a senator (1980–1981) he took an active part in debates about the reshaping of the Belgian state.
