= Caitlin Mair =

Australian cricketer

Personal information
- Full name: Caitlin E Mair
- Born: 5 May 2003 (age 23)
- Batting: Right-handed
- Role: Wicket-keeper

Domestic team information
- Years: Team
- 2021/22–2022/23: Queensland

Career statistics
Competition	WLA
Matches	14
Runs scored	91
Batting average	22.75
100s/50s	0/0
Top score	20*
Catches/stumpings	23/7
- Source: CricketArchive, 2 March 2023

Caitlin E Mair (born 5 May 2003) is an Australian cricketer who plays as a right-handed batter and wicket-keeper. She last played for Queensland in the Women's National Cricket League (WNCL).

== Domestic career ==
Mair plays grade cricket for Sandgate-Redcliffe District Cricket Club. She made her debut for Queensland against South Australia in the WNCL on 6 March 2022, taking two catches. She went on to play six matches overall in the tournament, taking 12 catches and making 4 stumpings, as well as scoring 41 runs. She played eight matches for the side in the 2022–23 Women's National Cricket League season, scoring 50 runs and making 14 dismissals.
