= Meier =

Meier may refer to:

== Places ==
- Meiers Corners, a neighborhood in Staten Island, New York City, New York, United States
- Méier, a neighbourhood in Rio de Janeiro, Brazil

== Other uses ==
- A historical kind of bailiff in parts of the Low Countries
- Sid Meier's Alien Crossfire, a computer game
- Sid Meier's Alpha Centauri, a computer game
- Sid Meier's Gettysburg, a computer game
- Sid Meier's Pirates!, a computer game
- Sid Meier's SimGolf, a computer game
- Meier & Frank, a former department store chain
- Meier & Frank Building, a historic commercial building associated with Meier & Frank department stores

== See also ==
- Meyer (surname)
- Mayer (disambiguation)
- Mayr
- Meyr (disambiguation)
- Meyer (disambiguation)
- Meir
- Myers
- Lemaire
- Meijer (surname)
- German family name etymology
