= Myers Park =

Myers Park may refer to:

- Myers Park, Auckland, New Zealand
- Myers Park (Charlotte), a neighbourhood in Charlotte, North Carolina
- Myers Park, Collin County, Texas
