= Otto Maier =

Otto Maier may refer to:

- Otto Maier (footballer) (1877–1965), German footballer
- Otto Maier (publisher) (1852–1925), German publisher
- Otto Maier (rowing) (1887–1957), German rower
