= Debora Meijers =

Debora Meijers (born 1948) is an art historian and professor of museum studies at the University of Amsterdam, an educational elective program that she developed herself.

Meijers was born in Amsterdam. In 1990 she obtained her doctorate under Rob Scheller. She teaches and writes about the history of art collecting and curation as a science and as a facet of cultural heritage.

Meijers was elected a member of the Royal Netherlands Academy of Arts and Sciences in 2006.

== Works ==
- Klasseren als principe : hoe de k.k. Bildergalerie te Wenen getransformeerd werd in een 'zichtbare geschiedenis van de kunst' (1772-1781), 1990
- Kunst als Natur. Die Habsburger Gemäldegalerie um 1780, Milan, 1995
- Verzamelen: van rariteitenkabinet tot kunstmuseum, with Ellinoor Bergvelt and Mieke Rijnders, Heerlen, 1993 (second edition 2005)
- The Paper Museum of the Academy of Sciences in St Petersburg, c. 1725-60, with Renée Kistemaker and Natalja Kopaneva, Amsterdam, 2005
