= Wolfgang Meier =

German farmer (1878–1945)

Wolfgang Meier (8 November 1878 in Freuenornau, Obertaufkirchen - 22 February 1945 in Dachau concentration camp), was a German farmer who temporarily hid Augustin Rösch.

== Biography ==
Meier grew up on the Marx am Holz farm (Schwindkirchen) near Grüngiebing, which he also took over as a farmer. In the 1930s, he bought the castle-building property in Hofgiebing on a life annuity. With his wife Theresia Schellhammer (1879–1953), Meier had fourteen children, three of whom died in infancy. Meier was also a sacristan in Hofgiebing. Since he was considered reliable, he was asked to take in the Jesuit priest Augustin Rösch, who was hidden in Moosen Monastery, in his estate in Hofgiebing.

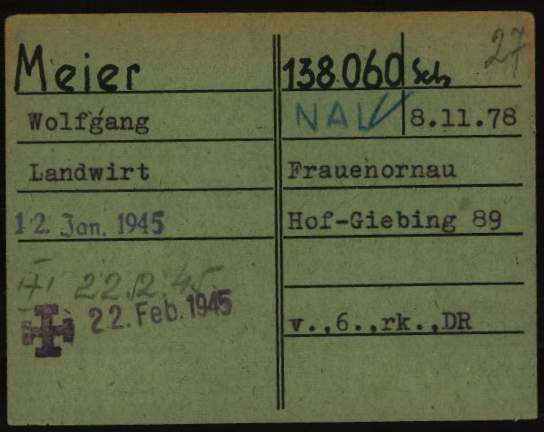
Registration card of Wolfgang Meier as a prisoner in the Nazi concentration camp Dachau

In September 1944, Rösch was taken to Hofgiebing and hidden on the first or second floor of the house, where he was hidden from neighbours and guests. However, the hiding place was betrayed to the Gestapo. Rösch, along with other clergymen, was deported to Munich and then to Berlin, while Meier – together with his children – was taken to the Dachau concentration camp. According to the official account, Meier died of typhus there on February 22, 1945. His children, on the other hand, survived their imprisonment in concentration camps.

== Honors ==
The parish hall in Schwindkirchen is called the Wolfgang-Meier-Haus in his memory. In 1999, the Catholic Church admitted Wolfgang Meier as a witness to the faith in the German Martyrology of the 20th Century.

== Literature ==
- Georg Schwaiger, Art.: Wolfgang Meier, in Helmut Moll (ed. on behalf of the German Bishops' Conference), Witnesses for Christ. The German Martyrology of the 20th Century (Paderborn et al. 1999, 7th, revised and updated edition 2019) pp. 504–507.
- Albrecht A. Gribl/ Dieter Vogel (Hg.), Das Isental, Vilsbiburg 2008.
