= Wolfgang Maier =

German psychiatrist and psychotherapist

Wolfgang Maier (born 13 January 1949) is a German psychiatrist and psychotherapist.

== Academic and professional career ==
Wolfgang Maier first studied mathematics and economics at LMU Munich, graduating with diplomas in 1973. That same year he started studying medicine, also at LMU Munich. In 1980, he received his doctorate in medicine. In 1981, he started working at the Psychiatric University Clinic Mainz, first as a clinical scientist and physician, before being promoted to a senior physician. In 1990, he qualified as a professor for the medical field of psychiatry. Concurrently, he was invited to major psychiatric research institutions for several scientific projects. (esp. Cornell Medical School in New York City and Washington University School of Medicine in St. Louis, Missouri). He is a student of the deceased American and Canadian psychiatrists Gerald Klerman and Theodore Reich and of the german Psychopharmacologists Hanns Hippius and Otto Benkert.

In 1995, he was appointed to the chair of psychiatry and psychotherapy and as the director of the Department of Psychiatry and Psychotherapy at the University of Bonn. In 2018, he was given emeritus status. Ever since he has been the medical director for Research and Education at the Gezeitenhaus Clinic in Bonn. In addition, he works as a leading psychiatrist and psychotherapist at the German Neuroscience Center since 2020.

He used to be a spokesman for the competence networks "Dementia" (since 2005) and "Degenerative Dementia" (since 2007), both promoted by the German Federal Ministry for Education and Research.

From 2012 to 2014, he was President of the German Society for Psychiatry and Psychotherapy, Psychosomatics and Neurology, Deutsche Gesellschaft für Psychiatrie und Psychotherapie, Psychosomatik und Nervenheilkunde (DGPPN). In 2004, 2013 and 2014, he was President of the DGPPN Congresses. Also, in 2000 Maier founded the World Psychiatric Association (WPA)’s section "Genetics in Psychiatry" and the European Psychiatric Association (EPA)’s section "Prevention of Mental Disorders".

From 2010 until 2020, he has been a leading editor of the authoritative German medical journal "Der Nervenarzt" (The Neurologist). Moreover, Maier served as a co-editor of the "European Archives of Psychiatry and Clinical Neuroscience". He authored, co-authored more than 1,000 scientific papers in reviewed journals. From 2011 to 2021, he was listed as a "Highly Cited Researcher" in the field Psychiatry / Psychology (web of Science)

Wolfgang Maier is a member of the National Academy of Sciences Leopoldina (neuroscience section), co-chair from 2006 to 2009. He is also a member of the Berlin-Brandenburg Academy of Sciences and Humanities (BBAW) (biomedical class) and a corresponding member of the Heidelberg Academy of Sciences and Humanities.

== Focus of work ==
Since 1985, Wolfgang Maier has been one of the initiators of genetic research on mental disorders using modern biometric and molecular methods. On the one hand, his work focuses on the study of genetic causes, manifestations and conditions for responding to the therapy of affective and schizophrenic disorders. On the other hand, he researches the risk factors, early symptoms and development of dementia and develops treatment guidelines for dementia. Since 2010, he has been a spokesman for the steering committee developing the S3 treatment guidelines "Dementia" (posted at the AWMF). He was a member (2007/08) of the Application Committee in Bonn for the founding of the German Center for Neurodegenerative Diseases (DZNE). His work now focuses on the prevention, diagnosis and treatment of severe mental and neuropsychiatric disorders.

== Other activities ==
In 2002, he founded the Fliedner Klinik, Berlin, together with Klaus Hildemann.

== Awards ==
- Hans-Jörg-Weitbrecht Prize for Clinical Neurosciences (1991)
- Kurt-Schneider Science Award (1996)
- Forensic Psychiatry (DGPPNE) h. c. (2018)

== Publications ==
- Prevention of mental Disorders (together with J. Klosterkötter), 2017. Schattauer / Thieme Medical Publishers
- Understanding Alzheimer's and Dementia. The Guidebook of the Competence Network Dementia: Diagnosis, Treatment, Everyday Life, Care (together with J. Schulz and S. Weggen), 2009, Trias Publishing House
- Author/Co-author of more than 1000 medical scientific publications in international journals.
