= Eric Meyers =

Eric Meyers may refer to:

- Eric M. Meyers, biblical scholar and archaeologist
- Eric Meyers, American voice actor in Amazing Animals, I Shouldn't Be Alive and other various works

== See also ==
- Eric Myers
- Eric Meyer (disambiguation)
