= Carole Meyers =

- Occupation: Rabbi

Carole Meyers was the first female rabbi in Southern California to lead a congregation full-time. She first became interested in becoming a rabbi after her father died when she was 13 and her stepfather died when she was 19, and the rituals and community support of the synagogue helped her through her grief. Meyers was ordained in 1983 by the Reform Jewish seminary Hebrew Union College-Jewish Institute of Religion, and spent three years as assistant rabbi of Congregation Beth Israel in Houston. She became the rabbi of Temple Sinai of Glendale in 1986, when she was 29. She resigned in 2001, and died in 2007 of bone cancer. She was married to Ralph Zarefsky and had two sons. After her death, in 2018, a book of her sermons was published, titled Leaning on God: Sermons by Rabbi Carole L. Meyers.
