= Ron Meyers =

Ron Meyers may refer to:

- Ron Meyers (potter) (born 1934), American ceramic artist
- Ron Meyers (politician) (born 1950), American politician from Washington state

== See also ==
- Ron Meyer (disambiguation)
