= Dominic Meier (ice hockey) =

Swiss ice hockey player

- Born: December 26, 1976 (age 49) Chur, Switzerland
- Height: 5 ft 10 in (178 cm)
- Weight: 190 lb (86 kg; 13 st 8 lb)
- Position: Defence
- Shot: Right
- NLA team: Retired
- Playing career: 1994–2012

Dominic Meier (born December 26, 1976) is a Swiss professional ice hockey defenceman. Retired.
