= Johann Maier (disambiguation) =

Johann Maier (1906–1945) was a German priest.

Johann Maier may also refer to:

- Johann Maier (talmudic scholar) (1933–2019), Austrian biblical scholar
- Johann Maier von Eck (1486–1543), German Catholic theologian
