= Sascha Meier =

German politician (born 1997)

Member of the Landtag of Hesse
- Incumbent
- Assumed office 18 January 2024

Personal details
- Born: 26 October 1997 (age 28)
- Party: Alliance 90/The Greens (since 2014)

Sascha Meier (born 26 October 1997) is a German politician serving as a member of the Landtag of Hesse since 2024. He is the youngest current member of the Landtag.
