= Bentall Centre, Kingston upon Thames =

Bentall Centre

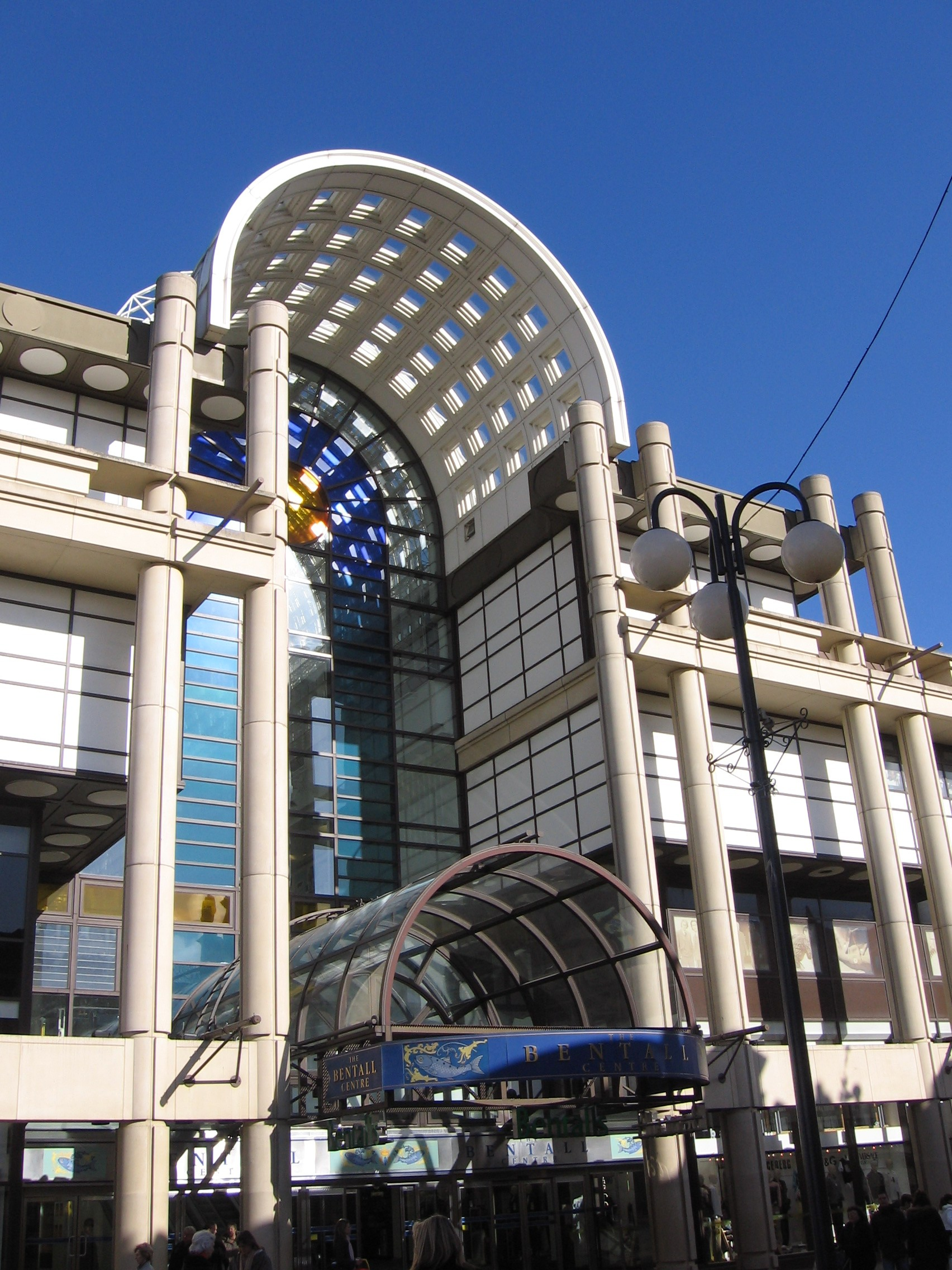
- Location: Kingston upon Thames, London, England
- Coordinates: 51.412°N 0.3046°W
- Opened: 2 November 1992
- Owner: Meyer Bergman
- Num. of stores: 75
- Num. of anchor tenants: 1 (Fenwick)
- Floor area: 600,000 sq ft (56,000 m^{2})
- Floors: 4
- Parking: 1,900 spaces
- Website: www.bentallcentre.co.uk

The Bentall Centre is a large shopping centre in Kingston upon Thames, Greater London, England, which opened in 1992. It has been built in the retail space of Bentalls department store, first established on the site in 1867. Bentalls retained a large, premium department store in the development which has since been rebranded to Fenwick. The centre is located adjacent to John Lewis Kingston, as well as the historic market town centre. There are 75 stores within the centre.

== History and development ==
In 1987, construction began on creating a new Bentalls department store and shopping centre. This new development was to include a five level department store and a four level adjoining shopping centre including over 100 retail units. A pedestrian bridge across the Kingston Relief Road allowed access to and from the multi-storey car parks to the shopping centre.

The development took five years to complete and was built in two phases, allowing the existing department store to trade throughout the development period on a reduced footprint. The first phase, the 'new' department store opened in July 1990. The completed shopping centre was opened in November 1992 by Edward Bentall (descendant of Frank Bentall) and Nick Price from Norwich Union with a floor area of 600,000 sq ft (55,742 m^{2}).

In 2012, it was reported that the centre is owned by the London-based Dutch privately held real estate investment company Meyer Bergman.

== Current operations ==
=== Stores ===
Major stores in the centre include Bentalls, Apple, Zara, H&M, Waterstones, EE, Vodafone and WHSmith.

=== Unique features ===
The shopping centre's atrium ceiling is higher than the nave of Westminster Abbey or the dome of St Paul's Cathedral. The original department store's 1935 façade designed by Maurice Webb was retained.

Another notable feature of the centre is an escalator that travels from the ground to the second floor. It is the largest single-truss escalator in the world, supported only at the top and bottom.

When opened, a statue of Leonard Bentall by William Reid Dick was placed on the top floor looking down across the whole centre. However, when Fenwick bought the department store in 2001, they moved it to a secondary location as they believed it affected the sight lines into the store.

On opening, the Bentall Centre was the first shopping centre in the UK to adopt a "no smoking" policy throughout.

== Gallery ==
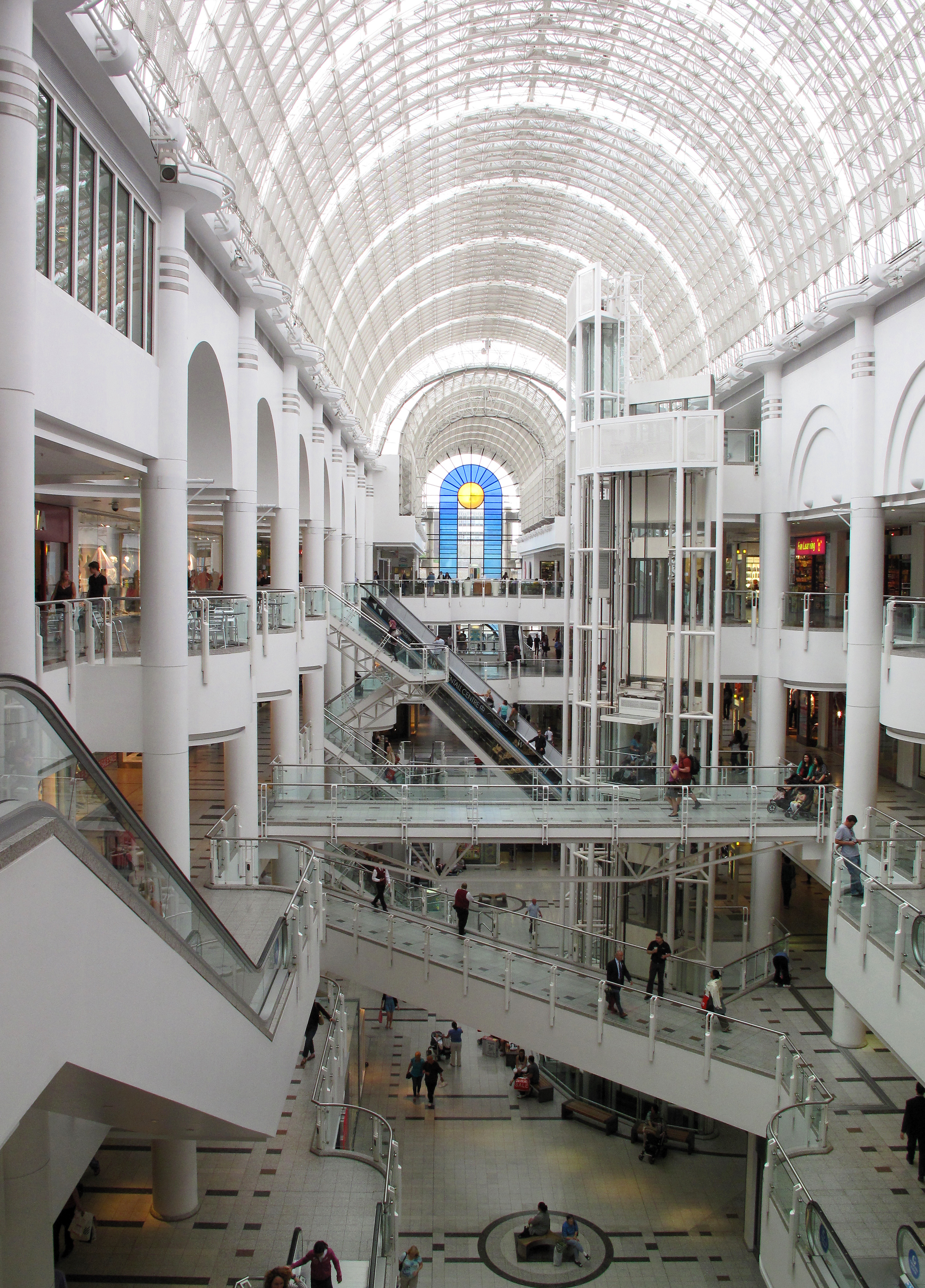
The interior of The Bentall Centre

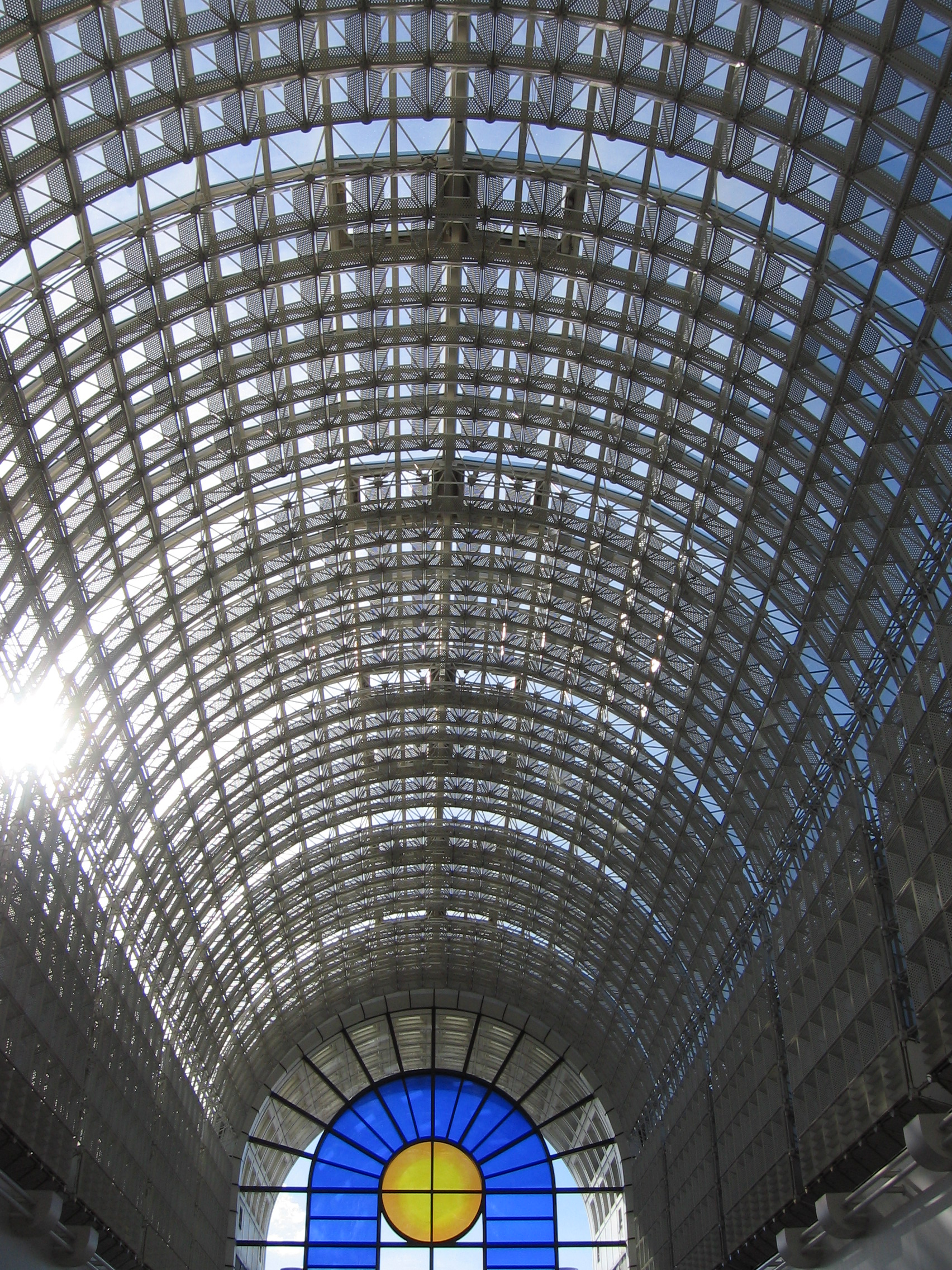
The atrium ceiling at The Bentall Centre

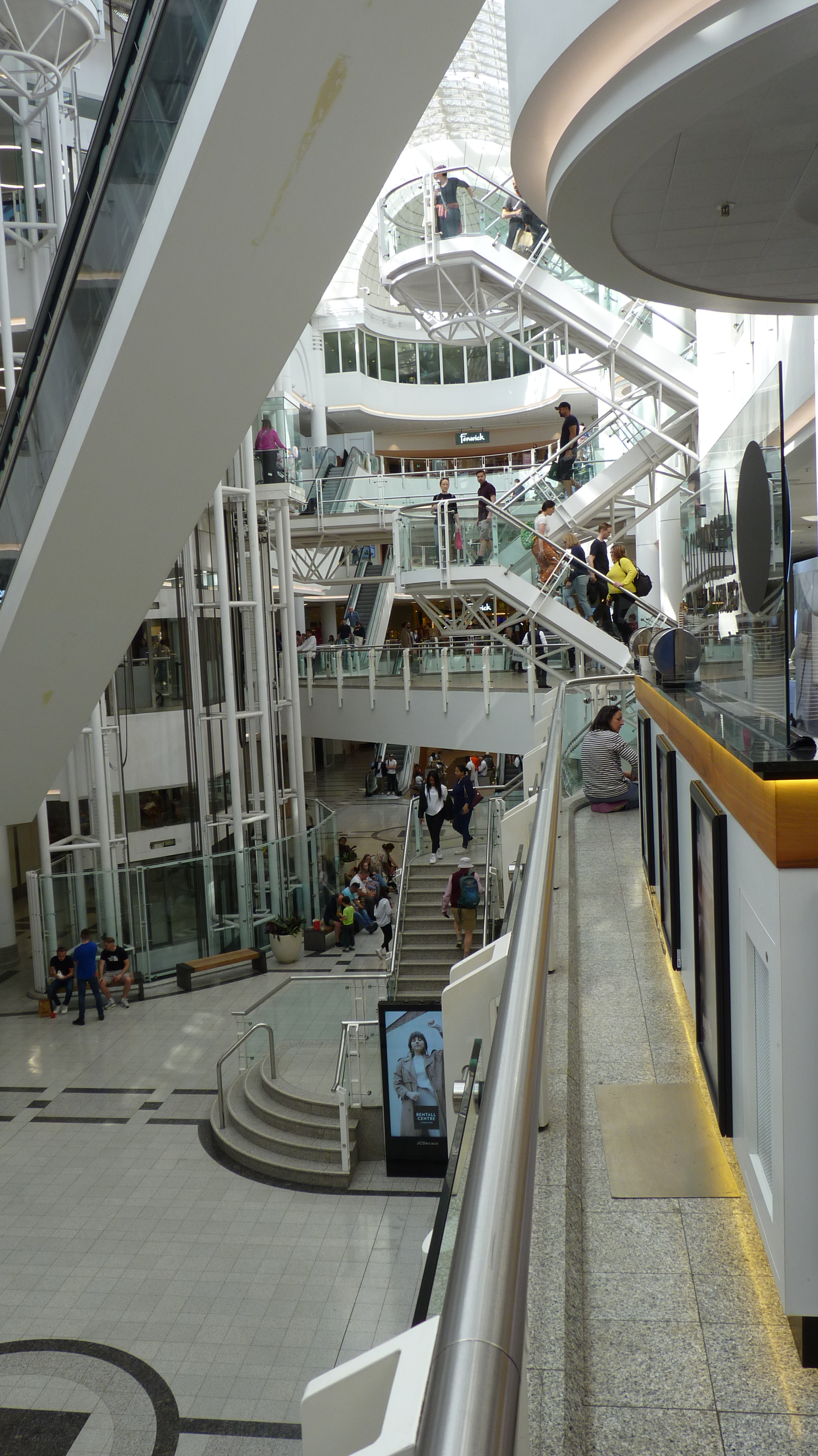
view
