= Meyer Shapiro =

Meyer Shapiro may refer to:

- Meir Shapiro, dean of Chachmei Lublin Yeshiva, and founder of the Daf Yomi Talmud folio cycle
- Meyer Shapiro, one of the Shapiro Brothers, New York City labor racketeer
- Meyer Schapiro, art historian
