= Florian Maier (politician) =

German politician (born 1985)

Member of the Landtag of Rhineland-Palatinate
- Incumbent
- Assumed office 18 May 2021
- Preceded by: Wolfgang Schwarz
- Constituency: Landau in der Pfalz

Personal details
- Born: 31 December 1985 (age 40)
- Party: Social Democratic Party (since 2005)

Florian Maier (born 31 December 1985) is a German politician serving as a member of the Landtag of Rhineland-Palatinate since 2021. He has served as mayor of Dammheim since 2014.
