= Wes Meier =

American football coach

Biographical details
- Born: c. 1968–69
- Education: University of Utah, B.S. (1991); Southern Utah University

Coaching career (HC unless noted)
- 2003: Southern Utah (Asst.)
- 2004–2007: Southern Utah

Head coaching record
- Overall: 10–33

Wes Meier (born c. 1968–69) is an American former football coach. He was the head coach of the Southern Utah Thunderbirds football team from 2004 to 2007.

== Coaching career ==
Meier served as an assistant at Southern Utah for one year in 2003 before being named head coach in January 2004 after Gary Andersen resigned to become the defensive line coach at Utah.

After four seasons, Meier had compiled a 10–33 record and was let go after the 2007 season.

== Personal life ==
Meier is now a real estate agent.

== Head coaching record ==
Year	Team	Overall	Conference	Standing	Bowl/playoffs
Southern Utah Thunderbirds (Great West Conference) (2004–2007)
2004	Southern Utah	6–5	2–2	T–4th	
2005	Southern Utah	1–9	0–4	5th	
2006	Southern Utah	1–9	0–4	5th	
2007	Southern Utah	0–11	0–0	5th	
Southern Utah:		19–33	2–10		
Total:		10–33			
