= Edward Daniel Meier =

American mechanical engineer

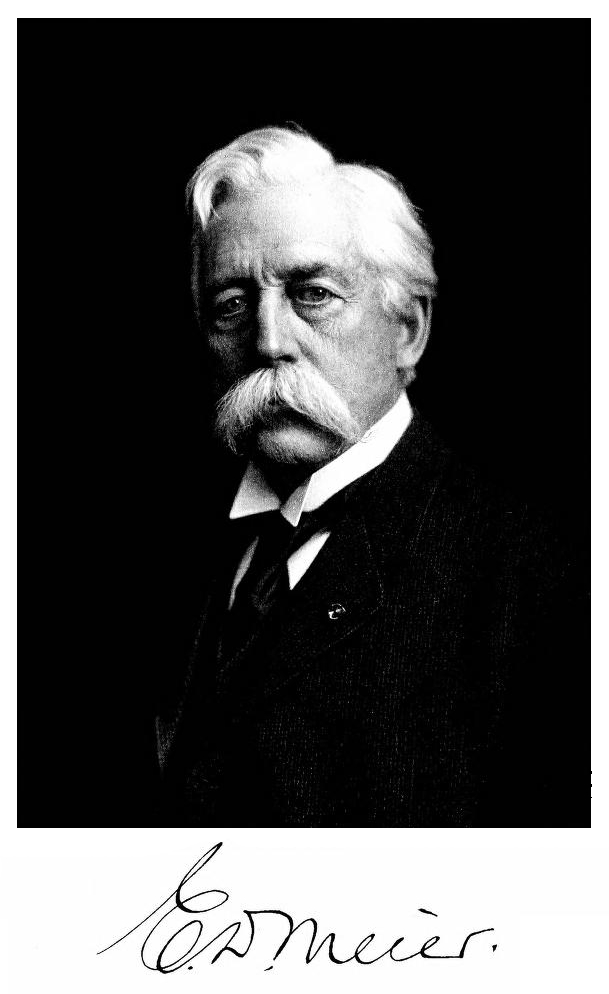
Edward Daniel Meier, 1911

Edward Daniel Meier (May 30, 1841 - December 15, 1914) was an American mechanical engineer, and President and chief engineer of the Heine Safety Boiler Company, known as president of the American Society of Mechanical Engineers in the year 1911–12.

== Biography ==
=== Youth, study and civil war ===
Meier was born in St. Louis in 1841, son of a native German hardware merchant Adolphus Meier. After attending St. Louis Public High School, he studied at Washington University in St. Louis for two years, and at the Royal Polytechnic College in Hanover for another four years.

Upon his return in the States in 1862 he started as apprentice at Mason's Locomotive Works in Taunton, Massachusetts. The next year he enlisted in the Grey Reserves, the Thirty-Second Pennsylvania, which was attached to the army of the Potomac until after the Battle of Gettysburg. He subsequently served in the Second Massachusetts Battery, also in the United States Army Corps of Engineers, and finally became lieutenant in the First Louisiana Cavalry, seeing much active service, and on May 30, 1865, receiving the surrender of Lieutenant-General John Bell Hood and staff.

=== Early career ===
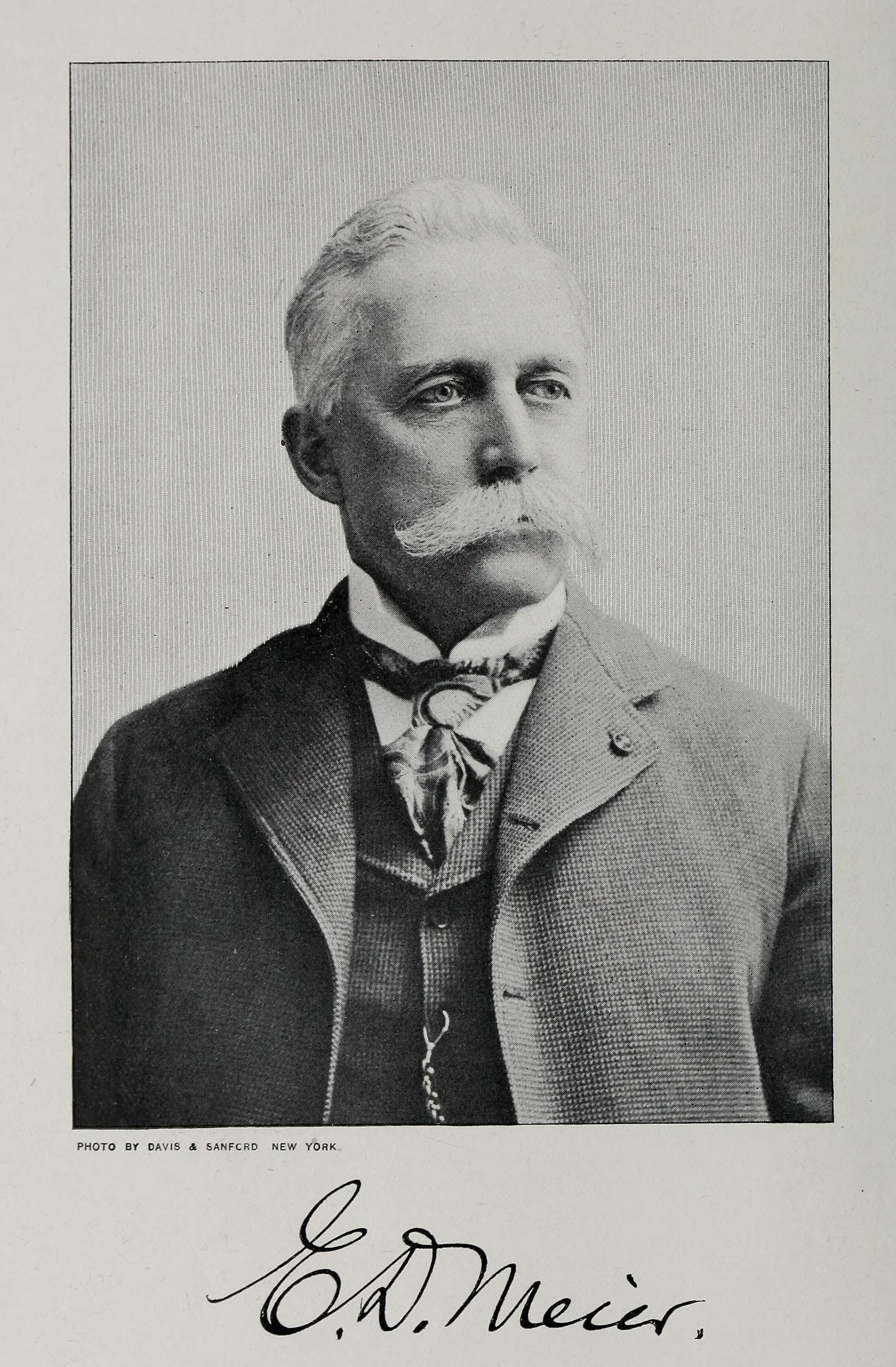
Edward Daniel Meier, c. 1900

At the war Meier was connected with Rogers Locomotive and Machine Works in Paterson, New Jersey for a year. In 1867 he joined the Kansas Pacific Railway first as assistant and later as superintendent of machinery. His work there ranged from "keeping open its Western communications when the bridges were swept away, [to] designing, building and operating a mill for sawing, planing and turning the soft magnesian limestones by machinery, designing machine and car shops, etc."

In 1871 he became chief engineer of the Illinois Patent Coke Company for a year. In 1872 he became secretary of the Meier Iron Company, where he designed and build its blast furnaces for another year. From 1873 to 1875 he superintendent the St. Louis Interstate Fair machinery department. During this time he became actively interested in the St. Louis cotton industry and was associated with the St. Louis Cotton Factory and with the Peper Hydraulic Cotton Press, for both of whom he designed machinery for compressing cotton.

=== Later career ===
In 1884 Meier founded the Heine Safety Boiler Company for the development in the United States of the water-tube boiler of that name, and became its president and chief engineer. In those days he also joined the American Diesel Engine Company, where he introduced the Diesel motor into the United States. Until 1908 he was its engineer-in-chief and treasurer of the company.

Meier participated in a number of professional organizations, such as the St. Louis Engineers Club, the American Boiler Manufacturers Association, the Machinery and Metal Trades Association, and the American Society of Mechanical Engineers, where he was president in the year 1911–12.

Daniel Meier died in New York City, December 15, 1914.

== Publications ==
- E. D. Meier. "The engineer and the future; Presidential address 1911," in: Transactions of the American Society of Mechanical Engineers, New York City : The Society. Vol 33, 1911, p. 492-

Publications about

- "Colonel E. D. Meier," The Locomotive, Vol. 30, 1915, p. 149-150
