= Justice Meyer =

Justice Meyer may refer to:

- Bernard S. Meyer (1916–2005), judge of the New York Supreme Court and the New York Court of Appeals
- Helen Meyer (born 1954), associate justice of the Minnesota Supreme Court
- Louis B. Meyer (1933–1999), associate justice of the North Carolina Supreme Court
