= Hermann Mayr =

Hermann Mayr can refer to:

- Hermann Mayr (luger), a West German luger
- Hermann Mayr (skier) (1929–?), an Austrian cross-country skier
