= Meijer (surname) =

- Pronunciation: Dutch: [ˈmɛiər]
- Language: Dutch

Origin
- Meaning: Bailiff or steward
- Region of origin: Netherlands

Other names
- Variant forms: Meijers, Meyer, De Meyer, Meyers

Meijer is a Dutch surname. It refers to a profession similar to a bailiff or steward. It originates from the Latin word maior and is often rendered Meyer abroad.

As of 2007, there were 39,801 people with the surname Meijer in the Netherlands.

== People named Meijer ==
- Annita Meijer (born 1954), professionally known as Anita Meyer, Dutch singer
- Anthony J. H. M. Meijer, Professor of Chemistry at the University of Sheffield
- Arnold Meijer (1905–1965), Dutch politician
- Bengt Meijer, Swedish footballer
- Bert Meijer (born 1955), Dutch organic chemist
- Berthe Meijer (1938–2012), German-born Dutch Holocaust survivor and author
- Clara Meijer-Wichmann (1885–1922), German–Dutch lawyer, writer, and anarchist
- Connie Meijer (1963–1988), Dutch racing cyclist
- Cora Canne Meijer (1929–2020), Dutch mezzo-soprano and voice teacher
- Cornelis Simon Meijer (1904–1974), Dutch mathematician who introduced the Meijer G-function
- Doug Meijer (born 1955), American businessman, son of Frederik
- Eduard Meijer (1878–1929), Dutch swimmer and water polo player
- Elien Meijer (born 1970), Dutch rower
- Erik Meijer (politician) (born 1944), Dutch politician
- Erik Meijer (computer scientist) (born 1963), Dutch computer scientist
- Erik Meijer (footballer) (born 1969), Dutch football playerand manager
- Fik Meijer (born 1942), Dutch historian and author
- Frans Meijer (criminal) (born 1953), Dutch kidnapper
- Frank Nicholas Meyer (1875–1918), Dutch-born American explorer and botanist
- Fred Meijer (actor) (born 1960), Dutch voice actor
- Frederik Meijer (also known as Fred Meijer; 1919–2011), American businessman, son of Hendrik
- Geert Meijer (born 1951), Dutch football player
- Geertruida Wijsmuller-Meijer (née Truus Meijer; 1896–1978), Dutch war hero and resistance fighter
- Gerard Meijer (born 1962), Dutch physical chemist
- Han Meijer (born 1949), Dutch mechanical engineer and polymer chemist
- Hank Meijer (born 1952), American businessman, son of Frederik
- Hendrik Meijer (1883–1964), Dutch-born American businessman, founder of the Meijer hypermarket chain
- Henk Meijer (born 1959), Dutch taekwondo competitor and coach
- Henny Meijer (born 1962), Surinamese-Dutch football player
- Herma Meijer (born 1969), Dutch speed skater
- Herman Meijer (born 1947), Dutch politician
- Ischa Meijer (1943–1995), Dutch journalist, radio presenter, and author
- Jaap Meijer (1905–1943), Dutch track cyclist
- Jaap Meijer (writer) (1912–1993), Dutch historian and poet
- Jan Meijer (1921–1993), Dutch sprinter
- Johnny Meijer (1912–1992), Dutch accordionist
- Jonas Daniel Meijer (1780–1834), Dutch lawyer
- Karel Meijer (1884–1967), Dutch water polo player
- Klaasje Meijer (born 1995), Dutch pop singer
- Larissa Meijer (born 1990), Dutch field hockey player
- Lavinia Meijer (born 1983), Dutch harpist
- Leo Meijer (1873–1944), German film producer
- Leonie Meijer (born 1985), Dutch singer and songwriter
- Lodewijk Meijer (1629–1681), Dutch physician, scholar, playwright and Enlightenment radical
- Louis Meijer (1809–1866), Dutch painter, etcher, lithographer, and draftsman
- Lukas Meijer (born 1988), Swedish rock musician
- Markus Meijer (born 1970), Dutch real estate investor, son of Ton
- Mary Meijer-van der Sluis (1917–1994), Dutch fencer
- Michaela Meijer (born 1993), Swedish pole vaulter
- Patrick Meijer (born 1973), Dutch comedian
- Paul Meijer (racing driver) (born 1985), Dutch racing driver
- Paul Meijer (politician) (born 1967), Dutch politician
- Peter Meijer (born 1988), American politician, son of Hank
- Rogier Meijer (born 1981), Dutch footballer
- Sal Meijer (1877–1965), Dutch painter
- Sebastian Meijer (born 1984), Swedish ice hockey winger
- Selma Meijer (1890–1941), Dutch pacifist, feminist and resistance fighter
- Stijn Meijer (born 1999), Dutch footballer
- Tamara Meijer (born 1979), Dutch judoka
- Theo Meijer (judoka) (born 1965), Dutch judoka
- Ton Meijer, Dutch property developer, father of Markus
- Truus Meijer (1896–1978), Dutch war hero and resistance fighter
- Willem Meijer (1838–1909) Dutch missionary in China
- Willem Meijer (1923–2003), Dutch botanist
- Wim Meijer (Pacifist Socialist Party) (1923–2001), Dutch politician
- Wim Meijer (Labour Party) (born 1939), Dutch politician

De Meijer

- Hendrick de Meijer (1620–1689), Dutch landscape painter
- José de Meijer (1915–2000), Dutch politician
- Sadiqa de Meijer (born 1977), Canadian poet

Compound names

- Tippy de Lanoy Meijer (born 1943), Dutch field hockey player
- Willem van Walt Meijer (born 1958), Dutch sailor

== As a given name ==
- Meijer de Haan (1852–1895), Dutch painter
- Meijer Marcusz Roest (1821–1889), Dutch bibliographer

== See also ==
- Meijers (surname)
- Meyer (disambiguation)
