= Joseph L. Mayer =

American chemist

- Born: c.1875 New York City, New York, United States
- Died: 1 December 1933 (aged 57–58)
- Education: New York College of Pharmacy, Brooklyn College of Pharmacy
- Occupation: chemist
- Employer(s): Hegeman Company, Riker-Hegeman Company, Louis K. Liggett Company
- Notable work: United States Pharmacopoeia (contributor, 1920 rev)

Joseph L. Mayer (c. 1875 − 1 December 1933) was an American chemist.

He worked as chief chemist for the Hegeman Company, the Riker-Hegeman Company, and the Louis K. Liggett Company. He was born in New York City, and had two sisters, Dora and Hannah, and a brother, Fred. He never married. He studied at the New York College of Pharmacy, and then obtained his doctorate in pharmacy at the Brooklyn College of Pharmacy, where he later taught, ultimately becoming Professor of Analytical Chemistry there. His first job as a pharmacist was as a drug clerk for Benjamin Rosenzweig.

He worked on the 1920 revision of the United States Pharmacopoeia. His scientific articles appeared in the Journal of the American Pharmaceutical Association, and elsewhere. He also lectured on Shakespearean drama. He died on 1 December 1933.
