= Marc Meier =

Marc Meier is president of Bosch Healthcare Solutions GmbH.
