= Georg Mayr =

Bavarian priest and Hebrew grammarian (1564–1623)

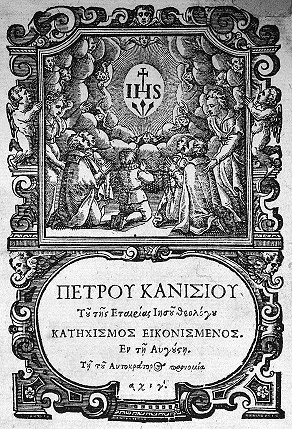
Title page (Augsburg 1613) of Mayr's Greek translation of the catechism of Canisius.

Georg Mayr (Latin Georgius Marius) (1564–1623) was a Bavarian Jesuit priest and Hebrew grammarian.

Mayr spent most of career teaching Hebrew language. His Hebrew grammar (Augsburg, 1616) went through many editions and he published many Hebrew translations. Mayr also published the illustrated version of the catechism of Peter Canisius, and then translations into Greek (Ingolstadt 1595) and Hebrew (1620).

== Works ==
- Hebrew New Testament, 1620
- Hebrew Grammar - Institutiones linguae Hebraicae, Augsburg, 1616
- Fasciculus Sacrarum Litaniarum
