= Klaus Mair =

Austrian politician (born 1977)

Member of the National Council
- Incumbent
- Assumed office 24 October 2024
- Constituency: Innsbruck Rural

Personal details
- Born: 22 May 1977 (age 48)
- Party: People's Party

Klaus Mair (born 22 May 1977) is an Austrian politician of the People's Party serving as a member of the National Council since 2024. He has served as deputy mayor of Vomp since 2010.
