= Ulrike Meier Yang =

German-American applied mathematician and computer scientist

Ulrike Meier Yang (born 1959) is a German-American applied mathematician and computer scientist specializing in numerical algorithms for scientific computing. She directs the Mathematical Algorithms & Computing group in the Center for Applied Scientific Computing at the Lawrence Livermore National Laboratory, and is one of the developers of the Hypre library of parallel methods for solving linear systems.

== Education and career ==
Meier Yang did her undergraduate studies in mathematics at Ruhr University Bochum in Germany, and worked in the Central Institute of Applied Mathematics of the Forschungszentrum Jülich in Germany from 1983 to 1985 and at the National Center for Supercomputing Applications at the University of Illinois Urbana-Champaign from 1985 to 1995. She completed her doctorate through the University of Illinois in 1995 with the dissertation A Family of Preconditioned Iterative Solvers for Sparse Linear Systems, supervised by Kyle Gallivan.

She joined the Lawrence Livermore National Laboratory research staff in 1998.

As of January 1st, 2023 Yang took office as a member of the SIAM Board of Trustees.

== Recognition ==
She is a SIAM Fellow, in the 2024 class of fellows, elected for "pioneering work on parallel algebraic multigrid and software, and broad impact on high-performance computing".
