= Johanna Maier =

Austrian chef (born 1951)

Johanna Maier (August 23, 1951 in Radstadt, province of Salzburg) is an Austrian chef. She is the first and so far only female chef to be awarded Four Toques by the Gault-Millau restaurant guide and two stars by the Michelin Guide.

== Career ==
Johanna's father was a bricklayer and her mother ran a small laundry. Johanna completed an apprenticeship as a cook and waitress in the sports hotel in her home town of Radstadt. At an apprenticeship competition in Salzburg in 1968, she met her future husband, military serviceman Dietmar Maier from Filzmoos. Johanna and Dietmar Maier went to Paris together in 1969. Johanna initially worked as an au pair, Dietmar as a trainee in a restaurant. They both returned to Austria in 1971. Their first child (Simone) was born, Johanna and Dietmar Maier married in a civil ceremony and, after the birth of their second child (Tobias), in a church wedding in 1973. They moved into the Gasthof Hubertus in Filzmoos, which was run by Dietmar's parents. Dietmar and his mother ran the kitchen, Johanna took care of the service and the guest rooms. Their third child (Ditmar) was born in 1983. When Johanna's mother-in-law died in 1984, Johanna took over the kitchen. After their first season, the couple celebrated with a meal at the Obauer brothers' home in Werfen; this became a key experience for Johanna Maier.

In 1984, she attended a cooking seminar lasting several days with Dieter Müller in Bischofshofen, assisted Hans Haas in Munich, André Jaeger in Schaffhausen and Jean-Georges Vongerichten in New York. In 1987, the year her fourth child was born, she was awarded her first toque by Gault-Millau.

The hotel has since been renamed Das Maier.

=== Awards ===
- 1987: One toque in Gault Millau
- 1989: Trophée Gourmet of the Gourmet magazine A la Carte
- 1993: Two toques in Gault Millau
- 1996: Chef of the Year in Gault Millau
- 1998: Three toques in Gault Millau
- 2001: Four toques in Gault Millau
- 2005: Two stars in the Michelin Guide
- 2010: Great Decoration of Merit of the State of Salzburg
- 2013: Three toques in Gault Millau
- 2021: Lifetime achievement by Gault Millau Austria for Johanna and Dietmar Maier

== Publications ==
- Johanna Maier. Cookbook, 2003. ISBN 3899102088.
- Meine Kochschule. Cookbook, 2005. ISBN 3899102746.
- Himmlisch gut! Cookbook, 2009. ISBN 3899104358.
