= Johannes Meier (German politician) =

German politician (born 1989)

Member of the Landtag of Bavaria
- Incumbent
- Assumed office 30 October 2023
- Constituency: Middle Franconia

Personal details
- Born: 11 March 1989 (age 37) Nuremberg
- Party: Alternative for Germany (since 2018)

Johannes Meier (born 11 March 1989 in Nuremberg) is a German politician serving as a member of the Landtag of Bavaria since 2023. He has served as deputy group leader of the Alternative for Germany since 2025.
