= Georg Meier (disambiguation) =

Georg Meier may refer to:

- Georg Friedrich Meier (1718–1777), German philosopher and aesthetician
- Georg Meier (1910–1999), German motorcycle racer.
- Georg Meier (chess player) (born 1987), German-Uruguayan chess grandmaster
