= Johann Meier (disambiguation) =

Johann Meier may refer to:

- Johann Hans Meier, American engineer
- Johann-Hermann Meier (1921–1944), German Luftwaffe military aviator
