= Meyer (footballer) =

Brazilian footballer

Personal information
- Full name: Meyer Carlos de Camargo Júnior
- Date of birth: January 29, 1980 (age 46)
- Place of birth: São Paulo, Brazil
- Height: 1.82 m (6 ft 0 in)
- Position: Defender

Team information
- Current team: South Melbourne FC
- Number: 80

Senior career*
Years	Team	Apps	(Gls)
?–2002	Santacruzense		
2003–?	Al-Nasr (Salalah)		
?–2005	Central Sport Club		
2005–2006	F.C. Matera	10	(1)
2006–2007	FC Baulmes	26	(0)
2007–2011	SR Delémont	9	(1)
2011	Melbourne Knights		
2011–	South Melbourne FC	1	
- * Club domestic league appearances and goals as of 13:58, 13 November 2007 (UTC)

Meyer Carlos de Camargo, Júnior (born 29 January 1980 in São Paulo), known as just Meyer, is a Brazilian football player. He currently plays for South Melbourne FC.

== Football career ==
He left Brazil for Al-Nasr (Salalah) of Oman in January 2003 and later returned to Brazil. In January 2006 he left again, this time to F.C. Matera of Italy. He was granted Italian passport by descent, and left for FC Baulmes and then SR Delémont.
