= Alexander Mair (disambiguation) =

Alexander Mair (1889–1969) was an Australian politician.

Alexander Mair may also be:

- Alexander Mair (physician) (1912–1995), Scottish public health expert
- Alexander Mair (minister) (1834–1911), leader of the United Presbyterian Church of Scotland
- Alexander Mair (music) (1940–2022), Canadian music industry executive
