= Julius Meier (disambiguation) =

Julius Meier (1874–1937) was an American businessman, civic leader and politician.

Julius Meier may also refer to:

- Julius Meier-Graefe (1867–1935), German art critic and novelist
- Julius L. Meier (1874–1937), American businessman and politician from Oregon
