= Francis S. Mair =

British chemist

Frank Mair
- Born: Francis S. Mair; Scotland
- Education: University of Strathclyde (BSc., PhD)
- Known for: Ligand Design; Inorganic synthesis Polymerization catalysis
- Awards: Ritchie Prize (1991)
- Scientific career
- Fields: Synthetic Chemistry; Inorganic Chemistry; Catalysis; Polymer Chemistry
- Workplaces: The University of Manchester
- Thesis: Synthesis and Bonding Studies on Icosahedral Borane and Carborane Anions for Neutron Capture Therapy &quot (1991)

Francis S. Mair is a British chemist and a Senior Lecturer in the Department of Chemistry at The University of Manchester. His research is based on synthetic chemistry, inorganic chemistry, catalysis and polymer chemistry.

== Education ==
Mair completed his Bachelor of Science degree in applied chemistry in 1988 at University of Strathclyde, where he investigated on borane cluster synthesis for his undergraduate research project. He continued to read for his Doctor of Philosophy degree at University of Strathclyde on Synthesis and Bonding Studies on Icosahedral Borane and Carborane Anions for Neutron Capture Therapy &quot and successfully completed it in 1991.

== Research and career ==
Mair worked as a research fellow at Queens from 1992 - 1993 where he worked on s-block coordination chemistry. He then moved to Trinity College Dublin as a lecturer where he worked on β-diketiminate ligands and s-block chemistry and in 1996 joined the Department of Chemistry at the University of Manchester as a lecturer in inorganic chemistry and later on was promoted to the position of senior lecturer.

Mair's research is based on synthetic chemistry, inorganic chemistry, catalysis and polymer chemistry, specifically in the area of ligand Design, inorganic synthesis and polymerization catalysis.

Apart from research and lecturing, Mair has also worked at the RSC, Manchester as the District Local Section Science Chair in 2017. He also works in many chemistry based outreach activities, including the flash-bang show as well as in the Salters festival.

=== Notable work ===
In 2015, Dr. Mair led a research to investigate the behaviour of β-triketimine cobalt complexes in the polymerization of isoprene, and upon confirmation of the capability to use such complexes in polymerization, led a further research in 2016 on the use of enamine–diimine cobalt complexes in isoprene polymerization. Both these researches indicated the potential to replace the use of more expensive neodymium complexes as a catalyst in the rubber industry, and also confirmed that the use of the cobalt complexes enhanced the polymerization rate of isoprene by 10 times, however also indicated issues including chances of cross-linking leading to gelation. In general, the capability to replace the highly demanded Neodymium based catalysts was observed in this research, and it also confirmed the potential to replace it with cobalt and even more cheaper and abundant iron which may eventually help to reduce the cost of rubber production in the future.

In 1999, Dr. Mair led a research on a new supramolecular packing motif where he showed how the structure of N,N′,N″-tris(2-methoxyethyl)benzene-1,3,5-tricarboxamide consists of aryl rings self-assembled using an organized π-stack surrounded by a triple helical network of hydrogen bonds confirming a new mode of organization for columnar liquid crystals.

In 1998, Dr. Mair also reported the first synthesis and use of the ligand, Dipp-NacNac as a N,N - bidentate anionic ligand, which is now currently one of the major alternatives that is available instead of common bulky ligands, including Cp^{*}, and [RC(NR‘)_{2}]^{−} (R = Me, Ph; R‘ = Me_{3}Si).

=== Awards and nominations ===
- Ritchie Prize (1991)

== Major publications ==
- Mair, Frank S.; Alnajrani, Mohammed N. (2015). "The behaviour of β-triketimine cobalt complexes in the polymerization of isoprene". RSC Adv. 5 (57): 46372–46385. Bibcode:2015RSCAd...546372A. doi:10.1039/C5RA06792H.
- Mair, Frank S.; Alnajrani, Mohammed N. (2016). "Bidentate forms of β-triketimines: syntheses, characterization and outstanding performance of enamine–diimine cobalt complexes in isoprene polymerization". Dalton Trans. 45 (25): 10435–10446. Bibcode:2015RSCAd...546372A. doi:10.1039/C5RA06792H. PMID 27264840.
- Pritchard, Robin G.; Warren, John E.; Lightfoot, Matthew P.; Mair, Frank S. (1999). "New supramolecular packing motifs: π-stacked rods encased in triply-helical hydrogen bonded amide strands". Chem. Commun. (19): 1945–1946. doi:10.1039/A905245C.
- Alnajran, Mohammed N.; Mair, Francis S. (2014). "Synthesis and characterization of β-triketimine cobalt complexes and their behaviour in the polymerization of 1,3-butadiene". Dalton Trans. 43 (42): 15727–15736. doi:10.1039/C4DT02196G. PMID 25211486.
- McDouall, Joseph J. W.; Weston, Laura; Pownall, Barnaby T.; Mair, Francis S. (2016). "Thallophilic Tl(i)–Tl(i) contacts mediated by Tl–aryl interactions. A computational study". Dalton Trans. 45 (20): 8433–8439. doi:10.1039/C6DT01035K. PMID 27108889. S2CID 26526570.
- Mair, Frank S.; Cope, Elaine K.; Clegg, William; Edwards, Andrew J. (1998). "Structural Characterization of [(2,6-Pr^{i}_{2}C_{6}H_{3})NC(Me)C(H)C(Me)N(2,6-Pr^{i}_{2}C_{6}H_{3})K·PhCH_{3}]_{∞}: A Heavy Alkali Metal Diazapentadienyl Complex". Inorg. Chem. 37 (9): 2317–2319. doi:10.1021/ic970956j. PMID 11670390.
