= Thomas D. Meier =

Swiss historian (born 1958)

Thomas Dominik Meier (born 1958 in Basel, Switzerland) is a Swiss historian. He has served as president of Zurich University of the Arts (ZHdK) from 2009 to 2022.

== Biography ==
Thomas D. Meier studied History, English, and American Studies at the University of Bern where he earned a doctorate for his dissertation on the integration and assimilation of homeless people in nineteenth-century Switzerland (“Heimatlose und Vaganten. Integration und Assimilation der Heimatlosen und Nicht-Sesshaften im 19. Jahrhundert in der Schweiz”; an expanded version was published by Chronos). Upon graduation, he first worked as a research assistant at the University of Bern before moving to the communications office and later to the executive management of the Historical Museum of Bern. From 1996, he was founding director of the Museum of Communication Bern, before his appointment as director of Bern University of the Arts in 2003. He became president of Zurich University of the Arts (ZHdK) in the autumn of 2009. From 2004 to 2011, he served as founding president of the Rectors’ Conference of Swiss Arts Universities. He is active in various national and international cultural and educational policy committees and strongly committed to the promotion of culture.

== Bibliography ==
- Thomas D. Meier/Rolf Wolfensberger, "Von der «Medizinal-Polizey» zur Volksgesundheitspflege", in: St. Galler Kantonsgeschichte, St. Gallen 2003.
- Thomas D. Meier/Rolf Wolfensberger, "Heimatlose und Nichtsesshafte im frühen 19. Jahrhundert", in: St. Galler Kantonsgeschichte, St. Gallen 2003.
- Thomas D. Meier (Hrsg.): Medium Museum – Kommunikation und Vermittlung in Museen für Kunst und Geschichte, Bern, Haupt 2000.
- Thomas D. Meier: "Bedrängte Kindheit. Kindheit bei den Fahrenden", in: Kind sein in der Schweiz. Eine Kulturgeschichte der frühen Jahre, hrsg. von Paul Hugger, Zürich, Offizin 1998.
- Martin Gasser/Thomas D. Meier/Rolf Wolfensberger: «Wider das Läugnen und Verstellen», Zürich, Offizin 1998.
- Thomas D. Meier/Rolf Wolfensberger: Eine Heimat und doch keine. Heimatlose und Nicht-Sesshafte in der Schweiz (16.-19. Jahrhundert), Zürich, Chronos 1998.
