= Richard Meier (disambiguation) =

Richard Meier (born 1934), is an American architect.

Richard Meier may refer to:

- Richard Meier (politician) (1906–1982), Liechtensteiner politician
- Richard L. Meier (1920–2007), American urban theorist
- Richard Meier (poet) (1970-2025), English poet
- Richard Meier (footballer) (born 2004), German footballer

== See also ==
- List of works by Richard Meier
- Richard Meier Model Museum, exhibition in Mana Contemporary cultural center in Jersey City, New Jersey
