= Myersville, Ohio =

Unincorporated community in Ohio, U.S.

Coordinates: 40°58′34″N 81°25′25″W

Myersville is an unincorporated community in Summit County, in the U.S. state of Ohio.

== History ==
Myersville was founded c. 1876. The community was named for J. B. Myers, the original owner of the town site. A post office called Myersville was established in 1882, and remained in operation until 1909.
