= Myers Hall =

Myers Hall may refer to:

- Myers Hall (University of Georgia), a college dormitory
- Myers Hall (Springfield, Ohio), listed on the U.S. National Register of Historic Places in Ohio
- Myers Hall (Indiana University), a college building displaying public art in Bloomington, Indiana
- Myers Hall (Carleton College), a dormitory located in Northfield, Minnesota.
