= Justice Myers =

Justice Myers may refer to:

- David Myers (Indiana judge) (1859–1955), associate justice of the Indiana Supreme Court
- George S. Myers (judge) (1881–1940), associate justice of the Ohio Supreme Court
- Henry L. Myers (1862–1943), associate justice of the Montana Supreme Court
- Louis Wescott Myers (1872–1960), chief justice of the California Supreme Court
- Quincy Alden Myers (1853–1921), associate justice of the Indiana Supreme Court
- Walter Myers Jr. (1914–1967), associate justice of the Indiana Supreme Court

== See also ==
- Judge Myers (disambiguation)
