= Christina Meier =

Christina Meier may refer to:

- Christina Meier (hostage), German hostage in Afghanistan
- Mother of Megan Meier and figure in the Suicide of Megan Meier
- Christina Meier (alpine skier) (born 1966)
