= Christoph Maier =

German politician (born 1984)

Member of the Landtag of Bavaria
- Incumbent
- Assumed office 5 November 2018
- Constituency: Swabia

Personal details
- Born: 16 August 1984 (age 41) Schwabmünchen
- Party: Alternative for Germany (since 2013)

Christoph Maier (born 16 August 1984 in Schwabmünchen) is a German politician serving as a member of the Landtag of Bavaria since 2018. He has served as chairman of the Alternative for Germany in Swabia since 2022.
