= Raymond Meier (disambiguation) =

Raymond Meier may refer to:

- Raymond Meier (photographer), Swiss photographer
- Raymond A. Meier (born 1952), American politician
