= William Meyers (disambiguation) =

William Meyers (1943–2014) was a South African boxer.

William Meyers may also refer to:

- William Frederick Meyers (1848–1912), Canadian politician
- William M. Colmer (middle name, Meyers, 1890–1980), American politician from Mississippi
