= Hans Mayr =

Hans Mayr may refer to:

- Hans Mayr (canoeist) (born 1944), Austrian sprint canoer
- Hans Mayr (trade unionist) (1921–2009), German trades unionist and politician
- Hans Mayr, founder of the shoemaking company Ed Meier, Munich
