= Diane Meier =

- Born: New York City, New York
- Occupations: marketer, writer
- Spouse: Multiple
- Relatives: Husband, Frank Delaney

Diane Meier is an author of The New American Wedding and The Season of Second Chances, and the founder of Meier, LLC, a luxury marketing firm founded in New York City. She has been a keen advocate of working women’s rights. She lived in New York City and Litchfield, Connecticut.
