= Gilbert Mair =

Gilbert Mair may refer to:

- Gilbert Mair (trader) (1799–1857), sailor and trader in New Zealand
- Gilbert Mair (soldier) (1843–1923), his son, New Zealand surveyor, interpreter, soldier and public servant
