= Hans Maier =

Hans Maier may refer to:

- Hans Maier (rower) (1909–1943), German rower
- Hans Maier (water polo) (1916–2018), Dutch water polo player
- Hans Maier (politician) (1931–2026), German political scientist, academic, and politician
- Hans W. Maier (1882–1945), German-Swiss psychiatrist
