= Leroy F. Meyers =

American mathematician

Leroy Frederick Meyers (June 30, 1927—November 8, 1995) was a mathematician.

== Early life ==
Meyers was the son of Joseph Meyers and Lillian Meyers née Gershun. He grew up in Brooklyn, New York, attending Queens College (graduated 1948) and later Syracuse University (Master's Degree in Mathematics: 1950; Ph.D. in Mathematics: 1953). He wrote his dissertation on "Certain Transformations of Hermitian Functionals" under advisor Charles Loewner.

== Professional life ==
Meyers was a Professor of Mathematics at Ohio State University from the fall of 1954 through 1995.

From 1975–1985, he was deeply involved in Mathematics Magazine, serving as its Associate Editor and during that time also 6 years as Problems Editor.

He died November 8, 1995, in Columbus, Ohio.
