= Maior of Arabia =

Maior (Ancient Greek: Μαΐωρ), better known as Maior of Arabia (Μαΐωρ Ἀράβιος) was a Greek sophist and rhetorician native of Arabia during the mid 3rd century AD. He was a contemporary of the sophists Apsines and Nicagoras, at the time of Roman emperor Philip the Arab (244–249).

There is little biographical information available about him. Like Nicagoras, Maior might have held an official chair of rhetoric at Athens. According to the Suda, he wrote thirteen books On Issues (Περὶ στάσεων).
