= Anne-Gudrun Meier-Scherling =

German lawyer (1906–2002)

Anne-Gudrun Meier-Scherling (born 26 July 1906 in Stendal; died 26 January 2002 in Kassel) was a German lawyer. In the GDR, she was persecuted because of her advocacy of human rights and freedom of expression and fled to the Federal Republic in 1950, initially without her children. She was District Court Counselor in Dortmund and Supreme Court Supervisor in Hamm. On April 7, 1955, she became the first woman to be appointed judge at the Federal Labor Court, which had just been established.
