= Ton Meijer =

Dutch property developer

- Occupations: Chairman, MARK Capital Management
- Spouse: Maya Meijer-Bergmans
- Children: Markus Meijer; Antony Meijer

Ton Meijer is a Dutch property developer, the chairman of MARK Capital Management (formerly Meyer Bergman), a London-based privately held real estate investment company, specialising in retail property.

In 1970, Meijer founded MAB Group, and was its president and CEO until the sale of the development business to Bouwfonds in 2004. MAB Group developed properties including Nice Etoile in Nice, France, Les Halles in Paris, and De Resident in The Hague, Netherlands.

Meijer is the chairman and co-founder of MARK Capital Management (formerly Meyer Bergman).

He is married to Maya Meijer-Bergmans, and his sons Markus Meijer and Antony Meijer work with him at MARK.
