= Markus Meijer =

- Born: Markus Sebastianus Meijer; September 1970 (age 55–56)
- Education: Leyden University; INSEAD
- Occupations: CEO, MARK Capital Management
- Parent(s): Ton Meijer; Maya Meijer-Bergmans

Markus Sebastianus Meijer (born September 1970) is a Dutch real estate investor, the chief executive officer (CEO) of MARK Capital Management, a London-based privately held real estate investment company, specialising in urban mixed-use property.

Markus Sebastianus Meijer was born in September 1970, the son of fellow property developer Ton Meijer. Meijer received an LLM degree in law from Leiden University in 1995, and an MBA from INSEAD in 2002.

In 2005, Meijer and his father co-founded MARK Capital Management.

In 2010, Meijer and his US partner Joseph Sitt bought London's Burlington Arcade for £104 million.
