= Yaël Meier =

Swiss actress

- Born: Yaël Andrina Meier; May 8, 2000 (age 26); Lucerne, Switzerland
- Occupations: Businesswoman; lecturer; journalist
- Years active: 2015–present
- Partner: Jo Dietrich
- Children: 2
- Honours: LinkedIn Top Voice

Yaël Andrina Meier (Swiss Standard German: [ˈjaːɛl ˈmaɪər]; born 8 May 2000) is a Swiss businesswoman, journalist, lecturer and former actress. She co-founded the marketing company Zeam GmbH in 2020.

Meier has been voted LinkedIn Top Voice twice and is among the largest social media influencers around Generation Z on a variety of platforms in the DACH region. She is also a best-selling author.

== Early life and education ==
Meier was born in Lucerne, Switzerland. Her father, Andreas Meier, is an account manager, her mother is a housewife of Italian descent. She primarily grew-up in Vitznau, where her family owns a home only steps away from Lake Lucerne. Meier did not pursue an academic degree and left school after completing her Matura. Since then, she has worked in the fields of acting and journalism, and formed her own marketing company with her partner.

== Career ==
In 2015, Meier first appeared in a feature film, playing the lead in Tobias Ineichen's drama 'Upload'. She was 14 years old. Meier said that being cast was a surprise since she went to the audition "for fun". Since then, Meier has acted in various cinema and television productions such as Lisa Brühlmann's film Blue My Mind and Natascha Beller's comedy The Fertile Years Are Over for.

In addition to acting, Meier works in journalism. Between 2017 and 2020, she was an editor at Blick, wrote a weekly column in Blick am Abend and had podcast called Yaël's Talk (discontinued in 2019). Between 2017 and 2019, she also worked as a production assistant and actress for the YouTube format Zwei am Morge on Swiss radio and television. As a freelance journalist, Meier writes articles and commentaries for the Weltwoche and the Neue Zürcher Zeitung.

On February 4, 2020, Meier and her partner Jo Dietrich founded ZEAM GmbH, an advertising and consulting agency specializing in Generation Z. Its main purpose is to bridge the gap between companies and the current generation of consumers and employees and providing this group with a voice.

== Personal life ==
Meier is in a relationship with Jo Dietrich. They share two children and reside in Zurich.

== Filmography ==
Meier has participated in film productions on a regular basis since 2015. Those include; Upload (2015), Blue My Mind (2017), The Fertile Years Are Over (2019), and Advent Advent (2020, SRF).
