= Mayr =

Mayr is a German surname. Notable people with the surname include:

- Albert Mayr (1943–2024), Italian composer
- Andrea Mayr (born 1979), Austrian female long-distance runner
- Anton Koslov Mayr, American photographer, author and filmmaker
- Antonia Mayr (born 1949), Austrian luger
- Beda Mayr (1742–1794), Bavarian Benedictine philosopher, apologist and poet
- Benedikt Mayr (born 1989), German freestyle skier
- Bernhard Mayr, German curler
- Camilo Mayr (born 1991), German archer
- Chrissie Mayr, American conservative, stand-up comedian, internet entertainer and YouTuber
- Christine Mayr-Lumetzberger (born 1956), Austrian nun
- Daniel Mayr (born 1995), German basketball player
- Elisabeth Mayr (born 1996), Austrian association football player
- Ernst Mayr (1904–2005), German American evolutionary biologist
- Ernst Mayr (computer scientist) (born 1950), German computer scientist and mathematician
- Evelyn Mayr (born 1989), Italian tennis player
- Georg Mayr (1564–1623), Bavarian Jesuit priest and Hebrew grammarian
- Gerald Mayr, German paleontologist and ornithologist
- Gunter Mayr (born 1972), Austrian economist
- Gustav Mayr (1830–1908), Austrian entomologist
- Hans Mayr (disambiguation), several people
- Heinrich Mayr (1854–1911), German botanist
- Heinz Mayr (born 1935), German racewalker
- Henry Mayr-Harting (born 1936), British medieval ecclesiastical historian
- Herbert Mayr (1943–2015), Italian politician
- Hermann Mayr (disambiguation), several people
- Jakob Mayr (1924–2010), Austrian prelate
- Jan Nepomuk Maýr (1818–1888), Czech operatic tenor, opera director, conductor, composer and music educator
- Johann Mayr (disambiguation)
- Jörg Mayr (born 1979), German ice hockey player
- Josef Mayr (1900–1957), German politician
- Josef Mayr-Nusser (1910–1945), Italian Roman Catholic
- Juan Mayr (born 1952), Colombian photographer and environmentalist
- Julia Mayr (born 1991), Italian tennis player
- Julius Mayr (1855–1935), German physician, chairman and writer
- Karin Mayr-Krifka (born 1971), Austrian sprinter
- Karl Mayr (1883–1945), German politician and officer
- Livio Mayr (born 1997), Austrian pair skater
- Luca Mayr-Fälten (born 1996), Austrian footballer
- Marco Mayr (born 1960), Swiss middle-distance runner
- Michael Mayr (1864–1922), Austrian historian, politician and Bundeskanzler (1920/1921)
- Nicola Mayr (born 1978), Italian speed skater
- Nikolaus Mayr-Melnhof (born 1978), Austrian racing driver
- Otto Mayr (1930–2025), German mechanical engineer and technology historian
- Patricia Mayr-Achleitner (born 1986), Austrian tennis player
- Richard Mayr (1877–1935), Austrian operatic bass-baritone
- Robert Mayr-Harting (1874–1948), Austrian-born Sudeten German politician
- Rudolf Mayr (born 1949), Austrian sailor
- Rupert Ignaz Mayr (1646–1712), German composer
- Simon Mayr (1763–1845), German composer
- Simon Marius (1573–1624), Simon Mayr in German, German astronomer
- Stephanie Mayr (born 1965), German curler
- Susanna Mayr, German Baroque painter
- Suzette Mayr, Canadian novelist
- Thomas Mayr-Harting (born 1954), Austrian diplomat
- Verena Mayr (born 1995), Austrian athlete
- Wolfgang Mayr (born 1944), Austrian journalist and former chief editor

== See also ==
- Mayr-Melnhof AG, a Vienna-based company
- Mayr-Harting
- Maior (disambiguation)
- Mayer (disambiguation)
- Meyr (disambiguation)
- Meyer (disambiguation)
- Meier (disambiguation)
- Meir (disambiguation)
