= Journal of Career Assessment =

- Discipline: Business, Psychology
- Language: English
- Edited by: Ryan D. Duffy

Publication details
- History: 1993-present
- Publisher: SAGE Publications
- Frequency: Quarterly
- Impact factor: 1.626 (2017)

Standard abbreviations
- ISO 4: J. Career Assess.

Indexing
- ISSN: 1069-0727 (print); 1552-4590 (web)
- LCCN: 94659000
- OCLC no.: 27926913

Links
- Journal homepage; Online access; Online archive

Journal of Career Assessment is a peer-reviewed academic journal that publishes papers in the field of Psychology. The journal's editor is Ryan D. Duffy (University of Florida). It has been in publication since 1993 and is currently published by SAGE Publications.

Topics include:

- Career assessment strategies
- Developments in instrumentation
- Validation of theoretical constructs
- Relationships between existing instruments
- Career assessment procedures
- Relationships between assessment and career counseling/development
- Review articles of career assessment strategies and techniques

== Abstracting and indexing ==
Journal of Career Assessment is abstracted and indexed in, among other databases: SCOPUS and the Social Sciences Citation Index. According to the Journal Citation Reports, its 2017 impact factor is 1.626, ranking it 44 out of 82 journals in the category ‘Psychology, Applied’.
