= Paul Meyers =

Paul Meyers may refer to:

- Paul Meyers (American football) (1895–1966), American football player
- Paul Meyers (cinematographer), American cinematographer
- Paul-Henri Meyers (born 1937), Luxembourgish politician

== See also ==
- Paul Myers (disambiguation)
