= Myers, Montana =

Myers
- Unincorporated community
- Location within the state of Montana
- Coordinates: 46°15′03″N 107°20′25″W
- Country: United States
- State: Montana
- County: Treasure
- Elevation: 2,677 ft (816 m)
- Time zone: UTC-7 (Mountain (MST))
  - Summer (DST): UTC-6 (MDT)
- GNIS feature ID: 774532

Myers is an unincorporated community in central Treasure County, Montana, United States, along the Yellowstone River. It lies along local roads west of the town of Hysham, the county seat of Treasure County. Myers' post office opened on October 31, 1911 and closed November 7, 1975.
