= Trace L. Hentz =

American poet and author

Trace L. Hentz is an American multi-genre author, artist, poet, and journalist of Shawnee and Cherokee descent. Her writing is mainly focused on Native Americans and Native American adoption issues.

== Name ==
Trace Lara Hentz has also been known as Trace A. DeMeyer, Tracy Ann DeMeyer, and Laura Jean Thrall-Bland.

== Biography ==
Hentz began investigating her adoption at the age of 22, which was one of many that stemmed from the Indian Adoption Projects. She was able to open her sealed adoption records, and with the information she found in her adoption file, Hentz spent the next 27 years looking for and connecting with her biological relatives.

Her memoir, One Small Sacrifice: Lost Children of the Indian Adoption Projects, chronicles the story of her adoption, and comments on both the history of the adoption of Native American children and its effect on those who were adopted. Hentz is an advocate for other Native American adoptees who are trying to discover their heritage. Her advocacy led to her and fellow adoptee Patricia Busbee compiling many Native American adoptee stories into the anthology Two Worlds: Lost Children of the Indian Adoption Projects.

Hentz's past has influenced her career, leading her to write for, and about, Native American tribes across the country. Hentz interviewed political prisoner Leonard Peltier in 1998, while he was still a prisoner in Leavenworth, a federal prison. In 2001, Hentz also attended the first intertribal Wiping the Tears Ceremony that was held in Wisconsin, where a public apology was issued by Shay Bilchik, who was the director of the Child Welfare League of America at the time.

== Career ==
Hentz graduated from the University of Wisconsin-Superior in 1978 with a Bachelor of Fine Arts in Theater and Communications. After graduating, Hentz was the lead singer and frontwoman for a number of bands. She also worked on a ranch, was a business owner, managed a Smithsonian Museum audio tour, and was the assistant for the president of a record label. She later became a staff writer, an editor and a publications manager for the publications news from Indian Country, Ojibwe Akiing, Pequot Times and Sawyer County Record.

=== Blue Hand Books ===
In 2011, Hentz founded Blue Hand Books, a publisher that features Native American authors.

Blue Hand Books helps Native American authors publish their work through the use of Amazon Create Space and PressBooks. Among Blue Hand Books' published writers are John Christian Hopkins, James Chavers Jr., and Hentz herself.

=== Publications ===
==== Books ====
- Honor Restored: Jim Thorpe's Olympic Medals from Olympics at the Millennium: Power, Politics and the Games, edited by Kay Shaffer and Sidonie Smith. New Brunswick, NJ: Rutgers University Press, 2000. ISBN 9780813528205
- One Small Sacrifice: Lost Children of the Indian Adoption Projects. Greenfield, MA: Blue Hand Books, 2012. ISBN 9780615582153
- Sleeps with Knives (as Laramie Harlow). Greenfield, MA: Blue Hand Books, 2012. ISBN 9781477494608
- Two Worlds: Lost Children of the Indian Adoption Projects. Greenfield, MA: Blue Hand Books, 2012. ISBN 9781479318285
- Unraveling the Spreading Cloth of Time (co-authored with MariJo Moore). Candler, NC: rENEGADE pLANETS pUBLISHING, 2013. ASIN B00C3M4824

==== Poetry ====
In addition to her chapbook of poetry, Sleeps With Knives, Hentz has contributed poems to a number of publications:

- What I Know in Spirit in the Woods, Bozell Worldwide/DaimlerChrysler, 1999.
- The Silence is So Loud in Invoking the Muse. International World of Poetry, 2004.
- Your God Doesn't Forget displayed in the Memphis Brooks Museum of Art, Tennessee, 2006.
- Your God Doesn't Forget, People Waking Up, and Heart-shaped Ass, beauty in pounds in Yellow Medicine Review, Spring 2008. Mankato, MN: Southern Minnesota State University, 2008.
- Jump in Rabbit and Rose (Kim Shuck ed.), 2010 and River Blood Corn, 2012.
- Earth's Funeral, Swallow Manifesto and Heart-shaped Ass in I Was Indian Vol. 2. Foothills Press, 2012.
- Swimmer in 30 Poems in November, Massachusetts, 2012.

== Awards ==
Hentz has received many awards from the Native American Journalists Association (NAJA), including:

- Best News Story, Honorable mention, "Free Peltier" (1998)
- Pequot Times Monthly General Excellence (2nd place) (2003)
- Best Feature Writing, Eastern Pequot Tribe (2nd place) (2003)
