= Lemaire =

Lemaire (or LeMaire or Le Maire) is a surname. Notable people with the surname include:

- Adrien Lemaire (1852–1902), French botanist
- Alfred Jean Baptiste Lemaire (1842–1907), French military musician
- Axelle Lemaire (born 1974), French politician
- Bernard Lemaire (1936–2023), Canadian businessman
- Bernard Lemaire (prefect) (1946-2009), French civil servant (prefect)
- Bruno Le Maire (born 1969), French Minister of Food, Agriculture and Fishing
- Christophe Lemaire (full name Christophe Patrice Lemaire, born 1979), French-born jockey
- Christophe Lemaire (born 1964), French fashion designer
- Charles LeMaire (1897–1985), American costume designer
- Charles Lemaire (explorer), Belgian explorer of the Belgian Congo
- Charles Antoine Lemaire (1800–1871), French botanist and botanical author
- Denise Lemaire (born 1956), former Canadian handball player
- Didier Lemaire (born 1975), French politician
- Edward LeMaire (died 1961), American figure skater
- Ferdinand Lemaire (1832–1879), French librettist and poet
- Ghislain Lemaire (born 1972), French judoka
- Isaac Le Maire (1558–1624), merchant for the Vereenigde Oostindische Compagnie
- Jacob Le Maire (1585–1616), Dutch explorer and discoverer of Cape Horn
- Jacques Gerard Lemaire (born 1945), former ice hockey centre and former coach of the New Jersey Devils in the National Hockey League
- Jean Lemaire de Belges (c. 1473–c. 1525), Walloon poet and historian who lived primarily in France
- Jean-Marie Lemaire (1936–2012), Belgian Olympic rower
- Louis Marie Lemaire (1824–1910), French painter
- Madeleine Lemaire (1845–1928), French painter
- Maximiliaan le Maire (1606–1654), Dutch officer for the Vereenigde Oostindische Compagnie
- Paulin Lemaire (1882–1932), French gymnast
- Philema Lemaire (1856–1932), French politician and a Governor General of Pondicherry in Second French Colonial Empire
- Philippe Joseph Henri Lemaire (1798–1880), French sculptor
- Robert Lemaire (1916–1994), Belgian chess master
- Aimée Bologne-Lemaire (1904–1998), Belgian feminist, member of the Resistance, and Walloon activist
- Louis François Auguste Cauchois-Lemaire (1789–1861), French journalist

== See also ==
- Lemaire Channel, a strait off Antarctica, named after Charles Lemaire
- Le Maire Strait, a strait between Tierra del Fuego and Isla de los Estados, named after Jacob Le Maire
