= Paul Meier =

Paul Meier may refer to:

- Paul Meier (athlete) (born 1971), German athlete
- Paul Meier (statistician) (1924–2011), American statistician
- Paul Meier (voice coach) (born 1947), British-American dialect and voice coach

== See also ==
- Paul L. Maier (1930–2025), professor of Ancient History
- PZ Myers (born 1957), American scientist and Associate Professor of Biology
- Paul Meyer (disambiguation)
