= Josef Mayr =

German politician (1900-1957)

Josef Mayr (June 16, 1900 in Augsburg – August 2, 1957 in La Spezia, Italy) was the mayor of Augsburg, Germany, between 1934 and 1945. He was a member of the Nazi Party.
