= Myer (disambiguation) =

Myer is a department store that operates Australia-wide.

Myer may refer to:

- Myer (name)
- Myer Centre, Adelaide, a building in Adelaide
- Myer Centre, Brisbane, a shopping centre in Brisbane
- Myer House (disambiguation), several houses in the US National Register of Historic Places
- Fort Myer, a U.S. Army post in Virginia, not to be confused with Fort Myers, Florida
- MYER, ICAO code for Rock Sound International Airport, Bahamas
- Myer Classic, an Australian Thoroughbred horse race

== See also ==
- Mayer (disambiguation)
- Meyer (disambiguation)
- Meyers (disambiguation)
- Myers (disambiguation)
- Von Meyer
