= Meir (disambiguation) =

Meir is a Jewish given name and surname.

Meir may also refer to:

== Places ==
- Meir (Antwerp), Belgium, the city's pre-eminent shopping street
- Meir Park, Tel Aviv, a public park
- Meir, Egypt, a village in Upper Egypt
- Meir, Staffordshire, England, suburb of Stoke-on-Trent
- Meire Grove, Minnesota, USA
- Shalom Meir tower, a building in Tel Aviv, Israel

== Arts and entertainment ==
- Meir (album), a 2013 album by Norwegian rock band Kvelertak
