= Meyr =

Meyr may refer to:

- Meyr (surname)
- Meyr, Iran
