= Mayer =

Mayer may refer to:

- Mayer (name)

== Places ==
- C. Mayer (crater), named after Christian Mayer
- Mayer, Syria
- Mayer, Arizona, United States
- Mayer, Minnesota, United States
- Mayersville, Mississippi, United States
- Mayerthorpe, Alberta, Canada
- T. Mayer (crater), named after Tobias Mayer

== Companies ==
- Mayer Brown, an international law firm
- Metro-Goldwyn-Mayer, a motion picture production company
- Mayer Hoffman McCann P.C., a U.S. CPA firm
- Mayers Murray & Phillip, an architectural firm
- Oscar Mayer, a meat company
- Victor Mayer, a German jewelry manufacturer

== Other ==
- Meyer, one of a number of stock musical phrases known collectively as Galant Schemata
- Mayer Authority, European consortium (1955–1958) led by René Mayer
- Mayer expansion
- Mayer's Relation
- Mayer f-function
- Mayer-Norton theorem
- Mayer-Vietoris sequence

== See also ==
- Mayers (surname)
- Maya (disambiguation)
- Mayor (disambiguation)
- Meyer (disambiguation)
- Meir (disambiguation)
- Myer (disambiguation)
