= Myers =

- Pronunciation: Plural Myerses; possessive Myers', Myerses'

Origin
- Origin: Germans, Ashkenazi Jews and American Jews
- Meaning: "son of Mayer"

Other names
- Variant forms: Meyers, Myars, Myres, Miers, Miares, Myeres

Myers as a surname has several origins, e.g. Germans, Ashkenazi Jews and American Jews.

== People ==
- Abram F. Myers (1889–after 1960), chair of the Federal Trade Commission and later general counsel and board chairman of the Allied States Association of Motion Picture Exhibitors
- Alan Myers (disambiguation), various people
- Albert Cook Myers (1874–1960), American historian
- Allan Myers (born 1947), Australian lawyer, businessman and philanthropist
- Amina Claudine Myers (born 1942), American pianist, organist, vocalist, and composer
- Amy Myers (born 1938), British mystery writer
- Amy Myers (artist) (born 1965), American artist
- Andy Myers (born 1973), English footballer
- Andrew Myers (cyclist) (born 1968), Jamaican cyclist
- Andrew Myers (racing driver) (born 1980), American racing driver
- Andrew Myers (politician), Minnesota politician
- Arthur Myers (disambiguation), various people
- Barry Myers (disambiguation), various people
- Baruch Myers (born 1964), American rabbi
- Ben Myers (born 1976), British writer
- Billie Myers (born 1971), British rock singer and songwriter
- Brad Myers (disambiguation), various people
- Bret Myers (born 1980), American soccer player and professor
- Brian Myers (disambiguation), various people
- Brett Myers (born 1980), American baseball player
- Bruce Myers (disambiguation), various people
- Bryant Myers (born 1998), Puerto Rican reggaeton singer
- Calev Myers, American–Israeli lawyer
- Carlton Myers (born 1971), British-born Italian basketball player
- Charles Myers (disambiguation), various people
- Daisy Myers (1925–2011), African American educator
- Daniel J. Myers (born 1966), American sociologist, professor, and textbook author
- David Myers (disambiguation), multiple people
- Dee Dee Myers (born 1961), American pundit; former White House Press Secretary
- Dwight Myers (1967–2011), birth name of Heavy D, Jamaican-American actor, record producer, rapper, leader of Heavy D & the Boyz
- Elizabeth Myers (disambiguation)
- Emma Myers (born 2002), American actress
- Ernest Myers (disambiguation), various people
- Eugene Myers (born 1953), U.S. professor at University of California, Berkeley
- Florence Myers (1889–1973), American politician
- Frank Myers (disambiguation), various people
- Frederic Myers (1811–1851), Church of England clergyman and author
- Frederic W. H. Myers (1843–1901), English poet, classicist, philologist, and a founder of the Society for Psychical Research
- Garry Cleveland Myers (1884–1971), American psychologist
- George Myers (disambiguation), various people
- Glenford J. Myers (born 1946), American computer scientist, entrepreneur
- Greta Myers (born 2004), American speed skater
- Gustavus Myers (1872–1942), American reporter, feature writer
- Harry Myers (disambiguation), various people
- Henry Myers (disambiguation), various people
- Isabel Briggs Myers (1897–1980), American author who co-created the Myers-Briggs Type Indicator
- James Myers (disambiguation), several people
- Jerome Myers (1867–1940), American painter
- Joel Myers (born 1939), founder and executive chairman of AccuWeather
- John Myers (disambiguation), various people
- Judith Myers (disambiguation), various people
- Kathleen Myers (1899–1959), American actress
- Kevin Myers (born 1947), Irish journalist
- Kris Myers, drummer for the band Umphrey's McGee
- Kyle Myers, American YouTube actor/presenter
- Leo Myers (1881–1944), British novelist
- Leonard Myers (disambiguation), various people
- LeRoy Myers (1919–2004), American tap dancer
- LeRoy E. Myers Jr. (born 1951), American politician (R-MD)
- Lon Myers (1858–99), American world-record-setting runner
- Lou Myers (disambiguation), various people
- Lynn Myers (born 1951), Canadian politician
- Malcolm Myers (1917 – 2002) American painter, printmaker and professor known primarily for his Intaglio-style engravings.
- Margaret Good Myers (1899–1988), American economist
- Matthew Myers (disambiguation), various people
- Maurice William Myers (1821–1899), American librarian
- Meg Myers (born 1986), American musician
- Michael Myers (disambiguation), various people
- Mitzi Myers (1939–2001), American literary scholar
- Mordecai Myers (disambiguation), various people
- Paul Myers (disambiguation), various people
- Philip Myers (disambiguation), various people
- Philippe Myers (born 1997), Canadian ice hockey player
- Quincy Alden Myers (1853–1921), Justice of the Indiana Supreme Court
- Randy Myers (born 1962), American baseball player
- Richard Myers (disambiguation), various people
- Rob Myers (born 1986), American football player
- Robert Myers (disambiguation), various people
- Rollo Myers (1892–1986), English music critic, writer and translator
- Ronald Myers (1956–2018), American physician, minister, musician and activist
- Russell Myers (born 1938), American cartoonist
- Samuel Myers (disambiguation), various people
- Shirley Myers, Canadian country music artist
- Slate Myers (born 2009 or 2010), American racing driver
- Stanley Myers (1933–1993), British film composer
- Stewart Myers, American academic, educator
- Theodore W. Myers (1844–1918), American banker and New York City Comptroller
- Thomas Myers (disambiguation), several people
- Tobias Myers (born 1998), American baseball player
- Toby Myers (1949–2025), American musician
- Tyler Myers (born 1990), American-born Canadian ice hockey player
- Vali Myers (1930–2003), Australian artist
- Vernā Myers (born 1960) American diversity consultant, author, speaker, lawyer, and corporate executive.
- Walter Myers (disambiguation), various people
- William Myers (disambiguation), various people
- Woody Myers (born 1954), American physician and politician

== Fictional characters ==
- Get Blake Myers
- Eric Myers, the Quantum Ranger
- Michael Myers (Halloween)
- Nina Myers (24)
- Ros Myers (Spooks)

== See also ==
- Maier
- Mair (surname)
- Mayer (name)
- Mayr
- Meier (surname)
- Meir (name)
- Meyer (disambiguation)
- Meyers
- Meyerson
- Meyr (surname)
- Myer (disambiguation)
- Myers's Rum
- Von Meyer
