= Cook Park, Orange =

Urban park in New South Wales, Australia

Cook Park
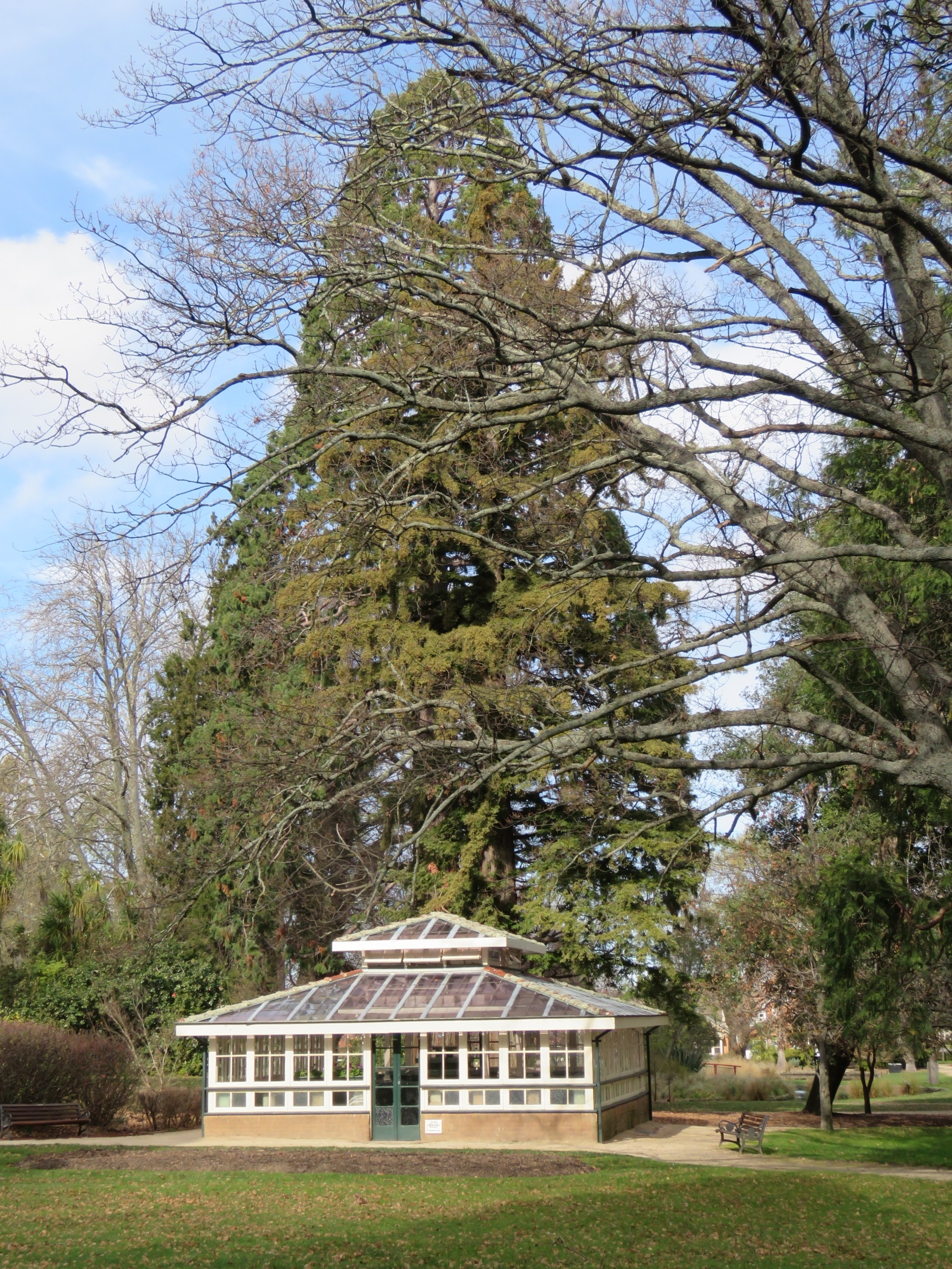
- Blowes Conservatory in July 2026
- Interactive map of Cook Park
- Type: Urban park
- Location: 24–26 Summer Street, Orange, City of Orange, New South Wales, Australia
- Coordinates: 33°17′00″S 149°05′24″E
- Area: 4 hectares (9.9 acres)
- Created: 1873; 153 years ago
- Designer: Alfred Patterson
- Etymology: James Cook
- Operator: City of Orange
- Open: All year
- Design style: High Victorian

New South Wales Heritage Register
- Official name: Cook Park; Orange Botanic Garden
- Type: State heritage (landscape)
- Designated: 24 August 2018
- Reference no.: 1998
- Type: Urban Park
- Category: Parks, Gardens and Trees
- Builders: Alfred Patterson

Cook Park is a heritage-listed 4-hectare (10-acre) urban park at 24–26 Summer Street, Orange, a city in the Central West region of New South Wales, Australia. It was designed and built by Alfred Patterson from 1873 to 1950. It is also known as Orange Botanic Garden. It was added to the New South Wales State Heritage Register on 24 August 2018. The park's main entrance is from the corner of Summer Street and Clinton Street.

== Etymology ==
The park is named in honour of Captain James Cook, a British explorer, navigator, cartographer, and captain in the British Royal Navy. He made detailed maps of Newfoundland prior to making three voyages to the Pacific Ocean, during which he achieved the first recorded European contact with the eastern coastline of Australia and the Hawaiian Islands, and the first recorded circumnavigation of New Zealand.

== History ==
Before the park the area was originally the old travelling stock reserve used in the 1870s as a camping ground for teams.

Cook Park, like Robertson Park, Orange, owes its existence to government action long before its proclamation. The park was created by popular petition of the local Member of Parliament. In 1853 the area was set out for housing "Reserved for Mr Templer". In 1854 the whole block which became Cook Park was withdrawn from public auction and retained as open space at the south west corner of the township. Though the 1860 plan still showed the details of the abortive subdivision in 20 lots, the 1864 plan marked the block as "proposed reserve" and so it remained. In the 1870s there was a second attempt to develop the site and a second public petition.

The cannon in Cook Park was obtained from a collection distributed throughout NSW after cannons became obsolete for the defence of Sydney Harbour. It was obtained from what is now Sydney City Council in 1870. It bears the initials G3R, indicating that it was made in the reign of George III (1751–1820). It has been identified as a 11-kilogram (24 lb) smooth bore, cast about 1806 at the Carron Iron Foundry in Scotland.

The park was proclaimed in 1873 and officially named in honour of Captain James Cook in 1882. The reserve was naturally swampy: Mr Sheridan recalled how his friend Harry Albon talked of paddling there and catching frogs and tadpoles as a small boy in the 1870s. In April 1882 the name Cook Park was applied to the area in honour of Captain James Cook and in the late 1880s or in 1890 plantings began, the first plantings worth A£20 being made by Council staff. Some may have even been planted as early as the 1870s. The earliest plantings included elms (Ulmus sp.), oaks (Quercus sp.), lindens (Tilia sp.), poplars (Populus sp.), redwoods (Sequoia sp. and Sequoiadendron giganteum), cypress (Cupressus sp.) and ash (Fraxinus sp.) trees. c. 1882 – four deodar cedars (Cedrus deodara) were planted. These are now approximately 140 years old. Also a big tree/ redwood (Sequoiadendron giganteum). This tree is one of the earliest in Cook Park.

Lawns and flower beds, and a gravel walk, conservatory and two pavilions were also constructed; from there on the park developed and took shape. Shrubberies, annual beds, bulb beds and exotic trees all became a feature of the park. Much of the design of the straight paths and rows of trees remain in place. A good example of a High Victorian style public park, Cook Park has a series of paths radiating from a central hub in which stand the bandstand and the John Gale Memorial Fountain.

In 1887 Andrew Patterson was employed as the first curator and was instrumental in the development of the park during this early period. In that year a Caretakers Cottage was built at a cost of A£185. Another curator Mr Bastick and his son formed two generations serving this park as curators. The cottage/lodge was named Bastick Cottage to honour former parks and gardens supervisors (father and son) who gave a total of 90 years service to Orange. They lived in this cottage/lodge, which was used up until the 1970s. It is now used as a craft shop.

There is evidence (records) of transfers of trees from Bloomfield Mental Hospital to Cook Park and Duntryleague - the hospital grounds being used as a kind of holding area. To make a virtue of the water supply, a small lake was created in the park in 1890, with an island in the middle. The ornamental lake on the park's south-western edge was excavated about 1880. Today it is a duck pond and provides a site for picnics. Many ducks live on its islands and goldfish and tortoises live in the pond. Picnic tables and swings are located nearby.

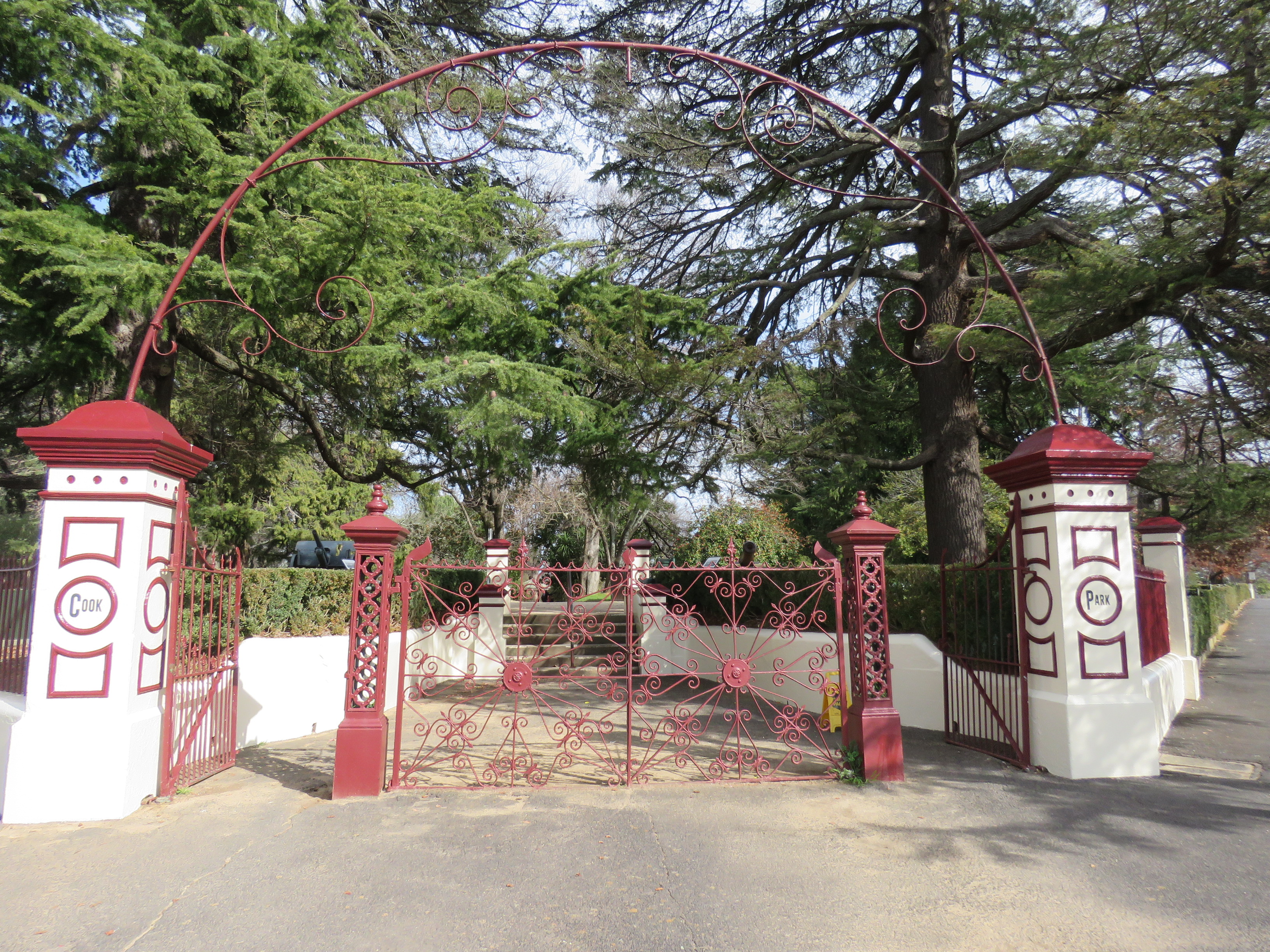
The Clinton Street-Summer Street corner gates in 2016

The remarkable assortment of trees, shrubs and flowers, with a conservatory and the two rustic pavilions mostly date from the 1890s. The James Dalton Fountain was donated in 1891 by very prominent Orange townsman, James Dalton, a wealthy merchant who was part owner of Dalton Bros store, now the site of Grace Bros. It was erected in the park on the central axis off Summer Street near the central bandstand. It is built of cast iron and the water falls from a central pipe down over three levels. On one of these levels four boys with urns stand on an acanthus embossed plinth. Above this level there is fern frond decoration and three storks. The Clinton Street-Summer Street corner gates were erected in the 1890s.

A lodge, erected in about 1900, is built of sandstock brick and has a corrugated iron roof. Two more lakes were excavated by 1908, full of gold and silver fishes and turtles. A further fountain in memory of John Gale was erected in 1908 (and remodelled in the 1920s).

The octagonal bandstand with its attractive carved wooden fittings, from which "the Orange Band discourses sweet music" opened on 12 March 1908, bringing the park very much to its present condition, the town band having decided in 1907 to build bandstands in Cook and Robertson Parks. The bandstand is octagonal and built on a brick foundation. It has carved timber columns and a railing and a weatherboard ceiling. The frieze is of carved timber and the peaked roof is tiled. Original gas fittings and music stands are extant. A delightful set of photographs of Cook Park was published in the Orange District Guide for 1908 and gives a good basis for modern comparison.

In the 1920s the fountain was remodeled and it took on its present form. A small lake was built in the park in 1890. In 1938 the ferneries were built and this structure contains the fountain from the original bush house, this fountain being cast iron and having swan modelling. The park has two sets of notable cast iron gates. Of these the most impressive are those on the Clinton Street-Summer Street corner which were erected in the 1890s. The other set, on the Summer Street-Sampson Street corner, were made in Parkes and were moved from Orange's Robertson Park to Cook Park in 1927. They were made by Dick Venebles of Parkes and paid for by funds raised by holding a sham fight and military display at the Gosling Creek Water Reserve.

During the depression of the 1930s numerous unemployment relief projects were carried out in Orange. These included the building of a new conservatory and fernery in Cook Park. The Blowes Conservatory was finished in 1934 was donated by Mayor A. Blowes to grow tuberous begonias in. Blowes became interested in these plants when C. W. Curran, a local storekeeper introduced them in the town. A large number of the original plants were donated by the City of Ballarat. It has retained a high reputation for its begonia displays.

The original aviary was donated by Dr Wally Maws, Mayor of Orange 1936–44 and 1948–50. It was enlarged in 1995. The latticed fernery was completed in 1938: incorporating two pieces of Daltoniana: the John Gale Memorial Fountain of 1891 is now located inside the fernery. It was originally located on an island in the centre of a small lake which was remodelled into the Frank Mulholland Memorial Garden. The other Dalton piece is the weathervane which had rotated above the Duntryleague stables in the 19th century.

The fernery was later restored as a bicentennial project in 1988. It contains many tree ferns and other shade loving plants. Also in 1938 the Frank Mullholland Memorial Garden, a sunken garden with sundial, was dedicated. Mullholland was Town Clerk from 1895–1935. The sunken garden and sundial were donated on 14 February 1938 by the Hon E. S. Spooner.

1940s – The German "Whiz Bang" Gun stood in Robertson Park for many years. It had been captured on the Somme in France by the 33rd Battalion of the 9th Brigade 3rd Australian Division. Many soldiers of this Brigade came from the Orange district. It was allocated to the Memorial Hall Trustees. It was removed from Robertson Park to Cook Park in the 1940s. Cook Park has many mature plantings and stands on Orange's main street. It is one of a number of public parks in the city and has won many awards for its displays.

The park was classified by the National Trust of Australia (NSW) in 1976, with special reference to the bandstand, fountain, conservatory, main entrance gates and the mature trees.

=== Alfred Patterson ===
Alfred Andrew Patterson (c. 1859 (Note: Also estimates that he was born in 1857)–1932), surveyor and gardener, was born in Drottningholm, Sweden and graduated from Uppsala University. Aged only 18 he was appointed lecturer at Hamburg University, Germany and afterwards left for England. He migrated to Australia, working variously as surveyor on the Mount Bischoff railway (Tasmania) and the Nyngan-Byrock railway, interspersed with botanical collecting in Queensland. Following a severe illness he worked as a gardener for merchant James Dalton, at Duntryleague, Orange, an 1870s mansion set in magnificent grounds. (Note: Patterson was employed by Dalton who was MLA for Orange, probably at his property "Kangaroobie" and probably in 1885 as this is the year the NSW contingent left for the Sudan War, to which Patterson was travelling when put off the train in Orange, with typhoid.) Through Dalton's influence he became the head gardener at Cook Park, Orange, (Note: When Cook Park was opened in 1887, he became the first head gardener, a position he held for 3 years. The site had been a swamp. A 14 April 1890 Bathurst Times editorial noted Patterson had "by dint of hard work and exercise of skill, brought Cook Park, Orange to its present state of perfection".) and he was subsequently (Note: In early 1890 a deputation from Bathurst, including Mayor Ald. Simmons and local MLA, W. H. Paul, went to Orange, ostensibly to examine the gravitational water supply scheme, and were taken to Cook Park where they met Patterson, and happened to mention Bathurst was seeking a Head Gardener to lay out the new Machattie Park in Bathurst and that a competition was first being held to find a design for the park. In March 1890 Bathurst Council advertised for a Head Gardener and in April Patterson was appointed. This caused some disquiet amongst the Aldermen of Orange.) head gardener at Machattie Park, Bathurst, for 20 years of a formative period in its development. He spent the remainder of his career as a shire engineer in country NSW.

Both Cook and Machattie Parks were difficult sites to develop. Cook Park was on a swamp...Both Cook Park and Machattie Park were designed and developed in the grand Victorian style with wide sweeping paths, a pond, a fernery and towering exotic trees reminiscent of "The Old Country". This was not only because that style was "the flavour of the day" but it was the background that both Patterson and Lynch knew. In describing Machattie Park, Gutteridge, Haskins & Davey state: 'The design of Machattie Park is typical in many respects of the great Victorian era of Parks and Gardens where there was a return to the more formal French and Italian styles of design, as opposed to the more naturalistic English style of the 18th century. All manner of new styles were being adopted at this time along with the enormous influx of new and exotic plants being introduced from all over the globe.

The basic philosophy behind the Parks and Gardens Movement in Europe was that space was essential for human wellbeing and a healthier society. The design of ornamental parks relied, in particular, on the planting of trees and shrubs to control views and to highlight contrasts in form, colour, texture, light and shade. The cumulative effect was to impose a sense of beauty and grandeur on the visitor.

In Australia where heavy industrialisation was not yet such a concern, ornamental parks, while relying on similar design principles, were provided more to beautify urban centres and as symbols of civic pride. This certainly is the case with Machattie Park. In 1900 and 1901 Patterson was seconded by the NSW Government to organise the floral displays for the Federation celebrations in Centennial Park, Sydney and the arrival of the Duke and Duchess of York (the future King & Queen). Patterson published a regular gardening column in the Bathurst Daily Times and his reputation as a gardener flourished throughout the NSW Central West.

== Description ==
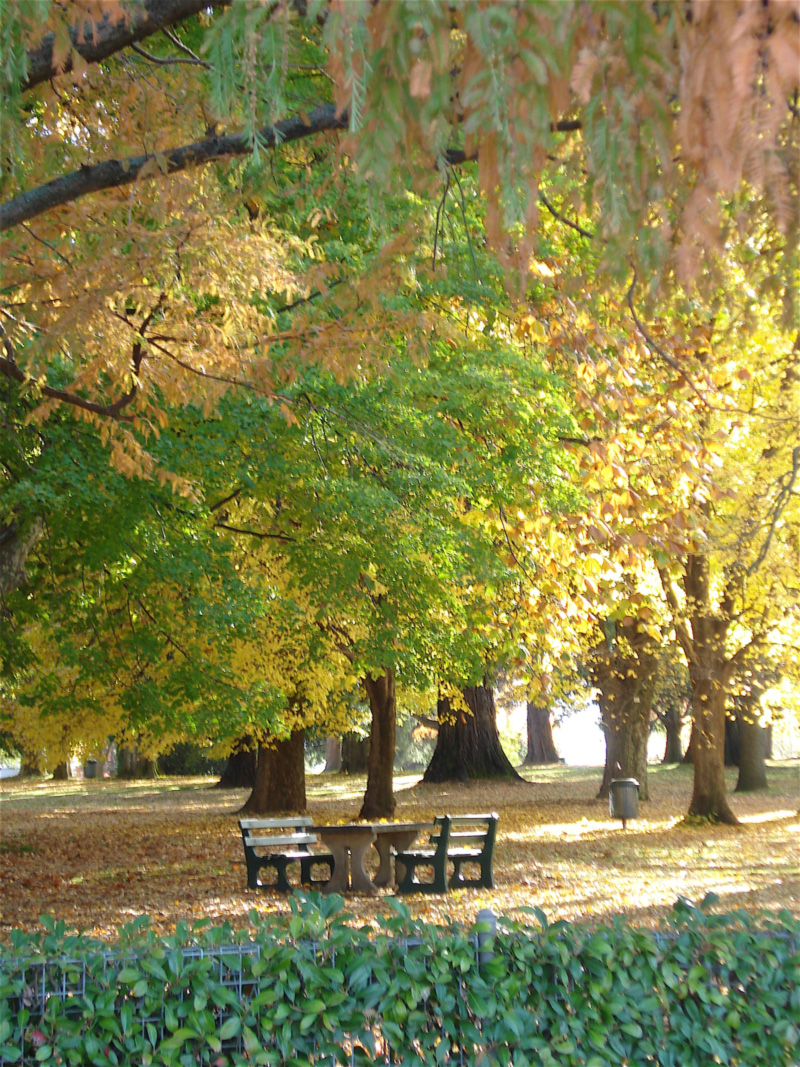
Autumnal colours, April 2008

Cook Park is an area of 4 hectares (10 acres) bounded by Summer, Sampson, Kite and Clinton Streets, with plantings dating from at least the 1880s (the cedars). Tree plantings were made in the 1870s and 1880s. A feature was unmatched pairs of trees on path crossing points. Today the park has over 200 trees, 20 beds of annual flowers and four staff. Cook Park is set out on a radial plan, planted on a plan of paths radiating (in the form of a Union Jack flag) from a central hub where stand the (1908) bandstand and a cast iron (1891) fountain. An avenue of elms (Ulmus campestris syn. U.procera) is in the park's south-west, lining an axial path. The park has radiating and crossing travel paths set in fine lawns. The park has two sets of notable cast iron gates (1890 and 1927) mark the imposing entrances from the main street corners.

From the 1870s onwards a fine collection of exotic trees were planted including elms (Ulmus procera) and weeping Scotch elm (U.glabra 'Pendula' ), oaks (Quercus spp.), lindens (Tilia sp.), poplars (Populus sp.), redwoods or big trees (Sequoiadendron giganteum), cypresses (Cupressus sp.), firs (Abies sp.), ash (Fraxinus sp.), 4 Himalayan cedars (Cedrus deodara) and walnuts (Juglans sp.) are growing with two bunya pines (Araucaria bidwillii) and one Tasmanian blue gum (Eucalyptus globulus). It also has a specimen of blue/Himalayan pine (P.wallichiana).

Tree plantings that are among the oldest remaining today include: English elms (Ulmus procera); London planes (Platanus x hybrida); New Zealand cabbage tree (Cordyline australis); Lawson cypress (Chamaecyparis lawsoniana); English oak (Quercus robur); linden/lime (Tilia cordata); redwood or big tree (Sequoiadendron giganteum) - one of the oldest trees in the park; holly (Ilex aquifolium); stone pine (Pinus pinea) and bull bay/ evergreen magnolia (M.grandiflora) both near Spencer Road; Algerian oak (Quercus macrocarpa); two large Himalayan cedars (Cedrus deodara); bunya pine (Araucaria bidwillii); Arizona cypress (Cupressus glabra/C.lusitanica); English ash (Fraxinus excelsior); blue Atlas cedar (Cedrus atlantica 'Glauca' ); Bhutan cypress (Cupressus torulosa); cherry laurel (Prunus laurocerasus); swamp cypress (Taxodium distichum); Western yellow pine (Pinus ponderosa); golden willow (Salix matsudana 'Aurea' ); NZ flax (Phormium tenax); strawberry tree (Arbutus unedo); Photinia glabra (trunk over 1 metre (3 ft) diameter); bay laurel hedge (Laurus nobilis); sweet gum (Liquidambar styraciflua); Indiana bean tree (Catalpa bignonioides); coastal redwood (Sequoia sempervirens); camphor laurel (Cinnamomum camphora).

Other mature plantings (probably dating from across the 20th century) include: English elms (Ulmus procera) forming a c. 60—year old avenue along one of the diagonal paths near Kite and Clinton Streets in the park's south-east corner; Rhododendron spp./cv.s; tree tulip (Magnolia x soulangeana); pin oak (Quercus palustris); horse chestnut (Aesculus sp.); maidenhair tree (Ginkgo biloba); Japanese laurel (Euonymus japonicus); blue spruce (Picea pungens cv.); dwarf cypress (Chamaecyparis sp./cv.); Douglas fir (Pseudotsuga menziesii); copper beech (Fagus sylvatica 'Purpurea' ); lemon verbena (Backhousia citriodora); lemonwood/tarata (Pittosporum eugenioides); beauty bush (Kolkwitzia amabilis); funeral cypress (Cupressus funebris); Camellia japonica cv.s; Lavalle's hawthorn (Crataegus x lavallei); golden elm (Ulmus hollandica 'Louis van Houttei' ); Abelia bifida; crepe myrtle (Lagerstroemia indica), Indian hawthorn (Raphiolepis indica); port wine magnolia (Michelia figo); golden elm (Ulmus glabra 'Lutescens' ); holly/holm/evergreen oak (Quercus ilex); two weeping wych elms (Ulmus glabra 'Pendula' ); and Chinese elm (Ulmus sinensis).

The sunken garden was formerly a duck pond. It is named the F. J. Mulholland Memorial Garden, commemorating a long serving Town Clerk. The aviary was built as a depression era project for regional development. Brolgas and emus were kept in the southern part of the park in the 1920s within a wire (fence). A superb collection of begonias is housed in the Blowes Conservatory (1934). A small lake (1890), ferneries (1938) and sunken gardens complete this well-maintained garden.

Structures

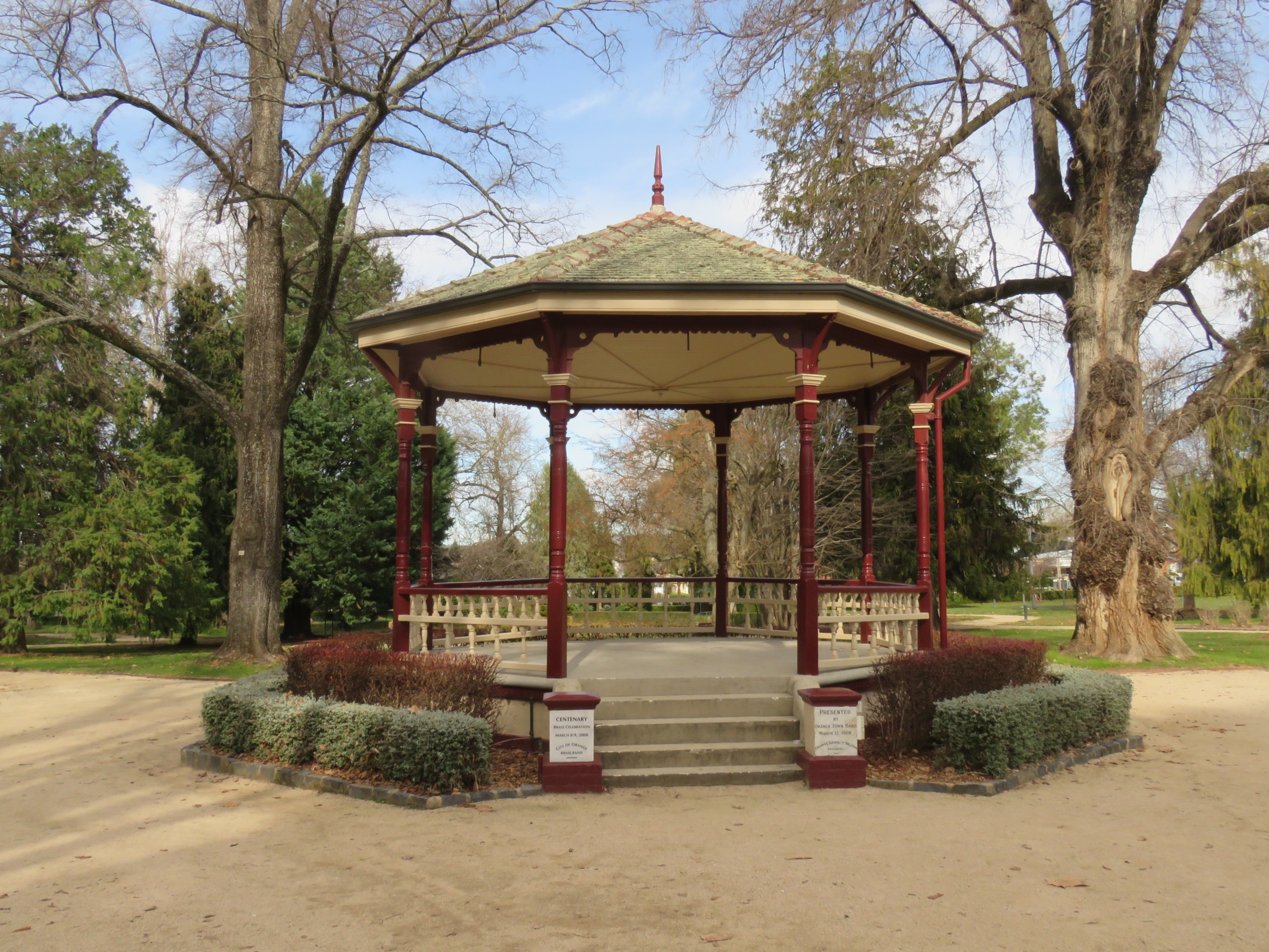
The 1908 Bandstand in 2026

- The Bandstand (1908) is octagonal, on a brick foundation. It has carved wooden pillars and railing, with a weatherboard ceiling. There is a carved wood frieze and the peaked roof is tiled. It contains the original gas fittings and music stands.
- The James Dalton Memorial fountain was donated by Dalton (a wealthy merchant who was part owner of the Dalton Brothers store in central Orange) in 1881. It is located on the central axial path, made of cast iron with water falling from a central pipe to three levels. Four boys with urns stand on an octagonal plinth embossed with Acanthus leaves. Above, the central piece is embellished with fern fronds which open to a flower-like urn upon which stand three storks. A further centre piece rises above these. The fountain was remodelled in the 1920s to its present condition.
- Other buildings include the Ferneries (1938, restored in 1988) which contain the John Gale Memorial fountain from the original bush-house. This is of cast iron in the form of three swans surmounted by a small dish at a higher level. Terracotta urns which were originally at the corners of the fountain now contain shrubs.
- The Blowes Conservatory (1934) was built to display, and still annually contains an outstanding collection of begonias, many of the original stock having come from Ballarat.
- There are two noteworthy sets of gates. The most impressive are the cast iron set on the Clinton-Summer Street corner. Erected in the 1890s. Those on the northwest corner, Campson-Summer Street are also cast iron, made by Dick Venerables of Parkes. Originally situated at Robertson Park, moved to their present site in 1927.
- The Lodge is in a fairly dilapidated condition, with hodge-podge additions. It was built around 1900 of sandstock and has a corrugated iron roof.
- The Frank Mulholland Memorial Garden was built in memory of Orange's Town Clerk from 1895-1935, on the site of the former sunken garden, retaining its form. The sunken garden and sundial were dedicated on 14 February 1938 by the Hon E. S. Spooner.
- There are many objects of interest including a bandstand (1908), fountains (one from 1891, one 1908-20), a parkman's lodge (c. 1890), conservatory (1934), fernery (1938), ponds (from 1890), aviaries (c. 1930), artillery pieces (1870 and 1917) and two fine sets of gates (one from the 1890s). There are also a number of park seats dating from the turn of the 20th century; at least two designs can be recognised from the 1908 guide. Some of these seats need correct restoration. This park has great significance for the people of Orange and tourists to the town.

=== Condition ===
As at 5 January 2009, the Lodge is in poor condition.

The park has over 200 trees, many in over-mature condition. Storms have led to damage and loss of over-mature trees, for instance lightning strikes on a mature English oak (Quercus robur).

=== Modifications and dates ===
The following modifications have been made to Cook Park:

- 1883–87 – Basic layout and plantings
- 1887+ – Majority of oldest plantings, formal layout
- 1890s – Lake built; gates added on Clinton/Summer Street
- 1891 – Fountain - later changed. c. 1900 lodge built
- 1920s – Fountain remodelled
- 1927 – A second set of gates were moved from Robertson Park to corner of Summer/Sampson Streets
- 1938 – New fernery and conservatory built. The John Gale memorial fountain was moved into the new fernery. The 1938 Memorial sunken garden was opened, it having formerly (c. 1890) been a lake/ duck pond. Bush house - removed
- 1985 – There was debate about the elm avenue's removal, due to problems with cavities and possums
- c. 1985 – The elm avenue was originally pollarded but has been "grown out"
- 1988 – The 1938 fernery was re-built as a bicentennial project. Privet trees (Ligustrum lucidum) have been removed as these are now considered weeds
- 2013/14 – Refurbishment of the Cook Park duck ponds
- 2015/16 – Restoration of Dalton Fountain in Cook Park
- 2017/18 – Restoration of Blowes Conservatory

=== Further information ===
LEP - park, fernery, blowes conservatory = state significant.

== Heritage listing ==
As at 16 June 2017, Cook Park is of state heritage significance as a fine example of the Victorian era public park. Situated adjacent to the town's main street, the park has outstanding mature plantings and many fine features. It was set aside as a public reserve in 1854 and the park was proclaimed in 1873. From the 1870s onwards an outstanding collection of exotic trees were planted which today are large, mature specimens. This collection includes, elms, oaks, lindens, poplars, redwoods, cypresses, firs, ash and walnuts, with two bunya pines and one Tasmanian blue gum. Cook Park is set out on a radial plan, with a system of paths radiating in the form of a Union Jack flag with crossing gravel paths set in fine lawns. These paths focus on many items of interest, including a bandstand (1908), fountains (from 1891), a parkman's lodge (c. 1890), conservatory (1934), fernery (1938), ponds (from 1890), aviaries (c. 1930), artillery pieces (1870 and 1917), and two fine sets of gates from the turn of the 20th century. The park has state significance expressed in intact depression era projects including the fernery, Blowes conservatory and the Frank Mulholland Memorial Garden.

Cook Park is an excellent example of a nineteenth century Victorian park. It maintains various elements from its establishment through to the present day including general formal layout, mature tree and shrub plantings, flower beds and built elements. It provides a focal point in Orange.

Cook Park was listed on the New South Wales State Heritage Register on 24 August 2018 having satisfied the following criteria.

The place is important in demonstrating the course, or pattern, of cultural or natural history in New South Wales.

Cook Park is of state heritage significance as a remaining highly intact example of a Victorian style park within a rural inland city. The Cook Park area, as a swamp and water hole was used as a camping ground for travellers heading west, originally known as "Cattle Dray Park" and was set aside from 1854 as a reserve. The park was named in 1873 after the centenary of Captain James Cook's arrival in Australia. The park has state significance expressed in intact depression era projects including the fernery, Blowes conservatory and the Frank Mulholland Memorial Garden.

The place is important in demonstrating aesthetic characteristics and/or a high degree of creative or technical achievement in New South Wales.

Cook Park is of state heritage significance as a highly intact Victorian style park with elements to its style and layout with a demonstrable Victorian aesthetic. The characteristics particular to Cook Park as a state significant Victorian park are the centrally located rotunda and fountain, Victorian caretakers cottage and propagating house, conservatory, fernery, duck ponds and sunken rose gardens. The Cook Park elements are highly intact and are exemplary of the interwar eras of development in the park. The remaining 1870 tree plantings from the initial group sent from the Sydney Botanic Gardens include rare and endangered species such as the Sequoias which are exceptionally rare. Elements of the park such as the Blowes Conservatory and fernery, which were constructed by local residents as a depression relief project, display a high degree of creative and technical achievement and contribute to the state significance of Cook Park.

The place has potential to yield information that will contribute to an understanding of the cultural or natural history of New South Wales.

Cook Park has state significance as an early reserve site and as such can yield ongoing and further information regarding the former layout of the early 1890s gardens and pathways. It also has significance as an aboriginal meeting place in association with swamps and camping ground for travellers, Cook Park holds Aboriginal archaeological potential within its grounds.

The place possesses uncommon, rare or endangered aspects of the cultural or natural history of New South Wales.

Cook Park contains a collection of rare mature exotic tree plantings from its 1890-1920 Victorian period and from the 1920-1940 development period. These trees possess a high degree of rarity in Australia as exotics and are particularly suited to the cool winter climate of Orange. As such the trees are not seen in many of the rural parks within NSW.

The place is important in demonstrating the principal characteristics of a class of cultural or natural places/environments in New South Wales.

Cook Park is part of a class of parks within rural NSW set as a passive recreation area within a rural city. Parks such as Robertson Park in Orange, Machattie Park in Bathurst, Queen Elizabeth Park in Lithgow, Belmore Park in Goulburn, Victoria Park in Dubbo and Robertson Park in Mudgee along with Cook Park are examples which represent a class within the region and NSW at large demonstrating principle characteristics congruent with each other. Such characteristics of the class include location within or close to the town centre, extensive exotic mature plantings, and central visual element such as rotunda/performance space, water feature/s, and fountain/memorial sculpture. The more formal Victorian parks of Machattie and Cook Parks contain the characteristic elements of the caretaker's cottage, fernery, propagating house, duck ponds, conservatory and highly decorative rotunda and fountain. Cook Park is highly intact in the NSW rural Victorian park typology with contributing Victorian elements, including a high integrity of remaining trees, monuments and built fabric and path layouts.

== See also ==
- Parks in New South Wales
