= Duntryleague =

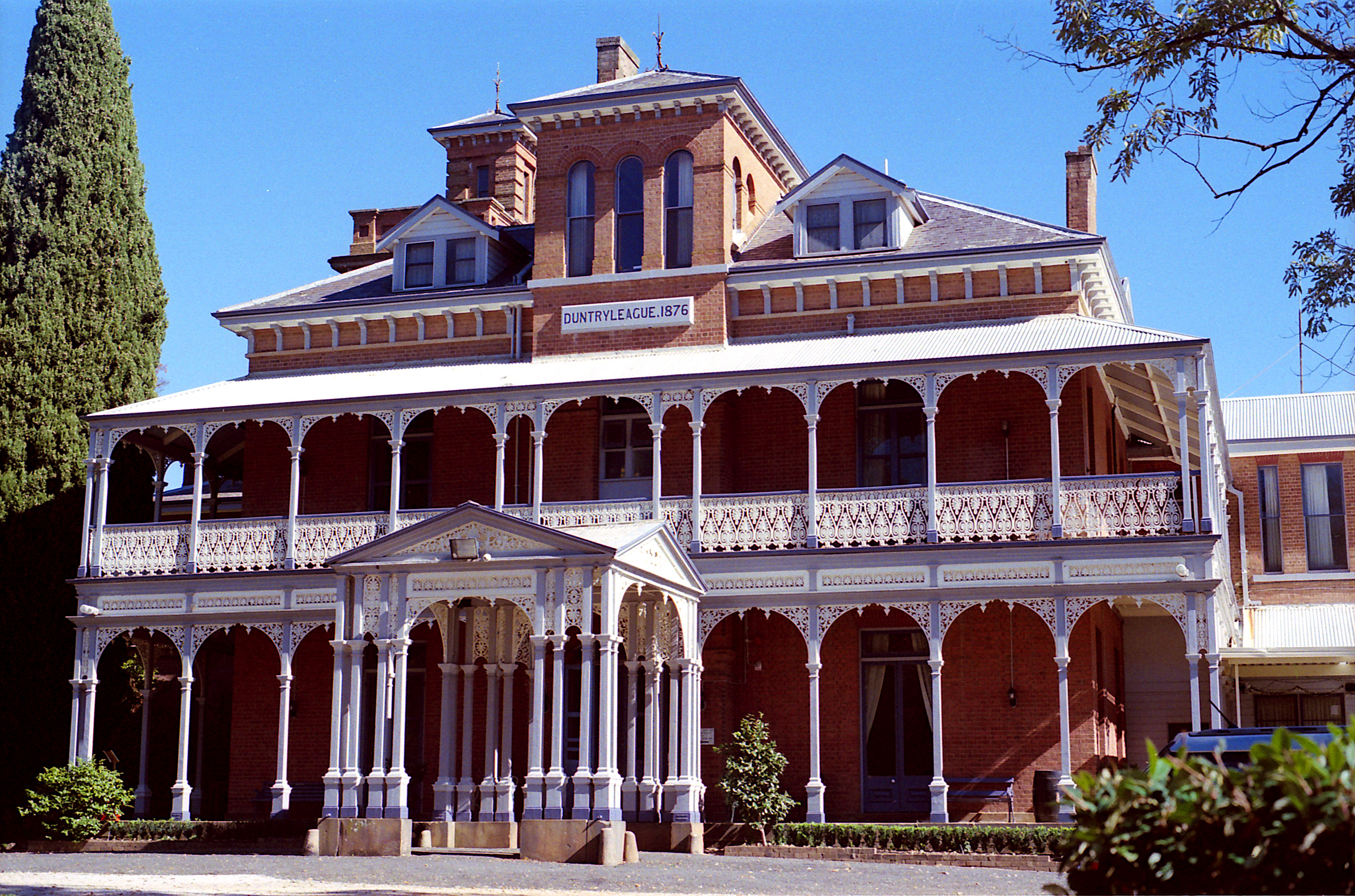
- Duntryleague in 2017

- Location within New South Wales Location within Australia
- 33°16′38″S 149°04′55″E
- Location: Woodward Road, Orange, New South Wales, Australia

History
- Built: 1875–1890

Site notes
- Architects: House: B. Backhouse; E. E. Fallick; S. van Breda; Grounds: A. Patterson; J. Irving; E. Apperly; I. Berzins
- Architectural style: Victorian Filigree
- Owner: The Orange Golf Club Ltd

New South Wales Heritage Register
- Official name: Duntryleague with Lodge, Park, Gates, Stables; Orange Golf Club
- Type: State heritage (landscape)
- Designated: 2 April 1999
- Reference no.: 318
- Type: Historic Landscape
- Category: Landscape – Cultural
- Builders: R. Scott; J. J. McMurtrie

Duntryleague is a heritage-listed former residential estate and now golf club house and course located at Woodward Road, Orange, New South Wales, Australia. It was built from 1875 to 1890. It is also known as Duntryleague with Lodge, Park, Gates, Stables and Orange Golf Club.

== History ==
In the 1820s surveyors of the interior of the New South Wales colony were required to select, survey and map out one mile square areas of land which were to be reserved for future villages as population numbers increased. In 1829 surveyor J. B. Richards reserved land for the town of Orange. This remained empty through the 1830s, although it was surrounded by three substantial land grants to Simeon Lord and Joseph Moulder (to the north, south and east of the reserve), and to the west to William Ealy Sampson. Sampson's 1836 of grant of 260 hectares (640 acres) contained the property which became known as Campdale, and this contained the property which later became Duntryleague. Sampson did not remain at Campdale, but settled in Mudgee.

By 1846 these three original grantees were already leasing some of their land and dividing other parts for sale. George Mills opened the Boree Inn about 100 metres (330 ft) to the west of Campdale's southwest corner on the main road boundary of Sampson's grant. This building was situated on land that later incorporated part of the Duntryleague property, and remained until it was demolished in the mid 20th century.

=== Dalton family ===
In 1847 James Dalton Senior opened a store at the village of Summerhill (a short distance from the site of the village of Orange). James Dalton was a shopkeeper, part-owner of the Dalton Brothers' Store, a prominent institution in the town of Orange, on its main street, Summer Street. Originally Dalton was from Galbally, County Limerick, Ireland. Initially he set up a store in an earlier settlement (before Orange was established) outside (east of the present) Orange. After the town of Orange was proclaimed in 1845, he began trading in the town on the corner of Post Office Lane in 1849, in a small store which was replaced by 1865 by the easternmost section of the present Myers store (formerly named Grace Bros, and originally named the Dalton Brothers Store). A second building was built in 1870 on the western side of the existing three-storey building, and the gap between the two was in-filled in 1895, forming a large general store. The Dalton Brothers boasted they could fit out a man with everything.

James lived at 70 Byng Street Orange, building a house there in 1860 where eleven of his twelve children were born.

By the 1850s Campdale had already been subdivided and continually leased, with a major part of the property being sold to the Flanagan family with Michael's daughters Emily, Henrietta and Margaret each owning a share. In 1851 gold was discovered in nearby Ophir. James Dalton Senior's store flourished with the passing miners. By this time he had also set up a "relatively substantial slab store" in the village of Blackman's Swamp (Orange) which he had built in 1849, 3 years after its gazettal.

In 1853 James Dalton Senior's store was established in Orange – he was just 19. During the gold rush of the 1850s Dalton's store bought gold, and gradually expanded to provide all necessary commodities: including the ironmongery and grocery departments of the Western Stores. During the mid 1850s James Dalton had acquired Spirits Licenses (although his father had already gained a license to sell liquor in his stores in 1851) and in 1853 became the proprietor of the Daniell O'Connor Inn in Byng Street, Orange.

In 1860 Orange incorporated as a city. During the 1860s it developed into a significant commercial centre including three flour mills, a foundry, three banks, 14 hotels and a daily coach mail service along the Great Western Highway. By 1864 the population had increased to over 1,000, rendering it eligible to become a borough with a mayor and 8 aldermen. One of those nominated to be amongst the first of the aldermen was James Dalton. By 1860 the Dalton Bros business was flourishing and a new building was erected on the Summer Street site. In 1861 the Dalton Bros opened a coffee mill in Orange, and James also built a steam flourmill on the corner of Summer and Sale Streets. This was a highly profitable venture and flour produced here won many international prizes for its quality.

By the 1870s Dalton Brothers' Stores had become the most significant merchant business in western NSW, with wool as a major commodity. Wool was brought to the Stores in Orange from farms by bullock teams and sent to Tarana in horse-drawn wagons, then to Sydney by rail. When the railway was extended west to Orange it was James Dalton who turned the first sod to commence work for the extension, and Thomas, as Orange's mayor, who officially opened the line in 1877.

In 1872 James Dalton began to acquire the 126 hectares (311 acres) of the original Campdale grant off the Flanagan family, which would become his Duntryleague property.

Between 1875 and 1879 Dalton consolidated ownership of 126 hectares (311 acres). In 1879 he applied for Torrens title before he commenced work on construction of his family residence. He named it Duntryleague after his birthplace in Ireland. As originally built, Duntryleague had no third-storey dormer windows (these were added later by James Dalton).

By the time James commenced building his home, the property extended across Forbes Road and as far as the Collins Orchard on the Molong Road. He engaged the well known architect Benjamin Backhouse to design the house. Backhouse designed many significant buildings in Queensland, New South Wales and Victoria, and had an office in Bathurst at the time. Local stonemasons Robert Scott and J. J. McMurtrie were responsible for the considerable amount of stonework in and around Duntryleague. The stone was quarried from Coffey Hill, 24 kilometres (15 mi) from Orange. The bricks were handmade on the property and laid by James Lindsay.

The family moved in 1876 into the newly completed house which was named after his Irish birthplace. The place Duntryleague in near Galbally in County Limerick, Ireland and means "the Fort of the three pillar stones". It refers to the burial of King Cormack, who was King of Munster in the 11th century. The original spelling was Doon-tri-liag.

At the time of its completion, the house was "said to rank among the finest in the colony" and "showed the vision and foresightedness of its owner." Included in the design was a family chapel and substantial central staircase into which Dalton had built the stained glass window which commemorated his investiture as a Papal Knight in recognition of his services to the Catholic Church. The window was presented to Dalton by Pope Gregory and carries his papal crest and motto, "Inter Cruces Triumphans in Cruces".

Several outbuildings were built on the estate, including two gate houses, on Forbes and Woodward Roads. The gatekeeper employed by Dalton, Leon Ravat, was a French vintner who made wines from the grapes grown in the extensive vineyards of the property. Irrigation was facilitated by a deep well and windmill that dew water from 27 metres (90 ft) below the ground.

The Banjo Patterson Memorial on the road off to Clifton Grove is one of the original gate posts of Duntryleague. Two inns were located on Duntryleague – the Coach & Horse Inn (later the Boree Inn) and the Limerick Castle.

By 1880 the property expanded to 141 hectares (349 acres) with the realignment of Cargo Road and subsequent purchase of this portion by James Dalton. When Dalton's children were grown he had other substantial homes built for them in the area, including the stately Kangaroobie and Ammerdown, among others. The Dalton Bros. firm had expanded to include warehouses and stores in Sydney – the large emporium Dalton House, in Pitt Street and Dalton Wharf at Millers Point. They began to acquire pastoral interests in the Orange area.

In c. 1885 Dalton employed Alfred Andrew Patterson (1859–1932) as a gardener at Duntryleague which had magnificent grounds. Through Dalton's influence Patterson became the inaugural gardener (in 1887) at Cook Park and was subsequently head gardener at Machattie Park, Bathurst, for twenty years of a formative period in its development.

1895 the grand new Dalton Brothers Emporium was opened on the original Store site in Summer Street, by now the Dalton Brothers had become renowned as one of the most important commercial enterprises in eastern Australia.

In 1901 Clover Hill, Orange Golf Club's first course, was officially opened (on a different site to Duntryleague). In 1906 land to north of Forbes Road transferred to ownership of the Dalton estate. In 1908 transferred back to James Dalton. During Dalton's ownership most of the native trees on the land were cleared and imported trees, primarily pines (Pinus spp.) had been planted along the drive, near the hose and along the Woodward Street boundary. While by far the majority of pines used were Monterey pine (P.radiata), other species are still on Duntryleague such as America's long-needled Southern pitch pine (P.palustris) on the entrance drive, Western yellow pine (P.ponderosa) and the stone pine (P.pinea) from the Mediterranean near the Pro-Golf Shop.

Much of the property had been used to grow feed for the Dalton's dairy cattle. The farm had also included a substantial orchard, a vegetable garden and a vineyard. To overcome the problems associated with flooding on the farm, the Daltons had constructed a drainage system of rubble drains in the paddock on the Woodward Street boundary. James Dalton lived at Duntryleague until his death in 1919. The property was left to his son Patrick Dalton who had become a Jesuit priest. James had wished that the house become a provincial Jesuit college, but this was rejected by the Bishop of Bathurst. Patrick's brother Michael who managed the Dalton Bros. Store moved in with his family. In 1928 Patrick Dalton and family returned to their home of Kangaroobie when Dalton Bros. was sold to Western Stores Ltd. Duntryleague stood empty for many years and the property was left under the management of a caretaker.

=== Alfred Andrew Patterson ===
Alfred Andrew Patterson, c. 1859–1932, a surveyor and gardener, was born in Drottningholm, Sweden and graduated from Uppsala University. Aged only 18 he was appointed lecturer at Hamburg University, Germany and afterwards left for England. He migrated to Australia, working variously as surveyor on the Mount Bischoff railway, Tasmania and the Nyngan-Byrock railway, interspersed with botanical collecting in Qld. Patterson was employed by Dalton who was MLA for Orange, probably at his property "Kangaroobie" and probably in 1885 as this is the year the NSW contingent left for the Sudan War, to which Patterson was travelling when put off the train in Orange, with typhoid. Following a severe illness he worked as a gardener for merchant James Dalton, at Duntryleague, Orange, an 1870s mansion set in magnificent grounds.

Through Dalton's influence he became the head gardener at Cook Park, Orange. When Cook Park was opened in 1887, he became the first head gardener, a position he held for three years. The site had been a swamp. An editorial in the Bathurst Times of 14 April 1890 noted that Patterson had "by dint of hard work and exercise of skill, brought Cook Park, Orange to its present state of perfection". In early 1890 a deputation from Bathurst, including Mayor Ald. Simmons and local MLA, W. H. Paul, went to Orange, ostensibly to examine the gravitational water supply scheme, and were taken to Cook Park where they met Patterson, and happened to mention Bathurst was seeking a Head Gardener to lay out the new Machattie Park in Bathurst and that a competition was first being held to find a design for the park. In March 1890 Bathurst Council advertised for a Head Gardener and in April Patterson was appointed. This caused some disquiet amongst the Aldermen of Orange. He was subsequently head gardener at Machattie Park, Bathurst, for 20 years of a formative period in its development. He spent the remainder of his career as a shire engineer in country NSW.

In 1900 and 1901 Patterson was seconded by the Government of New South Wales to organise the floral displays for the Federation celebrations in Centennial Park, Sydney and the arrival of the Duke and Duchess of York (the future King & Queen). Patterson published a regular gardening column in the Bathurst Daily Times and his reputation as a gardener flourished throughout the Central West of NSW.

=== Subdivision and development as a golf course ===
In 1929 land was resumed on the western boundary. In 1933–34, Duntryleague was subdivided by the family into the names of Michael Francis (eastern 73 hectares (180 acres)) and Thomas Dalton (western 50 hectares (124 acres)).

The most significant assistance to the pleasant environment of Orange given by sport has been the creation of Duntryleague Golf Club. The Presbyterian Church, though never dominant in Orange, brought golf to the town in the 1890s when the Revd. W. G. Maconochie with some Scots emigres, established a small, informal course on what is now Moulder Park. A club was formed in 1901 and the first official golf course, with sand greens, was created in the area of Bletchington, called Clover Hill, directly north of the town up to Kearney's Drive. Most of this area was sub-dividable and the club moved south east in 1919 to 32 hectares (80 acres) outside the town on the Icely Road, opposite the present Canobolas High School. The clubhouse of 1924–5 at Icely Road, a very good example of its kind, still survives as a spacious residence.

The decisive move came in 1935 when the Catholic Church decided to sell the entire Duntryleague estate of 180 acres, including the mansion (which had come into church hands through Father Patrick Dalton, a Jesuit, who had inherited the land from his father James in 1919). An exceedingly shrewd case was made in a pamphlet distributed to the golf club members when they met to discuss the desirability of purchasing Duntryleague and ways and means to raise the $50,000 needed for the purchase ($24,000) and expenses of creating a course and converting the mansion to a hotel. The pamphlet stressed the tourist value of such a facility.

The Duntryleague estate golf course dominates the Western approaches to the town with its old mansion, drive and magnificent trees.

So despite the depression, the money was raised by a bank loan, individual debentures and the subdivision over a period of 40 acres at the west end of the estate.

The creation of Duntryleague Golf Course in 1935–36 has both conserved and modified the environment in this highly important space just to the west of the main town. On the one hand, the land was saved from subdivision, most of the Dalton's exotic trees planted in the 1880s and 1890s were preserved and the superb house, along with its large stables and its original Woodward Street lodge and gateway, was maintained in remarkably intact condition. The Daltons' complex system of rubble drains laid on the east section of the estate was, moreover, rediscovered in the 1950s, cleaned out and put to efficient use to drain the second, sixth and eighth fairways.

On the other hand, much of the 2.6 meter high hedge which passed the 16th green has been largely cut away; the Daltons' orchard (in the area including the practice green, 13th tee and 18th green) was gradually removed and its last mulberries dug out in 1975; and the original vegetable garden near the 9th green has also gone.

1935 Michael Francis Dalton's eastern 73 hectares (180 acres) were purchased by the Orange Golf Club from the Catholic Church. An area of 16 hectares (40 acres) on the Cargo Road side was divided into 20-metre (66 ft) building blocks and sold to provide revenue for repayment of the club's bank loan. The Orange Golf Club had been inaugurated in 1901, when James Dalton had struck the first ball at the original course at Clover Hill, near Orange Base Hospital. In 1919 the club moved from Clover Hill to a new site at Icely Road opposite the present Canobolas Rural Technology High School, setting up a 12-hole golf course on 32 hectares (80 acres). The course here was small and quite rugged with steep slopes and rocky outcrops. By 1935 the club members felt it was unsuitable and sought a new location.

Under the club's ownership the last traces of Daltons' farming activities were gradually removed as the golf course was constructed. The course had originally been designed in 1935 by the club's professional John Irving, who drew up plans. These were modified and their implementation supervised by prominent golf course architect Eric Apperly, a prolific designer at the time who designed golf courses in NSW including The Lakes, Pymble, Manly and Newcastle. The Eric Apperly Shield Competition is named in his honour.

In 1935–36 architects E. E. Fallick and S. C. van Breda were employed to design additions to the mansion, now a guest house and to design a new clubhouse. This was intended to enhance Orange's attractiveness as a tourist destination. A two-storey wing was added to the mansion's northern side. On the top storey this included additional bedrooms for the guesthouse and the ground floor became the clubhouse, consisting of assembly room, bar, locker room, kitchen and small office. Four tennis courts were built to the north of the clubhouse.

All the handsome trees on the course do not belong to the Dalton period. The fine stand of Atlantic cedars (Cedrus atlantica) behind the 8th green were planted by Tom Hood in 1936.

When the club bought Duntryleague it contained, as well as the mansion, four other dwellings. Three were demolished – the old inn in 1938 and two others in 1966 and 1973. The remaining dwelling is the original gate keeper's cottage located at the Woodward Street Gates, which was the main entrance to Duntryleague. This is a mid Victorian brick residence with a slate roof and some decorative timberwork. It became the rent-free home of the club professional, John Irving. Since that time it has been occupied by staff of the club.

In 1936 the guesthouse was leased by Mrs Wallen. In 1938 the old inn on the property was demolished. In 1939 the windmill which had pumped water from a well to the house was disposed of, and bores sunk from which water was pumped to irrigate the golf course. From 1942 to 1946 Mrs Wallen was given permission to sublet the guesthouse to the Red Cross Society "for the duration of the war and six months thereafter". Duntryleague was used as a convalescent depot, staffed by the Red Cross until 15 January 1946. In 1946, on termination of the Red Cross' lease of the guesthouse, the Golf Club took over its running.

In 1947 an ex army "hut" 24.4 by 5.8 metres (80 by 19 ft) was purchased and reconstructed as an addition to the clubhouse (lower floor of the north wing addition). A bowling green was constructed and officially opened on 11 October 1947. The club became affiliated with the NSW Bowling Association, an affiliation that was later ended. The guesthouse was again leased, to Mrs Rhea.

In 1949 the club engaged landscape architect Ilmar Berzins to undertake a master plan of the course, setting out the existing tree species and specifying future plantings. The fairways were planted with African couch, a drought-resistant grass. Berzins supervised the planting himself, and after he had taken up employment in Sydney, continued to make an annual trip to Orange to supervise planting until it had progressed to a point where he could allow its continuation under the direction of a greenkeeper. Among the species planted were Atlantic cedars (Cedrus atlantica & C.a.'Glauca'), claret ash (Fraxinus oxycarpa 'Raywood'), Prunus spp., Japanese maples (Acer palmatum), copper beech (Fagus sylvatica 'Purpurea') and golden elms (Ulmus x hollandica 'Louis van Houttei') strategically sited. By 1975's end approximately 12,000 trees and shrubs had been planted on the course. The course had undergone major extensions between 1950 and 1975.

The Berzins plan has been followed out.

In 1953 architect Colin Brewster was commissioned to design extensions to the army hut, which were undertaken that year. The old hut was pushed west and became the Professional's shop (previously housed in the old hexagonal building). A new lounge was built to replace the Army Hut. A two-roomed office and vestibule with entrance steps and members' locker room were built on the western end of this new building. In 1954 the vegetable garden once used by the Daltons was replaced by a practice green.

In 1956 Mrs Rhea sold her lease of the guesthouse to Mr W. Doherty. A club flagpole was erected in memory of L. M. Brennan. In 1960 a halfway house (Gawler's Folly) was built. About this time a verandah was built adjacent to the upstairs dining room of the clubhouse. A new fence was constructed along the property's boundary with the Orange High School. In 1961 the guesthouse lease was taken over by Mr and Mrs H Gear, who at their own expense converted a number of rooms into bathrooms and toilets. These were designed by architect Fred Nolan. In 1963 corrugated iron garages located near the stables were demolished – previously these had been used by members for parking. In 1964 extensions to the clubhouse were made. The members' bar was enlarged by twice its size and turned into a U shape. A roof was put over the verandah adjacent to the upstairs dining room. A skillion was added to the old stables building, now used to store machinery, to increase garage space. A practice net was erected behind the pro's shop.

c. 1966 architect R Greene was commissioned to draw up plans for further additions to the clubhouse, retaining its single storey nature and lounge room, moving the entrance to the south side of the building, adding a billiards room. The contract went to local firm Gregory and Macleod. The present parking area for the club was constructed then also. One of the original dwellings on the property (situated to the right of the second green) was demolished. The Himalayan cedars (C.deodara) marking the border with Orange High School in the south were planted in 1966 by Miss Edith Robinson. The landscape architect and nurseryman Paul Sorensen and his son Ib were involved, doing a design for the Golf Club using nurse trees. This was by then standard practice of the Sorensens in landscapes particularly in the harsher climates of the Blue Mountains and Southern Highlands, and Ib was a great believer in this practice. At Duntryleague their nurse trees were supposed to be pulled out (later) but this did not occur – the huge pines have ruined the finer trees.

In 1972 the old building on the right of the fairway was demolished. The clumps of flowering cherries were given in 1974-5 by Neville Hawke. Altogether some 15,000 trees and shrubs have been planted at Duntryleague by the golf club, supplementing the pines, elms, monkey puzzle (actually it is a bunya pine, (Araucaria bidwillii), not a monkey puzzle) and redwoods of the 19th century. In 1975 the last remaining trees of the Dalton's former orchard were removed. Approximately 12,000 trees have by now been planted by the Golf Club. In 1976 the club celebrated the centenary of Duntryleague with a week long programme of festivities. Duntryleague was listed on the Register of the National Estate.

In 1980 Orange Golf Club sold portions on southern boundary for Orange High School and new residential development, leaving 57 hectares (140 acres). In 1981 financial assistance from the NSW Heritage Council was sought to paint and do exterior maintenance of the guesthouse, gate house and front gates. Between 1982 and 1985 the clubhouse was refurbished, including the dining room, a new bar was installed, recarpeting the bar and the Brennan Room's dance floor, refurbishing the guesthouse including bedrooms with period furniture, new carpet and modernised facilities. The guesthouse kitchen was renovated. Designers Cairncross, Scheer & Associates were responsible for the work. Five blocks of land on the property were sold to help finance improvements. In 1984 Duntryleague was made subject to a Permanent Conservation Order under the NSW Heritage Act. This was transferred onto the NSW State Heritage Register on its creation with amendment of the legislation in 1998.

In 2002 architect Christo Aitken was engaged to assist with grant funding and to prepare a conservation management plan for the property.

== Description ==
=== Grounds / Golf Course ===
Duntryleague is sited on the top of a hill among magnificent trees.

In 1875–79 holdings comprised 126 hectares (311 acres). Several outbuildings were built on the estate, including two gate houses, on Forbes and Woodward Roads. The gatekeeper employed by Dalton, Leon Ravat, was a French vintner who made wines from the grapes grown in the extensive vineyards of the property. Irrigation was facilitated by a deep well and windmill that dew water from 90 feet below the ground.

The Banjo Patterson Memorial on the road to Clifton Grove is one of the original gate posts of Duntryleague.

In 1880 the property expanded to 141 hectares (349 acres) with the realignment of Cargo Road and subsequent purchase of this portion. In c. 1885 Dalton employed Alfred Andrew Patterson (1859–1932) as a gardener at Duntryleague which had magnificent grounds. Through Dalton's influence Patterson became the inaugural gardener (in 1887) at Cook Park, Orange and was subsequently head gardener at Machattie Park, Bathurst, for 20 years of a formative period in its development.

In 1906 land to north of Forbes Road transferred to ownership of the Dalton estate. During Dalton's ownership most of the native trees on the land were cleared and imported trees, primarily pines (Pinus spp.) had been planted along the drive, near the hose and along the Woodward Street boundary. While by far the majority of pines used were Monterey pine (P.radiata), other species are still on Duntryleague such as America's long-needled Southern pitch pine (P.palustris) on the entrance drive, Western yellow pine (P.ponderosa), longleaf pine (P.palustris) and the stone pine (P.pinea) from the Mediterranean near the Pro-Golf Shop. Much of the property had been used to grow feed for the Dalton's dairy cattle. The farm had also included a substantial orchard, a vegetable garden and a vineyard. To overcome the problems associated with flooding on the farm, the Daltons had constructed a drainage system of rubble drains in the paddock on the Woodward Street boundary.

In 1935 Michael Francis Dalton's eastern 73 hectares (180 acres) were purchased by the Orange Golf Club from the Catholic Church. Under the club's ownership the last traces of Daltons' farming activities were gradually removed as the golf course was constructed. The course had originally been designed in 1935 by the club's professional John Irving. His plans were modified and their implementation supervised by prominent golf course architect Eric Apperly.

In 1949 the club engaged landscape architect Ilmar Berzins to undertake a master plan of the course, setting out the existing tree species and specifying future plantings. The fairways were planted with African couch, a drought-resistant grass. Berzins supervised the planting himself, and after he had taken up employment in Sydney, continued to make an annual trip to Orange to supervise planting until it had progressed to a point where he could allow its continuation under the direction of a greenkeeper.

The creation of Duntryleague Golf Course in 1935-6 has both conserved and modified the environment in this highly important space just to the west of the main town. On the one hand, the land was saved from subdivision, most of the Dalton's exotic trees planted in the 1880s and 1890s were preserved and the superb house, along with its large stables and its original Woodward Street lodge and gateway, was maintained in remarkably intact condition. The Daltons' complex system of rubble drains laid on the east section of the estate was, moreover, rediscovered in the 1950s, cleaned out and put to efficient use to drain the second, sixth and eighth fairways.

On the other hand, much of the 2.6-metre (8 ft 6 in) high hedge which passed the 16th green has been largely cut away; the Daltons' orchard (in the area including the practice green, 13th tee and 18th green) was gradually removed and its last mulberries dug out in 1975; and the original vegetable garden near the 9th green has also gone.

All the handsome trees on the course do not belong to the Dalton period. The fine stand of Atlantic cedars (Cedrus atlantica) behind the 8th green were planted by Tom Hood in 1936 and in 1950 a landscape architect, Ilmar Berzins, prepared a master plan for tree planting. The Berzins plan has been followed out and the course contains many Atlantic cedars (Cedrus atlantica and C.a.'Glauca'), claret ashes (Fraxinus oxycarpa 'Raywood'), flowering cherries (Prunus x serrulata cv.s), Japanese maples (Acer palmatum cv.s), copper beeches (Fagus sylvatica 'Purpurea') and golden elms (Ulmus x hollandica 'Lutescens') strategically sited. The Himalayan cedars (C.deodara) marking the border with Orange High School in the south were planted in 1966 by Miss Edith Robinson and the clumps of flowering cherries were given in 1974-5 by Neville Hawke. Altogether some 15,000 trees and shrubs have been planted at Duntryleague by the golf club, supplementing the pines, elms, "monkey puzzle" (actually it is a bunya pine, Araucaria bidwillii, not a monkey puzzle) and redwoods of the 19th century.

The first trees were planted on Duntryleague Golf Course, then a treeless cropping and dairy property, in the late 1930s, under the instruction of Tom Hood but most were planted in the 1950s under the direction of Ilmar Berzins. By 1980 about 12,000 trees and shrubs had been planted (estimate from 'The History of Duntryleague 1876-1986') with the help of Jack Wetzler, Dennis Mullen and many others. Overall, 130 varieties, mainly trees have been identified but a number of shrub species have not been included (in the book "The Trees of Duntryleague Golf Course" by Armstrong & Mullen, 2008, 3). Among the species planted were Atlantic cedars (Cedrus atlantica & C.a.'Glauca'), claret ash (Fraxinus oxycarpa 'Raywood') Japanese maples (Acer palmatum), copper beech (Fagus sylvatica 'Purpurea') and golden elms (Ulmus x hollandica 'Louis van Houttei'). By 1975's end approximately 12,000 trees and shrubs had been planted on the course. The course had undergone major extensions between 1950 and 1975.

Significant older, or larger specimens, and rare or unusual species include:

- 1st tee: redwood (Sequoiadendron giganteum, Mediterranean cypress (Cupressus sempervirens), linden (Tilia europaea), coastal redwood (Sequoia sempervirens), Ponderosa or Western yellow pine (Pinus ponderosa);
- 2nd tee: incense cedar (Calocedrus decurrens); Himalayan or deodar cedar (Cedrus deodara);
- 4th tee: Antarctic beech (Nothofagus sp.), southern blue gums (Eucalyptus bicostata); 4th-5th tee: maidenhair tree (Ginkgo biloba);
- 5th tee: blue spruce (Picea pungens), silk tree (Albizzia julibrissen), coastal redwoods;
- 8th tee: pin oaks (Quercus palustris) – fine specimens, large, blue Atlas cedar (Cedrus atlantica 'Glauca');
- 9–10th tee: rare species of strawberry tree (Arbutus andrachnoides) (another older one is near the Woodward St. gate house); 10th tee: a 1.5m diameter trunked Himalayan or deodar cedar, a lone pine (Pinus brutia) commemorating the Anzacs, carob bean (Ceratonia siliqua);
- 13th tee: Japanese cedar/ tsugi, (Cryptomeria japonica), golden chain tree, (Laburnum × watereri 'Vossii';
- 15th tee: linden species with larger leaves than Tilia europaea – Tilia sp.;
- 16th tee: coastal redwoods, 2 dawn redwoods (Taxodium distichum), holly/holm/evergreen oak (Quercus ilex), guava (Psidium sp.), giant redwood;
- 18th tee: Mexican pine (Pinus patula), incense cedar, stone pine (Pinus pinea) – large mature specimen

Duntryleague has a considerable collection of mature exotic trees. The main entrance drive off Woodward Street in particular is richly planted from the gate house up to the mansion, as is the area around the mansion, with a mixture of conifers, evergreen and deciduous trees.

Going from the mansion down the drive these include: English elms (Ulmus procera) (lots), Wellingtonia/big tree (Sequoiadendron giganteum), Coastal redwood (Sequoia sempervirens), Himalayan or deodar cedars (Cedrus deodara) (lots), blue Atlas cedars (C.atlantica 'Glauca'), Monterey pines (Pinus radiata) (lots), Photinia glabra, linden (Tilia cordata), Mediterranean cypresses (Cupressus sempervirens) (lots), Monterey cypresses (C.macrocarpa) (lots), strawberry tree (Arbutus unedo), laurustinus (Viburnum tinus), English oak (Quercus robur), Bhutan cypress (C.torulosa), Rhododendron spp., cherry laurels (Prunus laurocerasus), Arizona cypress (C.glabra), golden chain tree (Laburnum anagyroides), Meyer's juniper (Juniperus squamata 'Meyeri'), ashes (Fraxinus excelsior), Tasmanian blue gum (Eucalyptus globulus).

Behind the gate house is a large specimen of Osmanthus (O.heterophyllus / H.aquifolium) about 8 m tall – specimens this large are rare. Also nearby is a rare species of strawberry tree (Arbutus andrachnoides). Near the gate house is a hedge of Photinia glabra and 2 large Western Yellow pine (Pinus ponderosa) and another hedge of privet (Ligustrum ovalifolium).

On the southern side of the drive are a number of young Himalayan or deodar cedars, next to the school grounds.

North of the mansion are four tennis courts (earthen), netted, on two terraces, edged by Cotoneaster sp. hedges. Steps in brick lead down the terraces to the courts.

Other old plantings north of the mansion include lindens, English oak (several), incense cedar (Calocedrus decurrens) (3), a bunya pine (Araucaria bidwillii), strawberry tree, Cupressus sp., Himalayan cedar, English elms, hazelnuts (Corylus avellana cv.s) (several), and a carob (Ceratonia siliqua). These could be remnant plantings of a Dalton era orchard. Other plantings north of the mansion include: tree tulip (Magnolia soulangeana), grape holly (Mahonia lomariifolia), Photinia glabra, Bhutan cypresses, silver birches (Betula pendula), ashes, copper beech (Fagus sylvatica 'Purpurea'), Wellingtonia/big trees, pin oaks (Quercus palustris), blue spruces (Picea pungens 'Glauca'), bunya pine, flowering peach (Prunus persica cv.), Arizona cypress, Portuguese laurel (Prunus lusitanica), tarata/lemonwood (Pittosporum eugenioides).

West of the mansion are old stone pines (Pinus pinea), English elms (several), a Japanese black pine (P.thunbergii), ashes, cherry laurel (remnant of an old hedge?), English oaks (3), Arizona cypress, Mediterranean cypresses (2, in axial arrangement near a path), New Zealand cabbage tree (Cordyline australis) in a car parking area.

The golf course at least near the mansion is predominantly planted with Monterey pines (P.radiata), Lombardy poplars (Populus nigra 'Italica') and golden willows (Salix matsudana 'Aurea').

1980s plantings in the grounds and golf course include blue Atlas cedars, bottlebrushes (Callistemon spp.), golden Japanese laurel (Euonymus japonicus 'Aureo-Variegata'), red and Mexican hawthorns (Crataegus oxycantha and C.mexicana), flowering cherries (Prunus serrulata cv.s), golden Himalayan cedars (Cedrus deodara 'Aurea'), variegated tarata/lemonwood (Pittosporum eugenioides 'Variegata'), golden Monterey cypresses, strawberry trees and coastal redwoods.

=== Mansion/Clubhouse ===
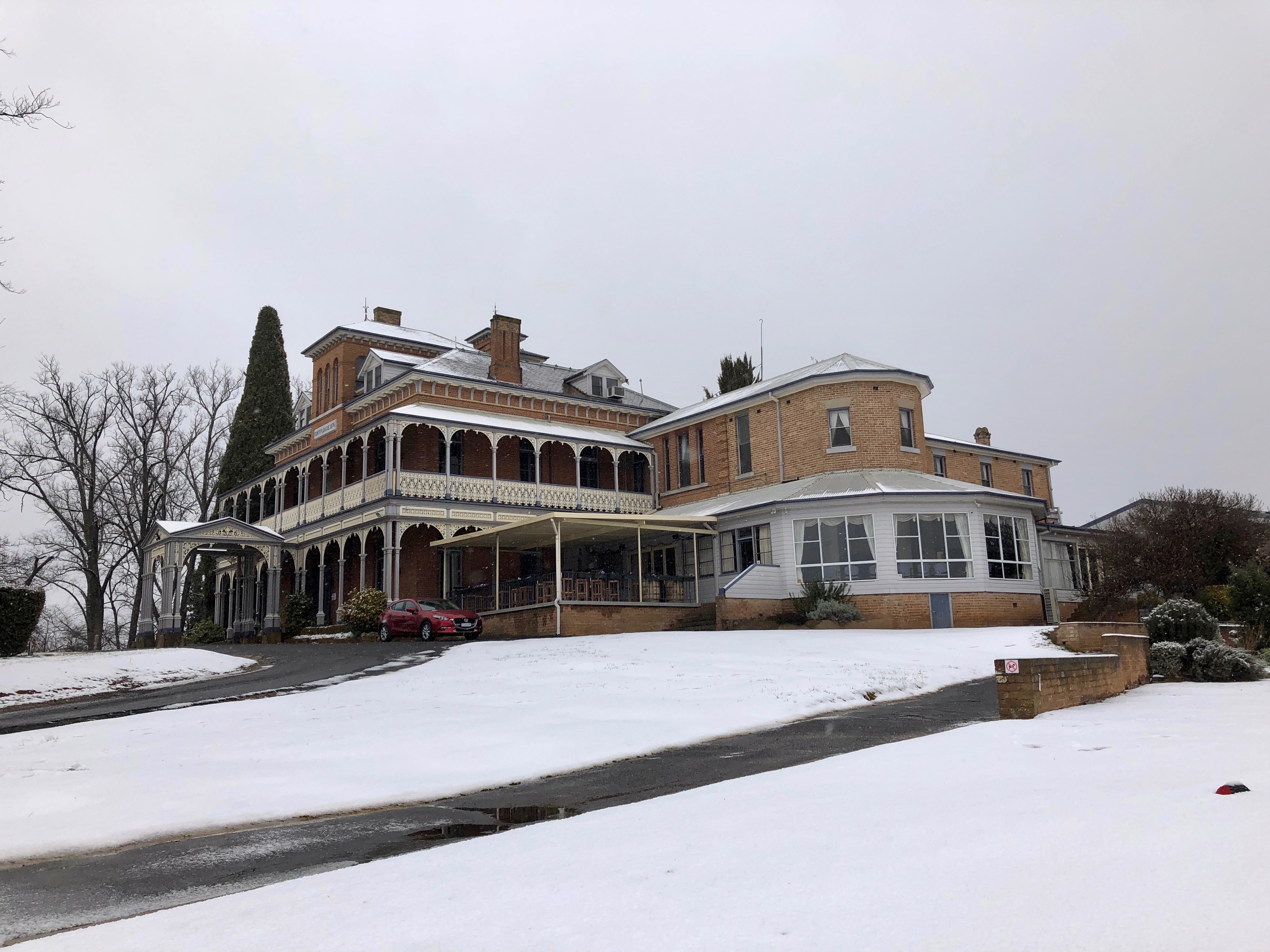
Duntryleague Guesthouse and Golf Club in winter 2019

Built in 1876, designed by Benjamin Backhouse, an example of mid Victorian era Filigree style, with high standards of construction and craftsmanship in joinery and ironwork. A three-storey house of hand-made sandstock bricks in multi-bond and at the rear are two storeyed wings with splayed corners.

The predominant feature of the front facade is a portico and a double storey verandah which returns down the sides. The square cast iron posts of the portico and verandas were made by Fletcher Brothers of Park Street, Sydney, and the verandah have ornate cast-iron lace to the balustrades and brackets. There is also ornate lace to the gables, brackets and frieze of the portico which has multiple columns to each corner.

The verandah floor is flagged with large blocks of sandstone, and the vestibule is tiled.

There are two decorative towers and a square tower room in centre front which was the original chapel. The two asymmetrically placed towers are skyline features and have rusticated quoins. In the front centre of the upper floor is a square tower room with round arched windows; this was the original chapel.

On either side dormer windows (later additions) are set into the slate, hipped roof. Eaves are bracketed, which, with the towers, gives the house an Italianate feel. An elongated double front door is flanked by stained glass reveals and a fanlight.

Inside, there are fourteen foot ceilings in all rooms. An elaborately carved cedar staircase, very wide and generous was created by Richard Albon of Sydney with barley sugar balusters dominates the central hall. A large stained glass window on its first landing was presented to James Dalton when he was invested as a papal knight in 1877. The stair finishes at the top with a stained glass skylight in the form of a small tower with finial on the roof.

There are three marble fireplaces. The dining and drawing rooms are divided by an arch with cedar fitted panelled folding doors. Present kitchen has marble floor and was the dairy. Addition on north side of house is of similar brick and is not offensive. There also have been added four dormer windows on top floor.

=== Duntryleague Gate-keeper's Lodge ===
At the entrance to the drive stands the gatekeeper's lodge which has a gabled, patterned slate roof with decorative bargeboards and tall, corbelled chimneys. The lodge has decorative traceried bargeboards, a patterned slate roof and tall, corbelled chimneys. To the rear of the main gabled section is a skillion, and at the front is a small, corrugated iron roofed verandah. Walling is apparently brick. The building is protected from Woodward Road by an elegantly curved cast-iron fence and there are mature trees close by. Duntryleague's brick stables are some distance away.

=== Stables ===
Further away (south-west of the house) are the stables which are built of sandstock brick with an iron roof.

=== Modifications and dates ===
The following modifications have been made to the house and surrounds:

- 1836 – Sampson's grant of 260 hectares (640 acres) contained the property which became known as Campdale.
- 1872 – James Dalton began acquiring 126 hectares (311 acres) of the Campdale grant, which would become Duntryleague.
- 1875–79 – 126 hectares (311 acres) – ownership consolidation by Dalton. In 1879 he commenced construction of his family residence. Included was a family chapel and substantial central staircase. Several outbuildings were built on the estate, including two gate houses, on Forbes and Woodward Roads. The gatekeeper was a French vintner who made wines from the grapes grown in the extensive vineyards of the property. Irrigation was facilitated by a deep well and windmill that dew water from 90 feet below the ground.
- 1880 – property expanded to 141 hectares (349 acres) with realignment of Cargo Road and subsequent purchase of this portion. As originally built, Duntryleague had no third-storey dormer windows (these were added later by James Dalton). The stained glass window on the upper level (set behind an archway) was presented to James Dalton, on his becoming a papal Knight, by Pope Gregory and carried his Papal crest and motto "Inter Cruces Triumphans in Cruces". This motto is repeated in the lead light above the front door of the mansion.
- 1906 – land to north of Forbes Road transferred to ownership of the Dalton estate. Most of the native trees on the land were cleared and imported trees, primarily pines (Pinus spp.) had been planted along the drive, near the hose and along the Woodward Street boundary. While by far the majority of pines used were Monterey pine (P.radiata), other species are still on Duntryleague such as America's long-needled Southern pitch pine (P.palustris) on the entrance drive, Western yellow pine (P.ponderosa) and the stone pine (P.pinea) from the Mediterranean near the Pro-Golf Shop. Much of the property had been used to grow feed for the Dalton's dairy cattle. The farm had also included a substantial orchard, a vegetable garden and a vineyard. To overcome the problems associated with flooding on the farm, the Daltons had constructed a drainage system of rubble drains in the paddock on the Woodward Street boundary.
- 1929 – land resumed on the western boundary.
- 1933/34 – Duntryleague subdivided into names of Michael Francis (eastern 73 hectares (180 acres)) and Thomas Dalton (western 50 hectares (124 acres))
- 1935 – Michael Francis Dalton's eastern 73 hectares (180 acres) purchased by the Orange Golf Club from the Catholic Church. An area of 16 hectares (40 acres) on the Cargo Road side was divided into 20-metre (66 ft) building blocks and sold to provide revenue for repayment of the club's bank loan. Under the club's ownership the last traces of Daltons' farming activities were gradually removed as the golf course was constructed. The course had originally been designed in 1935 by the club's professional John Irving. These were modified and their implementation supervised by prominent golf course architect Eric Apperly.
- 1935–36 – additions to the mansion, now a guest house and a new clubhouse. A two-storey wing was added to the mansion's northern side. On the top storey this included additional bedrooms for the guesthouse and the ground floor became the clubhouse, consisting of assembly room, bar, locker room, kitchen and small office. Four tennis courts were built to the north of the clubhouse. When the club bought Duntryleague it contained, as well as the mansion, four other dwellings. Three were demolished – the old inn in 1938 and two others in 1966 and 1973. The fourth is the existing gate house inside the Woodward Street entrance.
- 1938 – old inn on the property demolished.
- 1939 – the windmill which had pumped water from a well to the house was disposed of, and bores sunk from which water was pumped to irrigate the golf course. The creation of Duntryleague Golf Course in 1935-6 has both conserved and modified the environment. On the one hand, the land was saved from subdivision, most of the Dalton's exotic trees planted in the 1880s and 1890s were preserved and the superb house, along with its large stables and its original Woodward Street lodge and gateway, was maintained in remarkably intact condition. The Daltons' complex system of rubble drains laid on the east section of the estate was, moreover, rediscovered in the 1950s, cleaned out and put to efficient use to drain the second, sixth and eighth fairways. On the other hand, much of the 2.6-metre (8 ft 6 in) high hedge which passed the 16th green has been largely cut away; the Daltons' orchard (in the area including the practice green, 13th tee and 18th green) was gradually removed and its last mulberries dug out in 1975; and the original vegetable garden near the 9th green has also gone. All the handsome trees on the course do not belong to the Dalton period. The fine stand of Atlantic cedars (Cedrus atlantica) behind the 8th green were planted by Tom Hood in 1936 and in 1950 a landscape architect, Ilmar Berzins, prepared a master plan for tree planting. The Berzins plan has been followed out and the course contains many Atlantic cedars, claret ashes, Prunus, Japanese maples, copper beeches and golden elms strategically sited. The Himalayan cedars (C.deodara) marking the border with Orange High School in the south were planted in 1966 by Miss Edith Robinson and the clumps of flowering cherries were given in 1974-5 by Neville Hawke. Altogether some 15,000 trees and shrubs have been planted at Duntryleague by the golf club, supplementing the pines, elms, monkey puzzle (actually it is a bunya pine, Araucaria bidwillii, not a monkey puzzle (S.Read, pers.comm.)) and redwoods of the 19th century.
- 1947 – an ex army "hut" 24.4 by 5.8 metres (80 ft × 19 ft) was purchased and reconstructed as an addition to the clubhouse (lower floor of the north wing addition). A bowling green was constructed.
- 1949 – the Club engaged landscape architect Ilmar Berzins to undertake a masterplan of the course, setting out the existing tree species and specifying future plantings. The fairways were planted with African couch, a drought-resistant grass. Berzins supervised the planting himself, and after he had taken up employment in Sydney, continued to make an annual trip to Orange to supervise planting until it had progressed to a point where he could allow its continuation under the direction of a greenkeeper. Among the species planted were Atlantic cedars (Cedrus atlantica & C.a.'Glauca'), claret ash (Fraxinus oxycarpa 'Raywood') Japanese maples (Acer palmatum), copper beech (Fagus sylvatica 'Purpurea') and golden elms (Ulmus x hollandica 'Louis van Houttei'). By 1975's end approximately 12,000 trees and shrubs had been planted on the course. The course had undergone major extensions between 1950 and 1975.
- 1953 – extensions to the army hut were undertaken. The old hut was pushed west and became the Professional's shop (previously housed in the old hexagonal building). A new lounge was built to replace the Army Hut. A two-roomed office and vestibule with entrance steps and members' locker room were built on the western end of this new building.
- 1954 – the vegetable garden once used by the Daltons was replaced by a practice green.
- 1956 – a club flagpole was erected in memory of L. M. Brennan.
- 1960 – a halfway house ('Gawler's Folly') was built. About this time, a verandah was built adjacent to the upstairs dining room of the clubhouse. A new fence was constructed along the property's boundary with the Orange High School.
- 1961 – the guesthouse lease was taken over by Mr and Mrs H Gear, who at their own expense converted a number of rooms into bathrooms and toilets. These were designed by architect Fred Nolan.
- 1963 – corrugated iron garages located near the stables were demolished – previously these had been used by members for parking.
- 1964 – extensions to the clubhouse were made. The members' bar was enlarged by twice its size and turned into a U shape. A roof was put over the verandah adjacent to the upstairs dining room. A skillion was added to the old stables building, now used to store machinery, to increase garage space. A practice net was erected behind the pro's shop.
- c. 1966 – architect Mr R. Greene was commissioned to draw up plans for further additions to the clubhouse, retaining its single storey nature and lounge room, moving the entrance to the south side of the building, adding a billiards room. The contract went to local firm Gregory and Maclead. The present parking area for the club was constructed then also. One of the original dwellings on the property (situated to the right of the second green) was demolished.
- 1972/73 – the old building on the right of the fairway was demolished.
- 1975 – the last remaining trees of the Dalton's former orchard were removed. Approximately 12,000 trees have by now been planted by the Golf Club
- 1980 – Orange Golf Club sold portions on southern boundary for Orange High School and new residential development – leaving 57 hectares (140 acres) (current land area (2003).
- 1981 – painting and exterior maintenance of the guesthouse, gate house and front gates.
- 1982–85 – the clubhouse was refurbished, including the dining room, a new bar was installed, recarpeting the bar and the Brennan Room's dance floor, refurbishing the guesthouse including bedrooms with period furniture, new carpet and modernised facilities. The guesthouse kitchen was renovated. Five blocks of land on the property were sold to help finance improvements.

== Heritage listing ==
The property now known as Duntryleague was part of one of the first land grants in the Orange area in 1834, located adjacent to the later gazetted township of Orange and comprising a full square mile. The property was grazed for many years by various owners and tenants, but William Sampson, the first grantee who was himself an absent land owner with interests in the Mudgee area, also established his early property called Campdale on the land. The property also included other early buildings important in the history of Orange such as John Peisley's the Coach and Horses which is regarded as the first inn in the Blackman's Swamp (Orange) area.

James Dalton, the prominent Orange merchant, purchased sections of the land from 187205 to establish a substantial family estate of 311 acres that he named Duntryleague after his birthplace in Ireland. In 1876 he commissioned the design and construction of a mansion located on a prominent ridge of the property from Sydney architect Benjamin Backhouse. The house is a splendid example of mid Victorian splendour designed in the Victorian Filigree style with a richness of detail befitting the man of wealth and influence that James had become by that time. The estate included two gatehouses, an ornate entrance and gates, a stables, a dairy, 2–3 workers' cottages, a fern house, orchards, vegetable gardens for the household and extensive pastures for grazing.

James initially assisted his father in their first shop in Orange after arriving from Ireland at the age of 15. In 1853 he set up his own store at the corner of Post Office Lane which he later managed with his brother Thomas who arrived in Australia in 1858. His father went on to manage the well known Daniel O'Connell Inn in Orange. The Dalton Bros. business grew to become the largest wholesale merchanting business west of the Blue Mountains with interests throughout the Central West, eastwards to Sydney and northwards to the Queensland border at the height of their success in the late 1800s. The store building that James built in Summer Street was significantly added to over the years and was to become one of the landmark buildings in town. The Sydney side of the business was managed by Thomas who lived at Wheatleigh in North Sydney and the company was notable in the city for Dalton House in Pitt Street and the Dalton Wharf at Millers Point.

Over the years up to 1925 in Orange the family have been associated with a large number of significant homes and also owned and managed a number of extensive pastoral properties. Many of these buildings remain today as testimony to the importance of the family in the region.

The Dalton family was among New South Wales' most influential and wealthy Catholic families. The Irish-Catholic community in Orange was relatively large and particularly wealthy enough to play a dominant role in politics and the social and spiritual development of the town. The Daltons were instrumental in the financing of St. Joseph's Catholic Church in Orange and James Dalton had built Australia Hall in Lord's Place to provide the controversial venue for a group of visiting Irish Nationalists in 1883. James may also have provided funds and leadership for the Irish Nationalist Movement in NSW. Some of the Dalton children later studied in Ireland and returned to Australia to work. The Dalton family were involved in the early civic development of Orange. Some stood on local Council (James Dalton Mayor 1869, Michael Francis Dalton Councillor from 1906 for many years). In 1877 James was awarded the rare honour of being made a Papal Knight by Pope Gregory for his services to the Catholic Church and the large stained glass window in the hall of Duntryleague commemorates his investiture.

After James' death the house and grounds were retained briefly in family ownership and also used as a large convalescent hospital run by the Red Cross. The property was then purchased by the Orange Golf Club in 1935 as a home for the club, which had originally been established in Orange in 1909, but had outgrown earlier Club premises. James Dalton had in fact opened the Club in 1901.

The club has made some alterations to the house and grounds over the years but both still retain significant aspects of their history that are still able to demonstrate the original design and use of the property. The club has established itself at Duntryleague over the past 70 years as an important golf club in NSW with an setting for its courses and attracting local, state and international players and visitors.

Duntryleague property has strong historic associations with prominent merchant, pastoralist and townsman, James Dalton, and architect Benjamin Backhouse, its designer, R Scott & JJ McMurtrie, stonemasons. Duntryleague has aesthetic significance with its prominent hilltop location, extensive grounds now a golf course, fine collection of magnificent mature trees, original estate elements including an axial entry driveway with gate keeper's lodge, notable house, terraced former gardens and tennis courts.

Duntryleague contains a house of mid Victorian style, an example of Victorian Filigree style by virtue of its ornate cast-iron work to the portico and verandahs. It displays high standards of construction and high quality craftsmanship in its joinery an ironwork.

Gate Keeper's Lodge

This simple building is relieved by its decorative traceried bargeboards. It is of additional interest for its association with the wealthy and influential Dalton family, former owners of the Duntryleague property.

Estate

Duntryleague's grounds while modified into a notable golf course have considerable historic, aesthetic and social significance. They have historic associations with the Dalton family, the Orange Golf Club and a series of gardeners, golf course and landscape designers notable within NSW, including Andrew Alfred Patterson, John Irving, Richard Apperly & Ilmar Berzins. The grounds have a considerable collection of mature exotic trees. The main entrance drive off Woodward Street in particular is richly planted from the gate house up to the mansion, as is the area around the mansion, with a mixture of conifers, evergreen and deciduous trees.

Duntryleague was listed on the New South Wales State Heritage Register on 2 April 1999.

== See also ==
- List of golf courses in New South Wales
