= Dalton Bros =

Australian milling company

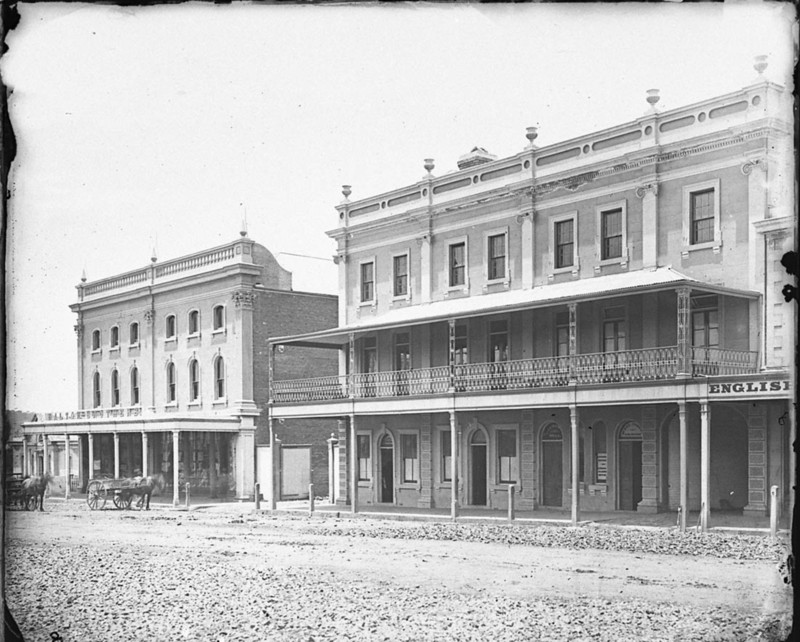
Dalton Bros Stores on Summer Street

The Dalton Bros was a company formed in the mid-1800s in Orange, New South Wales, Australia. It was formed by James Dalton and his brother, Thomas Dalton. The company flourished for many years in Orange until it became one of the largest milling companies in Australia.

The Dalton Bros company became so powerful, it had the largest pastoral holdings in Australia at the time, including places like Belowra in the 1880s, Gobala, Nevertire, in 1898 and the Lookout at Mullion. The head of Dalton Bros, James Dalton became so wealthy from the company he built some of Australia's most seen buildings in Orange such as Duntryleague, 'Kangaroobie', 'Mena', 'Killeny', 'Galbally' and 'Ammerdown' Homestead.

The Dalton Bros also had their imposing stores on Summer Street in Orange, which still dominate the streetscape today being one of the largest building fronts in the Central Business District.

Along with these holdings, Dalton Bros also had 'Dalton House' on Pitt Street in Sydney in 1878. and they owned stores in Lower Fort Street occupied a dock at Millers Point.
