= Commercial director =

Manager in an organisation

A commercial director is an executive responsible for managing the commercial department within an organization, or a specific commercial project.

== Filmmaking industry ==
In filmmaking industry, a commercial director is a film director who specializes in the creation of commercials, often for television, but sometimes also on film and of music videos (given that music videos are recognized as a form of advertising for the song featured in the video).

=== Noted commercial directors ===
Noted directors of commercials include: Ridley Scott, Adrian Lyne, Hugh Hudson, Jean-Paul Goude, Jonathan Glazer, Michel Gondry, Spike Jonze, Joe Pytka, Tarsem Singh, Dougal Wilson and Tony Kaye, Norman Hafezi, Barry Myers. Music video directors who have gone on to feature film production include Michael Mann and Julien Temple.

== See also ==
- Category:Television advertisement directors
