= Charles Myers =

Charles or Charlie Myers may refer to:

- Charles Samuel Myers (1873–1946), English physician and psychologist
- Charles G. Myers (1810–1881), American lawyer and politician
- Charles Andrew Myers (1913–2000), American labor economist
- Charles E. Myers (1925-2016), American aerospace innovator and engineer
- Charles F. Myers, author and screenwriter, also known by the pen name Henry Farrell
- Charles William Myers (1936-2018), American herpetologist
- Charlie Myers (soccer), American soccer player
- Charlie Myers (athlete) (born 1997), British pole vaulter
