= Barry Myers =

Barry Myers may refer to:

- Barry Myers (baseball) (1938/9–2017), American baseball coach
- Barry Myers (director) (1937–2016), English film director
- Barry Lee Myers, American attorney and businessman
