= Richard Myers (disambiguation) =

Richard Myers (born 1942) is the former Chairman of the Joint Chiefs of Staff (USA).

Richard Myers may also refer to:

- Richard Myers (filmmaker) (active since 1960), American experimental filmmaker
- Richard Myers (songwriter) (1901–1977), American songwriter
- Richie Myers (1930–2011), American baseball player
- Richard P. Myers (1947–2010), American politician, member of the Illinois House of Representatives
- Richard M. Myers (born 1954), American geneticist and biochemist
- Richard E. Myers (1934–2026), American politician in the state of Iowa
- Richard E. Myers II (born 1967), United States District Judge of the United States District Court for the Eastern District of North Carolina
- Rick Scott (born Richard Lynn Myers, 1952), U.S. Senator from Florida
