= Frances Myers =

Frances Myers may refer to:

- Fran Myers, American television soap opera writer and actress
- Frances Myers (artist), American printmaker

== See also ==
- Francis Myers (disambiguation)
