= Thomas Myers =

Thomas or Tom Myers may refer to:

- Thomas Myers (mathematician) (1774–1834), English mathematician and geographer
- Thomas Myers (MP) (1764–1835), English member of parliament
- Tom Myers (politician) (1872–1949), member of the British House of Commons for Spen Valley 1920–1922
- Tom Myers (sound engineer), American sound engineer
- Tom Myers (safety) (born 1950), American football safety who played for ten seasons in the National Football League for the New Orleans Saints
- Tom Myers (born 1983), a comedian
- Tom Myers (quarterback) (1943–2024), American football quarterback who played for two seasons in the National Football League for the Detroit Lions
- Tommy Myers (1901–1944), American football back
