= Henry Myers =

Henry Myers may refer to:

- Henry Myers (navy) (1827–1901), paymaster in the United States Navy and Confederate States Navy
- Henry C. Myers (Montana politician) (1836–1929), American mayor of Missoula, Montana
- Henry C. Myers (Mississippi politician) (1847–1917)
- Henry Myers (shortstop) (1858–1895), American baseball player
- Henry L. Myers (1862–1943), US Senator from Montana
- Harry C. Myers (1882–1938), American actor sometimes known as Henry Myers
- Hy Myers (1889–1965), American baseball player
- Henry Myers (footballer) (1921–1999), Australian rules footballer
- H. Clay Myers Jr. (1927–2004), American politician
