= Francis Myers =

Francis Myers may refer to:

- Francis J. Myers (1901–1956), American politician from Pennsylvania
- Francis Kerschner Myers (1874–1940), United States federal judge
- Francis Myers (fl. 1854), California pioneer and designer of the Casa Grande house in New Almaden, San Jose, California

== See also ==
- Frank Myers (disambiguation)
- Frances Myers (disambiguation)
