= Alan Myers =

Alan Myers is the name of:

- Alan Myers (drummer) (1955–2013), American drummer who played in the new wave band Devo
- Alan Myers (translator) (1933–2010), British translator, and contributing associate editor of Northern Review in Newcastle
