= Frank Myers =

Frank Myers may refer to:

- Frank Myers (politician) (1908–1975), politician in Prince Edward Island, Canada
- Frank Myers (basketball), basketball coach
- Frank Myers (American football) (born 1956), American football player, see Indianapolis Colts draft history
- Frank J. Myers (born 1957), American country music singer
- Frank Harmon Myers (c. 1899–1956), American painter

== See also ==
- Francis Myers (disambiguation)
