= Leonard Myers =

Leonard Myers may refer to:

- Leonard Myers (politician) (1827–1905), American politician
- Leonard Myers (American football) (1978–2017), American football player

== See also ==
- Leonard B. Meyer (1918–2007), American composer
- Meyers Leonard (born 1992), American basketball player
