= Thomas Myers (mathematician) =

Thomas Myers (13 February 1774 – 21 April 1834) was an English mathematician and geographer.

== Early life ==
Myers was born 13 February 1774, in Hovingham village, North Yorkshire, England.

== Career ==
In 1806, Myers was appointed professor of mathematics at the Royal Military Academy, Woolwich.

== Personal life ==
In 1807, Myers married Anna Maria, youngest daughter of John Hale. They had a son, Frederic Myers. On 21 April 1834, Myers died in his home in Blackheath, London, England.

== Works ==
Myers wrote:

- 'A Compendious System of Modern Geography, with Maps,' 1812, London, 8vo; re-edited ten years later in 2 vols. 4to.
- 'A Statistical Chart of Europe,' 1813.
- 'An Essay on Improving the Condition of the Poor, . . . with Hints on the Means of Employing those who are now Discharged from His Majesty's Service,' 1814.
- 'A Practical Treatise on finding the Latitude and Longitude at Sea, with Tables, &c., translated from the French of M. de Rossel' [1815].
- 'Remarks on a Course of Education designed to prepare the Youthful Mind for a career of Honour, Patriotism, and Philanthropy,' 1818.

In this the author, described as honorary member of the London Philosophical Society, recommends the study of mathematics, and especially of geometry, 'not only for checking the wanderings of a volatile disposition, . . . but for inspiring the mind with a love of truth.' The work was reprinted in the twelfth volume of the 'Pamphleteer.' Myers also wrote essays, chiefly on astronomical subjects, in various of the annual numbers of 'Time's Telescope' from 1811 onwards. The memoir of Captain Parry, introduced in one of these, and an 'Essay on Man' are highly praised in the 'Gentleman's Magazine,' 1823 p. 524, 1825 p. 541.

== Additional sources ==
- J. H. Lupton; Adrian Rice (2004). "Myers, Thomas (1774–1834)". Oxford Dictionary of National Biography (online ed.). Oxford University Press. doi:10.1093/ref:odnb/19689. (Subscription or UK public library membership required.)
