= Charles E. Myers =

United States Navy officer

Lieutenant Charles E. Myers Jr.
- Born: Charles E. Myers; March 21, 1925; Hampton, Virginia
- Died: May 9, 2016 (aged 91); Naples, Florida
- Burial place: Culpeper National Cemetery
- Spouse: Sallie Myers
- Military career
- Allegiance: United States of America
- Branch: United States Army Air Forces; United States Navy
- Rank: Lieutenant
- Nickname: Chuck

Charles Myers Jr. (March 21, 1925 – May 9, 2016) was an aviation pioneer and an early member of the "Fighter Mafia" inside the Pentagon. He served as the Director for Air Warfare in the Office of the Secretary of Defense between 1973–78 during which time he launched Project Harvey which later became known as the “stealth” program.
