= Maurice William Myers =

American librarian

- Born: February 18, 1821; London, England
- Died: December 8, 1899 (aged 78); Cincinnati, Ohio

Maurice William Myers (February 18, 1821 – December 8, 1899) was an American librarian.

== Biography ==
Maurice William Myers was born to a Jewish family in London in 1821. He emigrated to New York in 1833, and moved to Cincinnati in 1837. He first studied law and was admitted to the bar, but ultimately became sublibrarian of the library of the Cincinnati Law Library Association (1860), and then chief librarian (1861). The library was burned on March 29, 1884, but chiefly through Myers' efforts the building was rebuilt, and at his death it contained 30,000 volumes, almost all selected by himself.
