= Brad Myers =

Brad Myers may refer to:

- Brad Myers (American football) (born 1929), American football player
- Brad Myers (guitarist) (born 1975), jazz guitarist and producer
- Brad A. Myers, American computer scientist
- darbian, an American speedrunner
