= Harry Myers (disambiguation) =

Harry Myers may refer to:

- Harry C. Myers (1882–1938), American film actor and director
- Harry Myers (rugby) (1875–1906), English rugby player
