= Judith Myers =

Judith Myers may refer to:

- Judith H. Myers, Canadian-American ecologist
- Judith A. Myers (born 1939), American educator, secretary, and politician
- Judith Myers (Halloween), a character in the Halloween franchise
