= Ernest Myers =

Ernest Myers is the name of:

- Ernest Myers (author) (1844–1921), English poet, classicist and author
- Ernest Myers (footballer), English footballer
