= Paul Myers =

Paul Myers is the name of:

- PZ Myers (born 1957), American biologist
- Paul Myers (musician) (born 1960), Canadian rock musician, journalist
- Paul Myers (record producer) (born 1967), English record producer
- Paul Myers, founding host of Christian radio program The Haven of Rest from 1934 to 1971
- Paul Walter Myers (1932–2015), English record producer and writer
