= Frederic Myers =

Revd Frederic Myers (20 September 1811, Blackheath, London – 20 July 1851, Clifton, Cumberland) was a Church of England clergyman and author.

He was the son of Thomas Myers (1774–1834), mathematician and geographer, and his wife, Anna Maria, née Hale. Myers was educated at Clare College, Cambridge from 1829 to 1833 where he won the Hulsean prize and was elected a Fellow. In 1835 he became curate of Ancaster, Lincolnshire and in 1838 perpetual curate and first incumbent of the newly built St John's, Keswick, Cumbria. He founded St. John's school in 1840 and in 1849 Keswick's first public library with the proceeds of a legacy from his mother-in-law, Mrs. John Marshall. The school served for a Sunday School as well as an infant school during the week.

He married Fanny Lucas in 1839 and after her death in 1840 he married Susan Harriet Marshall (1811–1896), daughter of the wealthy industrialist John Marshall (1765–1845). The couple's children included poet, classicist, philologist, and psychic researcher Frederic W. H. Myers (1843–1901), poet Ernest Myers (1844–1921) and Dr Arthur Thomas Myers (1851–1894).

== Works ==
- Six lectures on great men, delivered at the monthly parochial meetings in S. John's School Room Keswick 1842 - 1848. 1848
- Catholic thoughts on the Bible and theology. 1848
- Catholic thoughts on the Church of Christ and the Church of England. 1874
