= Elizabeth Myers (disambiguation) =

Elizabeth Myers may refer to:

- Elizabeth Myers (1912–1947), British novelist
- Liz Myers, American musician, composer, pianist and singer
