= Richard M. Myers =

American geneticist and biochemist (born 1954)

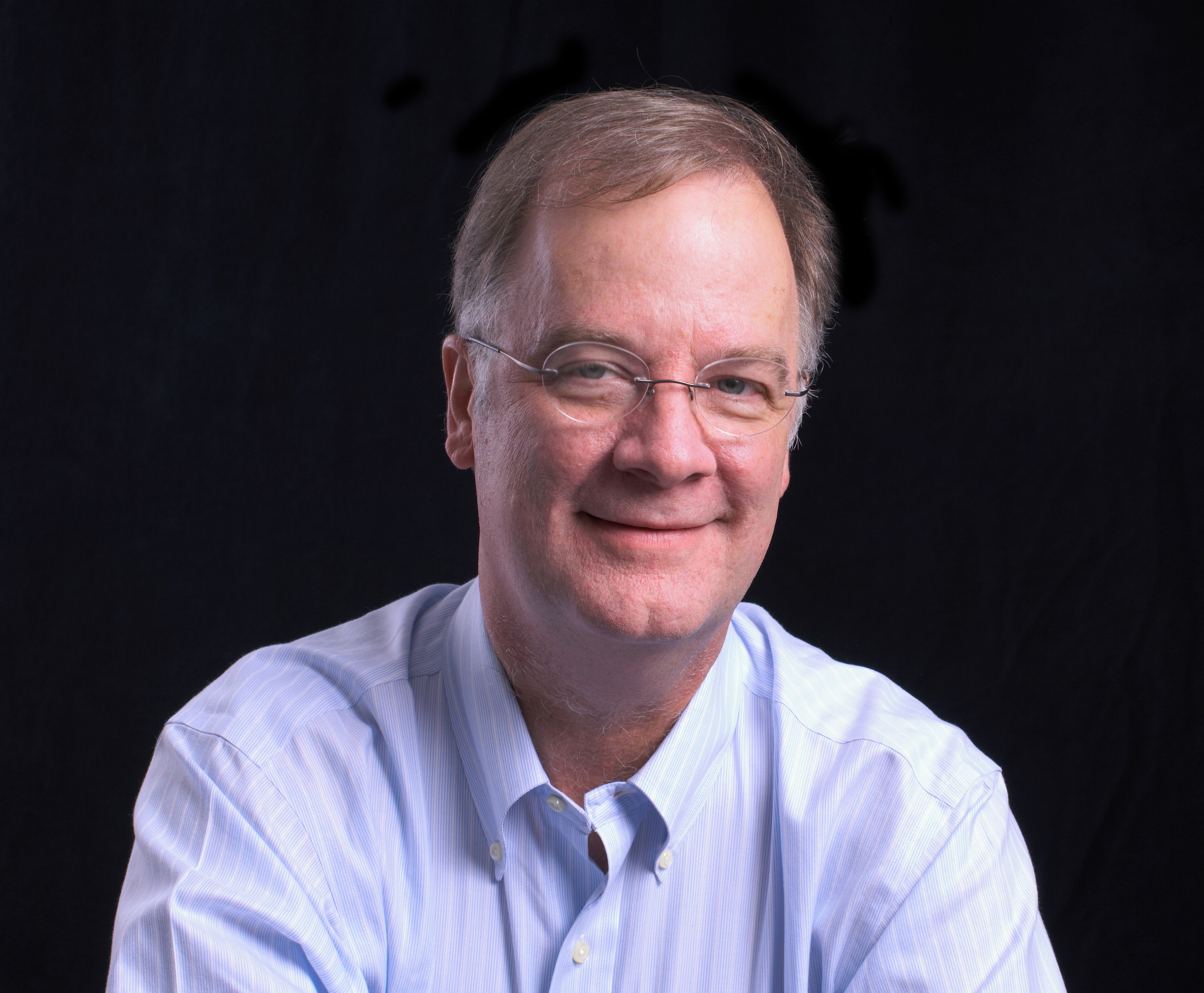
- Born: March 24, 1954 (age 72); Selma, Alabama, United States
- Education: University of Alabama (BS in Biochemistry); University of California at Berkeley (PhD in biochemistry)
- Scientific career
- Fields: Genetics
- Workplaces: HudsonAlpha Institute for Biotechnology

Richard M. Myers (born March 24, 1954) is an American geneticist and biochemist known for his work on the Human Genome Project (HGP). The National Human Genome Research Institute says the HGP “[gave] the world a resource of detailed information about the structure, organization and function of the complete set of human genes.” Myers' genome center, in collaboration with the Joint Genome Institute, contributed more than 10 percent of the data in the project.

As of July 1, 2022, Myers is Chief Scientific Officer and President Emeritus of the HudsonAlpha Institute for Biotechnology, a non-profit research institute. Before that, Myers was President and Science Director of the Institute. He was previously the chair of the department of genetics at Stanford University and director of the Stanford Human Genome Center.

His research focuses on the human genome with the goal of understanding how allelic variation and gene expression changes contribute to human traits, including diseases, behaviors and other phenotypes.

== Early life and education ==
Myers was born in Selma, Alabama in 1954 and moved to Tuscaloosa, Alabama at age 10. He attended college at the University of Alabama where he earned his bachelor's degree in biochemistry. He then went to graduate school at the University of California at Berkeley, earning his Ph.D. in 1982 in the laboratory of Robert Tjian. After that, Myers spent almost four years as a postdoctoral fellow in the lab of Tom Maniatis at Harvard University, where he studied human gene regulation. Some new technologies he developed in Maniatis's lab exposed him to the field of human genetics, and much of his work since then has involved developing and using genomics and genetic tools to understand basic human biology and disease.

== Origins of the Human Genome Project ==
On behalf of Maniatis, Myers attended a conference sponsored by the U.S. Department of Energy and the International Commission for Protection Against Environmental Mutagens and Carcinogens. 19 researchers, including Myers, met at an Alta, Utah ski resort In December 1984 with a challenge in mind. The group explored how scientists might determine whether the atomic bombs dropped on Hiroshima and Nagasaki during World War II increased the rate of mutations in the sperm or eggs of survivors. Scientists believed the high doses of radiation could have increased the germline mutation rate, but they would need methods to measure mutations in the children of survivors. Those methods would allow them to compare the number of mutations in offspring compared to exposed survivors of the bomb blasts.

Myers recalls a conference attendee saying, “The rate is so low that we would have to sequence the entire human genome to know the answer.” Not long after, the Department of Energy proposed the basis for the Human Genome Project, which began in earnest in 1990.

== Early Genetic Research ==
In 1985, Myers set up a lab at the University of California in San Francisco. His team sought to understand globin gene expression, studying both cis- and trans-acting components that regulate transcription of the gene. His team also worked on finding the mutated gene present in people with Huntington disease. Myers teamed up with David Cox, a medical geneticist with a Ph.D. in yeast and human genetics. Their laboratories worked together for 15 years, on multiple technologies for gene hunting, including radiation hybrid mapping, a method that uses high-energy x-rays to fragment human chromosomes that were recovered in somatic cell hybrids and then used to determine the locations of DNA markers in the human genome. In 1990 they established a human genome center, which they moved to Stanford University in early 1993. The pair continued working on inherited human diseases. They found the genes for an inherited form of childhood progressive epilepsy (EPM1), a gene important for a key step in development of the cerebellum (the “weaver” gene), and others. Over the course of those years, the Myers lab created and worked with mouse models for Huntington disease and EPM1.

== Human Genome Project Contributions ==
Cox and Myers in their work at the Stanford Human Genome Center collaborated with the Joint Genome Institute (JGI) in Walnut Creek to sequence the first human genome. That collaboration led to maps of the entire genome, which played a key role in piecing the entire sequence together for the Human Genome Project (HGP). The Stanford group generated genome-wide maps as well as finishing of sequences of three human chromosomes, and their collaboration with JGI contributed 11% of the finished human genome.

== The HudsonAlpha Institute for Biotechnology ==
Biotech visionaries Jim Hudson and Lonnie McMillian founded the HudsonAlpha Institute for Biotechnology in 2008, recruiting Myers to lead the Institute as president and science director.

The Myers Lab at HudsonAlpha studies the human genome, with a focus on allelic variation and how gene expression changes contribute to human traits, including disease. His group utilizes a number of high-throughput genomic methods, including DNA sequencing, genotyping, chromatin immunoprecipitation, mRNA expression profiling, transcriptional promoter and DNA methylation measurements. The lab also uses computational and statistical tools for identifying, characterizing and understanding how functional elements of the genome work together at the molecular level. Researchers in the Myers Lab use these and other state-of-the-art methods to explore how genomes are involved in brain disorders, ALS, cancer, children born with developmental disorders, autoimmune diseases and other traits.

== Honors and awards ==
- 1975: Phi Beta Kappa, University of Alabama
- 1977-1978: Abraham Rosenberg and Kaiser Fellowships, UC Berkeley
- 1979-1980: Regents Fellowship, UC Berkeley
- 1980-1981: Honors Students’ Society, UC Berkeley
- 1982-1984: Damon Runyon-Walter Winchell Cancer Fund Fellowship, UC Berkeley
- 1984-1985: Leukemia Society of America Senior Postdoctoral Fellowship, Harvard
- 1988: Basil O’Connor Starter Scholar Research Award, UCSF
- 1987-1990: Searle Scholar, UCSF
- 1986-2003: Wills Foundation Award, UCSF/Stanford
- 2002: Darden Lecture Award, University of Alabama
- 2002: Pritzker Foundation Award, University of Washington
- 2003: Blount Initiative Award, University of Alabama
- 2005: Honorary Doctorate in Humane Letters, University of Alabama
- 2009: Leadership Alabama Induee, Class 20
- 2011: AAAS Fellow, American Association for the Advancement of Science
- 2020: Wright A. Gardner Award, Alabama Academy of Science
