= Henry Myers (footballer) =

Australian rules footballer

Personal information
- Full name: Henry George Gordon Myers
- Born: 16 November 1921; West Melbourne, Victoria
- Died: 9 July 1999 (aged 77)
- Original team: Sandringham
- Height: 180 cm (5 ft 11 in)
- Weight: 89 kg (196 lb)

Playing career^{1}
Years	Club	Games (Goals)
1948	St Kilda	2 (0)
- ^{1} Playing statistics correct to the end of 1948.

Henry George Gordon Myers (16 November 1921 – 9 July 1999) was an Australian rules footballer who played with St Kilda in the Victorian Football League (VFL).

Myers served in the Royal Australian Navy during World War II.
