= Bruce Myers =

Bruce Myers may refer to:

- Bruce Myers (actor) (1942–2020), British actor, comedian and director
- Bruce Myers (bishop) (born 1972), Canadian bishop

== See also ==
- Bruce Meyers (1926–2021), American designer of the Meyers Manx dune buggy
- G. Bruce Meyers (born 1948), American politician in the Montana House of Representatives
- Bruce Meyer (born 1957), Canadian poet and educator
