= Matthew Myers =

Matthew or Matt Myers may refer to:

- Matthew Myers (cricketer) (1847–1919), English cricketer
- Matthew Myers (judge) (born 1970), Australian judge and professor
- Matthew Myers (ice hockey) (born 1984), retired Welsh ice hockey player
- Matt Myers (baseball) (born 1974), American baseball coach and former pitcher
- Matt Myers (wrestler) (born 1991), British professional wrestler
- Matt Myers (American football) (born 1986), American football coach

== See also ==
- MD Myers (born 2001), Matthew Dylan Myers, American soccer player
