= Samuel Myers =

Samuel Myers may refer to:

- Samuel L. Myers Sr. (1919–2021), American economist, administrator, and civil rights advocate
- Samuel Myers Jr. (born 1949), American economist
- Sam Myers (1936–2006), American blues musician and songwriter
- Sam Myers (rugby union) (born 1990)
