= James Myers =

James Myers may refer to:

- James E. Myers (1919–2001), American songwriter, co-credited writer (as Jimmy DeKnight) of "Rock Around the Clock"
- James Myers (politician) (1795–1864), American politician, lieutenant governor of Ohio, 1854–1856
- Jim Myers (1921–2014), American football coach
- Jimmy Myers (baseball) (born 1969), former Major League Baseball pitcher
- James J. Myers (1842–1915), politician in Massachusetts

== See also ==
- James Myer (born 1951), American documentary and educational filmmaker
