= Amy Myers (artist) =

American artist

- Born: 1965 (age 60–61); Austin, Texas
- Education: BFA, Kansas City Art Institute; MFA School of the Art Institute of Chicago
- Known for: abstraction
- Website: amymyersdrawings.com

Amy Myers (born 1965 in Austin, Texas) is an American artist whose strong forms, compositions and geometric symmetry situates her practice in a lineage with the work of Lee Boutecou, Hilma af Klint, Georgia O'Keeffe, and Roberto Matta.

== Early life ==
Born in Austin, Texas, Myers grew up around scientists. She recalls, "As a very young child, I was involved in discussions concerning theoretical physics and contemporary cosmology. Because of these discussions I grew up with a lot of questions about how the universe works, and why things function as they do. I was surrounded by images of molecules, and I think my subject matter stems from a dialogue that I had with my family about such images. As a result, I'm interested in the internal logic of things and the unpredictable nature of the universe." Myers spent a portion of her childhood living in Adana, Turkey where she traveled extensively throughout the Middle East and Europe.

== Education ==
Myers received a Bachelors of Fine Arts from the Kansas City Art Institute in 1995, and a Masters of Fine Arts from the School of the Art Institute of Chicago in 1999.

== Early career ==
Myers began to focus more heavily on drawing when she was pursuing her undergraduate degree at art school. In that environment, painting was more valued and viewed as an artist's primary focus while drawing was just supposed to be a means to an end. This led her to determine at a certain point that she needed to separate from the entire dialogue of painting in order to work privately without interruption. Within this solitude, Myers was able to connect her fascination with physics and the natural world directly and immediately through drawing. This prompted her to begin to work exclusively on paper. She began collecting a large trove of objects (insects, plants, etc.) that she put under her microscope and cataloged through observational sketches. She drew from this catalog for years until that knowledge became embedded in her mind as natural architecture. From these investigative drawings she began articulating a lexicon of symbols and signs which accumulated, forming systems that ultimately became the visual language that she employs in all of her works. This core language of symbols allows her to expand and build upon their complexity and interactions intuitively. She describes the drawings as ultimately "creating themselves". Myers is noted as once remarking about her work that, "There is a great deal of discipline here. Every mark on a drawing is related to something else. It's all a system. It's not haphazard, there are no whimsical marks and it's not like design. There is a reason behind every mark. It must function as an integrated whole."

== Signature style ==
Between 2001 and 2019, Myers was predominantly known for her large scale graphite and gouache drawings on paper. In 2019 she expanded her medium to include oil on canvas. For Myers, oil paint provides a different speed to work in and a greater possibility for expanding spatial dimensions in her work. Specifically, she is able to in her words, "superimpose distinct fields of action" which allows her to play with concepts of simultaneity and indeterminacy through the paintings. Additionally, Myers finds that the scientific properties of oil paint match her conceptual interests intrinsically due to how light passes through the medium. She notes, "When light hits the surface of the painting, the photons actually bounce back-and-forth in that very very minuscule layer of paint, creating a luminosity that drawing cannot achieve". Myers returns to two distinct palettes when she paints each piece. One is a natural palette consisting of ochres, ombres and siennas and the second is a more modern palette that dips into acidic colors like cobalts, naphthols and metallics. She finds that through the use of these two seemingly opposite color palettes she is able to paint the nuance of the in-between, the entangled and what lies within the gap.

== Methodology ==
When working on paper, Myers uses multiple sheets of Rives BFK. This creates an "inherent grid" underneath the drawing which can operate as a "longitude and latitude" for the complex lattice systems she builds on top of them. Myers’ approach to drawing involves adding paper as her work reaches the edge and requires more room for an adequate "resolution". This can lead to her drawings being made up of 2, 6 or even 12 separate sheets of paper that merge to make one whole composition. For Myers, the scale of her work is significant. She creates on a scale larger than a human body, which she sees as giving the viewer an experience they can physically step into. For Myers, the scale is a pathway that encourages the viewer to suspend time and let go into the possibilities of the work.

Symmetry is an essential component of Myers's compositions. She references "All particles in the universe are spinning, creating an inherent visual symmetry. My compositions are slightly off center, creating a dynamic spatial relationship between the artwork and the viewer, which in turn allows the composition to maintain its inherent spinning motion." Myers references William Blake’s famous "The Tyger" and DH LAwrence’s "The Third Thing" as important pieces of literature that have informed her practice. Blake's and Lawrence's poems weave words that allow for the meaning of their work to be indeterminate; an openness that Myers insists on in her own work as well.

Myers uses architect's tools like large compasses, French curves and metal rulers to create a foundational blueprint or diagram that is "readable" while maintaining her visual symbols which are more mysterious and unknowable. The juxtaposition of these two legibilities is the gap between worlds that exists in theoretical physics and that her work points to visually. These compositions are not pre-planned or sketched out before Myers takes pencil to paper or paint to canvas, instead the work occurs like an event as she continues to ask theoretical questions across the surface.

When describing her work, Myers sometimes refers to symbols in the work with terms that sound like they could have been pulled from the latest article of Popular Science, like "quantametronics". These terms help her make sense of the complex system interactions she is posing in each drawing. Many drawings contain over 30 different systems overlapping, weaving and obscuring one another. Elaborating further Myers explains, "These quantametronics all have very specific functions. They always exist outside of the central core of the image. They are on the margins because their function is to gather information and inform."

== Scientific Research ==
Before Myers attended art school at Kansas City Art Institute, she took a theoretical physics class at the University of Texas with the distinguished Nobel Laureate in Physics for Black Hole Theory, Dr. John Wheeler. Throughout the course of the semester, Dr. Wheeler's focus was on the human imagination. According to Myers, "Wheeler wanted our most outlandish inventive improbable narratives on the origin of our universe. Creativity and imagination was not secondary. Imagination drove the inquiry. This had a profound effect on my thinking and ultimately encouraged me to pursue art."

When speaking about how her approach to creating mirrors the scientific method Myers’ states, "What I share with scientific inquiry is the goal of finding the beauty of an integrated equation. In a way, scientists are driven by the search for that elegance. When an equation works, there is a certain rhythm that completely relates to art. Imagine a scientist at work on an equation filling notebooks for days and days. At one point it would break, and answers would flow out. After that, a weight would be lifted. I imagine it would be similar to the sense of completion I feel when I resolve a drawing."

== Titles ==
The depth of Myers’ curiosity can be found in her methodology for titling the work. Her titles always come from a place of invention, because, "the work comes from that place. The work demands its own kind of language. I can't apply my knowledge to it or speak about it in my terms, so I give it its own set of words." She describes the process of constructing the title HYPOND LATTICE/GROUND STATE in the following manner, "My titles are indicators or proposals for the work. They are not truths. It's fairly arbitrary, like an astronomer naming a star, or planet, or some other previously uncharted body. Take HYPOND LATTICE/ GROUND STATE for example, "hy" refers to hydrogen, which is the simplest known element containing only two components---a proton and an electron. "Pond" refers to a self-sustained, complete aquatic environment. "Lattice" is a type of diagram mathematicians use to show the ordering of events or elements. "Ground state" is the home state, or the state of an element's lowest energy."

In another example, Myers’ describes the titling process as follows, "In CUMULAPNEUMA (THE THIRD THING), "cumula" is a type of cloud formation and "pneuma" refers to breath. "The Third Thing" is a reference to a poem of the same title by D. H. Lawrence. The poem is about a molecule of water-two parts hydrogen and one part oxygen, plus a third element present that completes the molecule but remains unknown and somewhat mysterious. So the titles are descriptive, and they also have function. They function synergistically with the work by adding another layer of meaning. They are usually added at the very end."

== Collections ==
Myers' work is in the permanent museum collections of The Solomon R. Guggenheim Museum (NY, NY), Perez Art Museum (Miami, FL), Museum of Fine Arts in Houston (Houston, TX), Fort Wayne Museum of Art (Fort Wayne, IN), Greenville County Museum of Art (Greenville, SC), Laguna Art Museum (Laguna Beach, CA), The Kleefeld Museum of Contemporary Art (Los Angeles, CA), Nora Eccoles Harrison Museum of Art (Logan, UT), Hudson Valley Museum of Contemporary Art (Peekskill, NY), Nerman Museum of Contemporary Art (Kansas City, MO) and many others.

== Exhibitions ==
Myers has had exhibitions at Rhona Hoffman Gallery (Chicago, IL), Mary Boone Gallery (NY, NY), Suzanne Vielmetter Projects (LA, CA), Talley Dunn Gallery (Dallas, TX), The Sweeney Art Museum (Riverside, CA), The Kleefeld Museum of Contemporary Art (LA, CA), Atlanta Contemporary Arts Center (Atlanta, GA), Danese Gallery (NY, NY), Valerie McKenzie Fine Art (NY, NY), The Benton Museum (Pomona, CA), Santa Barbara Contemporary Arts Forum (Santa Barbara, CA), Wayne State University Art Museum (Detroit, MI), Museum of Fine Arts (Houston, TX), Telfair Museums (Savannah, GA), Weatherspoon Museum (Greensboro, NC), Hudson Valley Museum of Contemporary Art (Peekskill, NY), Nerman Museum (Overland Park, KS), San Jose Museum of Art (San Jose, CA), H&R Block ARTSPACE (Kansas City, MO), Sun Valley Center for the Arts (Ketchum, ID), Auckland Art Museum (Chapel Hill, NC), Greenville County Museum of Art (Greenville, SC), Tweed Museum of Art (Duluth, MN), Knoxville Museum of Art (Knoxville, TN), Morris Museum (Morristown, NJ), Gallery MOMO Ryogoku (Tokyo, Japan), and The Berkshire Museum (Pittsfiend, MA) amongst others.

== Awards ==
Myers has received awards from The Adolph and Esther Gottlieb Foundation Award, The Pollock-Krasner Foundation, The American Academy in Rome, The American Academy of Arts and Letters, The Marie Walsh Sharpe Foundation, Yaddo Artist Residency, The Dora Maar House Artist Residency, The Creativity Conference in Sea Island, GA and is a current Studio Member Artist at The Elizabeth Foundation for the Arts in New York.

== Publications ==
Myers' work has been discussed in numerous publications including ARTFORUM, Hyperallergic, The New York Times, The Los Angeles Times, Artnet, The Dallas Morning News, Glasstire, The Kansas City Star, The Brooklyn Rail, BOMB Magazine, Art in America, ArtCritical, Artnews, Art and Auction and Art on Paper to name a few.
