= Barry Myers (director) =

- Born: Barry Myers; 1 June 1937; London, England
- Died: 17 August 2016 (aged 79)
- Occupations: film director screenwriter
- Years active: 19??–

Barry Myers (1 June 1937 – 17 August 2016) was an English advertising filmmaker.

== Early life ==
He was born in Hampstead. He attended King's College School in Wimbledon, then studied French and German at Brasenose College, Oxford.

== Career ==
After working in agencies as copywriter on commercial scripts, Barry moved on to directing his own scripts. He then started his own company, Spots. During the following years of its existence, Spots grew to be one of the world's top production companies, with offices in London, Los Angeles, New York and Paris, winning Gold in every major festival around the world.

He produced the Cadbury Finger of Fudge advert for Cadbury Fudge, with music from The Lincolnshire Poacher written by Mike d'Abo, and the Cadbury Flake advert with a young female in a field.

He directed the first of the Malcolm commercials for Vicks Sinex "Student" with Barbara New and Nigel Plaskitt.

== Personal life ==
He died on 17 August 2016.

== Filmography ==
Noteworthy commercials

- 1978 : Olympus (Snapshot)
- 1978 : Tefal (Tefal Superfryers - Gas Masks)
- 1979 : Lustucru (L'oeuf fêlé 2)
- 1984 : Barclays (Mr Grey)
- 1984 : Radio Rentals (Love Scene)
- 1985 : Public Information Film (Smoker of the Future)
- 1985 : Hovis (Watermill)
- 1988 : British Airways
- 1989 : Volkswagen Golf (Le père et l'enfant)
- 1990 : Barilla (Le Museé et Sauces Toscanes)
- 1990 : Citroën ('Spike')
- 1993 : Renault Clio ("Le Paradis communiste" et "L'Héritier")
- 1995 : Smirnoff ("People's Army")
- 1996 : Axe ("Jalousie")
- 1997 : Mars ("Cyber")
- 1998 : Schweppes ("Fièvre de la jungle")
- 1999 : Mars ("L'indien")
- 2000 : McDonald's ("Traffic Jam")
- 2004 : William Lawson's ("Sharon Stone")
