= James Dalton (pastoralist) =

Australian businessman (1861–1947)

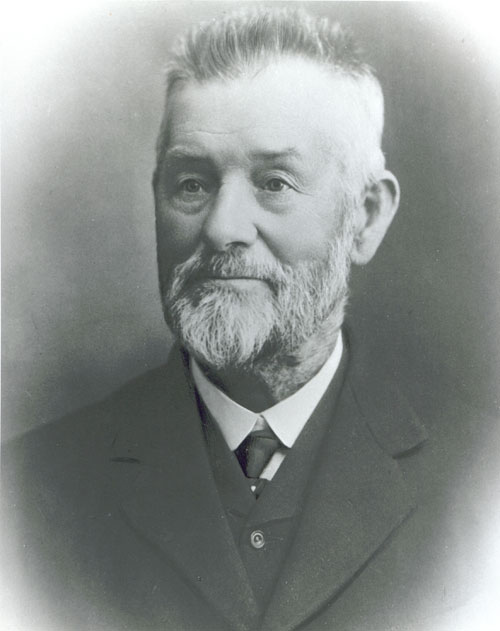

Personal details
- Born: 1834 Duntryleague, Limerick, Ireland
- Died: 17 March 1919 (aged 84–85) Duntryleague House, Orange, New South Wales
- Spouse: Margaret Mary Collins
- Relations: Thomas Dalton (brother), Margaret Dalton (sister)
- Children: 12 Children (listed below)
- Occupation: Catholic Lay Leader, Flour Miller, General Merchant, Grazier, Shop Keeper

James Dalton (1834 in County Limerick, Ireland – 17 March 1919 in Duntryleague, Orange, New South Wales) was a wealthy Australian merchant and pastoralist who promoted Roman Catholicism and the development of food distribution throughout the Colony of New South Wales. He was the patriarch of the wealthy Irish Australian Dalton family.

== Life ==
=== Ireland ===
James Dalton was born in 1834 in Duntryleague, County Limerick, Ireland as the second son of James Dalton and his first wife Eleanor Dalton (née Ryan); he had an elder brother, Thomas, and an elder sister, Margaret. He lived in Duntryleague for the first 13 years of his life. His father was shipped to the Colony of New South Wales for aiding and assisting in kidnapping a widow, Catherine Sheehan, in November 1833 and imprisoning her for a week in the north of Ireland with several other men, one being his brother-in-law, Daniel Ryan. James Dalton senior was tried on 14 March 1835, and was at first sentenced to death on 8 April; the sentence was shortly afterward commuted to transportation. He was transported to New South Wales in 1835 on the convict ship the Hive, on its second voyage to Australia, when James Dalton junior was less than a year old. When James senior reached Australia, the Hive was wrecked near Jervis Bay with one fatality whilst it sailed along the coast. He arrived in Sydney on Christmas Eve 1835 after the New South Wales Government sent a ship to help salvage the prisoners, soldiers and money the ship was carrying.

James's mother died at some point when his father was in New South Wales, and he was left alone whilst Thomas and Margaret Dalton were in North America. In 1842–43, his father had been released from Bathurst Jail in New South Wales with a ticket of freedom to do as he pleased, including to move back to Ireland, but he chose to stay in Australia and moved to Fredericks Valley, a small mining settlement near Lucknow. In 1847 James' father petitioned for his family to be shipped to New South Wales; James, being the only one in Ireland, was shipped aboard the Panama, accompanied by no-one, to the Colony.

Both Thomas and Margaret Dalton eventually moved to Australia.

=== Australia ===
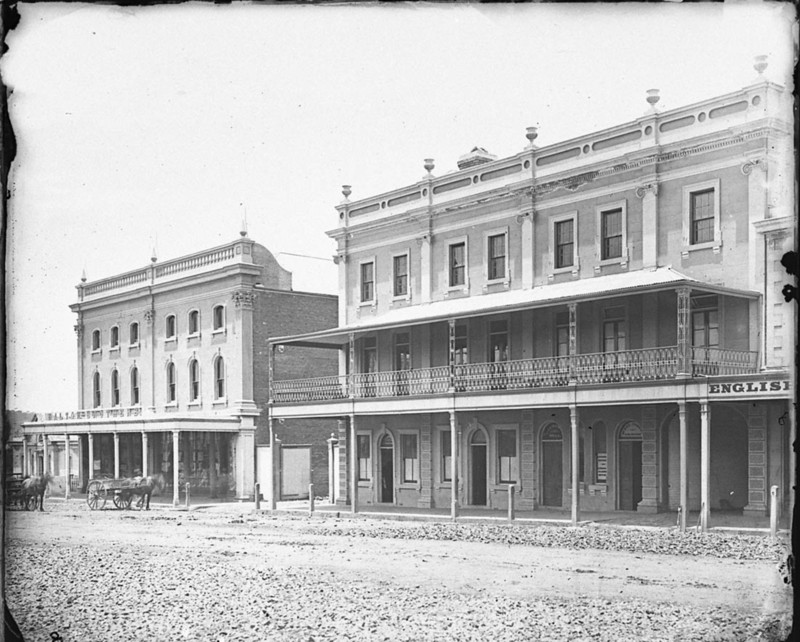
The Dalton Bros Stores on Summer Street, Orange, built in the 1870s, which were built on the site of the original store built in the 1860s

When James arrived in Australia in 1847, his father was in a small mining settlement known as Fredericks Valley just out of the settlement of Orange (then known as Blackmans Swamp) near Lucknow, between Blackmans Swamp and Bathurst running a small shop for the miners. Together, James senior and James junior, ran a small wood and bark clad shop in Fredericks Valley. In 1851, James senior remarried Joanna Hogan in St Mary's Cathedral, Sydney, and together they have another three children. After he remarried, James senior moved to Orange (Blackmans Swamp Creek) and opened another store with his new wife and James junior. James senior became a publican at the Daniel O'Connell Inn. In 1858, Thomas Dalton, James junior's older brother, returned from Canada and arrived in Orange, via Sydney. Thomas and James ran the store in Orange which was now known as the Dalton Bros store. In the same year, James junior married Margaret Mary Collins, the eldest child of John, who was the proprietor of the Springside Inn, and Jane Collins. The Collins' had moved to New South Wales in 1841 as bounty immigrants. James and Margaret had 12 children.

In 1860, Margaret Dalton, James and Thomas's sister, married an Irishman in the United States, Michael Casey. A year later, Thomas Dalton married Elizabeth Fahy and together they had seven children. In 1865 Margaret (James and Thomas's sister) and Michael moved to Australia. James senior died on 1 January 1860, prior to the arrival of Margaret and Michael Collins. James Dalton senior's widow remarried.

In 1869, James became the Mayor of Orange and an active member of the community. He was also the first captain of the Orange Volunteer Fire Brigade in 1870 and an officer of Orange District Hospital in 1866. In that year his brother Thomas joined him and the firm became known as Dalton Bros. James helped displaced miners and in 1857 promised to build a mill if they grew wheat; his flour-mill was built in 1861, which later became one of the largest and most expensive in the colony. The firm's business expanded until it became the largest wholesale distributor west of the Blue Mountains. They had great success producing roasted and ground coffee and wheat on a large scale. The Dalton Bros Flour Mill also shipped flour to Britain and was very expensive and highly regarded in prestigious shows in England.

Thomas left Orange and moved to Sydney and opened the import and export division of Dalton Bros. He built Dalton House in 1878 on Pitt Street and built stores in Lower Fort Street. Dalton Bros became such a large and influential company, they occupied a dock at Millers Point, Barangaroo. After his first wife died in 1877 at the age of 24 years, Thomas remarried to Mary-Anne Ahern. Thomas received papal knighthood, became mayor of Orange in 1877, represented Orange in the NSW Legislative Assembly between 1882 and 1891 and was a member of the NSW Legislative Council between 1892 and 1901. He died in Sydney on 26 June 1901. His daughter Blanche married Sir Mark Sheldon.

In about 1880, with James running the bulk of the Dalton Bros company, it was worth approximately £125,000, (estimated in 2010, with inflation, GDP, and currency changes, to be worth £9,700,000 or A$14.27 million). Despite exceptional enterprise and business ability James was kindly, unassuming and ever ready to help an Irishman in distress. He was a friend of Cardinal Patrick Moran and Bishop John Dunne and a benefactor of St Mary's Cathedral. James, was appointed a papal knight in 1877 and died, aged 85, on 17 March 1919 at Duntryleague, Orange. He is buried in the Dalton Crypt at the Orange Cemetery. He was predeceased by his wife, he was survived by six sons and six daughters.

== Children ==
James and Margaret Dalton had 12 children, 6 boys and 6 girls:

Order	Name	Years (if known)	Biographical notes
1	Thomas Garret Dalton	1859 – 1911	Known as Gatty, he was first educated at Mr Flannagan's School Orange afterwards going to St Stanislaus College (Bathurst). He graduated from The University of Sydney with a Master of Arts (with honours) and although he studied law, he joined Dalton Bros and became Managing Director. He married May Condon in 1886 and together they had six children. May died in 1895. He then married Mary Butler and they had a further two children. In 1875 James Dalton Jnr built Killarney in Kite Street for Gatty and his family (now known as Mena). He was Mayor of Orange between 1903 and 1905. He was also involved with the hospital, town band and rugby union football.
2	J. J. Dalton	6 February 1861 –	Studied law and was an Irish nationalist Member of Parliament (MP) for West Donegal from 1890 to 1892. He was the first Australian born member of the British Parliament.
3	Elanor Redmond Dalton	– 31 January 1947	Married Willie Redmond on 24 February 1886 and they had one son who died in 1891, aged five.
4	John Jack Dalton		Was married and worked at Dalton Bros and died age 35 from a short illness
5	Jane "Jenny" Dalton		Died in France
6	Michael "MF" Dalton		Worked in rural areas until later running "Gobabla" and "Kangaroobie" and also the Dalton Bros Company
7	Winifred Dalton		Sacred Heart nun
8	Elizabeth Dalton		Sacred Heart nun
9	Edward "EB Dick" Dalton		Involved in Dalton Bros
10	Rosie Mckillop		Married William Mckillop MP, moved to Ireland, but later moved back to Orange after William died
11	Patrick Dalton		Became a Jesuit priest and professed in Ireland, but later moved back to Australia
12			

Out of the eight of the twelve children of James Dalton that gave offspring, 23 were born.

== Influence in Orange and New South Wales ==
James Dalton was a major influence on the running of Orange and the surrounding areas. James Dalton was the mayor of Orange in 1869, he was a major influence on the train line going through to Orange, he built outstanding homes throughout the Orange area with commanding views over the whole region. James was also a key person in the construction of the famous Cook Park in Central Orange taking up an entire city block. He was also one of the major firms and families to fund the building of the band stand and the James Dalton Fountain Since he was Irish Catholic and very wealthy he was one of the most powerful Catholic men in the colony, he funded the construction of Orange's St Joseph's Catholic Church.

=== Buildings constructed and owned by James Dalton in Orange ===
He also built many of Oranges famous buildings such as:

- Duntryleague Mansion, Woodward Street (1876) When it was built it was one of the colony's grandest homes. It was built for approximately 50,000 pounds (today it would be equal to 3,522,000 Australian dollars (approx) or 2,285,000 British pounds) It is now one of Australia's most prestigious golf courses. When James became a papal knight, he was given a stunning stained glass window by the Vatican for his services to the church which is on display in Duntryleague's grand staircase. It is on the National Heritage List.
- Kangaroobie Homestead (1881)
- Galbally Byng Street - It is on the State Heritage List
- Mena, Kite Street (1875). James built it for his sons but was later turned into a maternity hospital in the 1930s. It was then turned into a block of flats but has since been renovated and converted to its former glory. - It is on the National Heritage List.
- The Dalton Bros Shop buildings, Summer Street (1865)
- Ammerdown Homestead - It is on the National Heritage List.
- Adare
- Look Out
- Australia Hall (Australia Cinema)
- Dalton Wool Stores
- Dalton Bros first flour Mill - North East Corner of Summer and Sale Streets ("The formal opening of Messrs. Dalton Bros. new flour mill took place to-day, and was celebrated with a banquet, at which over 300 persons sat down. Mr. James Dalton occupied the chair, and there were present Messer's. Torps, M.L A., J. T, Lane, P. M.., the Mayors of Orange and East Orange, and most of the leading citizens. The mill was started by the Misses Jane and Winifred Dalton, daughters of the proprietors. The erection of the mill was started 12-month ago, the building being from plans by Messer's. A. D. Nelson and Co., Sydney, who contracted for the erection of all the machinery. The machinery was made by Messer's Hind and Lund, of Preston, Lancashire, England. In the meantime while, the construction of the mill was going on the ironwork was being constructed by Messer's A. D. Nelson in Sydney. The machinery is considerably heavier than that in any other mill in New South Wales There are five brake roller mills 40in. Long and 10in. in diameter. The reduction plant contains nine sets of rollers, each 25in. long and 10in. in diameter, and each of the mills has four rollers. There are 17 acts of elevators. On the second floor is the Atlas purifiers, so constructed as to dispense with storeroom and dust collectors. On the third floor are the centrifugals and scalpers. On the floor are more centrifugals and brake reels. In the basement the shafting for driving the reduction and brake rolls extends the full length of the building. One feature of the machinery is that the motive power is in every case direct from the engine to each line of shafting. The new building contains 300,000 bricks, and 12,000 yards of earth were excavated for the foundations. The plant is said to be the largest and most expensive in the colony" - from The Sydney Morning Herald - Tuesday 19 April 1892). The mill ceased production in 1908 when the Dalton Bros new mill was opened (below).
- Dalton Bros second flour Mill - Peisley Street, across from Wade Park Oval opened in 1908 to replace the earlier mill (above). The Mill ceased Production in 1956 and most of it was torn down in 1965, however a section still remains.

=== Pastoral holdings across New South Wales ===
By the time of James' death in 1919, the family's Orange district landholdings encompassed more than 30,000 ha extending from the town boundary to Mullion Creek, 20 km to the north. In addition, the Dalton's owned the 11,000 ha "Gobabla" at Nevertire and "Belowra" (20,000 ha) near Nymagee, as well as interests in several stations around Condobolin. The Orange properties alone ran 40,000 sheep, which were shorn – along with sheep from other surrounding properties– at a 32-stand wool shed near the Mullion Creek railway siding. The properties were run as an integrated unit as Dalton Estates, with weaners (Romney/Merino cross) sent from "Kangaroobie" to "Gobabla" to grow out, the wether portion then transferred as wool cutters to "Belowra" and the ewes back to "Kangaroobie". Shorthorn cattle were also run on "Kangaroobie" and other Dalton properties, and bullocks were sent to the western stations for finishing in good seasons.

=== Sydney holdings ===
James Dalton was very influential throughout the colony and owned land and buildings across New South Wales. When James and his brother became partners, they built stores in lower Fort Street and had one of the largest owned wharfs and bond and free warehouses at Millers Point on Port Jackson. They also built Dalton House at 115 Pitt Street (which is no longer standing) to manage the company east of the Blue Mountains and to manage the importing/exporting branch of Dalton Bros.

== John and William Redmond ==
James Dalton provided funds and leadership for the Irish nationalist movement in New South Wales. In 1882 his presiding over an Irish Land League meeting was questioned in the Legislative Assembly. He was closely associated with the visit of the Irish nationalists, John and William Redmond, to the colony in 1883. As president of the local branch of the Irish National League, Dalton with two other magistrates signed an address of welcome to Redmond, which praised their 'resolute resistance to the oppressive proceedings of a foreign senate.

James had a lot to do John and William Redmond, and while the Redmonds were in Orange, they wanted to lecture in some of the halls in the district, but the council denied them access and they didn't want to lecture in James's Shop. On this note, James built the Redmonds their own hall the lecture in, it is now known as the Australian Cinema in Lords Place which was a premier cinema in Orange until late 2010, it is now in line to be converted into an evangelical church until the church raises funds to build a new facility.

On 4 September 1884 John Redmond married Dalton's half-sister Johanna, and then James's eldest daughter, Elanor, On 24 February 1886 in London, married Willie Redmond, which cemented the families bonds and they became renowned partners. Willie Redmond was Promoted to major in World War I, he was killed in action on 7 June 1917 on Wytschaete Ridge, Belgium, and was buried in the garden of the hospice at Locre. Elanor returned to Orange and died in Sydney on 31 January 1947, predeceased by their only son.

== See also ==
- Orange
- John Redmond
- J. J. Dalton
