= Mayer (name) =

Mayer is a common German surname and less frequent as a given name. Notable people with the name include:

== Surname ==
=== Mayer ===
- Adolf Mayer (1843–1942), German-Dutch virologist
- Albrecht Mayer (born 1965), German classical oboist
- Alfred Mayer (disambiguation)
- Andreas Mayer (disambiguation)
- Arno J. Mayer (1926–2023), Luxembourgish historian
- Arthur Mayer (1886–1981), American film producer and distributor who worked with Joseph Burstyn
- Auguste Étienne François Mayer (1805–1890), French naval painter
- Ben Mayer (1925–2000), amateur astronomer
- Bernadette Mayer (1945–2022), American poet and author
- Bianca Mayer (born 1979), German musician and singer
- Brantz Mayer (1809–1879), American writer
- Carl Mayer (1894–1944), Austrian-German screenwriter
- Charles Mayer (disambiguation)
- Christa Mayer, German mezzo-soprano
- Christa C. Mayer Thurman (born 1934), German-born American curator, art historian
- Christian Mayer (disambiguation)
- Christopher Mayer (disambiguation)
- Constant Mayer (1829–1911), French-born American painter
- Daisy von Scherler Mayer (born 1965), American film director
- Daniel Mayer (1909–1996), French politician
- Daniel Mayer (impresario) (1856–1928), German-born English agent and mayor
- David Mayer (disambiguation)
- Delia Mayer (born 1967), Swiss actress and singer
- Eckehard Mayer (born 1946), German classical composer and author
- Edelmiro Mayer (1834–1897), Argentine soldier and statesman
- Edwin Justus Mayer (1896–1960), American screenwriter
- Elizabeth Mayer (1884–1970), German-American translator and writer
- Else Mayer (1891–1962), German nun and women's liberation activist
- Emilie Mayer (1812–1883) German composer of Romantic music
- Erskine Mayer (1887–1957), American major league baseball player
- Florian Mayer (born 1983), German tennis player
- Francis Blackwell Mayer (1827–1899), United States painter
- Frank Mayer (1902–1960), American football player
- Fred Mayer (disambiguation)
- Gene Mayer (born 1956), American former tennis player
- Gerhard Mayer (born 1980), Austrian discus thrower
- Gustav Mayer (1871–1948), German journalist and historian
- Hans Mayer (disambiguation)
- Helen Mayer (1932–2008), Australian politician
- Helene Mayer (1910–53), German and American Olympic champion foil fencer
- Henry Mayer (disambiguation)
- Hugo Mayer (politician, born 1899) (1899–1968), German politician
- Irene Mayer Selznick (1907–1990), American theatrical producer, daughter of Louis B. Mayer
- Jacob Mayer, American rabbi
- Jacob Erskine Mayer (1889–1957), American baseball player
- Jacquelyn Mayer (born 1942), American beauty contest winner and motivational speaker
- James Mayer (disambiguation)
- Jane Mayer (born 1955), American investigative journalist
- Jaromír Mayer, Czech singer Jaromír Mayer
- Jean Mayer (disambiguation)
- Joanna Isabel Mayer (1904–1991), American mathematician and educator
- Johann Mayer (disambiguation)
- John Mayer (disambiguation)
- Jojo Mayer (born 1963), Swiss drummer
- Jorge Mayer (1915–2010), Argentine priest, Archbishop of Bahía Blanca
- José Mayer, Brazilian actor
- Joseph Mayer (disambiguation)
- Karl Mayer (disambiguation)
- Karla Mayer (born 1918, disappeared 1944), guard at three Nazi death camps
- Karoly Mayer (1908–2000), Hungarian footballer
- Klaus Mayer (1923–2022), German Roman-catholic priest and author
- Lauren Etame Mayer (born 1977), Cameroonian footballer
- Leonardo Mayer (born 1987), Argentine tennis player
- Leopold Mayer (died 1914), German swimmer
- Levy Mayer (1858–1922), American lawyer
- Lippman Mayer (1841–1904), German-American rabbi
- Louis Mayer (disambiguation)
- Lucas Mayer (disambiguation), several people
- Marcel Mayer, French sculptor, painter and engraver
- Maria Goeppert Mayer, née Göppert (1906–1972), German-American physicist
- Marissa Mayer (born 1975), American CEO of Yahoo!
- Martin Mayer (1928–2019), American nonfiction author
- Matías Mayer (born 1996), Argentine footballer
- Matthias Mayer (born 1990), Austrian retired alpine skier
- Mercer Mayer (born 1943), American children's book author and illustrator
- Michael Mayer (disambiguation), multiple people
- Mónica Mayer (born 1954), Mexican artist, activist and art critic
- Nathaniel Mayer (1944–2008), American rhythm-and-blues singer
- Norman Mayer (1916–1982), American anti-nuclear activist
- Oscar F. Mayer (1859–1955), founder of the Oscar Mayer Company
- Paul Mayer (disambiguation)
- Peter Mayer (1936–2018), American publisher
- Philip Mayer (disambiguation)
- René Mayer (1895–1972), French politician
- Richard Mayer (disambiguation)
- Robert Mayer (disambiguation), several people
- Rupert Mayer (1876–1945), Jesuit priest and Nazi resistance figure
- Roland Mayer (classicist) (born 1947), Classical scholar
- Sandy Mayer (born 1952), American tennis player
- Sarah Mayer (1896–1957), British judoka
- Scott Mayer (disambiguation)
- Selma Mayer (1884–1984), "Schwester Selma", German-Jewish nurse
- Sergio Mayer (born 1966), Mexican actor and singer
- Sheldon Mayer (1917–1991), American cartoonist and editor
- Siegmund Mayer (1842–1910), German physiologist
- Sina Mayer (born 1995), German sprinter
- Stefan Mayer (1895–1981), Polish intelligence officer
- Stepanka Mayer (born 1949), Czech and German chess player
- Stephan Mayer (born 1973), German politician
- Stephen F. Mayer (1854–1935), American politician
- Teddy Mayer (1935–2009), American racecar driver and brother of Timmy
- Theresa Mayer, American nanotechnologist and academic administrator
- Thomas Mayer (disambiguation)
- Tim Mayer (born 1966), son of Teddy and racecar executive
- Timmy Mayer (1938–1964), American racecar driver
- Tobias Mayer (1723–1762), German astronomer
- Victor Mayer (1857–1946), German jeweler
- Victoria Mayer (born 2001), Argentine volleyball player
- Walther Mayer (1887–1948), Austrian mathematician
- Wilhelm Mayer (disambiguation)
- William Mayer (disambiguation)
- Youngmi Mayer, American comedian

=== Modified surname ===
de Mayer

- Nicholas De Mayer (c. 1631–1695), ninth mayor of New York City

von Mayer

- Julius Robert von Mayer (1814–1878), German physician and physicist who made significant contributions to early thermodynamics

== Variation on surname ==
- Mike-Mayer (surname)
- Maria Goeppert-Mayer (1906–1972), German-American physicist, married to Joseph Edward Mayer
- Heidrun Mohr-Mayer (1941–2014), German jeweler
- Herbert Mohr-Mayer (born 1933), German jeweler

== Given or middle name ==
A first or second Hebrew name, an alternative spelling of Meir:

- Hermann Mayer Salomon Goldschmidt
- Mayer Lambert (1863–1930), French orientalist
- Mayer Messing (1843–1930), German-American rabbi
- Mayer Amschel Rothschild family
  - Baron Mayer Amschel de Rothschild
  - Carl Mayer von Rothschild, founder of the Rothschild banking family of Naples
  - David Mayer de Rothschild
  - James Mayer Rothschild, founder of the Rothschild banking family of France
  - Mayer Alphonse James Rothschild
  - Mayer Amschel Rothschild
  - Nathan Mayer Rothschild, founder of the Rothschild banking family of England
  - Nathan Mayer Rothschild, 1st Baron Rothschild
  - Salomon Mayer von Rothschild, founder of the Rothschild banking family of Austria
- Isaac Mayer Wise
- Mayer Hawthorne (born 1979), stage name of American rap singer

== See also ==
- Maier
- Mair (disambiguation)
- Mayr
- Meier (disambiguation)
- Meir (disambiguation)
- Meyer (disambiguation)
- Meyers
- Meyr (disambiguation)
- Myer (disambiguation)
- Myers
- Von Meyer
- Majer
