= C. Mayer =

C. Mayer may refer to:

- C. Mayer (crater), a lunar crater named after the astronomer Christian Mayer (1719–1783)
- people named Christian Mayer
- people named Christopher Mayer
- people named Carl Mayer
- people named Charles Mayer
- Christa Mayer - German mezzo-soprano
- Constant Mayer - French painter
