= Mike Meyers =

Mike Meyers is the name of:

- Mike Meyers (pitcher) (born 1977), former professional baseball pitcher
- Mike Meyers (outfielder) (born 1993), minor league baseball outfielder

== See also ==
- Michael Meyer (disambiguation)
- Michael Mayer (disambiguation)
- Michael Myers (disambiguation)
- Mike Mayers (born 1991), American Major League Baseball pitcher
