= Oscar Browning =

British educationalist and historian

Oscar Browning OBE
- Oscar Browning, as caricatured in Vanity Fair (1888)
- Born: 17 January 1837; London, England
- Died: 6 October 1923 (aged 86); Rome, Italy
- Occupations: Teacher; historian
- Years active: 1860–1923
- Known for: Pioneer of professional training for teachers

Oscar Browning OBE (17 January 1837 – 6 October 1923) was a British educationalist, historian and bon vivant, a well-known Cambridge personality during the late Victorian and Edwardian eras. An innovator in the early development of professional training for teachers, he served as principal of the Cambridge University Day Training College (CUDTC) from 1891 to 1909. He was also a prolific author of popular histories and other books.

The son of a prosperous distiller, Browning was educated at Eton, and then King's College, Cambridge. On graduating in 1860 he returned to Eton as an assistant master. A vociferous and active opponent of the school's traditional curriculum and teaching methods, he introduced novel and progressive techniques to the classroom, to the general approval of his pupils but to the dismay of the Eton authorities. He was controversially dismissed from his post in 1875, ostensibly because of repeated disregard for school rules, but an underlying issue was disquiet arising from his lifestyle, particularly his close and affectionate relationships with boys under his care.

Browning returned to King's, where he continued his individualistic approach to teaching, and rapidly established himself as a leading Cambridge personality. Again, his methods were far more popular with his students than with his colleagues. An avid social climber and self-promotionist, he cultivated a range of acquaintances in the social and political worlds – he stood unsuccessfully three times for Parliament – and published a number of books on English, European and world history. He also wrote on educational theory and produced a well-regarded biography of the writer George Eliot. Despite this output, he failed to gain scholastic recognition and was repeatedly overlooked for higher college posts and academic honours. However, his pioneering work in teacher education, particularly through his leadership of the CUDTC, was later recognised as a formative factor in the development of the university's present-day Department of Education.

After his retirement in 1909 Browning moved to Rome and remained active as a writer until his death in 1923. Among his late works were two volumes of autobiography and further historical works, including a history of Italy. At the end of his life, having earlier been denied a knighthood, he was appointed an Officer of the Order of the British Empire (OBE) in the 1923 Birthday Honours for his services to education.

== Life ==
=== Childhood ===
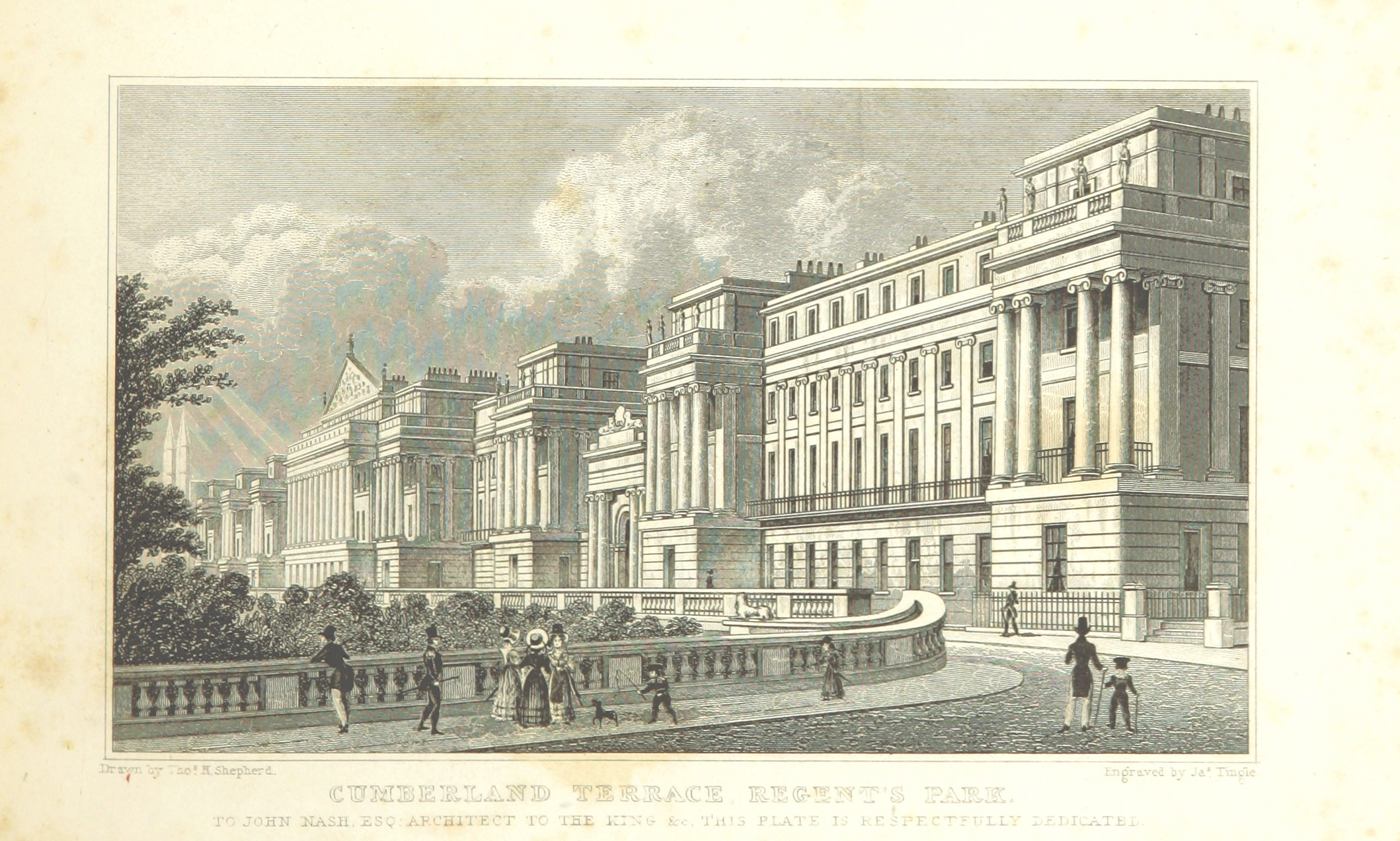
Cumberland terrace as it appeared at the time of Browning's birth in 1837

Oscar Browning was born on 17 January 1837, at No. 8 Cumberland Terrace, Regent's Park, London. His parents were William Shipton Browning, a prosperous distiller, and Mariana Margaret, née Bridge, the daughter of a sea captain. He was the fourth child, and two more daughters followed. Oscar was born prematurely, the survivor of twins the elder of who died stillborn; Oscar escaped the same fate only through the diligence and determination of a nurse.

While Oscar was still in his infancy the family moved to Windsor in Berkshire, where according to his own account Browning grew up in a succession of houses. One of these was close to the Long Walk, where "Queen [Victoria] passed our windows in her almost daily ride". Browning's early education was conducted in various schools and by tutors. Having failed to gain entrance to Eton College as a "lower boy" – on several occasions according to his own account – Browning was sent in 1848 to live with his elder brother William, by then curate of St Mary's Church, Everdon, near Daventry, to prepare for the entrance examinations that would admit him to Eton as a Scholar. He passed in the summer of 1850, and took up his place the following January as a "Colleger", (Note: The term "Colleger" refers to the small number (70) of Eton boys who by virtue of their scholarships were boarded free within the college buildings, as distinct from the much larger number, known as "Oppidans", who paid for their board in Houses run by housemasters. In Browning's day, Collegers were often regarded as socially inferior.) just before his fourteenth birthday.

=== Eton and Cambridge ===
Browning was initially shocked by life at Eton, which his biographer Ian Anstruther describes at that time as "a rough world of its own in which the weaker boys were helpless, and where the delights and depravities of vice were imposed on the youngest without restraint". In 1853 Browning began a journal, in which his descriptions of daily life suggest, say Pam Hirst and Mark McBeth in their account of Browning's life, that Eton, "[r]ather than a royally-endowed school [was] more like a Dickensian orphanage". Although his first Eton years were unhappy, his work pleased his tutor, William Johnson, who wrote of him: "Oscar reads like a student of literature ... at last I have found a genuine student combining taste with knowledge, aesthetics with grammar, sociability with thoughtfulness". Johnson's approach to education and teaching influenced Browning for the rest of his life. (Note: Johnson remained at Eton until 1872, when he was dismissed after an intimate letter to a boy was discovered. He then took the surname Cory. A respected poet, he wrote the words to the Eton Boating Song.)

Although not generally popular, Browning secured election to the exclusive Eton Society, known as "Pop". He also won a contest to write and deliver a suitable oration when Albert, the Prince Consort, visited Eton on Founder's Day in 1854. As Browning matured and his interests widened, his formal schoolwork suffered, to Johnson's distress, but the scope and extent of his reading is evidenced by a list of his books, included in his journal in November 1854: Byron and Edward Gibbon are accompanied by works from Addison, Sydney Smith, Thomas Arnold, and many more writers, classic and contemporary. Summers were often spent in Brussels, where his mother and younger sisters had moved following his father's death in 1853. On one occasion Browning contrived to be included in the royal party when the King of the Belgians visited the Emperor Napoleon III in Calais.

"He [Browning] clearly recognised how the scholarly cultures of Eton and King's transformed his education life in both harmful and beneficial ways, and throughout his teaching career strove to create an educational ambience in which he felt that students would be inspired and, as a consequence, succeed".

— Hirsch and McBeth

Browning left Eton in 1856, having gained entry to King's College, Cambridge, where he began in October. Students at King's, the sister-foundation to Eton, were all Etonians, and Browning, who found their continuing association stifling, generally preferred the company of men from other colleges, especially Trinity, where he found kindred spirits who shared his growing radical approach to education. Unlike his Eton years, Browning's time at Cambridge passed serenely.

He was invited to join the intellectual group known as the Apostles, was President of the Cambridge Union in 1859, and that same year was elected a fellow of King's – a lifetime appointment which would provide a fallback should his career in other fields falter. In a wider sphere he discovered his political identity as a Radical Liberal, a disciple of John Stuart Mill. Among the more significant friendships initiated at Cambridge was that with Henry Sidgwick from Trinity College, later a leading educational reformer, of whom Browning would write: "I consulted him on every important matter, and never failed to follow his counsel".

Browning graduated in 1860, taking fourth position in the Classical Tripos. His immediate future was undecided; perhaps travel, the English Bar, or an academic post at Cambridge. Instead, he accepted an invitation to return to Eton as an assistant master. Apart from the financial and domestic security this would bring, he saw it as an opportunity to put some of his more enlightened educational ideas into practice. He would later say that his objective as a schoolmaster was "that every pupil of mine should have an experience as different as possible from what my own had been."

=== Eton schoolmaster ===
==== Young reformer ====
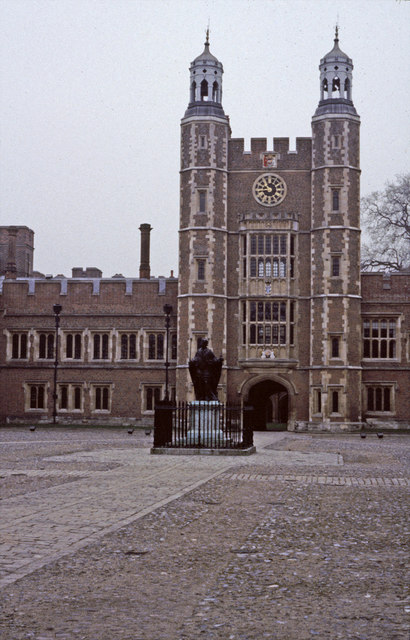
Eton College

When Browning began teaching at Eton he found the college's governance was largely unchanged from its foundation in the 15th century, and its general curriculum barely reformed from those days: classical Latin and Greek texts learned through repetition, a little mathematics, and all other subjects taught as optional extras. However, change was in the air; in 1861 the government set up the Clarendon Commission to enquire into the conditions of Britain's nine leading public schools.

When the commission investigated Eton, the newly appointed headmaster, Edward Balston, presented a cautious traditionalist view of the curriculum and governance, and saw no need for significant changes. The 25-year-old Browning, giving evidence on 2 July 1862, gave a rather more radical viewpoint. He thought that too little recognition was given to scholarly prowess as against athletic achievement, and that the formal curriculum should be overhauled to include the teaching of French and history. His wider-ranging criticisms included the nature and standard of chapel services, and the over-tolerance of the boys' beer-drinking habits.

This reforming zeal was not shared by Browning's more traditionally-minded colleagues, who included his exact contemporary Edmond Warre, a vociferous opponent of reform who in due course became Eton's headmaster and later, provost. (Note: The Provost of Eton College, a Crown appointment, is the head of the college's governing body which consists of himself and the Fellows of the college. In Browning's day, the provost had a power of veto over all decisions affecting the institution.) Nevertheless, the Clarendon Commission's report, issued in 1864, was critical of the school and largely endorsed the views of Browning and the reformers. By this time Browning had become a housemaster, which provided him with scope to put his personal educational ethos into practice. His house, under the domestic supervision of his mother, was initially the smallest in the college, with just nine boarders. As the house grew, it became known for numerous characteristic features; Richard Davenport-Hines, in a biographical sketch, summarises the general ambience thus:

"His house had a controversially Pre-Raphaelite tone; the food was nourishing and plentiful, the curtains were by William Morris ... There was much jolliness and ragging led by the man–boy at the centre, but the bronzes and marbles in his corridors discouraged rough-housing ... OB passionately desired to reform Eton so that it could educate an effective governing class for a democratic age; these new rulers, in his ideal, would rest their power on the Platonic virtues of wisdom and goodness as well as hereditary privilege."

Although not opposed to healthy physical activity – he was a keen climber and member of the Alpine Club, and promoted sports and games among the junior boys – Browning disavowed the cult of athleticism. As an alternative to "Pop", which he thought had become infested with athletics-worship, he began a Literary Society, to which distinguished visiting speakers were invited. He instituted regular poetry and play readings, and encouraged the appreciation of music with performances by local musicians of works by emergent modern composers such as Brahms. Many wealthy and influential parents sought places for their sons in Browning's house. As a result, his income rose spectacularly, from the assistant master's stipend of £42 per annum plus fees from tutoring, to something between £2,500 and £3,000 as a result of his profits from boarding fees. (Note: An income of £2,500 a year in 1865 had the purchasing power of just under £220,000 in 2017.) "I am so prosperous", he wrote in 1866, "as almost to be astonished myself".

In 1868 Browning published his first full-length work, a school textbook in the form of a new edition of the writings of the Roman historian Cornelius Nepos. He was a regular contributor of articles and reviews to some of the leading contemporary journals. He extended his educational work beyond the boundaries of the school, becoming secretary of the Windsor and Eton Association for the Education of Women.

==== Hornby and controversy ====
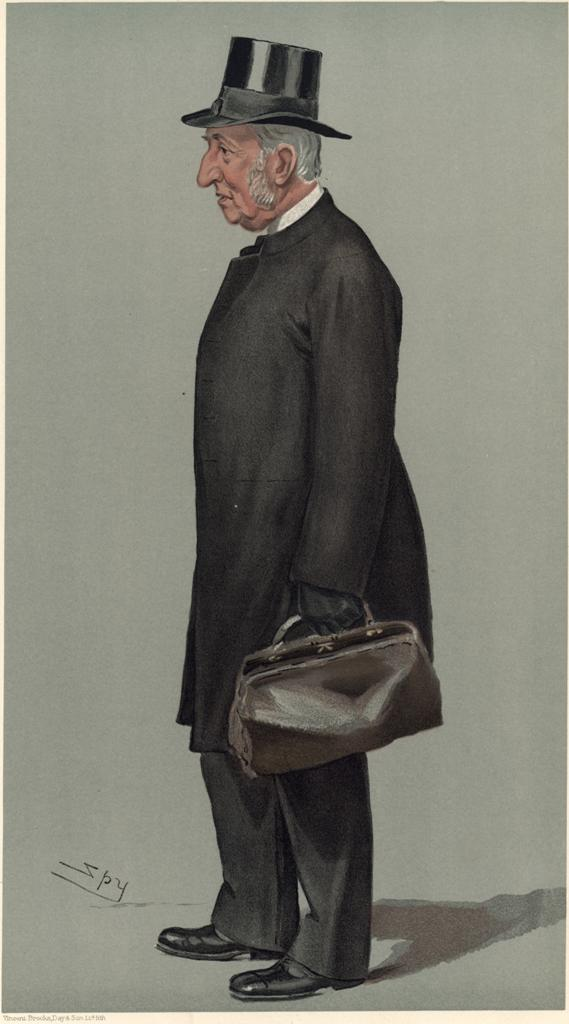
James John Hornby as depicted by Vanity Fair

In 1868 Balston resigned, and was succeeded as headmaster by James John Hornby. This appointment broke with the tradition that Eton headmasters always came from King's College, Cambridge (Hornby was an Oxford man). The change was welcomed by Browning: "We shall now be governed on the principles that universally obtain in human society". Hornby introduced modest curriculum and timetable changes which incorporated history, science, modern languages and other subjects into the main curriculum. However, the anti-reform instincts at Eton remained strong, and Hornby soon identified with the more traditionalist factions led by Warre.

He was irritated by Browning's independent outlook and objected to his teaching of "modern" history such as the French Revolution. Hornby thought that Browning neglected his real work, the teaching of classics, in favour of his experimental pedagogical methods and outside activities such as "lecturing to ladies", and was critical of a supposed lack of discipline in his classes. Contrary to Hornby's view, Browning, despite his unorthodox approach, attached great importance to the teaching of classics, and would later cite the classical education given at Eton as the chief reason for the pre-eminence of Etonians in public life.

Browning's personal relationships with boys were a further matter of concern to Hornby. Although Browning took a firm personal line against homosexuality, masturbation and any other sexual practices, he maintained a series of romantic friendships with boys. He had favourites, who were often replaced with a brutal suddenness when they lost their appeal. Sometimes, one of these would accompany him on his regular European trips during the summer holidays, as did Gerald Balfour, the future prime minister's brother, in 1869. (Note: Balfour remained a favourite throughout his time at Eton – "the most remarkable boy that I have ever met" according to Browning, who was devastated when Balfour left in 1871.) Although this type of close, even affectionate master-boy relationship was considered generally acceptable in Victorian public school life, Browning's flamboyance and mannerisms were contrary to Hornby's vision for the school; Anstruther writes: "The mere sight of Oscar Browning with his pale face and effeminate manner was enough in itself to make Hornby suspicious". Furthermore, Browning's friendship with the artist Simeon Solomon was widely known. Solomon, like Browning, was an advocate of "Greek love", a concept derived from Plato's Dialogues which held that the highest form of love was that of men for each other, exclusive of physical expression.

The two holidayed together, and Solomon was a frequent visitor to Eton – he exchanged with Browning a series of intimate letters in which they mutually extolled the beauties of various boys. In February 1873 Solomon was convicted of an act of gross indecency in a London public lavatory – a consensual act of sodomy with a mature working-class male was far from the ideals of Greek love, and Browning ended the relationship with Solomon immediately.

==== Dismissal ====
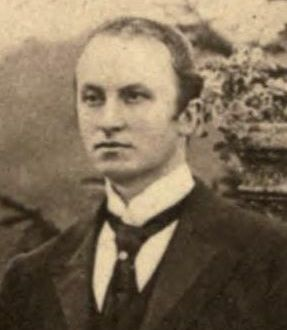
George Curzon as a young man

Hornby's patience with Browning's conduct was tested further in 1874, when Browning began a friendship with a boy from another house – acting with the full approval of the boy's father. The boy was George Curzon, the future Conservative statesman and Viceroy of India. The nature of this association became the occasion for gossip amongst the staff; Curzon's housemaster, Charles Wolley-Dod, complained to Hornby, who after some equivocation ordered Browning to end all contact with the boy during term-time.

Browning was outraged by what he took as a slur on his morals, and a heated correspondence with Hornby ensued. Since he had the support of Curzon's father, Lord Scarsdale, Browning challenged the headmaster's injunction and appealed to the provost, who upheld Hornby. Under threat of dismissal unless he submitted, Browning did so reluctantly, while continuing to meet Curzon during the holidays.

According to Browning's biographer Ian Anstruther, Browning seriously contemplated resignation in the summer of 1874, but was persuaded otherwise by his friend, the novelist George Eliot. (Note: Browning had first met George Eliot in 1867, when he invited her and her partner George Lewes to Eton.) He returned to Eton that autumn, but made little effort to lie low or adhere to regulations which he was accustomed to ignoring if inconvenient. One of these related to the maximum number of pupils for whom any master could act as tutor, that number being forty; Browning had forty-three. Although given a temporary dispensation from this rule by the provost, this expired in the summer of 1875. Browning did not seek a renewal of permission but continued to tutor his excess pupils. This act of insubordination, the latest in a long line of infringements and subversion of regulations, alongside the suspicions arising from the Curzon relationship, proved to be the last straw for Hornby. On 16 September 1875, after a series of tense meetings, he wrote a formal letter to Browning dismissing him from his post.

This sudden action stunned Browning and all of Eton. Most of the assistant masters, and many of the parents of the boys in his house, petitioned Hornby and the Governing Body to retract the dismissal. (Note: One of Browning's colleagues, A. C. Ainger, who wrote to Hornby asking for reconsideration, received a reply from Hornby indicating that there were concealed factors behind the dismissal: "Public opinion is clearly dead against him already. What would it be if the whole truth were known?") On 9 November 1875, when the governing body met to consider the matter, they ratified Hornby's decision. An appeal by Browning to public opinion led to a spate of supportive letters and editorials in the leading newspapers but to no avail. At the end of 1875, Browning closed his house and left Eton, his final request for a measure of financial compensation being rejected.

Browning spent the first months of 1876 with his family, and that summer travelled with them to Leipzig, taking along four of his former Eton pupils. He found time in August to visit Bayreuth, where he attended the first full performance of Wagner's Ring Cycle. Meanwhile, a petition against the rights of public school masters to dismiss their staff at will was presented to the House of Commons by Edward Knatchbull-Hugessen, but the House upheld such rights. A writer in The Saturday Review ridiculed the presumption of assistant masters in seeking to challenge the powers of headmasters, and stressed the dangers to schoolboys of such an example of insubordination. As to Browning, according to this anonymous correspondent, "Mr Browning has peculiar ideas as to the proper method of educating boys at a public school" – ideas inimical to Eton's traditions of "manliness and common sense".

=== Fellow of King's ===
==== Reforming don ====
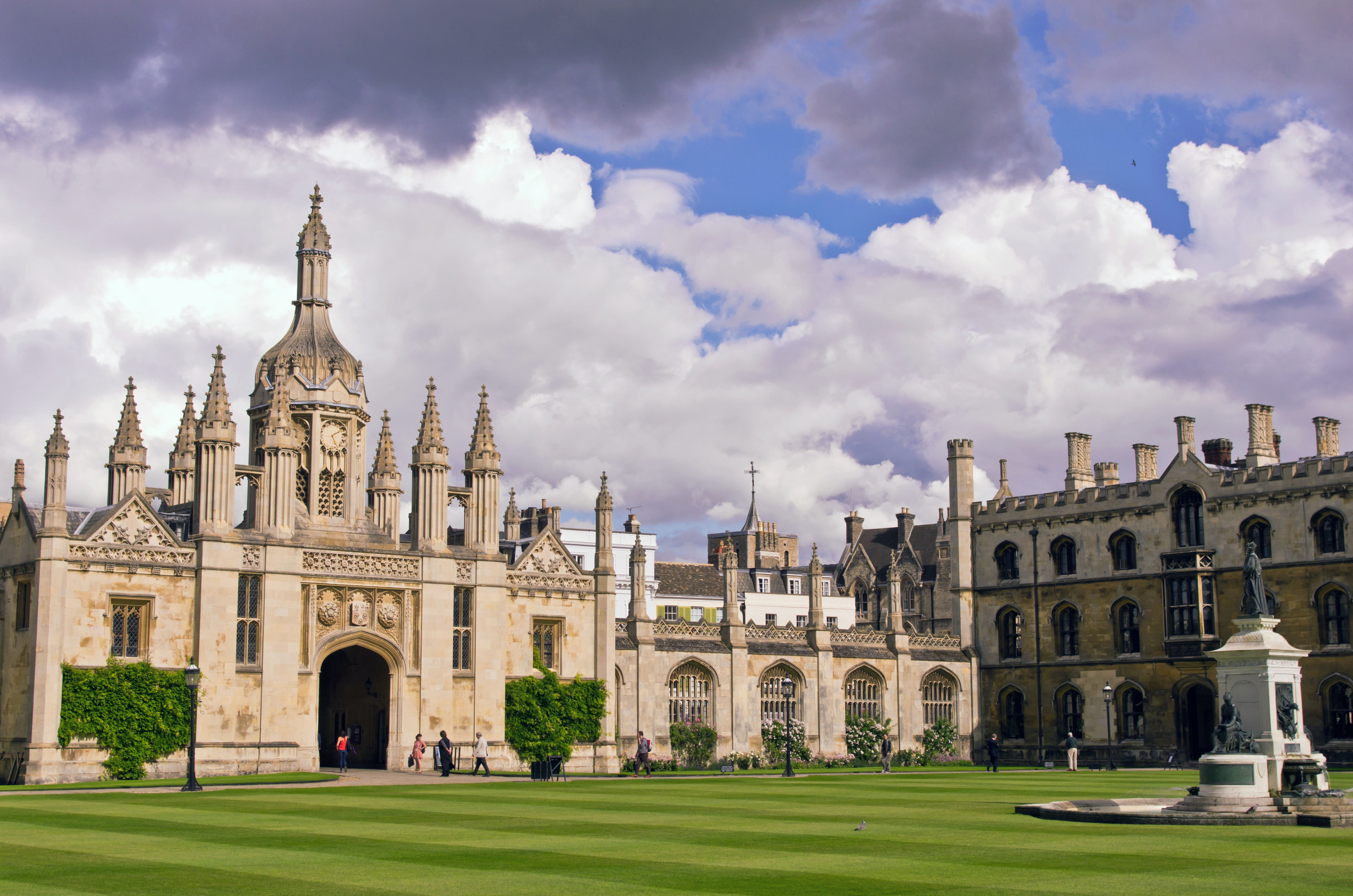
King's College, Cambridge

In September 1876, Browning returned to Cambridge and his King's College Fellowship where, despite an outwardly cordial reception, he faced some animosity. Many of his King's colleagues, all Etonians, were unimpressed by the circumstances of his departure from the school, and his reputation as a radical reformer gave further grounds for concern. This old guard obstructed his appointment to a college lectureship, which would have increased his income beyond the basic Fellow's stipend of £300 a year. However, a group of more sympathetic dons, under John Robert Seeley, raised a subscription which funded an unofficial lectureship in history and enhanced Browning's earnings by around £150 a year.

Browning believed that the function of the History school in King's was to educate future statesmen. He began a history course on Treaties, and was able to augment his income with fees from students attracted to the course. Browning's tutorials, held in his book-lined and lavishly decorated rooms, soon became famous; in the memory of one participant, "his talk was like a flow of molten lava that bore every kind of reminiscence on its tide". Within months of his arrival he had founded the Political Society, where students presented papers for discussion and criticism, thereby anticipating the role of the seminar as a feature of English university education.

He began other societies, in particular a group devoted to the music of Mozart which developed into a Musical Society to which leading contemporary performers were invited. He also instituted a regular series of "at homes" in his rooms, at which his students would be able to meet and converse with Browning's distinguished friends and acquaintances, who might include George Eliot, Walter Pater, or John Ruskin. These occasions provided a stimulating adjunct to the learning process which, Mark McBeth observes, "did not have to be unglamorous, mind-numbing, nor rigid; it could be entertaining as well as informative, and intellectually stimulating".

Using the 1874 Report of the Royal Commission on Oxford and Cambridge as a lever, (Note: This Commission, set up in January 1872, had as its brief "To inquire into the property and income belonging to, administered, or enjoyed by the Universities of Oxford and Cambridge and their Colleges and Halls, including prospects of increase or decrease of such property and income, and all matters of fact bearing on its state and circumstances.") Browning proposed a raft of reforms as to how King's should reorganise itself. He argued that the college should place the needs of its students at its centre, and should provide the resources to support a student "in any line of study that he might adopt", amid "companions most congenial to an industrious and able man". He compared King's unfavourably with its sister-college Trinity, and also suggested, undiplomatically, that the King's College provost should be paid less and his living accommodation made smaller. Though largely ignored at the time, many of Browning's ideas would be adopted in future years.

==== Building a reputation ====
In 1879 Browning became secretary of the Cambridge branch of the Oxbridge Teachers' Training Syndicate (TTS), formed the previous year with the object of bringing the training of teachers, at the time uncodified, into the purview of Oxford and Cambridge universities to provide a greater intellectual foundation for the profession. TTS students were not members of the university, but attended lectures and were examined and certificated by the university. Despite Browning's enthusiasm, the syndicate struggled to establish itself in the face of the university's general indifference to teacher education, but was warmly supported by the educationist and cleric George Ridding, who told Browning: "The existence of such a Syndicate as yours appears to me to give ... the best possible opportunity for consultative construction of a future Theory for higher education". Two years later Browning published his first major book on educational theory, History of Educational Theories, later translated into several languages and reprinted several times up to 1905. In 1883 he edited a new version of John Milton's Tractate of Education.

Browning was appointed to a formal King's College lectureship in 1880, and worked hard to establish himself as an academic historian. He published successful school textbooks on Modern England and Modern France, and edited a series of political memoranda and despatches from the Napoleonic era. He was elected to the Royal Historical Society in 1884, and was chairman of the society's council in 1885. During the following years he wrote prolifically, but his work did not bring him the scholastic recognition he hoped for. His books were regarded by his peers as slipshod and inaccurate, one critic writing: "If the reader is not particular about grammar and style, and is judiciously suspicious of dates, he, or more likely she, will derive both amusement and profit from Mr Browning's pages".

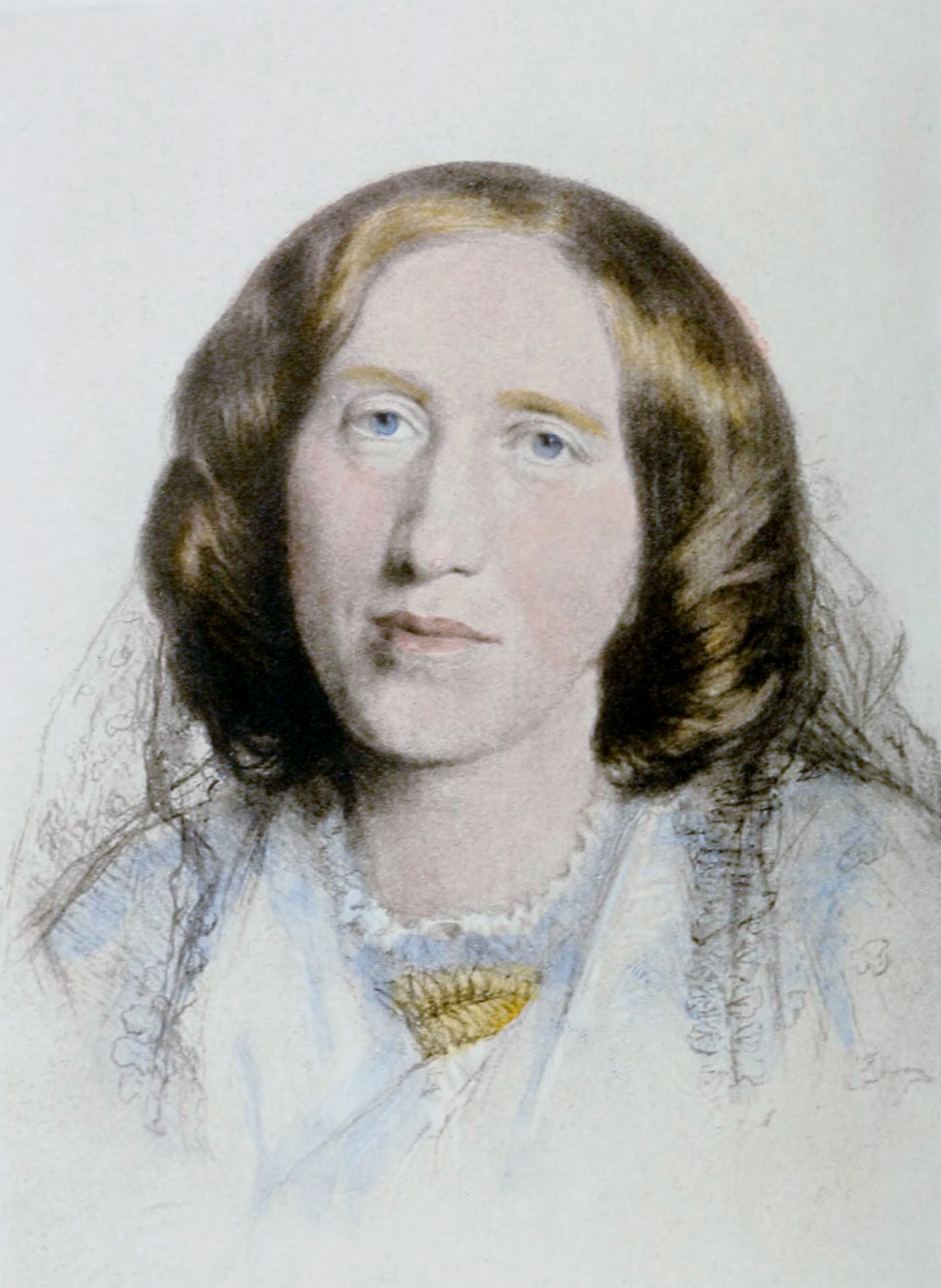
George Eliot

In 1880 Browning's long-time friend George Eliot (Mary Anne Evans) died; he was among the mourners at Highgate Cemetery when she was buried there on 29 December. Apart from his mother, she was the most influential woman in Browning's life; some of his acquaintances thought he wanted to marry her. He decided to honour her memory by writing her biography with, he said, "no claims to offer but a friendship of fifteen years, and a deep and unswerving devotion to her mind and character".

Published in 1890 as part of a series on Great Writers, it was Browning's most successful book, with 39 editions being issued up to 2012. He followed it up with two short literary lives, respectively of Dante Alighieri (published 1891), and Goethe (published 1892). By this time he had met and befriended Oscar Wilde, a friendship that lasted until Wilde's scandal and imprisonment in 1895, when Browning contributed to the fund set up by Wilde's friends to help pay his debts.

Browning was acquainted through meetings or correspondence with leading literary figures such as Alfred, Lord Tennyson, Algernon Swinburne, and the unrelated Robert Browning. According to the critic Noel Annan, writing in 1983, Oscar Browning introduced himself presumptuously to the Poet Laureate with the words "Hello, Tennyson, I'm Browning", and received the reply "No, you're not".

In 1881 Browning became treasurer of the Cambridge Union, a post he held for 21 years. In 1887 he became president of Footlights, serving until 1895. He also founded the Cambridge University Liberal Club in 1886, becoming its first Treasurer, and staying in post for a decade. During that time, he hosted a whole range of society events at his rooms in King's, from committee meetings and sherry parties to the larger "At Home" evenings which offered a rare chance for men and women in Cambridge to socialise together.

By 1888 he was sufficiently well known to be the subject of a caricature by W. B. Hayes ("Hay"), as one of the "Men of the Day", in the society magazine Vanity Fair. In 1886 Browning entered active politics as a Gladstonian Liberal; in that year's general election, as the Liberal Party's candidate in the South London constituency of Norwood, where he was heavily defeated. He fought two further elections, in 1892 at East Worcestershire and in 1895 at Liverpool West Derby, in each case losing by large majorities. (Note: Browning lost by 3384 votes to 1606 in Norwood, by 5,111 to 2,517 in East Worcestershire, and by 4,622 to 1,686 in West Derby; in East Worcestershire his victorious opponent was his former King's pupil, the future Conservative leader Austen Chamberlain.) (Note: Browning attributed his repeated defeats to voters confusing him with the poet Robert Browning.)

==== Day Training College ====
===== Inception =====
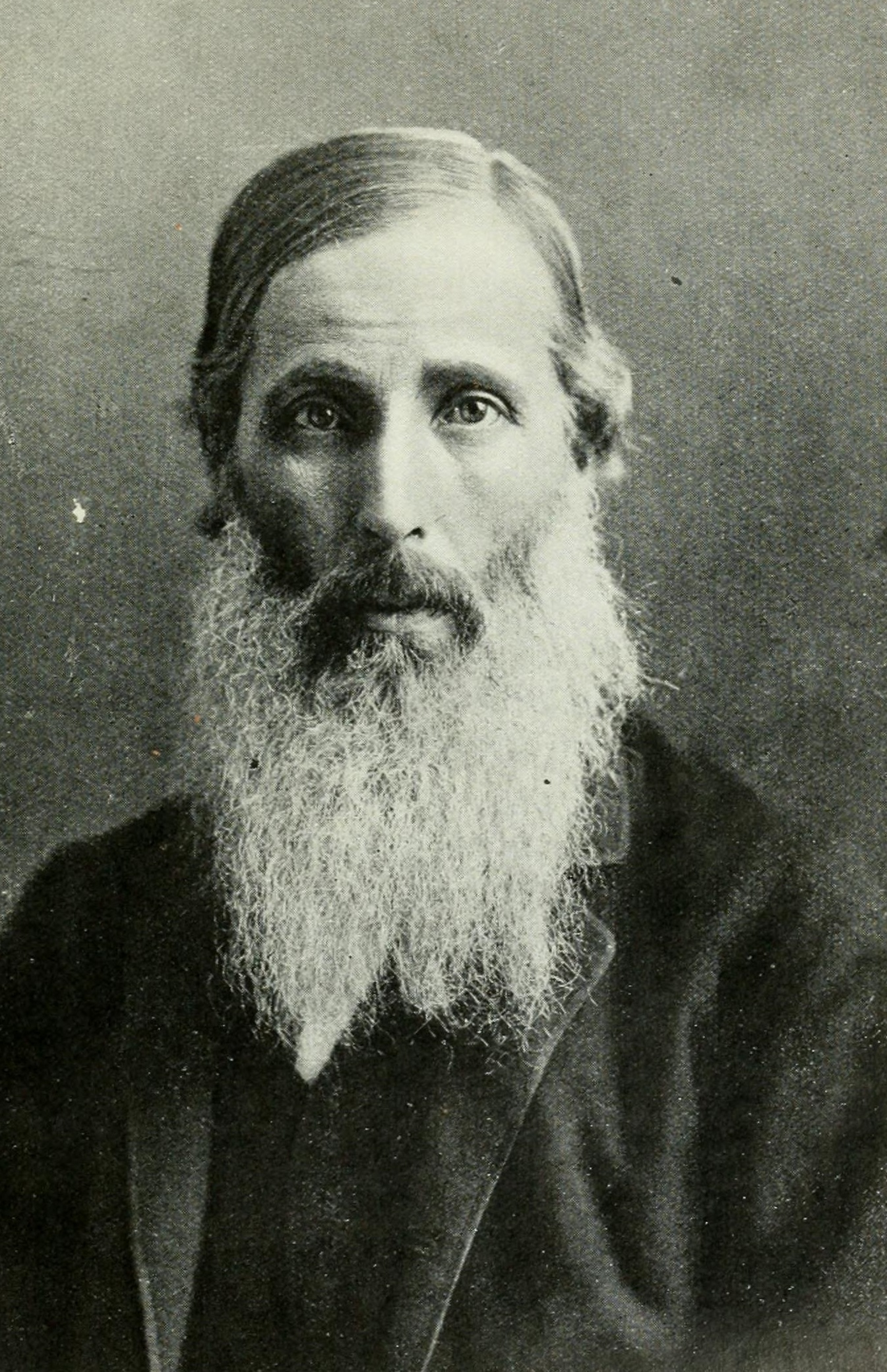
Henry Sidgwick, co-founder with Browning of the CUDTC

The Education Act, 1880 introduced compulsory education for children aged between five and ten. This greatly increased the demand for teachers and created a need for a better trained and more attractive teaching profession. Among the initiatives designed to meet this need was a government Code of Regulation issued in 1890, which led to the establishment of university-based day training colleges.

On 12 March 1891 Browning and his colleague Henry Sidgwick presented the Cambridge University Senate with a proposal to establish in Cambridge a Day Training College for elementary school teachers. The proposal received a "Grace" (provisional acceptance) from the Senate, on the basis of which Browning applied to the government's Education Department for approval to open the college. Permission was granted in August 1891, before the Senate's final assent. According to Browning, he and Sidgwick mutually decided not to wait, and declared the Cambridge University Day Training College (CUDTC) open in September 1891.

===== Growth =====
Browning became the CUDTC's first principal, with a nominal salary of £10 per year. The CUDTC was not a "college" in the conventional Cambridge sense; apart from a few registered as non-collegiate, most of its students were attached to colleges such as King's or Trinity, studying for Cambridge degrees alongside their CUDTC training. This heavy workload was made even more onerous by the university's regulation that all students had to pass a first-year examination in Latin and Greek, known as "Previous".

This examination was a significant hurdle to many of the students attracted to the CUDTC programme, as unlike most standard Cambridge entrants, they would not have studied classical languages at school. Browning's solution was to personally coach these students, to a level that would satisfy the requirements of "Previous". "In this manner", he stated, "we got our men through satisfactorily". As student numbers grew, a specialist classics lecturer was taken on by the DTC to help fulfil this task.

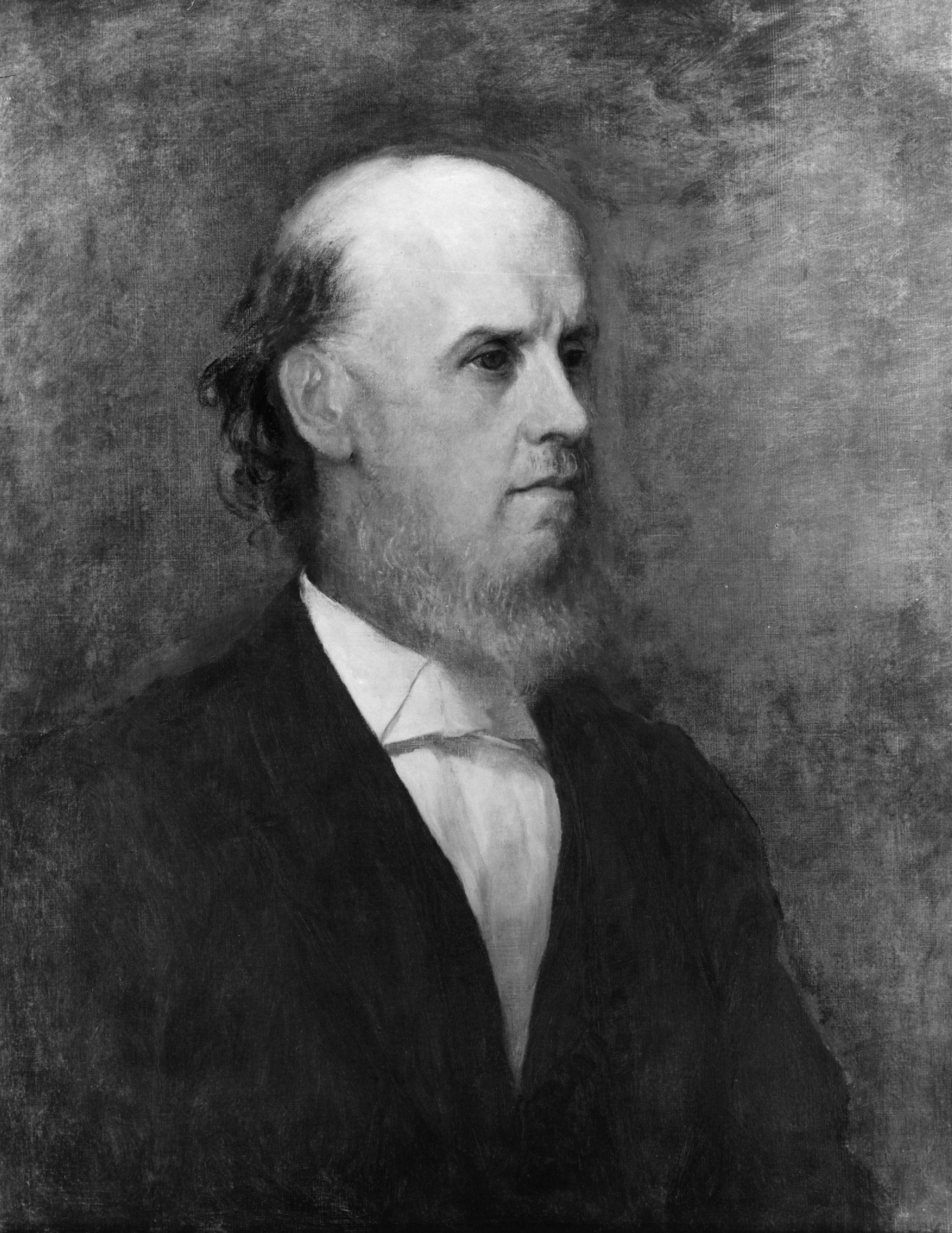
Samuel Barnett, whose fundraising helped to sustain the college in its early years

In its first year, 1891–92, the CUDTC registered just three students, rising to ten in its second year and twenty-two in its third. (Note: A photograph dated May 1893 shows Browning with one teaching colleague, posing with the ten CUDTC students. A later photograph dated 1909, at the end of Browning's tenure, indicates subsequent growth: Browning is surrounded by more than 60 students and staff.) Its classes were conducted by Browning and a team of part-time lecturers. For many students, funding was a severe problem. Browning constantly lobbied the university for financial support, which was sparsely given, and sought funds from outside organisations. In conjunction with Samuel Barnett, the founder of East London's Toynbee Hall settlement, he developed a student sponsorship scheme which had raised £385 (approximately £45,000 in 2017 terms) by 1893.

Initially, the CUDTC provided professional training opportunities only for elementary school teachers. Browning thought that the same training was relevant to secondary school teachers, although this was contrary to the traditional view of most secondary headmasters that university graduates did not require pedagogic training. Browning disagreed, arguing that the same pedagogic skills were required at all levels of teaching, whether in elementary, secondary or elite public schools. He proceeded cautiously, finally opening the CUDTC's doors to trainee secondary teachers in 1897.

Despite the continuing growth of the CUDTC, the university provided no administrative support facilities or teaching premises; teaching took place wherever Browning could find accommodation, while the college's office was in Browning's King's College rooms. In 1904 he was finally able to establish a permanent CUDTC headquarters at Warkworth House, a Victorian villa in Cambridge. The growth of the CUDTC ran alongside that of the Cambridge Training College for Women (CTC), founded in 1884 by Elizabeth Hughes.

The two principals maintained a professional relationship that the educational historians Pam Hirsch and Mark McBeth describe as "symbiotic", although one observer asserted that there was "no cordiality whatever between the two". In his memoirs, Browning refers to Hughes as "my old friend and enemy". Their respective training colleges shared facilities and examinations and were to an extent interdependent; they acted as "flagships which had a material effect on raising the profile of education and teacher training in the United Kingdom".

===== Success and decline =====
A government inspector's report on the CUDTC in 1900 recorded increases in numbers and efficiency – "but more rapidly in efficiency than numbers". A subsequent inspection in 1903 produced more fulsome praise: "The [students'] teaching exhibited manliness, independence and resource. The students were no longer the hobbled boys of the elementary teacher type. They were real members of the University."

In his memoirs, Browning attempted to quantify CUDTC's successes. He claimed that by 1907, 40 percent of its students had obtained first or second-class honours in their university degrees, 28 per cent had gained third-class honours, 24 per cent had ordinary degrees, and 8 per cent were unaccounted for. All but a small handful of ex-students, he said, were engaged in educational work, as elementary or secondary teachers, training college lecturers, or government inspectors.

In 1909, when Browning was past 70, he reluctantly retired from the CUDTC principalship. The college continued, but without Browning's force and drive its reputation declined. In the inter-war years the university's interest in teacher training withered, and by 1939 the CUDTC had ceased to exist as a distinct entity; it had "fall[en] to a sort of un-noticed death", according to Hirsch and McBeth.

=== Later Cambridge years ===
Alongside his CUDTC role, Browning continued his various university duties. In 1895 he received the first of several late-career disappointments when he failed to be appointed as Regius Professor of History in succession to Sir John Seeley. The appointment, in the gift of the prime minister, Lord Rosebery, went instead to Lord Acton, evidently on the grounds that Browning's scholarship lacked sufficient depth. On 17 November 1896, after a series of complaints about Browning's overbearing manner, "imperial conduct" and bullying behaviour, he was forced to resign as Treasurer of Cambridge University Liberal Club, of which he was the founder. Browning was uncharacteristically reduced to tears when confronted with his behaviour and given little alternative but to resign.

Browning continued to produce historical works: a study of Peter the Great in 1898 was followed by a History of Europe in 1901. He also provided an introduction to the 1900 edition of Woodrow Wilson's notable textbook The State. In 1900 a formal portrait of Browning was painted by the Spanish artist Ignacio Zuloaga, one of numerous portraits and caricatures made in Browning's later life. (Note: Anstruther lists fifteen drawings or paintings, and three sculptures, the majority of them made after 1887; all those prior to that date are listed as untraced or missing.)

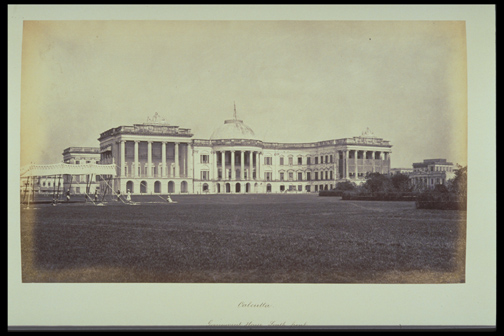
Government House, Calcutta, which Browning visited as Curzon's guest in 1902

In 1898 Browning's former Eton pupil, George Curzon, was appointed Viceroy of Ireland and raised to the Irish peerage as Baron Curzon of Kedleston. In 1902, Curzon invited Browning to India, as his guest at Government House in Calcutta. For five weeks Browning lived and travelled in great style; on his return he wrote an account of his trip, Impressions of Indian Travel (1903). Further disappointments awaited him at Cambridge. After 21 years' service, he was replaced as treasurer of the Cambridge Union. In November 1902, he failed to be re-elected to King's College Council, a place he had occupied for decades.

In February 1904 his application for a Doctorate of Letters (D.Litt) was rejected. Despite the quantity and popularity of his books, he was considered more a journalist than a scholar. A year later, Browning's private hopes of becoming provost of King's were dashed when M. R. James was appointed to the vacancy. One of James's earliest actions as provost was to advise Browning in 1906 that his history lectureship would not be renewed after three further years.

With his Cambridge days drawing to a close, Browning acquired a holiday home in the small seaside town of Bexhill. When not in Cambridge or travelling, he entered into the life of the town, playing golf, attending concerts, giving lectures and entertaining his friends. After meeting an eminent Christian Scientist, Daniel Mayer, on the train to Bexhill, Browning became a convert and a regular attendee of the sect's meetings, while remaining a member of the Church of England. In 1909, no longer the CUDTC principal and with his King's lectureship terminated, he saw no further reason for remaining in Cambridge and retired to his home in Bexhill.

=== Retirement, Rome, death ===
Browning's stipend and pension, totalling about £700 a year (roughly £75,000 in 2017 terms), enabled him to enjoy a comfortable lifestyle in retirement. He visited the Middle East, and also Russia where he lectured on the "Ideals of Education" to the St Petersburg Guild of English Teachers. Each year he took extended holidays in Italy. When not travelling he was busy writing: his memoirs, Memories of Sixty Years at Eton, Cambridge, and Elsewhere appeared in 1910, and a History of the Modern World, 1815–1910 was published the following year. He also wrote poetry, including (in Latin) an "Ode to the Penis" which, he informed his friend Lord Latymer was "superficially rather smutty, but intrinsically very religious and spiritual".

The First World War began in August 1914, while Browning was in Italy. His offer to return to England as a stand-in teacher for those called to military service was ignored and he decided to remain in Rome. Here he enjoyed an agreeable life in the English colony, listening to music, serving on various committees and acting as President of the British Academy of Arts. He continued writing, publishing A General History of the World in 1915, and A Short History of Italy two years later.

After the end of the war, Browning wrote to Curzon, who in 1919 was serving as Britain's Foreign Secretary, asking if Curzon could secure him a knighthood – he thought he deserved it for his services to British-Italian relations. Curzon could not deliver this; four years later, in the final months of his life, Browning was appointed to a lower honour, an OBE.

Shortly before his death, Browning completed a second volume of memoirs, Memories of Later Years (1923). He died in Rome on 6 October 1923 after a short illness. His ashes were returned to Cambridge and placed in a vault within King's College chapel.

== Appraisal ==
In his biography, Anstruther stresses the complexity of Browning's character, in which intelligence, wit, and a real love of youth combined with conceit, laziness, insensitivity and trouble-making. "The needle on the balance swings back and forth violently between good and bad". This dual nature is reflected in the comments of Browning's obituarists: according to the Manchester Guardian, "no man [was] more difficult to characterise nor more easy to misunderstand". The writer concedes that his aims generally exceeded his achievements, but acknowledges him as "a man of great power and force ... possessed of a thorough knowledge of the world, with immense kindness of heart".

Noel Annan, in a 1983 pen-picture, describes Browning as "preposterous" and "a cracking snob" but recognises Browning's pioneer work in the field of teacher training: "He saw that what the desperately poor young men who came to learn to teach in the State schools needed more than anything was encouragement. Shoals of letters from them and their parents showed what he meant to them".

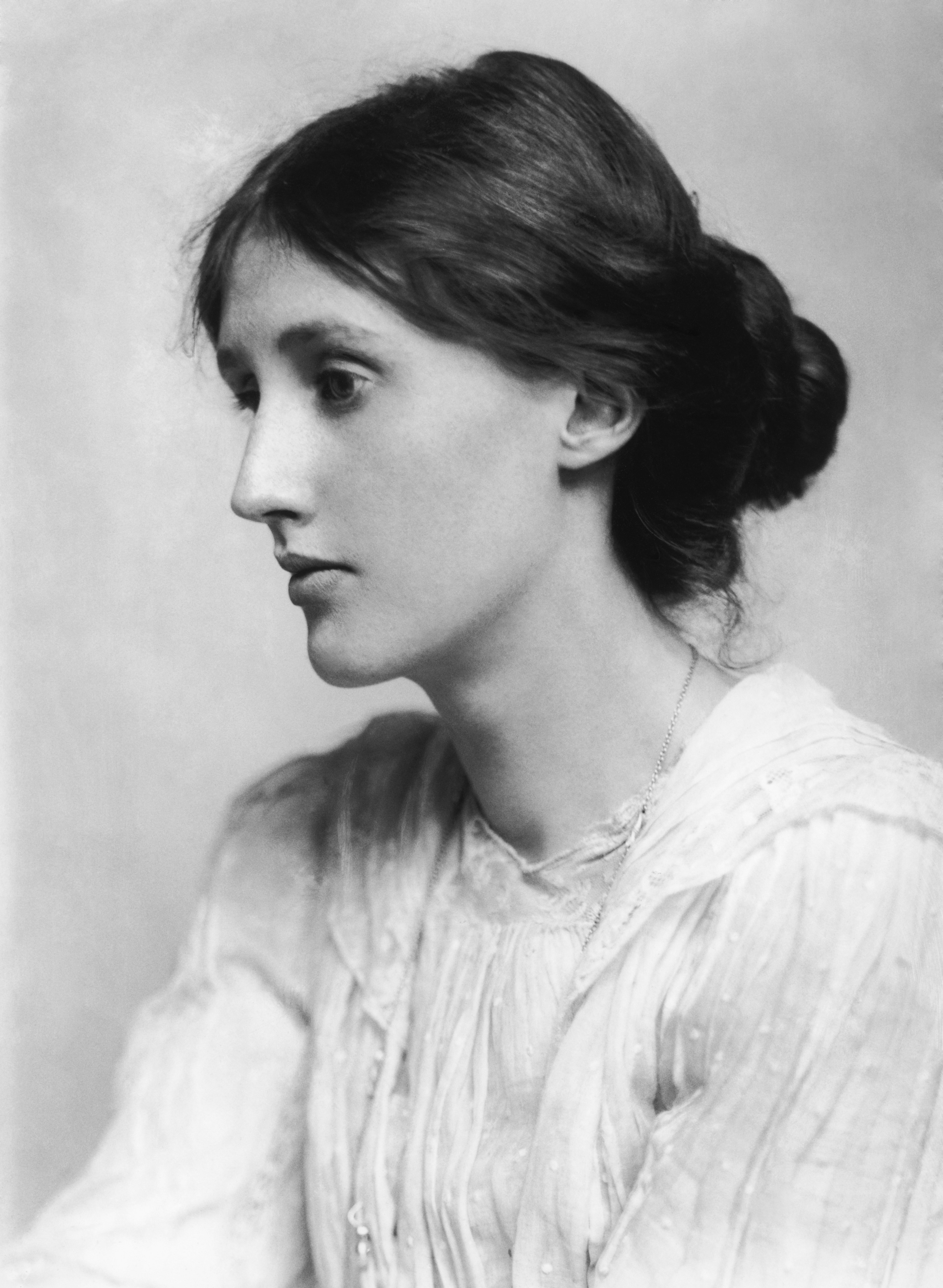
Virginia Woolf

In her 1929 essay A Room of One's Own, the writer Virginia Woolf depicted Browning as a misogynist, a personification of the patriarchal system which restricted women's educational opportunities. Invoking a passage from Wortham's biography, Woolf wrote: "Mr Oscar Browning was wont to declare that ... irrespective of the marks that he might give, the best woman was intellectually the inferior of the worst man". (Note: The full text from Wortham from which Woolf quoted reads: "He regarded [aesthetes] with the same catholic and beneficient eye that he turned on Nonconformists, who were 'the salt of Cambridge', on Indians, on Jews whose demands for exemption from the paper in the Little-Go on Paley's Evidence of Christianity he championed, on the Cinderellas of the University, the non-Collegiate students, and lastly on the Newnhamites and Girtonites who, if gawky, yet stood for the cause of women's education, in which he had already been actively interested at Eton, that cause of which his friend Henry Sidgwick was 'the high priest'. Nevertheless, in this he was an ungallant Liberal and was wont to declare that the impression left on his mind, after looking over any set of examination papers, was that irrespective of the marks he might give, the best woman was intellectually the inferior of the worst man".) The feminist scholar Jane Marcus, writing in 1985, characterised Browning as "the great misogynist of his age, the heroic figure of the man with his finger in the dike against the rising tide of female education...[He] held the unofficial Chair of Applied Misogyny at Cambridge for many years".

Hirsch and Peters, however, record that whatever his expressed prejudices, Browning took practical steps to support and develop educational opportunities for women and aid their educational advancement. A letter to Browning from Sidgwick suggests that Browning supported the then highly unfashionable idea that full Cambridge degrees should be awarded to women, a proposal that was not enacted until 1948. Furthermore, when the Political Society debated a motion in support of women's suffrage, Browning voted in favour.

In his professional life Browning maintained discretion and decorum; according to Davenport-Hinds: "His eccentricities enabled his protégés to share emotional intimacy without impermissible sexual contact". Beyond his Cambridge life, Browning acquired a set of rooms in St James's Street, London, a base from which he entertained a variety of mainly working-class boys and men, over many years: "Any youth whom OB liked", says Anstruther, "to whom he thought he could do a kindness, perhaps in exchange for a little amusement, arrived, stayed and went away". Browning treated these acquaintances well, with generous gifts and hospitality, but as with the favourites from his Eton schoolmastering days, they were liable to be dropped without ceremony when Browning tired of them.

Although Browning was recognised as a gifted teacher, he acquired no standing as a scholar. Nevertheless, modern historians have recognised that his work in teacher education provided a foundation for the university's present-day Faculty of Education, However, whereas Elizabeth Hughes's memory is perpetuated through Hughes Hall, Browning's contribution to education has no official recognition in Cambridge or elsewhere. According to Hirsch and McBeth, "people knew who he was but not what he did". Thus he is remembered more as a "character", a flamboyant, faintly ridiculous figure; such characterisation, say Hirsch and McBeth, has "blurred and distorted any serious account of his achievements".

== Works ==
Browning's writings comprise historical works, mainly of the popular variety. He also wrote on educational matters, completed several literary biographies, and completed two volumes of memoirs.

== Notes and references ==
=== Sources ===
- Anstruther, Ian (1983). Oscar Browning: a biography. London: John Murray. ISBN 978-0-71954-078-3.
- Ashton, Rosemary (1996). George Eliot: a Life. London: Hamish Hamilton. ISBN 978-0-241-13473-3.
- Browning, Oscar (1892). Life of George Eliot. London: Walter Scott Ltd.
- Browning, Oscar (1910). Memories of Sixty Years at Eton, Cambridge, and Elsewhere. London: John Lane The Bodley Head. OCLC 558228480.
- Browning, Oscar (1923). Memories of Later Years. London: T. Fisher Unwin. OCLC 558228472.
- Card, Tim (1994). Eton Renewed. London: John Murray. ISBN 978-0-7195-5309-7.
- Card, Tim (25 May 2006). "Warre, Edmond". Oxford Dictionary of National Biography (online ed.). Oxford University Press. doi:10.1093/ref:odnb/36751. (Subscription, Wikipedia Library access or UK public library membership required.)
- Clarendon, 4th Earl of (1864). Report of Her Majesty's Commissioners appointed to inquire into the Revenues and Management of certain Colleges and Schools, and the Studies pursued and Instruction given therein. London: HM Stationery Office.
- Craig, F.W.S., ed. (1974). British Parliamentary Election Results 1885–1918. Chichester: Parliamentary Research Service. ISBN 978-0-900178-27-6.
- Davenport-Hines, Richard (3 January 2008). "Browning, Oscar". Oxford Dictionary of National Biography (online ed.). Oxford University Press. doi:10.1093/ref:odnb/32128. (Subscription, Wikipedia Library access or UK public library membership required.)
- Hirsch, Pam; McBeth, Mark (2004). Teacher Training at Cambridge: The Initiatives of Oscar Browning and Elizabeth Hughes. London: Psychology Press. ISBN 978-0-713-00234-8.
- McDonald, Deborah (2007). The Prince, His Tutor and the Ripper. London: McFarland. ISBN 978-0-78643-018-5.
- Marcus, Jane (Spring 1985). "Reviewed Work: Oscar Browning: A Biography by Ian Anstruther". Victorian Studies. 28 (3): 556–558. JSTOR 3827325. (subscription required)
- Marcus, Jane (1987). "Taking the Bull by the Udders: Sexual Difference in Virginia Woolf – a Conspiracy Theory". In Marcus, Jane (ed.). Virginia Woolf and Bloomsbury. London: Palgrave Macmillan. ISBN 978-0-333-39398-7.
- Richardson, Edmund (2013). Classical Victorians: Scholars, Scoundrels and Generals in Pursuit of Antiquity. Cambridge: Cambridge University Press. ISBN 978-1-13962-010-9.
- Ridding, George (1882). Examination in theory v. normal schools as the training for teachers: a letter to Oscar Browning. Cambridge: Macmillan & Co.
- Searby, Peter (1982). The Training of Teachers at Cambridge University: The First Sixty Years. Cambridge: Cambridge University Department of Education. OCLC 476267918.
- Thévoz, Seth Alexander (Summer 2016). "Cambridge University Liberal Club, 1886-1916: A Study in Early Student Political Organisation". Journal of Liberal History (91). Archived from the original on 9 January 2019.
- Woolf, Virginia (1957). A Room of One's Own. New York: Harcourt Brace Jovanovich. OCLC 320604398.
- Wilkinson, L.P. (1980). Kingsmen of a Century 1873–1972. Cambridge: King's College. ISBN 978-0-9502450-4-1.
- Wortham, H.E. (1956). Victorian Eton and Cambridge: Being the life and times of Oscar Browning. London: Barker. OCLC 593253811.
