= Majer =

Majer (Czech and Slovak feminine Majerová) is a surname, Slavic version of German surnames Maier and Mayer. Notable people with the surname include:

- Damjan Majer (born 1969), Slovenian archer
- Elisa Majer Rizzioli (1880–1930), Italian fascist politician
- Janusz Majer (born 1946), Polish mountain climber
- Josef Majer (1925–2013), Czechoslovak footballer
- Joseph Friedrich Bernhard Caspar Majer (1689–1768), German musician and author
- Lajos Májer (1956–1998), Hungarian footballer
- Lovro Majer (born 1998), Croatian footballer
- Margaret Majer (1898–1990), American physical education instructor
- Marie Majerová (1882–1967), Czech writer
- Milán Májer (born 1999), Hungarian footballer
- Rochelle Majer Krich, writer
- Ryszard Majer (born 1971), Polish politician, academic teacher and local official
- Stefan Majer (1929–2020), Polish basketball player and coach
- Žan Majer (born 1992), Slovenian footballer
