= Roland Mayer =

Roland Mayer may refer to:

- Roland Mayer, member of the Red Army Faction
- Roland Mayer, co-creator of the Gumpert Apollo and former chief of Audi Sport
- Roland Mayer (classicist), emeritus professor of Classics and specialist in Latin literature and Roman culture
