= Charles Maier =

Charles Maier may refer to:

- Charles Robertson Maier (born 1945), Canadian historian, officer of arms
- Charles S. Maier (born 1939), professor of history at Harvard University

== See also ==
- Charles Mayer (disambiguation)
- Charles Meyer (disambiguation)
