= James Meyer =

James or Jim Meyer may refer to:

- James H. Meyer (born 1943), member of the Illinois House of Representatives, 1993–2009
- James Henry Meyer (1922–2002), chancellor of the University of California, Davis, 1969–1987
- James Meyer (footballer) (born 1986), Australian soccer player
- James Meyer (cricketer) (born 1966), English cricketer
- Jim Meyer (born 1963), offensive tackle for the Green Bay Packers, 1987

== See also ==
- Meyer (surname)
- James Mayer (disambiguation)
- James Myer (born 1951), American filmmaker
