= Hans Meyer =

Hans Meyer may refer to:

- Hans Meyer (artist) (1846–1919), German artist and engraver
- Hans Horst Meyer (1853–1939), German pharmacologist
- Hans Meyer (geographer) (1858–1929), German geographer
- Hans Leopold Meyer (1871–1942), Austrian chemist
- Hans Joseph Meyer (1913–2009), teacher at Bunce Court School
- Hans Meyer (SS officer), Knight's Cross recipient, see List of Knight's Cross of the Iron Cross recipients
- Hans Meyer (actor) (1925–2020), South African actor
- Hans Joachim Meyer (1936–2024), German politician
- Hans Meyer (footballer) (born 1942), German football manager and former player
- Hans Werner Meyer (born 1964), German film and television actor

== See also ==
- Hans Mayer (disambiguation)
- Hannes Meyer (1889–1954), Swiss Bauhaus architect
- Hans Meier (1918–2007), German officer, recipient of the Knights Cross
- Jean Améry (Hanns Chaim Mayer, 1912–1978), Auschwitz survivor and Holocaust writer
