= Michael Myers =

Michael Myers or Mike Myers may refer to:

- Michael Myers (New York politician) (1753–1814), American politician from New York
- Michael Myers (judge) (1873–1950), sixth Chief Justice of the Supreme Court of New Zealand
- Michael Myers (Pennsylvania politician) (born 1943), American politician from Pennsylvania
- Michael Myers (songwriter), British songwriter
- Michael Myers (Halloween), a fictional character and antagonist in the Halloween film series
- Mike Myers (born 1963), American-Canadian actor, comedian, screenwriter and film producer
- Mike Myers (baseball) (born 1969), American Major League Baseball pitcher
- Michael Myers (American football) (born 1976), National Football League defensive tackle
- Michael Myers (racing driver) (born 2001), American race car driver

== See also ==
- Mike Mayers (born 1991), American Major League Baseball pitcher
- Mike Meyers
- Michael Mayer (disambiguation)
- Michael Meyer (disambiguation)
