= Andreas Meyer =

Andreas Meyer may refer to:

- Andreas Meyer (ice hockey) (born 1954), Swiss ice hockey defenceman
- Andreas Meyer (manager) (born 1961), Swiss manager and lawyer
- Andreas Meyer-Hanno (1932–2006), German opera director
- Andreas Meyer-Landrut (born 1929), German diplomat
- Andreas Meyer, recording artist under the name Forma Tadre

== See also ==
- Andreas Mayer (disambiguation)
