= Christian Meyer =

Christian Meyer may refer to:

- Christian Meyer (cyclist) (born 1969), retired track cyclist from Germany
- Christian Meyer (ski jumper) (born 1977), retired Norwegian ski jumper
- Christian Meyer (politician) (born 1975), German politician
- Christian Meyer (footballer) (born 1968), retired German association football player
- Christian Meyer (musicologist) (born 1952), French musicologist

== See also ==
- Christian Meier (disambiguation)
- Christian Mayer (disambiguation)
