= James Mayer =

James, Jim, or Jamie Mayer may refer to:

- James M. Mayer (born 1958), American inorganic chemist
- James W. Mayer (1930–2013), American applied physicist
- James Mayer (spy) (1920–1944), Mauritian secret agent during World War II
- Jim Mayer (musician) (born c. 1961), American guitarist, singer-songwriter, and producer
- James Erskine Mayer (1889–1957), American baseball player with the Philadelphia Phillies, the Pittsburgh Pirates, and the Chicago White Sox
- Jamie Mayer (born 1977), Scottish former professional rugby player
- Jim Mayer (ice hockey) (born 1954), Canadian ice hockey player

== See also ==
- James Mayer de Rothschild (1792–1868), German-French banker and the founder of the French branch of the Rothschild family
- Mayer (name)
- James Meyer (disambiguation)
- James Myer (born 1951), American filmmaker
