= Charles Meyer =

Charles Meyer may refer to:

- Charles Meyer (cyclist) (1868–1931), Danish cyclist
- Monk Meyer (Charles Robert Meyer, 1911–2001), American brigadier general
- Charles A. Meyer (1918–1996), U.S. Assistant Secretary of State for Inter-American Affairs from 1969 to 1973
- Charles Mayer (composer) (1799–1862), or Meyer, Prussian pianist and composer

== See also ==
- Charles Mayer (disambiguation)
- Charles Maier (disambiguation)
