= Christian Meier (disambiguation) =

Christian Meier (born 1970) is a Peruvian actor and singer.

Christian Meier may also refer to:

- Christian Meier (historian) (born 1929), German historian
- Christian Meier (cyclist) (born 1985), Canadian racing cyclist

== See also ==
- Meier (disambiguation)
- Christian Meyer (disambiguation)
- Christian Mayer (disambiguation)
