= Fred Meyer (disambiguation) =

Fred Meyer, Inc. is an American company founded in Portland, Oregon by Fred G. Meyer.

Fred or Frederick Meyer may also refer to:

- Fred G. Meyer (1886–1978), German-born American businessman, founder of the Fred Meyer hypermarket chain
- Fred Meyer (wrestler) (1900–1983), American Olympic wrestler
- Fred Meyer (gymnast) (1910–1996), American gymnast
- Fred Meyer Jewelers, an American chain of jewelers; a wholly owned subsidiary of Fred Meyer, Inc.
- Fred Meyer (American football) (1919–1996), American football player
- Fred Meyer (politician), member of the Nebraska Legislature
- Frederick H. Meyer (disambiguation)
  - Frederick Meyer (1872–1961), German-born American designer and art educator
  - Frederick Herman Meyer (1876–1961), American architect
- F. B. Meyer (Frederick Brotherton Meyer), Baptist pastor and evangelist in England
- Freddy Meyer (Frederick A. Meyer IV), American ice hockey defenseman

== See also ==
- Fred Meijer (1919–2011), American businessman of Dutch descent, chairman of the Meijer hypermarket chain
- Fredrik Meyer (1916–1989), Norwegian sailor
- Fred Mayer (disambiguation)
- Fred Meyers (born 1983), American actor
- Fred L. Myers, founder of Myers's Rum
- Fred Myers (born c. 1948), American anthropologist
- Frederic Myers (1811–1851), English clergyman and author
- Frederic W. H. Myers (1843–1901), English poet, classicist, philologist, and psychic researcher
