= Richard Meyer =

Richard Meyer may refer to:

- Richard Meyer (composer) (born 1957), American composer, teacher, and strings editor
- Richard Meyer (academic) (born 1966), writer and professor of art history at Stanford University
- Richard Meyer (Fatal Fury), a character in the Fatal Fury fighting video games
- Richard Meyer (folk music) (1952–2012), American folk musician and writer/editor of folk publications
- Richard Meyer (mathematician) (1919–2008), German mathematician and aerospace engineer
- Richard Meyer (producer) (born 1970), Swiss record producer and songwriter
- Richard Meyer (tennis) (born 1955), American tennis player
- Richard A. Meyer, American businessman
- Richard C. Meyer (1920–1985), German-American television and film editor
- Richard C. Meyer, American Comicsgate leader
- Richard E. Meyer (1939–1992), American businessman and record producer

== See also ==
- Richard Mayer (disambiguation)
- Dick Mayer (1924–1989), golfer
- Rich Meyer (born 1985), American bassist
- Richard Meier (born 1934), American architect
- Richard L. Meier (1920–2007), American regional planner, systems theorist, scientist, urban scholar, and futurist
- Ric Meyers (born 1953), contributor to the Martial Arts film industry, and FanimeCon panelist
