= Frederick H. Meyer =

Frederick H. Meyer may refer to:

- Frederick Meyer (Frederick Heinrich Wilhelm Meyer, 1872–1961), German-born American furniture designer, art school founder, and art educator
- Frederick Herman Meyer (1876–1961), American architect

== See also ==
- Frederick Meyer (disambiguation)
