= Charles Robertson Maier =

Canadian officer of arms (born 1945)

Charles R. Maier PhD CStJ CD FRSA FRHSC
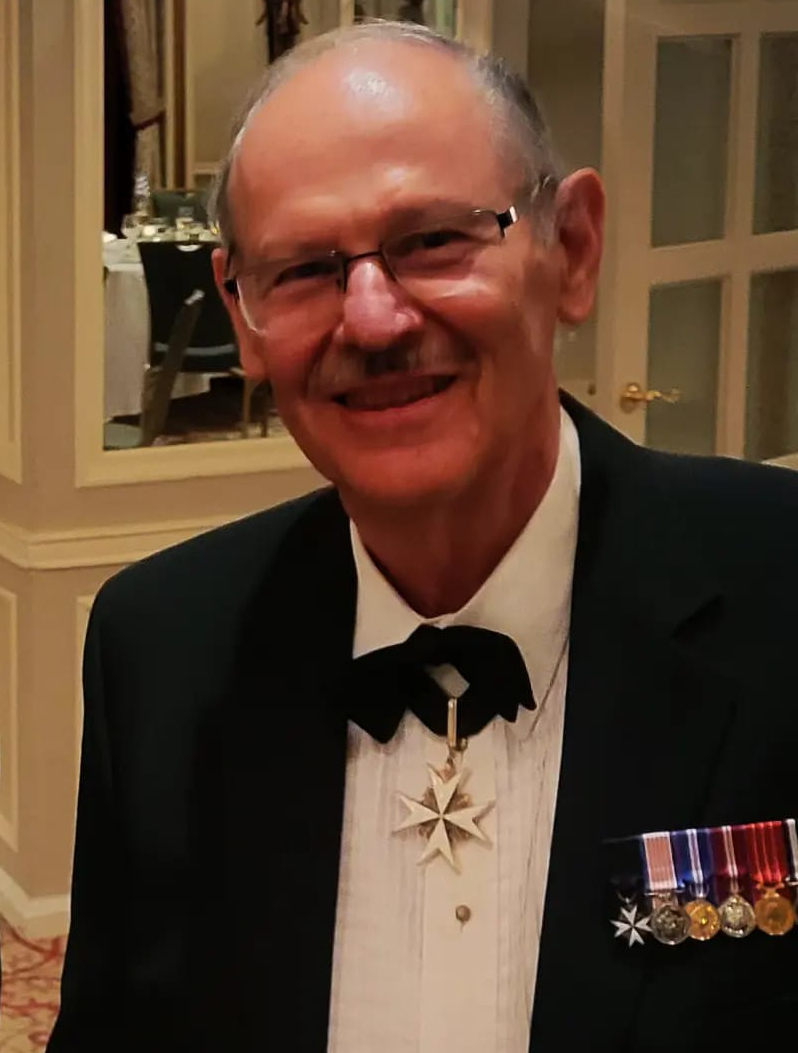
- Maier in 2022 at a RHSC event at the Château Laurier in Ottawa.

Athabaska Herald
- In office 1988 – 2001
- Monarch: Elizabeth II
- Governors General: Jeanne Sauvé; Ray Hnatyshyn; Roméo LeBlanc; Adrienne Clarkson

Personal details
- Born: 1945 (age 80–81)
- Spouse: Valerie Wright (m. 1974)
- Children: 4
- Education: University of British Columbia (B.A.), King's College London, University of London (M.A.).
- Occupation: Civil servant
- Profession: Officer of arms

Charles Robertson Maier (born 1945) is a retired Canadian officer of arms and the former Priory Historian for St John Ambulance's Priory of Canada.

== Life and career ==
Maier was born in St. Louis, Missouri in 1945. He received a Bachelor of Arts in 1969 from the University of British Columbia and a Master of Arts in 1970 from King's College London, University of London. After being an executive trainee with the Hudson's Bay Company, Maier joined the British Columbia Historic Parks System as an Information & Education Officer in 1975. Maier was Government Records Archivist for the Yukon Territory from 1981 until 1988.

In 1988, Maier was commissioned Athabaska Herald as one of the three inaugural heralds at the Canadian Heraldic Authority alongside Robert Watt and Auguste Vachon, a post in which he served until 2001. After his tenure as Athabaska Herald, Maier served as Chief of Ceremonial and Protocol in the Department of Public Works and Government Services until he retired from the Canadian Federal Public Service in 2006.

Maier was also commissioned as a reservist officer with the Canadian Armed Forces to assist in his son’s Air Cadet Squadron, where he served as the founding commanding officer of a francophone Army Cadet Corps established at Casselman, Ontario. In this role he also assisted Army Public Affairs on a number of visual identity projects.

== Personal life ==
Maier married Valerie Wright in 1974. Together, Maier and his wife are the parents of three sons and one daughter.

Since 1972, Maier has been a member of the Royal Heraldry Society of Canada. He has served since March 2022 as president of the Society's Ottawa Valley Branch and he further served from May 2023 to April 2025 as the Second Vice President of the Society at large.

== Honours ==
Maier was made a fellow of the Royal Heraldry Society of Canada in 1991 during his tenure as Athabaska Herald.

=== Canadian medals, orders, and decorations ===
Ribbon	Description	Notes	Ref
	Commander of the Order of St. John	Appointed Commander in 2005	
	Queen Elizabeth II Golden Jubilee Medal for Canada	Awarded in 2002	
	Queen Elizabeth II Diamond Jubilee Medal for Canada	Awarded in 2012	
	Canadian Forces' Decoration		

=== Arms ===
Coat of arms of Charles Robertson Maier
Adopted November 12, 1975 (grant from the College of Arms); July 20, 2023 (registered by the Canadian Heraldic Authority) Crest A demi-wolf Sable gorged with an antique crown, holding between the forepaws a sun in splendour Or and issuant from a circlet of maple leaves Gules and oak leaves Or Escutcheon Gules a sun in splendour between three oak leaves fructed Or Motto Proceed Symbolism The sun is an important feature of the arms of British Columbia, symbolizing Mr. Maier's ties to that province. Being a hardwood tree, the oak—represented here by its leaves—alludes to the enduring strength of his family. The wolf refers to the wolf heads that frequently appear in coats of arms associated with the name Robertson, Mr. Maier's middle name. The antique crown is taken from the arms of British Columbia.

== See also ==
- Canadian Heraldic Authority
- Royal Heraldry Society of Canada
- Herald

Heraldic offices
New title	Athabaska Herald; 1988 – 2001	None
