= Fred Mayer =

Fred Mayer may refer to:

- Fred Shaw Mayer (1899–1989), Australian ornithologist
- Frederick Mayer (1921–2006), German educational scientist
- Frederick Mayer (spy) (1921–2016), American spy during World War II
- Fred Mayer (photographer) (1933–2021), Swiss photographer
- Frederic Mayer (1931–2013), American operatic tenor

== See also ==
- Fred L. Myers, founder of Myers's Rum
- Fred Myers (born c. 1948), American anthropologist
- Fred Meyer (disambiguation)
- Mayer (disambiguation)
