= Andreas Mayer =

Andreas Mayer may refer to:

- Andreas Mayer (footballer, born 1972), German footballer
- Andreas Mayer (footballer, born 1980), German footballer
- Andreas Mayer (politician) (born 1995), German politician

== See also ==
- Andreas Meyer (disambiguation)
