= Christopher Mayer =

Christopher or Chris Mayer may refer to:

- Christopher Mayer (American actor) (1954–2011), American film and TV actor
- Christopher J. Mayer (born circa 1965), American economist
- Chris Mayer (field hockey) (born 1968), British Olympic field hockey player in 1996
- Chris Mayer (musician), Romanian musician and DJ in End-Year Chart 2010 (Romania)

== See also ==
- Christopher Meyer (1944–2022), British diplomat
