= Robert Mayer =

Robert Mayer may refer to:

- Robert Mayer (ice hockey) (born 1989), Swiss ice hockey goaltender
- Robert Mayer (philanthropist) (1879–1985), German-born British philanthropist
- Robert Mayer (politician) (born 1957), president pro tem of the Missouri Senate
- Robert A. Mayer (1933–2008), director of George Eastman House
- Robert Mayer (journalist), author of the novel Superfolks (1977)
- Bob Mayer (author) (born 1959)
- Julius Robert von Mayer (1814–1878), German physician and physicist, and one of the founders of thermodynamics

== See also ==
- Robert Mayer – der Arzt aus Heilbronn, a 1955 East German film
- Haldane Robert Mayer (born 1941), Senior United States Circuit Judge of the United States Court of Appeals for the Federal Circuit
