= Karl Mayer =

Karl Mayer may refer to:

- Karl Mayer (poet) (1786–1870), German jurist
- Karl Ulrich Mayer (born 1945), German sociologist
- Karl Mayer-Eymar (1826–1907), Franco-Swiss paleontologist and geologist
- Karl Mayer (Desperate Housewives), a character on Desperate Housewives
