= Hans Mayer (disambiguation) =

Hans Mayer (1907–2001), German Jewish literary critic.

Hans Mayer may also refer to:

- Hans Ferdinand Mayer (1895–1980), German electrical engineer and author of the Oslo Report
- Hans Eberhard Mayer, 20th-century historian of medieval topics

== See also ==
- Hans Meyer (disambiguation)
- Hannes Meyer (1889–1954), Swiss Bauhaus architect
- Hans Meier (1918–2007), German officer, recipient of the Knights Cross
- Hans-Karl Mayer (1911–1940), German Luftwaffe military aviator
- Hans-Peter Mayer (born 1944), German politician
- Jean Améry (Hanns Chaim Mayer, 1912–1978), Auschwitz survivor and Holocaust writer
