= Mike-Mayer =

Mike-Mayer is a surname. Notable people with the surname include:

- Nick Mike-Mayer (born 1950), American football player
- Steve Mike-Mayer (born 1947), American football player

== See also ==
- Mike Mayer, American writer
- Michael Mayer (disambiguation)
- Mike (disambiguation)
- Mayer (disambiguation)
