= Lucas Mayer =

Lucas Mayer may refer to:

- Lucas Mayer (handballer) (born 1983), Austrian handball player
- Lucas Mayer (basketball) (born 1999), German basketball player
