= Wilhelm Mayer =

Wilhelm Mayer may refer to:

- Wilhelm Mayer (General) (1886–1950), German General in the Luftwaffe
- Wilhelm Mayer (politician, born 1874) (1874–1923), German politician (Center, BVP)
- Wilhelm Mayer (composer) (1831–1898)
- Wilhelm Mayer (fighter pilot) (1917–1945), German World War II Luftwaffe ace
- Wilhelm Mayer-Gross (1889–1961), German-British psychiatrist and professor
