= Michael Meyer =

Michael Meyer may refer to:

- Michael Meyer (translator) (1921–2000), English translator
- Michael Meyer (travel writer), American travel writer
- Michael R. Meyer, journalist and speechwriter
- Michael Meyer (swimmer) (born 1992), South African swimmer
- Michael A. Meyer (born 1937), German-born American historian of modern Jewish history
- Michael Meyer von Bremen (born 1957), American politician
- Mike Meyer (American football) (born 1992), American football placekicker
- Mike Disfarmer (1884–1959), American photographer (born Mike Meyer)

== See also ==
- Michel Meyer (born 1936), French canoer
- Mike Meyers (disambiguation)
- Michael Mayer (disambiguation)
- Michael Myers (disambiguation)
