= Christopher J. Mayer =

American economist

- Education: University of Rochester; M.I.T.
- Occupations: Professor of economics and finance
- Employer: Columbia Business School
- Title: Paul Milstein Professor of Real Estate

Christopher J. Mayer (born c. 1965) is an American economist. He is the Paul Milstein Professor of real estate at Columbia Business School, where he is also the research director of the Paul Milstein Center for Real Estate. He has also been a visiting scholar at the Federal Reserve Bank of New York, and research associate at the National Bureau of Economic Research.

== Education and other work ==
Mayer received a BA in math and economics from the University of Rochester in 1987 and a PhD in economics from MIT in 1993.

Mayer serves on the board of editors of Real Estate Economics and the Journal of Urban Economics and is a Fellow of the Homer Hoyt Institute. He also works as part-time research director and member of the board of directors of Oak Hill REIT Management, a REIT hedge fund. Mayer previously held positions at the Wharton School, the University of Michigan, and the Federal Reserve Bank of Boston.

== Home mortgage interest rate proposal ==
In October 2008, Mayer introduced a proposal with colleague Glenn Hubbard to ameliorate the effects of the 2008 financial crisis by offering home owners the opportunity to refinance their home mortgage at an interest rate of 5.25%. (By December, they had adjusted the proposed rate down to 4.5%.) Mayer and Hubbard argued that the opportunity to refinance household debt at a low rate would improve both household and financial institution balance sheets which would then result in increased investment and consumer spending, mitigating the extent of the 2008 financial crisis. The proposal was subsequently debated in The Wall Street Journal, The New York Times, NPR, and Bloomberg News. On December 12, 2008, Bloomberg News reported that President-Elect Barack Obama's economic team had expressed interest in the plan and White House economic chief Lawrence Summers had attempted to flesh out the details of the plan with Mayer and Hubbard.
