= Richard Mayer =

Richard Mayer may refer to:

- Richard Mayer (rower) (1892–?), Austrian Olympic rower
- Richard E. Mayer (born 1947), American educational psychologist
- Richard J. Mayer (born 1952), American engineer
- Dick Mayer (1924–1989), American golfer

== See also ==
- Richard Meyer (disambiguation)
