= James Meyer (cricketer) =

English cricketer

Personal information
- Full name: James Duncan Meyer
- Born: 7 March 1966 (age 60); Wolverhampton, Staffordshire, England
- Batting: Right-handed
- Bowling: Right-arm medium

Domestic team information
- Years: Team
- 2000: Worcestershire Cricket Board
- 1995: Shropshire

Career statistics
Competition	LA
Matches	1
Runs scored	7
Batting average	7.00
100s/50s	–/–
Top score	7
Balls bowled	60
Wickets	1
Bowling average	42.00
5 wickets in innings	–
10 wickets in match	–
Best bowling	1/42
Catches/stumpings	–/–
- Source: Cricinfo, 2 November 2010

James Duncan Meyer (born 7 March 1966) is a former English cricketer. Meyer was a right-handed batsman who bowled right-arm medium pace. He was born at Wolverhampton, Staffordshire.

Meyer played a single MCCA Knockout Trophy match for Shropshire against Dorset in 1995.

In 2000, he represented the Worcestershire Cricket Board in a single List A match against the Kent Cricket Board in the 2000 NatWest Trophy. In his only List A match, he scored 7 runs and took a single wicket at a cost of 42 runs.
