= Joseph Friedrich Bernhard Caspar Majer =

German musician

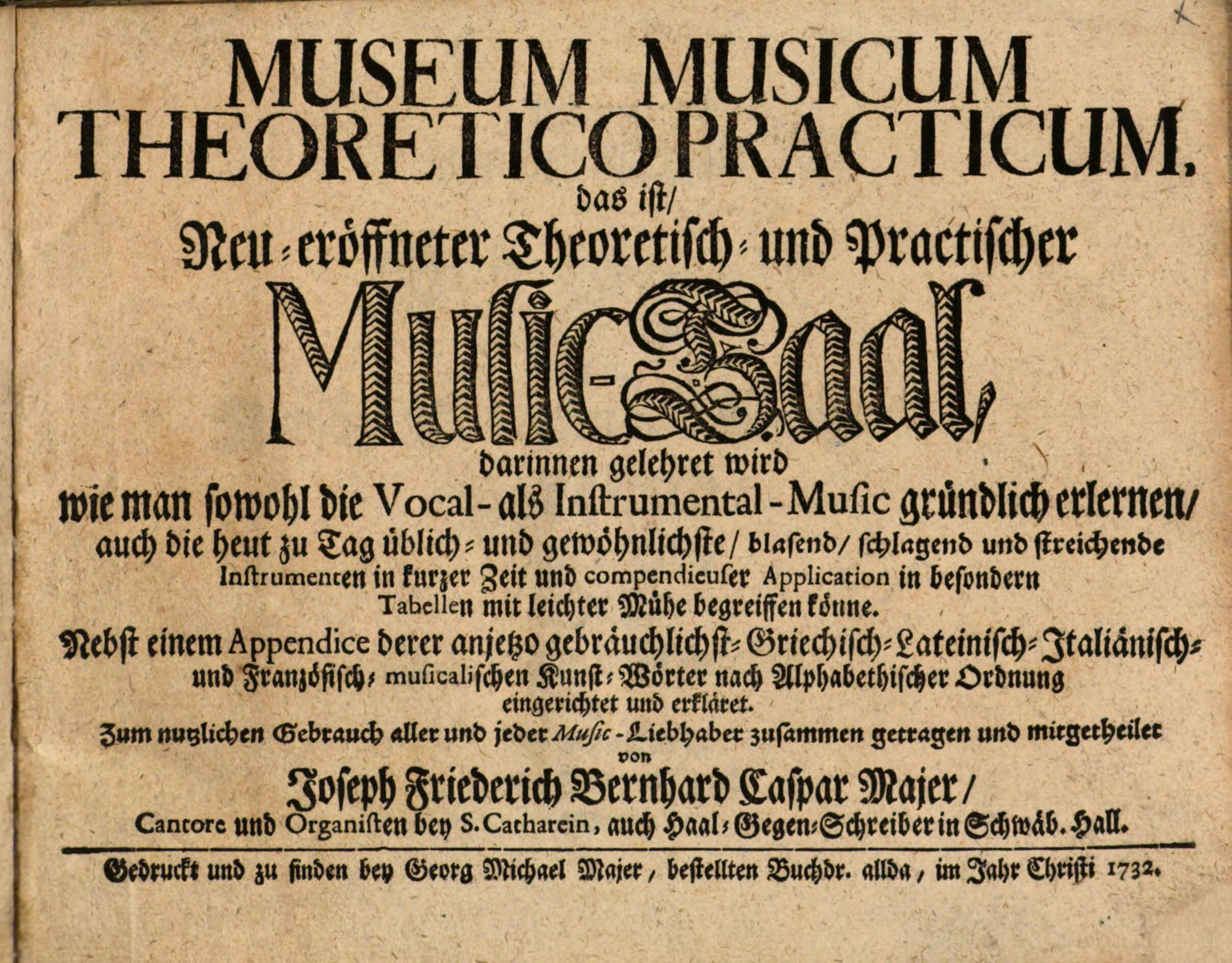
Museum Musicum Theoretico-Practicum, by Joseph Friedrich Bernhard Caspar Majer. Title page.

Joseph Friedrich Bernhard Caspar Majer (16 October 1689, Schwäbisch Hall – 22 May 1768, Schwäbisch Hall), was a German musician from the beginning of the 18th century, a "significant writer" on music in the late Baroque era.

He was a singer at Schwäbisch Hall, an organist and cantor at St. Katharina, and author of two books, music methods:

- 1718, Hodegus musicus. Teaches singing. A later edition published Schwäbisch Hall by Georg M. Majer, 1741.
- 1732, Museum musicum theoretico-practicum. The author advertised on the title page that readers would learn how to thoroughly learn both vocal and instrumental music) (1732). A second edition came out in 1741.

His second book was written to acquaint would-be musicians with information to help them learn to play instruments. The instruments included: recorder, chalumeau, transverse flute, 3-keyed bassoon, cornett, flageolet, and 2-keyed clarinet, clarion trumpet, tenor and bass trombone, alto and quint trombone, horn, lute, "harp" or psaltery, guitar, timpani, violin, viola, cello, viola de gamba and viola d'amore. The book also includes the basics for reading music, a "survey of vocal music and intervals," and a dictionary of musical terms.

What made him to be considered a significant writer was the annotations that he made in his personal copy of Museum musicum theoreticalo-practicum. That city reside in the Württembergische Landesbibliothek, Stuttgart.

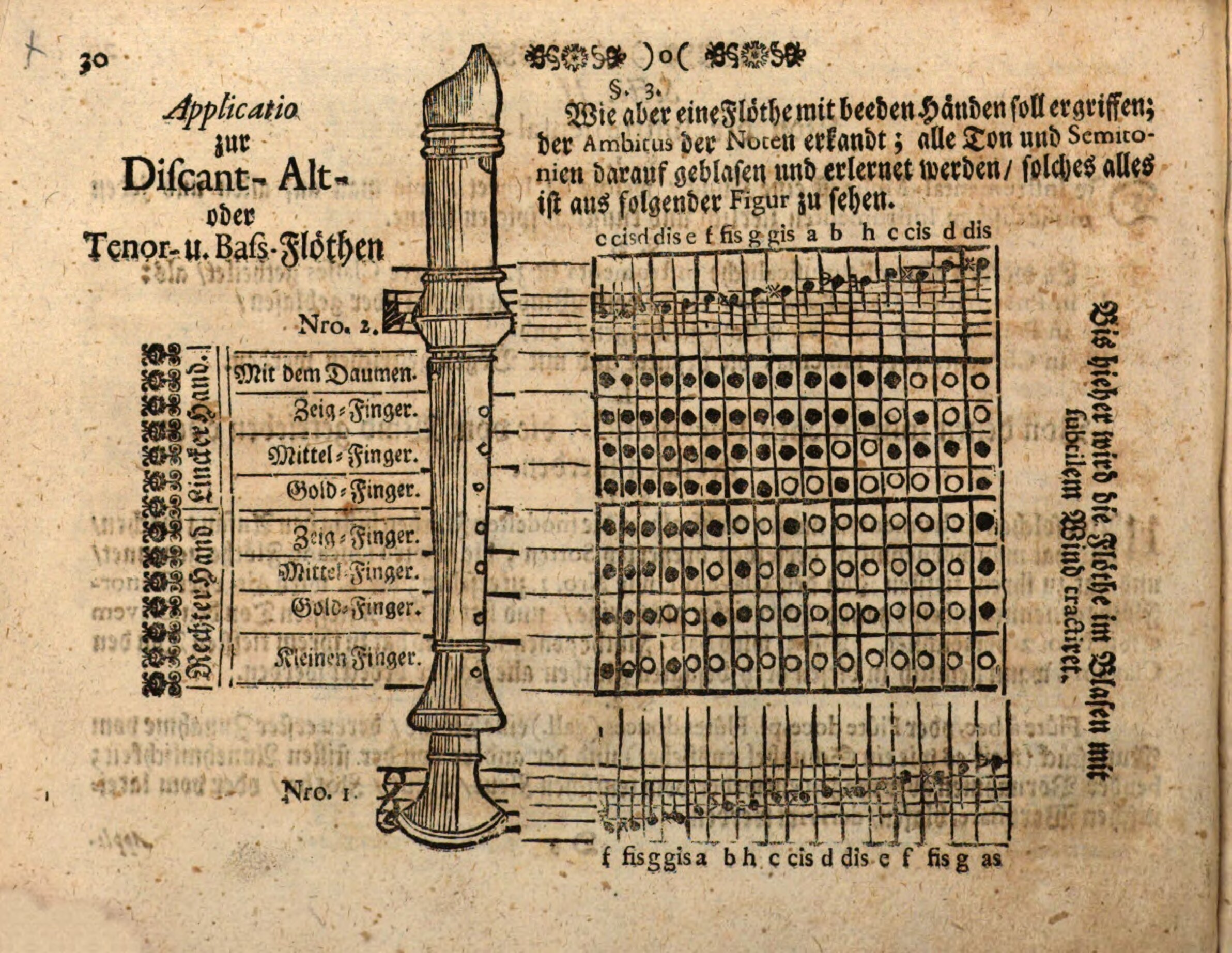
Tenor Bass Recorder

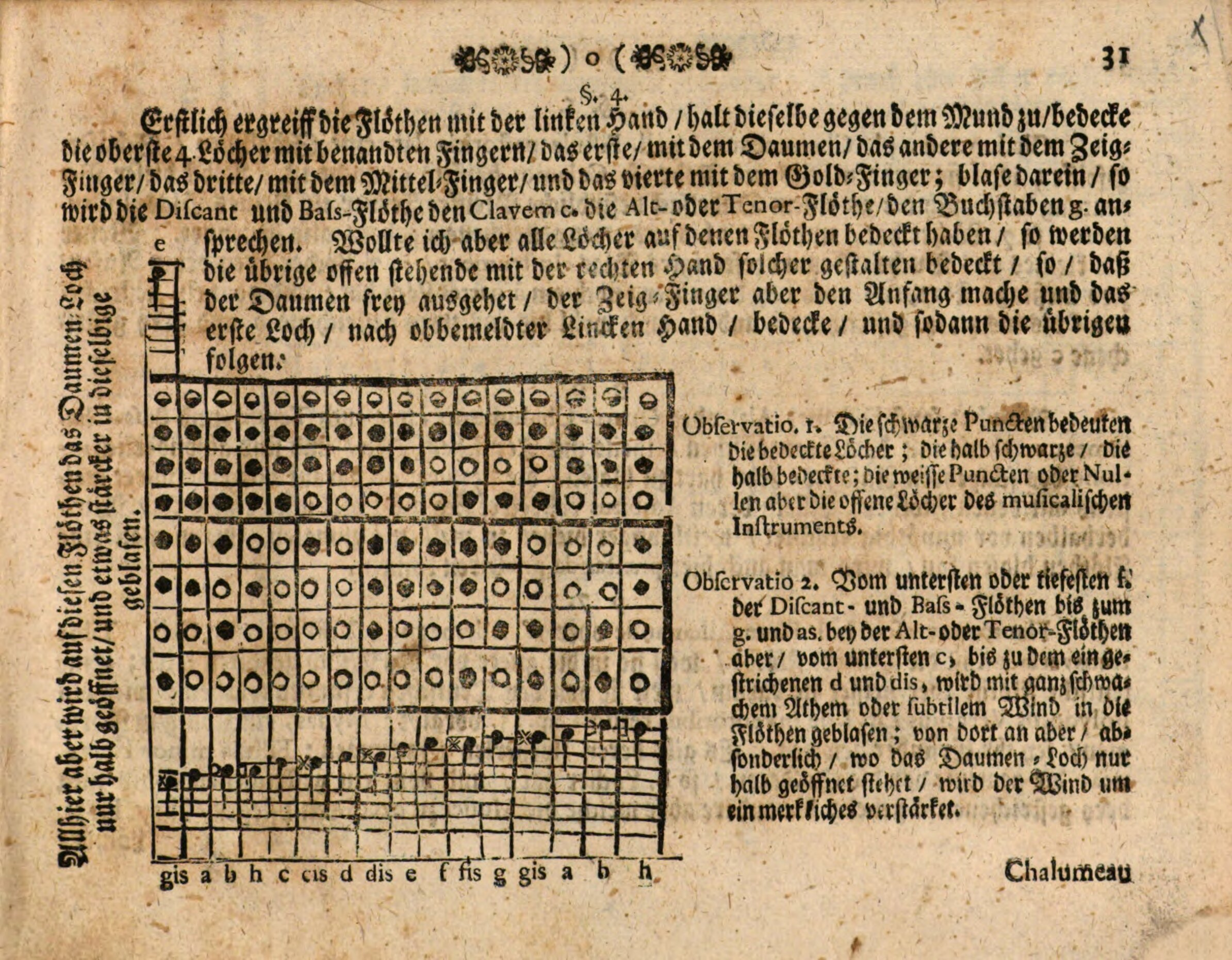
Chalumeau

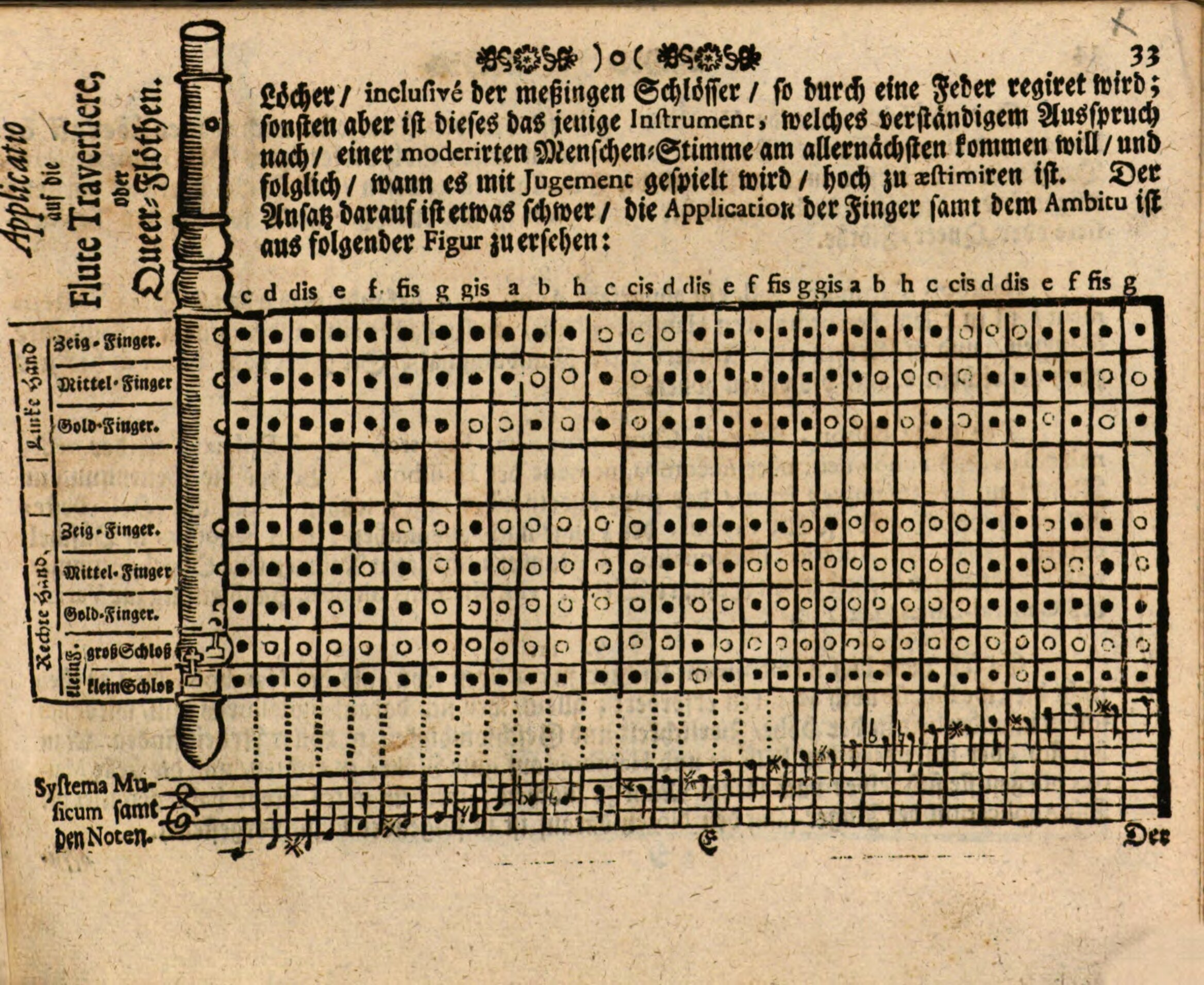
Transverse flute

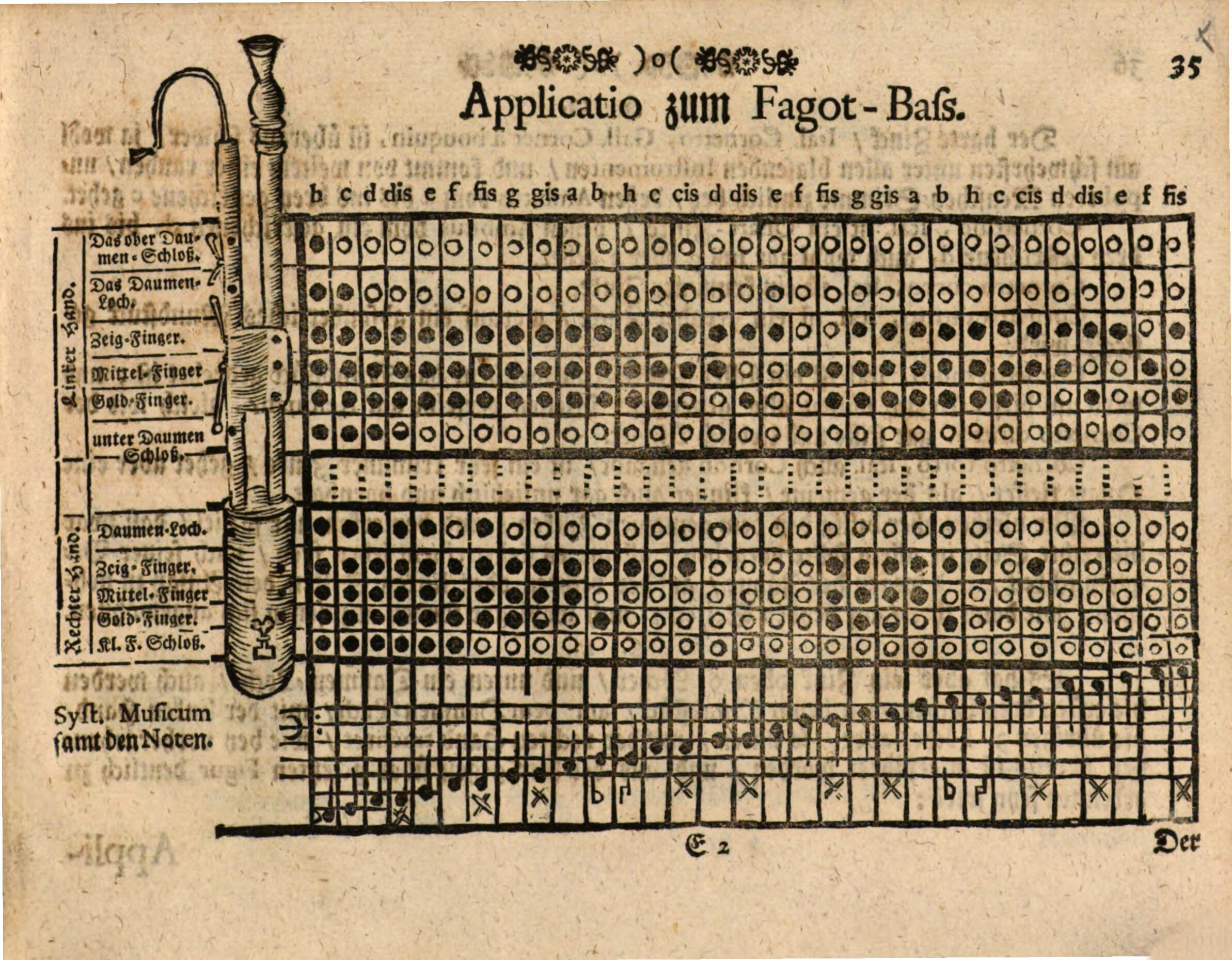
Bassoon

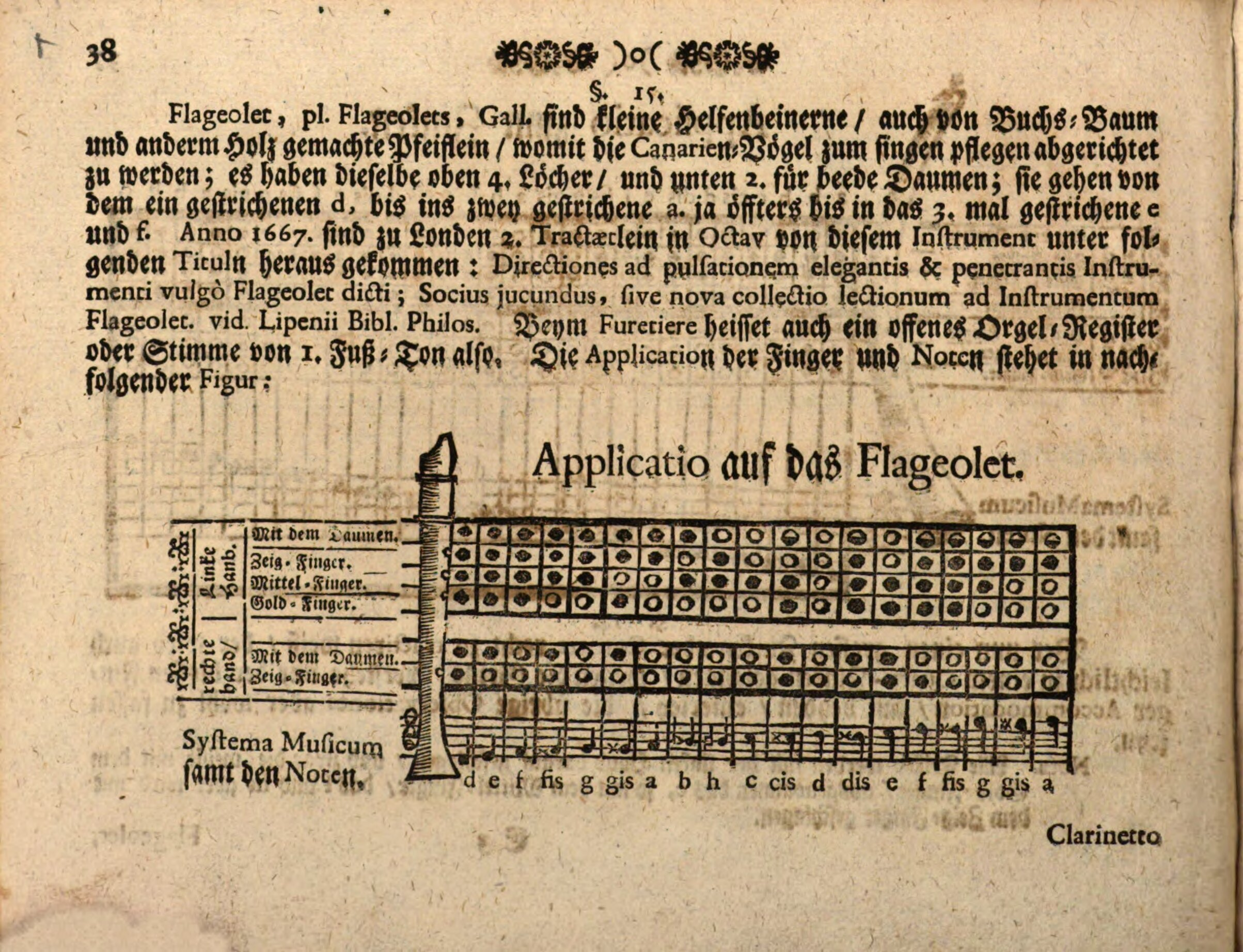
Flageolet

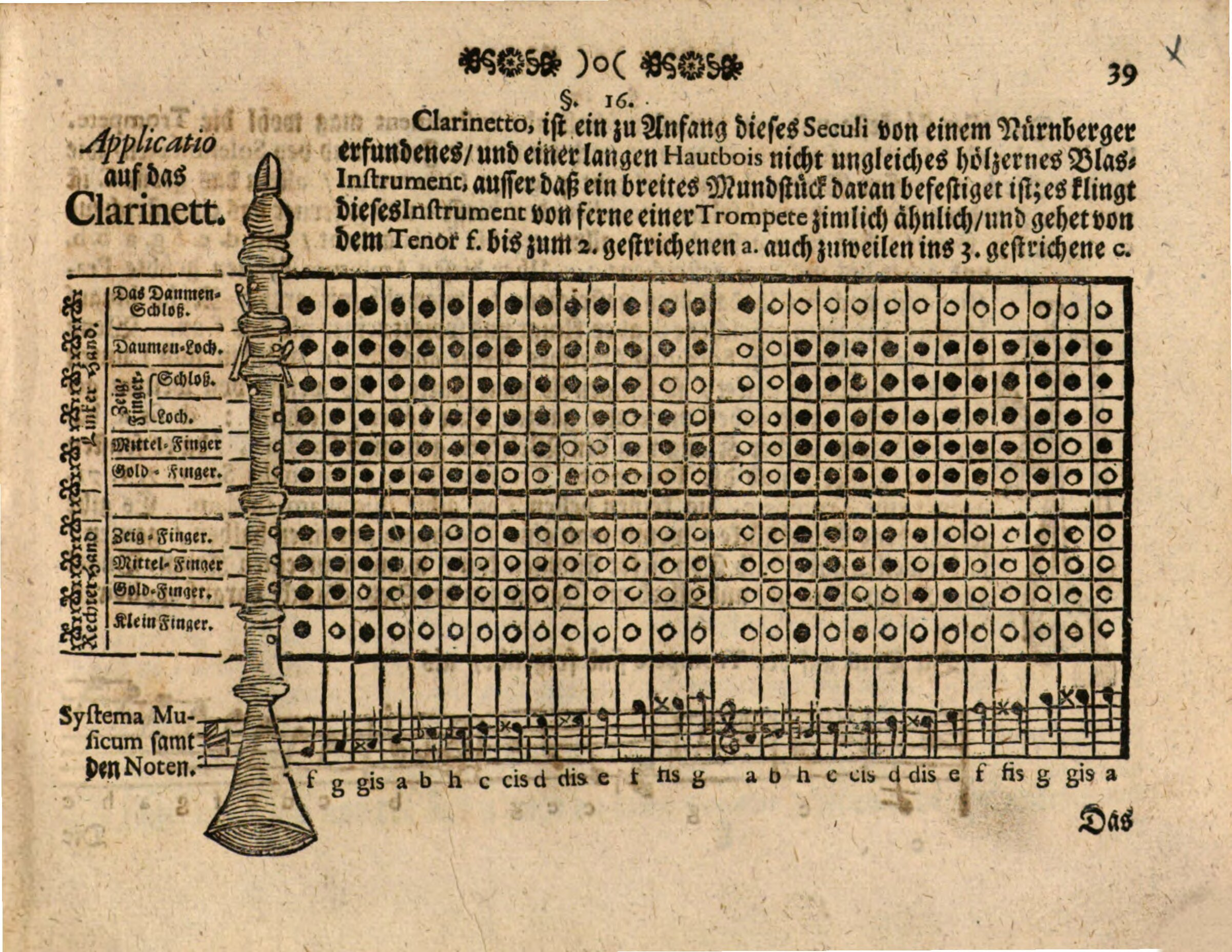
Two-key clarinet

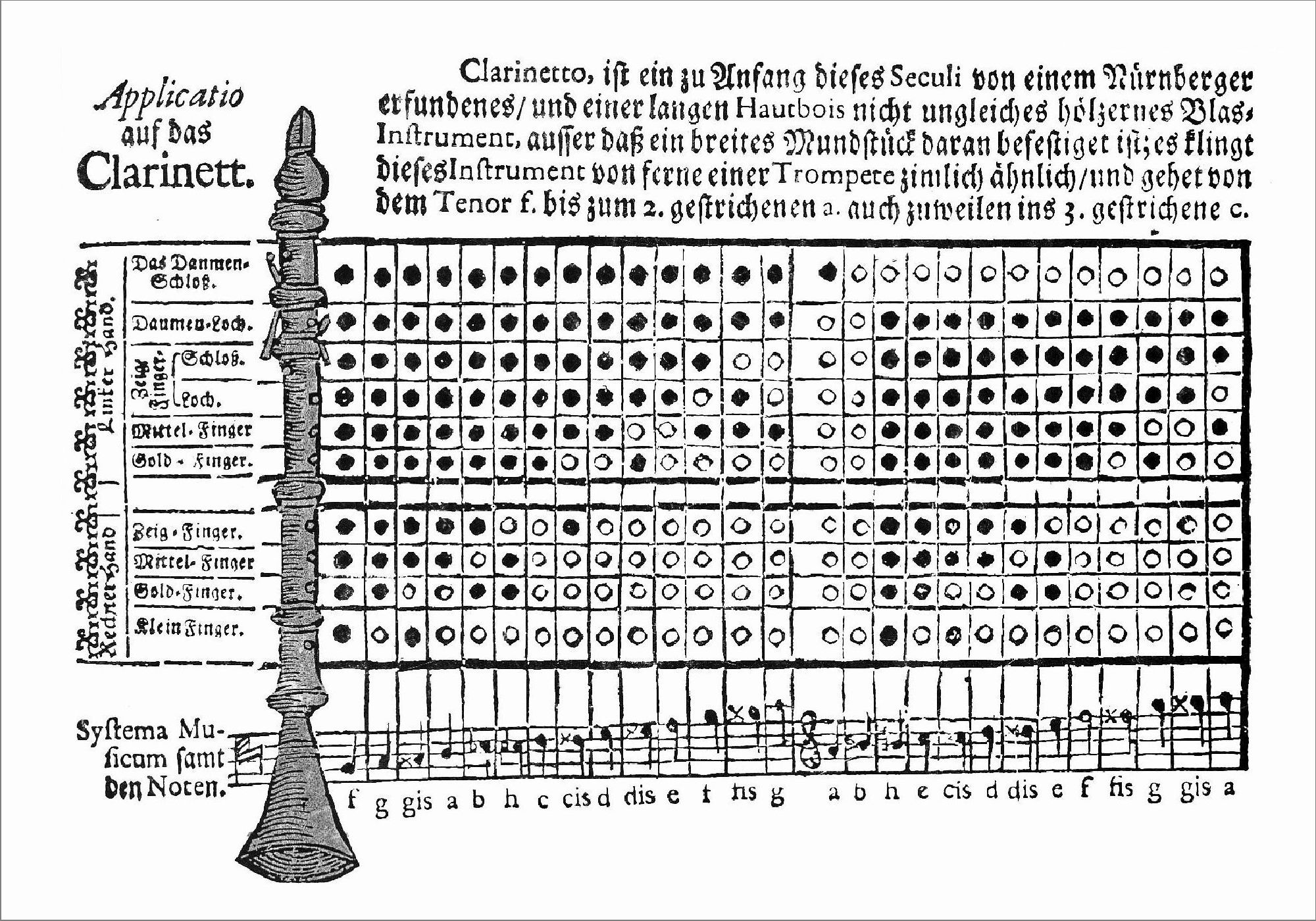
Two-key clarinet (1)

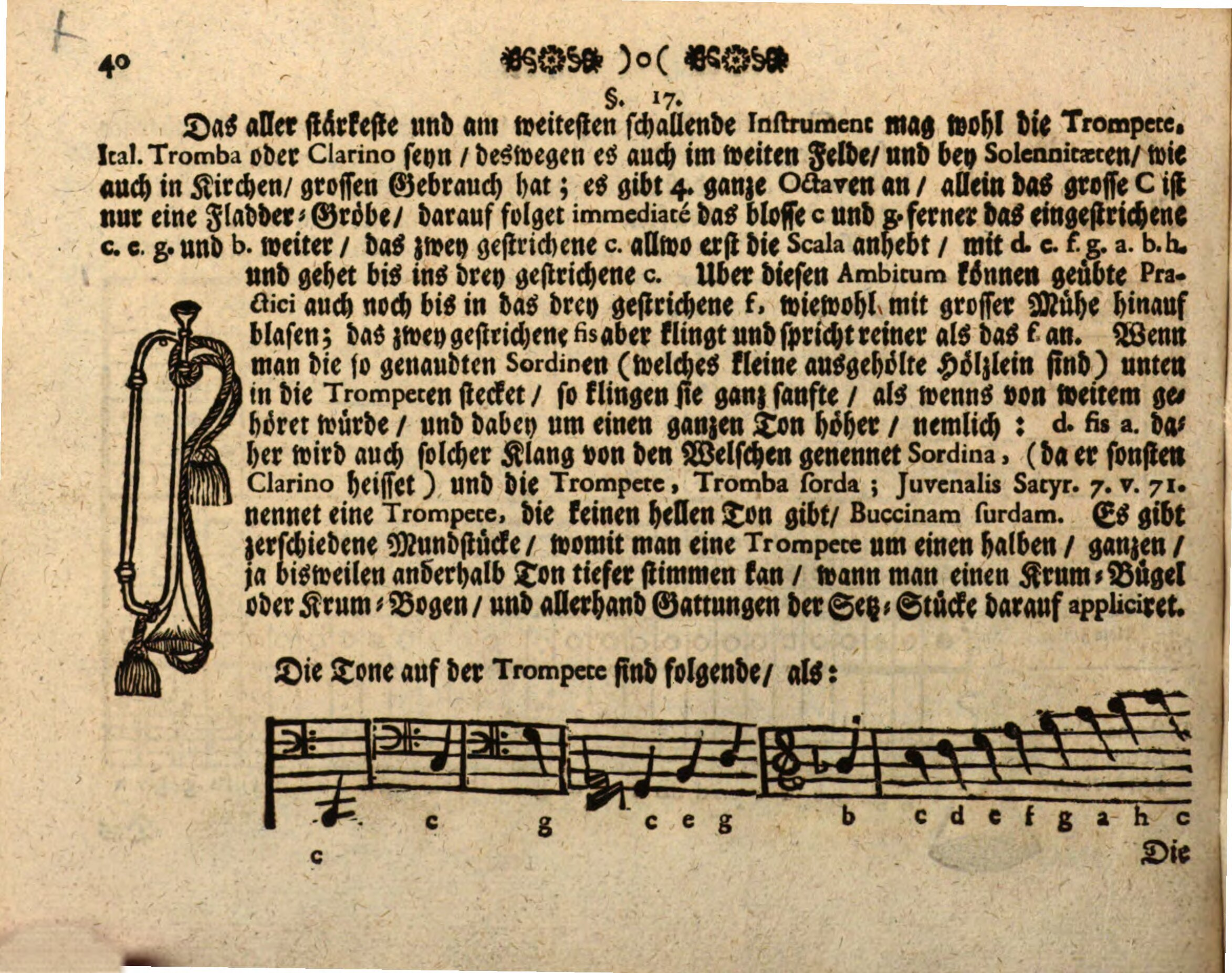
Clarion

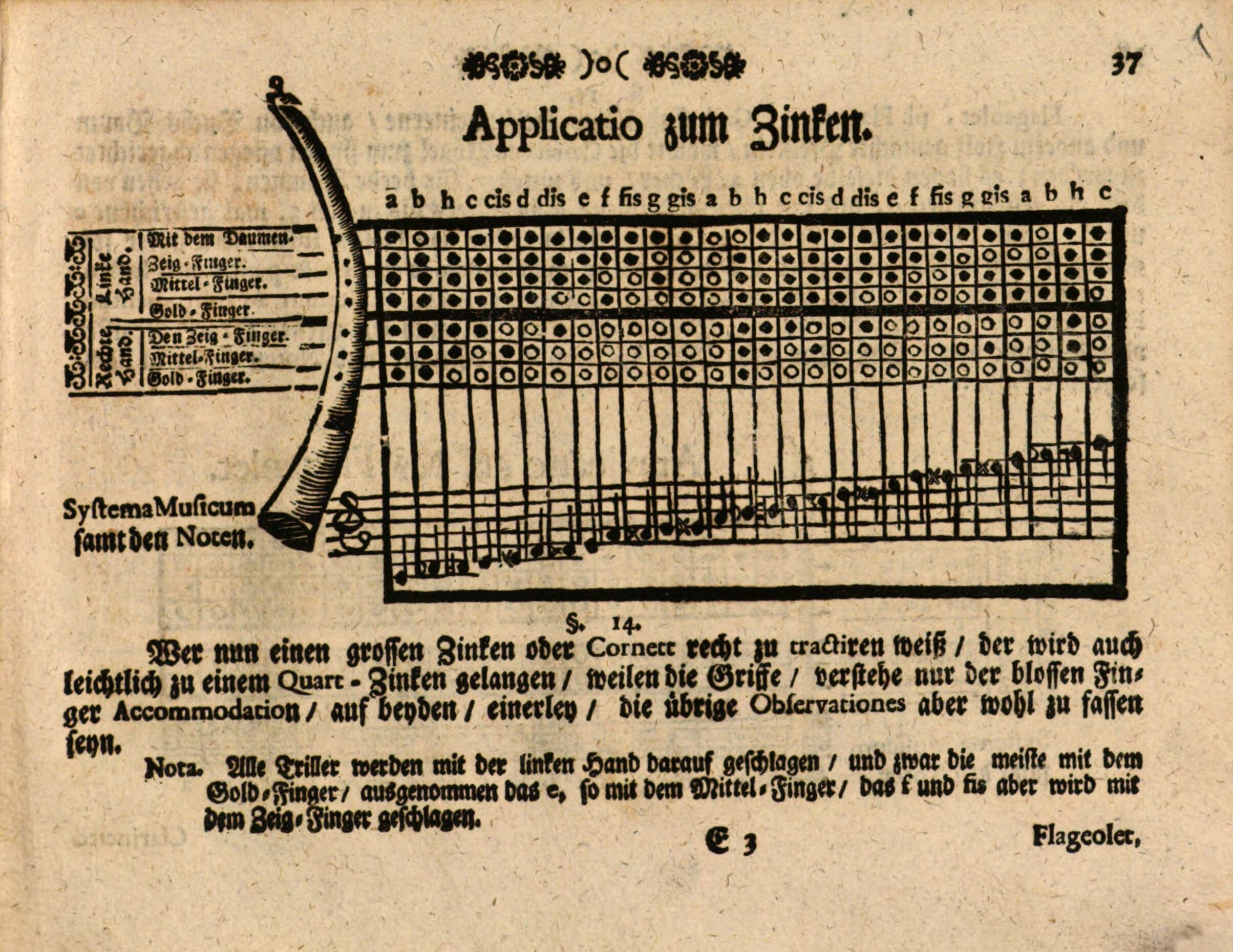
Fingering chart, cornett

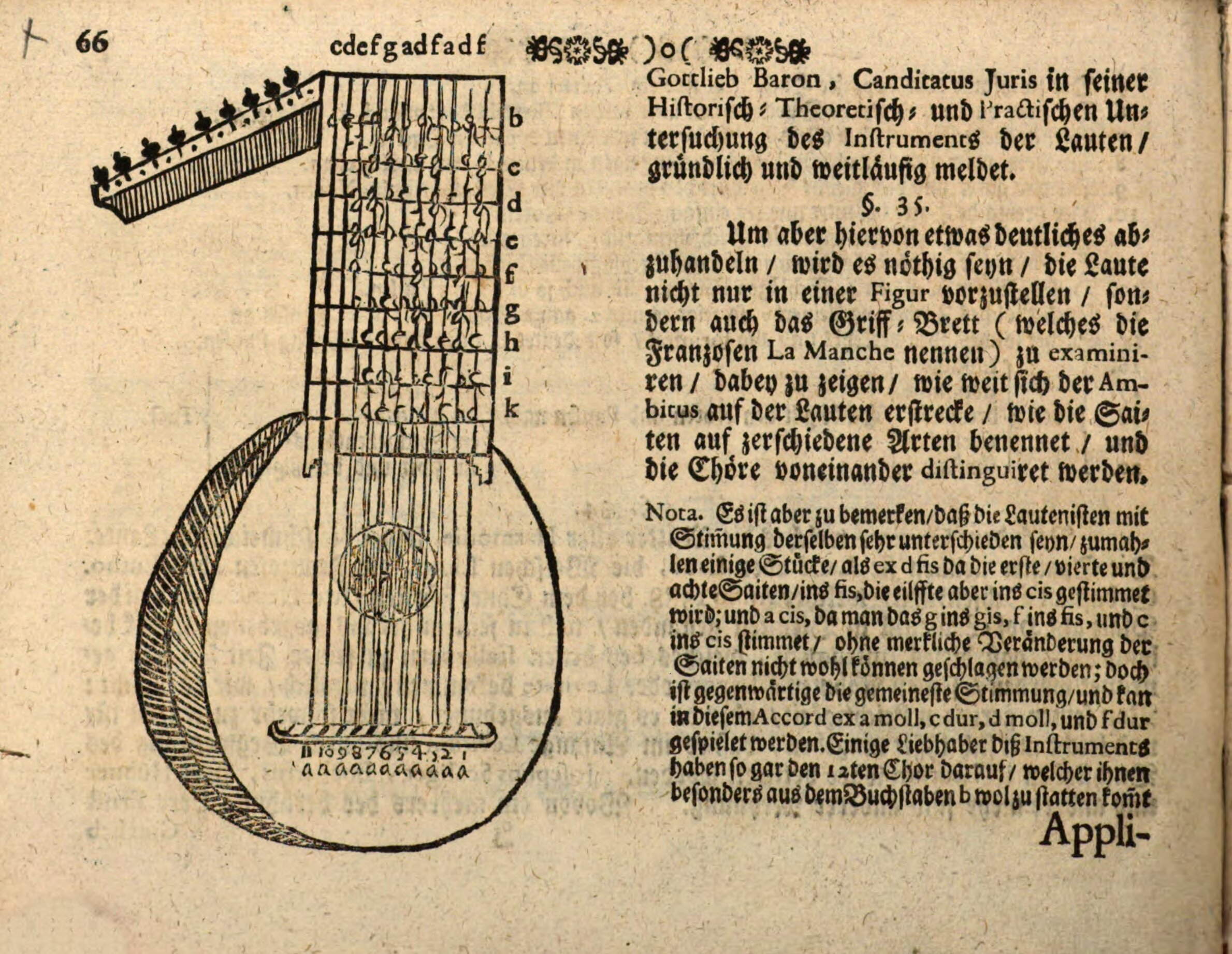
Tuning the lute, fretboard

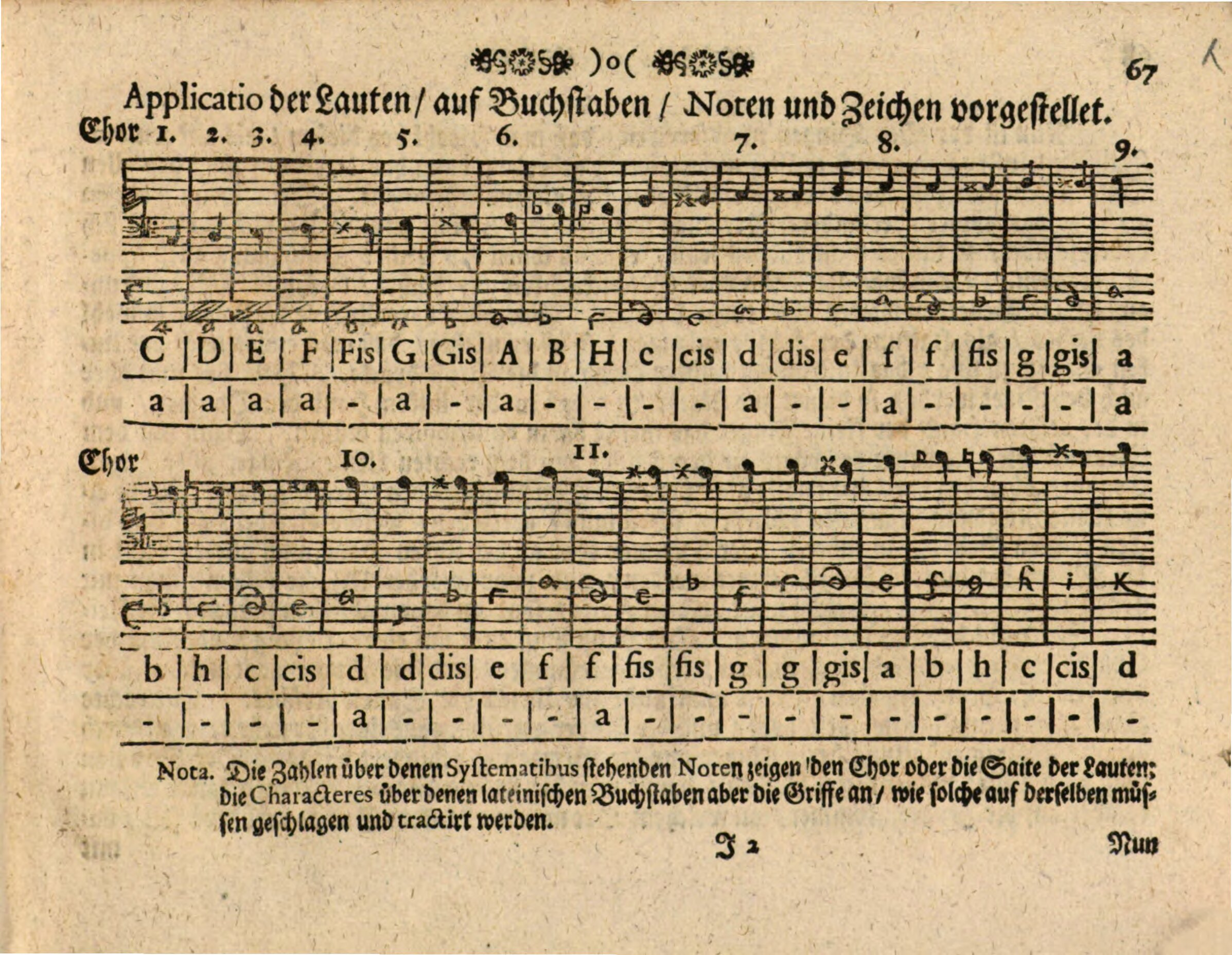
Lute, strings, their notes placed

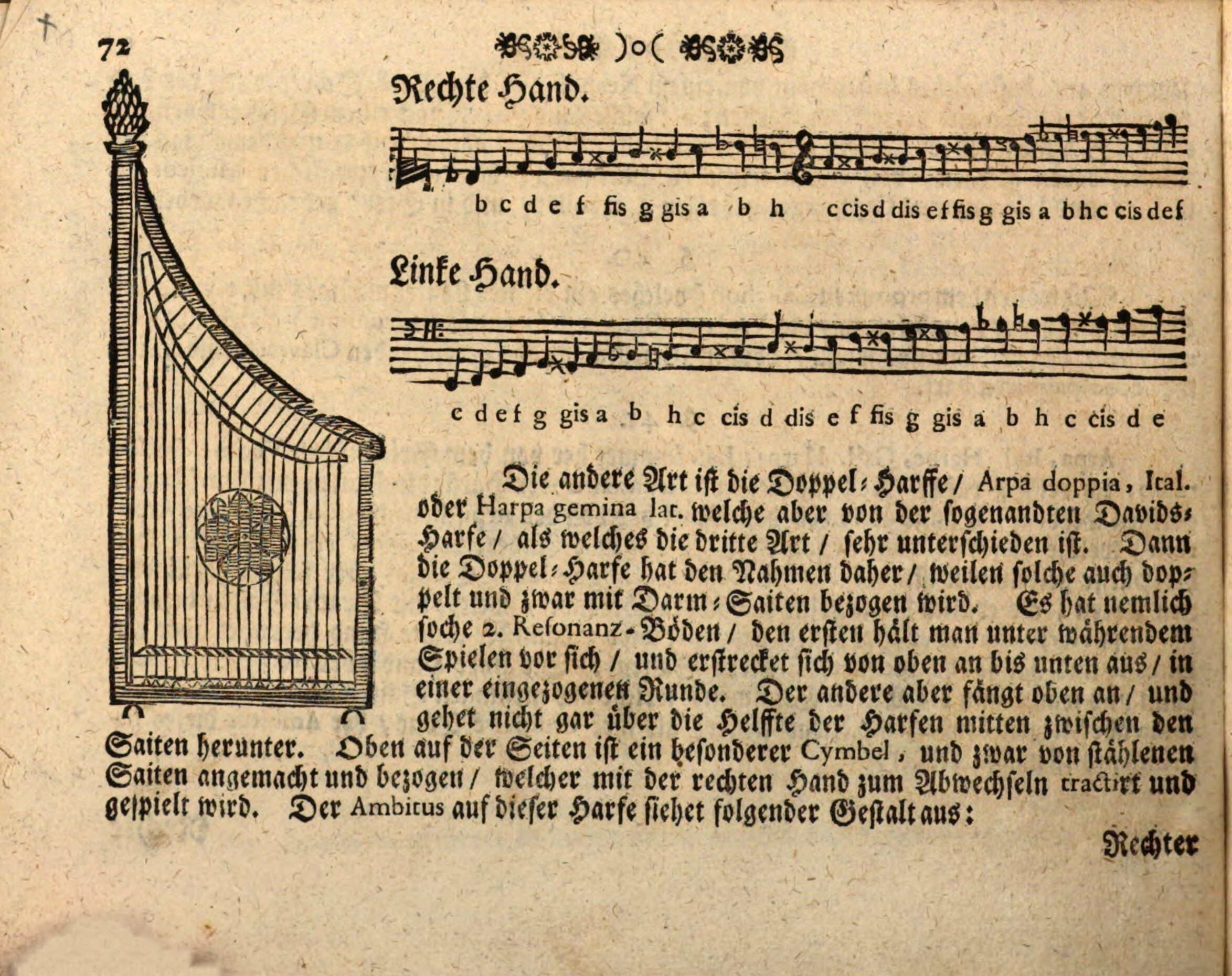
Psaltery
