= Alfred Mayer =

Alfred Mayer may refer to:

- Alfred G. Mayer (1868–1922), marine biologist and zoologist
- Alfred M. Mayer (1836–1897), physicist
- Alfred Mayer (politician) (1936–2022), Austrian politician
- Jones v. Alfred H. Mayer Co., a landmark United States Supreme Court case
- Alf Mayer (sport shooter) (1938–2021), Canadian Olympic shooter
