= Michael Mayer =

Michael Mayer may refer to:

- Michael Mayer (American football) (born 2001), American football tight end
- Michael Mayer (director) (born 1960), American theatrical and film director
- Michael Mayer (footballer) (born 1970), German football midfielder
- Michael Mayer (musician) (born 1971), German electronic musician
- Michael Mayer (volleyball) (born 1980), German volleyball player
- Mike Mayer, American actor, screenwriter, and director

== See also ==
- Mike Mayers (born 1991), American professional baseball player
- Mike-Mayer (surname)
- Michael Meyer (disambiguation)
- Mike Meyers (disambiguation)
- Michael Myers (disambiguation)
