= Charles Mayer =

Charles Mayer may refer to:

- Charles Mayer (actor) (born 1970), English stage actor
- Charles Mayer (boxer) (1882–1972), American boxer
- Charles Mayer (composer) (1799–1862), or Meyer, Prussian composer
- Charles Mayer (animal collector) (1862–1927), American animal collector and plagiarist
- Charles Mayer (journalist) (1901–1971), Canadian journalist, sportsperson and politician
- Charles Mayer (politician) (1936–2025), Canadian businessman and politician
- Charles F. Mayer (1795–1864), American lawyer, Maryland state senator, and railroad director
- Charles F. Mayer (railroad president) (1826–1904), Maryland businessman and B&O president, nephew of the above
- Charles Léopold Mayer (1881–1971), French biochemist and philosopher

== See also ==
- Charles Maier (disambiguation)
- Charles Meyer (disambiguation)
