= Roland Mayer (classicist) =

Classical scholar (born 1947)

Roland Mayer (born 1947) is emeritus professor of classics at King's College London. He is a specialist in Latin literature and Roman culture.

Mayer read for a BA at UC Berkeley, as well as a BA, MA and PhD at Cambridge.

He became a classics lecturer at Birkbeck in 1978 and moved to King's in 1989.

== Selected publications ==
- Mayer, Roland (2002). Seneca : Phaedra. London: Duckworth. ISBN 0-7156-3165-9. OCLC 54041487.
