= Daniel Mayer (impresario) =

English musician and politician

Daniel Mayer (1856 – 1928) was a German-born English musical entrepreneur. He was three times mayor of Bexhill-on-Sea.

== History ==
Mayer was born in Westphalia, to Gottschalk Mayer and Henrietta Heyman Mayer. They brought him to England at the age of two but sent him back to Germany to study in Coblenz, Cologne and Bonn. He returned to England in 1874.

Mayer married Alice Allez, a British subject, in 1886, and was himself naturalized in 1892, at which time the family was living at 6 Maresfield Gardens, Belsize Park, London. They moved to Bexhill around 1895, from around 1905 living at Collington Manor. He was elected councillor for the town, and mayor in 1905 and again from 1911 to 1914, when he stood down, at least in part due to his German heritage, which was suspect despite their two sons enlisting with the British Army (Emil died from pneumonia in 1918 and possibly never left Britain). Mayer's mayoral portrait was removed from the town hall in 1915.

He was a prominent concert director and musical entrepreneur in the late 19th- and early 20th-centuries, an agent for, amongst others, Anna Pavlova. He has also been described as a piano manufacturer. In 1896 he was granted a US patent for a resonator for pianos and other stringed instruments.

He was concert agent for Nellie Melba and the flautist John Lemmone, and Ada Crossley, also Frieda Simonson, an eight-year-old piano prodigy,

He arranged tours of Australia for

- Paderewski in July 1892.
- Ysaÿe (violin), Gerardy (cello), one Schonberger (piano), Amy Sherwin and Girtin Barnard (vocalists) in November 1891 Postponed to 1895, this tour did not eventuate.

In 1919 he shifted his operational base to New York and shortly after, visited Australia with Mischa Levitski, both adding some support to the establishment of a Sydney Symphony Orchestra, to which end Melba had contributed £200. The "man in the street" was not forthcoming however.

== Personal ==
Mayer married Alice Allez (1862 – 17 November 1912) of Colebrooke, Guernsey, in 1886. They had three children

- Millicent Margaret Mayer (born Guernsey c. 1877)
- Emil Nicolas (Emile Daniel?) Mayer (born Eccles c. 1883)
- Rudolph Max Mayer (born Hollington c. 1885)

It is possible he was Jewish by birth, but not religious. In England he was associated with Christian Science and Freemasonry.
