= Christian Mayer =

Christian Mayer may refer to:

- Christian Mayer (astronomer) (1719–1783), Czech astronomer and teacher
- Christian Mayer (skier) (born 1972), Austrian former alpine skier
- Christian Mayer (Wisconsin politician) (1827–1910), Wisconsin manufacturer, mayor and legislator
- Christian Gustav Adolph Mayer (1839–1907), German mathematician
- Christian Ludwig Mayer (born 1974), German pianist and composer

== See also ==
- C. Mayer (crater), named for the astronomer
- Christian Meyer (disambiguation)
- Christian Meier (disambiguation)
