= Major (surname) =

Major is a surname. Notable people with the surname include:

- Alan Major (born 1968), American basketball coach
- Alice Major (born 1949), Scottish-born Canadian poet, writer, and essayist
- Allyson Major Jr (died 2019), Belizean shooting victim
- André Major (born 1942), Canadian writer
- Andrew Major (1921–2004), Hungarian-born American businessman
- Annie Major (1904–1981), British politician
- Anya Major (born 1966), English athlete, actress, model and singer
- Balázs Major (born 1990), Hungarian ice dancer
- Brenda Major (born 1950), American psychologist
- Bruce Major (born 1967), Canadian-born American businessman and ice hockey player
- Bruno Major (born 1988), British singer-songwriter and guitarist
- Catherine Major (born 1980), Canadian singer and songwriter
- Charles Major (writer) (1856–1913), American lawyer and novelist
- Charles Beautron Major (1875–1966), Canadian lawyer, judge and politician
- Charles E. Major (1859–1954), New Zealand politician of the Liberal Party
- Charles Henry Major (1860–1933), British judge
- Charles Immanuel Forsyth Major (1843–1923), Scottish-born Swiss physician, zoologist and palaeontologist
- Charles W. Major (1904–1984), Bahamian high jumper
- Charlie Major (born 1954), Canadian country music singer
- Christine Major (born 1966), Canadian painter
- Clare Tree Major (1880–1954), British stage director, playwright, producer of children's theater, and actress
- Clarence Major (born 1936), American poet
- Dan T. Major (born 1973), Israeli chemistry professor
- David Major (1866–1936), American psychologist and author
- Devorah Major (born 1952), American writer
- Douglas Major (born 1953), American composer and organist
- Drew Major (born 1956), American computer scientist and entrepreneur
- Earl Major (1887–1972), American lawyer, jurist, and politician
- Edith Major (1867–1951), Irish educationalist
- Edward Major (1615–ca. 1655), Virginia colonial politician
- Elliott Woolfolk Major (1864–1949), American lawyer and politician
- Endre Major (born 1969), Hungarian para table tennis player
- Fali Homi Major (born 1947), Indian air marshal
- George Major (speedway rider) (born 1939), British former motorcycle speedway rider
- George Major (cricketer) (1851–1921), Australian cricketer
- George D. Major (1819–1902), American politician, businessman and agriculturist
- Gerri Major (1894–1984), African-American journalist and community leader
- Grant Major (born 1955), New Zealand art director
- Greg Major (born 1938), Australian rules footballer
- Henry Major (1871–1961), New Zealand Anglican clergyman and theologian
- István Major (1949–2014), Hungarian high jumper
- James Earl Major (1887–1972), US federal judge
- James Patrick Major (1836–1877), American Civil War Confederate brigadier general
- János Major (1934–2008), Hungarian graphic artist, painter and photographer
- Jean Major (born 1957), Canadian field hockey player
- Jenő Major (1891–1972), Hungarian military officer
- Johann Major (1533–1600), German Protestant theologian, humanist and poet
- John Major (philosopher) (1467–1550), Scottish philosopher and historian
- John Major (17th-century English MP) (died 1628), English politician and Member of Parliament
- Sir John Major, 1st Baronet (1698–1781), English merchant and Member of Parliament
- John Major (publisher) (1782–1849), English publisher and bookseller
- John Richardson Major (1797–1876), English clergyman and schoolmaster
- John Major (cricketer) (1861–1930), English cricketer
- Ken Major (1928–2009, John Kenneth Major), English architect, author and world authority on industrial archaeology
- John C. Major (born 1931), former Justice of the Supreme Court of Canada
- John Major (rugby union) (born 1940), New Zealand rugby union player
- Joshua Major (1786–1866), English landscape gardener and designer
- Kathleen Major (1906–2000), British historian
- Ken Major (1928–2009), British architect, author and industrial archaeologist
- Kevin Major (born 1949), Canadian writer
- Lenia Major (born 1971), French writer
- Léo Major (1921–2008), Canadian Army corporal
- Leon Major (born 1933), Canadian opera and theatre director
- Leroy Major, Bahamian politician
- Les Major (1926–2001), English footballer
- Lionel Major (1883–1965), English cricketer
- Malvina Major (born 1943), New Zealand opera singer
- Marcus Major, American novelist
- Mark Major (born 1970), Canadian ice hockey player
- Miro Major (born 1980), Croatian New Zealand footballer and futsal player
- Norma Major (born 1942), English philanthropist, wife of John Major
- Norman Major (1934–2025), American politician
- Patrick Major (born 1964), British historian
- Richard Henry Major (1818–1891), British geographer and map librarian
- Rip Major (1889–1934), American football player, sports coach and administrator
- Robert Major (1915–1997), Canadian administrator and politician
- S. I. M. Major (1830–1886), American politician
- Samuel C. Major (1869–1931), American politician
- Sándor Major (born 1965), Hungarian wrestler
- Sandra Major (born 1954), American politician
- Scott Major (born 1975), Australian actor and director
- Tamás Major (1910–1986), Hungarian stage and film actor
- Tania Major (born 1981), Australian Aboriginal activist
- Thomas Major (1720–1799), English engraver
- Veronika Major (born 1997), Hungarian sports shooter
- William James Major (1881–1953), Canadian politician
- William Major (Ontario politician) (1896–1966), Canadian politician
- William T. Major (1790–1867), American religious leader in Bloomington, Illinois

== See also ==
- Major (disambiguation), which includes fictional characters
- Major (given name)
- Majors (surname)
