= John Maher =

John Maher may refer to:

- John A. Maher, American politician
- John C. Maher (born 1951), Irish-British linguist
- John Maher (Buzzcocks drummer) (born 1960), British car specialist and former drummer of The Buzzcocks
- John Maher (Delancey Street) (1940–1988), founder of the Delancey Street Foundation
- John Maher (Gaelic footballer), for Galway
- John Maher (Kilkenny hurler) (born 1977), Irish hurler
- John Maher (Tipperary hurler) (1908–1980), Irish hurler
- John W. Maher (1866–1917), American politician and veterinarian
- Johnny Marr (born 1963), English guitarist, born John Martin Maher

== See also ==
- John Marre, American soccer player
- John Mair (disambiguation)
- John Mayer (disambiguation)
- John Mayor (disambiguation)
- John Meier (disambiguation)
- John Meyer (disambiguation)
