= John Mayor =

John Mayor may refer to:

- John Mayor (brewer) (1735–1817), English brewer, Member of Parliament for Abingdon, and civil servant
- John Eyton Bickersteth Mayor (1825–1910), English classical scholar
- John Major (philosopher) (1467–1550), also spelled John Mayor, Scottish philosopher

== See also ==
- John Major (disambiguation)
- John Maher (disambiguation)
- John Mair (disambiguation)
- John Mayer (disambiguation)
- John Meier (disambiguation)
- John Meyer (disambiguation)
