= John Major (disambiguation) =

John Major (born 1943) was the Prime Minister of the United Kingdom from 1990 to 1997.

John Major is also the name of:

- John Major (philosopher) (1467–1550), Scottish philosopher and historian
- John Major (17th-century English MP) (died 1628), English politician and Member of Parliament
- Sir John Major, 1st Baronet (1698–1781), English merchant and Member of Parliament
- John Major (publisher) (1782–1849), English publisher and bookseller
- John Richardson Major (1797–1876), English clergyman and schoolmaster
- John Major (cricketer) (1861–1930), English cricketer
- Ken Major (1928–2009, John Kenneth Major), English architect, author and world authority on industrial archaeology
- John C. Major (born 1931), former Justice of the Supreme Court of Canada
- John Major (rugby union) (born 1940), New Zealand rugby union player

== See also ==
- Johnny Majors (1935–2020), American football player and coach
- John Majhor (1953–2007), Canadian radio and television host
- Jonathan Majors (born 1989), American actor
- John Mair (disambiguation)
- John Mayer (disambiguation)
- John Meier (disambiguation)
