= George Major =

George Major may refer to:

- George Major (speedway rider) (born 1939), British former motorcycle speedway rider
- George Major (cricketer) (1851–1921), Australian cricketer
- George D. Major (1819–1902), American politician, businessman and agriculturist

== See also ==
- Georg Major (1502–1574), Lutheran theologian
- George Maior (born 1967), Romanian politician and diplomat
