= Major =

Major(s) or The Major may refer to:

== Common meanings ==
- Major (rank), a military rank
- Academic major, an academic discipline to which an undergraduate student formally commits
- Major and minor in music, an interval, chord, scale, or key
- Major suit or major in contract bridge, namely hearts and spades
- John Major (born 1943), British prime minister from 1990 to 1997

== Arts and entertainment ==
=== Fictional characters ===
- Old Major, a pig in Animal Farm
- Major Major Major Major, in Catch-22
- The Major (Hellsing)
- Major, a Majungasaurus featured in the 2024 animated series Jurassic World: Chaos Theory
- Major (Cinderella), a horse in Disney's Cinderella
- Major Gowen or the Major, in Fawlty Towers
- Motoko Kusanagi or the Major, in Ghost in the Shell
- Major Lilywhite, a character in iZombie

=== Film, television, theatre and print ===
- The Major, a 1963 BBC natural history documentary film
- The Major (film), a 2013 Russian action film
- Major (film), a 2022 Indian biopic
- Major (manga), a sports manga and anime series by Takuya Mitsuda
- The Major (play), an 1881 American musical comedy
- "The Major" (The Blacklist), a 2015 episode of The Blacklist
- Major!, a 2015 documentary about Miss Major Griffin-Gracy

=== Music ===
- Majors (band), a Danish hip-hop group
- The Majors (band), an American R&B group
- Major (American musician) (born 1984), American pop soul musician and actor
- Klaus Heuser (born 1957), German rock guitarist and producer, nicknamed "Major"
- Major, a method of change ringing for eight church bells

== People ==
- Major (given name), including people with the nickname
- Major (surname), including list of people with the surname
- Majors (surname), including list of people with the surname
- Ann Major, pen name of Margaret Major Cleaves (born 1946), American romance novelist
- Lee Major, stage name of Leigh Elliott (fl. 2008–present), American hip hop producer
- Lee Majors, stage name of American actor Harvey Lee Yeary (born 1939)
- Major (law), a person with the full legal rights of an adult

== Places ==
- Major, Saskatchewan, Canada, a village
- Lake Major, Nova Scotia, Canada, a lake and a community
- Major, Romania, the Hungarian name of Maieru, a commune in Transylvania
- Major, Kentucky, US, an unincorporated community
- Mount Major, New Hampshire, US

== Plants and animals ==
- Major (cider apple)
- Major (Dutch Elm) Ulmus × hollandica 'Major', a Dutch Elm cultivar
- Major (fly), a genus of flies
- Major (Joe Biden's dog), a German shepherd owned by Joe Biden
- Major (Franklin D. Roosevelt's dog), a German shepherd owned by Franklin D. Roosevelt

== Sports ==
- Major, or "major score," synonym for a touchdown in Canadian football
- Tennis Majors, also known as Grand Slam, the most important tournaments in the sport
- Major professional sports leagues in the United States and Canada or majors
- Golf Majors, the most prestigious championships in men's golf
- Senior major golf championships
- Women's major golf championships
- Senior women's major golf championships
- Snooker major tournaments
- Dota Major Championships, esports tournaments
- Counter-Strike Major Championships, esports tournaments

== Other uses ==
- Morris Major, an Australian car model (1958–1964)
- Morris Major (1931 to 1933), a British automobile
- Major film studios, often known collectively as the majors
- Major's, an American chain of department stores
- Majors (medical), the area of an emergency department that provides acute care to seriously ill patients
- Major, a Carroll's cigarette brand
- Major, an American tactical missile developed by Redstone Arsenal

== See also ==
- Major Major (band), a UK indie rock band
- Major Minor (disambiguation)
- Mayor (disambiguation)
- Maior
