= Major minor =

Major minor may refer to:

== Music ==
- Major and minor, the adjectives used to describe the tonality of a scale, key, or chord
- Major-minor tonality, a system of music in which specific hierarchical pitch relationships are based on a key "center" or tonic
- Major/minor composition, a musical composition that begins in a major key and ends in a minor key
- Major/Minor, an album by Thrice

== Other ==
- Academic majors and minors, the primary and secondary academic disciplines to which an undergraduate student formally commits.
- Major Minor Records, a record label started by Phil Solomon in 1966 and later bought by EMI
- Major Minor's Majestic March, a 2009 music video game for the Nintendo Wii
- The Major and the Minor, a 1942 romantic comedy film directed by Billy Wilder
- Major Minor, a character in the cartoon Snagglepuss
- Major minor, a species of fly in the genus Major

== See also ==
- Major (disambiguation)
- Minor (disambiguation)
