= 2026 Paris Major =

Premier Padel tournament held in Paris

- Date: 6 – 13 September
- Edition: 5th
- Category: Major
- Prize money: €1.044.849
- Location: (France) Paris, Major
- Venue: Stade Roland Garros
- Court speed: Slow

Champions
- Men's doubles: (Argentina) Agustín Tapia (Spain) Arturo Coello
- Women's doubles: (Spain) Andrea Ustero (Spain) Ariana Sánchez

Chronology

The 2026 Paris Major (officially 2026 Premier Padel Alpine Paris Major) was the seventeenth tournament of the fifth season organized by Premier Padel, the premier padel circuit, promoted by the International Padel Federation, and with the financial backing of Nasser Al-Khelaïfi's Qatar Sports Investments.

In the women's category, for the second time this season, neither of the top two pairs in the FIP rankings reached the final. In the title match, Andrea Ustero and Ariana Sánchez, the world's number 3 pair, defeated Claudia Fernández and Martina Calvo, securing their third title of the season and their first together in Paris (Ustero's first and Ariana's third, having previously won in 2023 and 2024).

In the men's category, the top two pairs in the FIP rankings both reached the final for the eleventh time this season, thus repeating the Paris Major final for the third consecutive year. In the deciding match, Agustín Tapia and Arturo Coello defeated Alejandro Galán and Federico Chingotto in a third-set tie-break, securing their ninth title of 2026 and successfully defending the title for the third year in a row.

== Relevant Data ==
=== Padel Conquers Roland Garros ===
The fifth edition of the Paris Major attracted 81,000 spectators, a record number that represents an increase of 17,000 fans, or 26.5%, compared to the 64,000 recorded in 2025.

=== Historic feat for Tapia and Coello in Paris ===
The men's final was a clash between the two top-ranked FIP pairs, marking their 40th meeting (with a 26–13 record favoring the world number ones). With this victory, Agustín Tapia and Arturo Coello, the "Golden Boys", demonstrated their strength by retaining the number one spot and cementing their status as the undisputed kings of Roland Garros, lifting the trophy in Paris for the fourth consecutive year.

== Seeds ==
Male

Rnk.	Team	FIP Ranking Points
1	(Argentina) Agustín Tapia (Spain) Arturo Coello	41818
2	(Spain) Alejandro Galán (Argentina) Federico Chingotto	35554
3	(Spain) Juan Lebrón (Argentina) Leandro Augsburguer	15987
4	(Argentina) Franco Stupaczuk (Spain) Jon Sanz	11757
5	(Spain) Coki Nieto (Spain) Mike Yanguas	11588
6	(Argentina) Martín Di Nenno (Spain) Paquito Navarro	11141
7	(Spain) Francisco Guerrero (Spain) Javi Leal	8656
8	(Brazil) Lucas Campagnolo (Spain) Momo González	7611
9	(Spain) Javier Garrido (Brazil) Lucas Bergamini	6471
10	(Argentina) Juan Tello (Argentina) Maximiliano Arce	5575
11	(Spain) Alejandro Ruiz (Spain) Javier Garcia Mora	5236
12	(Spain) Aimar Goñi (Spain) Eduardo Alonso	5144
13	(Spain) Juanlu Esbri (Argentina) Sanyo Gutiérrez	5052
14	(Spain) Alejandro Arroyo (Spain) Jose Jimenez Casas	4444
15	(United Arab Emirates) Inigo Jofre (Spain) Jairo Bautista	4386
16	(Spain) Javier Barahona (Argentina) Maximiliano Sánchez Blasco	3912

Female

Rnk.	Team	FIP Ranking Points
1	(Argentina) Delfina Brea (Spain) Gemma Triay	36138
2	(Spain) Bea González (Spain) Paula Josemaria	28451
3	(Spain) Ariana Sánchez (Spain) Andrea Ustero	21961
4	(Spain) Claudia Fernandéz (Spain) Martina Calvo	18178
5	(Spain) Marta Ortega (Portugal) Sofia Araújo	12794
6	(Argentina) Claudia Jensen (Spain) Tamara Icardo	12259
7	(Spain) Alejandra Alonso (Spain) Marina Guinart	8808
8	(Spain) Alejandra Salazar (Argentina) Aranzazu Osoro	8026
9	(Argentina) Martina Fassio Goyeneche (Spain) Veronica Virseda	6851
10	(Spain) Beatriz Caldera (Spain) Carmen Goenaga	6524
11	(Spain) Lorena Rufo (Spain) Victoria Iglesias	5016
12	(Spain) Jimena Velasco (Spain) Raquel Eugenio Barrera	4799
13	(Italy) Carolina Orsi (Spain) Patricia Llaguno	4751
14	(Italy) Giulia Dal Pozzo (Spain) Nuria Rodriguez	4629
15	(Spain) Jana Montes (Spain) Marta Barrera	3920
16	(Spain) Lucía Sainz (Spain) Sofia Saiz	3814

== Head-to-head record between teams ranked in the top 4 during the season ==
=== Men's ===
Record	Coello–Tapia	Galán–Chingotto	Augsburger–Lebrón	Sanz–Stupaczuk	Former Pairs	Stupaczuk–Yanguas
Coello–Tapia	—	7–4	7–1	—		5–0
Galán–Chingotto	4–7	—	4–2	—		3–0
Augsburger–Lebrón	1–7	2–4	—	—		—
Sanz–Stupaczuk	—	—	—	—		—
Former Pairs						
Stupaczuk–Yanguas	0–5	0–3	—	—		—

=== Women's ===
Record	D. Brea–Triay	B. González–Paula	Ariana–Ustero	C. Fernández–M. Calvo	Former Pairs	Araúijo–C. Fernández
D. Brea–Triay	—	3–5	6–3	1–2		3–0
B. González–Paula	5–3	—	4–3	1–2		2–0
Ariana–Ustero	3–6	3–4	—	1–0		1–0
C. Fernández–M. Calvo	2–1	2–1	0–1	—		—
Former Pairs
Araúijo–C. Fernández	0–3	0–2	0–1	—		—

== Draws ==
=== Men's Bracket ===
Round of 32
1	(Spain) Coello / (Argentina) Tapia	6	7
17	(Argentina) G. Alfonso / (Argentina) V. Libaak	2	5
18	(Argentina) L. Aguirre / (Spain) P.G. Rodrigo	1	0
11	(Spain) Á. Ruiz / (Spain) J.G. Mora	6	6
15	(United Arab Emirates) I. Jofre / (Spain) J. Bautista	6	7
41	(Italy) A. Patiniotis / (Spain) D. García	1	5
35	(Argentina) F. Mouriño / (Spain) M. Quilez	3	6
7	(Spain) F. Guerrero / (Spain) J. Leal	6	7
8	(Brazil) L. Campagnolo / (Spain) Momo	6	6
26	(Spain) F. Cabeza / (Paraguay) M. San Martin	3	4
WC	(Spain) N. Moragues / (France) T. Fonteny	4	6
14	(Spain) A. Arroyo / (Spain) J.J. Casas	6	7
16	(Spain) J. Barahona / (Argentina) M. Blasco	6	6	6
40	(United Arab Emirates) I. Vilariño / (Spain) J. Zamora	7	1	4
WC	(Belgium) C. Geens / (France) T. Leygue	0	2
3	(Spain) Lebrón / (Argentina) L. Augsburger	6	6
4	(Argentina) F. Stupaczuk / (Spain) J. Sanz	6	6
Q	(Argentina) F. Lopez / (Spain) F. Dal Bianco	4	2
Q	(Spain) J. Moya / (France) T. Leygue	6	4	7
13	(Spain) J. Esbri / (Argentina) Sanyo	2	6	5
9	(Spain) J. Garrido / (Brazil) L. Bergamini	1	6
24	(Spain) J. Martinez / (Spain) L.H. Quesada	6	7
19	(Spain) G. Collado / (Spain) P.H. Alvarez	2	2
6	(Argentina) Di Nenno / (Spain) Paquito	6	6
5	(Spain) Coki / (Spain) M. Yanguas	6	6
23	(Spain) J.G. Diestro / (Spain) M. Sintes	3	4
28	(Argentina) I. Piotto / (Argentina) J. Rubini	3	6	1
12	(Spain) A. Goñi / (Spain) E. Alonso	6	3	6
10	(Argentina) J. Tello / (Argentina) M. Arce	5	3
20	(Argentina) A. Chozas / (Argentina) J. De Pascual	7	6
Q	(United Arab Emirates) A. Ayats / (Spain) E. Chamero	2	2
2	(Argentina) Chingotto / (Spain) Galán	6	6

Round of 16
1	(Spain) Coello / (Argentina) Tapia	6	6
11	(Spain) Á. Ruiz / (Spain) J.G. Mora	4	3
15	(United Arab Emirates) I. Jofre / (Spain) J. Bautista	3	4
7	(Spain) F. Guerrero / (Spain) J. Leal	6	6
8	(Brazil) L. Campagnolo / (Spain) Momo	3	6	6
14	(Spain) A. Arroyo / (Spain) J.J. Casas	6	1	3
16	(Spain) J. Barahona / (Argentina) M. Blasco	6	6	4
3	(Spain) Lebrón / (Argentina) L. Augsburger	4	7	6
4	(Argentina) F. Stupaczuk / (Spain) J. Sanz	7	6
Q	(Spain) J. Moya / (France) T. Leygue	5	3
24	(Spain) J. Martinez / (Spain) L.H. Quesada	3	3
6	(Argentina) Di Nenno / (Spain) Paquito	6	6
5	(Spain) Coki / (Spain) M. Yanguas	4	3
12	(Spain) A. Goñi / (Spain) E. Alonso	6	6
20	(Argentina) A. Chozas / (Argentina) J. De Pascual	3	2
2	(Argentina) Chingotto / (Spain) Galán	6	6

Quarter-Final
1	(Spain) Coello / (Argentina) Tapia	6	7
7	(Spain) F. Guerrero / (Spain) J. Leal	2	5
8	(Brazil) L. Campagnolo / (Spain) Momo	3	6
3	(Spain) Lebrón / (Argentina) L. Augsburger	6	7
4	(Argentina) F. Stupaczuk / (Spain) J. Sanz	6	1	4
6	(Argentina) Di Nenno / (Spain) Paquito	4	6	6
12	(Spain) A. Goñi / (Spain) E. Alonso	6	2
2	(Argentina) Chingotto / (Spain) Galán	7	6

Semi-Finals
1	(Spain) Coello / (Argentina) Tapia	7	6
3	(Spain) Lebrón / (Argentina) L. Augsburger	5	3
6	(Argentina) Di Nenno / (Spain) Paquito	5	2
2	(Argentina) Chingotto / (Spain) Galán	7	6

Finals
1	(Spain) Coello / (Argentina) Tapia	6	4	7
2	(Argentina) Chingotto / (Spain) Galán	3	6	6

=== Women's Bracket ===
Round of 32
1	(Argentina) D. Brea / (Spain) G. Triay
Bye
Q	(Spain) B. Las Heras / (Spain) C. Mesa	6	2
14	(Italy) G. Dal Pozzo / (Spain) N. Rodriguez	7	6
13	(Italy) C. Orsi / (Spain) P. Llaguno	6	6
32	(Spain) M. Lobo / (Spain) M. Arellano	2	1
Q	(Mexico) C. Coellar / (United States) B. Dubins	3	0
LL	(Spain) A. Gasco / (Germany) V. Kurz	6	6
7	(Spain) A. Alonso / (Spain) M. Guinart	6	6
31	(Spain) J. Bautista / (Spain) M. Rivas	0	1
Q	(Spain) A. Martinez / (Spain) N. Lopez	0	1
16	(Spain) L. Sainz / (Spain) S. Saiz	6	6
9	(Argentina) M. Goyeneche / (Spain) V. Virseda	3	6	7
17	(Spain) J. Castelló / (Spain) M. Talavan	6	2	6
Bye
4	(Spain) C. Fernández / (Spain) M. Calvo
3	(Spain) A. Ustero / (Spain) A. Sánchez
Bye
18	(Spain) M.R. Abajo / (Spain) N. Canovas	7	1	3
11	(Spain) L. Rufo / (Spain) V. Iglesias	6	6	6
10	(Spain) B. Caldera / (Spain) C. Goenaga	6	6
27	(Spain) C. Escacena / (Spain) N. Aguilar	3	4
25	(Spain) M. Borrero / (Spain) T. Navarro	1	2
8	(Spain) A. Salazar / (Argentina) A. Osoro	6	6
5	(Spain) M. Ortega / (Portugal) S. Araújo	6	6
28	(Spain) A. Cañellas / (Spain) P. Fortun	1	2
23	(Spain) A. Perez / (Spain) M. Caparros	3	4
12	(Spain) J. Velasco / (Spain) R. Barrera	6	6
15	(Spain) J. Montes / (Spain) M. Barrera	6	6
Q	(Spain) C. Castillon / (Italy) L. Vano	4	4
Bye
2	(Spain) B. González / (Spain) P. Josemaria

Round of 16
1	(Argentina) D. Brea / (Spain) G. Triay	7	6
14	(Italy) G. Dal Pozzo / (Spain) N. Rodriguez	5	3
13	(Italy) C. Orsi / (Spain) P. Llaguno	6	6
LL	(Spain) A. Gasco / (Germany) V. Kurz	1	1
7	(Spain) A. Alonso / (Spain) M. Guinart	6	6
16	(Spain) L. Sainz / (Spain) S. Saiz	0	2
9	(Argentina) M. Goyeneche / (Spain) V. Virseda	6	1
4	(Spain) C. Fernández / (Spain) M. Calvo	7	6
3	(Spain) A. Ustero / (Spain) A. Sánchez	6	6
11	(Spain) L. Rufo / (Spain) V. Iglesias	1	2
10	(Spain) B. Caldera / (Spain) C. Goenaga	1	4
8	(Spain) A. Salazar / (Argentina) A. Osoro	6	6
5	(Spain) M. Ortega / (Portugal) S. Araújo	7	6
12	(Spain) J. Velasco / (Spain) R. Barrera	5	2
15	(Spain) J. Montes / (Spain) M. Barrera	1	0
2	(Spain) B. González / (Spain) P. Josemaria	6	6

Quarter-Final
1	(Argentina) D. Brea / (Spain) G. Triay	6	6
13	(Italy) C. Orsi / (Spain) P. Llaguno	0	3
7	(Spain) A. Alonso / (Spain) M. Guinart	6	2	4
4	(Spain) C. Fernández / (Spain) M. Calvo	2	6	6
3	(Spain) A. Ustero / (Spain) A. Sánchez	6	3	6
8	(Spain) A. Salazar / (Argentina) A. Osoro	3	6	2
5	(Spain) M. Ortega / (Portugal) S. Araújo	2	7	7
2	(Spain) B. González / (Spain) P. Josemaria	6	6	6

Semi-Finals
1	(Argentina) D. Brea / (Spain) G. Triay	4	2
4	(Spain) C. Fernández / (Spain) M. Calvo	6	6
3	(Spain) A. Ustero / (Spain) A. Sánchez	5	6	6
5	(Spain) M. Ortega / (Portugal) S. Araújo	7	4	1

Finals
4	(Spain) C. Fernández / (Spain) M. Calvo	2	0
3	(Spain) A. Ustero / (Spain) A. Sánchez	6	6

== Results ==
=== First Round ===
Men's

Date	Winners	Score	Opponent	Refs.
8/9/2026	(Argentina) Gonzalo Alfonso (Argentina) Valentino Libaak	6–4 / 3–6 / 6–1	(Spain) Francisco Manuel Gil (Spain) Pablo Lijó	
7/9/2026	(Argentina) Leonel Aguirre (Spain) Pablo Garcia Rodrigo	6–2 / 6–2	(Portugal) Miguel Deus (Portugal) Nuno Deus	
7/9/2026	(Italy) Aris Patiniotis (Spain) Diego Garcia Garcia	7–6 / 6–7 / 7–6	(Spain) Mario Del Castillo (Spain) Pincho Fernandez	
7/9/2026	(Argentina) Federico Mourino (Spain) Marc Quilez	6–1 / 7–5	(Spain) Daniel Santigosa (Argentina) Ramiro Valenzuela	
7/9/2026	(Spain) Francisco Cabeza (Paraguay) Mariano Gonzalez San Martin	6–4 / 7–6	(Spain) Mario Ortega (Spain) Victor Ruiz	
7/9/2026	(Spain) Nacho Moragues (France) Timeo Fonteny	6–1 / 6–4	(Spain) Álvaro Melendez Amaya (Spain) Jose Luis González	
7/9/2026	(Spain) Ignacio Vilariño (Spain) Juan Zamora Perez	6–3 / 3–6 / 6–3	(Spain) Andres Fernández Lancha (Italy) Denis Perino	
8/9/2026	(Belgium) Clement Geens (France) Dylan Guichard	6–0 / 6–2	(Spain) Javier Ruiz (Spain) Santiago Pineda	
8/9/2026	(Argentina) Facundo Rodrigo Lopez (Argentina) Franco Dal Bianco	6–2 / 6–1	(Italy) Facundo Dominguez (Argentina) Juan Cruz Belluati	
8/9/2026	(Spain) Jesus Moya (France) Thomas Leygue	7–6 / 6–4	(Spain) David Gala Sánchez (Italy) Enzo Jensen	
7/9/2026	(Spain) Javier Martinez (Spain) Luis Hernandez Quesada	7–5 / 6–3	(Italy) Alvaro Montiel Caruso (Spain) Gonzalo Rubio	
8/9/2026	(Spain) Guillermo Collado (Spain) Pol Hernandez Alvarez	6–1 / 6–4	(Spain) Alonso Rodriguez Martinez (Italy) Flavio Abbate	
8/9/2026	(Spain) Jose Garcia Diestro (Spain) Marc Sintes	7–5 / 6–2	(Spain) Enrique Goenaga (Spain) Manuel Castaño	
7/9/2026	(Argentina) Ignacio Piotto (Argentina) Juan Ignacio Rubini	7–5 / 6–4	(France) Jeremy Robert (France) Yoan Boronad	
8/9/2026	(Argentina) Alex Chozas (Argentina) Juan De Pascual	6–2 / 6–3	(Spain) Jose Solano Marmolejo (Argentina) Ramiro Pereyra	
8/9/2026	(United Arab Emirates) Arnau Ayats (Spain) Emilio Sánchez Chamero	7–6 / 6–2	(Argentina) Maxi Sánchez (Argentina) Lucho Capra	

Women's

Date	Winners	Score	Opponent	Refs.
8/9/2026	(Spain) Barbara Las Heras (Spain) Carla Mesa	7–6 / 4–6 / 6–4	(Spain) Letizia Manquillo (Spain) Lucia Martinez Gomez	
8/9/2026	(Spain) Marta Arellano (Spain) Marina Lobo	6–3 / 7–6	(France) Alix Collombon (Russia) Ksenia Sharifova	
8/9/2026	(United States) Brittany Dubins (Mexico) Camila Ramme Coellar	6–1 / 7–5	(Spain) Ivet Val Lopez (France) Louise Bahurel	
8/9/2026	(Spain) Julia Bautista (Spain) Mónica Rivas	6–0 / 6–3	(France) Carla Touly (Spain) Xenia Vidiella	
8/9/2026	(Spain) Aida Martinez Sanjuan (Spain) Natividad Lopez Diaz	6–0 / 3–6 / 6–3	(Portugal) Ana Catarina Nogueira (Italy) Caterina Baldi	
8/9/2026	(Spain) Jessica Castelló (Spain) Marta Talavan	6–3 / 7–6	(Argentina) Julieta Bidahorria (Argentina) Virginia Riera	
8/9/2026	(Spain) Maria Rodriguez Abajo (Spain) Noa Canovas	6–3 / 6–4	(Spain) Amanda Lopez Moral (Spain) Camila Fassio Goyeneche	
8/9/2026	(Spain) Claudia Escacena (Spain) Noemi Aguilar	6–3 / 6–1	(Spain) Lucia Peralta (Spain) Melania Merino	
8/9/2026	(Spain) Marta Borrero (Spain) Teresa Navarro	6–4 / 7–6	(Argentina) Daiara Valenzuela (France) Lea Godallier	
8/9/2026	(Spain) Ariadna Cañellas (Spain) Patricia Martinez Fortun	7–5 / 6–1	(Spain) Araceli Martinez (Spain) Laura Luján	
8/9/2026	(Spain) Agueda Perez (Spain) Marta Caparros	3–6 / 6–1 / 6–4	(Spain) Ana Dominguez Gracia (Spain) Sandra Bellver	
8/9/2026	(Spain) Carmen Castillon (Italy) Lorena Vano	6–4 / 7–5	(Italy) Giorgia Marchetti (Spain) Lara Arruabarrena	

=== Round of 32 ===
Men's

Date	Winners	Score	Opponent	Refs.
9/9/2026	(Argentina) Agustín Tapia (Spain) Arturo Coello	6–2 / 7–5	(Argentina) Gonzalo Alfonso (Argentina) Valentino Libaak	
9/9/2026	(Spain) Aléx Ruiz (Spain) Javier Garcia Mora	6–1 / 6–0	(Argentina) Leonel Aguirre (Spain) Pablo Garcia Rodrigo	
9/9/2026	(United Arab Emirates) Inigo Jofre (Spain) Jairo Bautista	6–1 / 7–5	(Italy) Aris Patiniotis (Spain) Diego Garcia Garcia	
9/9/2026	(Spain) Francisco Guerrero (Spain) Javi Leal	6–3 / 7–6	(Argentina) Federico Mourino (Spain) Marc Quilez	
9/9/2026	(Brazil) Lucas Campagnolo (Spain) Momo González	6–3 / 6–4	(Spain) Francisco Cabeza (Paraguay) Mariano Gonzalez San Martin	
9/9/2026	(Spain) Alex Arroyo (Spain) Jose Jimenez Casas	6–4 / 7–6	(Spain) Nacho Moragues (France) Timeo Fonteny	
9/9/2026	(Spain) Javier Barahona (Argentina) Maximiliano Sánchez Blasco	6–7 / 6–1 / 6–4	(Spain) Ignacio Vilariño (Spain) Juan Zamora Perez	
9/9/2026	(Spain) Juan Lebrón (Argentina) Leandro Augsburger	6–0 / 6–2	(Belgium) Clement Geens (France) Dylan Guichard	
9/9/2026	(Argentina) Franco Stupaczuk (Spain) Jon Sanz	6–4 / 6–2	(Argentina) Facundo Rodrigo Lopez (Argentina) Franco Dal Bianco	
9/9/2026	(Spain) Jesus Moya (France) Thomas Leygue	6–2 / 4–6 / 7–5	(Spain) Juanlu Esbri (Argentina) Sanyo Gutiérrez	
9/9/2026	(Spain) Javier Martinez (Spain) Luis Hernandez Quesada	6–1 / 7–6	(Spain) Javier Garrido (Brazil) Lucas Bergamini	
9/9/2026	(Argentina) Martin Di Nenno (Spain) Paquito Navarro	6–2 / 6–2	(Spain) Guillermo Collado (Spain) Pol Hernandez Alvarez	
9/9/2026	(Spain) Coki Nieto (Spain) Miguel Yanguas	6–3 / 6–4	(Spain) Jose Garcia Diestro (Spain) Marc Sintes	
9/9/2026	(Spain) Aimar Goñi (Spain) Eduardo Alonso	6–3 / 3–6 / 6–1	(Argentina) Ignacio Piotto (Argentina) Juan Ignacio Rubini	
9/9/2026	(Argentina) Alex Chozas (Argentina) Juan De Pascual	7–5 / 6–3	(Argentina) Juan Tello (Argentina) Maximiliano Arce	
9/9/2026	(Spain) Alejandro Galán (Argentina) Federico Chingotto	6–2 / 6–2	(United Arab Emirates) Arnau Ayats (Spain) Emilio Sánchez Chamero	

Women's

Date	Winners	Score	Opponent	Refs.
9/9/2026	(Italy) Giulia Dal Pozzo (Spain) Nuria Rodriguez	7–6 / 6–2	(Spain) Barbara Las Heras (Spain) Carla Mesa	
9/9/2026	(Italy) Carolina Orsi (Spain) Patricia Llaguno	6–2 / 6–1	(Spain) Marta Arellano (Spain) Marina Lobo	
9/9/2026	(Spain) Anna Ortiz Gasco (Germany) Victoria Kurz	6–3 / 6–0	(United States) Brittany Dubins (Mexico) Camila Ramme Coellar	
9/9/2026	(Spain) Alejandra Alonso (Spain) Marina Guinart	6–0 / 6–1	(Spain) Julia Bautista (Spain) Mónica Rivas	
9/9/2026	(Spain) Lucía Sainz (Spain) Sofia Saiz	6–0 / 6–1	(Spain) Aida Martinez Sanjuan (Spain) Natividad Lopez Diaz	
9/9/2026	(Argentina) Martina Fassio Goyeneche (Spain) Veronica Virseda	3–6 / 6–2 / 7–6	(Spain) Jessica Castelló (Spain) Marta Talavan	
9/9/2026	(Spain) Lorena Rufo (Spain) Victoria Iglesias	6–7 / 6–1 / 6–3	(Spain) Maria Rodriguez Abajo (Spain) Noa Canovas	
9/9/2026	(Spain) Beatriz Caldera (Spain) Carmen Goenaga	6–3 / 6–4	(Spain) Claudia Escacena (Spain) Noemi Aguilar	
9/9/2026	(Spain) Alejandra Salazar (Argentina) Aranzazu Osoro	6–1 / 6–2	(Spain) Marta Borrero (Spain) Teresa Navarro	
9/9/2026	(Spain) Marta Ortega (Portugal) Sofia Araújo	6–1 / 6–2	(Spain) Ariadna Cañellas (Spain) Patricia Martinez Fortun	
9/9/2026	(Spain) Jimena Velasco (Spain) Raquel Eugenio Barrera	6–3 / 6–4	(Spain) Agueda Perez (Spain) Marta Caparros	
9/9/2026	(Spain) Jana Montes (Spain) Marta Barrera	6–4 / 6–4	(Spain) Carmen Castillon (Italy) Lorena Vano	

=== Round of 16 ===
Men's

Date	Winners	Score	Opponent	Refs.
10/9/2026	(Argentina) Agustín Tapia (Spain) Arturo Coello	6–4 / 6–3	(Spain) Aléx Ruiz (Spain) Javier Garcia Mora	
10/9/2026	(Spain) Francisco Guerrero (Spain) Javi Leal	6–3 / 6–4	(United Arab Emirates) Inigo Jofre (Spain) Jairo Bautista	
10/9/2026	(Brazil) Lucas Campagnolo (Spain) Momo González	3–6 / 6–1 / 6–3	(Spain) Alex Arroyo (Spain) Jose Jimenez Casas	
10/9/2026	(Spain) Juan Lebrón (Argentina) Leandro Augsburger	4–6 / 7–6 / 6–4	(Spain) Javier Barahona (Argentina) Maximiliano Sánchez Blasco	
10/9/2026	(Argentina) Franco Stupaczuk (Spain) Jon Sanz	7–5 / 6–3	(Spain) Jesus Moya (France) Thomas Leygue	
10/9/2026	(Argentina) Martin Di Nenno (Spain) Paquito Navarro	6–3 / 6–3	(Spain) Javier Martinez (Spain) Luis Hernandez Quesada	
10/9/2026	(Spain) Aimar Goñi (Spain) Eduardo Alonso	6–4 / 6–3	(Spain) Coki Nieto (Spain) Miguel Yanguas	
10/9/2026	(Spain) Alejandro Galán (Argentina) Federico Chingotto	6–3 / 6–2	(Argentina) Alex Chozas (Argentina) Juan De Pascual	

Women's

Date	Winners	Score	Opponent	Refs.
10/9/2026	(Argentina) Delfina Brea (Spain) Gemma Triay	7–5 / 6–3	(Italy) Giulia Dal Pozzo (Spain) Nuria Rodriguez	
10/9/2026	(Italy) Carolina Orsi (Spain) Patricia Llaguno	6–1 / 6–1	(Spain) Anna Ortiz Gasco (Germany) Victoria Kurz	
10/9/2026	(Spain) Alejandra Alonso (Spain) Marina Guinart	6–0 / 6–2	(Spain) Lucía Sainz (Spain) Sofia Saiz	
10/9/2026	(Spain) Claudia Fernández (Spain) Martina Calvo	7–6 / 6–1	(Argentina) Martina Fassio Goyeneche (Spain) Veronica Virseda	
10/9/2026	(Spain) Andrea Ustero (Spain) Ariana Sánchez	6–1 / 6–2	(Spain) Lorena Rufo (Spain) Victoria Iglesias	
10/9/2026	(Spain) Alejandra Salazar (Argentina) Aranzazu Osoro	6–1 / 6–4	(Spain) Beatriz Caldera (Spain) Carmen Goenaga	
10/9/2026	(Spain) Marta Ortega (Portugal) Sofia Araújo	7–5 / 6–2	(Spain) Jimena Velasco (Spain) Raquel Eugenio Barrera	
10/9/2026	(Spain) Bea González (Spain) Paula Josemaría	6–1 / 6–0	(Spain) Jana Montes (Spain) Marta Barrera	

=== Quarter-Finals ===
Men's

Date	Winners	Score	Opponent	Refs.
11/9/2026	(Argentina) Agustín Tapia (Spain) Arturo Coello	6–2 / 7–5	(Spain) Francisco Guerrero (Spain) Javi Leal	
11/9/2026	(Spain) Juan Lebrón (Argentina) Leandro Augsburger	6–3 / 7–6	(Brazil) Lucas Campagnolo (Spain) Momo González	
11/9/2026	(Argentina) Martin Di Nenno (Spain) Paquito Navarro	4–6 / 6–1 / 6–4	(Argentina) Franco Stupaczuk (Spain) Jon Sanz	
11/9/2026	(Spain) Alejandro Galán (Argentina) Federico Chingotto	7–6 / 6–2	(Spain) Aimar Goñi (Spain) Eduardo Alonso	

Women's

Date	Winners	Score	Opponent	Refs.
11/9/2026	(Argentina) Delfina Brea (Spain) Gemma Triay	6–0 / 6–3	(Italy) Carolina Orsi (Spain) Patricia Llaguno	
11/9/2026	(Spain) Claudia Fernández (Spain) Martina Calvo	2–6 / 6–2 / 6–4	(Spain) Alejandra Alonso (Spain) Marina Guinart	
11/9/2026	(Spain) Andrea Ustero (Spain) Ariana Sánchez	6–3 / 3–6 / 6–2	(Spain) Alejandra Salazar (Argentina) Aranzazu Osoro	
11/9/2026	(Spain) Marta Ortega (Portugal) Sofia Araújo	2–6 / 7–6 / 7–6	(Spain) Bea González (Spain) Paula Josemaría	

=== Semi-Finals ===
Men's

Date	Winners	Score	Opponent	Refs.
12/9/2026	(Argentina) Agustín Tapia (Spain) Arturo Coello	7–5 / 6–3	(Spain) Juan Lebrón (Argentina) Leandro Augsburger	
12/9/2026	(Spain) Alejandro Galán (Argentina) Federico Chingotto	7–5 / 6–2	(Argentina) Martin Di Nenno (Spain) Paquito Navarro	

Women's

Date	Winners	Score	Opponent	Refs.
12/9/2026	(Spain) Claudia Fernández (Spain) Martina Calvo	6–4 / 6–2	(Argentina) Delfina Brea (Spain) Gemma Triay	
12/9/2026	(Spain) Andrea Ustero (Spain) Ariana Sánchez	5–7 / 6–4 / 6–1	(Spain) Marta Ortega (Portugal) Sofia Araújo	

=== Finals ===
Men's

Date	Winners	Score	Opponent	Refs.
13/9/2026	(Argentina) Agustín Tapia (Spain) Arturo Coello	6–3 / 4–6 / 7–6	(Spain) Alejandro Galán (Argentina) Federico Chingotto	

Women's

Date	Winners	Score	Opponent	Refs.
13/9/2026	(Spain) Andrea Ustero (Spain) Ariana Sánchez	6–2 / 6–0	(Spain) Claudia Fernández (Spain) Martina Calvo	
