= Major (given name) =

Major is an English-language given name, which often causes confusion with the military rank of the same name.

People with the name or nickname include:

== Arts and entertainment ==
- Major Dodson (born 2003), American actor
- Major Harris (singer) (1947–2012), American R&B singer
- Klaus Heuser (born 1957), German rock guitarist and producer
- Major Holley (1924–1990), American jazz musician
- Major Jackson (born 1968), American poet
- Major Lance (1939–1994), American R&B singer
- Major (American musician) (born 1984), American pop soul musician and actor Major R. Johnson Finley

== Politics ==
- Major Andre Andrews (1792–1834), American politician
- Major Coxson (1929–1973), American politician
- Major M. Hillard (1896–1977), American politician
- Major Knight (1812–1891), American politician
- Major Logue (1826–1900), Australian politician
- Major C. Mead (1858–1925), American politician
- Major Olímpio (1962–2021), Brazilian politician
- Major Owens (1936–2013), American politician
- Major Thibaut (born 1977), American politician

== Sports ==
- Major Applewhite (born 1978), American football quarterback and coach
- Major Booth (1886–1916), English cricketer
- Major Burns (born 2002), American football player
- Major Culbert (born 1987), American football player
- Major Davis (1882–1959), English cricketer
- Major Everett (born 1960), American football player
- Major Kerby Farrell (1913–1975), American baseball player and manager
- Major Goodsell (1900–1988), Australian rower
- Major Harris (American football) (born 1968), American football player
- Major Jones (born 1953), American basketball player
- Major Ritchie (1870–1955), English tennis player
- Major Taylor (1878–1932), American cyclist nicknamed "Major"
- Major Wingate (1983–2021), American basketball player
- Major Wright (born 1988), American football player

== Other fields ==
- Major Downes (1834–1923), British Army general
- Major Garrett (born 1962), American journalist
- Major Greenwood (1880–1949), English scientist
- Major B. Harding (born 1935), American judge in Florida
- Major Rohde Hawkins (1821–1884), English architect
- Major Nichols (1914–2005), English cycle-maker
- Moogy Sumner, Aboriginal Australian elder, dancer and cultural adviser

== See also ==
- Major (disambiguation), which includes fictional characters
