= John Mair =

John Mair may refer to:

- John Mair (philosopher) (1467–1550, also called John Major), Scottish philosopher and historian
- John Mair (journalist), British journalist and academic
- John Mair (architect) (1876–1959), New Zealand government architect (1923–1941)
- John Mair (sprinter) (born 1963), Jamaican sprinter

== See also ==
- John Maire (1703–1771), English Roman Catholic conveyancer
- John Major (disambiguation)
- John Mayer (disambiguation)
- John Meier (disambiguation)
