= Collins & Aikman =

Manufacturer of decorative fabrics and automotive supplies

Collins & Aikman Corporation
- Type: Defunct
- Industry: Auto parts
- Founded: 1891
- Defunct: 2007
- Fate: Ceased operations
- Headquarters: Southfield, Michigan, United States
- Products: Automotive interior components, systems and modules, plastic components and cockpits, soft trim and convertible roof systems, instrument panels, fully assembled cockpit modules, floor and acoustic systems, automotive fabric and interior trim, exterior trim and trim set, backlights, and tonneau covers and power actuating systems
- Revenue: ▲$3.983 billion USD (2005)
- Operating income: ▼$102.00 million USD (2005)
- Net income: ▼$57.00 million USD (2005)
- Number of employees: 14,000 (2006)

Collins & Aikman Corporation was an automotive manufacturer of cockpit modules and automotive floor and acoustic systems and a supplier of instrument panels, automotive fabric, plastic based trim and convertible top systems. The Company's operations spanned 15 countries, incorporating about 120 facilities and approximately 25,000 employees. It entered Chapter 11 bankruptcy on May 17, 2005 and went out of business on October 12, 2007.

== Business summary ==
Collins & Aikman Corporation (C&A) was engaged primarily in the design, engineering and manufacture of automotive interior components, systems and modules. The company supplied products from three main categories: plastic components and cockpits, soft trim and convertible roof systems. Its products included instrument panels, fully assembled cockpit modules, floor and acoustic systems, automotive fabric and interior trim, as well as exterior trim and trim set, backlights, well slings, tonneau covers and power actuating systems.

In North America, Collins & Aikman manufactured components for approximately 90% of all light vehicle production platforms. Sales were primarily made to North American-based original equipment manufacturers (OEMs), as well as Asian- and European-based OEMs. It conducted all of its operating activities through its wholly owned subsidiary Collins & Aikman Products Co.

=== Decorative Fabric group ===
Collins & Aikman was also involved in the manufacturing of decorative fabrics and in 1976 acquired Mastercraft Corporation of Spindale, North Carolina, the world's largest maker of woven Jacquard fabrics. Andrew Major, Mastercraft's owner, became president of the Collins & Aikman Decorative Fabric group, overseeing its seven plants and 6000 employees. They developed a synthetic material with the name Sherpa that resembles wool. Sherpa was a registered trademark of Collins & Aikman.

== History ==
Collins & Aikman began in 1891 when Charles M. Aikman, who joined Gibbons L. Kelty's home furnishings business in 1870, became partners with William Collins, with Kelty's interest being sold. The company went public in 1916 with the sale to Thomas Doody and Melville Curtis. The company acquired Bangor Mills of Pennsylvania in 1960 and Imperial Paper in 1971.

The Wickes Companies bought Collins & Aikman in 1987 for $1.16 billion, soon afterwards suffering an embarrassment when it was found that the company had sold carpeting which did not meet fire safety standards. The next year The Blackstone Group and Wasserstein Perella bought Wickes and changed its name to WCI Holdings Corp., which in turn changed its name to Collins & Aikman in 1992.

Also in 1992, Collins & Aikman moved its headquarters from California to Charlotte, North Carolina.

In March 1998, Collins & Aikman submitted a site plan for a move by its headquarters to Northfield Hills Corporate Center in Troy, Michigan. The carpet and acoustic group, automotive fabrics and Akro floor mats were moving from Bloomfield Hills, Michigan, and Dura Convertible Systems was moving from Madison Heights, Michigan, while the Manchester Plastics unit acquired in 1996 and renamed Collins & Aikman Plastics was already in Troy. The company kept about 100 employees in various departments in Charlotte, where it had operations for 25 years, until 2003. In 2002, after the acquisition of the Textron Automotive trim unit, the company announced plans to move its operations to Stephenson Highway, where the plastics unit was already located.

=== Entering into bankruptcy ===
In early 2005 the firm had to review its 2004 results due to accounting problems. It then suffered a liquidity crisis which resulted in the ousting of the chairman and CEO, David Stockman, in early May, followed by the Chapter 11 filing.

After filing for bankruptcy in Europe in May 2005 and in the United States in July 2005, Collins & Aikman announced April 6, 2006 that it would close four North Carolina plants. This included one plant in Farmville with 650 workers and three plants employing 590 in Person County, where the company was the largest employer and had been in Roxboro since 1923. Three other North Carolina plants employing 1,244 would continue operating in Albemarle, Old Fort and Montgomery County. The fate of the El Paso, Texas plant and its 75 workers was uncertain.

The Albemarle unit, started in the 1950s, became International Automotive Components in 2007. In September 2017 the Old Fort operation, with 700 employees, became part of a United Kingdom-based joint venture between Shanghai Shenda Co. Ltd. and International Automotive Components called Auria Solutions, Ltd., with U.S. headquarters in Southfield, Michigan and 21 plants in 10 countries.

This was followed in July 2011 by a British High Court ruling which put 24 C&A companies across 10 European countries into English administration proceedings, recognising that these companies operated as a cohesive unit and would need to be dealt with holistically.

== SEC lawsuit ==
On March 26, 2007 the SEC filed civil fraud charges against C&A, David Stockman and eight other former C&A directors and members. The suit alleged that C&A had inflated its quarterly earnings from the end of 2001 to 2005, by using "round-trip" transactions with Elkin B MacCallum, a member of C&As board, and a supplier to C&A, to falsely increase reported indirect income. It then engaged in other acts of false accounting to further increase its reported earnings.

The SEC settled with five of the defendants in 2010, with the settlement including David Stockman paying $7.2 million in settlement. A judge found that the SEC is entitled to no special treatment regarding its discovery obligations when it initiates litigation.
