= John Meyer =

John Meyer may refer to:

== Politics ==
- John Meyer (Illinois politician) (1852–1895), American politician and lawyer
- John Ambrose Meyer (1899–1969), Maryland congressman
- John P. Meyer (1920–2013), American politician and judge
- John R. Meyer (legislator) (1930–2010), American physicist and politician in Wisconsin

== Sports ==
- John Meyer (American football) (1942–2020)
- John-Hubert Meyer (born 1993), South African rugby union player
- Jack Meyer (educator and cricketer) (1905–1991), English educationalist
- Jack Meyer (1932–1967), American baseball player
- John Meyer (born 1983), Canadian soccer player for Danbury United

== Other ==
- John Meyer (artist) (born 1942), South African painter
- John Meyer (audio engineer) (born before 1949), loudspeaker designer
- John Austin Meyer (1919–1997), American aerial photographer and chemist
- John C. Meyer (1919–1975), U.S. Air Force general
- John Charles Meyer (born before 2000), American actor and film producer
- John R. Meyer (1927–2009), American economist
- John S. Meyer (1924–2011), American doctor
- John Stryker Meyer (born 1946), author of Across the Fence: The Secret War in Vietnam
- John V. Meyer III, United States Army general
- John W. Meyer (born 1935), American sociologist
- John Meyer (settler), 19th-century Canadian settler of what is now Wilmot, Ontario

== See also ==
- John Meyers (disambiguation)
- John Meier (disambiguation)
- John Mayer (disambiguation)
