= Sherpa (fabric) =

Fabric with a pile on one side and flat on the other, resembling wool or sheepskin

Sherpa is a fabric with a pile on one side and flat on the other side. The name was a registered trademark of Collins & Aikman, an American manufacturer of decorative fabrics and automotive supplies, who first developed this fabric.

Sherpa is a curly piled fabric structure made of synthetic yarns like acrylic or polyester. The texture is soft and fluffy, useful in jackets resembling wool or sheepskin on the piled side. Sherpa fleece is a knitted type of fabric usable in lined clothing and winter wear.

== See also ==
- Polar fleece
