= David Major =

American psychologist (1904–1990)

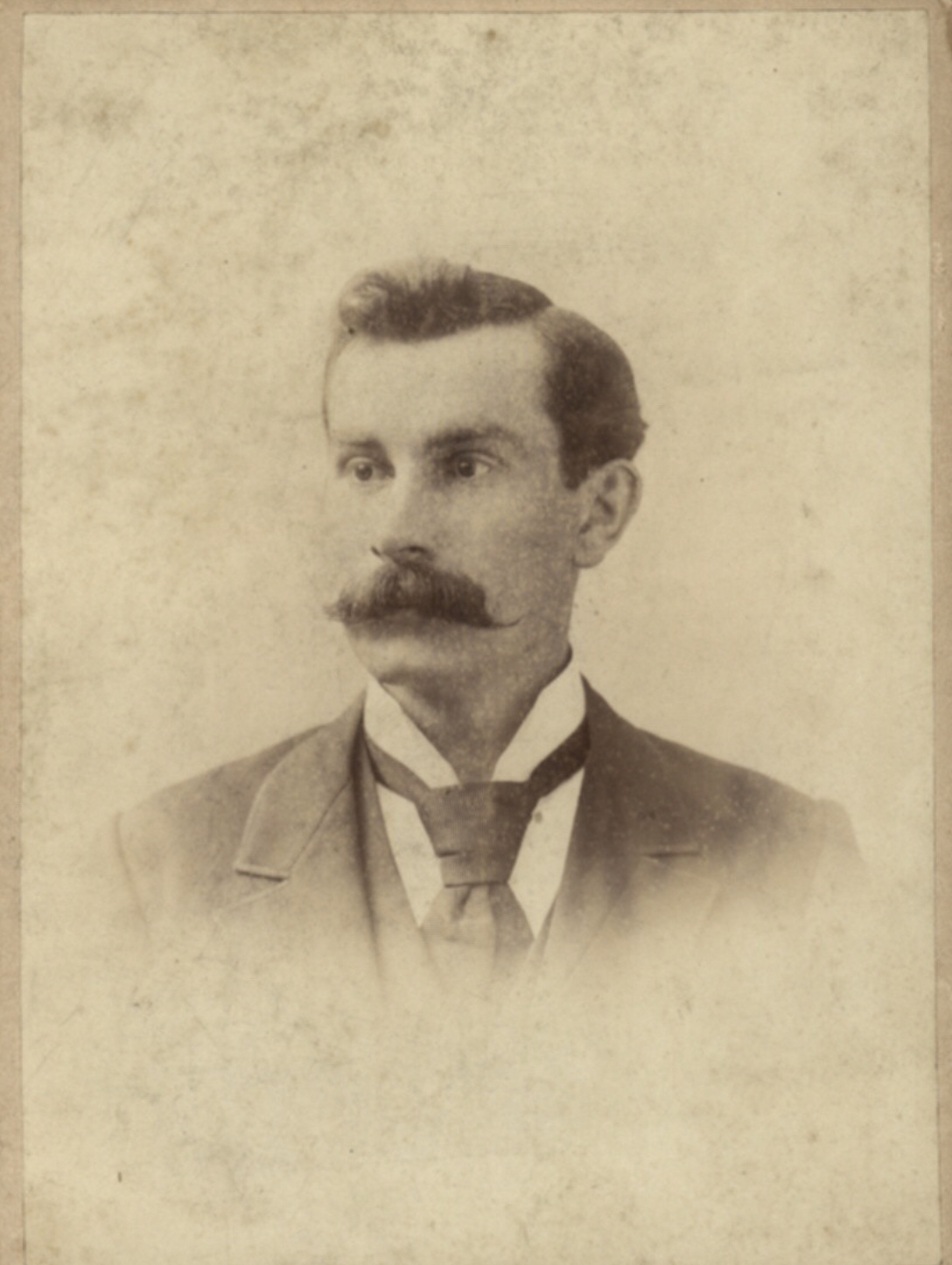
- Major circa 1890
- Born: March 26, 1866; Antioch, Clinton County, Indiana, U.S.
- Died: June 3, 1936; Bloomington, Indiana, U.S.
- Education: Wabash College; Cornell University; Columbia University; Indiana University Robert H. McKinney School of Law
- Spouse(s): Cleo Gautier, Mary Campbell
- Children: 2
- Parents: Thomas. M Major (father); Almeda Allen (mother)
- Relatives: George D. Major (great uncle)
- Scientific career
- Fields: Psychology
- Workplaces: University of Nebraska; Columbia University; Ohio State University

David Major (March 26, 1866 – July 3, 1936) was an American psychologist and author from Antioch, Clinton County, Indiana.

== Early life ==
Major was born on March 26, 1866, in Antioch, Clinton County, Indiana to Thomas and Almeda Major. He received his Bachelor of Science at Wabash College in 1890. In 1896 he received his doctorate in philosophy from Cornell University.

== Career ==
In 1897 he published his first book “The principle of teleology in the critical philosophy of Kant”. He received his diploma of education from Columbia University in 1899 and taught for one year at the University of Nebraska before transferring to Columbia University and teaching for one year. In 1901 he became a professor in psychology at Ohio State University and had his first son.

In 1903 he had his second son, and in 1906 he wrote his second book “First steps in mental growth”. In 1913 he wrote his third and final book “Elements of psychology”. He retired his teaching career in 1914, and in 1916 he received his bachelor in law from Indiana University Robert H. McKinney School of Law.

He died in 1936 at the age of 70, and is buried at the Greenlawn cemetery in Frankfort, Indiana.
