= Major Nichols =

Major Albert Nichols
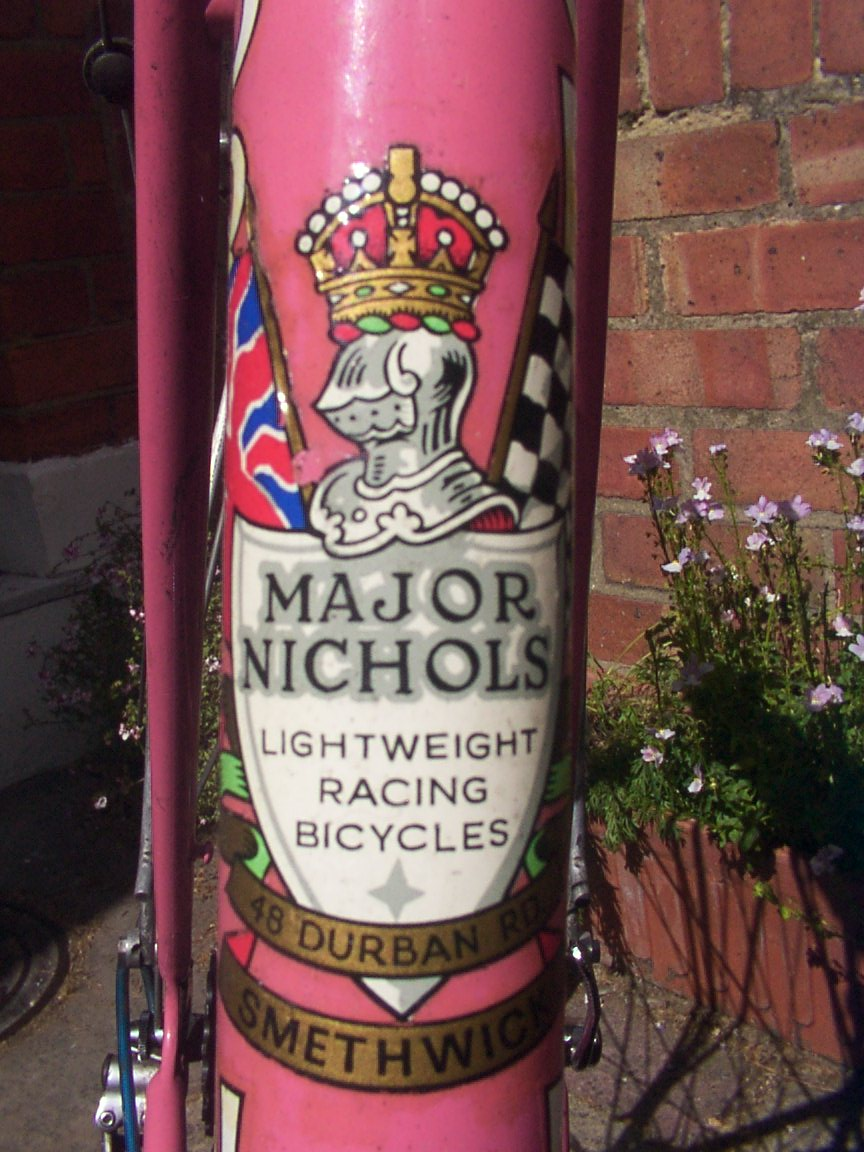
- Major Nichols Smethwick crest
- Born: September 17, 1914; West Bromwich, England
- Died: August 3, 2005 (aged 90); Smethwick, England
- Occupation: Cycle-frame builder
- Years active: 1950s–1995
- Employer: Nichols Cycles
- Known for: Hand-built lightweight racing bicycles
- Notable work: Track frame presented to Brian Robinson (1956)

Major Albert Nichols (17 September 1914 – 3 August 2005) was the last of the craftsmen cycle makers of the West Midlands of England. He was born in West Bromwich in his father's cycle shop at 5 Reform Street. Major was a frequent name in Birmingham and the Black Country.

He trained in the electrical industry and served in the Royal Navy during the Second World War. On the death of his father in 1947, he took over the business and taught himself lightweight cycle-frame building, which he carried out in West Bromwich from the early 1950s until 1971 when the area was redeveloped.

Nichols moved to a former shop at 48 Durban Road in nearby Smethwick. His last frame was built in 1995. He was a vice-president of the Hill Top Cycling Club and at its 21st anniversary dinner in 1956 he presented one of his early track frames to the first Briton to finish the Tour de France, Brian Robinson.

His cycles were ridden to success by Anthony Taylor, Paul Carbutt, Roy Cox, Ray Ward, Phil Bayton and others.
