= Andrew Major =

Hungarian-born American businessman (1921–2004)

- Born: August 18, 1921; Hungary
- Died: October 15, 2004 (aged 83); New York City, United States
- Resting place: Arlington National Cemetery
- Occupations: Upholstery fabric manufacturer, art collector, philanthropist
- Known for: Mastercraft Corporation
- Board member of: Mastercraft Corporation, Collins & Aikman, Joan Fabrics Corp.
- Spouse: Flora
- Children: Katherine, Nicholas
- Awards: American Furniture Hall of Fame (2002), DuPont Lifetime Leadership Award (1995)

Andrew Major (August 18, 1921 – October 15, 2004) was a Hungarian-born American businessman called "a preeminent textile pioneer" by the American Furniture Hall of Fame Foundation Inc. He was president and major shareholder of Mastercraft Corporation in Spindale, North Carolina, a company he built into the largest manufacturer of Jacquard fabrics in the world.

== World War II service ==
Andrew Major was educated in Switzerland and England. Following the rise of Nazi Germany and Antisemitism, he came to Canada while still in his teens then moved to the United States in 1940. During World War II, he served in the Pacific Theater with the United States Army, 96th Infantry Division. For his actions during combat in the Philippines and Okinawa, he received the Combat Infantryman Badge and Bronze Star Medal.

== Business career ==
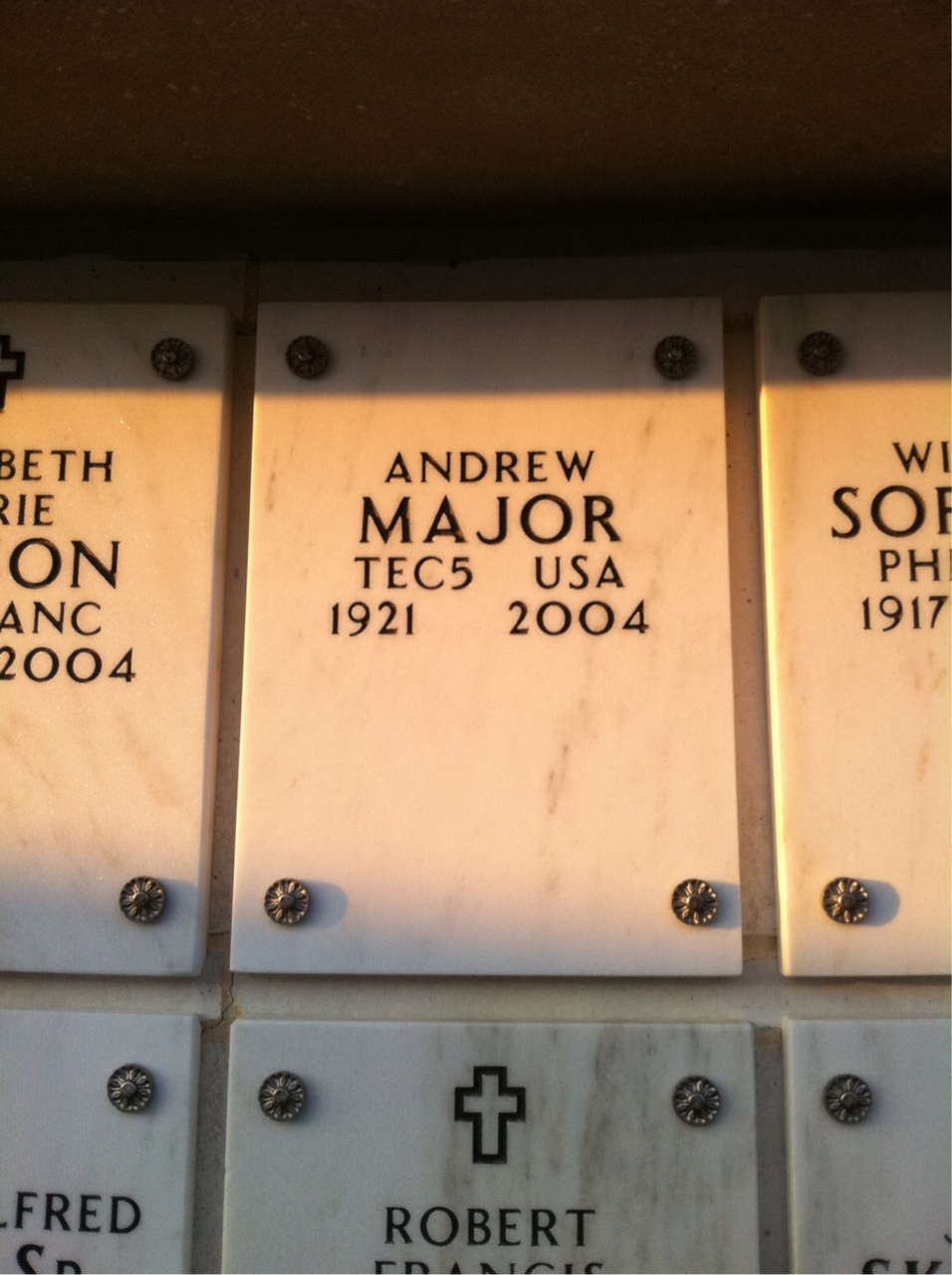
Major's grave at Arlington National Cemetery

Discharged from the Army at the end of the War, in 1946 Andrew Major went to work for Mastercraft Weaving Corporation, a textile manufacturer located in New Jersey. He rose to become the company's sales manager and, after operations relocated to the growing furniture industry hub in North Carolina, in 1960 became Mastercraft's president. In 1969, Andrew Major and Harry Turpan bought out the shareholders of the company then sold the thriving business in 1976 to Collins & Aikman who would appoint Major as president of their Decorative Fabric division and a member of the board of directors. In 1994, he retired from Collins & Aikman and in recognition of his contribution to the industry, in 1995 he received the DuPont Lifetime Leadership Award. At age 74, he came out of retirement to serve as a consultant to Cone Mills Corporation for whom he established a Jacquard operation. In 1999, he was elected to the Board of Directors of Joan Fabrics Corp. which had acquired the Mastercraft group.

Longtime art collectors, Andrew and Flora Major donated various pieces from their collection to Isothermal Community College in Spindale, North Carolina where they also established the Andrew Major Scholarship Fund.

Andrew Major died at age 83 on October 15, 2004, in New York City where he had lived since 1997. He was interred at Arlington National Cemetery.
