= Majors (surname) =

Majors is a surname. Notable people with the surname include:

- Alexander Majors (1814–1900), American businessman
- Bobby Majors (born 1949), American football player
- Jake Majors (born 2002), American football player
- Johnny Majors (1935–2020), American football player and coach
- Jonathan Majors (born 1989), American actor
- Kerrick Majors (1972–1987), African-American murder victim
- Orville Lynn Majors (1961–2017), American nurse and serial killer
- Shirley Majors (1914–1981), American football coach, father of Johnny
- Thomas Jefferson Majors (1841–1932), American politician

== See also ==
- Lee Majors, stage name of Harvey Lee Yeary (born 1939), American actor
- Major (surname)
