= John W. Maher =

American politician

John W. Maher (June 10, 1866 – May 10, 1917) was an American politician and a veterinarian. He served as a Republican member of the South Dakota House of Representatives from 1913 to 1914.

== Biography ==
John W. Maher was born near Freeport, Illinois to Irish immigrants, James Thomas Maher (January 1, 1842 – March 10, 1923) and Anna (Farley) Maher (November 11, 1839 – September 3, 1907). In 1873, Maher came with his family from Illinois to Dakota Territory, settling in Union County. On May 31, 1887, he married Barbara A. Cooper (August 6, 1861 – August 29, 1937), the daughter of Prussian immigrants. Two of the couple's five children died in infancy.

Maher engaged in business in Beresford, South Dakota and learned that he did not like it. In spite of a lack of college training, Maher obtained a veterinary license and practiced at a veterinary hospital in Beresford.

In the fall of 1911, Maher was one of sixty or seventy men from Beresford who attended a meeting in Sioux Falls, South Dakota. The meeting was called by Dr. Hanson of Brookings, South Dakota for the purpose of organizing plans for a new highway, which would pass from Winnipeg, Manitoba, Canada to the Gulf of Mexico. The highway was eventually known as US Highway Number 77, which was completed in the fall of 1939.

In 1912, Maher was elected to represent the first district of the state Legislature in the South Dakota House of Representatives. He spent his last three years in failing health and used a wheelchair during that time. He died in his sleep. During the hour of John W. Maher's funeral, all businesses in Beresford, South Dakota were closed by proclamation of the Mayor.
