= Antioch, Clinton County, Indiana =

Antioch
- Unincorporated community and Census-designated place
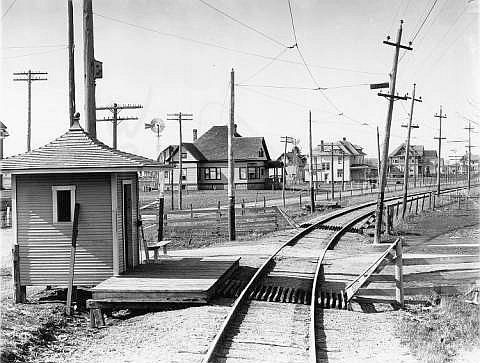
- Rail line and platform in Antioch, 1909

- Location within Clinton County, Indiana
- Coordinates: 40°13′39″N 86°30′21″W
- Country: United States
- State: Indiana
- County: Clinton
- Township: Jackson
- Elevation: 883 ft (269 m)
- ZIP code: 46041
- FIPS code: 18-01810
- GNIS feature ID: 2830341

Antioch is an unincorporated community in Jackson Township, Clinton County, Indiana.

Antioch was first settled in 1828.

== Demographics ==
The United States Census Bureau delineated Antioch as a census designated place in the 2022 American Community Survey.
