= John Austin Meyer =

American aerial photographer and chemist

- Born: September 18, 1919; St. Marys, Pennsylvania
- Died: January 28, 1997; Pittsburgh, Pennsylvania
- Citizenship: United States
- Occupation(s): Aerial photographer and professor
- Spouse: Marion Rich Waterman
- Children: 1

John Austin Meyer (St. Marys September 18, 1919 - Pittsburgh January 28, 1997) was an aerial photographer in the US Army Air Forces during World War II and a professor of Nuclear and Radiation Chemistry.

== Life ==
Meyer was born in St. Marys on September 18, 1919. In Saint Mary's Catholic High School he participated in camera club continuing into the towns camera club, and at the age of 21 he worked as a photographer and pursued studies in chemistry.

Meyer enlisted in the United States Army Air Corps on March 18, 1941. After basic training in Langley Field, Virginia he was assigned to Dow Field, Bangor, Maine. After initially being put off by the army because he couldn't bring his photographic equipment, he befriending Corporal Busch who got promoted to Sergeant, and helped Meyer into the photography department. Meyer had a four-month training program in aerial photography at the Air Force Photo School in Denver, then assigned to the US base at Gander, Newfoundland in August 1942 as chief photographic officer.

Among other aerial photographers in Gander, his work helped create the first aerial mapping and photographic studies of cloud formations taken by the Air Corps in the area. He also assisted in anti submarine spotting patrol and other classified flight missions.

After being discharged in 1955, Meyer enrolled at Pennsylvania State University and received a bachelor's degree and masters in chemistry and worked as an analytical research chemist at Gulf Research and Development Company. He then was awarded a research fellowship at the State University of New York's College of Forestry eventually becoming a faculty member. He trained in nuclear and radiation chemistry at Brookhaven National Laboratory, and became a professor of Nuclear and Radiation Chemistry at the university.

Meyer developed a method of impregnating wood with a liquid polymer still in use today for wood floorings, handles, and musical instruments.

Studying for his PhD, he met and married Marion Waterman during her masters who eventually retired as Assistant Dean Emeritus of the School of Management at Syracuse University. John and Marion would go on to develop scholarships and awards for students at various colleges. John died in Pittsburgh on January 28, 1997.
