= John Meyer (artist) =

South African painter (born 1942)

- Born: 13 August 1942 (age 83); Bloemfontein, South Africa
- Citizenship: South Africa
- Occupation: Painter

John Meyer (born 13 August 1942 in Bloemfontein South Africa) is a South African painter.

He has exhibited extensively in South African and abroad specialising in landscapes and portraits (including portraits of Nobel laureates Nelson Mandela and FW De Klerk and concert pianist Vladimir Horowitz) in a photo-realist style. More recently he describes his work as falling into what he terms a "narrative genre" where paintings are often part of a series (usually three to six) of chronological scenes.

He has exhibited at the Slater Memorial Museum (Connecticut) and the Everard Read Gallery (Johannesburg).
