= Dan T. Major =

Israeli chemist

- דן מאיור
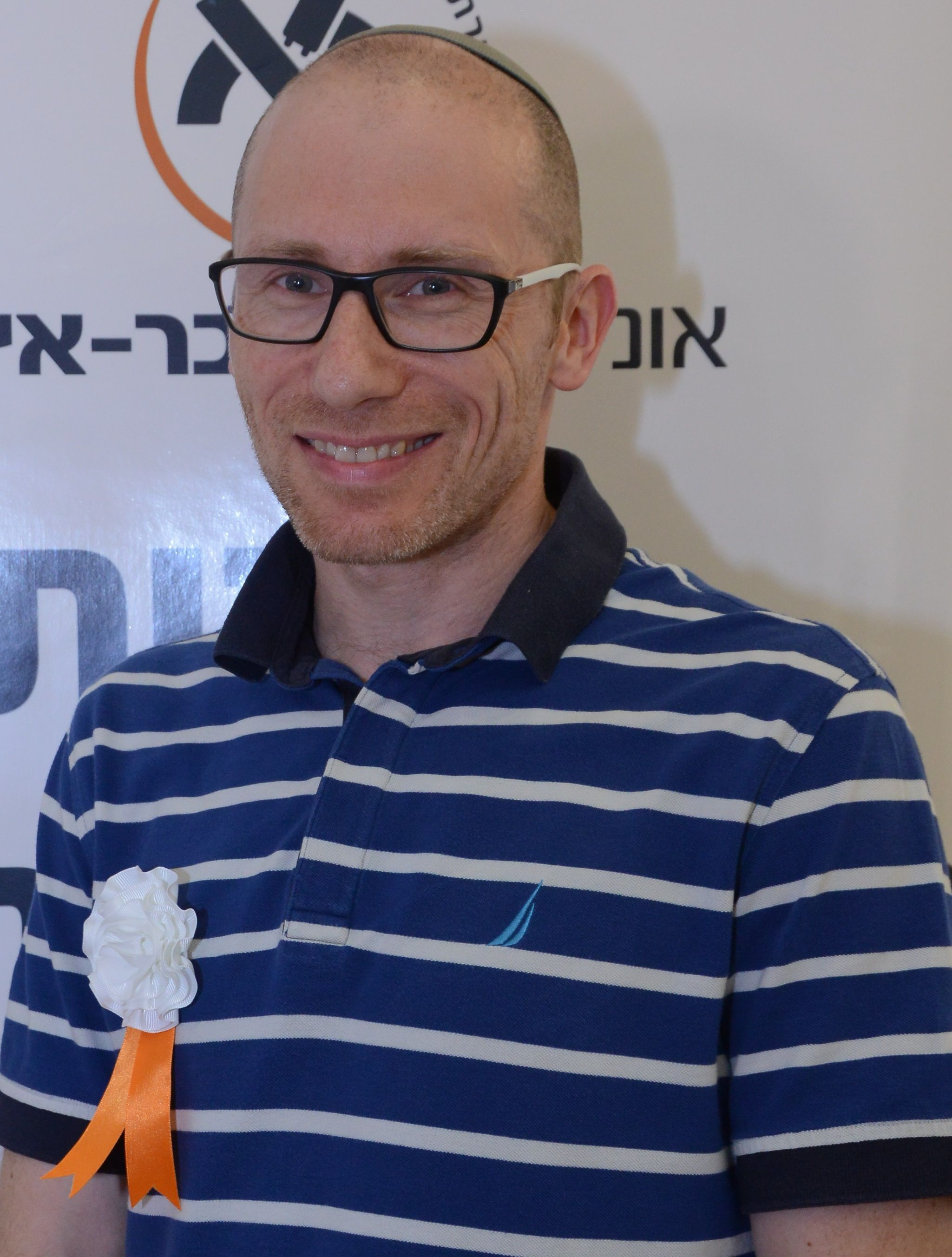
- Born: March 22, 1973 (age 53); Norway
- Citizenship: Israeli
- Education: Bar Ilan University
- Awards: Krill Prize (Wolf Foundation)
- Scientific career
- Fields: Computational chemistry, computational biochemistry, computational nanotechnology
- Workplaces: Bar-Ilan University
- Doctoral advisor: Bilha Fischer
- Other academic advisors: Jiali Gao (University of Minnesota)

Dr. Dan Thomas Major (Hebrew: דן מאיור; born 22 March 1973) is a professor of chemistry at Bar Ilan University, specializing in computational chemistry.

== Biography ==
Dan Major obtained his Ph.D. from the Chemistry Department at Bar-Ilan University (BIU) in 2003, followed by three years as a postdoctoral fellow at the University of Minnesota working with Prof. Jiali Gao. In 2007 he moved to the Chemistry Department at Bar-Ilan University, where he is now a full professor.

== Scientific interests and publications ==
Major's research focuses on computational approaches to chemistry, biochemistry, and nanotechnology. These include the development of simulation methods, a study of enzyme reactions and protein dynamics, understanding natural product synthesis, development of protein-ligand docking programs, in silico design of Li-ion batteries, and fuel cell modeling. He develops classical and quantum simulation methods, and in particular tools for studying enzyme catalysis. This includes the development of path-integral methods for the simulations of zero-point energy and tunneling effects in condensed phase environments, methods for free energy simulations, and novel docking approaches. The simulation tools are typically used in conjunction with hybrid Quantum Mechanics/Molecular Mechanics (QM/MM) methods and have been applied to a wide range of enzymes. Enzymatic systems studied in his research group include proton and hydride transfer reactions and terpene syntheses. Additionally, Prof. Major has carried out numerous studies on physical and electrochemical properties of magnesium and lithium-ion batteries and fuel cells using modern quantum chemistry tools.

Among his awards is Excellence in teaching (2016–2017); Krill Prize of the Wolf Foundation (2009); Alon Fellowship (2008–2010); Fulbright Scholarship (2003–2004); Excellent young scientist from the Israeli Chemical Society (2001).

== Personal life ==
Dan Thomas Major is married to Laura Major, a Ph.D. in English literature from Bar-Ilan University, who serves as the Head of the English Department at Achva Academic College. They live in Yad Binyamin and have five children.
