= John Major (publisher) =

English publisher and bookseller

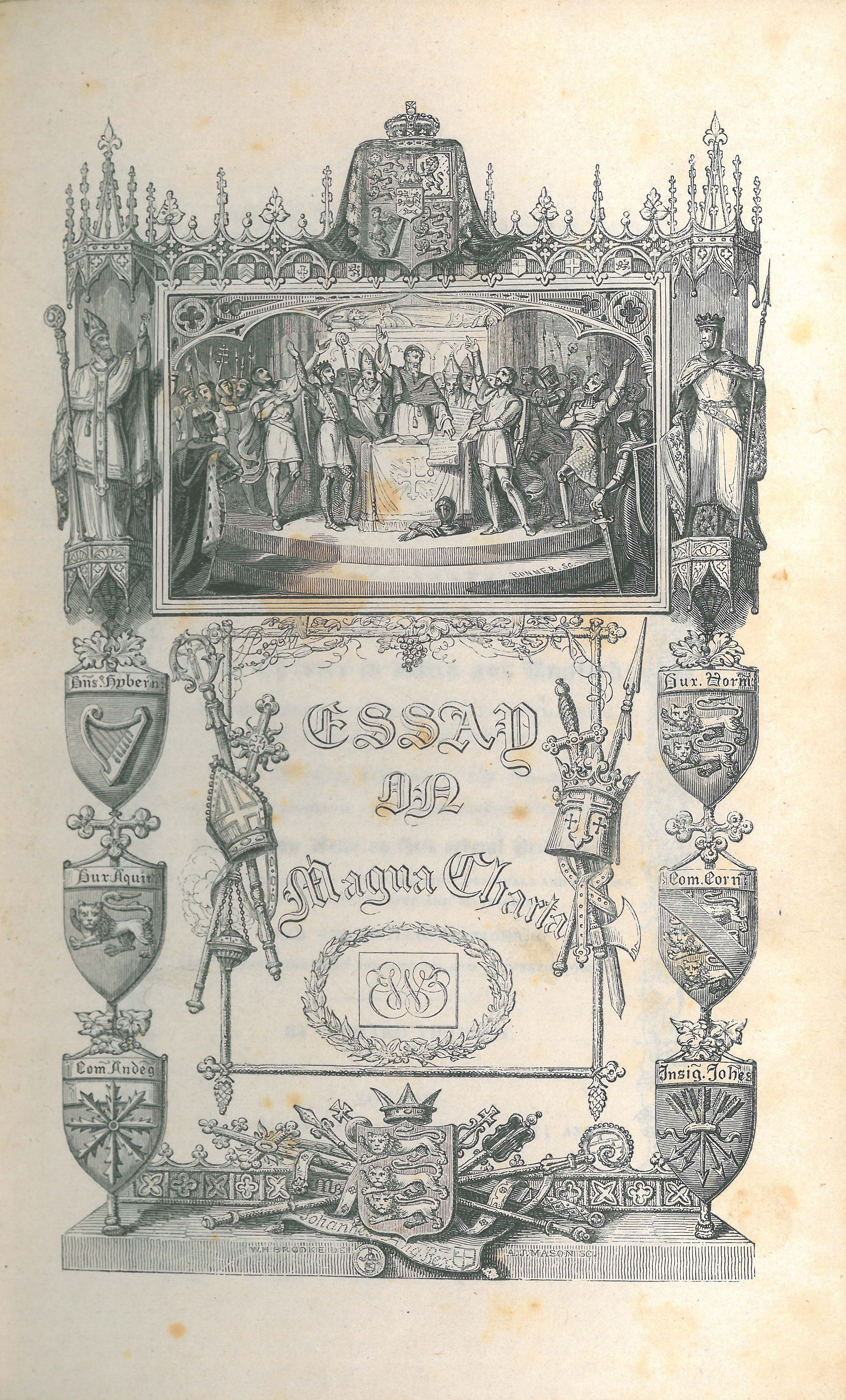
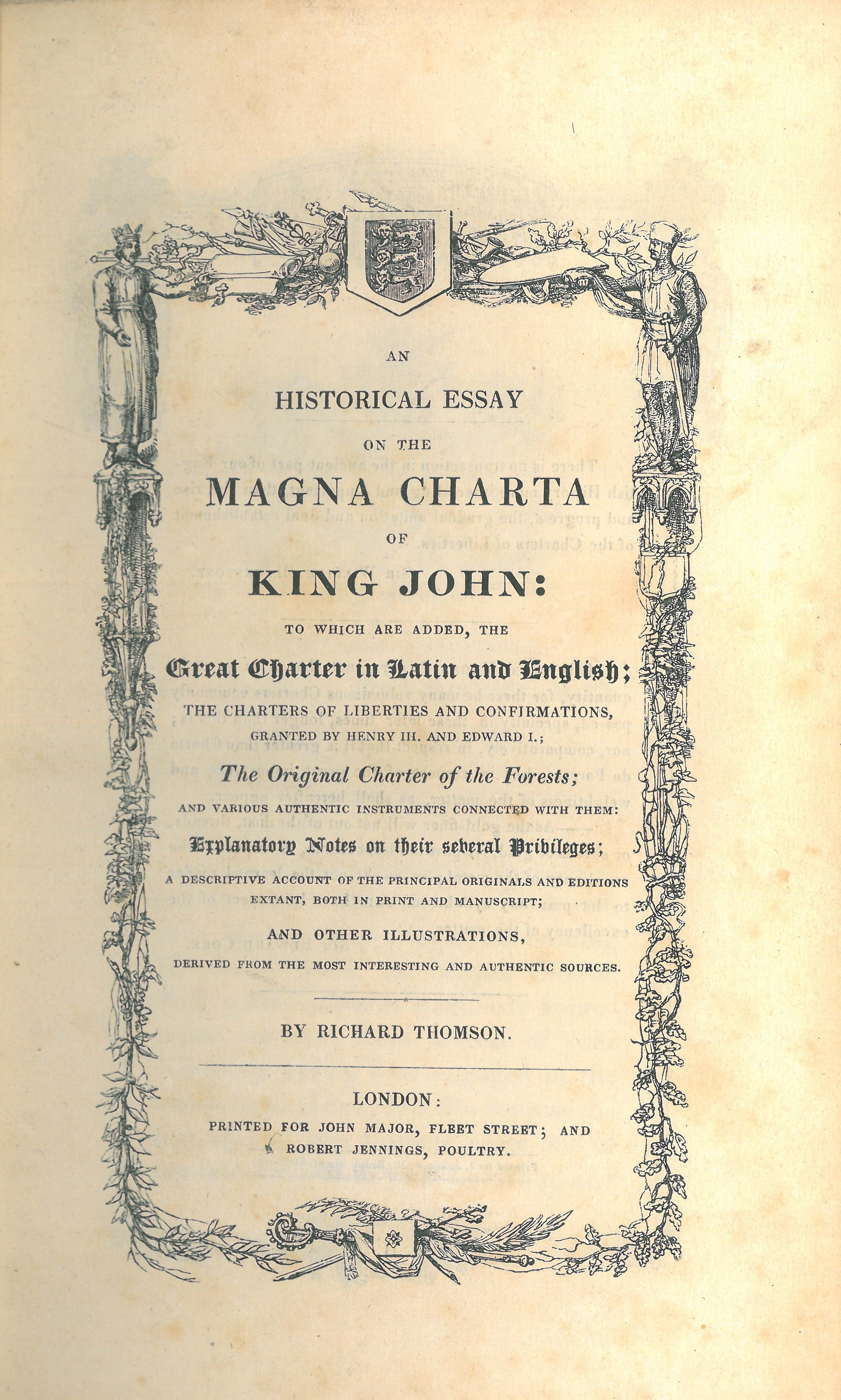
The engraved and ordinary title pages of An Historical Essay on the Magna Charta of King John (1829), a lavishly illustrated book by Richard Thomson published by Major

John Major (1782 – 9 January 1849) was an English publisher and bookseller, responsible for many books including illustrated editions of The Compleat Angler.

== Life and work ==
He was the son of Samuel Major of Duke Street, London. He started his bookselling and publishing business in a small shop in the gateway of St Bartholomew's Hospital, London.

He is known for his "beautiful edition" of Izaak Walton's Compleat Angler which he published in 1823; it proved so popular that he produced reprints and further editions with additional illustrations in 1824, 1833, 1839, 1844 and 1847. He also published editions of John Bunyan's Pilgrim's Progress complete with a biography of Bunyan by Robert Southey (1830) and Daniel Defoe's Robinson Crusoe, for which book he wrote a preface wishing "the reader a good appetite for, and a healthy digestion of, the banquet here provided".

Major's business affairs were never well managed, and he allowed himself to become dangerously involved in speculative ventures with a bibliographer named Thomas Frognall Dibdin. This eventually led, after many changes of address, to bankruptcy, and he "obtained an asylum in the Charterhouse", where he died.
