= George Major (cricketer) =

Australian cricketer

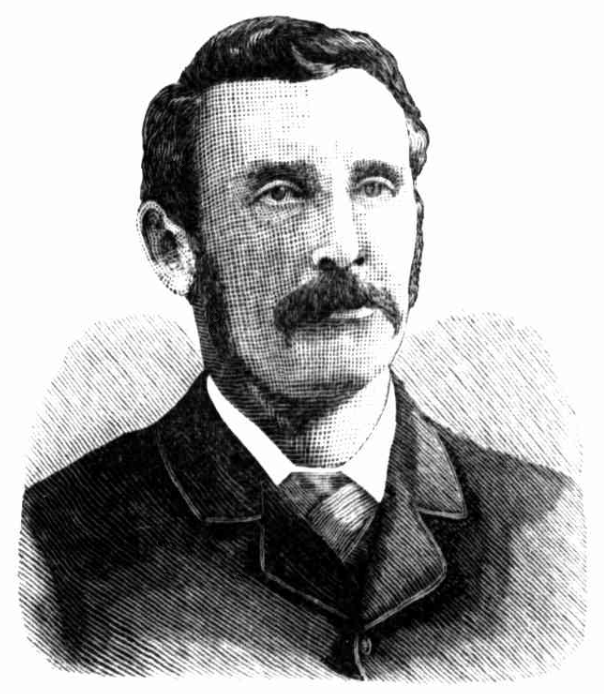

Personal information
- Born: 20 March 1851; Langport, Somerset, England
- Died: 16 October 1921 (aged 70); Melbourne, Australia

Domestic team information
- Years: Team
- 1879: Victoria
- Source: Cricinfo, 21 July 2015

George Major (20 March 1851 – 16 October 1921) was an Australian cricketer. He played one first-class cricket match for Victoria in 1879.

Major attended the Church of England Grammar School in Melbourne where he was successful in school cricket, football, gymnastics, and running, and in 1868 he began studying law at Melbourne University. In 1879 he represented Victoria in a game against an English touring side and he scored the winning runs. He worked in sports administration for many years serving as Vice-President of the South Melbourne Football Club, the South Melbourne Cricket Club, and the Victorian Cricketers Association. He was also a cricket selector for Victoria by the late 1880s.

== See also ==
- List of Victoria first-class cricketers
