= Major (fly) =

Scientific classification
- Kingdom: Animalia
- Phylum: Arthropoda
- Class: Insecta
- Order: Diptera
- Family: Dolichopodidae
- Subfamily: incertae sedis
- Genus: Major; Evenhuis, 2005
- Species: M. minor

Binomial name
- Major minor (Parent, 1938)

Synonyms
- Paraliancalus minor Parent, 1938; Eurynogaster minor (Parent, 1938)

Genus of flies

Major is a genus of flies in the family Dolichopodidae, endemic to Hawaii. It contains only one species, Major minor. It is part of the Eurynogaster complex of genera. The generic name is derived from the Latin major ("large"), referring to the extremely large tarsal claws of M. minor.
