= John Mayer (disambiguation) =

John Mayer (born 1977) is an American singer-songwriter and guitarist.

John Mayer may also refer to:

- John Mayer (composer) (1930–2004), Indian jazz composer and violinist
- John D. Mayer, American psychologist

== See also ==
- John Meyer (disambiguation)
- John Meier (disambiguation)
- John Maher (disambiguation)
- John Mayor (disambiguation)
