= George D. Major =

Indiana Politician

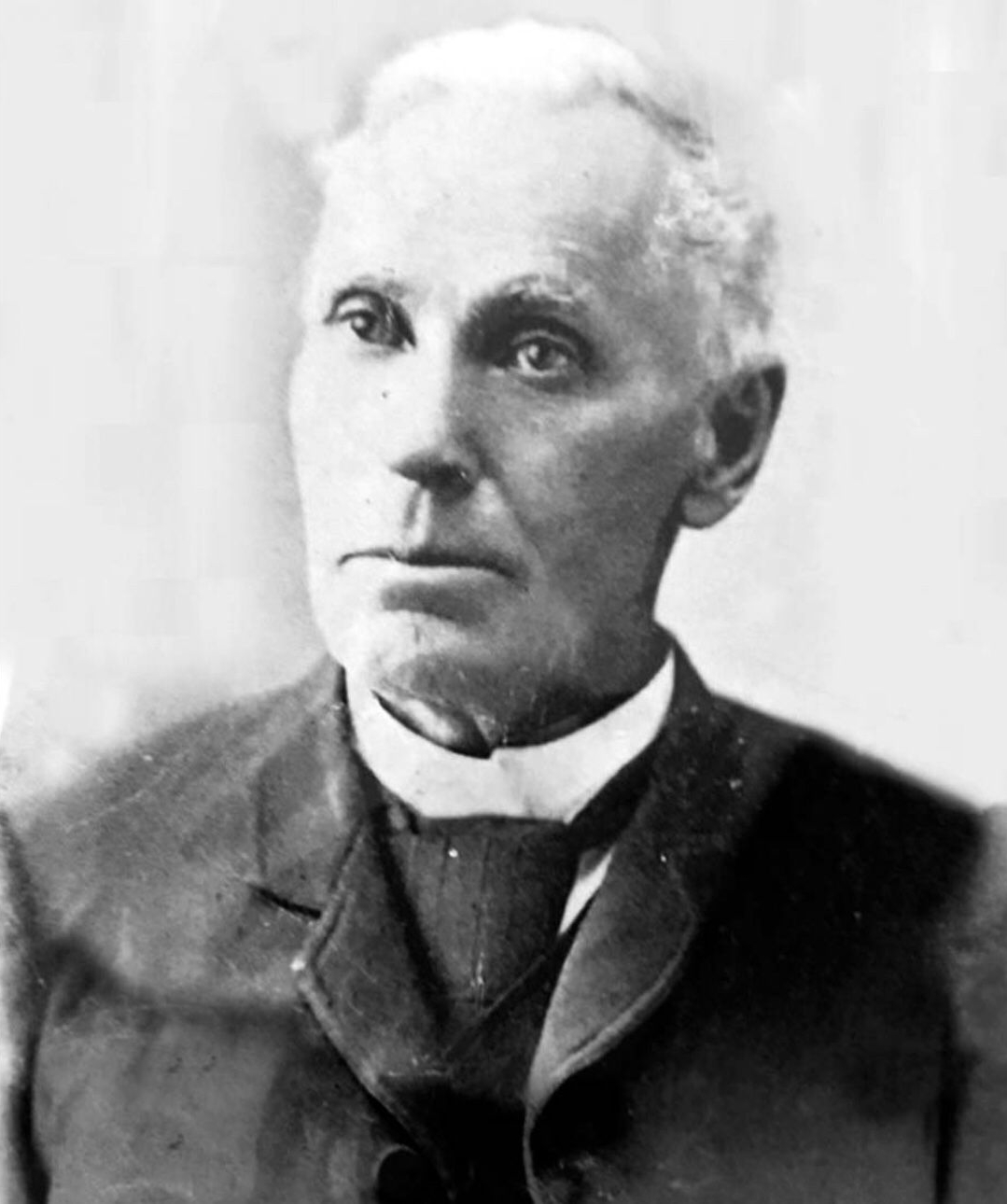

county commission
- In office 1866–1869
- Preceded by: Samual McCullough
- Succeeded by: Jared Benjamin

Indiana State Senator representing White, Benton, Jasper, and Newton counties
- Incumbent
- Assumed office 1874

President of the Board of Prison Directors, for the Indiana State Prison at Michigan City, Indiana
- In office 1883–1891

Personal details
- Born: 18 September 1819 Hamilton County, Ohio, US
- Died: 23 February 1902 (aged 82) Mulberry, Indiana, US
- Resting place: Dayton, Indiana, US
- Party: Conservative Democrat, and greenback party
- Spouse(s): Julia Ann Snoddy; Susan P. Urton
- Children: William S. Major, Chalmers Major, John F. Major, Mary C. Major, Charles S. Major, Sarah A Major, George E Major, Julia Major
- Parents: Thomas Major (father); Catherine Green Major (mother)
- Relatives: David Major (great nephew)
- Occupation: politician, businessman, agriculturist

George D. Major (September 18, 1819 – February 23, 1902) was an American politician, agriculturist, and businessman. He owned and operated The Remington Press, a politically neutral newspaper.

== Early life ==
Major was born in Hamilton County, Ohio and was the second youngest son of Thomas Major, an immigrant from County Down Ireland, and his second wife, Catherine. He moved with his parents to Clinton County, Indiana in 1831. As a child, he was required to work on the farm, and he enjoyed studying and reading.

At age 30, he began teaching school and did so for multiple winters. In 1864, after the death of both of his parents, he moved to a farm about 1 mi (1.6 km) north of Remington, Indiana.

== Career ==
In 1866, he was elected county commissioner, and served three years. In 1872, he was a delegate to the 1872 Liberal Republican convention in Cincinnati, Ohio, where Horace Greely was elected.

Major was elected to the Indiana State Senate in 1874, representing the counties of White, Benton, Jasper, and Newton. He was an elector on the Peter Cooper ticket in 1876. He was re-elected to the state senate in 1878, and was appointed by Governor James D. Williams as a delegate to the National Commercial convention held in Chicago in 1878.

The same year he relocated to a 410-acre (170 ha) farm, known as Treat Durand Farm, about 3 mi (4.8 km) southwest of Remington. He served as a member of the Board of Prison Directors for the Indiana State Prison from 1883 until about 1891. He was considered one of the best agriculturists in the county.

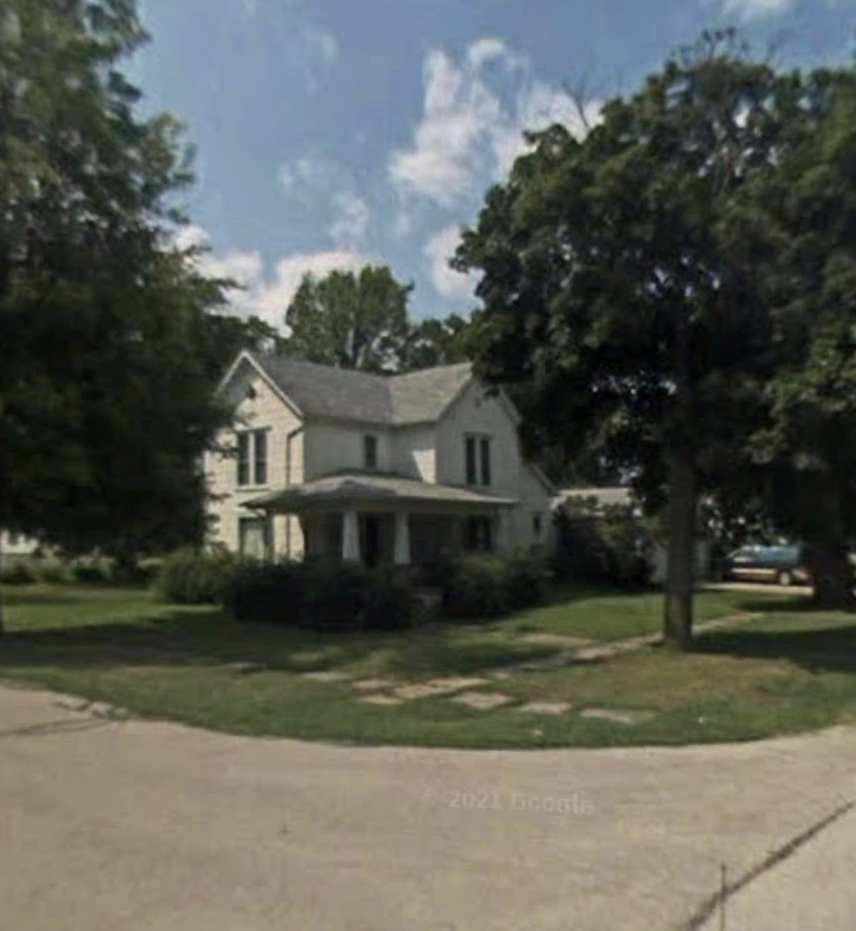
Major's residence at 400 N Indiana Street in Remington, Indiana

Major was a Conservative Democrat, but also sided with the Greenback Party. He was in favor of the free coinage of silver. His first wife, Julia Ann Snoddy, died in 1886. He married Susan P. Urton, of Kentland, Indiana, in 1889. In 1890, he purchased The Remington News and renamed it The Remington Press. He improved the paper's circulation by almost doubling the number of copies of any other newspaper in the town.

Major helped found "The Remington Fair Associate" and was elected as its first president. During his five years as president, the organization gained a reputation as the best organization of its kind in northern Indiana. The grounds of the organization were located near Major's original farm, about 1 mile north of Remington, at the southernmost part of Carpenters Grove. Located on the grounds were a number of stalls, a woman's art building, an amphitheater, judges stands, and one of the best half-mile racetracks in Indiana. Major also owned a furniture business with his son John F. Major, after purchasing it from George F. Bloom in the spring of 1891.
