= John Major (cricketer) =

English cricketer

John Major (6 February 1861 – 30 December 1930) was an English cricketer active from 1888 to 1889 who played for Sussex. He was born in Seaford and died in Wakefield. He appeared in twelve first-class matches as a righthanded batsman who bowled right arm medium pace. He scored 363 runs with a highest score of 106 and took three wickets with a best performance of two for 10.
