= John Meier =

John Meier may refer to:

- John Meier (folklorist) (1864–1953), German philologist and ethnographer
- John Meier (politician) (born 1946), Australian politician
- John H. Meier (born 1933), American associate of Howard Hughes involved in the Watergate Scandal
- John P. Meier (1942–2022), American Biblical scholar and Catholic priest

== See also ==
- John Mayer (disambiguation)
- John Meyer (disambiguation)
