= List of people from Des Moines, Iowa =

This is a list of people born in, residents of, or otherwise closely associated with the city of Des Moines, Iowa.

== Entertainers ==
- S. Torriano Berry, film producer, writer, and director
- Bruce Brubaker, pianist and Juilliard School faculty member
- Dorothy Byrne, opera singer
- Claiborne Cary, actress
- Virginia Christine, actress, Mrs. Olson in over 100 commercials for Folgers Coffee; attended Elmwood Elementary School in Des Moines
- Stephen Collins, actor, 7th Heaven
- Bill Daily, actor, best known as Capt. Roger Healey on I Dream of Jeannie, and Howard Borden on The Bob Newhart Show
- Jay Norwood "Ding" Darling, editorial cartoonist, received the 1924 and 1943 Pulitzer Prize for Editorial Cartooning
- Sarah Darling, country music singer-songwriter
- Nicholas Downs, actor
- Rusty Draper, singer
- Ben Easter, actor and photographer
- Hope Emerson, actress
- Cyrus Fees, mixed martial arts/pro wrestling TV announcer
- Roy Halston Frowick, fashion designer who rose to international fame in the 1970s
- Gordon Gebert, actor
- Juanita Hansen, silent film actress and anti-drug spokeswoman
- Peter Hedges, writer of What's Eating Gilbert Grape; director of film Pieces of April
- Alan J. Higgins, producer and writer for television
- David Anthony Higgins, actor, Malcolm in the Middle
- Steve Higgins, producer, actor, comedian, writer, and announcer of The Tonight Show Starring Jimmy Fallon
- Harriet Hilliard, film and TV actress, singer, The Adventures of Ozzie and Harriet, Ozzie Nelson and His Orchestra
- Frank Jenks, actor
- Aliza Knox, author, columnist, public speaker and non-executive director
- Cloris Leachman, 1971 Academy Award in The Last Picture Show, Golden Globe in 1976 for Best Lead Actress in a Comedy Series as Phyllis Lindstrom in Phyllis, one Daytime Emmy and eight Primetime Emmy Award-winning actress and, as of 2016, the record for most wins by a performer; inducted into the Television Academy Hall of Fame in 2011; participant in Miss America
- Phyllis Love, actress
- Marilyn Maye, singer and musical actress
- Maryhelen Mayfield, ballet dancer and arts administrator
- Charles McGraw, actor
- Frank Miller, editorial cartoonist, received the 1963 Pulitzer Prize for Editorial Cartooning for his editorial cartoon on nuclear warfare
- Jason Momoa, actor best known as Khal Drogo in Game of Thrones, and as Aquaman in the DCEU
- Conrad Nagel, silent film actor and a founder of the Academy of Motion Picture Arts and Sciences (AMPAS); hosted the 3rd and 5th Academy Awards and co-hosted with Bob Hope the 25th Academy Awards
- Vivienne Osborne, stage and film actress
- B. J. Palmer, once an owner of the radio station WHO in Des Moines, the person who hired Ronald Reagan as a sports broadcaster at WOC radio, which he also owned
- Chris Pirillo, television personality and technology figure
- Dante Powell, stand-up comedian
- Ronald Reagan, actor and president of the United States, was a radio sports announcer in Des Moines
- Brandon Routh, actor, best known for title role in Superman Returns
- Martin Spellman, actor
- Bill Stewart, jazz drummer, worked with Pat Metheny
- Stephen Stucker, actor, best known for role as air traffic controller in 1980 movie Airplane!
- India Summer, adult film actress
- Tiny Tim, ukulele musician, performed at Monterey Pop Festival and frequently opened for The Doors at The Scene with Jimi Hendrix in the audience
- Tionne "T-Boz" Watkins, member of TLC, Grammy-winning R&B singer
- Andy Williams, singer
- Gregory Alan Williams, actor
- Roger Williams, pianist and recording artist
- Wally Wingert, voice actor and radio personality

== Sports ==
- Kareem Al Allaf (born 1998), American tennis player who has played for Syria and the US
- Michael Annett, NASCAR Sprint Cup Series driver for JR Motorsports
- Chris Ash, since 2016 season, Rutgers football head coach; played and coached at Drake University
- Rob Ash, longtime Drake University head football coach, ranks in the Top 20 for wins among active college football coaches through the 2015 season
- Steve Bartkowski, NFL quarterback
- William Bell Jr., Negro league baseball player
- Casey Blake, Major League Baseball (MLB) player
- Matt Bobo, soccer player
- Matt Bullard, NBA player; color commentator for Houston Rockets telecasts
- Liang Chow, Olympic gymnastics coach of Shawn Johnson in 2008 Olympics and Gabby Douglas in 2012 Olympics
- Caitlin Clark, WNBA player
- Scott Clemmensen, NHL hockey player
- Gabby Douglas, first African American or first of African descent of any nationality in Olympic history to be individual all-around champion; member of United States women's national gymnastics team at 2012 Summer Olympics, where she won gold medals in individual all-around and team competitions; also member of gold-winning team at 2011 and 2015 World Championships; at 2016 Summer Olympics she won gold in team competition, becoming first U.S. gymnast to win gold in both individual all-around and team competitions at same Olympics; trained full-time with coach Liang Chow at Chow's gym in West Des Moines
- Harold Ely, NFL player
- Joel Hanrahan, pitcher for Boston Red Sox
- Bobby Hansen, NBA player, played for Dowling Catholic High School in West Des Moines, and University of Iowa
- Bob Harlan, CEO of Green Bay Packers 1989-2007
- Rex Harvey, Team USA decathlete, one of the developers of tables for grading athletic performances based on sex and age
- Jeremy Hellickson, pitcher for Washington Nationals, attended Herbert Hoover High School in Des Moines
- Ducky Holmes, early 20th century baseball player
- Frank Irons, 1908 Olympic long jump gold medalist
- Kip Janvrin, Olympian, the oldest United States decathlete to ever compete in the Olympics
- Shawn Johnson, gymnast, 2007 individual all-around World Champion, 2007 national all-around champion, 2008 Olympic champion in balance beam and team, all-around and floor exercise silver medalist; Johnson and Gabby Douglas were Liang Chow's students at his gymnastics school in West Des Moines; winner of Season 8 Dancing with the Stars
- Zach Johnson, golfer, winner of 2007 Masters Tournament and 2015 The Open Championship, attended college at Drake University in Des Moines
- Lolo Jones, Olympic track-and-field and bobsled athlete
- Natasha Kaiser-Brown, sprinter, silver medal at the 1992 Summer Olympics
- Nile Kinnick, football player and 1939 Heisman Trophy recipient
- Miranda Leek, Olympic athlete in archery; competed as both individual and team
- Kevin Love, NASCAR driver
- Matt Macri, third baseman, played at Dowling Catholic High School in West Des Moines
- George Mason, Indianapolis 500 driver; as an ambulance driver, killed in action during World War I
- Kyle Orton, NFL quarterback
- Carl Pohlad, financier and former owner of Minnesota Twins
- Dick Pope, Sr., the "father of American water skiing" and promoter of Florida tourism; born in Des Moines
- Dolph Pulliam, the first African-American television broadcaster in the state of Iowa: the leader and standout player of the Drake men's basketball team in the 1969 Final Four which finished in third place
- Shawna Robinson, NASCAR driver
- Buck Shaw, offensive tackle who blocked for George Gipp on Knute Rockne's first undefeated University of Notre Dame football team, winner of two Sugar Bowls as head coach of Santa Clara University, the first football head coach at the United States Air Force Academy, the Philadelphia Eagles head coach who won 1960 NFL Championship, and the only coach to have beaten Vince Lombardi in the playoffs
- Matt Snider, NFL player
- Jeremy Stephens, featherweight mixed martial arts fighter for UFC
- Lester Stoefen, tennis player, U.S. Open doubles champion
- Kevin Tapani, Major League Baseball pitcher
- Ross Verba, NFL lineman, played for Dowling Catholic High School in West Des Moines
- Frank Wykoff, sprinter, gold medalist at 1928, 1932 and 1936 Olympics

== Authors ==
- Inez Asher, author and screenwriter
- Stephen Beachy, author
- David W. Belin, author
- Rob Borsellino, author
- Bill Bryson, author
- Paul Cain, crime novelist; also wrote screenplays as Peter Ruric; born George Caryl Sims
- Thomas M. Disch, author
- Christopher Largen, author
- Era Bell Thompson, writer and journalist
- Brian Wansink, author of Mindless Eating

== Other ==
- James Allen, commander of Fort Des Moines No. 2 (1843-1846) and organizer of the Mormon Battalion, first officer buried at Fort Leavenworth National Cemetery
- Frank Mills Andrews, architect
- Herbert W. Armstrong, religious evangelist, founder of the Worldwide Church of God
- Austin Baeth, member of the Iowa House of Representatives
- Sean Bagniewski, member of the Iowa House of Representatives
- George Ball, diplomat
- Joseph Stillman Blake, architect
- Martin Bucksbaum, financier and shopping center developer, brother of Maurice and Matthew
- Coker F. Clarkson, Iowa senator and agricultural journalist
- Coker Fifield Clarkson, general manager of the Society of Automotive Engineers
- Grosvenor Clarkson, director of the Council of National Defense
- Edwin H. Conger, U.S. ambassador to China during the Boxer Rebellion, U.S. ambassador to Brazil, and U.S. ambassador to Mexico
- Frances L. Dawson, Illinois state representative and educator
- Scott DesJarlais, U.S. representative for Tennessee
- Lawrence Russell Dewey, U.S. Army general
- Andreas Dombret, board member German central bank Deutsche Bundesbank civil rights activist
- Johnny Gosch, a missing boy
- Tyler Howe, mayor
- Mike Hammond, along with Ted Waitt are billionaires and co-founders of Gateway Computers
- Ashley Hinson, U.S. representative for Iowa
- Herman Hollis, one of three FBI special agents who shot John Dillinger outside the Biograph Theater on July 22, 1934, resulting in Dillinger's death; the other special agents were Charles B. Winstead and Clarence O. Hurt
- Pauline Brown Humphrey, cosmetologist
- Libbie Henrietta Hyman (1888–1969), zoologist
- Jim Inhofe, former U.S. senator serving Oklahoma
- George Kinley, businessman and Iowa state legislator
- Stephen Kline, artist, photographer
- Laurence W. Lane Jr., magazine publisher and diplomat
- The McCaughey septuplets, born in 1997 in Des Moines to parents from nearby Carlisle, and the world's first set of septuplets to all survive infancy
- Clark R. Rasmussen, member of the Iowa House of Representatives
- James Redfield, railroad engineer and surveyor for the Union Armies of Ulysses S. Grant and William Tecumseh Sherman
- Ben Silbermann, co-founder and CEO of Pinterest
- Kenneth Sonderleiter, bootlegger and businessman
- S.S. Still, graduate of Drake University Law School and founder of what is currently the Des Moines University
- John E. Tapscott, businessman and Iowa state legislator
- William Tubby, architect
- Henry A. Wallace, 33rd vice president of the United States (1941–45), secretary of agriculture (1933–40), and secretary of commerce (1945–46)
- Henry Cantwell Wallace, editor of Wallaces' Farmer (1916–21) and secretary of agriculture (1921–24)
- George W. Webber, president of New York Theological Seminary
- Larry Zox, abstract expressionist, color field painter, and lyrical abstractionist, Roosevelt High graduate, studied at Des Moines Art Center

== Bands ==
- Country singers Kate and Kacey Coppola were born in Des Moines, and appeared on CMT's Can You Duet.
- Alternative rock band Dirty Little Rabbits was formed by Shawn Crahan of Slipknot. Percussionist Michael Pfaff would eventually join Slipknot as well.
- Faculty Lounge, band made up of former and current Des Moines-area educators, coaches, and/or administrators, is based in Des Moines.
- The Nadas, band that Playboy magazine called the "Best College Band You've Never Heard Of", is based in Des Moines.
- Jim Roth, guitarist with rock band Built to Spill, is from West Des Moines.
- Seven of the nine debut lineup members of the band Slipknot were born in Des Moines. Paul Gray was born in Los Angeles and James Root was born in Las Vegas.
  - Corey Taylor, rock/metal musician, vocalist; also with Stone Sour
  - Sid Wilson, DJ aka DJ Starscream
  - Joey Jordison, drummer
  - Chris Fehn, percussionist, backup vocals
  - Craig Jones, keyboardist/sampler
  - Shawn "Clown" Crahan, percussionist, backup vocals
  - Mick Thomson, guitarist
- The metal band Stone Sour began their music career in Des Moines. Both Slipknot and Stone Sour feature vocalist Corey Taylor.

== See also ==
- List of musicians from Des Moines
