= List of musicians from Des Moines =

Musicians from Des Moines, Iowa

There have been multiple musicians from Des Moines, Iowa, mainly rock bands and jazz musicians. The most popular being the Heavy Metal band, Slipknot, with most its members being born in Des Moines. Des Moines has a lot of local venues, independent radio stations, and community events that help expand music in the surrounding areas. Local festivals such as the Hinterland Music Festival and 80/35 Music Festival attract many visitors. Many musicians from the area credit Des Moines in shaping their careers.

The combined events venue of Casey's Center, EMC Expo Center, and the Community Choice Credit Union Veterans Auditorium ballroom has hosted 346 events so far, as of 2025, and has made a profit of $1.84 million.

== Bands ==
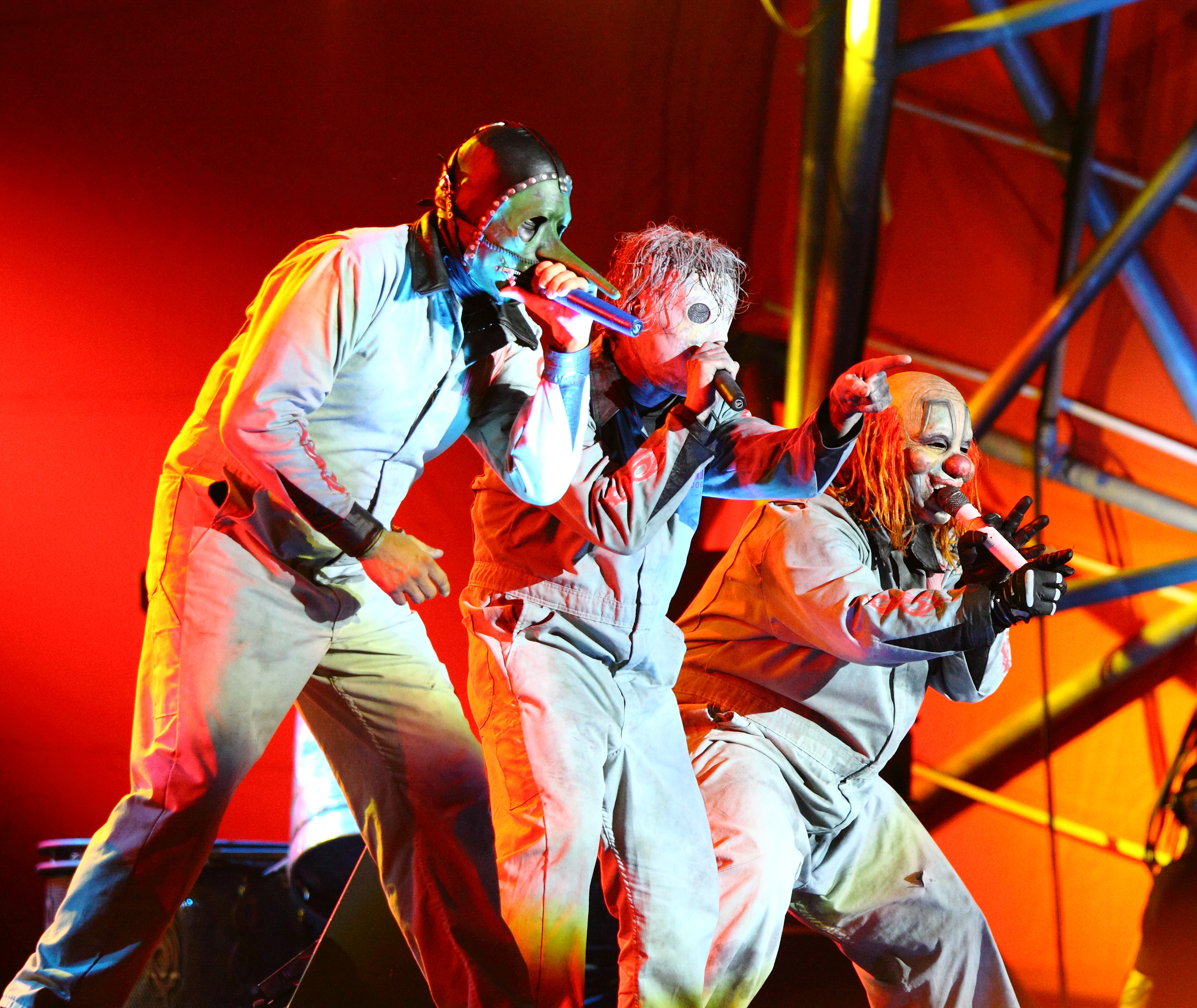
Des Moines-based group Slipknot performing at Roskilde Festival in 2013

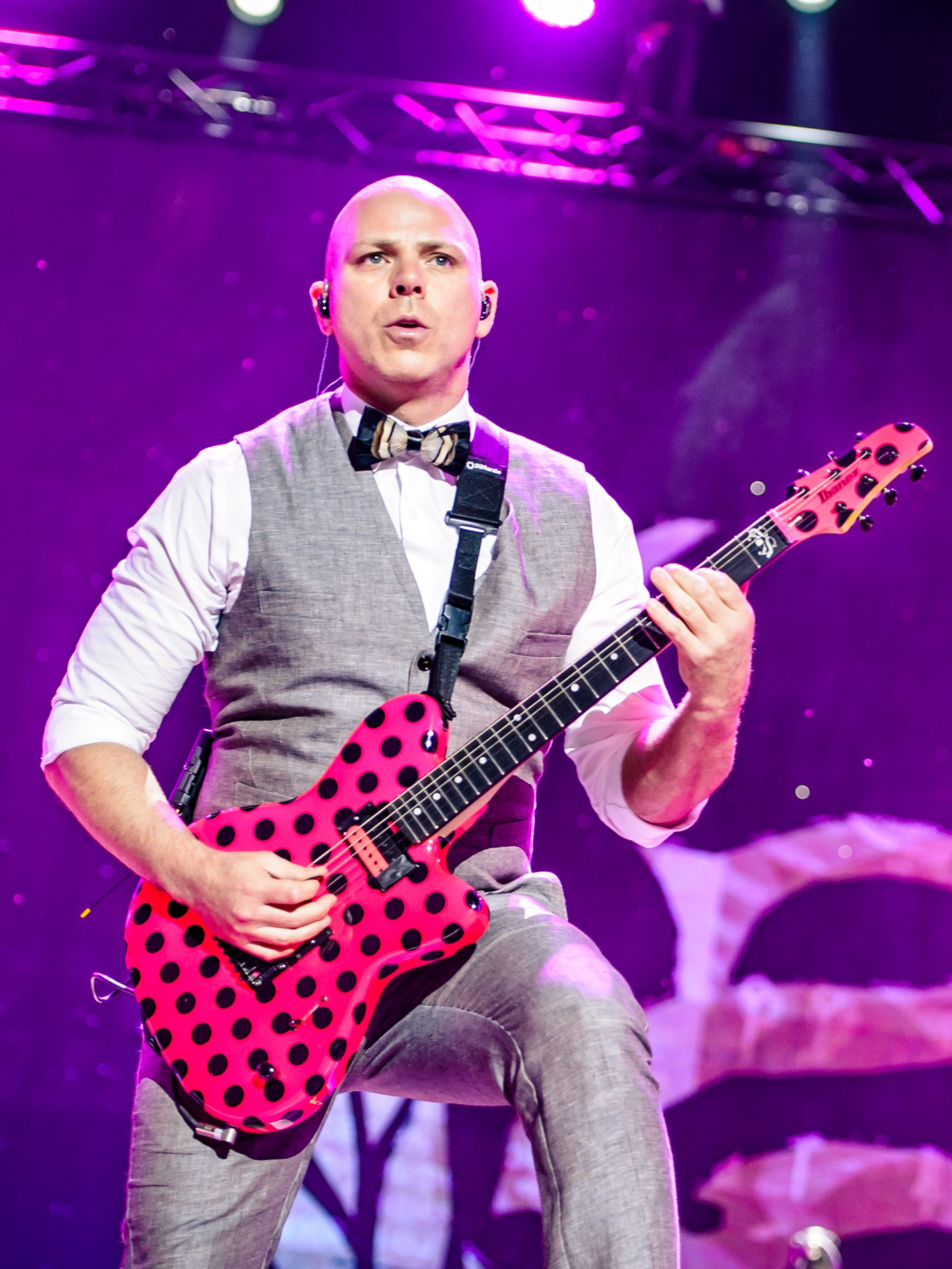
Josh Rand from Stone Sour performing in Nürnberg Rock Park

Slipknot is the most popular music group from Iowa, with 14.7 million monthly listeners on Spotify. 10 members from the group were born in Des Moines, the oldest being Donnie Steele, born on December 31, 1967 (age 58), and the youngest being Michael Pfaff, born on May 17, 1980 (age 46). The group's album Iowa has reached platinum status in Canada, the United Kingdom, and the United States.

Slipknot members
Name	Born	Years active	Reference
Donnie Steele	December 31, 1967 (age 58)	1993–1996, 2011–2014	
Shawn Crahan	September 24, 1969 (age 56)	1992–present	
Craig Jones	February 11, 1972 (age 54)	1992–2023	
Anders Colsefni	April 15, 1972 (age 54)	1988–2003, 2005–2015, 2020–present	
Chris Fehn	February 24, 1973 (age 53	1998–2019	
Mick Thomson	November 3, 1973 (age 52)	1992–present	
Corey Taylor	December 8, 1973 (age 52)	1992–present	
Joey Jordison	April 26, 1975 (died July 26, 2021, aged 46)	1990–2018	
Sid Wilson	January 20, 1977 (age 49)	1992–present	
Michael Pfaff	May 17, 1980 (age 46)	2007–present	

Other band members
Name (band/group)	Born	Years active	Reference
Josh Rand (Stone Sour)	August 19, 1974 (age 52)	1993, 2000–present	
Brenton Dean (Holy White Hounds)		2005–present	
Ambrose Lupercal (Holy White Hounds)		2005–present	
James Manson (Holy White Hounds)		2005–present	
Seth Luloff (Holy White Hounds)		2015–2018	
Mike Butterworth (The Nadas)		1995–present	
Jason Walsmith (The Nadas)		1995–present	

== Solo artists ==
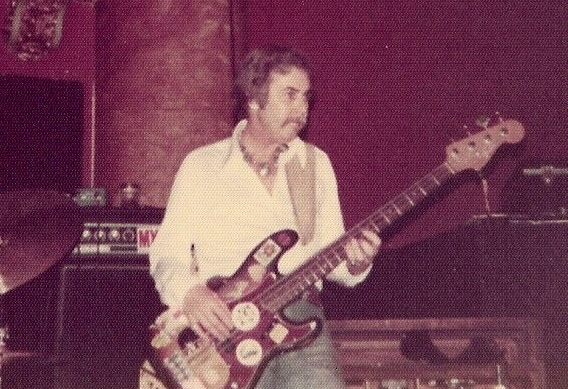
Max Bennett in 1976

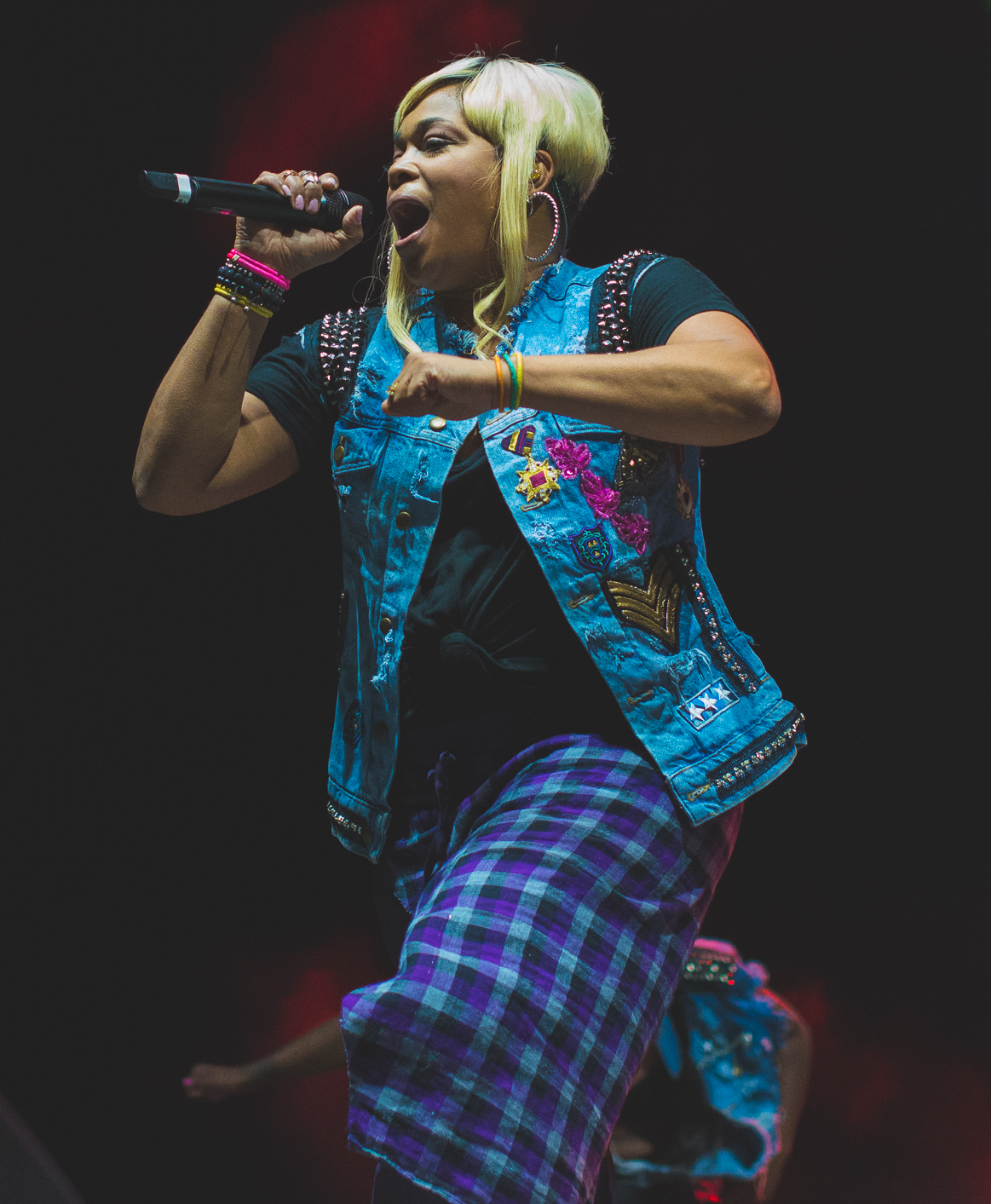
Tionne Watkins performing in 2016

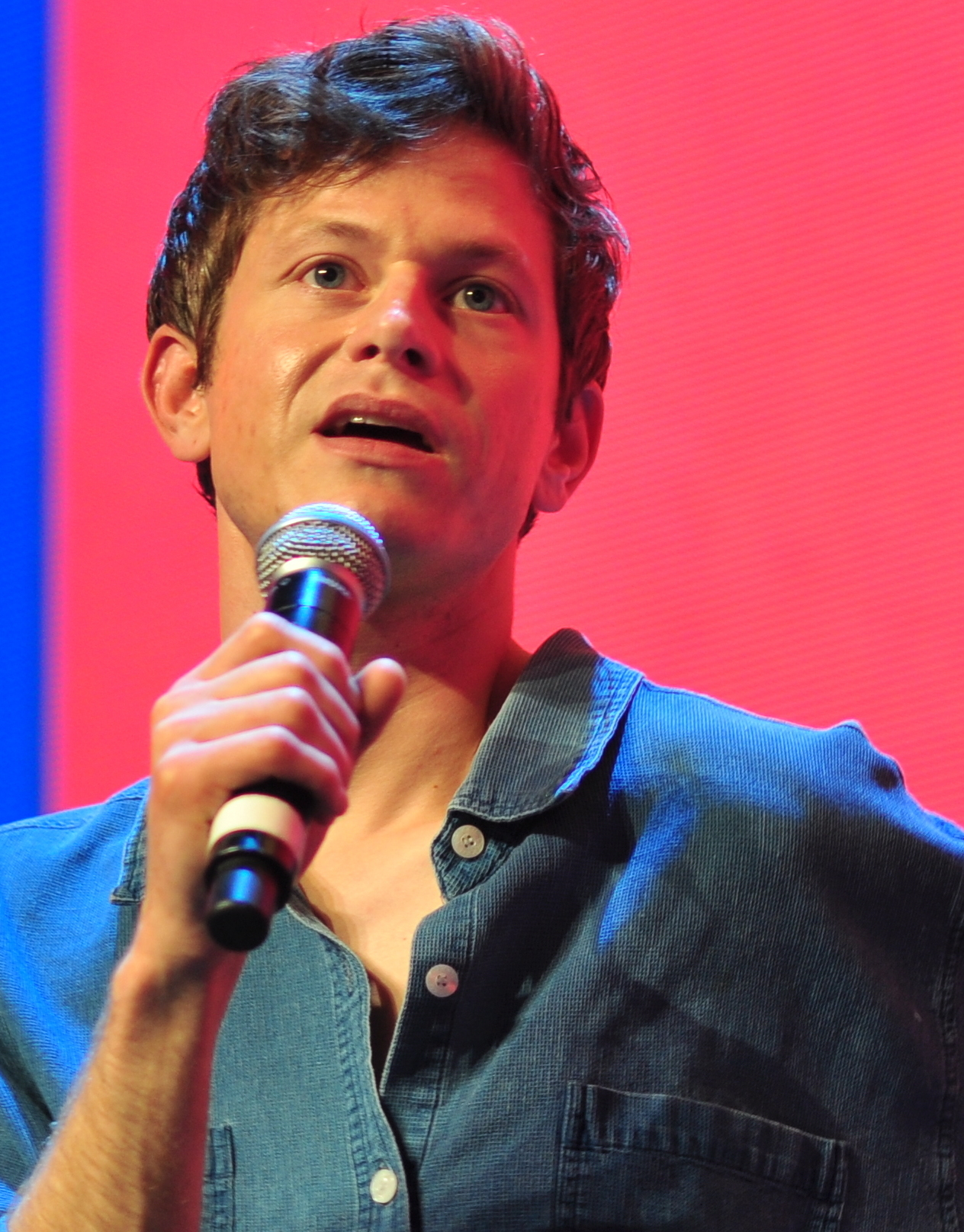
Perfume Genius at a pop conference in 2017

The majority of solo artists from Des Moines are jazz musicians. Early 20th-century traveling artists travelled to the plains, into cities like Kansas City, Chicago, and Des Moines. As jazz grew in the United States, so did the midwestern venues, including Des Moines, which helped grow its popularity in the region. Des Moines was a major stop for jazz musicians to perform in, and included a theatre from Balaban and Katz. Many famous jazz bands and musicians came to clubs throughout the city, including Charlie Parker and Thad Jones.

Name	Born	Genre(s)	Reference
Samuel Siegel	1875 (died January 14, 1948, aged 73)	Mandolin	
John Rox	July 21, 1902 (died August 5, 1957, aged 55)	Composer	
Dwight L. Armstrong	September 15, 1904 (died November 17, 1984, aged 80)	Hymnal	
George Roberts	March 22, 1928 (died September 28, 2014, aged 86)	Jazz	
Max Bennett	May 24, 1928 (died September 14, 2018, aged 90)	Jazz	
Lanny Morgan	March 30, 1934 (age 92)	Jazz	
Ellyn Rucker	July 29, 1937 (died 2022, aged 84)	Jazz	
Patty Larkin	June 19, 1951 (age 75)	Folk rock	
Dick Oatts	April 2, 1953 (age 73)	Jazz	
Bruce Brubaker	February 1, 1959 (age 67)	Classical	
Bill Stewart	October 18, 1966 (age 59)	Jazz	
Tionne Watkins	April 26, 1970 (age 56)	R&B, hip hop, pop, soul	
Stuart Davis	January 11, 1971 (age 55)	Alternative	
Farrah Franklin	May 3, 1981 (age 45)	R&B	
Perfume Genius (Michael Alden Hadreas)	September 25, 1981 (age 44)	Art pop, indie rock, baroque pop, indie pop, chamber pop, folk, modern classical	
Sarah Darling	October 4, 1982 (age 43)	Country	
Young Fyre (Tramaine Winfrey)	March 9, 1986 (age 40)	Hip hop, R&B, pop, alternative hip hop	
Max Jury	May 12, 1992 (age 34)	Alternative	
