= Walking Home Alone =

"Walking Home Alone" may refer to:

- "Walkin' Home Alone", by Stan Ridgway from The Big Heat (album) 1986
- "Walking Home Alone", song by The Nadas from New Start (The Nadas album) and Show to Go
- "Walking Home Alone Again", 1978 single by The Radiators from Space from Ghostown (The Radiators album)
