= Authentic Records =

American independent record label

Authentic Records is an independent record label based in Des Moines, Iowa. It was created by the band The Nadas and has signed a number of rock artists, particularly in the Midwest.

The label currently distributes music from The Nadas, Jon Peter Lewis, Josh Davis Band, Towncrier, Benjamin Wagner, Stephanie Walsmith, Bob Hillman, Jerry Chapman, and Jason LeVasseur and Hichamodinamo and Manager Niels and Killer Edy and Sem R and Rich-art.

== See also ==
- List of record labels
