= Michael Annett =

American racing driver (1986–2025)

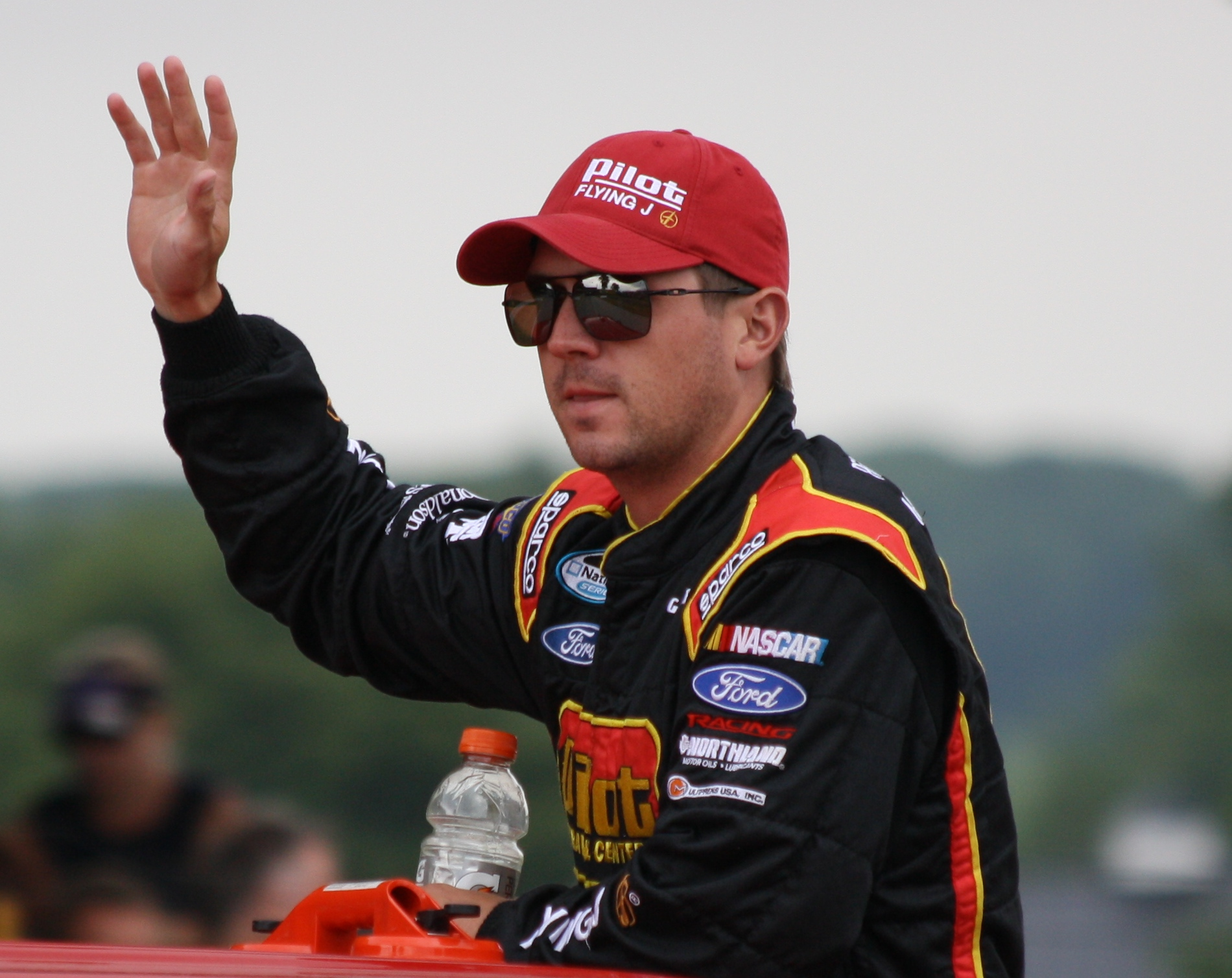
- Annett in 2012
- Born: Michael Wayne Annett; June 23, 1986; Des Moines, Iowa, U.S.
- Died: December 2, 2025 (aged 39)
- Height: 5 ft 10 in (1.78 m)
- Weight: 180 lb (82 kg)

NASCAR Cup Series career
- 106 races run over 3 years
- 2016 position: 36th
- Best finish: 33rd (2014)
- First race: 2014 Daytona 500 (Daytona)
- Last race: 2016 Ford EcoBoost 400 (Homestead)
Wins	Top tens	Poles
0	0	0

NASCAR O'Reilly Auto Parts Series career
- 321 races run over 11 years
- 2021 position: 15th
- Best finish: 5th (2012)
- First race: 2008 Ford 300 (Homestead)
- Last race: 2021 NASCAR Xfinity Series Championship Race (Phoenix)
- First win: 2019 NASCAR Racing Experience 300 (Daytona)
Wins	Top tens	Poles
1	95	1

NASCAR FedEx Freight Truck Series career
- 9 races run over 2 years
- 2014 position: 87th
- Best finish: 30th (2008)
- First race: 2008 Camping World RV Sales 200 (Milwaukee)
- Last race: 2014 Mudsummer Classic (Eldora)
Wins	Top tens	Poles
0	2	0

ARCA Menards Series career
- 10 races run over 3 years
- Best finish: 35th (2008)
- First race: 2007 Prairie Meadows 250 (Iowa)
- Last race: 2009 Lucas Oil Slick Mist 200 (Daytona)
- First win: 2007 ARCA Re/Max 250 (Talladega)
- Last win: 2008 Daytona ARCA 200 (Daytona)
Wins	Top tens	Poles
2	8	1

ARCA Menards Series West career
- 1 race run over 1 year
- Best finish: 54th (2014)
- First race: 2014 Carneros 200 (Sonoma)
Wins	Top tens	Poles
0	1	0
- Statistics up to date as of December 5, 2025.

Michael Wayne Annett (June 23, 1986 – December 2, 2025) was an American professional stock car racing driver. He last competed in the NASCAR Xfinity Series, driving the No. 1 Chevrolet Camaro SS for JR Motorsports.

== Racing career ==
=== Early career ===
Save for a few mini-cup races during elementary school, Annett started racing after high school, starting at Hawkeye Downs in Iowa. He then advanced to the American Speed Association series. Annett had two career victories in the ARCA Menards Series. His first win came in the ARCA Re/Max 250 at Talladega Superspeedway on October 5, 2007, and his second win came in the Daytona ARCA 200 at Daytona International Speedway on February 9, 2008.

=== NASCAR ===
==== Camping World Truck Series ====
Along with a part-time ARCA schedule, Annett competed in a handful of NASCAR Craftsman Truck Series events in 2008. He made his debut on June 20 at The Milwaukee Mile, and scored a best finish of second at Kentucky Speedway.

Annett returned to the series on two occasions in 2014 and 2021, both at dirt tracks: the former came with NTS Motorsports at Eldora Speedway, while the latter was at Knoxville Raceway for Young's Motorsports. However, he was replaced by Chris Windom at the latter after practice due to a leg injury.

==== Xfinity Series ====
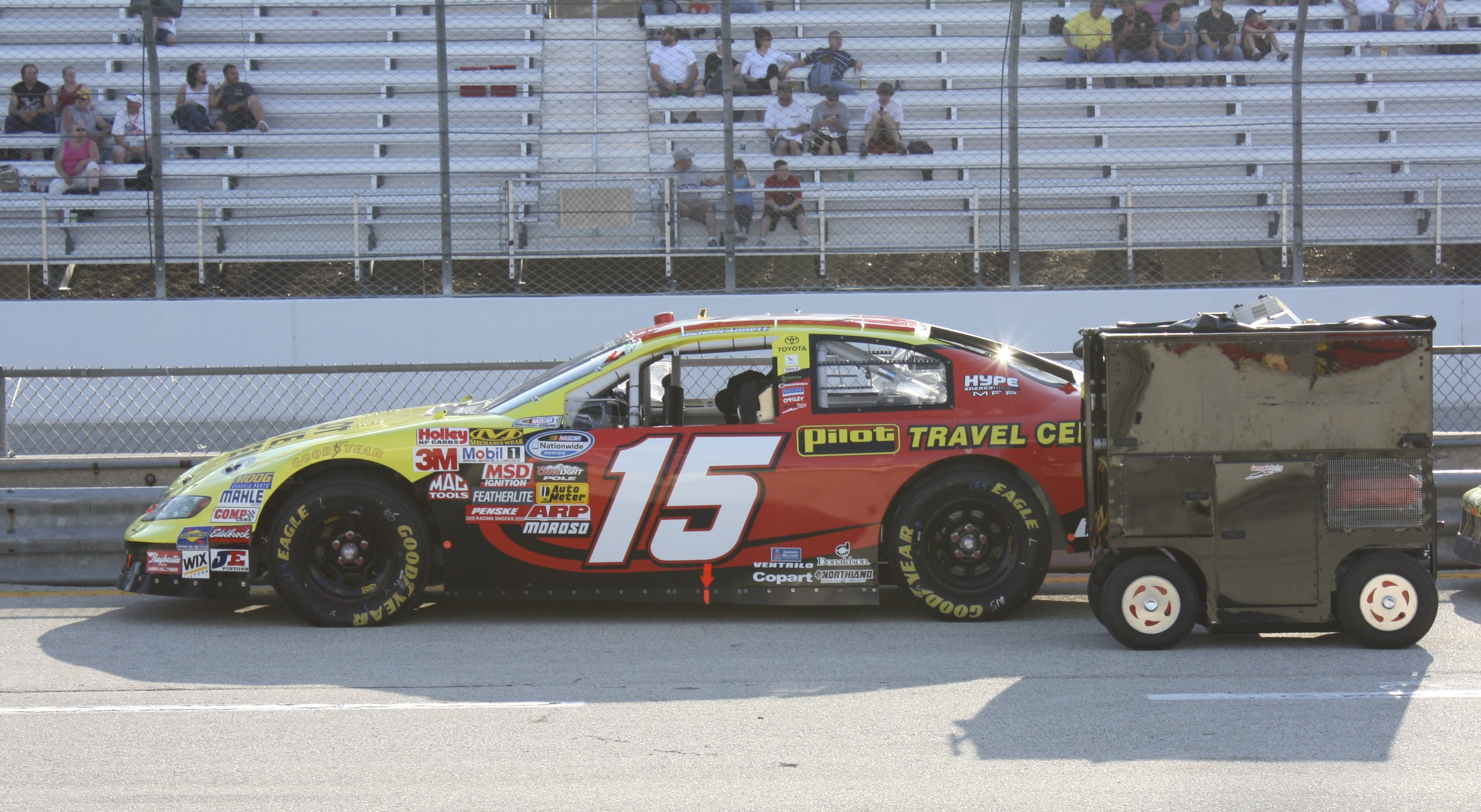
Annett's 2009 Nationwide car at the Milwaukee Mile

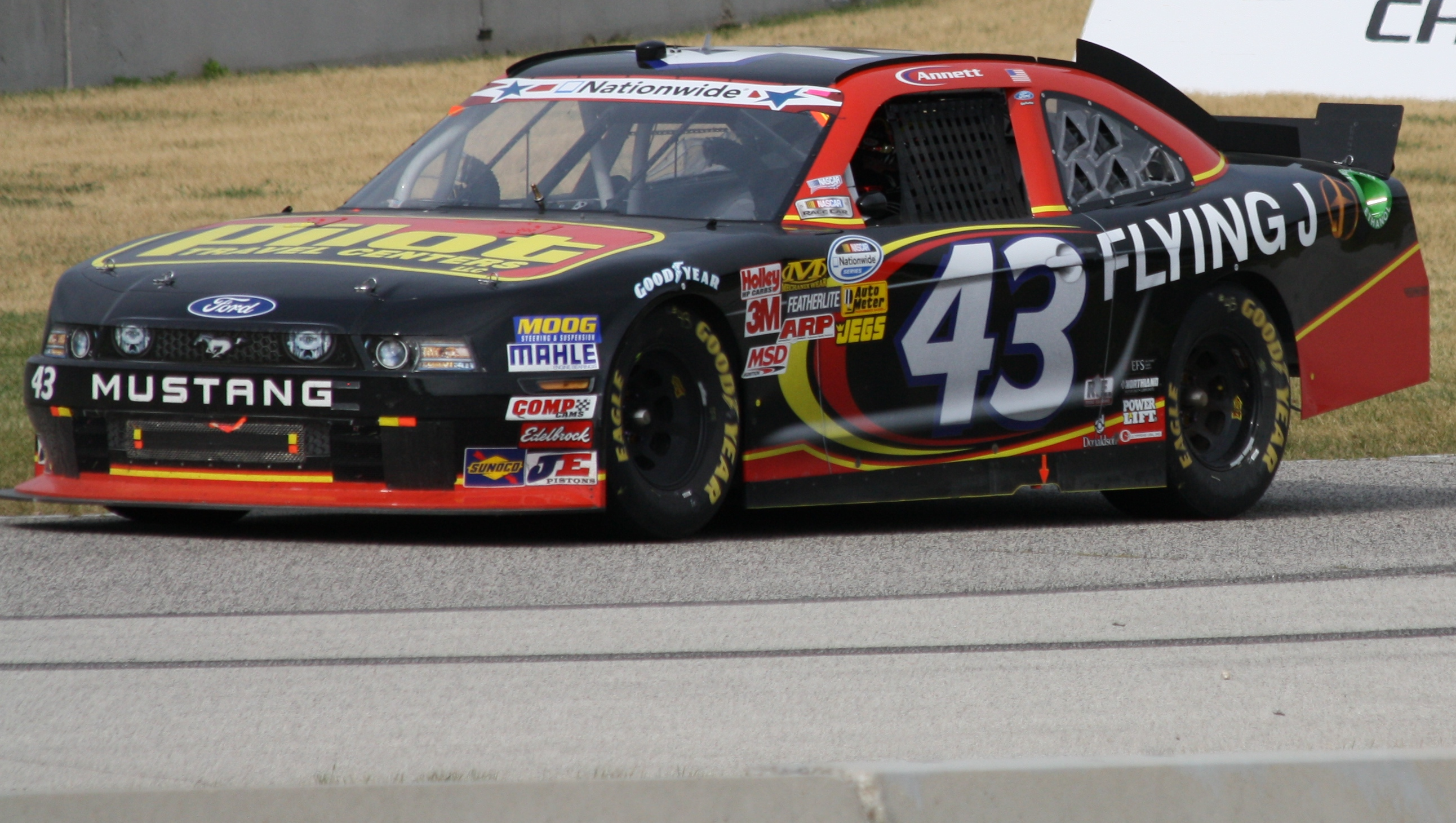
Annett's 2012 Nationwide car at Road America

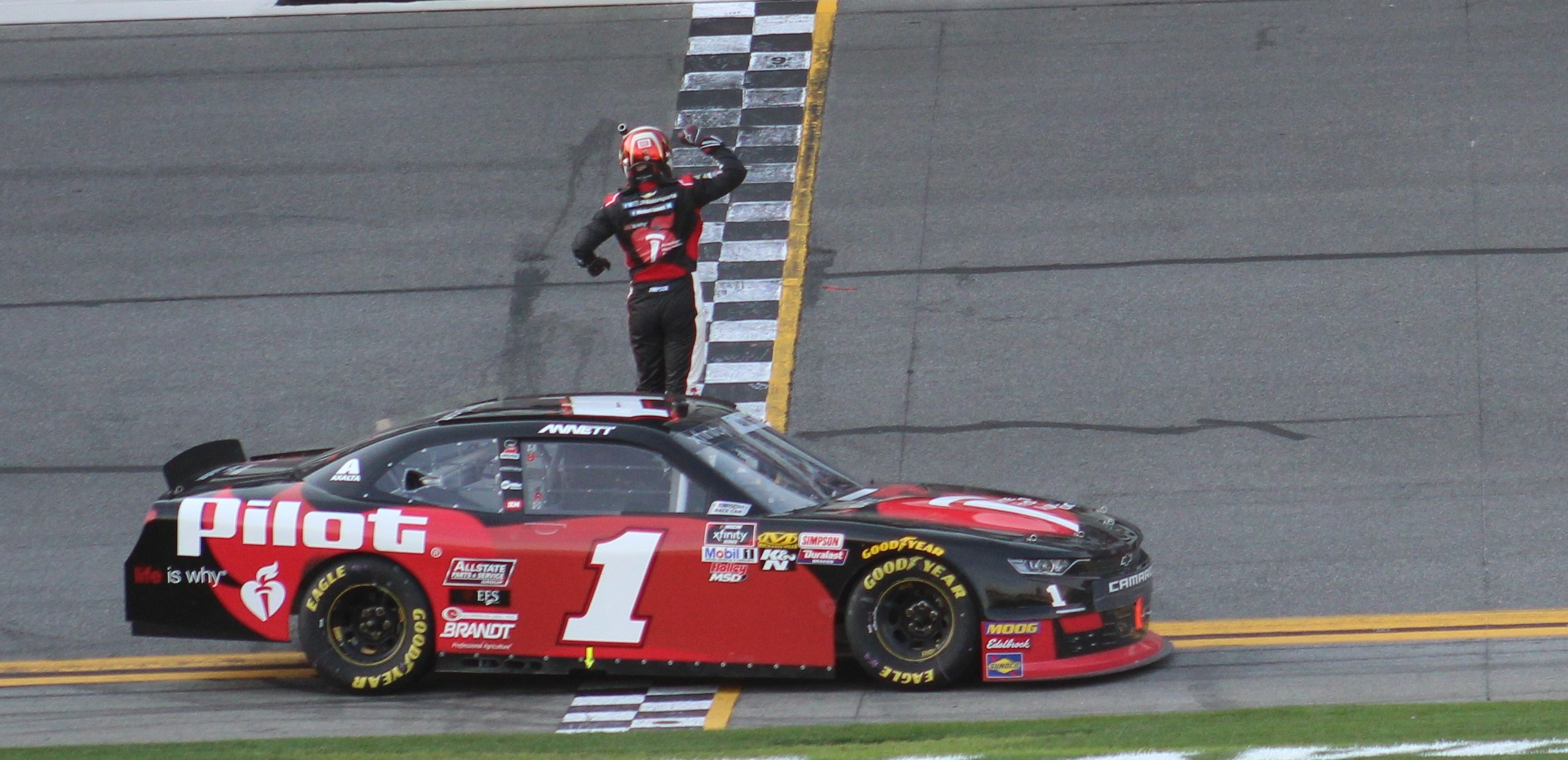
Annett celebrating after winning the 2019 NASCAR Racing Experience 300

Towards the end of 2008, Annett signed with Germain Racing to drive for the team in NASCAR's Nationwide Series. Annett made his debut in the final race of the 2008 season at the Homestead-Miami Speedway, where he crashed out and finished 36th.

For 2009, Annett ran for Rookie of the Year honors in the No. 15 Toyota Camry, with sponsorships from Pilot Travel Centers and HYPE Energy. He scored four top-tens en route to a tenth-place finish in points, but finished second to Justin Allgaier. Annett returned to Germain in 2010, but found less success than in 2009. He accumulated just two top-tens (at Nashville and Iowa) and only led seven laps, finishing thirteenth in the overall points standings.

Annett left Germain for Rusty Wallace Racing in 2011, driving the team's No. 62 Toyota Camry with Pilot Travel Centers (now Pilot Flying J) sponsoring. He achieved seven top-ten finishes, placing him ninth overall in the final points standings. After the shutdown of RWR, Annett moved to Richard Petty Motorsports in the 2012 NASCAR Nationwide Series season. He earned six top-fives and seventeen top-tens, finishing fifth in points.

The following season, Annett missed eight races due to a hard crash he suffered in the season-opening DRIVE4COPD 300 at Daytona International Speedway, suffering what was initially reported as a bruised sternum. Further evaluation showed that Annett had dislocated and fractured his sternum, requiring surgery; Aric Almirola replaced Annett in the No. 43 for the Dollar General 200 at Phoenix International Raceway, with Reed Sorenson subbing after that. Annett returned in Charlotte in May, and recorded one top-five and four top-tens, finishing fifteenth in the points standings.

On November 4, 2016, Annett announced he would be returning to the Nationwide Series – now known as the O'Reilly Auto Parts Series – in 2017, driving the No. 5 Chevrolet Camaro for JR Motorsports on a full-time basis.

In his first full-time season with JRM, Annett scored one top-five and seven top-tens. His best finish was second at Road America. He finished the season ninth in points. Then in 2018, Annett had a dismal season, scoring only three Top 10 finishes with the best result being a seventh-place finish at Bristol. This led to a fourteenth-place finish in points. On January 25, 2019, it was announced that Annett would be driving the No. 1 Chevrolet, with the points from the No. 5 car going over to the No. 1 car.

On February 16, 2019, Annett scored his first and only career victory at Daytona International Speedway in the NASCAR Racing Experience 300. After a beginning to 2019 that was markedly better than 2018, Annett credited crew chief Travis Mack, who joined the team in late summer-2018, as a catalyst for the success.

Annett returned to JRM in 2020 and qualified for the playoffs. He was eliminated after the first round.

In July 2021, Annett missed the races at Atlanta and New Hampshire due to a stress fracture in his right femur. Austin Dillon served as his replacement in the No. 1 for Atlanta, while Josh Berry did so for New Hampshire. Later on in the season, after the race at Watkins Glen, Chase Elliott would be the replacement for him at the Indianapolis Road Course. Josh Berry would also serve as his replacement at Michigan. After running three more races after Michigan, Annett would end up reinjuring his right femur. Annett would miss three more races, which were at Bristol, Las Vegas, and Talladega. Berry would end up replacing him in those three races. On October 6 of that year, Annett announced he would retire from full-time competition at the end of the 2021 season.

==== Sprint Cup Series ====
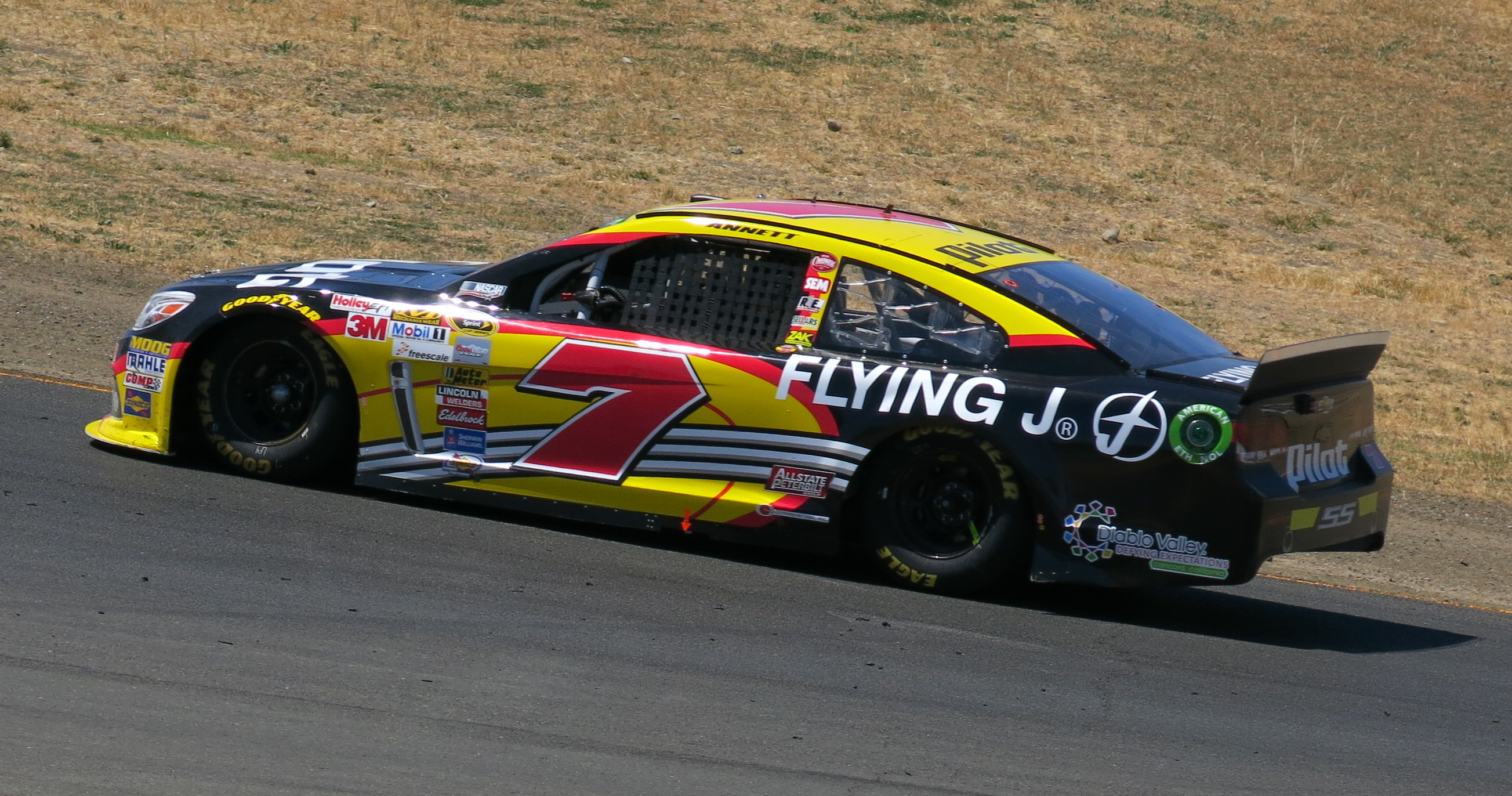
Annett 2014 Cup Series car at Sonoma Raceway

In November 2013, it was announced that Annett would be moving up to the NASCAR Sprint Cup Series for the 2014 season, driving for Tommy Baldwin Racing in the No. 7 Chevrolet. It was a rough rookie season however and he had only four top-twenty finishes en route to a 33rd-place points finish that year. Annett was replaced after the season by Alex Bowman.

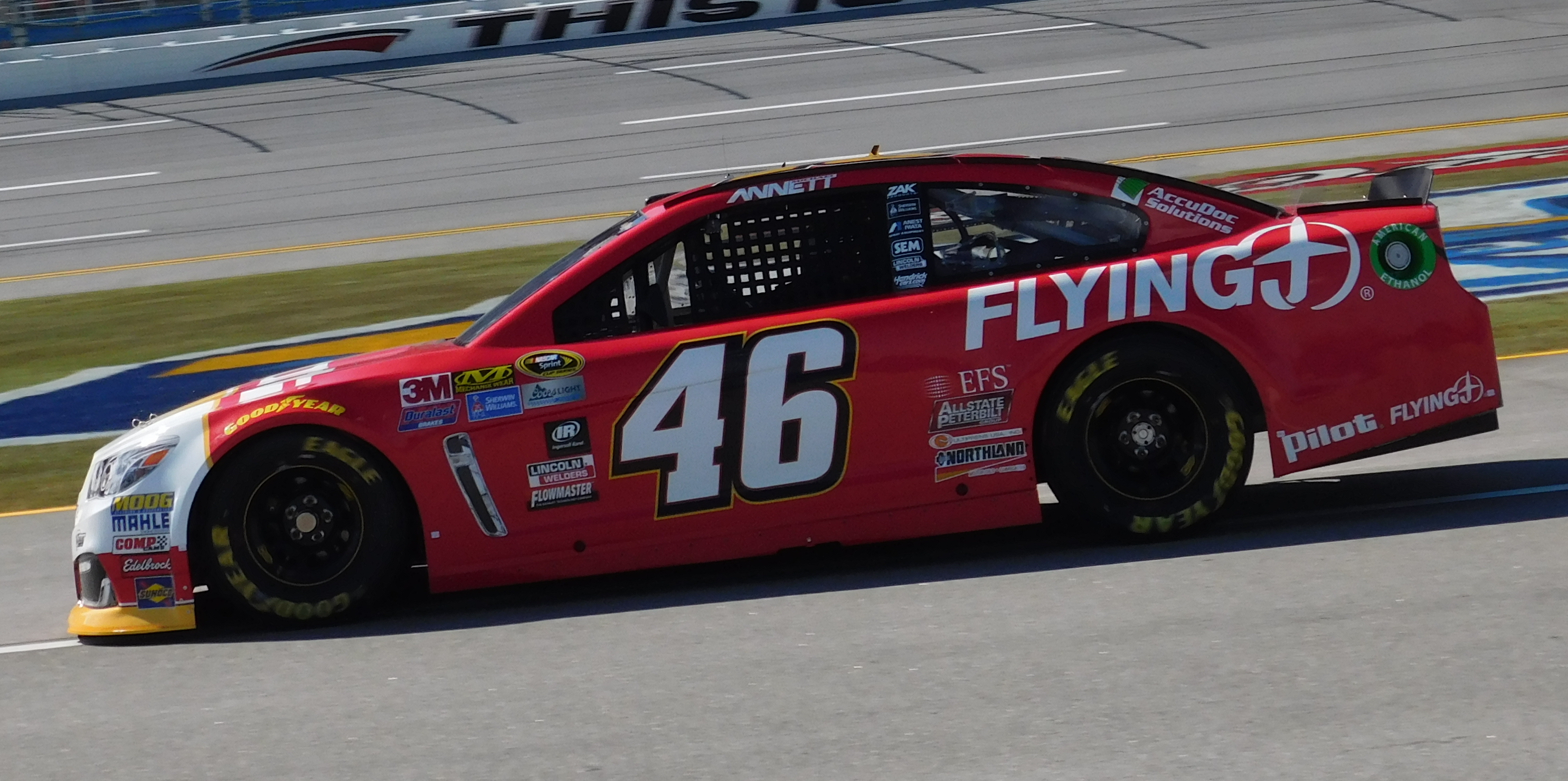
Annett's 2016 Cup Series car at Talladega Superspeedway

Annett announced on January 27 that he was switching teams and would be driving for HScott Motorsports, thus bringing HScott to a two-car team. He began the year by racing his way into the Daytona 500, finishing a career-best thirteenth. Annett failed to qualify for the race at Atlanta thanks to controversy during qualifying, but Richard Childress Racing development driver Brian Scott gave Annett his spot in the race because Scott was running for Xfinity Series points while Annett was running for Cup Series points. The No. 33 was the same RCR car that Scott was supposed to drive, but used all HScott Motorsports personnel and ran under the Hillman-Circle Sport LLC banner.

Annett later failed to qualify again at Talladega in October. This time, no one gave up their seat for Annett, and he did not race. At the end of the 2015 season, Annett's average finish was worse with HScott Motorsports than it was with Baldwin despite running in a stable team.

Annett returned to the team in 2016, joined by new teammate Clint Bowyer. Prior to the Bass Pro Shops NRA Night Race, Annett was replaced by former teammate Justin Allgaier in the No. 46 as he had been suffering from flu-like symptoms. On November 1, Annett announced that he would not return to HScott Motorsports in 2017.

== Personal life and death ==
Annett was born in Des Moines, Iowa on June 23, 1986. His late father, Harrold, was the CEO of TMC Transportation, which sponsored Michael's racing efforts. Annett played as defenseman for the Waterloo Black Hawks of the United States Hockey League prior to starting his racing career. In 2004, he was a member of the team that won Clark Cup, and he was named "Most Improved Player" on a team that included future NHL player Joe Pavelski. His father used to own a dirt track team which fielded drivers including Sammy Swindell, before selling up prior to him starting his hockey career. At 5 ft 10 in (1.78 m), and 180 lb (82 kg), he was considered too small to play at a higher level.

=== Legal issues ===
On February 6, 2011, Annett was involved in a traffic accident where he rear-ended a car in Mooresville, North Carolina, which was stopped at a red light. According to police reports, Annett had a registered BAC of 0.32 (four times the legal limit in North Carolina). Annett subsequently resisted arrest as he did not want to be handcuffed. He also claimed that he had been texting, and thus could not stop in time to avoid an accident; a similar incident involving Annett occurred in 2010. Rusty Wallace Racing said that they did not condone the incident and that Annett would be facing internal sanctions. NASCAR kept in contact with the local authorities as well as RWR. Annett issued a formal apology and did not miss any races.

=== Death ===
Annett died on December 2, 2025 and his death was announced by JR Motorsports and NASCAR on December 5. The cause of his death was not made public. He was 39 years old.

== Motorsports career results ==
=== Stock car career summary ===
Season	Series	Team	Races	Wins	Top 5	Top 10	Points	Position
2007	ARCA Re/Max Series	Win-Tron Racing	3	0	1	3	880	38th
2007	ARCA Re/Max Series	Bill Davis Racing	1	1	1	1	880	38th
2008	ARCA Re/Max Series	Bill Davis Racing	5	1	3	4	925	35th
2008	NASCAR Craftsman Truck Series	Bill Davis Racing	7	0	1	2	910	30th
2008	NASCAR Craftsman Truck Series	Germain Racing	1	0	0	0	910	30th
2008	NASCAR Nationwide Series	Germain Racing	1	0	0	0	55	138th
2009	ARCA Re/Max Series	Hattori Racing Enterprises	1	0	0	0	30	155th
2009	NASCAR Nationwide Series	Germain Racing	35	0	0	4	3598	10th
2010	NASCAR Nationwide Series	Germain Racing	35	0	0	2	3651	13th
2011	NASCAR Nationwide Series	Rusty Wallace Racing	34	0	0	7	944	9th
2012	NASCAR Nationwide Series	Richard Petty Motorsports	33	0	6	17	1082	5th
2013	NASCAR Nationwide Series	Richard Petty Motorsports	25	0	1	4	696	15th
2014	NASCAR Camping World Truck Series	NTS Motorsports	1	0	0	0	0	NC
2014	NASCAR K&N Pro Series West	Portenga Motorsports	1	0	0	1	38	54th
2014	NASCAR Sprint Cup Series	Tommy Baldwin Racing	36	0	0	0	531	33rd
2015	NASCAR Sprint Cup Series	HScott Motorsports	34	0	0	0	398	36th
2015	NASCAR Sprint Cup Series	Hillman-Circle Sport LLC	1	0	0	0	398	36th
2016	NASCAR Sprint Cup Series	HScott Motorsports	35	0	0	0	328	36th
2017	NASCAR Xfinity Series	JR Motorsports	33	0	1	7	2155	9th
2018	NASCAR Xfinity Series	JR Motorsports	33	0	0	3	632	14th
2019	NASCAR Xfinity Series	JR Motorsports	33	1	6	19	2239	9th
2020	NASCAR Xfinity Series	JR Motorsports	33	0	4	22	2202	9th
2021	NASCAR Xfinity Series	JR Motorsports	26	0	1	10	638	15th

=== NASCAR ===
(key) (Bold – Pole position awarded by qualifying time. Italics – Pole position earned by points standings or practice time. * – Most laps led.)

==== Cup Series ====
NASCAR Cup Series results
Year	Team	No.	Make	1	2	3	4	5	6	7	8	9	10	11	12	13	14	15	16	17	18	19	20	21	22	23	24	25	26	27	28	29	30	31	32	33	34	35	36	NCS	Pts	Ref
2014	Tommy Baldwin Racing	7	Chevy	DAY; 37	PHO; 34	LVS; 29	BRI; 26	CAL; 19	MAR; 31	TEX; 29	DAR; 42	RCH; 33	TAL; 16	KAN; 25	CLT; 28	DOV; 35	POC; 20	MCH; 21	SON; 30	KEN; 18	DAY; 21	NHA; 32	IND; 31	POC; 22	GLN; 31	MCH; 40	BRI; 38	ATL; 21	RCH; 37	CHI; 40	NHA; 29	DOV; 41	KAN; 24	CLT; 33	TAL; 37	MAR; 24	TEX; 22	PHO; 26	HOM; 36	33rd	531	
2015	HScott Motorsports	46	Chevy	DAY; 13	ATL; DNQ	LVS; 39	PHO; 42	CAL; 38	MAR; 39	TEX; 40	BRI; 23	RCH; 33	TAL; 29	KAN; 23	CLT; 32	DOV; 41	POC; 34	MCH; 30	SON; 33	DAY; 37	KEN; 30	NHA; 36	IND; 30	POC; 26	GLN; 31	MCH; 35	BRI; 43	DAR; 39	RCH; 43	CHI; 34	NHA; 29	DOV; 37	CLT; 25	KAN; 34	TAL; DNQ	MAR; 23	TEX; 31	PHO; 32	HOM; 30	36th	398	
2015	Hillman-Circle Sport LLC	33	Chevy		ATL; 29																																			36th	398	
2016	HScott Motorsports	46	Chevy	DAY; 27	ATL; 30	LVS; 30	PHO; 33	CAL; 29	MAR; 35	TEX; 32	BRI; 31	RCH; 36	TAL; 38	KAN; 32	DOV; 37	CLT; 36	POC; 38	MCH; 28	SON; 36	DAY; 20	KEN; 26	NHA; 38	IND; 28	POC; 29	GLN; 37	BRI; QL^{†}	MCH; 33	DAR; 28	RCH; 31	CHI; 33	NHA; 40	DOV; 33	CLT; 24	KAN; 32	TAL; 33	MAR; 35	TEX; 32	PHO; 26	HOM; 28	36th	328	
^{†} – Qualified but replaced by Justin Allgaier

===== Daytona 500 =====
Year	Team	Manufacturer	Start	Finish
2014	Tommy Baldwin Racing	Chevrolet	36	37
2015	HScott Motorsports	Chevrolet	27	13
2016	HScott Motorsports	Chevrolet	21	27

==== Xfinity Series ====
NASCAR Xfinity Series results
Year	Team	No.	Make	1	2	3	4	5	6	7	8	9	10	11	12	13	14	15	16	17	18	19	20	21	22	23	24	25	26	27	28	29	30	31	32	33	34	35	NXSC	Pts	Ref
2008	Germain Racing	03	Toyota	DAY	CAL	LVS	ATL	BRI	NSH	TEX	PHO	MXC	TAL	RCH	DAR	CLT	DOV	NSH	KEN	MLW	NHA	DAY	CHI	GTY	IRP	CGV	GLN	MCH	BRI	CAL	RCH	DOV	KAN	CLT	MEM	TEX	PHO	HOM; 36	138th	55	
2009	Germain Racing	15	Toyota	DAY; 35	CAL; 16	LVS; 32	BRI; 20	TEX; 11	NSH; 19	PHO; 16	TAL; 21	RCH; 34	DAR; 29	CLT; 39	DOV; 19	NSH; 27	KEN; 7	MLW; 28	NHA; 19	DAY; 35	CHI; 17	GTY; 7	IRP; 35	IOW; 11	GLN; 20	MCH; 13	BRI; 8	CGV; 18	ATL; 14	RCH; 25	DOV; 13	KAN; 30	CAL; 6	CLT; 13	MEM; 16	TEX; 22	PHO; 20	HOM; 21	10th	3598	
2010	Germain Racing	15	Toyota	DAY; 12	CAL; 17	LVS; 33	BRI; 20	NSH; 9	PHO; 33	TEX; 16	TAL; 43	RCH; 26	DAR; 11	DOV; 15	CLT; 14	NSH; 14	KEN; 34	ROA; 24	NHA; 19	DAY; 12	CHI; 14	GTY; 11	IRP; 19	IOW; 7	GLN; 19	MCH; 16	BRI; 18	CGV; 25	ATL; 21	RCH; 20	DOV; 15	KAN; 16	CAL; 20	CLT; 36	GTY; 21	TEX; 18	PHO; 18	HOM; 24	13th	3651	
2011	Rusty Wallace Racing	62	Toyota	DAY; 39	PHO; 19	LVS; 13	BRI; 24	CAL; 18	TEX; 18	TAL; 19	NSH; 19	RCH; 16	DAR; 31	DOV; 20	IOW; 13	CLT; 14	CHI; 9	MCH; 19	ROA; 7	DAY; 6	KEN; 7	NHA; 7	NSH; 14	IRP; 29	IOW; 12	GLN; 19	CGV; 18	BRI; 6	ATL; 20	RCH; 11	CHI; 16	DOV; 12	KAN; 16	CLT; 17	TEX; 20	PHO; 10	HOM; 19		9th	944	
2012	Richard Petty Motorsports	43	Ford	DAY; 27	PHO; 10	LVS; 13	BRI; 11	CAL; 11	TEX; 9	RCH; 8	TAL; 23	DAR; 14	IOW; 14	CLT; 14	DOV; 11	MCH; 12	ROA; 26	KEN; 4	DAY; 3	NHA; 11	CHI; 5	IND; 6	IOW; 4	GLN; 11	CGV; 28	BRI; 8	ATL; 10	RCH; 5	CHI; 7	KEN; 7	DOV; 3	CLT; 10	KAN; 8	TEX; 17	PHO; 7	HOM; 12			5th	1082	
2013	Richard Petty Motorsports	43	Ford	DAY; 26	PHO	LVS	BRI	CAL	TEX	RCH	TAL	DAR	CLT; 17	DOV; 13	IOW; 30	MCH; 19	ROA; 35	KEN; 18	DAY; 15	NHA; 5	CHI; 16	IND; 9	IOW; 12	GLN; 22	MOH; 22	BRI; 11	ATL; 14	RCH; 13	CHI; 18	KEN; 10	DOV; 14	KAN; 12	CLT; 10	TEX; 14	PHO; 14	HOM; 17			15th	696	
2017	JR Motorsports	5	Chevy	DAY; 14	ATL; 15	LVS; 21	PHO; 9	CAL; 13	TEX; 20	BRI; 10	RCH; 8	TAL; 7	CLT; 36	DOV; 14	POC; 13	MCH; 37	IOW; 6	DAY; 33	KEN; 16	NHA; 16	IND; 25	IOW; 33	GLN; 16	MOH; 19	BRI; 12	ROA; 2	DAR; 17	RCH; 15	CHI; 15	KEN; 16	DOV; 11	CLT; 27	KAN; 14	TEX; 12	PHO; 16	HOM; 9			9th	2155	
2018	JR Motorsports	5	Chevy	DAY; 37	ATL; 20	LVS; 13	PHO; 17	CAL; 18	TEX; 15	BRI; 21	RCH; 20	TAL; 14	DOV; 15	CLT; 12	POC; 35	MCH; 17	IOW; 13	CHI; 30	DAY; 11	KEN; 15	NHA; 16	IOW; 14	GLN; 17	MOH; 18	BRI; 7	ROA; 12	DAR; 10	IND; 31	LVS; 40	RCH; 14	ROV; 20	DOV; 12	KAN; 40	TEX; 16	PHO; 16	HOM; 9			14th	632	
2019	JR Motorsports	1	Chevy	DAY; 1*	ATL; 12	LVS; 5	PHO; 8	CAL; 13	TEX; 6	BRI; 8	RCH; 13	**TAL**; 31	DOV; 10	CLT; 6	POC; 8	MCH; 3	IOW; 9	CHI; 3	DAY; 25	KEN; 4	NHA; 11	IOW; 10	GLN; 8	MOH; 13	BRI; 9	ROA; 12	DAR; 13	IND; 12	LVS; 13	RCH; 9	ROV; 15	DOV; 6	KAN; 4	TEX; 11	PHO; 9	HOM; 11			9th	2239	
2020	JR Motorsports	1	Chevy	DAY; 11	LVS; 7	CAL; 17	PHO; 17	DAR; 25	CLT; 7	BRI; 37	ATL; 11	HOM; 6	HOM; 18	TAL; 12	POC; 5	IRC; 9	KEN; 5	KEN; 8	TEX; 5	KAN; 8	ROA; 10	DRC; 15	DOV; 9	DOV; 8	DAY; 7	DAR; 8	RCH; 7	RCH; 7	BRI; 31	LVS; 7	TAL; 37	ROV; 9	KAN; 8	TEX; 6	MAR; 8	PHO; 4			9th	2202	
2021	JR Motorsports	1	Chevy	DAY; 36	DRC; 15	HOM; 13	LVS; 6	PHO; 38	ATL; 7	MAR; 10	TAL; 32	DAR; 7	DOV; 7	COA; 11	CLT; 24	MOH; 7	TEX; 10	NSH; 12	POC; 12	ROA; 3	ATL	NHA	GLN; 11	IRC; QL^{†}	MCH	DAY; 30	DAR; 14	RCH; 22	BRI	LVS	TAL	ROV; 27	TEX; 9	KAN; 7	MAR; 38	PHO; 11			15th	638	
^{†} – Qualified but replaced by Chase Elliott ·

==== Camping World Truck Series ====
NASCAR Camping World Truck Series results
Year	Team	No.	Make	1	2	3	4	5	6	7	8	9	10	11	12	13	14	15	16	17	18	19	20	21	22	23	24	25	NCWTC	Pts	Ref
2008	Bill Davis Racing	22	Toyota	DAY	CAL	ATL	MAR	KAN	CLT	MFD	DOV	TEX; QL^{†}	MCH	MLW; 6	MEM; 11	KEN; 2	IRP; 21	NSH; 33	BRI	GTW; 24	NHA; 24	LVS	TAL	MAR	ATL	TEX			30th	910	
2008	Germain Racing	9	Toyota																								PHO; 18	HOM	30th	910	
2014	NTS Motorsports	14	Chevy	DAY	MAR	KAN	CLT	DOV	TEX	GTW	KEN	IOW	ELD; 25	POC	MCH	BRI	MSP	CHI	NHA	LVS	TAL	MAR	TEX	PHO	HOM				102nd	0^{1}	
2021	Young's Motorsports	02	Chevy	DAY	DRC	LVS	ATL	BRD	RCH	KAN	DAR	COA	CLT	TEX	NSH	POC	KNX; QL^{‡}	GLN	GTW	DAR	BRI	LVS	TAL	MAR	PHO				N/A	0^{1}	
^{†} – Qualified for Scott Speed · ^{‡} – Qualified but replaced by Chris Windom

^{*} Season still in progress
^{1} Ineligible for series points

=== ARCA Re/Max Series ===
(key) (Bold – Pole position awarded by qualifying time. Italics – Pole position earned by points standings or practice time. * – Most laps led.)

ARCA Re/Max Series results
Year	Team	No.	Make	1	2	3	4	5	6	7	8	9	10	11	12	13	14	15	16	17	18	19	20	21	22	23	ARMC	Pts	Ref
2007	Win-Tron Racing	32	Dodge	DAY	USA	NSH	SLM	KAN	WIN	KEN	TOL	**IOW**; 3	POC	MCH	BLN	KEN	POC	NSH; 8	ISF	MIL	GTW; 6	DSF	CHI	SLM			38th	880	
2007	Bill Davis Racing	28	Toyota																						TAL; 1*	TOL	38th	880	
2008	Bill Davis Racing	28	Toyota	DAY; 1*	SLM	IOW; 28	KEN; 4	CAR; 5	KEN; 9	TOL	POC	MCH	CAY	KEN	BLN	POC	NSH	ISF	DSF	CHI	SLM	NJE	TAL	TOL			35th	925	
2009	Hattori Racing Enterprises	01	Toyota	DAY; 41	SLM	CAR	TAL	KEN	TOL	POC	MCH	MFD	IOW	KEN	BLN	POC	ISF	CHI	TOL	DSF	NJE	SLM	KAN	CAR			155th	30	

==== K&N Pro Series West ====
NASCAR K&N Pro Series West results
Year	Team	No.	Make	1	2	3	4	5	6	7	8	9	10	11	12	13	14	NKNPSWC	Pts	Ref
2014	Portenga Motorsports	31	Chevy	PHO	IRW	S99	IOW	KCR	SON; 6	SLS	CNS	IOW	EVG	KCR	MMP	AAS	PHO	54th	38	

== See also ==
- List of people from Des Moines, Iowa
