= Aliza Knox =

American columnist and non-executive director

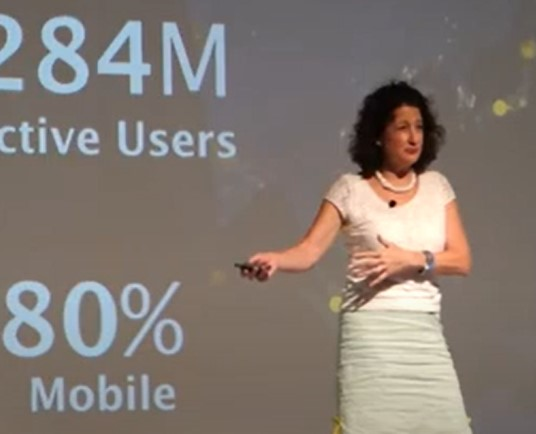
- Knox (2014)
- Born: Des Moines, Iowa
- Citizenship: American, Australian
- Education: University of Chicago Laboratory Schools; Palo Alto High School; Brown University (B.A.); New York University (M.B.A.)
- Occupations: Author; Columnist; Public speaker; Non-executive director
- Years active: 1981–present
- Employers: Cloudflare; Twitter; Google; Boston Consulting Group; Charles Schwab Corporation; Minerva Networks
- Notable work: Don't Quit Your Day Job
- Awards: AWA Singapore International Businesswoman of the Year; APAC IT Woman of The Year; Singapore 100 Women in Tech
- Website: www.alizaknox.com

Aliza Knox is an author, columnist, public speaker and non-executive director based in Singapore. She served as the Head of APAC at Cloudflare from 2018 to 2020. She also served as the Vice President and Head of APAC at Twitter between 2012 and 2017. Knox was recognized as the APAC IT Woman of The Year in 2020. She was also named on the Singapore 100 Women in Tech list in the year 2021. Knox holds American as well as Australian citizenship and is a permanent resident of Singapore.

== Biography ==
Knox grew up in Chicago, Illinois, and the San Francisco Bay Area. She attended the University of Chicago Laboratory Schools and Palo Alto High School where she completed her early education. Later, she graduated magna cum laude from Brown University where she earned her Bachelor of Arts degree in Applied Math-Economics. Knox also attended the New York University where she obtained her Master of Business Administration with distinction in Marketing.

Knox began her professional career in 1981 at Bankers Trust in New York City, where she became an assistant vice president. She worked at Bankers Trust for six years. Between 1987 and 1999, Knox held senior positions at Boston Consulting Group in Sydney and Singapore. She was appointed Partner and Head of Asian Financial Services Practices in 1994.

Between 2002 and 2007, Knox served as a senior vice president at Visa international. She was responsible for the commercial payment products worldwide.

In 2007, Knox became managing director for Asia-Pacific at Google Inc. where she served till 2012. Between 2012 and 2017, Knox served in various regional roles with Twitter in Singapore, where she was ultimately named the vice president of APAC. From 2018 to 2020, Knox held the position of the Head of Asia Pacific at Cloudflare. She is now a non-executive director on public and private corporate boards.

In 2015, Knox was honored as the AWA Singapore International Businesswoman of the Year. She was also featured in the book Women on Board: Making a Real Difference in 2018. In 2020, Knox was awarded with the Woman of the Year title at the 2020 Women in IT Asia Awards. She received the award for her contributions in driving awareness of representation of women within cloud computing. In 2021, she was named to the Singapore 100 Women in Tech by Singapore Computer Society. In 2022, Knox authored a career advice book, Don't Quit Your Day Job. The book was published by Wiley and received positive reviews from various news outlets.

Knox is a diversity and gender equality advocate who has mentored at the Asian University for Women. She is a contributing columnist at Forbes and has written for Quartz as well as The Muse. Knox is a mentor at Minerva Networks where she helped launch Mentor Walks in Singapore, and is a and senior advisor at Boston Consulting Group.

== Honors ==
- AWA Singapore International Businesswoman of the Year – 2015
- APAC Women in IT Asia Awards (Women of the Year) – 2020
- Singapore 100 Women in Tech – 2021
