= 2016 Ford EcoBoost 400 =

Race details
- Race 36 of 36 in the 2016 NASCAR Sprint Cup Series
- Date: November 20, 2016
- Location: Homestead-Miami Speedway in Homestead, Florida
- Course: Permanent racing facility
- Course length: 1.5 miles (2.414 km)
- Distance: 268 laps, 402 mi (646.956 km)
- Scheduled distance: 267 laps, 400.5 mi (644.542 km)
- Weather: Temperatures hovering around 68.7 °F (20.4 °C); wind speeds up to 12.7 miles per hour (20.4 km/h)
- Average speed: 128.869 miles per hour (207.395 km/h)

Pole position
| Driver | Kevin Harvick | Stewart–Haas Racing |
- Time: 30.399

Most laps led
| Driver | Kyle Larson | Chip Ganassi Racing |
- Laps: 132

Winner
| No. 48 | Jimmie Johnson | Hendrick Motorsports |

Television in the United States
- Network: NBC
- Announcers: Rick Allen, Jeff Burton and Steve Letarte
- Nielsen ratings: 3.3/7 (Overnight); 3.5/8 (Final); 6.1 million viewers

Radio in the United States
- Radio: MRN
- Booth announcers: Joe Moore, Jeff Striegle and Rusty Wallace
- Turn announcers: Dave Moody (1 & 2) and Mike Bagley (3 & 4)

The 2016 Ford EcoBoost 400 was a NASCAR Sprint Cup Series race held on November 20, 2016, at Homestead–Miami Speedway in Homestead, Florida. Contested over 268 laps – extended from 267 laps due to an overtime finish – on the 1.5-mile (2.4-kilometre) oval, it was the 36th and final race of the 2016 NASCAR Sprint Cup Series season. Jimmie Johnson won the race, and with it his seventh career Cup championship, tying him with Dale Earnhardt and Richard Petty for the most Cup Series championships of all time.

It was the final race for Sprint as the series sponsor, having been the Cup Series' title sponsor since 2008, after buying out Nextel in late 2005. Monster Energy replaced Sprint as title sponsor for the series for 2017. The race was also the last for future Hall of Famers Tony Stewart and Carl Edwards, as well as the final in the Cup Series for Michael Annett.

With NASCAR introducing stage racing in all three national touring series in 2017, this was the last points-paying race in any of those series to be run as a single segment.

== Report ==
=== Tony Stewart's final race ===
The race marked the final start of three-time Sprint Cup Champion Tony Stewart after a farewell tour (of which he missed the first nine races due to a non-NASCAR racing accident), which took place a year after that of Jeff Gordon. Despite missing the first nine races, Stewart made the Chase with a win at Sonoma, but was eliminated in the first round. He started the race 11th, but finished 22nd.

=== Championship drivers ===
Jimmie Johnson was the first of the four drivers to clinch a spot in the Championship 4, winning the first race of the Round of 8 at Martinsville.

Carl Edwards clinched the second spot in the Championship 4, winning the second race of the Round of 8 at Texas.

Joey Logano clinched the third spot in the Championship 4, winning the third and final race of the Round of 8 at Phoenix.

Kyle Busch, the defending Cup champion, clinched the final spot, finishing second behind Logano at Phoenix to clinch his spot in the championship race.

=== Entry list ===
| No. | Driver | Team | Manufacturer |
|---|---|---|---|
| 1 | Jamie McMurray | Chip Ganassi Racing | Chevrolet |
| 2 | Brad Keselowski | Team Penske | Ford |
| 3 | Austin Dillon | Richard Childress Racing | Chevrolet |
| 4 | Kevin Harvick | Stewart–Haas Racing | Chevrolet |
| 5 | Kasey Kahne | Hendrick Motorsports | Chevrolet |
| 6 | Trevor Bayne | Roush Fenway Racing | Ford |
| 7 | Regan Smith | Tommy Baldwin Racing | Chevrolet |
| 10 | Danica Patrick | Stewart–Haas Racing | Chevrolet |
| 11 | Denny Hamlin | Joe Gibbs Racing | Toyota |
| 13 | Casey Mears | Germain Racing | Chevrolet |
| 14 | Tony Stewart | Stewart–Haas Racing | Chevrolet |
| 15 | Clint Bowyer | HScott Motorsports | Chevrolet |
| 16 | Greg Biffle | Roush Fenway Racing | Ford |
| 17 | Ricky Stenhouse Jr. | Roush Fenway Racing | Ford |
| 18 | Kyle Busch (CC) | Joe Gibbs Racing | Toyota |
| 19 | Carl Edwards (CC) | Joe Gibbs Racing | Toyota |
| 20 | Matt Kenseth | Joe Gibbs Racing | Toyota |
| 21 | Ryan Blaney (R) | Wood Brothers Racing | Ford |
| 22 | Joey Logano (CC) | Team Penske | Ford |
| 23 | David Ragan | BK Racing | Toyota |
| 24 | Chase Elliott (R) | Hendrick Motorsports | Chevrolet |
| 27 | Paul Menard | Richard Childress Racing | Chevrolet |
| 30 | Gray Gaulding | The Motorsports Group | Chevrolet |
| 31 | Ryan Newman | Richard Childress Racing | Chevrolet |
| 32 | Dylan Lupton (i) | Go FAS Racing | Ford |
| 34 | Chris Buescher (R) | Front Row Motorsports | Ford |
| 38 | Landon Cassill | Front Row Motorsports | Ford |
| 41 | Kurt Busch | Stewart–Haas Racing | Chevrolet |
| 42 | Kyle Larson | Chip Ganassi Racing | Chevrolet |
| 43 | Aric Almirola | Richard Petty Motorsports | Ford |
| 44 | Brian Scott (R) | Richard Petty Motorsports | Ford |
| 46 | Michael Annett | HScott Motorsports | Chevrolet |
| 47 | A. J. Allmendinger | JTG Daugherty Racing | Chevrolet |
| 48 | Jimmie Johnson (CC) | Hendrick Motorsports | Chevrolet |
| 49 | Matt DiBenedetto | BK Racing | Toyota |
| 55 | Reed Sorenson | Premium Motorsports | Toyota |
| 59 | Michael McDowell | Circle Sport – Leavine Family Racing | Chevrolet |
| 78 | Martin Truex Jr. | Furniture Row Racing | Toyota |
| 83 | Jeffrey Earnhardt (R) | BK Racing | Toyota |
| 88 | Alex Bowman (i) | Hendrick Motorsports | Chevrolet |
| 95 | Ty Dillon (i) | Circle Sport – Leavine Family Racing | Chevrolet |
Official entry list

== Practice ==
=== First practice ===
Ryan Newman was the fastest in the first practice session with a time of 30.789 and a speed of 175.387 mph (282.258 km/h).

| Pos | No. | Driver | Team | Manufacturer | Time | Speed |
|---|---|---|---|---|---|---|
| 1 | 31 | Ryan Newman | Richard Childress Racing | Chevrolet | 30.789 | 175.387 |
| 2 | 78 | Martin Truex Jr. | Furniture Row Racing | Toyota | 30.795 | 175.353 |
| 3 | 42 | Kyle Larson | Chip Ganassi Racing | Chevrolet | 30.812 | 175.256 |
Official first practice results

=== Second practice ===
Jimmie Johnson was the fastest in the second practice session with a time of 30.973 and a speed of 174.345 mph (280.581 km/h).

| Pos | No. | Driver | Team | Manufacturer | Time | Speed |
|---|---|---|---|---|---|---|
| 1 | 48 | Jimmie Johnson | Hendrick Motorsports | Chevrolet | 30.973 | 174.345 |
| 2 | 24 | Chase Elliott (R) | Hendrick Motorsports | Chevrolet | 31.154 | 173.332 |
| 3 | 19 | Carl Edwards | Joe Gibbs Racing | Toyota | 31.223 | 172.949 |
Official second practice results

=== Final practice ===
Martin Truex Jr. was the fastest in the final practice session with a time of 30.983 and a speed of 174.289 mph (280.491 km/h).

| Pos | No. | Driver | Team | Manufacturer | Time | Speed |
|---|---|---|---|---|---|---|
| 1 | 78 | Martin Truex Jr. | Furniture Row Racing | Toyota | 30.983 | 174.289 |
| 2 | 19 | Carl Edwards | Joe Gibbs Racing | Toyota | 31.029 | 174.031 |
| 3 | 31 | Ryan Newman | Richard Childress Racing | Chevrolet | 31.264 | 172.723 |
Official final practice results

== Qualifying ==
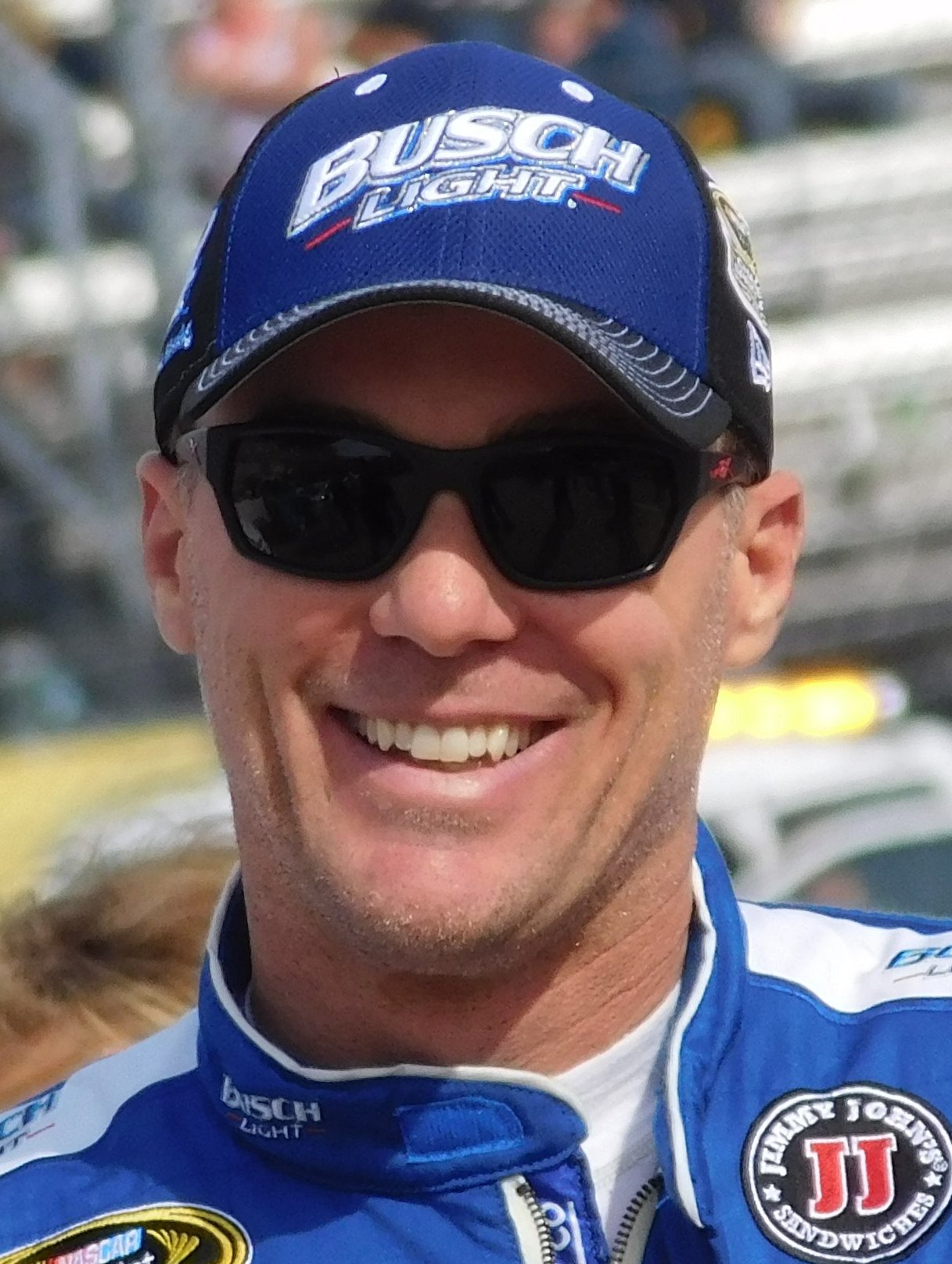
Kevin Harvick scored the pole position.

Kevin Harvick scored the pole for the race with a time of 30.399 and a speed of 177.637 mph (285.879 km/h). He said he was "just so proud of everybody on this Jimmy John's Chevrolet team. They want to come to the race track and bring good race cars and perform well. Just real proud of that. That's awesome. I didn't know if we had a chance at the pole with as fast as the No. 24 (Chase Elliott) had been. But I knew if we could just run the same speed every round, that is half the battle because you never know how much it is going to slow down for everybody else, and it doesn't take much to make a mistake. Really proud of everybody on our Jimmy John's team."

=== Qualifying results ===
| Pos | No. | Driver | Team | Manufacturer | R1 | R2 | R3 |
|---|---|---|---|---|---|---|---|
| 1 | 4 | Kevin Harvick | Stewart–Haas Racing | Chevrolet | 30.616 | 30.406 | 30.399 |
| 2 | 2 | Brad Keselowski | Team Penske | Ford | 30.412 | 30.456 | 30.416 |
| 3 | 31 | Ryan Newman | Richard Childress Racing | Chevrolet | 30.470 | 30.546 | 30.442 |
| 4 | 11 | Denny Hamlin | Joe Gibbs Racing | Toyota | 30.758 | 30.506 | 30.475 |
| 5 | 24 | Chase Elliott (R) | Hendrick Motorsports | Chevrolet | 30.217 | 30.243 | 30.492 |
| 6 | 78 | Martin Truex Jr. | Furniture Row Racing | Toyota | 30.698 | 30.445 | 30.513 |
| 7 | 20 | Matt Kenseth | Joe Gibbs Racing | Toyota | 30.699 | 30.492 | 30.594 |
| 8 | 21 | Ryan Blaney (R) | Wood Brothers Racing | Ford | 30.678 | 30.390 | 30.610 |
| 9 | 18 | Kyle Busch (CC) | Joe Gibbs Racing | Toyota | 30.766 | 30.466 | 30.689 |
| 10 | 19 | Carl Edwards (CC) | Joe Gibbs Racing | Toyota | 30.595 | 30.427 | 30.749 |
| 11 | 14 | Tony Stewart | Stewart–Haas Racing | Chevrolet | 30.717 | 30.552 | 30.861 |
| 12 | 47 | A. J. Allmendinger | JTG Daugherty Racing | Chevrolet | 30.652 | 30.467 | 30.887 |
| 13 | 22 | Joey Logano (CC) | Team Penske | Ford | 30.514 | 30.571 | |
| 14 | 48 | Jimmie Johnson (CC) | Hendrick Motorsports | Chevrolet | 30.816 | 30.635 | |
| 15 | 1 | Jamie McMurray | Chip Ganassi Racing | Chevrolet | 30.832 | 30.636 | |
| 16 | 41 | Kurt Busch | Stewart–Haas Racing | Chevrolet | 30.527 | 30.639 | |
| 17 | 3 | Austin Dillon | Richard Childress Racing | Chevrolet | 30.642 | 30.661 | |
| 18 | 17 | Ricky Stenhouse Jr. | Roush Fenway Racing | Ford | 30.794 | 30.688 | |
| 19 | 88 | Alex Bowman (i) | Hendrick Motorsports | Chevrolet | 30.761 | 30.742 | |
| 20 | 6 | Trevor Bayne | Roush Fenway Racing | Ford | 30.773 | 30.763 | |
| 21 | 16 | Greg Biffle | Roush Fenway Racing | Ford | 30.793 | 30.854 | |
| 22 | 44 | Brian Scott (R) | Richard Petty Motorsports | Ford | 30.828 | 30.860 | |
| 23 | 13 | Casey Mears | Germain Racing | Chevrolet | 30.769 | 30.862 | |
| 24 | 42 | Kyle Larson | Chip Ganassi Racing | Chevrolet | 30.648 | 31.078 | |
| 25 | 43 | Aric Almirola | Richard Petty Motorsports | Ford | 30.841 | | |
| 26 | 59 | Michael McDowell | Circle Sport – Leavine Family Racing | Chevrolet | 30.862 | | |
| 27 | 34 | Chris Buescher (R) | Front Row Motorsports | Ford | 30.863 | | |
| 28 | 27 | Paul Menard | Richard Childress Racing | Chevrolet | 30.876 | | |
| 29 | 5 | Kasey Kahne | Hendrick Motorsports | Chevrolet | 30.911 | | |
| 30 | 10 | Danica Patrick | Stewart–Haas Racing | Chevrolet | 30.916 | | |
| 31 | 49 | Matt DiBenedetto (i) | BK Racing | Toyota | 30.980 | | |
| 32 | 38 | Landon Cassill | Front Row Motorsports | Ford | 31.030 | | |
| 33 | 15 | Clint Bowyer | HScott Motorsports | Chevrolet | 31.043 | | |
| 34 | 95 | Ty Dillon (i) | Circle Sport – Leavine Family Racing | Chevrolet | 31.071 | | |
| 35 | 7 | Regan Smith | Tommy Baldwin Racing | Chevrolet | 31.087 | | |
| 36 | 23 | David Ragan | BK Racing | Toyota | 31.299 | | |
| 37 | 55 | Reed Sorenson | Premium Motorsports | Chevrolet | 31.657 | | |
| 38 | 83 | Jeffrey Earnhardt (R) | BK Racing | Toyota | 32.012 | | |
| 39 | 32 | Dylan Lupton (i) | Go FAS Racing | Ford | 32.523 | | |
| 40 | 46 | Michael Annett | HScott Motorsports | Chevrolet | 32.558 | | |
Did not qualify
| 41 | 30 | Gray Gaulding | The Motorsports Group | Chevrolet | 31.965 | | |
Official qualifying results

== Race ==
=== First half ===
Under mostly sunny Florida skies, Kevin Harvick led the field to the green flag at 3:24 p.m. The first caution of the race flew on lap 27 for Ryan Blaney crashing hard into the outside wall in turn 1. Denny Hamlin led a lap under the caution after missing the entrance to pit road. He pitted the next time by and handed the lead back to Harvick.

The race restarted on lap 32. Carl Edwards nudged Harvick in turn 4 to take the lead on lap 33. Harvick took it back on lap 35. A cycle of green flag stops started on lap 68. Harvick pitted from the lead the following lap and handed it to Edwards. He pitted on lap 72 and the lead cycled back to Harvick.

The second caution flew on lap 80 after Jeffrey Earnhardt spun out in turn 4.

The race restarted on lap 86 and Joey Logano beat Harvick to take over the lead. Edwards took the lead on lap 92. Kyle Larson worked his way through the field, catching Carl Edwards and passing him on the outside in turn 4 to take the lead on lap 119 just as another cycle of green flag stops started. Following the cycle, Edwards returned to the lead. A. J. Allmendinger was given a drive-through penalty for an uncontrolled tire.

=== Second half ===
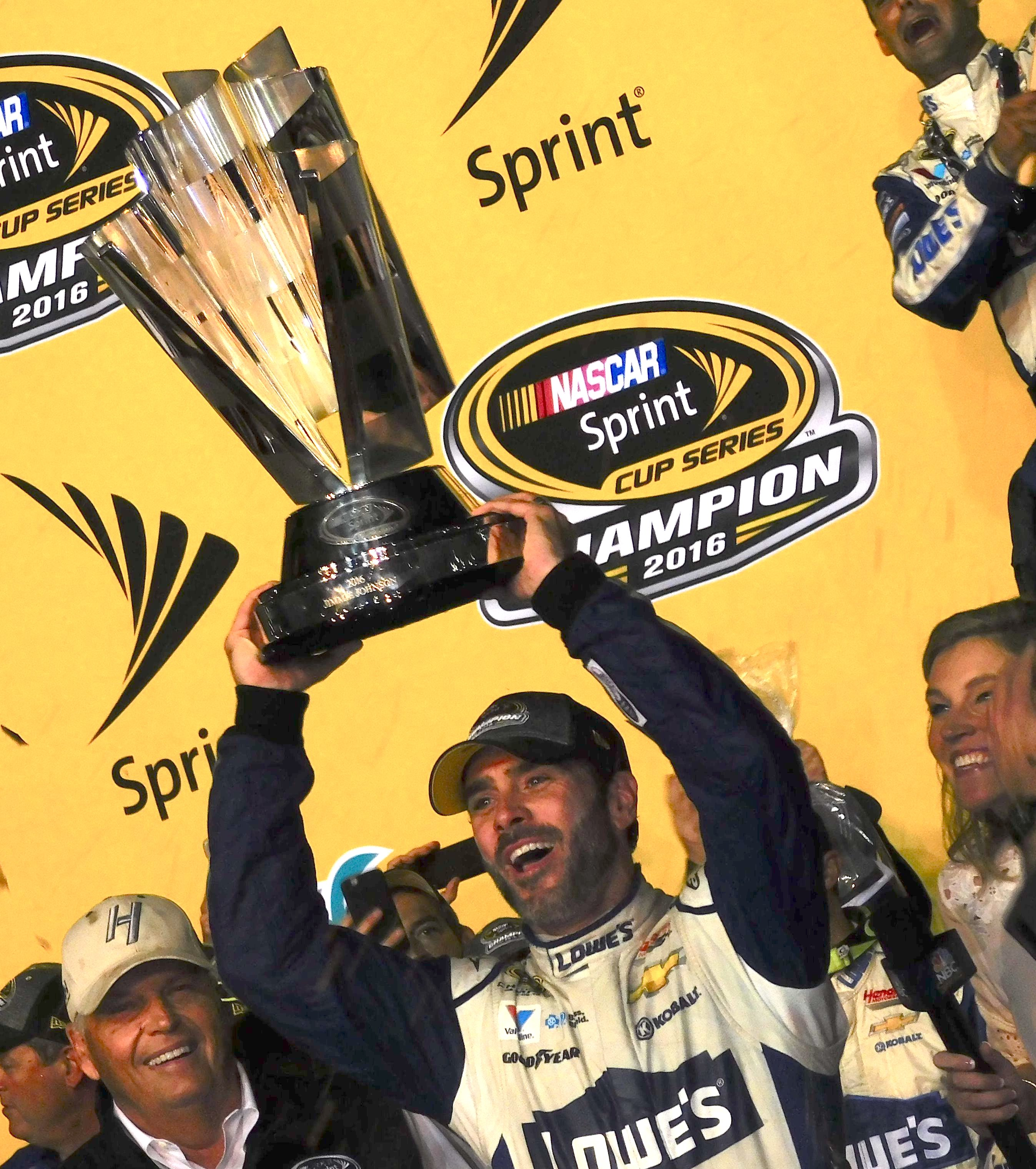
Jimmie Johnson won the race to claim a record-tying seventh Cup Series championship title.

Larson retook the lead on lap 126. Kyle Busch made an unscheduled stop for what he thought was a flat right-front tire on lap 137, only to find out a few laps later the tire wasn't flat. Another round of green flag stops commenced on lap 153 and Larson retained the lead through the cycle.

Debris in turn 1 brought out the third caution on lap 171.

The race restarted on lap 171. The fourth caution flew with 61 laps to go for Blaney again crashing hard in turn 1

The race restarted with 55 to go. The fifth caution flew with 15 to go for Dylan Lupton spinning in turn 2.

The race restarted with 10 to go and the sixth caution flew right away for a multi-car wreck in turn 1. On the restart, Edwards went low to block Logano's advance. But in doing so, he came across Logano's nose and got spun into the inside wall. His now destroyed car continued up the track and was lifted into the air after being rear-ended by Kasey Kahne's car. Regan Smith was also collected by the wreck. Logano's car continued, got tapped by Edwards's car and sent into his teammate, Brad Keselowski's car. This sent Brad into the wall along with Ryan Newman. Martin Truex Jr. was also collected and his car burst into flames. It brought out the red flag for 31 minutes and nine seconds. Edwards walked from his wrecked car to the pit box of the 22 team to explain to Todd Gordon (Logano's crew chief) what happened. He said what happened "was just good hard racing, and it was my deal, I own it. I had to block Joey to have any chance at winning the championship. I couldn’t have gone to bed tonight if I had given up that lane to him.” He also told Gordon to "go and get the championship."

The race restarted with five to go and the seventh caution flew for Ricky Stenhouse Jr. getting loose, spinning out in turn 2, turning down the track and hitting the inside wall on the backstretch.

==== Overtime ====
The race restarted in overtime with two laps to go. Jimmie Johnson took the lead from Larson coming to the white flag and drove on to score the victory and his seventh Sprint Cup Series championship.

== Post-race ==
=== Driver comments ===
After the race, an overwhelmed Johnson said "Luck came our way and we were able to win the race and win the championship.” He also stated his desire to go for an eighth championship, saying he didn't "know what the chances [were], but let's go."

Mentor and former teammate Jeff Gordon said he was "just in disbelief the way this race unfolded....Jimmie wanted that thing. He wanted that seventh championship and he got that seventh championship done. He deserves it. Just an amazing experience."

Teammate Dale Earnhardt Jr., gauging from the largely supportive fan reaction, said he thought "people are coming around [to liking Johnson]. He's always had a great understanding with his people, his fans. Now others are realizing how great he is. I can tell you this. I have no doubt that you can take Jimmie, my dad and Richard Petty and they would have won championships races whenever and wherever they raced. If Jimmie had raced against Dad, Dad wouldn't have won seven championships; and if Dad had raced against Jimmie, he wouldn't have won seven championships. Again, I think people are coming around. I hope so."

Michael McDowell, who earned his fourth career top-10 finish, said "it’s good momentum. Everybody at Circle Sport Leavine Family Racing we’ve been making great progress. Todd Parrott and all the guys at [CSLFR] gave me a great car today. We were up in the top 16-17. A little attrition there at the end, it got crazy. Great restart that last restart, my lane went and snuck out a top-10 pretty cool."

Tony Stewart came home 22nd in his final Sprint Cup Series race. He was as fiery and temperamental as ever in his final start while cursing on his radio channel over a NASCAR-mandated lineup change, saying he "raced. I did what I do every time I get in the car. I didn’t think of anything else other than just racing the race. We got behind there and we tried something to make ground and got caught out and had to run 60 laps on a set of tires. At the end, the line-up there was... let’s say confusing. I was still screaming about that just like I would on any other race. I was true to my form all the way to the end." Johnson gave Stewart his "Chasing 7" helmet he wore during the race as a parting gift.

== Race results ==
| Pos | No. | Driver | Team | Manufacturer | Laps | Points |
|---|---|---|---|---|---|---|
| 1 | 48 | Jimmie Johnson (CC) | Hendrick Motorsports | Chevrolet | 268 | 40 |
| 2 | 42 | Kyle Larson | Chip Ganassi Racing | Chevrolet | 268 | 41 |
| 3 | 4 | Kevin Harvick | Stewart–Haas Racing | Chevrolet | 268 | 39 |
| 4 | 22 | Joey Logano (CC) | Team Penske | Ford | 268 | 37 |
| 5 | 1 | Jamie McMurray | Chip Ganassi Racing | Chevrolet | 268 | 36 |
| 6 | 18 | Kyle Busch (CC) | Joe Gibbs Racing | Toyota | 268 | 35 |
| 7 | 20 | Matt Kenseth | Joe Gibbs Racing | Toyota | 268 | 34 |
| 8 | 47 | A. J. Allmendinger | JTG Daugherty Racing | Chevrolet | 268 | 33 |
| 9 | 11 | Denny Hamlin | Joe Gibbs Racing | Toyota | 268 | 32 |
| 10 | 59 | Michael McDowell | Circle Sport – Leavine Family Racing | Chevrolet | 268 | 31 |
| 11 | 24 | Chase Elliott (R) | Hendrick Motorsports | Chevrolet | 268 | 30 |
| 12 | 3 | Austin Dillon | Richard Childress Racing | Chevrolet | 268 | 29 |
| 13 | 41 | Kurt Busch | Stewart–Haas Racing | Chevrolet | 268 | 28 |
| 14 | 27 | Paul Menard | Richard Childress Racing | Chevrolet | 268 | 27 |
| 15 | 44 | Brian Scott (R) | Richard Petty Motorsports | Ford | 268 | 26 |
| 16 | 88 | Alex Bowman (i) | Hendrick Motorsports | Chevrolet | 268 | 0 |
| 17 | 16 | Greg Biffle | Roush Fenway Racing | Ford | 267 | 24 |
| 18 | 13 | Casey Mears | Germain Racing | Chevrolet | 267 | 23 |
| 19 | 10 | Danica Patrick | Stewart–Haas Racing | Chevrolet | 266 | 22 |
| 20 | 6 | Trevor Bayne | Roush Fenway Racing | Ford | 266 | 21 |
| 21 | 38 | Landon Cassill | Front Row Motorsports | Ford | 266 | 20 |
| 22 | 14 | Tony Stewart | Stewart–Haas Racing | Chevrolet | 266 | 19 |
| 23 | 15 | Clint Bowyer | HScott Motorsports | Chevrolet | 266 | 18 |
| 24 | 34 | Chris Buescher (R) | Front Row Motorsports | Ford | 266 | 17 |
| 25 | 31 | Ryan Newman | Richard Childress Racing | Chevrolet | 264 | 16 |
| 26 | 21 | Ryan Blaney (R) | Wood Brothers Racing | Ford | 264 | 15 |
| 27 | 49 | Matt DiBenedetto (i) | BK Racing | Toyota | 264 | 14 |
| 28 | 46 | Michael Annett | HScott Motorsports | Chevrolet | 264 | 13 |
| 29 | 23 | David Ragan | BK Racing | Toyota | 264 | 12 |
| 30 | 17 | Ricky Stenhouse Jr. | Roush Fenway Racing | Ford | 262 | 11 |
| 31 | 83 | Jeffrey Earnhardt (R) | BK Racing | Toyota | 261 | 10 |
| 32 | 55 | Reed Sorenson | Premium Motorsports | Toyota | 259 | 9 |
| 33 | 95 | Ty Dillon (i) | Circle Sport – Leavine Family Racing | Chevrolet | 258 | 0 |
| 34 | 19 | Carl Edwards (CC) | Joe Gibbs Racing | Toyota | 257 | 7 |
| 35 | 2 | Brad Keselowski | Team Penske | Ford | 257 | 6 |
| 36 | 78 | Martin Truex Jr. | Furniture Row Racing | Toyota | 257 | 5 |
| 37 | 5 | Kasey Kahne | Hendrick Motorsports | Chevrolet | 257 | 4 |
| 38 | 7 | Regan Smith | Tommy Baldwin Racing | Chevrolet | 255 | 3 |
| 39 | 32 | Dylan Lupton (i) | Go FAS Racing | Ford | 250 | 0 |
| 40 | 43 | Aric Almirola | Richard Petty Motorsports | Ford | 213 | 1 |
Official race results

=== Race summary ===
- Lead changes: 20 among 6 different drivers
- Cautions/Laps: 7 for 33 laps
- Red flags: 1 for 31 minutes, 9 seconds
- Time of race: 3 hours, 7 minutes, 10 seconds
- Average speed: 128.869 miles per hour (207.395 km/h)

== Media ==
=== Television ===
NBC covered the race on the television side. Rick Allen, Jeff Burton and Steve Letarte had the call in the booth for the race. Dave Burns, Mike Massaro, Marty Snider and Kelli Stavast handled pit road on the television side. While the race itself aired on NBC, NBCSN aired NBCSN NASCAR Hot Pass, a simultaneous live feed dedicated to each of the Chase drivers, with commentary by Leigh Diffey and Parker Kligerman. Also, three different angles from in-car cameras and a track map tracked the driver's position and changes throughout the field.

NBC
| Booth announcers | Pit reporters |
|---|---|
| Lap-by-lap: Rick Allen; Color commentator: Jeff Burton; Color commentator: Steve Letarte | Dave Burns; Mike Massaro; Marty Snider; Kelli Stavast |

=== Radio ===
MRN handled the radio call for the race, which was simulcast on Sirius XM NASCAR Radio.

MRN
| Booth announcers | Turn announcers | Pit reporters |
|---|---|---|
| Lead announcer: Joe Moore; Announcer: Jeff Striegle; Announcer: Rusty Wallace | Turns 1 & 2: Dave Moody; Turns 3 & 4: Mike Bagley | Alex Hayden; Winston Kelley; Steve Post |

== Final season standings ==
Drivers' Championship standings

| | Pos | Driver | Points |
|---|---|---|---|
| 1 | 1 | Jimmie Johnson | 5,040 |
| 1 | 2 | Joey Logano | 5,037 (–3) |
| 1 | 3 | Kyle Busch | 5,035 (–5) |
| 1 | 4 | Carl Edwards | 5,007 (–33) |
| | 5 | Matt Kenseth | 2,330 (–2,710) |
| | 6 | Denny Hamlin | 2,320 (–2,720) |
| | 7 | Kurt Busch | 2,296 (–2,744) |
| 3 | 8 | Kevin Harvick | 2,289 (–2,751) |
| 1 | 9 | Chase Elliott | 2,285 (–2,755) |
| 2 | 10 | Kyle Larson | 2,273 (–2,767) |
| 3 | 11 | Martin Truex Jr. | 2,271 (–2,769) |
| 3 | 12 | Brad Keselowski | 2,267 (–2,773) |
| | 13 | Jamie McMurray | 2,231 (–2,809) |
| | 14 | Austin Dillon | 2,223 (–2,817) |
| | 15 | Tony Stewart | 2,211 (–2,829) |
| | 16 | Chris Buescher | 2,169 (–2,871) |
Official driver's standings

Manufacturers' Championship standings

| Pos | Manufacturer | Points |
|---|---|---|
| 1 | Toyota | 1,477 |
| 2 | Chevrolet | 1,452 (–25) |
| 3 | Ford | 1,388 (–89) |
Official manufacturers' standings

- Note: Only the first 16 positions are included for the driver standings.

| Previous race: 2016 Can-Am 500 | Sprint Cup Series; 2016 season | Next race: 2017 Daytona 500 |
