= Minerva Networks =

Minerva Networks, Inc. is an American company based in Silicon Valley that develops video compression technology and broadcast systems used for delivery of video services over broadband IP networks, interactive television (iTV) services, and video conferencing.

Founded in 1992, Minerva also makes data compression hardware used to transmit video over IP networks.

In 2006, Nortel Networks and Minerva announced that they would jointly develop an Application Interface (API) enabling the integration of real-time IPTV services with Minerva's iTVManager software, allowing it to interoperate with Nortel's IMS service delivery platform.

As of June 2008, Minerva Networks changed focus to developing IPTV middleware and applications software with over 220 telco deployments worldwide. In the same month, the company also announced ten significant new IPTV installations, including Mt. Horeb Telephone in Wisconsin, Tullahoma Utilities in Tennessee, and GTA TeleGuam in Guam.
