= Kenneth Sonderleiter =

American bootlegger

Kenneth Sonderleiter (c. 1899 - August 25, 1959) was an American bootlegger and businessman in Des Moines, Iowa. He was most active during the Prohibition Era, when he smuggled and sold alcohol illegally throughout the city. In 1931 he was arrested and sentenced to two years in prison for his activities. After release, he became a business owner, running a penny arcade and zoo in Des Moines.

== Life and career ==
Sonderleiter was born c. 1899. He had six brothers.

=== Bootlegging career ===
In 1921, shortly after entering the bootlegging trade, Sonderleiter was arrested for violating the Volstead Act. Upon his release, he began purchasing large quantities of illegal liquor and publicized himself, going so far as to distribute business cards and brochures with information on where people could purchase alcohol from him. He quickly entered into a business arrangement with Joe Irlbeck, a fellow bootlegger who operated out of the Hotel Fort Des Moines. Under their arrangement, Irlbeck supplied Templeton Rye to Sonderleiter at wholesale prices for distribution.

Sonderleiter was assaulted by competing bootleggers in 1925 and spent six weeks in the hospital as a result. Shortly thereafter, a battery shop that he ran as a front business was raided. He was arrested and tried before a grand jury but said that he had been framed, claiming that the alcohol found had been planted there. His defense was successful and the grand jury did not pursue charges. He was arrested again in 1927 after police found 32 gallons of alcohol in his vehicle. Before being arrested he led police on a car chase through the city. The ensuing investigation link Sonderleiter to a bootlegging ring in Chicago, but Sonderleiter plead guilty and received only a fine.

In 1930, Sonderleiter and two associates disguised themselves as prohibition agents and kidnapped a local bootlegger who Sonderleiter suspected of hijacking a shipment of alcohol from Chicago. After a lengthy interrogation session that involved beating the bootlegger and shooting him in the side of his head, they abandoned him in an empty lot. The bootlegger contacted the police, who arrested Sonderleiter and one of his associates after a lengthy shootout. A different bootlegger, Jack Harris, was killed in the shootout and Sonderleiter was charged with murder (later amended to manslaughter) and kidnapping. He entered a please of "not guilty" and was held on a $50,500 bail (equivalent to $973,282 in 2025). While Sonderleiter's associate was sentenced to eight years in prison, Sonderleiter himself was found not guilty and eventually released.

In June 1931, Sonderleiter was arrested for beer possession, however, the charges were dismissed after an investigation determined the beer did not have enough alcohol to be considered "real." That September, Sonderleiter and his wife Faye were indicted by the federal government for "conspiracy to violate the Volstead Act" after a months-long infiltration operation by the Bureau of Prohibition. Unlike his previous indictments, the evidence was overwhelming and Sonderleiter pled guilty. He was sentenced to two years in Leavenworth Penitentiary and required to pay a $2,000 fine (equivalent to $38,546 in 2025). His wife received half the sentence and was sent to the Federal Prison Camp, Alderson. After his arrest, other bootleggers in the city proposed consolidating the industry and creating a legal defense fund, but the proposal never got off the ground.

=== Post-prohibition career ===
By the time Sonderleiter was released from prison, the Twenty-first Amendment to the United States Constitution had passed, marking the end of the Prohibition era. Sonderleiter continued his alcohol distribution activities in the new landscape but was not as successful due to the increased competition that came with the re-legalization of alcohol. His legal troubles did not end—In 1933 he opened a beer wholesaler but was charged with "furnishing a saloon" the following year. He was charged with various alcohol-related crimes in 1938, 1939, 1943, and 1944.

In addition to his alcohol distribution, Sonderleiter operated a variety of businesses in Des Moines, including a penny arcade and lunch stand. In 1937, he opened a zoo that became known for his unique publicity tactics, which included selling monkey meat. In 1943, after failing to construct suitable housing for his zoo's lions, he claimed that he would sell "lionburgers" at his lunch stand. In 1945, Sonderleiter assisted with the capture of a polar bear that escaped from a railway car in Boone, Iowa. In 1950, after years of attempting to convince the city to create a public zoo, Sonderleiter announced that he could not afford to feed the animals and that the zoo had been "on half-ration" for some time. The Governor of Iowa, William S. Beardsley, had a shipment of supplies sent to the zoo to keep the animals alive. Two years later, in 1952, Sonderleiter closed the zoo and sold the animals.

Sonderleiter attempted to enter politics on numerous occasions, running for both city safety commissioner and sheriff of Des Moines in 1940. In 1944, Sonderleiter ran for city safety commissioner of Des Moines. He fell ill with a case of the mumps and, unable to campaign, finished eleventh out of fourteen candidates. He ran for streets commissioner in 1946 but lost that race as well.

== Personal life ==
Sonderleiter was described in Bryce Bauer's 2014 book Gentlemen Bootleggers as being five feet and nine inches tall, with "classic good looks" and a lengthy scar across the front of his neck. He married Faye Sonderlieter, who assisted in his bootlegging activities, in 1927. The two had one son. Sonderlieter died on August 25, 1959. Faye died on August 3, 1970.

A speakeasy at the Iowa Taproom in Des Moines is named after Sonderleiter.
