= Holy White Hounds =

American rock band

- Origin: Des Moines, Iowa, US
- Genres: Alternative rock; hard rock; garage rock
- Years active: 2005–present
- Labels: Razor & Tie
- Members: Brenton Dean; Ambrose Lupercal; Seth Luloff; James Manson
- Website: www.holywhitehounds.com

Holy White Hounds is an American rock band from Des Moines, Iowa. They have released two studio albums, Sparkle Sparkle by Razor & Tie in 2016 and Say It With Your Mouth in 2018. They released two EPs in 2020, Soak the Master Sessions and Soak the Master Sessions Volume II.

== Band members ==
- Brenton Dean – lead vocals, lead guitar (2005–present)
- Ambrose Lupercal – bass guitar (2005–present)
- Seth Luloff – drums (2015–2018)
- James Manson – guitar (2005–present)

== Discography ==
=== Studio albums ===
Title
Sparkle Sparkle
- Released: May 6, 2016
- Label: Razor & Tie
- Formats: CD, digital download

Title
Say It with Your Mouth
- Released: 2018
- Label:
- Formats: CD, digital download

=== Singles ===
Title	Year	Peak chart positions			Album
Title	Year	Mainstream Rock	Alternative	Rock Airplay	Album
"Switchblade"	2016	10	35	31	Sparkle Sparkle
"Blind"	2016	—	—	—	Sparkle Sparkle
"—" denotes a single that did not chart or was not released in that territory.
