= Dwight L. Armstrong =

American hymn composer (1904–1984)

Dwight Leslie Armstrong
- Born: September 15, 1904; Des Moines, Iowa, U.S.
- Died: November 17, 1984 (aged 80)
- Resting place: Washington State
- Known for: Composer of over one hundred hymns utilized primarily in churches that have their origins in the Worldwide Church of God
- Spouse: Karen Hill Armstrong (1923-2014)
- Children: 1

Dwight Leslie Armstrong (15 September 1904 – 17 November 1984) was an American composer of hymns based upon texts from the Psalms and other books of the Christian Bible. He was the younger brother of Worldwide Church of God (WCG) founder Herbert W. Armstrong, and uncle of American WCG evangelist Garner Ted Armstrong. He was married to Karen Hill Armstrong (not to be confused with Karen Armstrong) and was the father of one daughter, Deborah.

== Early life and religious faith ==
Dwight Armstrong was born to Horace Elon Armstrong and Eva Wright Armstrong in Des Moines, Iowa on 12 September 1904, along with a twin sister Mary Lucille Armstrong. The Armstrongs had come to the United States from England with William Penn. Like his brother Herbert, Dwight was raised in the Quaker religion. In his early adult life, he was employed in Portland, Oregon.

There are conflicting accounts pertaining to the conversion and baptism of Dwight Armstrong. According to one report, around the spring of 1927 Dwight Armstrong "accepted Christ while attending a Quaker congregation in Portland, Oregon". Subsequently, both Armstrong brothers were baptized during the Pentecost season of that year by Dr. Dean, pastor of the Hinson Memorial Baptist Church in Portland, Oregon. In the 1986 edition of Herbert W. Armstrong's Autobiography edited by Dr. Herman L. Hoeh, on pages 416-417, it is suggested that Dwight answered an altar call given by his brother in December 1930 in Harrisburg, Oregon, and was subsequently baptized by his brother.

In 1931, the family moved to a farm south of Oregon City, Oregon. The father died in early 1933, and Dwight remained on the farm until about 1947. After the founding of Ambassador College that year, Dwight moved with his mother to San Gabriel, California.

As of the mid-1950s, he was caring for his mother, who was living with him at the time. In 1953, Karen Hill (sister of longtime Worldwide Church of God minister David Jon Hill) came to Ambassador College in Pasadena to serve as a receptionist and telephone operator. In time, her duties grew to include caring for Mrs. Armstrong.

According to David Jon Hill, "Karen and Dwight became acquainted in this manner and got married in 1954. This made for some sort of further relationship with me and the Armstrongs that I never did figure out -- if I had kept at it I probably would have found out that I was my own grandpa. Dwight, as most know, was the composer of most of the Hymns in the Church Hymnal, used for so many years, and an accomplished violinist. He was a quiet man and kept mostly to himself -- a good match for my sister's social ability and talkative nature."

== Publication of hymns ==
The origins of Dwight Armstrong's creative work can be traced to the evangelistic campaign conducted by his brother Herbert in the summer of 1933 in Eugene, Oregon. An elderly attendee at the campaign declined to participate in hymn singing, citing his belief that many of the hymns being used were not doctrinally and scripturally sound. The attendee was quoted by Armstrong as saying, "It is just as sinful to sing a lie as to tell one." This led Armstrong to explore the possibility of using hymns based on scriptures. Incidentally, in recent years, particularly with the 2008 edition of the Baptist Hymnal, other faith communities have adopted stringent standards of ensuring that the hymns included in new hymnals are scripturally and doctrinally sound in accordance with their own beliefs.

Herbert has described the moment that led him to commission his brother to compose hymns for the church: "One day I heard my youngest brother, Dwight, play on the piano a piece he had composed. It was not four-part harmony, but was in the style of a four-part harmony hymn. I was intrigued. It had quality and character. I had known from the time my brother was a small child that he had a special musical talent. I immediately asked him to compose two or three hymns, setting words from the Psalms to music. It took some little time, but they were good ".

When Ambassador College was opened in 1947, Herbert asked Dwight to "devote full time to setting the words of Psalms—and/or any other Scripture—to music in the four-part harmony style of hymns.". The first known use of Armstrong's hymns was at the 1948 Feast of Tabernacles, an annual celebration of the Church, in Belknap Springs, Oregon. In a 31 October 1948 letter to the membership, Herbert described the singing of the hymns as follows, "The songs, of course, were all new and had to be learned. But we found them BEAUTIFUL---some of the tunes so 'catchy' they simply would not leave the mind---yet of such quality, coupled with the exquisite words of divine inspiration, that they were described as 'classics,' carrying a dignity and character of divine royalty---songs befitting the regal splendor of a King---yes, songs inspired by and sung to, THE King! Somehow, after singing the gracious expressive words of Holy Scripture, the hymns written by mortal man seemed hollow and empty and cheap and common---employing flowery words to say so little" (emphasis his).

The lyrics of many of Armstrong's hymns are believed to have been developed based on rhymed psalters. Some of these psalters include the Book of Psalms for Singing (published by the Board of Education and Publication, Reformed Presbyterian Church of North America), the Psalter Hymnal (published by the Christian Reformed Church), and the Psalms of David in Metre (commonly referred to as the "Scottish Psalter"). Armstrong is also thought to have utilized psalm settings by John Milton and William Kethe. As of the mid-1990s, Ambassador University Music Department chair Ross F. Jutsum had a large volume of psalm paraphrases, which is said to have been a primary source for Dwight Armstrong's selection of psalm lyric settings.

The first hymns composed by Armstrong carried a copyright of 1948. Some of these were revised and several more were published in 1952, with more being published in 1958. The final group of hymns were published c. 1972-1974. Dwight's wife, Karen, was heavily involved with all of the compositions, helping her husband set lyrics to the music. The editions of the hymnal produced by the Worldwide Church of God between 1972 and 1974 were produced under the editorial direction of Ambassador College Music Department Chair Lucy H. Martin and Ambassador College student John Zahody.

The most recent hymnal produced by the Worldwide Church of God was printed in 1993, and included eighty-four of Armstrong's previously published hymns as well as many internationally well-known hymns such as Battle Hymn of the Republic. Following Dwight's death in 1984, Herbert announced that a new hymnal was in the works and was to include dozens of new hymns written by Dwight during the late 1970s and early 1980s. However, the editorial team that worked on the revised hymnal chose to include only previously published hymns by Dwight, along with numerous other well-known hymns and hymns composed by several other members of the Worldwide Church of God, including Ambassador College Music Department Chairman Ross F. Jutsum. Dwight's daughter, Deborah L. Armstrong, retains the original, unpublished hymns in her father's own handwriting.

The recollections of John D. Schroeder, who was the conductor of the Ambassador Chorale in the 1980s, reflect Dwight Armstrong's modesty. Schroeder wrote, "He once told me, personally, in his home, 'My brother says God called me to write these hymns; I think the truth is that my brother wanted me to write these hymns.'...Dwight Armstrong was a kind soul and painfully aware of his limitations as a composer. After listening to a performance of one of his hymns by the Ambassador Chorale, he told me, 'I’m sure no Beethoven.' Truth is, he agonized over his inability to write at the level of great composers, even though a comfortable majority of those who sang his songs loved them."

In addition to his hymns Dwight also wrote a school song for Ambassador College titled "Our Ambassador." However, this song does not appear to have ever been officially adopted, with the only known copy being held in the Worldwide Church of God archives in Glendora, California. The Church archives also contain several seldom-performed solo vocal settings of the psalms by Dwight Armstrong.

Some of Armstrong's hymns have also been published in the hymnals of churches which have their origins in the Worldwide Church of God, including the Church of God the Eternal; the Church of God International; the Intercontinental Church of God; Church of God, a Worldwide Association; United Church of God; and the Living Church of God.

== Listing and description of hymns ==
This section is divided into three sections: hymns based on the psalms, hymns based on other books from the Old Testament, and hymns based on books from the New Testament.

=== The Psalms ===
Title	Scripture Source	Original Publication Date	Previous Editions
Blessed and Happy Is the Man	Psalm 1:1-4	1972	Appeared as "The First Psalm" in 1968 Radio Church of God hymnal
Why Do the Nations Make Plans in Vain?	Psalm 2	1972	

There are no hymns based on the famous Psalm 23, perhaps because there were several readily available hymn settings by other composers.

There are three hymns based on Psalm 25: "Our God Is Good and Upright", "To Thee I Lift My Soul", and "Mine Eyes Upon the Lord Continually Are Set".

"When Israel Out of Egypt Went", based on Psalm 114, is often sung at Passover services and during the Festival of Unleavened Bread.

=== Other Old Testament verses ===
Title	Scripture Source	Original Publication Date	Previous Editions
I Will Sing to the Eternal	Exodus 15	1972	

There are four published hymns based on other Old Testament texts: "I Will Sing To The Eternal" (based on the Song of Moses as recorded in Exodus 15); "Thee Will I Love, O Lord" (based on II Samuel 22, ); "Blow the Horn, Let Zion Hear!" (based on Joel 2 and excluded from the 1993 Worldwide Church of God hymnal because of its thematic matter); "Behold, the Day Will Come" (based on Zechariah 14). The latter two hymns are often sung during the Church's fall festival season, specifically on the Feast of Trumpets (or Rosh Hashannah), the Feast of Tabernacles (or Sukkot), and the Last Great Day.

=== The New Testament ===
Title	Scripture Source	Original Publication Date	Previous Editions
Go Ye Therefore, Into All the World		1972	Appeared as "Go Ye Into All the World" in the 1968 Radio Church of God hymnal

There are three frequently published hymns based on New Testament texts: "Go Ye Therefore Into All the World" (based on the Great Commission of Jesus Christ as recorded in Matthew 28 and Mark 16; "Not Many Wise Men Now Are Called" (based on I Corinthians 1); "If I Have Not Charity" (I Corinthians 13).

== Recordings and adaptations ==
During the 1970s, a concert band arrangement of the hymn "Holy Might Majesty" appeared on an album produced by the Young Philadelphians, a student ensemble based at Ambassador College. A jazz-like gospel version of the same hymn was recorded by Chris Jasper (a member of the Isley Brothers from 1973 to 1984) on the 1992 album Praise the Eternal.

In the early 1980s, a four-cassette set of hymns was recorded by the Ambassador Chorale and Young Ambassadors of Ambassador College, joined by Worldwide Church of God choir members from nearby congregations in California. In addition, Ross F. Jutsum recorded a four-cassette set of "piano only" recordings of all of Dwight Armstrong's hymns published in the 1974 edition of the Bible Hymnal.

== Death ==
Armstrong's last hymns were published in 1974, ten years before his death. According to the July 1984 issue of the Ambassador Report, Armstrong was "among those who were no longer actively supporting the Worldwide Church [of God] during the mid-1970s". However, Dwight faithfully paid tithes to the Church until his death and also attended church services when his health permitted. Dwight's wife, Karen, left the church in 1974. However, despite their having been "unequally yoked" (at least from a religious standpoint), Karen and Dwight remained married until his death.

On 1 April 1984, Herbert W. Armstrong wrote a letter to the membership of the Worldwide Church of God regarding the declining health of his brother. In response to the letter, there was a great outpouring of sympathy from the membership. As Dwight lay on his deathbed, the Armstrongs received hundreds of cards, letters and gifts as well as donations to help with medical bills.

Dwight Leslie Armstrong died of cancer on 17 November 1984 at the age of 80, and was buried on 23 November 1984, in Quilcene, Washington, about a half-hour drive from Sequim, Washington, where he and his family lived. According to a 1985 issue of the Ambassador Report, his funeral was attended by his wife Karen, his twin sister Mary Lucile Edmonson of Ashland, Oregon, many Worldwide Church of God ministers, Roderick C. Meredith, and nephew Garner Ted Armstrong. His daughter, Deborah Armstrong was also in attendance. Herbert W. Armstrong was in Bangladesh at the time and was unable to attend.

Joseph W. Tkach, who ascended to the office of Pastor General of the Worldwide Church of God in 1986, related the events of the funeral in the Pastor General's Report: "About 40 were present to pay their last respects to a man whose music has played such a vital role in God's church for almost 40 years. Messrs. Dibar Apartian, Ralph Helge, Herman Hoeh, Roderick Meredith, and I were present for the funeral service, which was conducted by Mr. Richard Parker, pastor of the Kent, Washington congregation...Those present joined in singing the hymn Mr. Armstrong composed from Psalm 141, 'Hear My Cry Eternal One.". Dwight's wife Karen and his daughter, Deborah were also present at the funeral. Karen arranged the funeral so that an 8-year-old boy, who had been taking violin lessons from Dwight, played 'Hear My Cry Oh Eternal One' on Armstrong's prized violin - which he had bequeathed to the boy.

His daughter, Deborah Armstrong, received a Bachelor of Arts from Ambassador College, worked as a writer for The World Tomorrow television program following her graduation in 1989, and later served on the Ambassador International Cultural Foundation humanitarian project in St. Petersburg (then Leningrad), Russia in the early 1990s. Following her return from Russia, Deborah embarked on a career in television news. She spent the following years working as TV reporter in the Pacific Northwest during which time she won two Emmys (National Academy of Television Arts and Sciences Northwest Chapter 2001 and 2002.)

Dwight Armstrong's hymns continue to be sung in some congregations that have their origins in the Worldwide Church of God (renamed Grace Communion International in 2009) which announced on 26 June 2006 that all hymns written by Armstrong that were currently copyrighted by the Church were being placed in the public domain, thus facilitating wider use of Armstrong’s hymns.
