= The Nadas =

American folk rock band

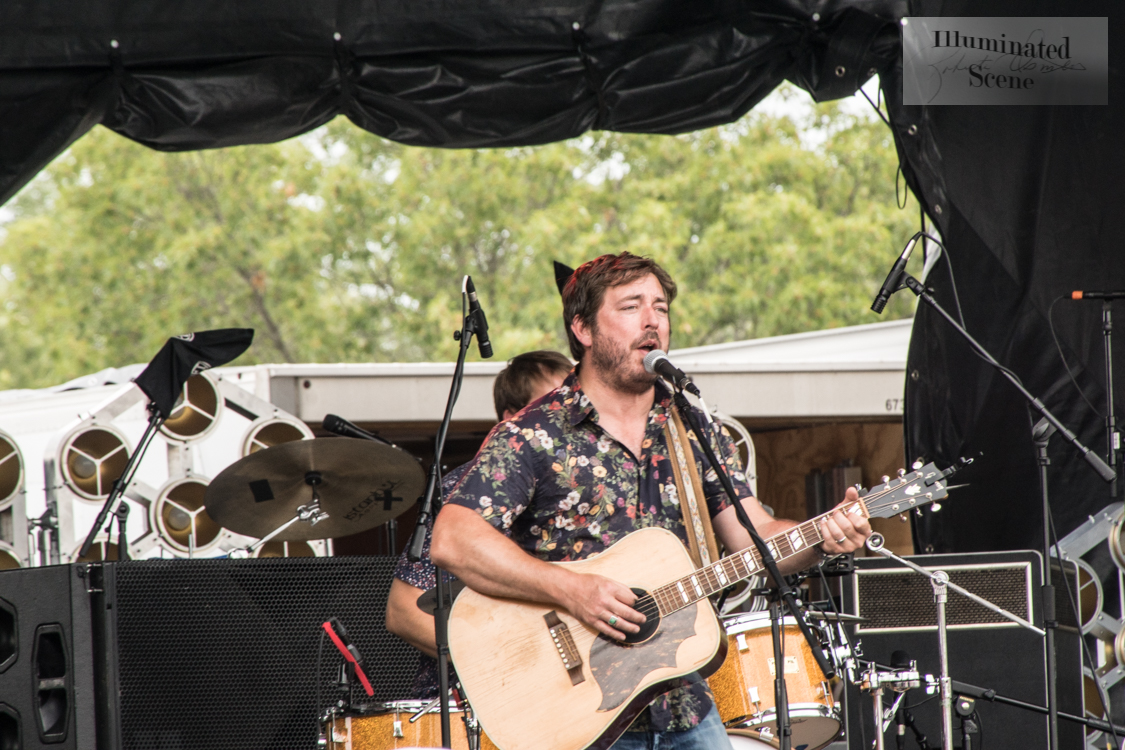

Background information
- Origin: Des Moines, Iowa
- Genre: Folk rock
- Years active: since 1995
- Label: Authentic Records
- Members: Mike Butterworth; Jason Walsmith; Brian Duffey; Brandon Stone; Perry Ross
- Past members: Tony Bohnenkamp; Brett Nelson; Justin Klein; Ian Sheperd; Wil Masisak; Scott Dawson; Jon Locker; Jason Smith; Becca Smith; Jen McGivern; Ross Vanderwerf; Chad Johnson; Neil Stoffregen; Joanne Tucker
- Website: www.thenadas.com

The Nadas are a folk rock quintet based in Des Moines, Iowa. Formed in 1995 in Ames, Iowa, the band earned early success on the local college scene, eventually becoming the house band for People's Bar and Grill in Ames. Their lineup as of 2022 consists of guitarist/vocalist Mike Butterworth, guitarist/vocalist Jason Walsmith, bassist Brian Duffey, drummer Brandon Stone, and keyboardist/percussionist Perry Ross.

== History ==
Their initial success resulted in the first of seven albums, titled, "Not A Sound,"—a phonetic allusion to the band's name. Following the success of "Not A Sound," the band members embarked on the first of what would become regular tours, traveling throughout the country and performing at a variety of venues. The band was called "The Best College Band You've Never Heard Of" by Playboy Magazine in 2001.

The Nadas' music is featured on the local arts-and-crafts show Courage to Create, airing on KDSM-TV Sunday mornings. "Carve Your Name" from the Coming Home CD is the show's theme song. The title song from Listen Through the Static, written about small community radio station KDNK-FM in Carbondale, CO, was featured on the December 2005 MacAddict CD-ROM. Their "Walk Away" is sung at the end of a competition on Speed Channel's Pinks, after the winner has been determined.

The Nadas performed at SXSW in 2006 and did the opening act for the Des Moines show for Bon Jovi on their Have A Nice Day Tour at the Wells Fargo Arena.

In the summer of 2007, The Nadas joined with Chicago radio personality Steve Dahl for a six-concert tour of the Chicago area, billed as "Steve Dahl and the Dahlfins".

In April 2008, the song "Good Night Girl" was featured on Paste Magazine's 41st Sample CD.

The Nadas song "Feel Like Home" is the community anthem for the Des Moines, Iowa "Do More" campaign.

The band's album "Almanac" found the band releasing a new song each month throughout 2009 as a musical snapshot of that year.

In 2018, The Nadas were inducted into the Iowa Rock and Roll Hall Of Fame.

On the January 15, 2020, episode of Democracy Now, during the run-up to the 2020 Iowa caucuses, the band's 1997 song "Run in Place" was featured as a series of musical interludes.

== Discography ==
=== Albums ===
- Not a Sound (1995, Nomad Records)
- New Start (1997, Nomad Records)
- Coming Home (2000, Authentic Records)
- Transceiver (2003, Authentic Records)
- Listen Through the Static (2005, Authentic Records)
- The Ghosts Inside These Halls (2008, Authentic Records)
- Almanac (2010, Authentic Records)
- Lovejoy Revival (2013, Authentic Records)
- One Louder (2018, Authentic Records)
- Static Sessions (2019, Authentic Records)
- Duo Numero Uno (2020, Authentic Records)

=== Live albums ===
- En Vivo! (2000)
- Show to Go (2001)
- Any Given Living Room (2017, Authentic Records)
