= Minerva (ship) =

Many vessels have been named Minerva for the mythological figure Minerva:

- Minerva (1773 ship) was a merchantman launched in the East Indies. She traded there for more than 20 years before she made three voyages for the British East India Company (EIC). The first EIC voyage was from 1796 to 1798. In 1799 she transported convicts from Ireland to Australia while under charter to the EIC. From Australia she sailed to Bengal, and then back to Britain. She underwent repairs in 1802 and then traveled to St Helena and Bengal for the EIC. She was lost in 1805 or 1806 under circumstances that are currently unclear.
- Minerva (1775 Connecticut ship) owned by Captain William Griswold, was selected by the colony of Connecticut for naval service. In September of that year the colony issued commissions for the ship's officers. In November, the Continental Congress, governor and his Council of Safety ordered the ship to intercept two transports bound from England for Quebec. The crew refused to obey this order. The crew were discharged and a new crew hired, but before they could sail, in December the ship was returned to its owner by the Assembly. In April 1778, the ship reemerged under state control. In 1781 it was purchased by the Continental Congress.
- Minerva (1786 EIC ship) was launched as an East Indiaman. She made seven voyages for the British East India Company (EIC), and one carrying rice from Bengal for the British government. She is last listed in 1805 but with stale data from 1802.
- Minerva (1791 ship) was launched at Galway. She traded widely, particularly as a West Indiaman. Between 1802 and 1804 she made two voyages as a slave ship. She then returned to trading with the West Indies. She was last listed in 1813.
- Minerva (1795 ship) was launched in 1795 at Lancaster as a West Indiaman. In 1801 she was captured but immediately recaptured. Between 1802 and 1808 she made five voyages as a slave ship. She was last listed in 1816.
- Minerva (1799 ship) was taken in prize from the Spanish, and may have been built in America. Between 1799 and 1807 she made six voyages as a slave ship. She is last listed in 1813 but with data stale since her last slave voyage in 1807.
- Minerva (1805 ship) was launched at Lancaster, Lancashire. Following trading with Central and South America, she made two voyages under charter to the British East India Company (EIC) between 1811 and 1814. She also made four voyages transporting convicts to Australia between 1818 and 1824, one to Van Diemen's Land and three voyages to New South Wales. She was broken up in 1826.
- Minerva (1805 whaler) was the French letter of marque Minerve, which the Royal Navy captured in September 1804. Samuel Enderby & Sons purchased her c.1805 for use as a whaler. She was taken off the coast of Peru circa August 1805 after a crewman had killed her captain and her crew had mutinied.
- Minerva (1812 ship) was launched at Aberdeen. Her career is obscure. Circa 1823 she visited New South Wales and was condemned at Valparaiso in 1823 on her way home.
- Minerva (1813 Aberdeen ship) was launched in 1813 at Aberdeen. She traded across the Atlantic. She was wrecked in the St Lawrence on 13 May 1820.
- Minerva (1816 ship), ship built in 1816. She made twelve whaling voyages from New Bedford between 1831 and 1856 before being withdrawn in 1860.
- Minerva (1834 ship), later known as Spliigen, was the first paddle steamer to operate on Lake Zurich in Switzerland.
- Minerva (183? ship), schooner owned by ship owner George Elder of Kirkcaldy, Scotland, used to transport his son Alexander Lang Elder to South Australia in 1840.
- MV Minerva, a cruise liner built in 1989 and named Minerva in 1996.
- PS Minerva (1893), a Glasgow and South Western Railway paddle steamer launched in 1893. She served with the Royal Navy from 1916 and was sold into civilian service in Turkey in 1924. She was scrapped by 1928.

== See also ==
- HMS Minerva
- USS Minerva
- Minerva II
