= Minerva (given name) =

Female given name

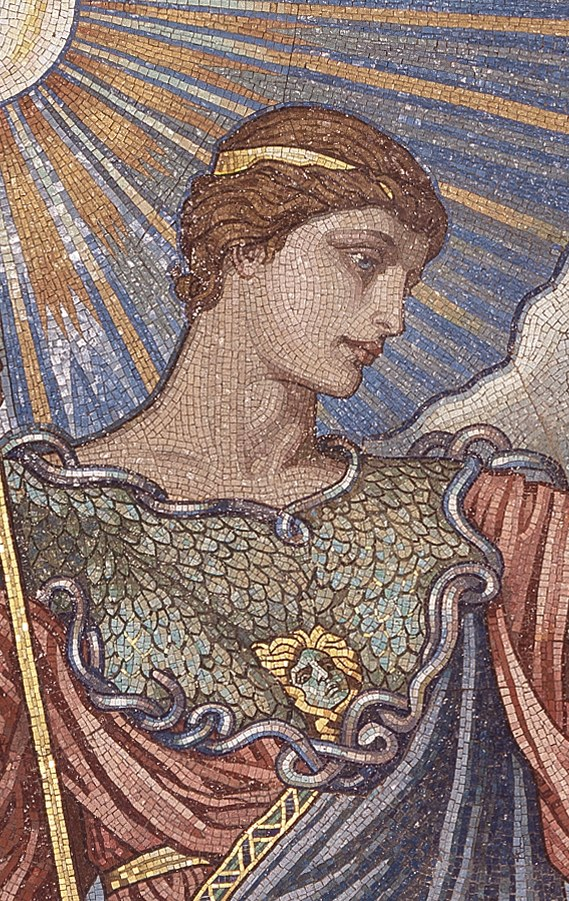
- Minerva of Peace by Elihu Vedder in the Library of Congress.
- Gender: Feminine

Origin
- Origin: Etruscan, Latin, Proto-Indo-European, Proto-Italic
- Meaning: Intelligence, thought, understanding

Other names
- Nicknames: Mini, Minnie, Minou
- Related names: Manerva, Manervia, Menerva, Menirva, Minervah, Minervia, Minervy, Minirva (American English spelling variants); Mínerva (Icelandic); Minerve (French); Minerwa (Polish)

Minerva is a feminine given name usually given in reference to the Ancient Roman goddess of wisdom. The name Minerva stems from Proto-Italic *meneswo ("intelligent, understanding"), and ultimately from Proto-Indo-European (PIE) *menos ("thought").

== Usage ==
The name was in regular use by the 19th century in the Anglosphere, particularly in the United States, where it was among the 300 most used names for American girls between 1880 and 1890, among the top 500 names until 1922, and among the top 1,000 names until 1973.

American English spelling variations in use in the United States also included Manerva, Manervia, Menerva, Menirva, Minervah, Minervia, Minervy, and Minirva. Also in use in the United States were the French version, Minerve, and the Polish version, Minerwa. Usual short forms for the name include Minnie and spelling variant Mini. Nervy has been documented as a nickname in use in the Southern United States.

It has also been in regular use in Spain and other Spanish-speaking countries. Minerva is also a surname.

== People named Minerva ==
=== As first name ===
- Minerva Anguissola (1539–1566), Italian writer and Latin scholar and sister of artist Sofonisba Anguissola
- Minerva Dayton Bateham (1856–1885), American poet and hymn writer
- Minerva Bernardino (1907–1998), Dominican diplomat and women's rights activist
- Minerva Bloom (1959–2018), Mexican poet and nature photographer
- Minerva Kline Brooks (1883–1929), American dance teacher and supporter of women's suffrage
- Minerva Bussenius (1896–1966), American stage and silent film actress known professionally as Roberta Arnold
- Minerva G. Carcaño (born 1954), American Methodist Church bishop
- Minerva "Eva" Castillo (1969–2022), Filipina singer
- Minerva Castillo Rodríguez (born 1955), Mexican politician
- Minerva J. Chapman (1858–1947), American painter
- Minerva Cordero, Puerto Rican mathematician and academic
- Minerva Cuevas (born 1975), Mexican conceptual artist
- Minerva Goodman (1876–1967), American physician, suffragist, and clubwoman
- Minerva Fabienne Hase (born 1999), German pair skater
- Minerva Hernández Ramos (born 1969), Mexican politician
- Minerva Herrera (1929–2016), Cuban folk singer
- Minerva Hamilton Hoyt (1866–1945), American activist
- Minerva Koenig (born 1960), American author
- Minerva Mena (1939–2004), Mexican actress and university professor
- Minerva Parker Nichols (1863–1949), American architect
- Minerva Brace Norton (1837–1894), American educator and writer
- Minerva Pious (1903–1979), Ukrainian-born Jewish-American radio, television, and film actress
- Minerva Reid (1871–1957), Canadian teacher, medical doctor, and politician
- Minerva Sanders (1837–1912), American librarian
- Minerva "Minou" Tavárez Mirabal (born 1956), Dominican philologist, professor and politician
- Minerva Teichert (1888–1976), American artist
- Minerva Willis (c. 1820–?), Choctaw freedwoman and musician
- Minerva Yeung, Hong Kong born American research scientist and educator

=== As middle name ===
- Mary Minerva Haskell (1869–1953), American congregationalist missionary in Bulgaria.
- Anna Minerva Henderson (1887–1987), Canadian teacher, civil servant, and poet
- Annie Minerva Turnbo Malone (1877–1957), American businesswoman, inventor and philanthropist
- Estelle Minerva Hatch Merrill (1858–1908), American journalist and editor
- Ida Minerva Tarbell (1857–1944), American writer, investigative journalist, biographer, and lecturer
- Minerva Urecal (born Florence Minerva Dunnuck; 1894–1966), American stage and radio performer
- Mabel Minerva Young (1872–1963), American mathematician and academic

=== Pen name ===
- Minerva (Internet celebrity) (Korean: 미네르바), Internet username of a "netizen" who wrote critically in online forums about South Korean economic policies

=== Religious name ===
- Elena Anguissola (1532–1584), Italian painter and Roman Catholic nun also known as Sister Minerva

=== Stage name ===
- Minerva, stage name of American strongwoman Josephine Blatt (née Schauer; 1869–1923)
- Maria Minerva, stage name of Estonian musician and activist Maria Juur (born 1988)

=== Fictional characters ===
- Minerva, the child heroine of the 1987 American television film You Ruined My Life
- Minerva, one of the wicked stepsisters in the 1997 television movie Cinderella
- Minerva, a character in the 1994 book Midnight in the Garden of Good and Evil
- Aunt Minerva, a character on the 1977–1978 American television series Tabitha
- Doctor Minerva, Marvel Comics character
- Princess Minerva, heroine of the role-playing video game Princess Minerva developed and published by Riverhillsoft for the NEC PC-9801 in 1992 in Japan
- Minerva Clark, the main character of a series of children's mystery novels by Karen Karbo
- Minerva "Mini" Drogues, the main character of the 2006 American satiric neo-noir black comedy film Mini's First Time
- Minerva Wattiswade Grey, a character from the Outlander series of novels and the Lord John series of mystery novels by Diana Gabaldon
- Minerva Hadley, a character on the British drama television series Noughts + Crosses
- Becky "Minerva" McCaskill, a character on the New Zealand television soap opera Shortland Street
- Minerva Campbell, a mother and doctor character from popular 2010 cartoon Adventure Time
- Minerva McGonagall, a character in the Harry Potter universe
- Minerva "Mini" McGuinness, a character from the British television series Skins
- Minerva Mink, an anthropomorphic mink character on the 1993 American animated comical musical television program Animaniacs
- Minerva Mouse, the full name of anthropomorphic cartoon mouse character Minnie Mouse
- Minerva Paradzio, a character in the Artemis Fowl series of novels by Eoin Colfer.
- Minerva Tomgallon, a character in the 1936 novel Anne of Windy Poplars by L.M. Montgomery
