= Minerva (disambiguation) =

Minerva is the Roman goddess of crafts and wisdom. The name may also refer to:

== People ==
- Minerva (given name), including a list of people with the name

=== Mononym or pseudonym ===
- Minerva (Internet celebrity), South Korean netizen known for his economic predictions
- Josephine Blatt (c. 1869–1923), American strongwoman who used the stage name Minerva
- Maria Minerva, Maria Juur (born 1988), Estonian musician

=== Surname ===
- Francesco Minerva (1904–2004), Italian Roman Catholic prelate
- Michèle Minerva (1959–2021), French pétanque player
- Ponce de Minerva (1114/1115–1175), Occitanian nobleman, courtier, governor, and general

== Places ==
=== Australia ===
- Minerva, Queensland, a locality in the Central Highlands

=== Pacific Ocean ===
- Minerva Reefs, two submerged atolls between Tonga and New Zealand
- Republic of Minerva, a self-declared South Pacific republic on the Minerva Reefs

=== United States ===
- Minerva, Kentucky
- Minerva, New York
- Minerva, Ohio
- Minerva, Oregon
- Minerva, Texas
- Minerva, West Virginia

=== Land development ===
- Minerva plc, a London-based British developer and property firm
- Minerva Building, a skyscraper once planned for the eastern edge of London's main financial district
- Lokhandwala Minerva, a skyscraper under construction in Mumbai, Maharashtra, India

== Entertainment ==
=== Games ===
- MINERVA (mod), a modification for the video game Half-Life 2
- Minerva, a character in the final cutscene of Assassin's Creed II
- Minerva, a character in Fire Emblem: Shadow Dragon and the Blade of Light
- Minerva, a class in the MMORPG Elsword
- Ex Machina: Minerva, a character used by Celica A. Mercury in the fighting game series BlazBlue

=== Comics ===
- Doctor Minerva, a Marvel Comics character who is a Kree scientist
- Cheetah (character), a DC Comics character whose name is Barbara Ann Minerva
- Minxy Minerva, a Wildstorm character who has appeared in Welcome to Tranquility

=== Manga and anime ===
- Minerva, a character from the Transformers franchise
- Minerva class battleship, a fictional class of space vessels from the anime series Mobile Suit Gundam SEED Destiny
- Fencer of Minerva, a hentai anime series
- Minerva Orland, a character in Fairy Tail
- Minene Uryuu, a character in Future Diary

=== Animation ===
- Minerva Campbell, the mother of Finn from Adventure Time
- Minerva Mink, a character from Animaniacs
- Minerva Mouse, the full name of Minnie Mouse

=== Music ===
- "Minerva" (song), a 2003 single by Deftones
- "Minerva", a 2005 song by Ani DiFranco, from Knuckle Down

=== Novels ===
- Minerva (Re:Zero), a character in the light novel series Re:Zero − Starting Life in Another World
- Minerva Hadley, a character in the Noughts & Crosses book series by Malorie Blackman
- Minerva McGonagall, a character in the Harry Potter book series by J. K. Rowling
- Minerva Paradizo, a character in the book Artemis Fowl: The Lost Colony by Eoin Colfer
- Minerva, a ship and supporting character in The Baroque Cycle book series by Neal Stephenson
- Minerva, a setting in the book A World of Difference by Harry Turtledove
- Minerva, a setting in the Giants series by James P. Hogan
- Minerva, a computer which becomes a human female in Robert A. Heinlein's 1973 Time Enough for Love
- In Harry Turtledove's novel A World of Difference, the orbit of Mars is occupied by an Earth-sized planet called Minerva
- Minerva, a character in Midnight in the Garden of Good and Evil by John Berendt, based on Valerie Bowles

=== Theatre ===
- Minerva Theatre, Chichester, England, opened in 1989
- Minerva Theatre, Kolkata, India, built in 1893
- Minerva Theatre, Sydney, Australia 1939–1950
- Minerva, a character in the 1929 West End musical Mr. Cinders

=== Other arts and media ===
- Minerva Film, an Italian film distribution company operating between 1912 and 1956
- Minerva Tonfilm, a German film production company active in the 1930s
- Minerva (painting), a 1635 painting by Rembrandt

== Publications ==
- Minerva (German magazine), a nineteenth century journal published by Johann Wilhelm von Archenholz
- Minerva (archaeology magazine), an international review of ancient art and archaeology
- Minerva (Norwegian periodical), a Norwegian liberal conservative periodical first published in 1924
- Minerva (Springer journal), a peer-reviewed sociology journal established in 1962
- Minerva (Welsh periodical), earliest title of Swansea History Journal
- Minerva Medica, a medical journal in Italian
- Minerva, an intellectual magazine originally funded by the CIA via the Congress for Cultural Freedom

== Science and technology ==
=== Astronomy and space ===
- 93 Minerva, an asteroid discovered in 1867
- MINERVA (spacecraft), a mini-lander on the uncrewed spacecraft Hayabusa
- MINiature Exoplanet Radial Velocity Array (MINERVA), ground-based search for exoplanets
- Minerva, a name originally proposed for the planet Pluto
- Minerva, the name of the European Space Agency's segment of the SpaceX Crew-4 mission

=== Automotive ===
- Minerva (automobile), a Belgian luxury automobile manufactured from 1902 until 1938
- Minerva Armored Car, a World War I armoured car

=== Biology ===
- Minerva (alga), a genus of red algae in the family Bangiaceae
- Minerva (bird), a genus of prehistoric owls

=== Computing and telecommunication ===
- MINERVA, a European Union organization concerned with the digitisation of cultural and scientific content
- MINERVA (cable system), a submarine telecommunications cable system linking Italy and Cyprus
- Minerva (model), a large language model developed at the Sapienza University of Rome
- Minerva (QDOS reimplementation), a reimplementation of Sinclair QDOS
- Minerva Initiative, a plan that looks to tap into the community of area specialists and other university researchers
- Minerva Networks, a company that develops video compression technology and broadcast systems

=== Medicine ===
- Minerva cast, a type of orthopedic cast enclosing the patient's trunk and head
- A brand name of co-cyprindiol (cyproterone acetate/ethinylestradiol), an oral contraceptive

=== Physics ===
- MINERνA, a neutrino scattering experiment

== Ships ==
- Minerva (ship), several ships
- HMS Minerva, several ships of the British Royal Navy
- USS Minerva, several ships of the US Navy
- Minerva-class corvette, a class of ships of the Italian Marina Militare

== Other uses ==
- Editura Minerva, a Romanian publishing house
- Minerva Bunkering, a marine fuel logistics company
- Minerva roundabout, famous landmark in Guadalajara, Jalisco
- The Minerva Initiative, a U.S. Department of Defense program
- Minerva F.C., a 19th-century amateur football club in England
- Fuji Xerox Minerva AFC, an American football team in Ebina, Kanagawa, Japan, playing in the X-League X2 division
- Minerva University, a private university based in San Francisco, California

== See also ==
- Minerve (disambiguation)
