= Minerve =

Minerve is the French spelling of Minerva, an ancient Roman goddess.

Minerve or La Minerve may refer to:

== Places ==
- La Minerve, Quebec, Canada, a village and municipality
- Minerve, Hérault, France, a commune

== Ships ==
- French ship Minerve, numerous French Navy ships
- Minerve-class submarine, a pre-World War II French Navy class
- Minerve-class frigate, a class of six French Navy frigates completed in the 1780s and 1790s
- HMS Minerve, three Royal Navy ships
- Neapolitan ship Minerve (1791), a frigate surrendered to France in 1801 and renamed Sibylle

== Newspapers ==
- La Minerve, a Quebec newspaper from 1826 to 1899
- La Minerve (French newspaper), first published in 1818

== Other uses ==
- Minerve (airline), a former French airline
- La Minerve, a giant ascension balloon envisioned by Étienne-Gaspard Robert in 1820

== See also ==
- Minerva (disambiguation)
