= Choi See-joong =

South Korean politician (born 1937)

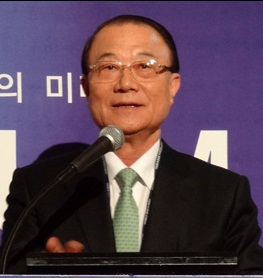

Korean name
- Hangul: 최시중
- Hanja: 崔時仲
- RR: Choe Sijung
- MR: Ch'oe Sijung

Choi See-joong (Korean: 최시중; born 4 August 1937) is a South Korean politician who is the former chief of the Korea Communications Commission. He is notable for supporting controversial decisions in the South Korean telecommunication scene. He resigned on 27 January 2012, due to his involvement in bribery.

== Criticism ==
- Choi See-joong has been criticized for defending the Lee Myung-bak government by supporting the SPO's active investigations against "anti-GNP" rumors in the social network services, akin to the Minerva incident.
- He was criticized for supporting "a huge emphasis on advertisements for the Chojoongdong TV stations".
- The SPO investigated Kim Hak-in (김학인), the chairman of the board Korea Broadcasting Art School, for giving bribes to Choi See-joong in order to guarantee a director position of Educational Broadcasting System for Kim. There is a further allegation that the closest associate of Choi See-joong, Jung Yong-uk (정용욱), has obtained a huge amount of bribes and moved to Canada.

== See also ==
- Lee Myung-bak
