= Minnie =

Minnie is a feminine given name. It can be a diminutive (hypocorism) of Minerva, Winifred, Wilhelmina, Willemina, Winona, Margaret, Hermione, Jasmine, Mary, Miriam, Maria, Marie, Naomi, Miranda, Clementine, Dominique, Dominic, or Amelia. It may refer to:

== People with the given name ==
- Minne Atairu, Nigerian artist who generates synthetic Benin Bronzes
- Minnie Lou Bradley (1931–2025), American cattle rancher
- Minnie Tittell Brune (1875–1974), American stage actress
- Minnie Campbell (1862–1952), Canadian clubwoman, lecturer, and editor
- Minnie D. Craig (1883–1966), American legislator and the first female speaker of a state House of Representatives (North Dakota) in the United States
- Minnie Fisher Cunningham (1882–1964), suffrage politician and first executive secretary of the League of Women Voters
- Minnie Devereaux (1891–1984), Canadian Cheyenne silent film actress
- Minnie Dupree (1873–1947), American stage and film actress
- Minnie Egener (1881–1938), American operatic mezzo-soprano
- Minnie Evans (1892–1987), African-American folk artist
- Minnie Maddern Fiske (1865–1932), leading American actress
- Minnie Rutherford Fuller (1868–1946), American farmer, broker, temperance leader, suffragist
- Minnie Gentry (1915–1993), American actress
- Minnie Goodnow (1871 – 1952), American nurse and nursing educator
- Minnie Braithwaite Jenkins (1874–1954), American school teacher and educator
- Minnie Lansbury (1889–1922), English suffragette
- Minnie Marx (1865–1929), mother and manager of the Marx Brothers, born Miene Schönberg
- Minnie Mumford, better known as Jerri Mumford (1909–2002), Canadian military servicewoman during World War II
- Minnie Nast (1874–1956), German soprano
- Minnie Ward Patterson, American poet and author
- Minnie Pwerle (between 1910 and 1922–2006), Australian Aboriginal painter
- Minnie Rayner (1869–1941), British film actress
- Minnie Riperton (1947–1979), singer and songwriter
- Minnie Soo (born 1998), Hong Kong table tennis player
- Minnie T. Wright (c. 1874–c. 1929), American composer and pianist
- Minnie T. Wright (fl. 1920s–1930s), African American clubwoman

== People with the nickname ==
=== Women ===
- Maria Feodorovna (Dagmar of Denmark) (1847–1928), Empress of Russia, known within her family as Minnie
- Minnie Cormack (1862 - 1919), Irish-British painter and engraver
- Minnie Dean (1844–1895), only woman to receive the death penalty in New Zealand
- Minnie Driver (born 1970), English actress and singer-songwriter
- Minnie Hauk (1851–1929), American operatic soprano
- Minnie Pearl (1912–1996), stage name for American comedienne Sarah Ophelia Colley Cannon
- Minnie Vautrin (1886–1941), American missionary who saved the lives of many women during the Nanking Massacre
- Minnie Warren (1849–1878), American dwarf associated with P. T. Barnum
- Memphis Minnie (1897–1973), American blues singer
- Minnie West (born 1993), stage name for Mexican actress Amparo West Serrano
- Minnie (singer) (born 1997), Thai singer and member of K-pop group I-dle

=== Men ===
- Roy McGiffin (1891–1918), ice hockey player
- Minnie Mendoza (born 1933), Cuban retired Major League Baseball player and coach
- Minnie Miñoso (1923–2015), Cuban retired Major League Baseball and Negro leagues player
- Minnie Rojas (1933–2002), Major League Baseball relief pitcher

== Fictional characters ==
- Minnie Mouse, an animated character in Disney media, girlfriend of Mickey Mouse
- Minnie Bannister, on the British radio series The Goon Show, played by Spike Milligan
- Minnie Crozier, on the New Zealand soap opera Shortland Street
- Minnie Caldwell, on the British soap opera Coronation Street
- Minnie the Minx, a comic strip character from The Beano
- Minnie Bishop, from the anime/manga Strike Witches
- Minnie Fay, in the musical Hello, Dolly! and the film adaptation
- Minnie Goetze, the lead and titular character in the semi-autobiographical graphic novel The Diary of a Teenage Girl and the film adaptation

== Other ==
- Minnie (chimpanzee) (died 1998), the only female chimpanzee in the US Mercury space program, backup to Ham (chimpanzee)
- "Minnie the Moocher", a song first recorded by Cab Calloway in 1931
