= French ship Minerve =

Fifteen ships of the French Navy have borne the name Minerve, in honour of the Greek goddess Minerva.

== Ships named Minerve ==
- Minerve (1757), a 26-gun frigate, lead ship of her class (1757–1762)
- Minerve (1778), a 32-gun frigate (1778–1781)
- Diane (1779), a 32-gun Sibylle-class frigate, was started as Minerve
- Minerve (1782), a 40-gun frigate, lead ship of her class (1782–1794)
- Spartiate (1794), a 16-gun corvette (1794–1795), bore the name
- Minerve (1794), a 40-gun frigate (1794–1809)
- Minerve (1797), a 58-gun ship of the line (1797–1799)
- Président (1804), a 40-gun frigate, was started as Minerve
- Minerve (1805), a 44-gun Armide-class frigate (1805–1806)
- Minerve (1806), a 44-gun frigate (1806–1814)
- Minerve (1809), a captured Portuguese 48-gun frigate (1809–1810)
- Minerve (1831), a 32-gun frigate (1836–1874)
- Minerve (1865), a steam frigate of the Vénus class
- Minerve (1934), a submarine of the FNFL (1936–1946)
- Minerve (S647), a Daphné-class submarine (1964–1968)
Ships of the French Navy named Minerve
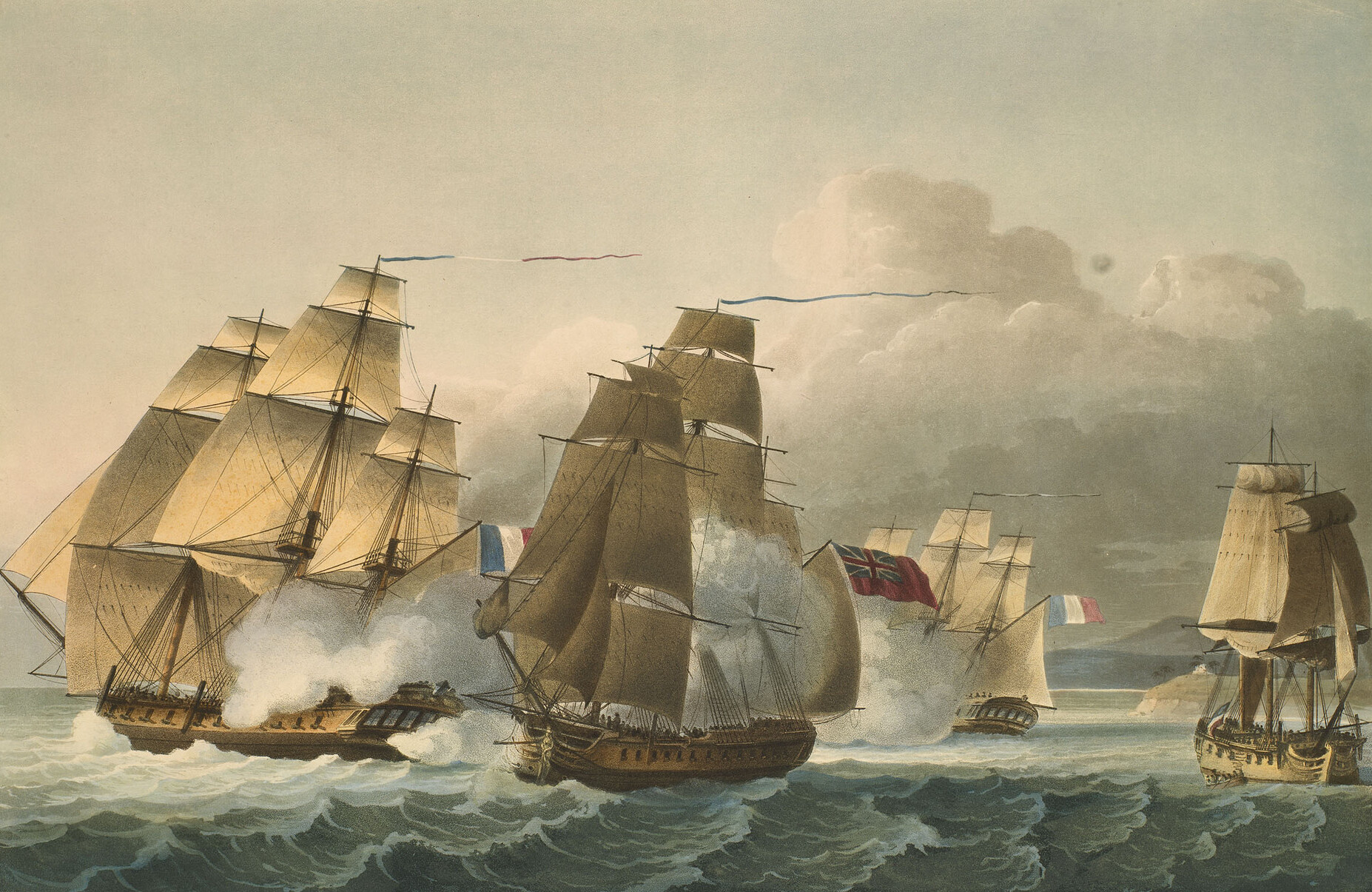
Minerve (1782) (centre) serving in the Royal Navy as HMS St Fiorenzo

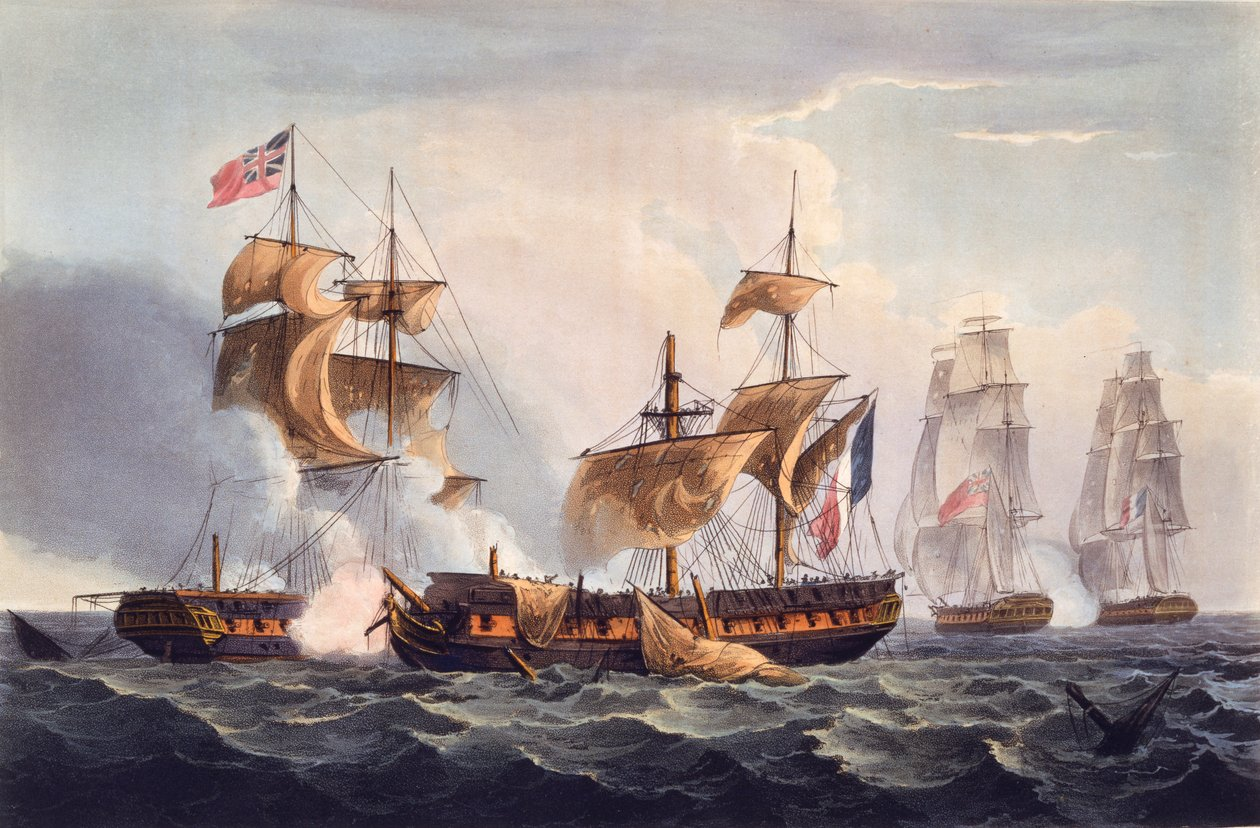
Minerve (1794)

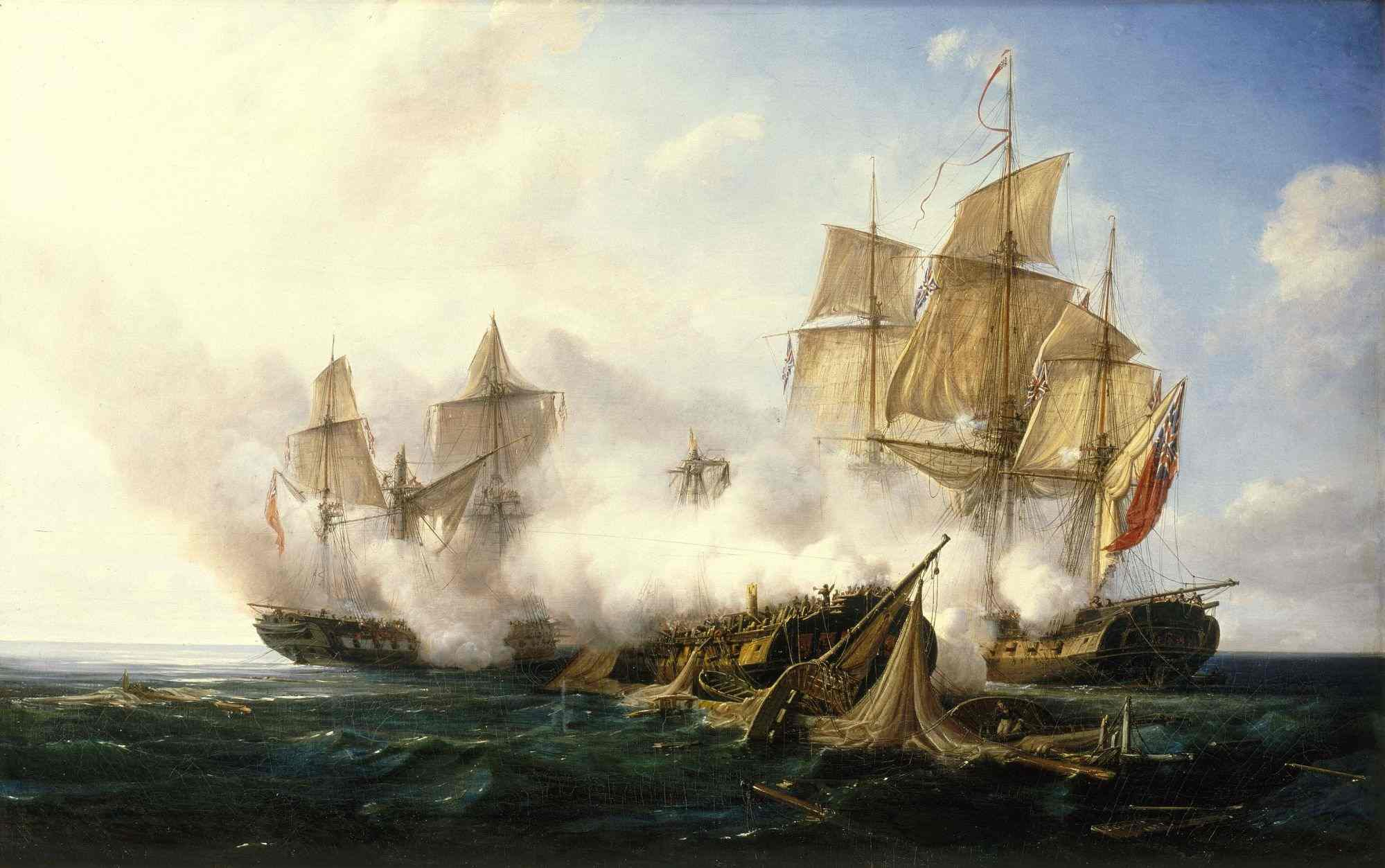
Minerve (1805)

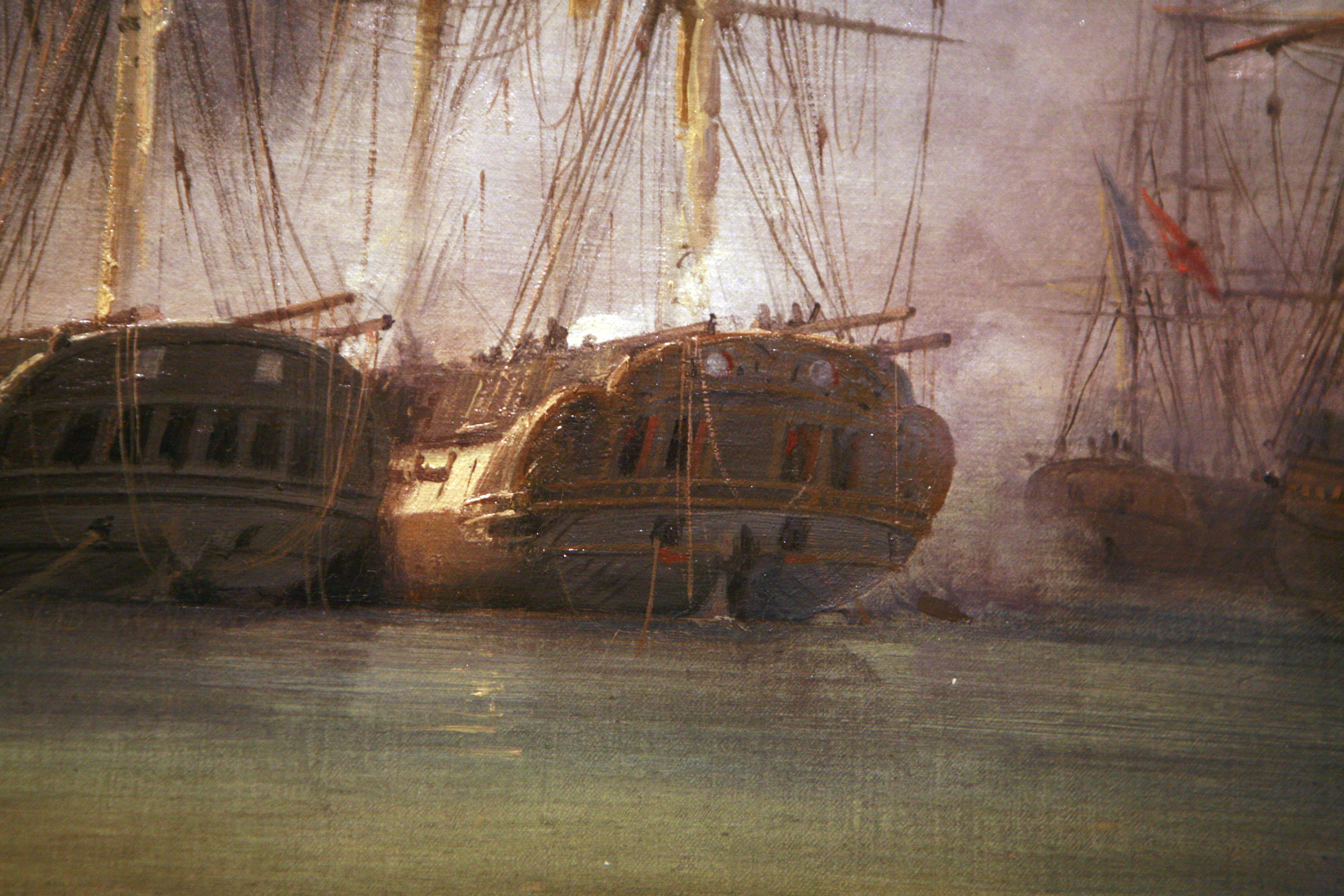
Minerve (1809)

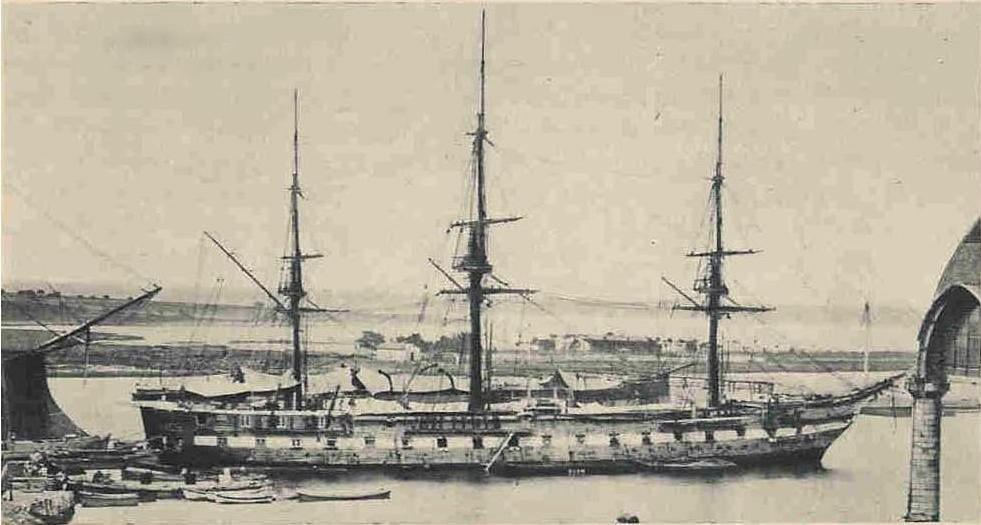
Minerve (1831)

== See also ==
- HMS Minerve
- Minerva (disambiguation)
- HMS Minerva

== Notes and references ==
=== Bibliography ===
- Roche, Jean-Michel (2005). Dictionnaire des bâtiments de la flotte de guerre française de Colbert à nos jours. Vol. 1. Group Retozel-Maury Millau. pp. 310–311. ISBN 978-2-9525917-0-6. OCLC 165892922.
- Roche, Jean-Michel (2005). Dictionnaire des bâtiments de la flotte de guerre française de Colbert à nos jours. Vol. 2. Group Retozel-Maury Millau. ISBN 978-2-9525917-0-6. OCLC 165892922.
