= Robert Barlow (Royal Navy officer) =

Royal Navy Admiral (1757–1843)

Admiral Sir Robert Barlow GCB
- Born: 25 December 1757; Covent Garden, London
- Died: 11 May 1843 (aged 85); Cadogan Place, Canterbury
- Military career
- Allegiance: United Kingdom
- Branch: Royal Navy
- Service years: 1770s to 1843
- Rank: Royal Navy Admiral
- Conflicts: American Revolutionary War; Capture of Minerve; Great Siege of Gibraltar; French Revolutionary Wars; Glorious First of June; Capture of Néréide; Capture of Africaine; Napoleonic Wars
- Awards: Knight Grand Cross of the Order of the Bath

Admiral Sir Robert Barlow GCB (25 December 1757 – 11 May 1843) was a senior and distinguished officer of the British Royal Navy who saw extensive service in the American Revolutionary War, the French Revolutionary Wars and the Napoleonic Wars. He made his name in small ship actions, especially fighting French frigates, of which he captured three. In his later career Barlow served as comptroller of the Navy and was influential at the Admiralty right up to his death. Although born to a middle-class family, Barlow and his siblings made names for themselves and two of Barlow's daughters married into the naval aristocracy. His grandson, Robert Barlow, was a first-class cricketer and army officer.

== Early career ==
Robert Barlow was born in 1757 in Covent Garden to wealthy mercer William Barlow and his wife Hilaire. The couple had numerous children, including Robert's elder brother George Hilario Barlow who later became Governor-General of India. Robert joined the Navy as a teenager and was promoted lieutenant in 1778, serving on HMS Courageux in the American Revolutionary War. In her, Barlow participated in the capture of the French frigate Minerve and also was part of the fleet which relieved the Great Siege of Gibraltar.

After the peace in 1783, Barlow married Elizabeth Garrett of Worting, Hampshire. The couple had a close relationship and numerous children. Between 1786 and 1789, Lieutenant Barlow commanded the revenue cutter HMS Barracouta. He was promoted to commander and transferred to the brig HMS Childers on the same service in November 1790.

== French Revolutionary Wars ==
On 2 January 1793, Barlow took Childers into Brest to reconnoitre the port due to the growing hostility between Britain and the First French Republic. Tensions had been mounting for months since the French Revolution and the opening of the French Revolutionary Wars the previous year between France, Prussia, Austria and Sardinia but Britain and France were not yet at war when Barlow entered Brest. Within minutes of his arrival, one of the formidable forts overlooking the harbour mouth opened fire on his diminutive craft with 48 lb shot. One of the first balls fired struck a gun on Childers deck and split the cannon in two. Barlow beat a hasty retreat without suffering any casualties and reported the attack to his superiors. One month later Britain and France were at war; in his excursion to Brest, Barlow had received the first shots of a 23-year conflict.

Two weeks after war was declared, Barlow secured an early victory with seizure of the privateer Patriote off Gravelines. This was the first naval engagement of the wars and his success secured Barlow a promotion to post captain in the frigate HMS Pegasus. Pegasus was attached to the Channel Fleet under Lord Howe and acted as a repeating ship for the admiral's signals. Barlow was still in this position at the battle of the Glorious First of June, when he relayed Howe's orders to the rest of the fleet. Despite a mixed reaction from many of Howe's captains the battle was a success and Barlow was upgraded to the frigate HMS Aquilon as a reward for his service.

In 1795, Barlow moved to the new frigate HMS Phoebe and in her captured the French frigate Néréide in December 1797. Four years later in the Straits of Gibraltar, Barlow repeated the feat by capturing the French frigate Africaine, which was transporting French soldiers to Egypt and had over 400 aboard, at the action of 19 February 1801. In a close contest, Phoebe forced her opponent to surrender and caused over 300 casualties to Africaine for just 13 of her own. For this second victory, Barlow was knighted and given command of the ship of the line HMS Triumph in the Mediterranean until 1804.

== Napoleonic Wars ==
The Napoleonic wars were a less active period for Barlow, who served as Lord Keith's flag captain for a time and then as deputy controller of the navy before moving as superintendent of Chatham Dockyard in 1808. During this period he showed great skill as an administrator and improved services where ever he was stationed.

Barlow continued on shore service until 1823, when he was retired as a rear-admiral. He had been made a Knight Commander of the Order of the Bath three years before. He was elected a Fellow of the Royal Society in January, 1819.

Barlow enjoyed a lengthy retirement in Canterbury and in 1840 was restored to naval service in order to receive a belated promotion to full admiral and advancement to Knight Grand Cross. He died at the Archbishop's Palace in Canterbury in May 1843. His wife had predeceased him by 26 years, but two of his daughters had married well, wedding George Byng, 6th Viscount Torrington and William Nelson, 1st Earl Nelson.
