= Robert Barlow (cricketer) =

English cricketer and British Army officer

Personal information
- Full name: Robert Adeane Barlow
- Born: 12 February 1827; Canterbury, Kent, England
- Died: 28 September 1907 (aged 80); Enfield, Middlesex, England
- Batting: Unknown

Career statistics
Competition	First-class
Matches	1
Runs scored	0
Batting average	0.00
100s/50s	–/–
Top score	0
Catches/stumpings	–/–
- Source: Cricinfo, 25 December 2019

Robert Adeane Barlow (12 February 1827 – 29 September 1907) was an English first-class cricketer and British Army officer.

The son of the Reverend William Barlow (son of Admiral Robert Barlow) and Louisa Adeane, he was born at Canterbury in February 1827. He was educated at Rugby School, before going up to St John's College, Cambridge. After graduating from Cambridge, Barlow travelled to Brazil where he visited Pernambuco, Bahia and Rio de Janeiro and the Saint John d'El Rey Mining Company in order to learn about the language and trade of Brazil. After returning to England, Barlow joined the Duke of Lancaster's Own Yeomanry as a lieutenant in October 1852. In the same year he played first-class cricket for Manchester against the Marylebone Cricket Club at Lord's. He was dismissed without scoring in both innings by James Grundy. He was later promoted to captain in February 1860.

Barlow travelled to the subcontinent in 1863, visiting India and Ceylon, before travelling to Burma to obtain a concession for a railway through Burma to China. By his own later account, he was introduced to the Burmese king, Mindon Min, who took an instant liking to him. According to Barlow, he was then appointed as the commander-in-chief of the Burmese army and made the Secretary of State for Foreign Affairs. After leaving Burma, he travelled to Abyssinia where he claimed to have become a major general in the Abyssinian Army. What is certain was his presence in Egypt in 1877, where he was captured and imprisoned by the Mahdist forces after landing on the Egyptian coast on a dhow which flew the Ottoman flag. His imprisonment raised questions in the Parliament of the United Kingdom regarding his treatment at the hands of the Mahdists. He later tried to accompany General Gordon on his ill-fated journey to Khartoum in 1885, but he was refused.

Upon his return to England, Barlow's fortunes began to decline and he was declared bankrupt for the second time since 1867. He entered the Enfield Workhouse Infirmary in 1895, where he was to spend the remainder of his life in an apparent state of fantasy. Barlow was married to Elizabeth Isabella Haworth, with the couple having two children, however, it appears his financial troubles lead to the breakup of his family. While in the infirmary, he claimed to have fathered a Princess Clovis Bonaparte, the daughter-in-law of Prince Jerome Bonaparte. Barlow died at the infirmary in September 1907.
