= HMS Minerva =

Eight vessels of the British Royal Navy have been named HMS Minerva, after the goddess Minerva of Roman mythology.

- HMS Minerva (1759) was a 32-gun fifth rate launched in 1759, captured by the French in 1778, recaptured in 1781 and renamed HMS Recovery. She was sold in 1784.
- HMS Minerva (1780) was a 38-gun fifth rate launched in 1780, converted to troopship Pallas in 1798, and broken up 1803.
- HMS Minerva (1781) was a 29-gun storeship purchased in 1781 and sold 1783.
- HMS Minerva (1805) was a 32-gun fifth rate launched in 1805 and broken up 1815.
- HMS Minerva (1820) was a 46-gun fifth rate launched in 1820, sent to harbour service 1861, and sold 1895.
- HMS Minerva (1895) was an Eclipse-class protected cruiser launched in 1895 and sold in 1920.
- HMS Minerva (1925) was the monitor HMS M33, built in 1915, converted to a coastal minelayer and renamed in 1925, renamed as a boom defence workshop C23(M), and as hulk C23 in 1946, and later known as RMAS Minerva.
- HMS Minerva (F45) was a Leander-class frigate launched in 1964 and sold for scrap in 1993.

== See also ==
- Minerva (disambiguation)
- HMS Minerve
- French ship Minerve
