= Minerva (1805 ship) =

British merchant and convict vessel (1805–1826)

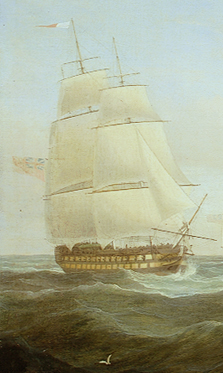
- Minerva

History

United Kingdom
- Name: Minerva
- Namesake: Minerva
- Owner: Stuart Donaldson
- Builder: Brocklebank, Lancaster
- Launched: 1805
- Fate: Broken up 1826

General characteristics
- Tons burthen: 530, or 534, or 53426/94, or 551 (bm)
- Length: Overall: 124 ft 6 in (37.9 m); Keel: 100 ft 2 in (30.5 m)
- Beam: 31 ft 8 in (9.7 m)
- Depth of hold: 17 ft 9 in (5.4 m)
- Complement: 1806–1808:35; 1810:30; 1811:50
- Armament: 1806–1808:22 × 18&9&6-pounder guns; 1809:4 × 9 + 2 × 6-pounder guns + 16 × 18-pounder carronades; 1810:16 × 6&18-pounder guns; 1811:2 × 9-pdr guns + 14 × 18-pounder carronades
- Notes: Two decks

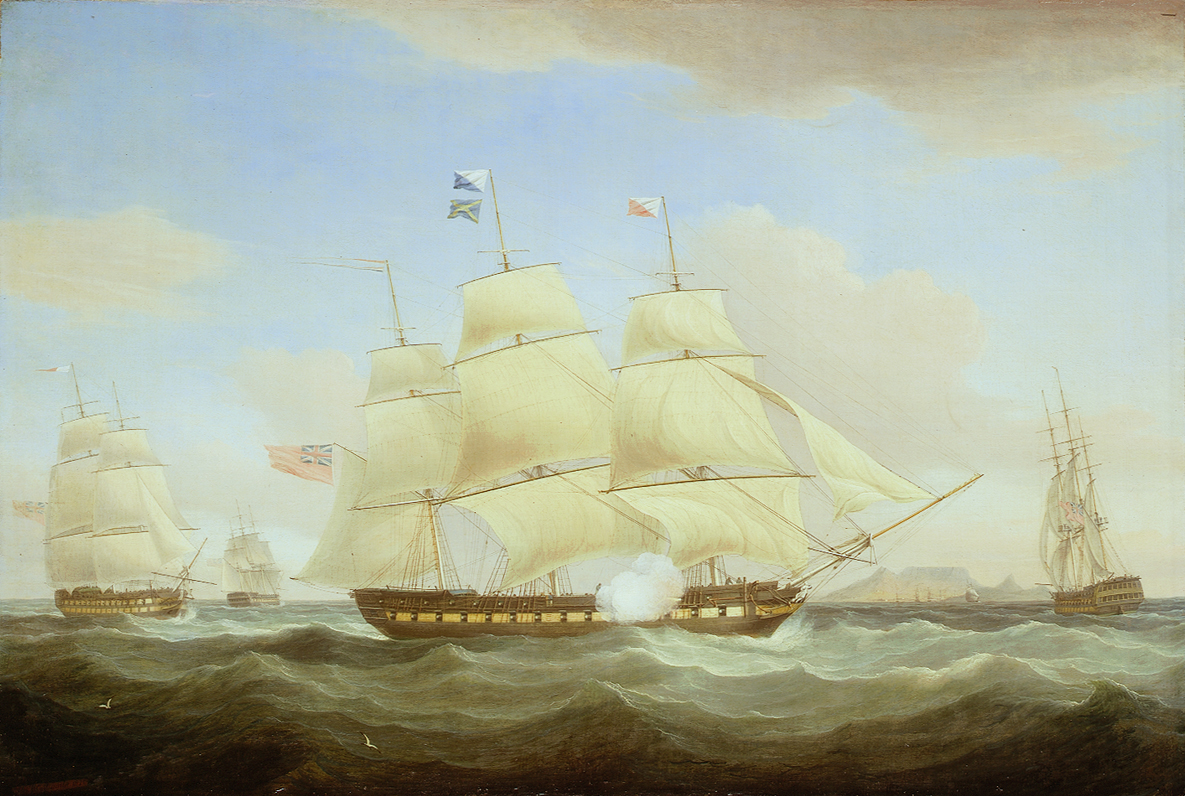
Indiamen Minerva, Scaleby Castle, and Charles Grant in 1820, by Thomas Whitcombe

Minerva was launched at Lancaster, Lancashire, in 1805. Following trading with Central and South America, she made two voyages under charter to the British East India Company (EIC) between 1811 and 1814. She also made four voyages transporting convicts to Australia between 1818 and 1824, one to Van Diemen's Land and three voyages to New South Wales. She was broken up in 1826.

== Career ==
Minerva began her career as a West Indiaman. She served under a sequence of masters. She entered Lloyd's Register in 1805. In 1806 her master was M'Kinley, her owner was Richies, and her trade was Lancaster–West Indies. Captain John McKinlay acquired a letter of marque on 26 February 1806. In subsequent years she continued to trade with Suriname. Letters of marque were issued for captains Thomas Alexander (14 May 1807), Lewis Williams (29 January 1808), Thomas Alexander (30 September 1808), and Godfrey Gunhouse (19 June 1810). The Register of Shipping for 1809 showed L. Williams, master, Richies & Son, owners, and trade London–Suriname. Godfrey Gunhouse acquired a letter of marque on 19 June 1810, and sailed Minerva to Honduras.

=== EIC voyages ===
In 1811 the EIC had Minerva measured and inspected prior to chartering her. She also underwent a large repair. On 20 February 1811, the EIC accepted a tender from John Anderson for Minerva for one voyage at a rate of £31 54s per ton for 534 tons.

EIC voyage #1 (1811–1812): On 22 May 1811 Captain John Anderson acquired a letter of marque. He sailed from Portsmouth on 21 June 1811, bound for Bengal. Minerva reached Madeira on 2 July and arrived at Calcutta on 1 November. Homeward bound, she was at Saugor on 27 December and Bencoolen on 25 January 1812. She reached St Helena on 12 May, and arrived at The Downs on 22 July.

On 2 December 1812, the EIC accepted a tender from Stuart Donaldson for Minerva for one voyage at a rate of £26 15s per ton for 534 tons.

EIC voyage #2 (1813–1814): Captain Anderson sailed from Portsmouth on 2 June 1813, bound for Bengal. Minerva reached Madeira on 22 June and arrived at Calcutta on 12 November. Homeward bound, she was at Saugor on 17 February 1814 and Tellicherry on 24 April. She reached St Helena on 7 July, and arrived at The Downs on 21 September.

In 1815 Minerva was sold to Sandle & Co., London, and placed on the regular run to Quebec.

| Year | Master | Owner | Trade | Source |
|---|---|---|---|---|
| 1815 | Anderson | Donalson | London–India | Register of Shipping (RS) |
| 1816 | J. Mackie | Donalson | London–Quebec | RS |

On 23 February 1816, Minerva, James Mackie, master, arrived at the Cape of Good Hope from Quebec. She was carrying timber, slaves and coals". She sailed from the Cape on 11 May. It is not clear where she acquired captives. She sailed on to Mauritius, and from there back to London.

=== Convict transport ===
| Year | Master | Owner | Trade | Source |
|---|---|---|---|---|
| 1818 | J. Bell | Donalson | London–Botany Bay | RS |

Captain John Bell made four voyages transporting convicts.

Convict voyage #1 (1818): Minerva sailed from Cork on 1 January 1818 and arrived at Port Jackson on 30 April. She then sailed on to Hobart Town, where she arrived on 7 June. She had embarked 160 male convicts; three were left in Port Jackson and the remaining 157 were transported on to Hobart Town, where they arrived on 7 June 1818. There were no deaths aboard the vessel.

Convict voyage #2 (1819): Minerva sailed from Cork on 26 August 1819 and arrived at Port Jackson on 17 December. She had embarked 172 male convicts from Cork to Sydney and suffered one death en route.

Convict voyage #3 (1821): Minerva sailed from Sheerness on 1 August 1821 and arrived at Port Jackson on 16 December. She had embarked 172 male convicts and suffered three deaths en route.

In May 1821 she arrived back at the Downs. In January 1822 Lloyd's List reported that on 14 December Minerva, Bell, master, had been driven out of Aberdeen Bay and had taken refuge at Long Hope, where she found 15 vessels detained by contrary winds.

In 1822 Minerva sailed from Leith to Australia again. On 1 July 1823 Lloyd's List reported that Minerva, Bell, master, had been taking in a cargo at Bengal on 14 February for her homeward journey. She had undergone repairs there, having lost her false keel and sustained other damage when she hit a sunken rock off "the Nicobar". Then on 11 November Lloyd's List passed on a report that Minerva, Bell, master, on her way from New South Wales, had put into Valparaiso in distress and had been condemned there. This was most likely Minerva, of 258 tons (bm), launched at Aberdeen; alternatively, the report was in error, or Minerva underwent repairs.

Convict voyage #4 (1824): Minerva sailed from London on 14 July 1824 and arrived at Port Jackson on 19 November 1824. She had embarked 172 male convicts and suffered two deaths en route.

== Fate ==
On 2 December 1826 her owners cancelled Minerva's registration as her demolition had been completed.
