= Action of 19 February 1801 =

Minor naval engagement during the French Revolutionary Wars

Coordinates: 35.922°N 5.311°W

- Part of the French Revolutionary Wars
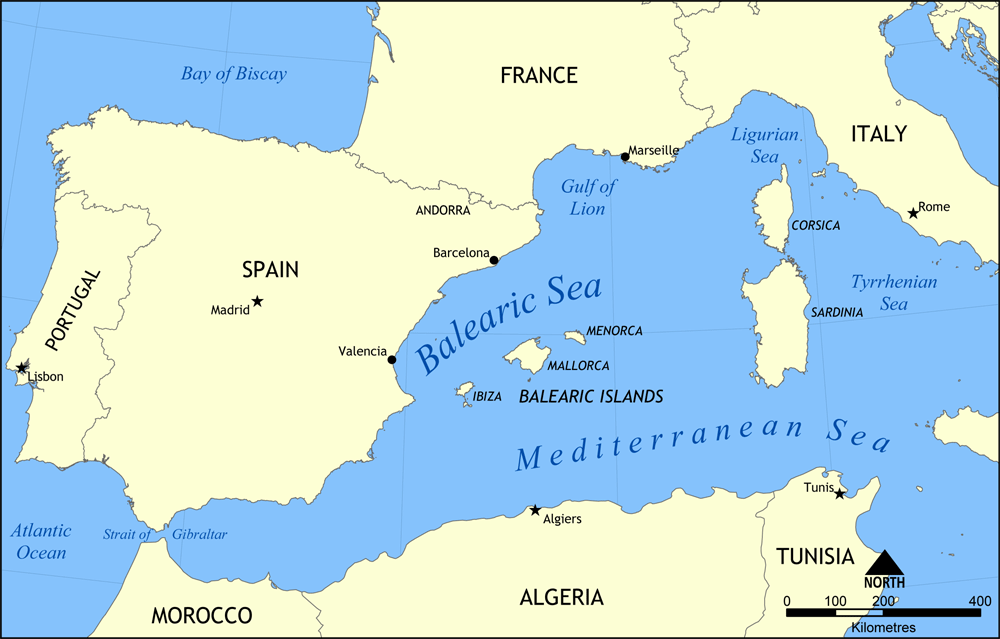
- Location of the start of the action of19 February 1801
Date	19 February 1801
Location	Off Ceuta, Spanish North Africa
Result	British victory

Belligerents
United Kingdom	French Republic

Commanders and leaders
Captain Robert Barlow	Commodore Saulnier †

Strength
Frigate HMS Phoebe	Frigate Africaine

Casualties and losses
1 killed, 12 wounded	200 killed, 143 wounded, Africaine captured

The action of 19 February 1801 was a minor naval battle fought off Ceuta in Spanish North Africa in February 1801 between frigates of the French and Royal Navies during the French Revolutionary Wars. The engagement formed part of a series of actions fought to prevent the French from resupplying their garrison in Egypt, which had been trapped there without significant reinforcement since the defeat of the French Mediterranean Fleet at the Battle of the Nile two and a half years earlier. The leader of the Egyptian expedition, General Napoleon Bonaparte, had returned to France in 1799 and promised aid to the troops left behind, prompting several expeditions to the region carrying reinforcements.

The frigate Africaine had been sent from Rochefort early in 1801 with more than 400 soldiers for the Egyptian garrison, and by February had reached the Mediterranean Sea, Commodore Saulnier seeking to pass along the North African coast to avoid patrolling Royal Navy warships. On the afternoon of 19 February however the overladen French warship was discovered by the British HMS Phoebe and rapidly chased down and brought to action. In an engagement lasting two hours, the French ship was reduced to a wallowing wreck as broadsides from Phoebe tore through the hull, rigging and the soldiers packed on the decks: by the time Africaine surrendered, 200 men were dead and another 143 wounded. The captured ship was brought into the base at Mahón in Menorca and subsequently served in the Royal Navy.

== Background ==
In 1798 a large French expeditionary force under General Napoleon Bonaparte invaded Egypt, then under the nominal control of the Ottoman Empire, in an extension of the ongoing French Revolutionary Wars. The fleet that had convoyed the French army was anchored in Aboukir Bay near Alexandria, and was discovered there by a British fleet under Vice-Admiral Sir Horatio Nelson on 1 August. In the ensuing Battle of the Nile the French Mediterranean Fleet was almost totally destroyed, preventing the French forces in Egypt from maintaining regular reinforcement and communication from France and ending the possibility of a wholesale evacuation of the French army. Following an unsuccessful campaign in Syria, Bonaparte returned to France without his army, eventually seizing control of the French government during the events of 18 Brumaire.

By 1801, the troops in Egypt were in an increasingly desperate situation: supplies were low, reinforcement from France almost non-existent and disease was rife. In addition they were subject to constant attack by Ottoman and irregular Egyptian forces, culminating in the assassination of General Jean Baptiste Kléber. Bonaparte, conscious of his promises to send reinforcements to the beleaguered army in Egypt, planned a series of expeditions to the region to restore morale and numbers to the expeditionary force, drawn from troops and naval units available on the French Atlantic coast. The largest force consisted of 5,000 soldiers and nine ships under Rear-Admiral Honoré Ganteaume and sailed from Brest in January 1801, but this squadron had been preceded by two frigates from Rochefort, Africaine and Régénérée.

Each of the frigates carried, in addition to their regular complement, approximately 400 soldiers and large quantities of muskets, cannon and ammunition to reinforce the Egyptian garrison. The ships had an uneventful passage southwards, separating before entering the Mediterranean and taking different routes towards Egypt. Africaine, under the command of Commodore Saulnier who had previously fought at the Nile and in the action of 31 March 1800 as captain of the ship of the line Guillaume Tell, had elected to travel along the North African coast to avoid British patrols in open waters, and by 19 February was passing the Spanish North African town of Ceuta, 6 nautical miles (11 km) east of Gibraltar. Africaine was a large modern 40-gun frigate with 715 men aboard but the huge quantity of supplies made the vessel slow and unresponsive and vulnerable to attack by a more agile opponent. Also sailing off Ceuta on the afternoon of 19 February was the 36-gun British frigate HMS Phoebe under the command of Captain Robert Barlow. Phoebe, carrying 239 men aboard (22 below the required complement), was operating from the British base at Mahón on Menorca on a routine patrol between there and Gibraltar, and had just passed Ceuta to the south on the last leg of the journey when at 16:00 the lookout sighted Africaine.

== Battle ==
Barlow immediately turned to investigate the strange sail, steering southwards directly at the lumbering vessel. Saulnier was seemingly unwilling to attempt any manoeuvre in the face of the enemy, as Africaine continued to hold the original course without deviation. By 19:30 it was inevitable that Phoebe would intercept Africaine and Saulnier shortened sail, slowing his frigate to meet the threat. Barlow was still unsure of the identity of the stranger and fired a shot over Africaine as a warning to its captain to identify his ship. Saulnier responded by turning to port and firing a broadside directly at Phoebe. It was poorly aimed however and mostly scattered into the sea without effect. At this, Barlow pulled Phoebe into a parallel position to Africaine and unleashed a much more devastating broadside from close range. The two frigates then began an exchange of fire at close range.

The effect of Phoebe's broadsides on the overladen French frigate were disastrous: for two hours Africaine limped northwards with Phoebe pouring fire into the French ship without significant reply. Even as they were cut down by cannon fire, French soldiers continued to climb out of the hold and join the combat on deck, their musketry useless at the range between the ships and the press of bodies obstructing the French sailors from working their guns effectively. Saulnier was killed, Général de division Edme Desfourneaux badly wounded and many of their subordinates including all of the naval lieutenants, made casualties; almost all of the rigging had been torn away, most of the guns smashed from their mounts and the decks literally heaped with dead bodies. Even the orlop, usually the safest part of a ship and therefore where the ships medical facilities were located, came under heavy fire and three surgeons were killed while standing at the operating table. Eventually the senior surviving officer, Captain Jean-Jacques Magendie, who had suffered a severe head wound, authorised the colours to be struck at 21:30, approximately 60 nautical miles (110 km) east of Gibraltar, thereby surrendering the ship. Phoebe by contrast was only lightly damaged, with the principle injury being to the masts: both ships might have been dismasted had there been any strong wind rather than a deep calm during the evening. Only one man, Seaman Samuel Hayes, had been killed and just 12 wounded including the first lieutenant.

== Aftermath ==
Barlow took possession of the battered French vessel and set his men to making hasty repairs before the weather could worsen. The first task was dealing with the dead and wounded on the French ship: Magadie reported in the immediate aftermath that 200 men had been killed and 143 were seriously wounded or dying, figures that Barlow considered to be understated. When repairs were complete, Barlow turned his ships towards nearby Gibraltar, but in the face of a westerly breeze progress was slow and after fours days he abandoned the attempt and turned back to Menorca, concerned for the state of the wounded men and the large number of prisoners of war aboard both vessels. However, the wind dropped when the ships were off the Southern coast of Mallorca and Phoebe and Africaine did not reach Mahón until 5 March. The action was highly praised by the station commander Captain Manley Dixon, who stated in a letter to the Admiralty dated 10 March 1801 "that more Skill or effective Gunnery were never displayed in any Combat than in the present Instance".

Barlow was subsequently knighted for his success, and moved from Phoebe to the frigate HMS Concorde, a highly desirable warship noted for its speed, before moving to the ship of the line HMS Triumph later in the year. His wounded first lieutenant, John Wentworth Holland, was promoted to commander and the other officers and the enlisted men were all highly praised in the official dispatch. Africaine was purchased by the Royal Navy and briefly renamed Amelia before reverting to Africaine. The ship had a long career in British service during the Napoleonic Wars, participating in numerous actions including the controversial Action of 13 September 1810 during the Mauritius campaign. Nearly five decades later the battle was among the actions recognised by the clasp "PHOEBE 19 FEBY. 1801", attached to the Naval General Service Medal which was awarded upon application to all British participants from Phoebe still living in 1847. Régénérée had an uninterrupted passage to Egypt, arriving on 1 March, one day before the British Expeditionary Force initiated a close blockade of the coast. Régénérée proved to be the only major French warship to reach the garrison after Ganteaume's squadron was repeatedly driven back in its efforts. Without supplies and reinforcements the French army in Egypt could not effectively resist the major British invasion of the country in March 1801 and after a brief campaign was forced to capitulate at Alexandria in August.

Historical analysis of the battle has praised Barlow's conduct: his tactics of refusing to allow the French ship to come alongside and board his vessel, thereby turning the French superiority in numbers into a disadvantage was commended by William James, and historian Tom Wareham has noted that the standing British practice of firing into enemy hulls rather than at the rigging as practiced by the French gave Barlow an advantage against the crowded decks of Africaine. Saulnier too has been praised for his efforts to avoid combat with his ship so overladen and for the subsequent valour with which his crew and their passengers fought so fiercely for two hours against mounting odds and in the face of "truly dreadful" casualties, although he was also subject to criticism in France when it emerged that he had removed the quoins from his guns in an effort to force his men to fire at the British rigging rather than the hull: Bonaparte ordered that in future his ships intended "not to dismast the enemy, but to do him as much harm as possible."

== Bibliography ==
- Clowes, William Laird (1997) [1900]. The Royal Navy, A History from the Earliest Times to 1900, Volume IV. London: Chatham Publishing. ISBN 1-86176-013-2.
- Gardiner, Robert, ed. (2001) [1996]. Nelson Against Napoleon. London: Caxton Editions. ISBN 1-86176-026-4.
- James, William (2002) [1827]. The Naval History of Great Britain, Volume 3, 1800–1805. London: Conway Maritime Press. ISBN 0-85177-907-7.
- Wareham, Tom (2001). The Star Captains, Frigate Command in the Napoleonic Wars. London: Chatham Publishing. ISBN 1-86176-169-4.
- Woodman, Richard (2001). The Sea Warriors. London: Constable Publishers. ISBN 1-84119-183-3.
