= Edme Étienne Borne Desfourneaux =

French Army General and Governor of Guadalope

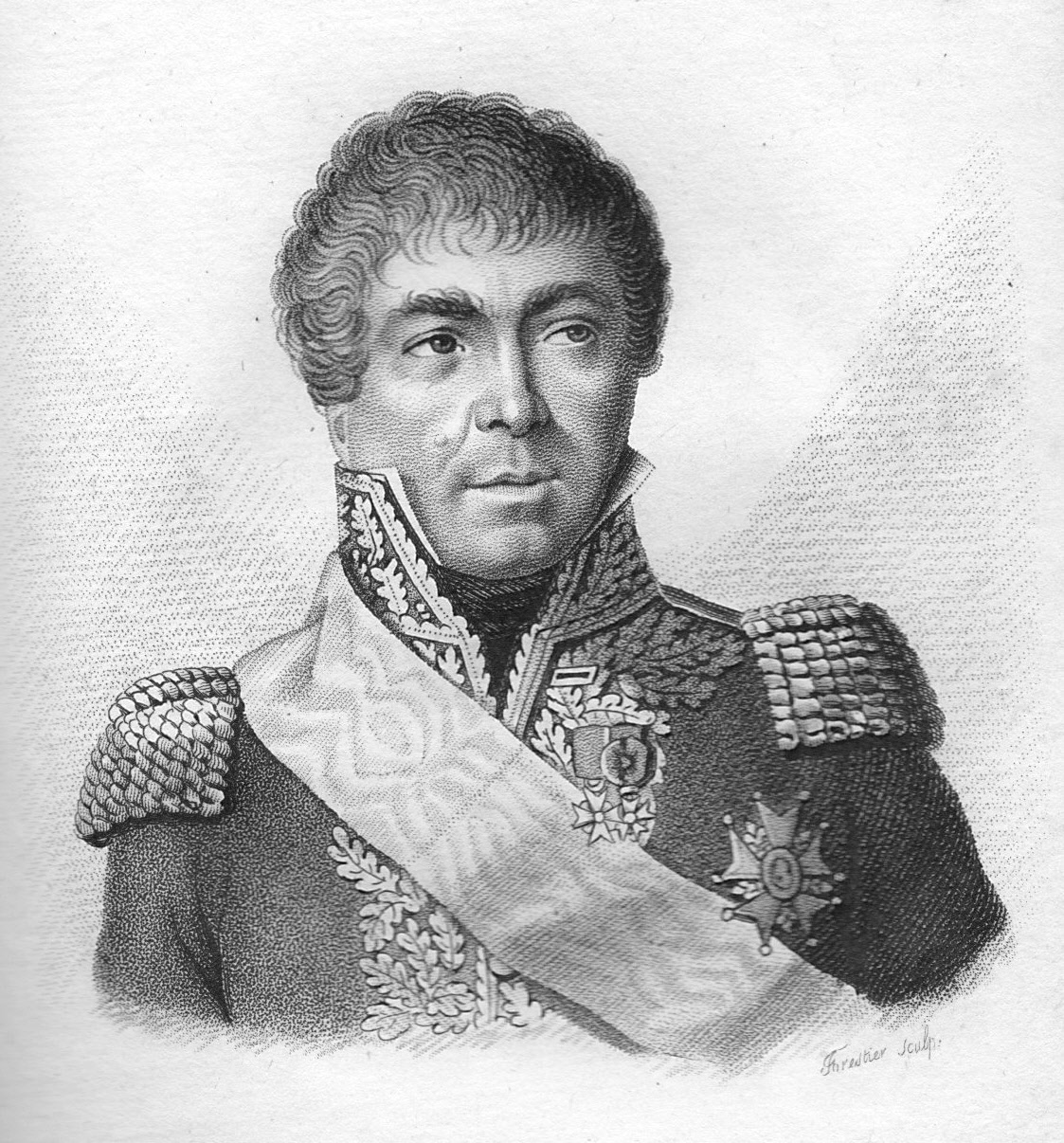
Edme Étienne Borne Desfourneaux.

Edme-Étienne Borne, comte Desfourneaux (French pronunciation: [ɛdmə etjɛn bɔʁn defuʁno]; 22 April 1767 in Vézelay – 22 February 1849 in Paris) was a French Army General and Governor of Guadalope.

== Life ==
Desfourneaux was born in Vézelay and joined the French Army of the Kingdom of France as sergeant in 1789 with the Régiment de Conti during the French Revolution. He later rose to the rank of lieutenant colonel in the 48e Régiment d'Infanterie in Saint-Domingue in 1792. From 1798 to 1799, he served as Governor of Guadeloupe.

He was gravely wounded at the action of 19 February 1801. Desfourneaux received many honours for his service, including:

- Commander of the Legion of Honour in 1804
- Order of Saint Louis 1814

== Politics ==
In 1811 he became a member of the Corps législatif of the First French Empire and served as Vice-President of the body. He also served as a member of the Chamber of Representatives in 1815 during the Hundred Days.

He briefly returned to command troops during the Bourbon Restoration.

Following the Bourbon Restoration, he retired from public life and died in Paris in 1849.

== Sources ==
- Mullié, Charles (1852). "Borne Desfourneaux (Edme-Étienne)" . Biographie des célébrités militaires des armées de terre et de mer de 1789 à 1850 (in French). Paris: Poignavant et Compagnie.
