= USS LST-314 =

LST-1-class landing ship tank

Coordinates: 49.7166667°N 0.8666667°W

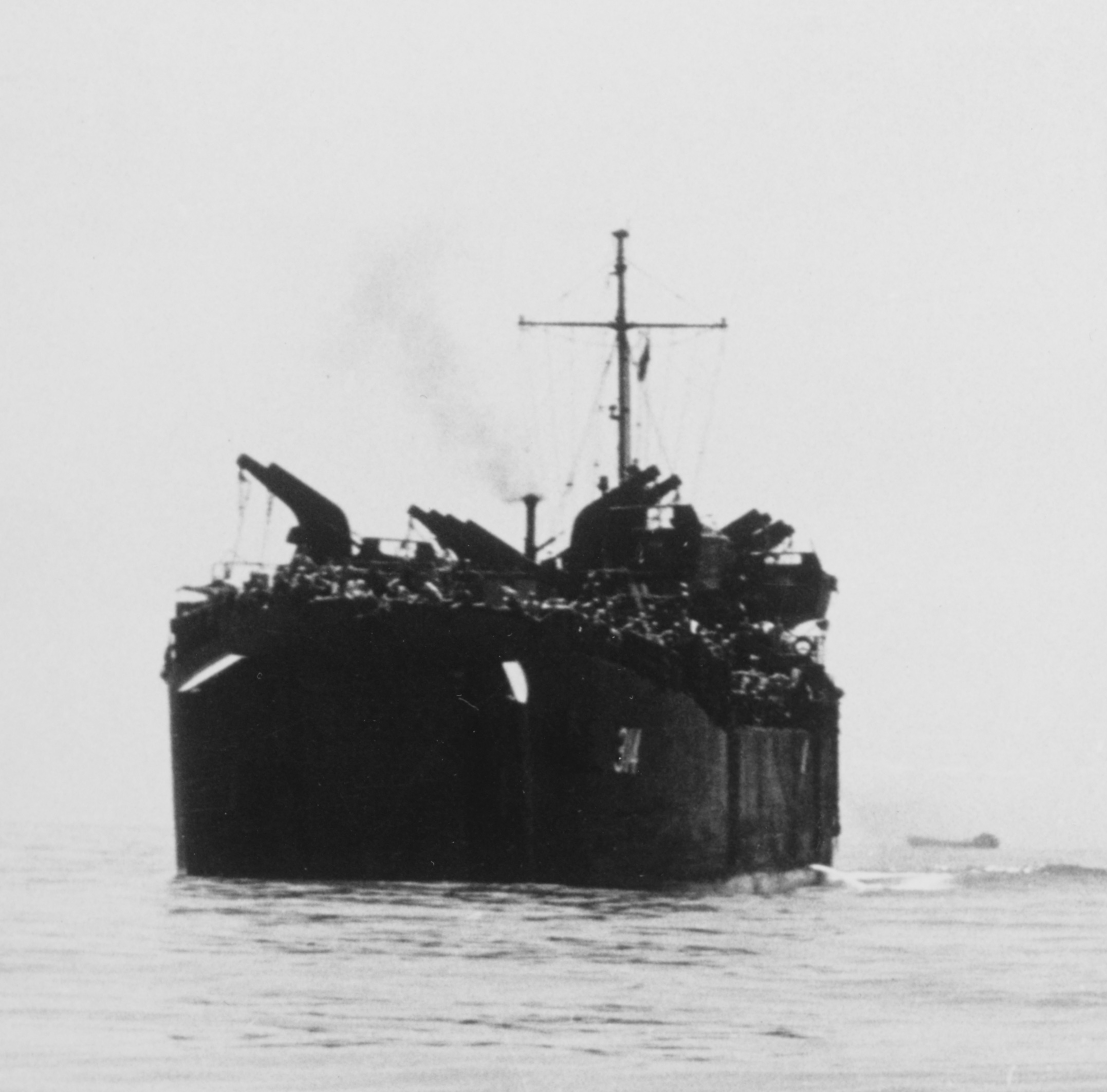
- USS LST-314 off Sicily in 1944

History

United States
- Name: LST-314
- Builder: New York Navy Yard, Brooklyn
- Laid down: 7 September 1942
- Launched: 30 December 1942
- Sponsored by: Mrs. Gertrude F. Holmes
- Commissioned: 15 January 1943
- Stricken: 22 August 1944
- Identification: Callsign: NYCB
- Honors and awards: See Awards
- Fate: Sunk by torpedo, 9 June 1944

General characteristics
- Class & type: LST-1-class tank landing ship
- Displacement: 4,080 long tons (4,145 t) full load; 2,160 long tons (2,190 t) landing
- Length: 328 ft (100 m) oa
- Beam: 50 ft (15 m)
- Draft: Full load: 8 ft 2 in (2.49 m) forward; 14 ft 1 in (4.29 m) aft; Landing at 2,160 t: 3 ft 11 in (1.19 m) forward; 9 ft 10 in (3.00 m) aft
- Installed power: 2 × 900 hp (670 kW) Electro-Motive Diesel 12-567A diesel engines; 1,700 shp (1,300 kW)
- Propulsion: 1 × Falk main reduction gears; 2 × Propellers
- Speed: 12 kn (22 km/h; 14 mph)
- Range: 24,000 nmi (44,000 km; 28,000 mi) at 9 kn (17 km/h; 10 mph) while displacing 3,960 long tons (4,024 t)
- Boats & landing craft carried: 2 or 6 x LCVPs
- Capacity: 2,100 tons oceangoing maximum; 350 tons main deckload
- Troops: 16 officers, 147 enlisted men
- Complement: 13 officers, 104 enlisted men
- Armament: Varied, ultimate armament; 2 × twin 40 mm (1.57 in) Bofors guns; 4 × single 40 mm Bofors guns; 12 × 20 mm (0.79 in) Oerlikon cannons

USS LST-314 was a LST-1-class tank landing ship in the United States Navy during World War II.

== Construction and career ==
LST-314 was laid down on 7 September 1942 at New York Navy Yard, Brooklyn, New York. Launched on 30 December 1942 and commissioned on 15 January 1943.

During World War II, LST-314 was assigned to the Europe-Africa-Middle theater. She took part in the Invasion of Sicily from 9 to 15 July 1943 and the Salerno landings from 9 to 21 September later that year.

She took part in the Invasion of Normandy from 6 June until her fate. On 9 June 1944, she was struck by a torpedo in the Seine Bay while being attacked by the German motor torpedo boats S 172, S 174, S 175 and S 187 and sank with 67 officers and sailors.

Two men who served aboard LST 314 were cited for heroism and awarded the Silver Star Medal. Lt. (jg) Fred B. Smith Jr. was the small boat officer during the Salerno landings. Lt. Commander Alvin H. Tutt was the Captain of LST 314 and was cited for his heroism that saved the lives of many of his sailors during the sinking of the ship during the Normandy Campaign.

LST 314 earned 3 battle stars for her galant service during World War II.

LST-314 was struck from the Navy Register on 22 August 1944.

== Gallery ==
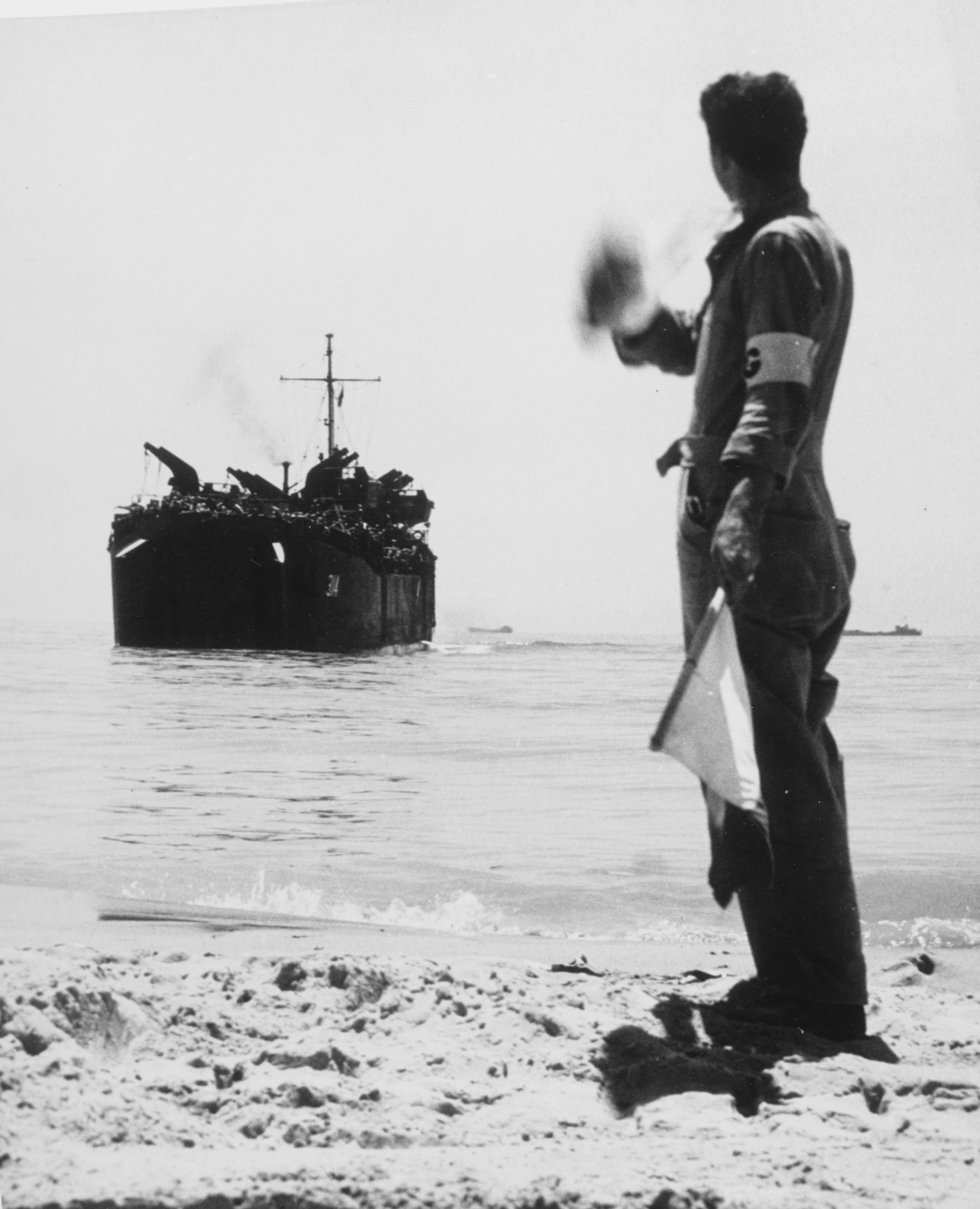
USS LST-314 taking part in Operation Husky in 1943

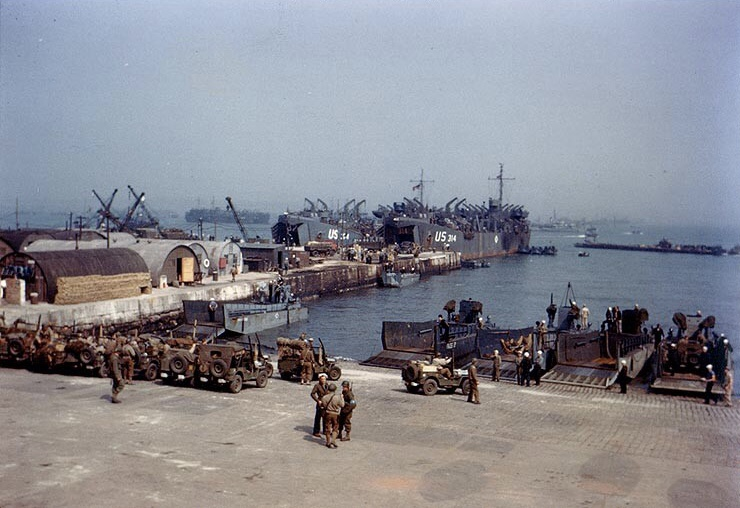
USS LST-314 alongside USS LST-374 undergoing preparation for the Normandy invasion in 1944

== Awards ==
LST-314 have earned the following awards:

- American Campaign Medal
- Combat Action Ribbon
- European-Africa-Middle East Campaign Medal (3 battle stars)
- World War II Victory Medal

== Sources ==
- United States. Dept. of the Treasury (1962). Treasury Decisions Under the Customs, Internal Revenue, Industrial Alcohol, Narcotic and Other Laws, Volume 97. U.S. Government Printing Office.
- Moore, Capt. John (1984). Jane's Fighting Ships 1984-85. Jane's Information Group. ISBN 978-0710607959.
- Saunders, Stephen (2009). Jane's Fighting Ships 2009-2010. Jane's Information Group. ISBN 978-0710628886.
- Fairplay International Shipping Journal Volume 222. United Kingdom: Fairplay Publishing Limited. 1967.
