= Karen Karbo =

American author

- Born: Detroit, Michigan, U.S.
- Education: University of Southern California
- Writing career
- Genres: Non-fiction, fiction, biography, journalism, children's books
- Notable awards: National Endowment for the Arts, Oregon Book Award, General Electric Younger Writer Award
- Website: Karen Karbo

Karen Karbo is an American novelist, non-fiction writer and journalist.

Karbo's three comic novels, Trespassers Welcome Here (1990), The Diamond Lane (1993), and Motherhood Made a Man Out of Me (2001), were each named New York Times Notable Books. She may be best known for her "Kick Ass Women" series (2007–13)—biographical self-help guidebooks on Katharine Hepburn Coco Chanel, Georgia O'Keeffe, and Julia Child. Her other non-fiction works are Generation Ex: Tales From The Second Wives Club (2001), The Stuff of Life: A Daughter's Memoir (2004), In Praise of Difficult Women (2018), and Yeah, No. Not Happening (2020). She has also written the three-book Minerva Clark children's mystery series (2005–7).

Karbo has received an Oregon Book Award and a National Endowment for the Arts Fellowship in fiction, among other recognition. She has written essays, articles and reviews for Elle, Esquire, The New York Times, O, Outside, Salon.com, Vogue, and other magazines. New York Times critic Janet Burroway described her books as "praised for their laugh-aloud, zinging, elbow-in-the-side wit," and her magazine work as in the tradition of participatory journalism writers such as George Plimpton or Bob Shacochis. Karbo lives in the south of France after previously residing in Portland, Oregon and Los Angeles.

== Fiction works ==
=== Novels ===
Karbo's novels often draw on personal experiences—in college and the film industry, and with marriage, mortality and motherhood. Her first, Trespassers Welcome Here (1990, Village Voice Top Ten Book of the Year), tapped into her work in the USC Russian department to explore life in the West for a group of Russian emigres in a university Slavic languages department: a quartet of unrelated teaching assistants dubbed the "Lenin Sisters" and a famed author and teacher. The New York Times noted its abundant humor ranging from near-slapstick to wry wit, ear for the Russian accent, and deep sense of the transplanted Soviet psyche, describing it as "a novel about the pursuit of possibilities," whose unfolding first-person chapters both harmonize and generate surprising plots.

Her second novel, The Diamond Lane (1991), centers on two sisters juggling troubled but comical love lives and contrasting dreams of success. Library Journal called it "a deft, tragicomic social satire … noteworthy for the complexity of its characters, crisp prose, and loopy comic style"; Los Angeles Times critic Judith Freeman wrote that it tackles two "notoriously fickle institutions requiring blind hope to sustain life"—Hollywood and marriage—with astringent humor. In 2014, librarian Nancy Pearl named the book as a favorite and one of her "under-the-radar reads" on National Public Radio.

Karbo's third novel, Motherhood Made a Man Out Of Me (2000), takes on the contradictory and heightened emotional states of new motherhood, through intertwined plots involving a married couple with a newborn and the woman's best friend, a pregnant gardener engaged to marry a man she finds out is already married. New York Times reviewer Ann Hodgman called it "peevishly hilarious," with thick layers of domestic detail, plot and characters portraying "the squalor and hatred that bubble under the surface of every marriage with a new baby."

=== Minerva Clark books ===
In the 2000s, Karbo ventured into children's books seeking to entertain her fifth-grade daughter, Fiona, with something exciting and modern after she grew tired of Harry Potter. She created a Portland-based, technology-savvy, 13-year-old sleuth, Minerva Clark, who survives an electrocution accident, leaving her purged of self-consciousness and with a fearlessness suited to crime-solving. Described in Kirkus Reviews as a "cross between Nancy Drew and Adrian Monk," she is joined by three older brothers—one a computer genius—and a sidekick ferret.

Karbo wrote three books in the series: Minerva Clark Gets a Clue (2005), which involves identity development and identity theft; Minerva Clark Goes To The Dogs (2006), in which she helps a classmate locate a rare red diamond stolen from her ring; and Minerva Clark Gives Up The Ghost (2007), in which she looks for the missing ghost of a haunted grocery store victimized by arson.

== Non-fiction works ==
Like her novels, Karbo's non-fiction works draw on personal experience and phases of life. The New York Times called her first, Generation Ex: Tales From The Second Wives Club (2001), a "smart and ruefully funny examination of divorced life" peppered with solid statistics, anecdotes and hard-earned insight. Publishers Weekly wrote that "Karbo makes ample use of her narrative instinct and canny eye for human foibles," evoking scenes between ex-spouses that achieve "an unerring blend of screwball comedy, tragic drama, feel-good fantasy and stalker flicks." Her The Stuff of Life: A Daughter’s Memoir (2008) was a departure, detailing Karbo's experience caring for her stoic, out-of-state father in his final year, while juggling work, her blended-family responsibilities, and conflicting emotions regarding caregiving, uncommunicative doctors, decline and loss. Reviews described the memoir—a New York Times Notable Book, People Magazine Critic’s Choice, and Oregon Book Award winner—as unembellished, wrenchingly sad and remarkably funny.

Karbo's other, earlier non-fiction work includes Big Girl in the Middle (1997), co-written with volleyball star and model Gabrielle Reece, and essay contributions to anthologies such as The Bitch in the House (2003) and The Best American Sports Writing 1996, among others.

=== "Kick Ass Women" series ===
In her "Kick Ass Women" series, Karbo developed what reviews collectively describe as a new form of biography mixing life story, philosophical treatise, self-help guide and autobiography. Intended as neither scholarly nor comprehensive, the series explores iconic women in short, researched volumes written in a humorous, conversational and occasionally rueful tone. Karbo sought life-lessons from her subjects—in her words, early "self-branders" committed to successfully cultivating singular, unconventional, often eccentric personalities, paths and beliefs despite the heavy gender constraints of their eras.

The first book, How to Hepburn (2007), chronicles key points and anecdotes in Katharine Hepburn's life and career, alongside analysis, diverse lists of her habits, pastimes, rule-breaking and opinions (e.g., "A Primer on How to Be a Class Act"), and a quiz scoring a reader's capacity to be a "Hepburnian Stoic." Karbo attracted more notice for The Gospel According to Coco Chanel (2009), which the Los Angeles Times described as a chatty, fun and insightful look at Chanel's self-invention, relationship to work, money, love and glamour, and impact on women’s fashion and modern life.

In How Georgia Became O’Keeffe (2011), Karbo organized chapters around themes ("Defy," "Adopt") derived from different parts of the artist's life, work and complex relationship with photographer Alfred Stieglitz; Publishers Weekly wrote, "this intimate, quirky, and sassy essay makes its iconic subject into an accessible, relevant figure with whom readers, particularly women, can identify." Julia Child Rules (2013) parses aspects of Child’s personality and early struggles, finding lessons in her work ethic, passion and "immutable aptitude for being herself ... with self-assuredness and joy."

=== Later non-fiction works ===
Following her "Kick Ass Women" series, Karbo came out with the bestselling In Praise of Difficult Women (2018), which Los Angeles Review of Books described as a creative mash-up of biographical essay, self-help book and feminist polemic, "snatching a weaponized word out of the trigger-happy hands of the patriarchy." Its twenty-nine profiles feature women who have resisted convention, oppression and other expectations in favor of self-determination, each one defined by a trait that labeled them "difficult" (e.g., ambitious, brainy, unrestrained, competitive). Many are icons that Karbo mustered after losing her mother; they include well-known (Amelia Earhart, Frida Kahlo, Jane Goodall) as well as underappreciated and unconventional choices, such as writer and war correspondent Martha Gellhorn, comedian Margaret Cho, author Vita Sackville-West, and Hollywood choreographer and writer Kay Thompson.

Karbo's Yeah, No. Not Happening (2020) shares with its predecessor a focus on the exhausting demands of American womanhood, weaving her own story of on-and-off-again dieting and struggles with anxiety into a feminist empowerment guide that advocates self-care and the embrace of imperfection, while railing against "the great female self-improvement bamboozlement."

== Personal life and career ==
Karbo was born in Detroit, Michigan, but grew up in Whittier, California. Her mother was a homemaker and her father an industrial designer whose work included the original Lincoln Continental hood ornament and toys for Mattel. Her grandmother, Emilia Karbowski, was an Independent Hollywood couturiere known as "Luna of California," who designed clothes for the wives of movie moguls in the 1950s. Karbo attended University of Southern California (USC), initially studying journalism and physical therapy; during freshman year, she lost her mother, who died at age 47 soon after being diagnosed with a brain tumor. Karbo ultimately earned a degree in English, then turned to graduate film studies—at the time an overwhelmingly male province—after a screenwriting class revealed her flair for comedy. Following graduation, she co-wrote eight screenplays (none produced), while holding down odd jobs as a papergirl, dog groomer and agent's assistant, before she shifted to writing fiction, publishing her first two novels in the early 1990s.

After her second novel's success, Karbo began receiving journalistic work from magazines such as Outside and Women’s Sports and Fitness. She has characterized many of these assignments as "Professional Guinea Pig" stories—terrifying, humiliating or intensive initiations in wreck-diving in Micronesia, handgun training, surf, boxing or professional baseball camps, the art of trapeze, rollercoaster testing, and PADI-certified shark handling. During this time, her daughter, Fiona, was born. She also wrote and contributed to various short films created by Fiona’s father, Kelley Baker.

Karbo moved to Portland in the late 1990s, and over the next decade, completed her third novel and Minerva Clark series while venturing into non-fiction writing and teaching classes and workshops. In 2015, after publishing her "Kick Ass Women" series, Karbo was among the first class of writers in the Amtrak Writing Residency, one of 24 selected to ride its long-distance routes over the following year. In 2019, she and her husband relocated to the south of France.

== Recognition ==
Karbo has won an Oregon Book Award for creative non-fiction (2005) and a General Electric Younger Writer Award (1989), received National Endowment for the Arts and Oregon Literary Arts fellowships in fiction (both 1992), and been selected for an Amtrak Writing Residency in 2015.

== Books ==
=== Non-fiction ===
- Yeah, No. Not Happening (2020)
- In Praise of Difficult Women (2018)
- Julia Child Rules (2013)
- How Georgia Became O’Keeffe (2011)
- The Gospel According to Coco Chanel (2009)
- The Stuff of Life: A Daughter’s Memoir (2008)
- How to Hepburn (2007)
- Generation Ex: Tales From The Second Wives Club (2001)

=== Novels ===
- Motherhood Made a Man Out Of Me (2000)
- The Diamond Lane (1991)
- Trespassers Welcome Here (1990)

=== Children's ===
- Minerva Clark Gets a Clue (2005)
- Minerva Clark Goes To The Dogs (2006)
- Minerva Clark Gives Up The Ghost (2007)
