= Minnie Ward Patterson =

American poet and author

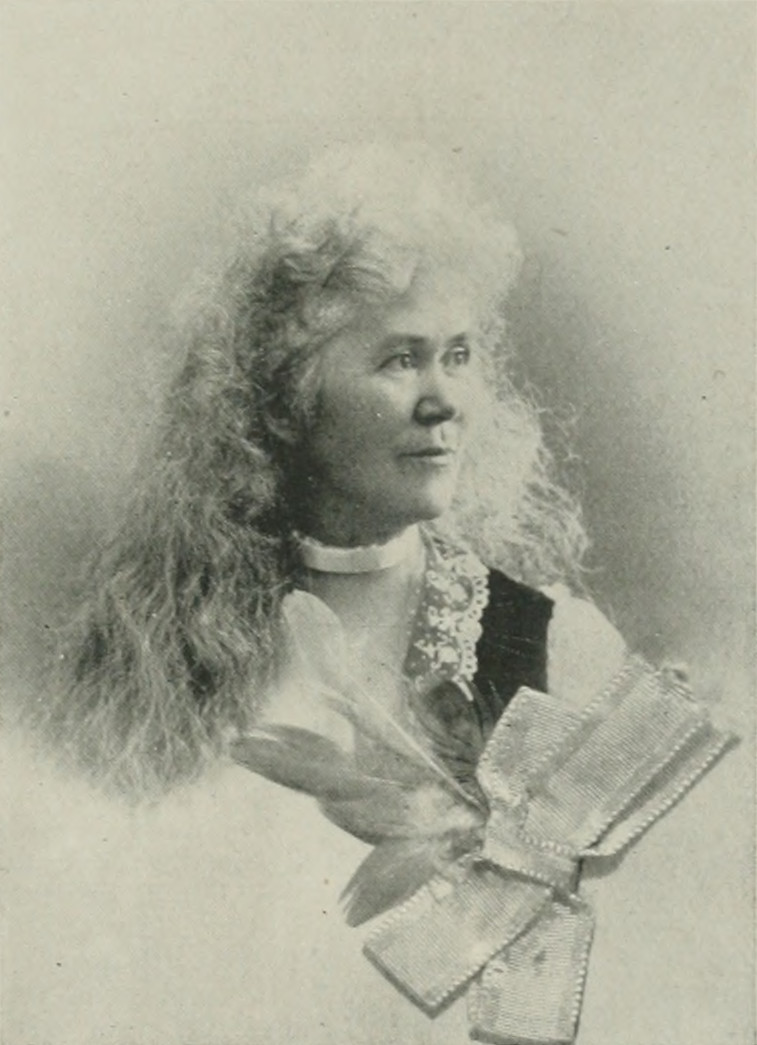
Minnie Ward Patterson, A Woman of the Century (1893)

Minnie Ward Patterson (née Minnie Ward) was a poet and author, born in the city of Niles in Michigan. Her most famous work is Pebbles from Old Pathways.

== Life ==
Minnie Ward was born in about 1844 in Niles, Michigan. Before she reached adulthood, both her parents died, and she was left to the care of strangers. From an early age, she taught music and painting, filling every spare moment with writing. She graduated with honours from Hillsdale College at the age of twenty, and afterwards a degree of A.M.

Soon after leaving school, she opened a studio in Chicago, and was a frequent contributor to the "Sunday Times" usually over the signature of "Zinober Green". While on a sketching tour along the Upper Mississippi, during the summer of 1867, she became the wife of John C. Patterson, a former class-mate in Hillsdale, and a graduate of the law school in Albany, who became a prominent member of the Michigan bar and then was twice elected to the Senate of that State. The couple then resided in Marshall, Michigan. She had some communication with William Cullen Bryant who advised her against making poetry her primary occupation.

== Career ==
Patterson's poems appeared in the Boston Transcript, Youth's Companion, Wide Awake, Peterson's Magazine, the Free Press, Detroit Tribune, Detroit Times, the Journal of Chicago, and various other periodicals.

In 1875 published a book entitled Pebbles from Old Pathways, a 200 page collection of her poetry. Not long after the appearance of that Pebbles she became greatly interested in the Norse languages and literature, and her next work of importance was the translation of three volumes of the Swedish book The Surgeon's Stories, entitled respectively Times of Frederick I, Times of Linnæus, and Times of Alchemy. She also translated many folklore tales from Norwegian, which appeared in various newspapers.

Patterson eventually moved to Colorado Springs, where her son George Leo Patterson was paster of the Congregational Church. When he moved to New York in 1912, she "preached such a forceful sermon that the church unanimously elected her as pastor". In February 1916, it was reported that she had died in a hospital in New York.
