= USS LST-374 =

1943 LST-1-class tank landing ship

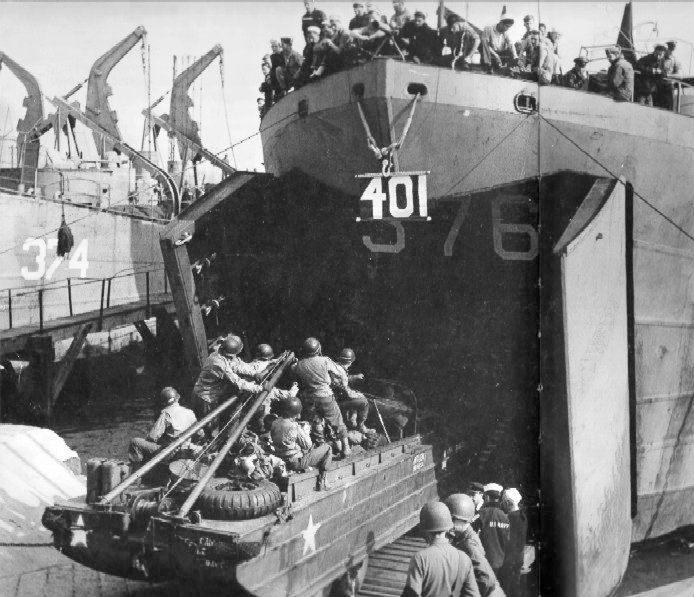
- LST-374, starboard of LST-376, loads a DUKW amphibious truck at an unidentified English port prior to the Invasion of Normandy

History

United States
- Name: USS LST-374
- Builder: Bethlehem Shipbuilding Corporation
- Laid down: 12 November 1942
- Launched: 19 January 1943
- Commissioned: 29 January 1943
- Decommissioned: 29 May 1945
- Stricken: 12 March 1946
- Fate: Sold to merchant service, 14 January 1947, sunk 14 June 1968

General characteristics
- Class & type: LST-1 class tank landing ship
- Displacement: 1,625 long tons (1,651 t) light; 4,080 long tons (4,145 t) full
- Length: 328 ft (100 m)
- Beam: 50 ft (15 m)
- Draft: Unloaded : 2 ft 4 in (0.71 m) bow; 7 ft 6 in (2.29 m) stern; Loaded : 8 ft 2 in (2.49 m) bow; 14 ft 1 in (4.29 m) stern
- Propulsion: 2 × General Motors 12-567 diesel engines, two shafts, twin rudders
- Speed: 12 knots (14 mph; 22 km/h)
- Boats & landing craft carried: Six LCVPs
- Troops: 14 officers, 131 enlisted men
- Complement: 9 officers, 120 enlisted men
- Armament: 2 × twin 40 mm gun mounts (Mark 51 director); 4 × single 40 mm gun mounts; 12 × single 20 mm gun mounts

Service record
- Operations: World War II; Operation Husky; Operation Overlord
- Awards: 2 battle stars

USS LST-374 was one of over 1,000 tank landing ships (LSTs) built for the United States Navy during World War II.

Laid down on 12 November 1942 at Quincy, Massachusetts, by the Bethlehem Steel Company; launched on 19 January 1943; sponsored by Mrs. Victor D. Herbster; and commissioned on 29 January 1943.

== Service history ==
During World War II, LST-374 participated in the Allied invasion of Sicily in July and August 1943 and the invasion of Normandy in June 1944.

Decommissioned 29 May 1945 at Baltimore, Maryland, the ship was redesignated USS Minerva (ARL-47) 29 May 1945. Conversion to a landing craft repair ship commenced on 30 May 1945 at the Maryland Drydock Company of Baltimore; the conversion was subsequently canceled 11 September 1945 and the ship reverted to LST-374. Struck from the Naval Vessel Register 12 March 1946, the tank landing ship was sold to A. G. Schoonmaker for conversion to merchant service 14 January 1947.

LST-374 earned two battle stars for World War II service.

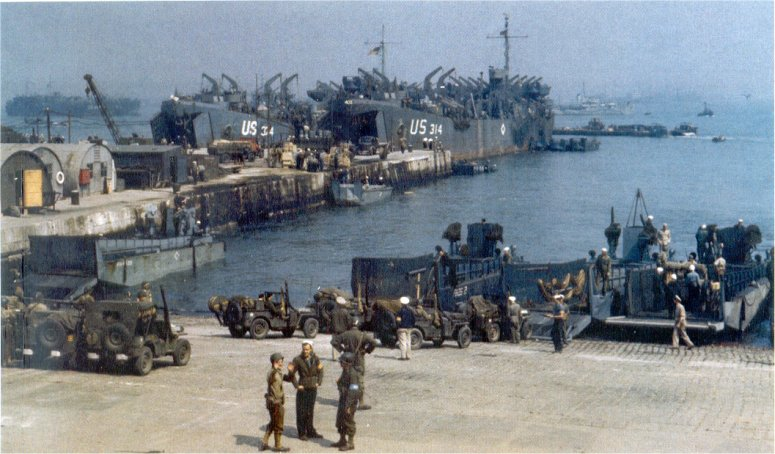
LST-374 and LST-314 loading supplies at an English port in preparation for the Invasion of Normandy, early June 1944.

== See also ==
- List of United States Navy LSTs
