= Korea Broadcasting Art School =

Korean educational institute

- 한국방송예술교육진흥원
- Motto: 대한민국 방송계를 이끌어갈 1%의 리더
- Motto in English: "The 1% of leaders who will lead the broadcasting industry in Korea"
- Established: January 1992; 34 years ago
- President: Park Gwang Seong
- Location: Seodaemun-gu, Seoul, South Korea
- Website: www.kbatv.org

The Korea Broadcasting Art School (Korean: 한국방송예술교육진흥원; Hanja: 韓國放送藝術敎育振興院) is an educational institution in Seoul, South Korea with the credit bank system of the National Institute for Lifelong Education.

The school is located at 197 Sinchon-ro, Seodaemun-gu, Seoul (67-11 Daehyeon-dong), with its own campus and buildings from Hall 1 to Hall 7.

== Departments ==
Korea Broadcasting Art School offers a total of 39 academic programs, organized into 6 departments.

=== Video production department ===
- Video directing major
- Video recording
- Video editing
- YouTube
- Broadcasting writers/Media creation
- Management
- Film Production
- Photography
- Advertising VMD

=== Entertainment department ===
- Voice acting
- Acting arts
- Broadcasting
- Performing arts
- Practical dance
- Model acting arts
- Celebrity

=== Practical music department ===
- Vocal
- K-POP
- Singer-songwriter
- Hip hop
- MIDI arrangement
- Instrumental music

=== Sound production department ===
- Performance Stage
- Broadcasting Video
- Recording and Mixing

=== Visual design department ===
- Video Design (Video CG)
- visual design
- Webtoon/Animation
- 3D content
- illustration
- multimedia design

=== Beauty design department ===
- Makeup & nail art
- Hair design
- Broadcasting makeup
- Beauty Creator

== Facility ==
- Video production lab
- KBAS Creative Studio
- Voice Actor Lab
- Practical Music Lab
- Practical Dance Lab
- Beauty Design Lab
- Model Lab
- Sound Lab
- Art Hall
- Main building

== Notable alumni ==
=== Voice actor major ===
- Jung Hyewon: Class of '01, CJ E&M
- Kim Dodam: Class of '06, KBS
- Kim Min-ah: Class of '06, KBS
- Park Chu-kwang: Class of 2008, KBS
- Jung Yu-jung: Class of 2010, CJ E&M
- Kim Daol: Class of 2010, CJ E&M
- Kim Hyunwook: Class of 2011, Daewon Broadcasting Co.ltd
- Jang Jimin: Class of 2012, KBS
- Oh Gabin: Class of 2013, Daekyo Broadcasting Co.ltd
- Park Jun-won: Class of 2013, Daewon Broadcasting Co.ltd
- Lim Chaebin: Class of 2014, Daewon Broadcasting Co.ltd
- Kim Yoongi: Class of 2016, CJ E&M
- Kim Chae-rim: Class of 2018, CJ E&M
