= Minerva Clark Gets a Clue =

2005 children's novel by Karen Karbo

- Bloomsbury hardback edition
- Author: Karen Karbo
- Language: English
- Genre: Children's literature
- Publisher: Bloomsbury
- Publication date: 2005
- Publication place: USA
- Media type: Print
- Pages: 256 pp
- ISBN: 978-1-58234-677-9
- OCLC: 74495199

Minerva Clark Gets a Clue is the first book in the Minerva Clark series of mystery novels. Minerva Clark Gets a Clue was written by Karen Karbo and was published by Bloomsbury Children's Books in 2005.

== Plot summary ==
Thirteen-year-old Minerva Clark lives in Portland, Oregon and is being raised by her three brothers. She is a typical insecure teenager, but when she is struck by lightning, her personality changes – she becomes outgoing and confident overnight. And when she senses a mystery she cannot resist investigating.

== Sequels ==
The other books in the series are Minerva Clark Goes to the Dogs (2006), and Minerva Clark Gives Up the Ghost (2007).
