= French frigate Minerve (1831) =

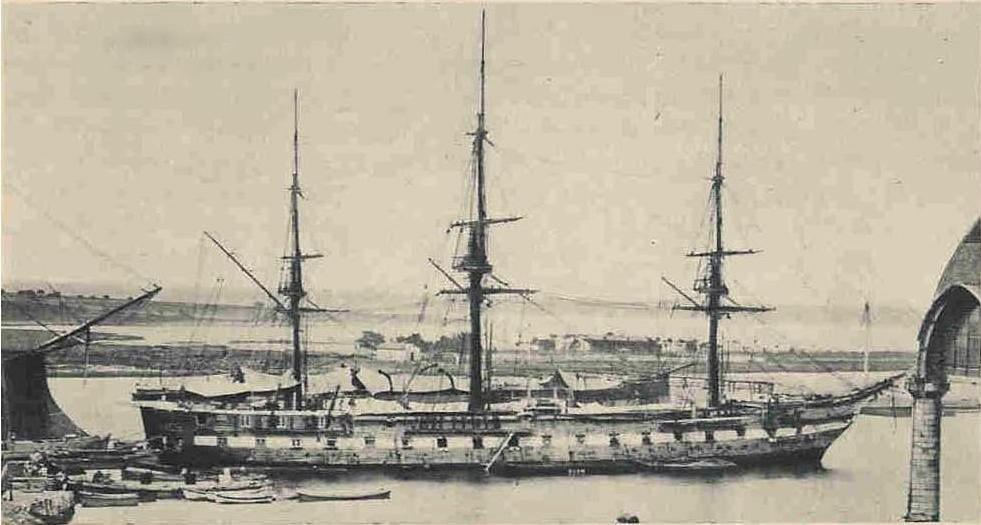
- Minerve in 1865

History

France
- Name: 1831 Minerve; 1830 Glorieux; 1814 Duc de Berry; 1812 Glorieux; 1807 Couronne
- Namesake: Minerva
- Ordered: 21 August 1807
- Builder: Rochefort
- Laid down: 13 January 1812
- Launched: 18 June 1818
- Completed: July 1818 as ship of the line; 16 October 1836 as frigate
- Stricken: 12 December 1853
- Fate: Condemned for demolition 1874

General characteristics
- Class & type: 32-gun frigate
- Displacement: 3,069 tonneaux
- Tons burthen: 1,537 port tonneaux
- Length: 55.87 metres
- Beam: 14.50 metres
- Draught: 6.73 metres (6.41 after rebuild)
- Propulsion: Sails
- Sail plan: Full-rigged ship
- Armament: In 1817: LD: 28 × 36-pounder long guns; UD: 30 × 18-pounder long guns; QD and Fc: 14 × 8-pounder long guns and 10 × 36-pounder carronades; In 1836: LD: 26 × 36-pounder long guns and 2 × 22cm Paixhans guns; QD and Fc: 28 × 36-pounder carronades; As gunnery school: LD: 24 × 30-pounder long guns, 3 × 22cm Paixhans guns; QD and Fc: 17 × 30-pounder carronades, 4 × 16cm howitzers

Minerve was a 74-gun Téméraire-class ship of the line built for the French Navy during the 1810s. Not commissioned until 1818, the ship was razeed during the 1830s and recommissioned as a frigate.

== Description ==
Designed by Jacques-Noël Sané, the Téméraire-class ships had a length of 55.87 metres (183 ft 4 in), a beam of 14.46 metres (47 ft 5 in) and a depth of hold of 7.15 metres (23 ft 5 in). The ships displaced 3,069 tonneaux and had a mean draught of 7.15 metres (23 ft 5 in). They had a tonnage of 1,537 port tonneaux. Their crew numbered 705 officers and ratings during wartime. They were fitted with three masts and ship rigged.

The muzzle-loading, smoothbore armament of the Téméraire class consisted of twenty-eight 36-pounder long guns on the lower gun deck and thirty 18-pounder long guns on the upper gun deck. After about 1807, the armament on the quarterdeck and forecastle varied widely between ships with differing numbers of 8-pounder long guns and 36-pounder carronades. The total number of guns varied between sixteen and twenty-eight. The 36-pounder obusiers formerly mounted on the poop deck (dunette) in older ships were removed as obsolete.

== Construction and career ==
Ordered in 1807, the ship was initially to be named Couronne, but was renamed Glorieux in 1812, and Duc de Berry in 1814 at the Bourbon Restoration. She was laid down on 13 January 1812 at the Arsenal de Rochefort, launched on 18 June 1818, and completed the following month. After the July Revolution in 1830 she became Glorieux again. The next year, she was renamed Minerve. The ship was razeed and converted into a 1st rank, 58-gun frigate from 1833 to October 1834. On 10 October 1844, Minerve ran aground off Rhodes, Greece; she was refloated with the aid of the French Navy brig Alcibiade and six Ottoman Navy vessels.
