= Minerva Goodman =

American physician

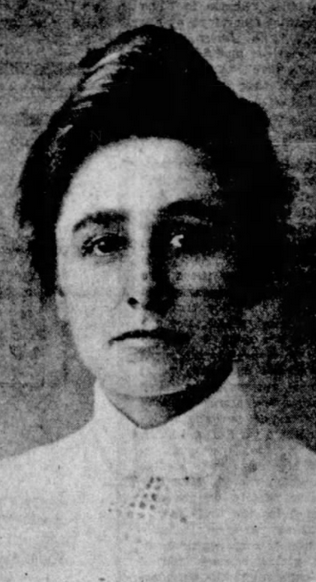
- Minerva Goodman, from a 1909 newspaper
- Born: January 2, 1876; Olmsted County, Minnesota, U.S.
- Died: July 1, 1967 (age 91); Stockton, California, U.S.
- Education: College of the Pacific
- Occupations: Physician, suffragist, clubwoman

Minerva Goodman (January 2, 1876 – July 1, 1967) was an American physician, suffragist, and clubwoman, based in Stockton, California.

== Early life and education ==
Goodman was born in Orion Township, Olmsted County, Minnesota, the daughter of Harvey Adelbert Goodman and Jane Ayer Robinson Goodman. She earned her medical degree at the University of Minnesota in 1902.

== Career ==
Goodman was a physician in Stockton, California from 1904 until 1962. As city health officer, she organized "better baby contests" and instituted mask mandates during the 1918 flu pandemic. She was also the school medical inspector and secretary of the local American Red Cross chapter. She spoke to community groups on a wide range of public health matters, including meat inspection and safety in childbirth. She helped to create Stockton's sanatorium for tuberculosis patients. "Dr. Goodman is not a woman of beautiful theories and cobwebbed plans, but of practical ideas cast in the mould of common sense," explained a 1909 newspaper profile.

From 1924 to 1962, Goodman was the physician for women students at the College of the Pacific. She was president of the Stockton Political Equality Club. She supported the work of the Wage Earners' Equal Suffrage League of San Francisco, and the Political Equality League of Los Angeles. After the vote was won, she was active in the local League of Women Voters.

Beyond her medicine and suffrage activities, Stockton was president of Stockton's Business and Professional Women's Club, and president of the San Jose chapter of the American Association of University Women (AAUW). She hiked with the Sierra Club, and was a leader of the Stockton Camp Fire Girls. She traveled in Europe during the summer of 1927, and wrote travel descriptions for the Stockton newspaper. She served on the board of directors of Goodwill Industries of Stockton in the late 1930s. In 1954, she attended a Stockton city council meeting to protest a change in policy pertaining to sidewalk repairs.

== Personal life ==
Goodman adopted and raised a daughter, Elizabeth, who was born in 1915. Goodman died in 1967, at the age of 91. There is a collection of her papers, mostly concerning her suffrage work, in the collection of the University of the Pacific.
