= Minerva (1813 Aberdeen ship) =

History

United Kingdom
- Name: Minerva
- Namesake: Minerva
- Builder: Alexander Hall, Aberdeen
- Launched: 1813
- Fate: Wrecked 13 May 1820
- Notes: The database of Aberdeen Built Ships conflates this Minerva with Minerva

General characteristics
- Tons burthen: 202, or 213 by calc. (bm)
- Length: 86 ft 2 in (26.3 m)
- Beam: 1812:24 ft 4 in (7.4 m)
- Armament: 6 × 12-pounder carronades

Minerva was launched in 1813 at Aberdeen. She traded across the Atlantic until she was wrecked in the St Lawrence on 13 May 1820.

== Career ==
Minerva first appeared in Lloyd's Register (LR), in 1813.

Year	Master	Owner	Trade	Source & notes
1813	T.Lyall	Saunders	London	LR
1814	T.Lyall; McIntosh	Sanders	London–Malta; London–St Vincent	LR
1816	T.Lyall	Sannders	London; London–St Thomas	LR
1818	T.Lyall; Stratham	Saunders	London-St Thomas; London–Demerara	LR
1819	Strachan; Morgan	R.Gibbon	London–Demerara; London–Quebec	LR
1820	Morgan	Thompson	London–Quebec	LR

On 4 March 1818 a gale on the coast of England drove a number of vessels on shore. Minerva, Strachan, master, was driven on shore back of the West Pier Head at Ramsgate. She was on her way from London to Demerara. She was gotten off and taken into port on 8 March. On 28 April she sailed from Ramsgate for Demerara

== Fate ==
On 14 May 1820, Captain Morgan, of the brig Minerva, from Liverpool, arrived at Quebec City with her crew in her boats. She had struck some rocks the evening before in the Saint Lawrence River at the head of the Traverse, about 18 nautical miles (33 km) south of the port, when she had let go her anchors. Captain Morgan, the pilot and the crew took to her boats and headed for the shore. They watched her fill with water and sink at about 11pm.
