= USS Minerva =

USS Minerva may refer to the following ships of the United States Navy:

- USS Sandusky (1865), a steam gunboat accepted in 1866 but never commissioned, renamed Minerva 15 June 1869 and renamed Sandusky again 10 August 1869, and sold in 1873
- USS Minerva (SP-425), a patrol boat in commission from 1917 to 1919
- USS LST-374, a tank landing ship tank commissioned in 1943, decommissioned for conversion into the landing craft repair ship USS Minerva (ARL‑47) in 1945 but never converted, and sold in 1947
