= Minerva (1812 ship) =

Merchant ship (1812–1833)

History

United Kingdom
- Name: Minerva
- Namesake: Minerva
- Builder: Robert Gibbon & Sons, Aberdeen
- Launched: October 1812,
- Fate: Last listed 1833
- Notes: The Aberdeen Built Ships database conflates this Minerva with Minerva

General characteristics
- Tons burthen: 220, or 25417/94, or 255 by calc., or 258, or 259 (bm)
- Length: 86 ft 7 in (26.4 m)
- Beam: 26 ft 0 in (7.9 m)
- Armament: 6 × 12-pounder carronades

Minerva was launched in 1812 at Aberdeen. Her early career is obscure. In 1823 she visited New South Wales and was condemned at Valparaiso in 1823 on her way home. She was repaired and from about 1827 she sailed to India under a license from the British East India Company. She transferred her registry to Calcutta prior to 1829, but continued to be listed in the British registries until 1833.

== Career ==
Minerva first appeared in the Register of Shipping (RS), in 1813.

Year	Master	Owner	Trade	Source & notes
1813	Sharp	R.Gibbons	London transport	RS
1816	Sharp	R.Gibbons	London transport	RS

Minerva, Sharp, master, first appeared in Lloyd's List's ship arrival and departure (SAD) data having arrived from Jamaica on 9 July 1813 at Gravesend. She was laid up at Miramichi to overwinter between 1815 and 1816. She arrived at Chester from Miramichi in July 1816.

Year	Master	Owner	Trade	Source & notes
1818	C.Sharp	R.Gibbon	London–Halifax	LR
1820	C.Sharp	R.Gibbon	Cork	LR
1822	C.Sharp; J. Bell	R.Gibbon	Cork; Lieth–New South Wales	LR

Minerva, Charles Sharp, master, was advertised in October 1821 as sailing for Van Diemen's Land and New South Wales on 20 November from Leith. The advertisement stated that she was classified as "A–1", and of "400 tons burthen".

Minerva appeared in the Register of Shipping (RS) in 1822 with Bell, master, W. Gibbon, owner, and trade London–Leith, changing to Leith–to New South Wales. In 1823 it showed Minerva with Bell, master, W.Gibbon, owner, and trade Leith–to New South Wales. Minerva first appeared in Lloyd's Register (LR) in 1823 with J.Bell, master, R.Gibbons, owner, and trade Liverpool–New South Wales.

Then on 11 November 1823 Lloyd's List passed on a report that Minerva, Bell, master, on her way from New South Wales, had put into Valparaiso in distress and had been condemned there.

Minerva, however, was repaired and returned to service.

Year	Master	Owner	Trade	Source & notes
1824	Bell	Leith–New South Wales	W.Gibbon	RS
1827	Bell; Norris	W.Gibbon; Montgomery	London–New South Wales	RS; repairs 1821
1828	J.Norris	Montgomery	London–Bengal	LR; small repairs 1827
1833	J.Norris	Montgomery	London–Bengal	LR; small repairs 1827

On 27 March 1827 Minerva, Norris, master sailed for Bengal. The last mention of Minerva, Norris, master, in newspaper mentions of ship arrival and departure data was that she had departed from Rangoon on 24 November 1828.

== Fate ==
Her owners transferred Minerva's registry to Calcutta. She appeared in the East India Registry and Directory for 1829. It showed Minerva, J.Norris, master, of 254 tons (bm), built in Scotland, with Montgomery and Company, owners.
