= Minerva (Internet celebrity) =

Korean online writer

Minerva (Korean: 미네르바) is the Internet username of a "netizen" who wrote about the Korean economy and the economic policies of the Korean government. Minerva's writing evoked the ire of the Korean government, when an entry precipitated a run on the South Korean won. Prosecutors arrested a man they claim to be Minerva, Park Dae-sung, and charged him with the crime of electronically spreading false rumors that damage the public good. The true identity of Minerva, however, remains to be established. The arrest has also drawn international scrutiny. Minerva posted articles in Daum Agora, one of the largest Internet debate bulletin boards in South Korea, from March 2008 to January 2009.

Minerva has successfully predicted major events in the Korean economy and was quick to provide solutions for both the government and households. Despite his warnings, the Korean government's economic policies remained controversial, with Minerva becoming one of the most influential critics of the government's policies. It was under this background that Minerva became known as "the Internet Economic President." Among the famous predictions Minerva has made were: the collapse of Lehman Brothers and its potential consequences, and the sharp decline of South Korean currency value against the U.S. dollar at specified time points.

== Famous postings ==
=== Objection against KDB's takeover of Lehman Brothers Holdings ===
Minerva expressed concerns over the planned takeover of Lehman Brothers Holdings, Inc. by the Korean Development Bank (KDB). This was well before the financial instability of the US investment bank was known to the public.

== Arrest of Minerva ==
On January 7, 2009, prosecutors arrested a suspect believed to be Minerva for "spreading false rumors on the Internet". The prosecutors announced the anonymous blogger economist was a 30-year-old unemployed man.

An article was posted by Minerva on December 29, 2008, in the economy section of Daum Agora bulletin boards. The article claimed that the Korean government issued an urgent directive to major financial companies and explicitly mentioned a ban on purchase of U.S. dollars. The Korean Ministry of Strategy and Finance quickly made a statement denying any such move from the government. The Agora post was initially screened from viewing by Daum and was later removed by the author. Minerva responded with an apology for the article.

It was that article that prosecutors are said to be motivated to arrest Minerva. They have regarded it as a false rumor.

Original text is:

2008년 12월 29일 오후 2시 30분 이후 주요 7대 금융 기관및 수출.입
관련 주요 기업에게 달러 매수를 금지할 것을 긴급 공문 전송.
- 정부 긴급 업무 명령 1호-
중요 세부 사항은 각 회사별 자금 관리 운용팀에 문의 바람. 세부적인 스
팩은 법적 문제상 공개적으로 말할수 없음.
단 한시적인 기간 내의 정부 업무 명령인 것으로 제한 한다.

— 미네르바 글모음 제4권, 10. 대정부 긴급 공문 발송 - 1보 (2008-12-29) (Note: Minerva usually writes articles untidily.)

Translation of the text is:

2008 Dec 29, after 2:30 PM, sending an urgent official note to the 7 main financial agencies and export-import corporations not to buy dollars- the Government Urgent Business Direction No.1 -Important details can be inquired to finance management team of the corporation. Details cannot be told owing to legal problem. But this order is limited within a fixed period.

— Minerva Writings Collection Vol.4 Art.10., Sending an urgent official note to the government – First report (2008-12-29) (Note: A Korean prefix '대-' means 'big', 'great' or 'to (something/someone)'. So the article name can be interpreted as "Great government sending an urgent official note - First report". The original article was also vague to Korean readers.)

== Acquittal and government appeal ==
On April 20, 2009 Park Dae-sung was acquitted and released from jail. The reasoning of the court was that if any of the statements he made were false, he did not know they were false.

However, South Korean law allows the prosecution to appeal the acquittal, and they are doing so. The appeal is expected to be ruled upon in the winter of 2009–10.

== Controversy ==
=== Arrest and freedom of expression ===
There are many doubts and criticisms surrounding the arrest. For example, the law (Electronic Communication Fundamental Law, Korean: 전기통신기본법; Hanja: 電氣通信基本法) Minerva is known to have violated is possibly unconstitutional.

A person spreading a false rumor maliciously intending to damage the public interest by using an electronic machine can be sentenced to imprisonment for under five years or given a fine of under 50,000,000 won

— Electronic Communication Fundamental Law Article 47 Clause 1, Republic of Korea

Minbyun, Korean Lawyers for a Democratic Society (Korean: 민주사회를위한변호사모임) argued that though it is about the criminal penalty, the clause is vague, which is against the Law of Clearance, meaning that the law about crime must be clearly declared for people to understand it, derived from Nulla poena sine lege, thus this clause is probably unconstitutional. And Korea University Lawschool Professor Park Kyung-Sin said "The most effective way to oppose rumors, which seem false, is not punishment to the speaker, but ensurance of the freedom of expression."

Many people doubt whether the writings of Minerva are obviously false. There is evidence indicating that the government did control the exchange rate.

Lee Seok-Hyeon, a congressman of Democratic Party, argued that the government actually did request banks to restrain from buying dollars. According to him, the Ministry of Strategy and Finance called staff members of the seven main banks into a meeting at the Korea Federation of Banks in Myeong-dong on December 26, 2008. In the meeting, the authority asked them for self-restraint in purchasing dollars. Lee Seok-Hyeon said he heard this directly from a man who was at the meeting.

Foreign bloggers writing about Korea have cast doubt about the government's handling of the opinionated blogger. Some express concerns that this would mean demise of freedom of speech in Korea.

=== Maeil Business Newspaper's Minerva ===
On November 11, 2008, Maeil Business Newspaper quoted a government intelligence source on the identity of Minerva. The intelligence representative has been quoted as saying that "the government needed to provide Minerva with correct information and statistics" as the reason for looking up his identity. The source said Minerva is an individual in early 50s who has worked overseas in the stock market business. Minerva subsequently announced that he will no longer post anything on the economy saying that "the country ordered silence".

=== readme's Minerva ===
There has been a Daum Agora poster claiming to be a distant acquaintance of Minerva's. The reference "Minerva K" comes from his posting, where "K" is an alphabetical equivalent of a binary ASCII code Minerva has left in one of his postings. Readme's posting made a wave when he asserted that Minerva is a well-known and influential figure in the South Korean financial circles.

=== Shin DongA's Minerva K ===
Shin DongA (Korean: 신동아), a current event magazine of the DongA Ilbo newspaper published two articles from the purported Minerva. In the first article Minerva summarized his previous postings in Daum Agora. In the second article, following the arrest of Park, he claims "Minerva" is in fact a small group of people in the financial business who are concerned with the nation's economy. Shin DongA's Minerva claimed that Park has been unknown to his group and discredited Park, saying that he revealed serious lack of basic knowledge.

Although the reference to "K" gets reiterated in Shin DongA's articles, readme retorted their version Minerva is a pure fiction. Park, the arrestee, stated he never wrote for Shin DongA. The prosecutors, however, announced that they have no plan to investigate Shin DongA's "Minerva K".

On February 17, 2009, the DongA Ilbo published an apology saying that their Minerva K was not the famous Daum Agora writer and the details are still under investigation.

=== Park Dae-sung ===
All postings by Minerva come from two IP addresses and a single log-on ID. The prosecutors say they can single out only one person that matches this criterion. Shortly after the arrest, the prosecutors let Park write a short essay on this year's economic perspective. He produced a one-page report which the prosecutors found professionally written. Others pointed out a number of faults in basic knowledge and lack of style. Particularly erroneous was his observation on the growth rate of the Chinese economy, which he expected to become negative in 2009.

The prosecutors also tested Park's knowledge by asking a handful of financial jargons he has used in his postings: 1) Tobin's q, 2) BDI and freight rates, 3) the LTCM crisis in 1998, 4) spread, 5) offshore NDF market, and 6) trickle down. According to the prosecutors, he did not remember Tobin's q but answered to most of questions. He was able to provide lengthy answers to questions 2 and 3.

In February 2009, South Korea's TV broadcaster SBS (Seoul Broadcasting System) has aired an investigative special on Minerva. They gave Park a written test similar to the prosecutors'. The questions were: 1) dynamic hedging, 2) yen carry trade and cross trade, 3) BDI and freight rates, 4) spread (between onshore and) offshore NDF markets, 5) 01001011, a binary code he left in a posting on his identity in November 2008. Park only answered to questions 3) and 4) in an unsatisfactory way, according to a commentator Damdamdangdang (Korean: 담담당당) in Daum Agora. In the show, SBS concluded nonetheless that Park is the true Minerva.

== Chronology of events ==
- 2008-3: Minerva, starts to post in Economics discussions bulletin in Daum's "Agora"
- 2008-7-14: Minerva, "Households should better prepare for commodity price rises" predicts the heavy impact on Korean households of USA's sub-prime Mortgage Crisis.
- 2008-8-25: Minerva, "Korean Development Bank has to consider toxic assets that amounts to 50billion KRW" objects to the acquisition of Lehman Brothers by Korean Development Bank. (Lehman shares tumbled over 90% on September 15, 2008)
- 2008-8-29: Minerva, predicts rise of KRW against USD to 1125 in mid September, 1180~1200 in end of September.
- 2008-9-18: Minerva, "short cover securities, because KOSPI will fall to 1210~1235". (KOSPI was at that time 1392)
- 2008-10-6: Minerva, predicts that KRW may surge to 1400 without Korea-US currency swap (KRW went over 1400 against USD in the end of October)
- 2008-11-3: Minister of Justice, mentioned possible investigation of "Minerva"
- 2008-11-11: Press report "Minerva is supposed to be a man in early 50s with experience with securities company, having lived and worked overseas," quoting an intelligence agency.
- 2008-11-13: Minerva, announces s/he will stop posting.
- 2008-11-16: The Union of Citizens for a Democratic Press, award Minerva a Prize
- 2008-11-17: KBS, Current Affairs 360, broadcast a programme, 'Why, Minerva is a phenomenon?'
- 2008-11-18: Professor Kim, Tae Dong, makes an apology regarding the interview with Sisa360 (Korean: 시사360, a TV program about current affairs), saying that the interview with himself was distorted by the producer.
- 2008-12: Shin DongA, a magazine affiliated with DongA Ilbo, published "Minerva"'s contribution arguing that it contacted him secretly. Park Dae-sung denied he has ever contacted Sin DongA
- 2008-12-24: A staff of Ministry of Strategy and Finance admitted to reporters that he asked for "support" of major importers, exporter, state owned enterprises, and financial institutions.
- 2008-12-29: Minerva posted on the government intervention, hinting that households, small and medium enterprises, should utilize this opportunity to profit from changing foreign exchange rates.
- 2009-1-5: Minerva's last posting, "We should rely on hope"
- 2009-1-7: Minerva arrested by the Prosecutors
- 2009-1-8: Ministry of Strategy and Finance denies intervening in the criminal prosecution of "Minerva" in a press release
- 2009-1-8: Prosecutors indict "Minerva" .
- 2009-4-20: Park Dae-sung was acquitted and released from jail

== See also ==
- Constitution of the Republic of Korea
