= HMS Minerve =

Three ships of the Royal Navy have borne the name HMS Minerve, a French form of Minerva, a goddess in Roman mythology:

- HMS Minerve was a 38-gun fifth rate captured from the French in 1795. She was recaptured by them in 1803 and renamed Canonniere, but was recaptured by the British in 1810 and renamed HMS Confiance. She was on the navy lists until 1814.
- HMS Minerve (1803) was a prison hulk, formerly a French sloop. She was captured in 1803 and broken up in 1811.
- Minerve was a Minerve-class submarine of the French Navy seized by the British in 1940. She was operated by Free French crew until being wrecked in 1945.
