= Athena (given name) =

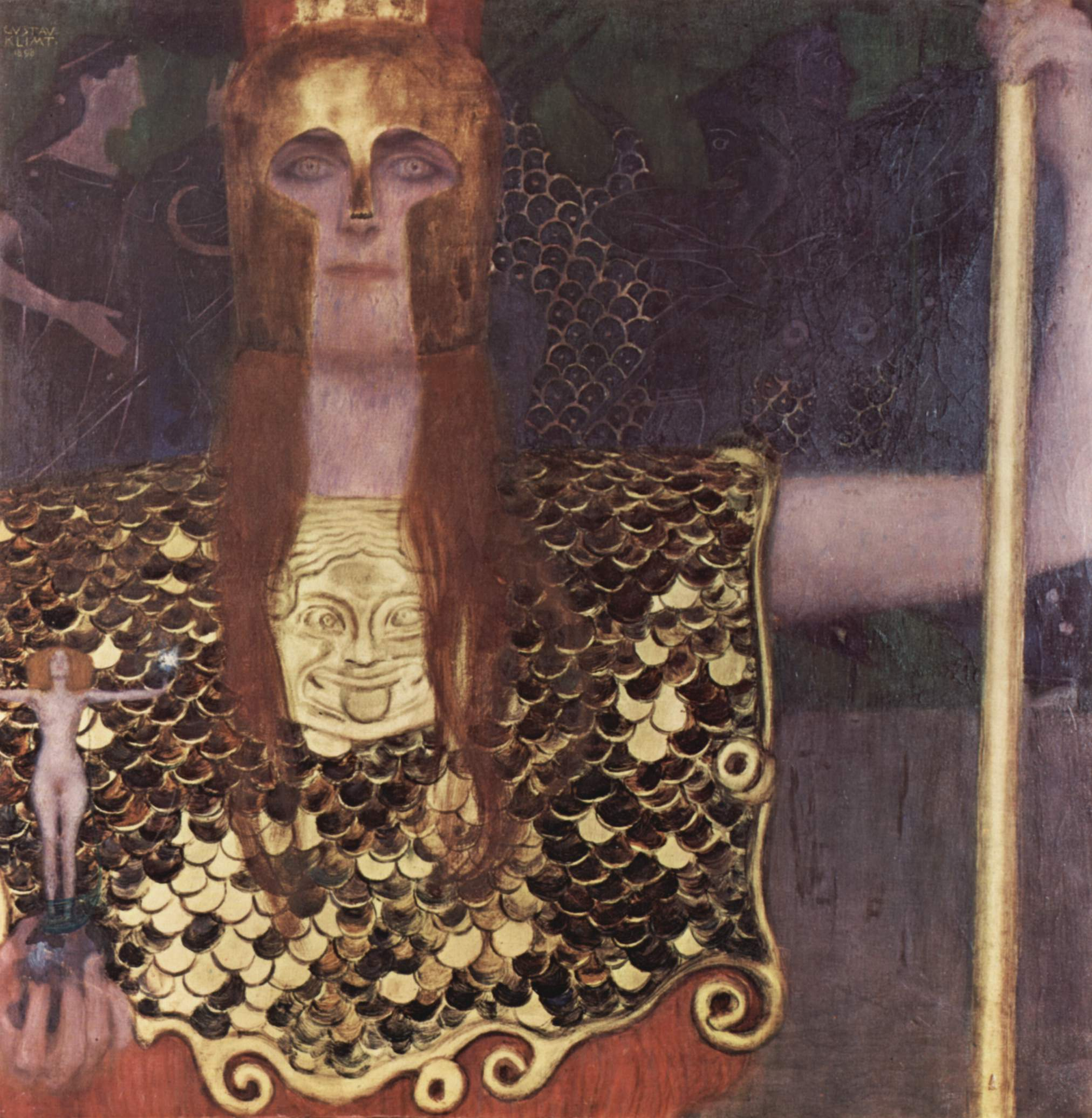
- Pallas Athena by Gustav Klimt.
- Gender: Feminine

Origin
- Origin: Greek

Other names
- Related names: Afina (Russian), (Ukrainian), Athéna (French), Aþena Icelandic, Athenais, Athénaïs (French), Athene, Athina (Modern Greek)

Athena is a feminine given name of Greek origin, often used in reference to the Greco-Roman goddess Athena, the goddess of wisdom, strategic warfare, and handicraft.

== Usage ==
Athena was among the top 10 names for newborn girls in the Philippines in 2022. It has been among the top 1,000 names for girls in the United States since the mid-1950s and was the 76th most popular name for newborn American girls in 2023. It has been one of the 500 most popular names for girls in England and Wales since 2012 and was the 104th most popular name for newborn British girls in 2023. It has also been well-used in recent years in Canada, France, Iceland, Italy, and New Zealand. The popularity of mythological names also increased in use for babies born during the COVID-19 pandemic.

People with this given name include:

== People ==
Stagenamed "Athena"

- Athena the Gladiator, stagename of Karenjeet Kaur Bains
- Athena Andreadis, aka Athena, an Anglo-Greek musician
- Athena Tibi, aka Athena, a Filipino singer & actress based in Japan
- Athena (wrestler), ring name of U.S. pro-wrestler Adrienne (Reese) Palmer

Given named "Athena"

- Athena Aktipis, U.S. psychologist
- Athena Andreadis, an Anglo-Greek musician
- Athena Cage (born 1970), U.S. singer
- Athena Chu (born 1971), Hongkong actress
- Athena Coustenis (born 1961), French astrophysicist
- Athena Farrokhzad (born 1983), Iranian Swedish poet-playwright
- Athena Finger, heir to cartoonist Bill Finger, co-creator of Batman
- Athena Marguerite Françoise Marie Glücksburg, Princess Athena of Denmark (born 2012)
- Athena Imperial (born 1987), Filipina journalist
- Athena Karkanis (born 1981), Canadian actress
- Athena King, former journalist for the Naked News
- Athena Kugblenu, British stand-up comedian and writer
- Athena LaTocha, Lakota Amerindian artist
- Athena Lee (markswoman), Philippine-American competition shooter
- Athena Lee (born 1964), U.S. musician
- Athéna Locatelli (born 1991), French ice hockey player
- Athena Loizides (born 1965), Greek Cypriot TV personality
- Athena Lundberg (born 1986), PMOM January 2006
- Athena McNinch (born 1997), Guamanian-Taiwanese pageant queen
- Athena Manoukian (born 1994), Greek-Armenian singer
- Athena Michailidou (1918–2001), Greek actress
- Athena Papas, U.S. dental scholar
- Athena Reich, Canadian-American actress
- Athena Salman, U.S. politician
- Athena Sefat, U.S. physicist
- Athena Starwoman (1945–2004), Australian psychic
- Athena Strand (2015–2022), American murder victim
- Athena Tacha (born 1936), Greek artist
- Athena Tibi (born 1988), Filipina singer and actress based in Japan
- Athena Xenidou, Cypriot writer-director
- Athena Lee Yen (born 1981), Taiwanese actress
- Athena Yang (born 2007), Korean-Swedish kpop idol and member of kpop girl group Fifty Fifty (group)

== Mythological ==
- Athena (Greek: Ἀθηνᾶ), Greco-Roman goddess
  - Minerva, Roman equivalent, sometimes called Athena
  - Pallas Athena, aspect
  - Athena Alea, Greek aspect
  - Athena Areia, Greek aspect
  - Athena Alkidemos, Greek aspect

== Fictional characters ==
- Athena, a mascot for the 2004 Summer Olympics, one of the trio of Athena, Phevos and Proteas
- Athena (DC Comics), a DC Comics character and member of the Olympian Gods
- Athena (Marvel Comics), a Marvel Comics character and member of the Olympian Gods
- Thena, another Marvel Comics character who has gone by the name Athena, a member of the Eternals
- Athena, an Image Comics character, Lily Nalin, and member of Bloodstrike
- Athena, an owl character from the Rainbow Butterfly Unicorn Kitty TV series
- Athena (The Little Mermaid), Princess Ariel's mother in the Disney franchise
- Athena, a Marvel UK character and member of the Warheads
- Princess Athena, main character of the 1986 SNK video game Athena
- Athena Asamiya, a character in the video game Psycho Soldier and The King of Fighters series, described as a descendant of Princess Athena of the 1986 video game Athena
- Athena, the first opponent of Godou Kusanagi in the manga/anime Campione!
- "Athena", a codename for character Dana Mercer, a sister of protagonist of [PROTOTYPE]
- Athena (Stargate), a Goa'uld in the TV series Stargate SG-1
- Athena the Gladiator, an important character from the Borderlands video game series
- Lieutenant Athena, a bridge officer in the 1978–79 television series Battlestar Galactica
  - Number Eight (Battlestar Galactica), a Humanoid Cylon, with multiple copies, in the 2004 reboot of Battlestar Galactica, one of whom is Sharon "Athena" Agathon.
- Athena, an important character in the Sony PlayStation 2 game God of War
- Athena Cykes, a defense attorney from the Ace Attorney franchise
- Athena Glory, a character from the animanga Aria
- Athena Grant, LAPD sergeant on the TV series 9-1-1
- Athena Morrow, a character on the TV series Hvmans
- Athena Tennousu, a character in the manga/anime Hayate the Combat Butler and the eponymous protagonist's first true love
- Athena, a sentient artificial intelligence and a legal person in Sunstorm science fiction novel co-written by British writers Arthur C. Clarke and Stephen Baxter

== See also ==
- Athena (disambiguation)
