= Athens (disambiguation) =

Athens is the capital of Greece.

Athens may also refer to:

== Relating to Athens, Greece ==
- Classical Athens, the city in Classical Antiquity
  - Athenian democracy
  - First Athenian League
  - Second Athenian League
- Duchy of Athens (1205–1458), Crusader State centered around the city
- Municipality of Athens
- Athens A and Athens B, parliamentary constituencies
- Athens Prefecture (1987–2010)
- Central Athens (regional unit) (created 2011)
- Athens Exchange, the stock exchange
- Athens University of Economics and Business
- National and Kapodistrian University of Athens, or simply the University of Athens

== Places ==
=== Canada ===
- Athens, Ontario

=== Greece ===
- Athenae Diades, a town of ancient Euboea
- Athenae (Boeotia), a town of ancient Boeotia

=== Turkey ===
- Athenae (Pontus), a city of ancient Pontus

=== United States ===
- Athens, Alabama
- Athens, Arkansas
- Athens, California
- Athens, Georgia, sixth-largest city in Georgia
- Athens, Illinois
- Athens, Indiana
- Athens, Kentucky
- Athens, Louisiana
- Athens, Maine
- Athens, Michigan
- Athens, Mississippi
- Athens, Missouri
- Athens, Nevada
- Athens, New York
- Athens (village), New York
- Athens, Ohio
- Athens County, Ohio
- Athens, Pennsylvania, a borough
- Athens, Tennessee
- Athens, Texas
- Athens, Vermont
- Athens, West Virginia
- Athens, Wisconsin

=== Elsewhere ===
- Pontic Athens, a city on the Black Sea mentioned in the 2nd century

== Other uses ==
- Athens (typeface)
- ATHENS Programme, an exchange network of European higher education institutions
- Athenas, Argentine Catholic music singer
- Lonnie Athens (fl. from 1992), American criminologist
- OpenAthens, an access and identity management service, previously known as Athens

== See also ==
- Athen (disambiguation)
- Atena (disambiguation)
- Atina (disambiguation)
- Athena (disambiguation)
- Athene (disambiguation)
- Altena (disambiguation)
- Athens Township (disambiguation)
- Athina (disambiguation)
- Afini
- ʻAtenisi Institute ('Athens Institute), in Tonga
- Athens Drive High School, in North Carolina, U.S.
