= Athena (disambiguation) =

In Greek mythology, Athena (Ancient Greek: Αθηνά) is a goddess of wisdom, strategic-war and weaving.

Athena may also refer to:

- Athena (given name), for people and fictional characters

== Places ==
- Athena, Oregon, United States
- Athena (Olympic Mountains), a summit in Olympic National Park, United States
- Leicester Athena, venue and landmark in the English Midlands

== Companies ==
- Athena (game developer), Japan
- Athena Computer & Electronic Systems, a defunct American laptop pioneer
- Athena Eizou, a Japanese adult video company
- Athena (retailer), a British art retailer famous for its posters
- Athena Learning Trust, an English multi-academy trust
- Athena Scientific, a science and engineering publishing company co-founded by MIT professor Dimitri Bertsekas
- Athena Technologies, a Virginia-based company specializing in navigation and control systems for unmanned aerial vehicles
- athenahealth, a Massachusetts-based Healthcare technology company

== Arts and entertainment ==
=== Music ===
- Athena (band), a Turkish ska punk band
- Athena (Greek rock band), a Greek rock band
- "Athena" (song), the first track on The Who's 1982 studio album, It's Hard
- "Athena", a song by Tiësto from the album Parade of the Athletes
- "Athena", a song by Greyson Chance from the album Palladium
- "Athena", a song by Nova Twins from the album Who Are the Girls?
- Athenas, Argentine Catholic music singer

=== Video games ===
- Athena (arcade game), a 1986 arcade game made by SNK, whose main character is "Princess Athena"
  - Psycho Soldier, the 1987 sequel to the arcade game, sometimes referred to as Athena 2
  - Athena: Full Throttle, a 2006 sequel to the arcade game
- Athena (game developer), Japanese game developer founded in 1987

=== Other uses in arts and entertainment ===
- Athena (1954 film), an MGM musical
- Athena (2022 film), a French film
- Athena (novel), a 1995 novel by John Banville
- Athena: Goddess of War, a 2010 South Korean television drama series
- Mourning Athena, a Greek relief sculpture dating around c.470 BC
- Athena Parthenos, a Greek statue in the Parthenos
- Athena (comics)

== Ships ==
- Athena (yacht), formerly the largest private sailing yacht in the world
- MV Astoria, cruiseliner formerly "MS Athena", former transatlantic liner Stockholm
- MS Pearl Seaways, cruise-ferry formerly "M/S Athena"
- MS Athina B, coaster that beached at Brighton in 1980, sometimes mis-reported as Athena B
- FV Athena, a supertrawler and factory ship that caught fire in October 2010
- SS Athena, a 1893 Greek steamship

== Science and technology ==
=== Equipment in outer space ===
- Athena (asteroid spacecraft), a small proposed probe to visit Pallas, the asteroid
- Athena (rocket family), Lockheed Martin's series of light rocket boosters
  - Athena I
  - Athena II
- Advanced Telescope for High Energy Astrophysics, a planned space telescope by the ESA
- Athena-Fidus, a French-Italian, military communications satellite
- Athena, the scientific payload on the Mars Exploration Rovers
- Athena, the Nova-C lander that carried out the Intuitive Machines IM-2 lunar landing mission

=== Other uses in science and technology ===
- ATHENA experiment, a CERN antimatter research project
- the ATHENA missile guidance computer for the HGM-25A Titan I intercontinental ballistic missile
- Athena 1, an early laptop
- Project Athena, a project to produce a computing environment for educational use
- Project Athena (Intel), a laptop certification program
- X Athena Widgets, X Window System's widget toolkit
- Advanced Test High Energy Asset, a directed-energy weapon
- Amazon Athena, a database system
- Athena (Battlestar Galactica)

== Other uses ==
- ATHENA (European cultural heritage project) an EU-funded project
- November 2012 nor'easter, referred to by The Weather Channel as Winter Storm Athena
- Operation ATHENA, Canada's involvement in the 2001 War in Afghanistan
- Ulmus parvifolia 'Emer I', an elm cultivar, sold as "Athena"

== See also ==
- Atena (disambiguation)
- Athene (disambiguation)
- Athens (disambiguation)
- Athina (disambiguation)
- Altena (disambiguation)
- SS Athenia
- Aethina, a genus of beetle including the small hive beetle (Aethina tumida)
- Pallas Athena (disambiguation)
- Temple of Athena (disambiguation)
