= Athenae (disambiguation) =

Athenae is another name for the city of Athens. Athenae may also refer to:

- Athenae (Boeotia), town of ancient Boeotia on the river Triton, near Lake Copais
- Athenae Diades, town of ancient Euboea, near the promontory Cenaeum
- Athenae (Pontus), city and port of ancient Pontus, with a Greek temple of Athena
- Conus athenae, a species of sea snail

== See also ==
- Athenea, given name
