= Athenian (disambiguation) =

An Athenian is a citizen or resident of modern Athens or classical Athens. As an adjective, it also refers to anything associated with Athens.

Athenian may also refer to:

- James "Athenian" Stuart (1713–1788), Scottish archaeologist, architect and artist
- Athenian School, a college preparatory and boarding school in Danville, California, United States
- Athenian Motorsports, an American professional stock car racing team from 2014 to 2016
- Athenian League an English amateur football league for clubs in and around London from 1912 to 1984
- The Athenian (magazine), an English-language magazine published in Greece from 1974 to 1993
- Athenian, an American newspaper that was merged into The Daily Post Athenian

== See also ==
- Athens (disambiguation)
- Athene (disambiguation)
- Athena (disambiguation)
