= SS Athen =

Athen (meaning Athens in several languages, including German, Norwegian and Danish) is the name of two German merchant ships:

- SS Athen (1893), German merchant ship lost off Portland Bill in the English Channel in 1906, and now a dive site
- SS Athen (1936), German merchant ship that survived the attack that sank SS Cap Arcona in 1945; afterwards registered in the USSR as General Brusilow and from 1947 in Poland as Waryński.

== See also ==
- Athen family, a noble family of Sardinia during the 11th and 12th centuries
- Atena (disambiguation)
- Athena (disambiguation)
- Athene (disambiguation)
- Athens (disambiguation)
