= Athene (disambiguation) =

Athene or Athena is the shrewd companion of heroes and the goddess of heroic endeavour in Greek mythology.

Athene may also refer to:

- 881 Athene, a main-belt asteroid
- Athene (bird), a genus of small owls
- Athene (Cynuria), a town in ancient Cynuria, Greece
- Athene Glacier, a glacier in Antarctica
- HMS Athene, an aircraft transport
- USS Athene (AKA-22), an Artemis-class attack cargo ship
- Athene (research center), stylized as ATHENE, an IT security research institute in Darmstadt, Germany
- Athene, an insurance company acquired by Apollo Global Management

== People with the given name ==
- Athene Seyler (1889–1990), English actress
- Athene Donald (born 1953), British physicist
- Athene (gamer), pseudonym of Bachir Boumaaza (born 1980), Belgian internet personality

== See also ==
- Altena (disambiguation)
- Atena (disambiguation)
- Athen (disambiguation)
- Athena (disambiguation)
- Athens (disambiguation)
- Athenian (disambiguation)
- Pallas Athene (disambiguation)
- Athenea (given name)
- Atheniella (a genus)
