= Loizides =

Loizides is a surname. Notable people with the surname include:

- Athena Loizides (born 1965), Cypriot television presenter, and food writer
- Louis Loizides, one of the founders of the bachata movement in the Dominican Republic
- Marios Loizides (1928–1988), Cypriot visual artist
- Panayiotis Loizides (footballer) (born 1995), Cypriot footballer
- Panayiotis Loizides (businessman), Cypriot businessman
- Tom Loizides (born 1988), English-born Cypriot rugby player
