= Athens micropolitan area =

The Athens micropolitan area may refer to:

- The Athens, Ohio micropolitan area, United States
- The Athens, Texas micropolitan area, United States
- The Athens, Tennessee micropolitan area, United States

== See also ==
- Athens metropolitan area (disambiguation)
- Athens (disambiguation)
