= Athina Markopoulou =

Greek-American engineer

- Education: Stanford University; National Technical University of Athens
- Scientific career
- Workplaces: University of California, Irvine; Stanford University; Sprint Applied Research & Advanced Technology Labs; Arista Networks
- Thesis: Assessing the quality of multimedia communications over Internet backbone networks (2002)

Athina Markopoulou is a Greek-American engineer who is Professor, Chancellor's Fellow, and chair at the University of California, Irvine. Her research considers internet privacy, data transparency and mobile data analytics. She was elected Fellow of the Institute of Electrical and Electronics Engineers in 2020.

== Early life and education ==
Markopoulou was born in Greece. She attended the National Technical University of Athens for undergraduate studies, where she worked toward a diploma in electrical engineering. She graduated in the top percentile of her class, and moved to the United States for her graduate studies. Markopoulou completed her doctoral research under the supervision of Fouad Tobagi, in which she explored Internet backbone networks. After finishing her doctorate, Markopoulou joined the Sprint Applied Research & Advanced Technology Labs, where she worked on the technical staff. She returned to Stanford University as a postdoctoral researcher in 2003. Markopolou joined the technical staff at Arista Networks in 2005.

== Research and career ==
In 2012, Markopoulou was appointed to the faculty at the University of California, Irvine. Her research group, the UCI Networking Group, considers mobile data analytics, privacy and the internet of things. Markopoulou has looked to understand advertising and tracking services, and train machine learning models for the detection and blocking of advertising. She co-founded Shoelace Wireless, an app that speeds up mobile internet by combining Wi-Fi and cellular networks.

In 2020, Markopoulou was awarded $10 million from the National Science Foundation to study personal information, data and security. The program, ProperData: Protecting Personal Data Flow on the Internet, seeks to protect personal data on mobile devices. She was the first Samueli School of Engineering researcher to be appointed Chancellor's Fellow at the University of California, Irvine in 2019.

== Awards and honors ==
- 2008: National Science Foundation CAREER Award
- 2014: Samueli School Faculty Midcareer Award for Research
- 2017: Orange County Engineering Council Educator Award
- 2019: University of California, Irvine Chancellor's Fellow
- 2020: Elected Fellow of the Institute of Electrical and Electronics Engineers
- 2022: ACM Distinguished Member
- 2025: ACM Fellow

== Selected publications ==
- Gjoka, Minas; Kurant, Maciej; Butts, Carter T.; Markopoulou, Athina (2010). "Walking in Facebook: A Case Study of Unbiased Sampling of OSNs". 2010 Proceedings IEEE INFOCOM. IEEE. pp. 1–9. doi:10.1109/infcom.2010.5462078. ISBN 978-1-4244-5836-3. S2CID 12840167.
- Markopoulou, A.; Iannaccone, G.; Bhattacharyya, S.; Chen-Nee Chuah; Diot, C. (2004). "Characterization of failures in an IP backbone". IEEE Infocom 2004. Vol. 4. IEEE. pp. 2307–2317. doi:10.1109/infcom.2004.1354653. ISBN 0-7803-8355-9. S2CID 1411104.
- Markopoulou, A.; Iannaccone, G.; Bhattacharyya, S.; Chen-Nee Chuah; Ganjali, Y.; Diot, C. (2008). "Characterization of Failures in an Operational IP Backbone Network". IEEE/ACM Transactions on Networking. 16 (4): 749–762. doi:10.1109/tnet.2007.902727. ISSN 1063-6692. S2CID 11730180.
