= Athina (disambiguation) =

Athina is an alternate spelling for Athena as well as a transliteration of the Modern Greek name of Athens.

Athina may also refer to:

- Athina language, Australia
- MS Athina B, coaster that beached at Brighton in 1980
- Storm Athina

== People with the given name ==
- Athina Livanos (1929–1974), Greek daughter of shipping magnate Stavros Livanos
- Athina Onassis (born 1985), French-Greek granddaughter of shipping magnate Aristotle Onassis
- Athina Papafotiou (born 1989), Greek volleyball player
- Athina Papayianni (born 1980), Greek race walker
- Athina Markopoulou, Greek-American engineer

== See also ==
- Athena (disambiguation)
