= Altena (surname) =

Altena or Van Altena is a Dutch toponymic surname. Altena is the name of at least six locations in the Low Countries, as well as several in neighboring Germany. At least one family traces the name back to the Land van Altena, now in North Brabant. People with the name include:

- Bob Altena (born 1986), Dutch decathlete
- Ernst van Altena (1933–1999), Dutch poet, writer and translator
- Jordi Altena (born 2003), Dutch footballer
- Klaus Altena (born 1962), German rower
- Maarten Altena (born 1943), Dutch composer
- Marius van Altena (born 1938), Dutch tenor

== See also ==
- 2370 van Altena, main belt asteroid named after Willem van Altena, Dutch-born American astronomer
- De Borchgrave d'Altena, noble family from 's-Hertogenbosch
- Calliostoma altena, sea snail named after Dutch curator Carel O. van Regteren Altena (1907–1976)
