= Athens metropolitan area (disambiguation) =

The Athens metropolitan area may refer to:

- The Athens metropolitan area in the Attica region of Greece
- The Athens, Georgia, metropolitan area in the United States

== See also ==
- Athens micropolitan area (disambiguation)
- Athens (disambiguation)
