= Tom Ravenscroft =

British radio presenter and disc jockey (born 1980)

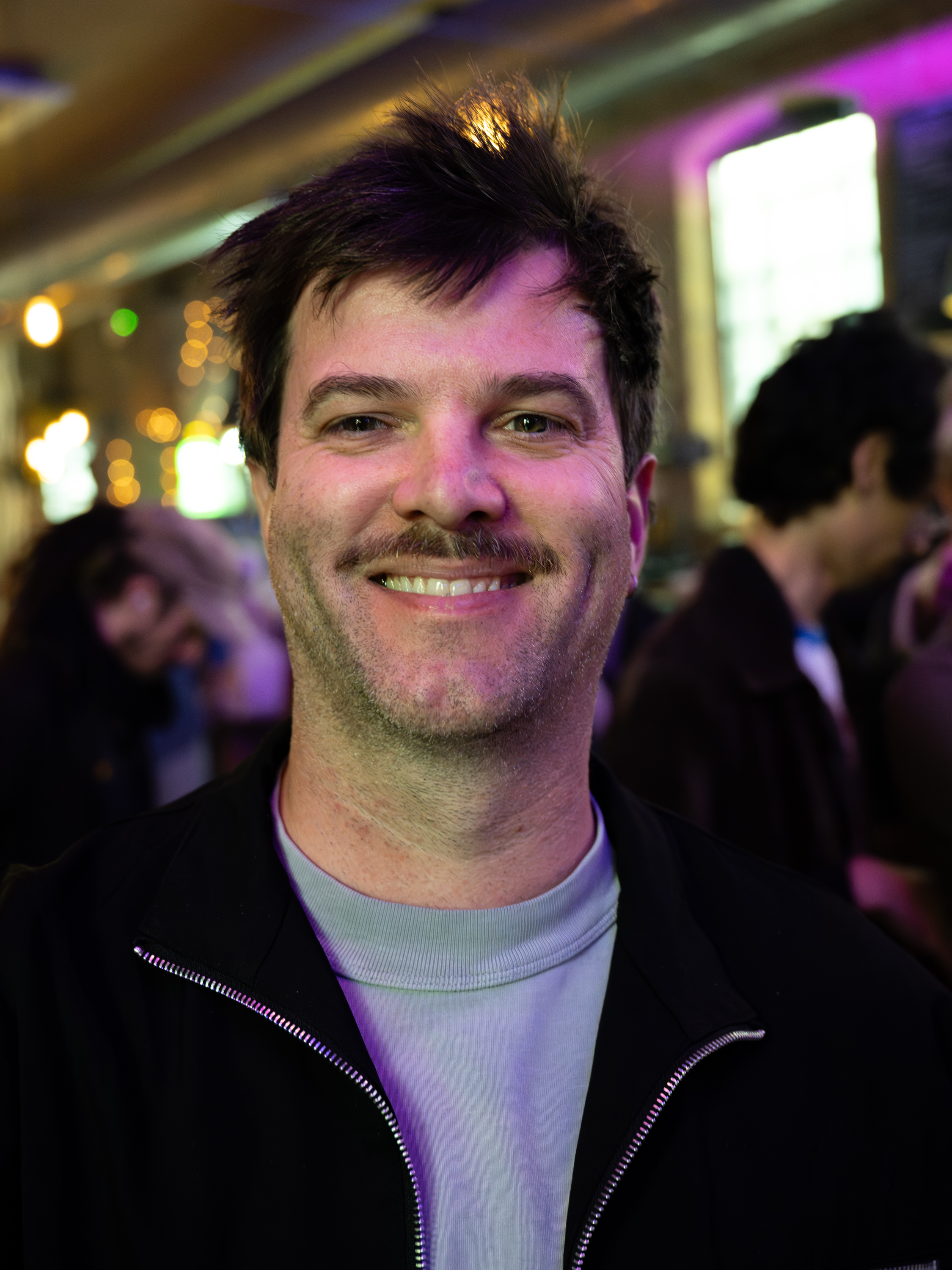
- Ravenscroft at the 2025 SXSW London festival in London, England
- Born: Thomas James Dalglish Ravenscroft; 6 February 1980 (age 46)
- Occupations: Radio presenter, DJ
- Father: John Peel

Thomas James Dalglish Ravenscroft (born 6 February 1980) is a British radio presenter and disc jockey. He previously hosted a BBC Radio 6 Music show featuring new and unsigned music. He is the son of the late DJ John Peel.

== Career ==
Working initially in TV as a production assistant, Ravenscroft also developed as a journalist researching new music.

Following the death of his father, John Peel, in 2004, Ravenscroft was involved as researcher with the Channel 4 television documentary John Peel's Record Box and, with his mother Sheila and other members of the family, in the completion of his father's autobiography Margrave of the Marshes, unfinished at his death.

In November 2005, to coincide with John Peel's posthumous induction into the UK Music Hall of Fame, Ravenscroft organised the production and release of a tribute single to him, a cover version of one of Peel's favourite songs, Buzzcocks's Ever Fallen in Love. Alongside the song's original vocalist, Pete Shelley, the record featured an eclectic line-up of musicians hand-picked by Ravenscroft, all of whom his father had played prior to their success and in some cases for the first time on radio. This line-up included Robert Plant of Led Zeppelin, Roger Daltrey of The Who, David Gilmour of Pink Floyd, Peter Hook from New Order, Andy Gill of Gang of Four, Elton John and Jeff Beck alongside newer artists including The Futureheads, the Soledad Brothers, El Presidente and The Datsuns.

Peel had once described the majority of music radio output in Britain as "predictable porridge", and from 2005 Ravenscroft was involved with his brother William in developing a service for unsigned acts. By 2007 it had become a web portal, Unpredictable Porridge (now defunct but partially archived), whose partnership arrangement with Universal Music allowed new acts to submit their material online directly to A&R managers at the record label.

In August 2006, Channel 4 signed Ravenscroft to present a weekly show, SlashMusic, on its short-lived digital station 4Radio. The show, interacting with a website hosting music uploaded by unsigned bands, involved Ravenscroft in research but, as media consultant Paul Robinson noted in The Guardian, the show's scripted format stilted his developing presentation style ensuring that "he delivers his lines at breakneck speed, obviously reading, which rather loses the sense of personal recommendation and intimacy". Ravenscroft also presented the New Music Download podcast for the station's website.

After the closure of 4Radio in 2007, Ravenscroft was commissioned by Five Culture, a partnership of Channel Five and Arts Council England, to narrate four episodes in Channel 5's My Music strand devoted to folk musicians Seth Lakeman, Kate Rusby, Eliza Carthy and Athena.

In June 2010, having previously appeared as a fill-in presenter for absent hosts including Tom Robinson, Ravenscroft took over the Friday night slot on BBC Radio 6 Music vacated by musician Bruce Dickinson. Paul Rodgers, then 6 Music's editor at the BBC, greeted Ravenscroft's appointment, describing him as "a great young broadcaster with all the knowledge, passion and articulacy that you might expect from someone of his lineage". Ravenscroft joined the station during a threat of closure, but an audience surge, alongside a campaign website hosted by the British Phonographic Industry, ultimately secured its survival. Since 2014 Ravenscroft has also hosted a weekly midnight slot as part of the nightly 6 Music Recommends show, which features new music edited by several of the station's DJs.

In 2011, Ravenscroft introduced the inaugural "John Peel Lecture" given by Pete Townshend. He also became presenter for Channel 4's Abbey Road Debuts series featuring hotly tipped new acts performing at the fabled London studios.

In September 2013, Ravenscroft curated a week-long series of new music events, In the Court of Tom Ravenscroft, at the MAC centre in Belfast. In October 2017, Ravenscroft DJed alongside Underworld's Rick Smith at a preshow event for an Underworld concert in the Passage of the Rijksmuseum in Amsterdam.

In May 2025 he announced that he would be leaving BBC 6 Music at the end of the month. He now presents a weekly show on Rinse FM.

In March 2026 he joined Australian Broadcasting Corporation digital radio station Double J presenting Friday mornings.

== Personal life ==
Ravenscroft is the son of BBC Radio 1 disc jockey John Peel and his wife Sheila Gilhooly.
