= Juniper Springs, Nevada =

Juniper Springs
- Ghost town
- Approximate location in Nevada
- Coordinates: 38°37′N 117°50′W
- Country: United States
- State: Nevada
- Counties: Nye
- Founded: 1910
- Merged: 1910

Population
  - Total: 0

Juniper Springs (also called Juniper) is a former mining camp in Nye County, Nevada, that was inhabited in 1910. The mining camp was founded in the summer of 1910 on the location where N. E. Dyer had found ore. The camp was founded close to the competing camp Athens. Juniper Springs was owned by Dyer, who gave away free lots. In Athens, lots were sold for $50 and $75. The Juniper Lodging House and a store, that was owned by Guy Eckley, were the first businesses to open in Juniper Springs. On July 9, 1910, the Athens Mining District, that comprised Juniper Springs and Athens, was organized at a meeting with over fifty attendees. Juniper Springs and Athens merged in 1910 and the newly created mining camp was given the name Athens. Athens was populated until 1939.
