= Pallas Athena (disambiguation) =

Athena, often given the epithet Pallas, is an ancient Greek goddess of wisdom.

Pallas Athena may also refer to:

- Advanced Telescope for High Energy Astrophysics (ATHENA), a planned space telescope
- Pallas Athena (song), a song by David Bowie from the 1993 album Black Tie White Noise
- Pallas Athena (Klimt), a 1898 painting by Gustav Klimt
- Pallas Athena (Rembrandt), a c. 1657 painting by Rembrandt
- SS Flandre (1951), a former ship of the French Line rechristened the Pallas Athena as its final name

== See also ==
- Athena (disambiguation)
- Pallas (disambiguation)
