= You Want It Darker =

Studio album by Leonard Cohen
- Released: October 21, 2016
- Recorded: April 2015 – July 2016
- Studio: Leonard Cohen's house in Mid-Wilshire, Los Angeles
- Genre: Folk rock
- Length: 36:07
- Label: Columbia
- Producers: Adam Cohen; Patrick Leonard

Leonard Cohen chronology
Can't Forget: A Souvenir of the Grand Tour (2015)	You Want It Darker (2016)	Thanks for the Dance (2019)

Singles from You Want It Darker
- 1. "You Want It Darker" Released: September 21, 2016; 2. "Traveling Light" Released: February 23, 2017

You Want It Darker is the fourteenth studio album by Canadian singer-songwriter Leonard Cohen, released on October 21, 2016, by Columbia Records, 17 days before Cohen's death. The album was created at the end of his life and focuses on death, God, and humor. It was released to critical acclaim. The title track was awarded a Grammy Award for Best Rock Performance in January 2018. It was Cohen's last album released during his lifetime and was followed by the posthumous album Thanks for the Dance in November 2019.

== Background ==
After touring extensively between 2008 and 2013, Leonard Cohen began to suffer "multiple fractures of the spine" among other physical problems, according to his son Adam Cohen. Due to Leonard Cohen's mobility issues, You Want It Darker was recorded in the living room of his home in Mid-Wilshire, Los Angeles and then sent by e-mail to his musical collaborators.

Cohen has said his condition helped him eliminate any distractions during the recording of the album: "In a certain sense, this particular predicament is filled with many fewer distractions than other times in my life and actually enables me to work with a little more concentration and continuity than when I had duties of making a living, being a husband, being a father". Despite his medical condition, Adam Cohen said that "occasionally, in bouts of joy, he would even, through his pain, stand up in front of the speakers, and we'd repeat a song over and over like teenagers".

== Music ==
Musically, the album is "a little bit more sparse and acoustic" compared to his recent albums, according to Adam Cohen. Blues dominates the album. Due to the fact that Cohen's Jewish faith was important to him, he invited Cantor Gideon Zelermyer and Shaar Hashomayim Choir, from his childhood synagogue in Quebec to join him on the album.

== Critical reception ==
Professional ratings
Aggregate scores
Source	Rating
AnyDecentMusic?	8.8/10
Metacritic	92/100
Review scores
Source	Rating
AllMusic	4/5 stars
The A.V. Club	B+
Chicago Tribune	3.5/4 stars
The Daily Telegraph	5/5 stars
Entertainment Weekly	A−
The Guardian	5/5 stars
The Independent	4/5 stars
Pitchfork	8.5/10
Rolling Stone	4/5 stars
Vice (Expert Witness)	A−

You Want It Darker received widespread acclaim from music critics. At Metacritic, which assigns a normalized rating out of 100 to reviews from mainstream critics, the album received an average score of 92, which indicates "universal acclaim", based on 28 reviews.

=== Accolades ===
Publication	Accolade	Year	Rank
The A.V. Club	The A.V. Club's Top 50 Albums of 2016	2016	11
The Independent	Best Albums of 2016	2016	3
Mojo	The 50 Best Albums of 2016	2016	5
Paste	The 50 Best Albums of 2016	2016	17
Pitchfork	The 50 Best Albums of 2016	2016	17
Pitchfork	The 200 Best Albums of the 2010s	2019	118
Rolling Stone	50 Best Albums of 2016	2016	9
Stereogum	The 50 Best Albums of 2016	2016	34
The Wire	Top 50 Releases of the Year	2016	22

== Commercial performance ==
In Canada, You Want It Darker debuted atop the album charts, with 19,400 in traditional sales and a total of 20,000 units. The album occupied the top position for three consecutive weeks and sold 106,000 units by the end of the year in Canada. In the United States, You Want It Darker debuted at number 10 on the Billboard 200 with 25,000 units, 24,000 of which were pure album sales. It is Cohen's second American top 10 album. In the United Kingdom, the album debuted at number four on the UK Albums Chart, selling 20,330 copies in its first week and becoming Leonard Cohen's fifth top 10 album in the UK. The album reached No. 1 on the Flemish Albums Chart and stayed there for 7 weeks.

== Track listing ==
All lyrics are written by Leonard Cohen.

No.	Title	Music	Producer(s)	Length
1.	"You Want It Darker"	Patrick Leonard	Adam Cohen	4:44
2.	"Treaty"	L. Cohen	Leonard	4:02
3.	"On the Level"	Sharon Robinson	A. Cohen	3:27
4.	"Leaving the Table"	L. Cohen	A. Cohen	3:47
5.	"If I Didn't Have Your Love"	Leonard	Leonard	3:35
6.	"Traveling Light"	Leonard; A. Cohen	A. Cohen	4:22
7.	"It Seemed the Better Way"	Leonard	A. Cohen	4:21
8.	"Steer Your Way"	L. Cohen	A. Cohen	4:23
9.	"String Reprise / Treaty"	L. Cohen	Leonard	3:26
Total length:				36:09

== Personnel ==
- Leonard Cohen – vocals
- Athena Andreadis – background vocals on "Traveling Light"
- Bill Bottrell – electric guitar, pedal steel guitar
- Michael Chaves – keyboards, bass guitar, drum programming
- Adam Cohen – classical guitar
- Dana Glover – background vocals on "On the Level" and "Steer Your Way"
- Alison Krauss – background vocals on "Steer Your Way"
- Patrick Leonard – keyboards, organ, piano, bass synthesizer, bass guitar, percussion, drum programming
- Howard Bilerman – engineer on "You Want It Darker" and "It Seemed the Better Way"
- Rob Humphreys – drums
- Brian MacLeod – drums
- Shaar Hashomayim Synagogue Choir (Roï Azoulay, Director; Cantor Gideon Zelermyer, vocal soloist)
- Zac Rae – guitar, classical guitar, mandolin, keyboards, Mellotron, celesta, piano, Wurlitzer, floor tom, octophone

== Charts ==
=== Weekly charts ===
Chart (2016)	Peak position
Australian Albums (ARIA)	2
Austrian Albums (Ö3 Austria)	1
Belgian Albums (Ultratop Flanders)	1
Belgian Albums (Ultratop Wallonia)	1
Canadian Albums (Billboard)	1
Czech Albums (ČNS IFPI)	1
Danish Albums (Hitlisten)	1
Dutch Albums (Album Top 100)	1
Finnish Albums (Suomen virallinen lista)	7
French Albums (SNEP)	3
German Albums (Offizielle Top 100)	2
Greek Albums (IFPI Greece)	12
Hungarian Albums (MAHASZ)	5
Irish Albums (IRMA)	1
Italian Albums (FIMI)	8
South Korean Albums (Circle)	87
South Korean International Albums (Circle)	12
New Zealand Albums (RMNZ)	1
Norwegian Albums (VG-lista)	1
Polish Albums (ZPAV)	1
Portuguese Albums (AFP)	1
Scottish Albums (Official Charts)	4
Spanish Albums (PROMUSICAE)	3
Swedish Albums (Sverigetopplistan)	1
Swiss Albums (Schweizer Hitparade)	2
Taiwanese Albums (Five Music)	14
UK Albums (Official Charts)	4
US Billboard 200	7
US Top Rock Albums (Billboard)	1

=== Year-end charts ===
Chart (2016)	Position
Australian Albums (ARIA)	42
Austrian Albums (Ö3 Austria)	7
Belgian Albums (Ultratop Flanders)	4
Belgian Albums (Ultratop Wallonia)	26
Danish Albums (Hitlisten)	37
Dutch Albums (MegaCharts)	9
French Albums (SNEP)	46
German Albums (Offizielle Top 100)	22
Icelandic Albums (Plötutíóindi)	35
Italian Albums (FIMI)	88
New Zealand Albums (RMNZ)	20
Polish Albums (ZPAV)	5
Spanish Albums (PROMUSICAE)	29
Swedish Albums (Sverigetopplistan)	30
Swiss Albums (Schweizer Hitparade)	9
UK Albums (OCC)	53
US Top Rock Albums (Billboard)	75
Chart (2017)	Position
Belgian Albums (Ultratop Flanders)	16
Belgian Albums (Ultratop Wallonia)	86
Canadian Albums (Billboard)	17
Dutch Albums (MegaCharts)	60
Spanish Albums (PROMUSICAE)	69
Swiss Albums (Schweizer Hitparade)	34
US Top Rock Albums (Billboard)	44
Chart (2019)	Position
Belgian Albums (Ultratop Flanders)	151

== Certifications ==
Certifications for You Want It Darker
Region	Certification	Certified units/sales
Australia (ARIA)	Gold	35,000^{^}
Austria (IFPI Austria)	Platinum	15,000^{*}
Belgium (BRMA)	Platinum	30,000^{*}
Canada (Music Canada)	Platinum	80,000^{‡}
Denmark (IFPI Danmark)	Platinum	20,000^{‡}
France (SNEP)	Platinum	100,000^{‡}
Germany (BVMI)	Platinum	200,000^{‡}
Hungary (MAHASZ)	Gold	1,000^{^}
New Zealand (RMNZ)	Gold	7,500^{‡}
Poland (ZPAV)	3× Platinum	60,000^{‡}
Spain (Promusicae)	Gold	20,000^{‡}
Sweden (GLF)	Gold	20,000^{‡}
Switzerland (IFPI Switzerland)	Platinum	20,000^{^}
United Kingdom (BPI)	Gold	153,460
Summaries
Worldwide	—	1,100,000
^{*} Sales figures based on certification alone.^{^} Shipments figures based on certification alone.^{‡} Sales+streaming figures based on certification alone.
