= Athenea =

Athenea is a feminine given name.

People with the name include:

- Athenea del Castillo (born 2000), Spanish professional footballer
- Athenea Pérez (born 1996), Spanish model and beauty pageant titleholder crowned Miss Universe Spain 2023

== See also ==
- Athena (given name)
- Athenae (disambiguation)
- Athenia, ships with the name
- Atenea, an academic journal
