= Triton River =

River draining into Lake Copais

The Triton River in Boeotia, Greece ran into Lake Copais. The towns of Athenae and Eleusis were located on the river and were both destroyed in an inundation.

A temple to Athena was located on the river in the town of Alalcomenae.
