= Temple of Athena (disambiguation) =

The Temple of Athena is the Parthenon on the Athenian Acropolis in Greece.

Temple of Athena may also refer to:

- Temple of Athena (Paestum)
- Temple of Athena (Syracuse)
- Temple of Athena Alea, at Tegea, Greece
- Temple of Athena Lindia, on Rhodos, Greece
- Temple of Athena Nike, also on the Athenian Acropolis

== See also ==
- Old Temple of Athena, which preceded the Parthenon on the Athenian Acropolis
- Athena (disambiguation)
