= Athena (comics) =

Athena, in comics, may refer to:

- Athena (DC Comics), a DC Comics character, Pallas Athena
- Athena (Marvel Comics), a Marvel Comics character and member of the Olympian Gods
- Thena, another Marvel Comics character who has gone by the name Athena, a member of the Eternals
- Athena, an Image Comics character, Lily Nalin, and member of Bloodstrike
- Athena, a Marvel UK character and member of the Warheads
- Athena, a comic book series from Dynamite Entertainment

== See also ==
- Athena (disambiguation)
