= ATHENA (European cultural heritage project) =

European Union funded project which aims to provide content to Europeana

ATHENA is a European Union funded project which aims to provide content to Europeana. It is led by the Italian Ministry of Culture, and "takes its origins from the existing MINERVA network."
