= Spyros Vassiliou =

Greek painter, printmaker, illustrator, and stage designer

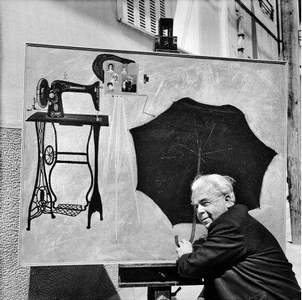
- Spyros Vassiliou.
- Born: June 16, 1903; Galaxidi, Greece
- Died: March 22, 1985 (aged 81)
- Education: Athens School of Fine Arts
- Known for: Painting, illustrations, wood carving, stage and costume designs
- Children: 2

Spyros Vassiliou (Greek: Σπύρος Βασιλείου; June 16, 1903 – March 22, 1985) was a Greek painter, printmaker, illustrator, and stage designer. He became widely recognized for his work starting in the 1930s, when he received the Benaki Prize from the Athens Academy. The recipient of a Guggenheim Prize for Greece (in 1960), Spyros Vassiliou's works have been exhibited in galleries throughout Europe, in the United States, and Canada.

== Art ==
The townsmen of Galaxidi, where Vassiliou was born, collected money to send him to Athens in 1921, to study at the Athens School of Fine Arts under teachers Alexandros Kaloudis and Nikolaos Lytras. In 1929, Vassiliou held his first individual exhibition, and in 1930 he was awarded the Benaki Prize for his design of Saint Dionysios Church in Kolonaki, Athens. During this time he was also a founding member of the art groups ”Techni" and "Stathmi". He represented Greece at the Venice Biennale in 1934 and 1964, exhibited in Alexandria in 1957, and at the São Paulo Art Biennial in 1959. In 1955 he designed and painted the interior of Saint Konstantinos Orthodox church of Detroit. In 1960 he was awarded the Solomon R. Guggenheim National Section Award for his painting "Lights and Shadows". In 1975 and 1983 his work was presented in a retrospective exhibition in the National Art Gallery and Alexandros Soutzos Museum.

Spyros Vassiliou became recognized as a painter of the transformation of the modern urban environment, depicting with an unwavering eye the sprawl of urban development that surrounded his home in Athens, under the walls of the Parthenon. His artistic identity combined monochrome backgrounds and the unorthodox positioning of objects. He paid homage to the Byzantine icon by floating symbols of everyday Greek life on washes of gold or sea-blue color, very much like the religious symbols that float on gold in religious art. With oils and watercolours, he painted natural and urban space, portraits, still-life, and scenes of daily living, combining selective elements of cubism and impressionism. A member of an important community of Greek artists in the mid-20th century, Vassiliou was known as one of the first Greek pop-art painters.

== Other activities ==
For many years Vassiliou taught theatre. As early as 1927 he designed sets and costumes for the stage. He also worked in film. Well known projects include Michalis Kakoyiannis' 1962 adaptation of Euripides, and Elektra, starring Irene Papas and close friend Manos Katrakis.

During the years of the German occupation of Greece (1941-1945), when painting supplies were scarce, Vassiliou turned to engraving and woodcuts. Works such as The Burial of Palamas and The Mourning of the Kalavrytans (1943) became famous in Greece as symbols of freedom. His activity during those years also included the illustration and underground publication of three manuscript volumes as well as woodcut prints for magazines.

Over the years, dozens of Vassiliou's illustrations and paintings were printed on covers of books and magazines including The Athenian (magazine) and children's magazine To Rodi, where he also critiqued children's drawings.

The Greek National Tourism Organization used ones of Vassiliou illustrations, the "Island of Poros", as a promotional poster for Greece in 1948.

== Atelier Spyros Vassiliou ==
The home and studio of Spyros Vassiliou opened to the public as a Museum in June 2004 with the help of the Hellenic Ministry of Culture. The Museum portrayed the artistic heritage of one of the most acclaimed painters of Modern Greek art by displaying a large number of his works – paintings and theatrical designs - in the home where the artist lived. The building is located blocks away from the ancient Odeon of Herodes Atticus, and the Acropolis of Athens but has closed its operation as a museum since February 2016.

== Spyros Vassiliou Archive ==
The Spyros Vassiliou Archive is maintained by ARTIFEX, a non-profit organization which preserves and promotes Spyros Vassiliou's work.
