= Eleusis (Boeotia) =

Ancient town in Boeotia, Greece

Eleusis (Ancient Greek: Ἐλευσίς) was a town of ancient Boeotia, on the river Triton, and near Lake Copais. Eleusis, along with the neighbouring town of Athenae, was destroyed by an inundation.
