= You Want It Darker (song) =

Single by Leonard Cohen

from the album You Want It Darker
- Released: September 21, 2016
- Length: 3:48
- Label: Columbia
- Composer: Patrick Leonard
- Lyricist: Leonard Cohen
- Producers: Adam Cohen; Patrick Leonard

"You Want It Darker" is a song by Canadian poet and musician Leonard Cohen, released on September 21, 2016, Cohen's 82nd birthday. It is the title track from Cohen's album You Want It Darker. The song earned the artist a Grammy Award for Best Rock Performance and features the vocals of Cantor Gideon Zelermyer and Shaar Hashomayim Choir.

Alexis Petridis describes the song as "a menacing critique of religion" that "flips from anger to resigned acceptance and back again". Far Out and American Songwriter ranked the song number seven and number three, respectively, on their lists of the 10 greatest Leonard Cohen songs.

The song was recorded by Iggy Pop for the 2022 tribute album Here It Is: A Tribute to Leonard Cohen.

The background choir vocals from this song are used as a sample in the track "Death of Love" from an electronic music producer James Blake.

== Charts ==
Chart performance for "You Want It Darker"
Chart (2016)	Peak position
Austria (Ö3 Austria Top 40)	33
Belgium (Ultratop 50 Flanders)	29
Canada Hot 100 (Billboard)	73
Netherlands (Single Top 100)	33
France (SNEP)	76
Germany (GfK)	81
Sweden (Sverigetopplistan)	52
Switzerland (Schweizer Hitparade)	27
US Hot Rock & Alternative Songs (Billboard)	22
