= Athena (Battlestar Galactica) =

Athena is the name of multiple characters in the fictional Battlestar Galactica science fiction universe.

- Lieutenant Athena, a bridge officer in the 1978–79 television series Battlestar Galactica
- Number Eight (Battlestar Galactica), a humanoid Cylon in the 2004–09 television series Battlestar Galactica, one copy of whom uses the call sign "Athena"

== See also ==
- Athena (disambiguation)
