= Atena =

Atena may refer to:

== People ==
- Atena Daemi (born 1988), Iranian civil rights activist, children's rights activist, human rights activist, and political prisoner
- Atena Farghadani (born 1987), Iranian artist and political activist
- Atena Pashko (1931-2012), Ukrainian chemical engineer, poet, and social activist
- Athenas Argentinian Catholic music singer

== Other ==
- Oenomaus atena, species of butterfly of the family Lycaenidae
- Atena Lucana, an Italian municipality in the province of Salerno
- Atena Poznań, Polish women's football club

== See also ==
- Athena (disambiguation)
- Athene (disambiguation)
- Athens (disambiguation)
- Altena (disambiguation)
