= Athena Xenidou =

Cypriot producer, writer and director

Athena Xenidou is a Cypriot producer, writer and director. She is the co-founder of XMAS Productions, a company aiming at producing entertainment for local and international distribution. Xenidou is now in development of Socrates & Soc, a feature-length animated film. She has co-written the screenplay with Barry Cook (director of Walt Disney's Mulan), and she is to co-direct the film once in production.

== Education ==
After receiving a Diploma in Music from the Associated Board of the Royal Schools of Music, London, Xenidou went on to study English Literature, Music and Theatre for two years at the University of Fribourg in Switzerland. Xenidou then moved to Los Angeles and in 1996 she received her BA in Film Studies at the University of California, Santa Barbara. During her studies at the University of California, she co-produced Dead End, her first short film, which received 'Best Project in Humanities and Arts at the University of California' award. She then wrote and directed her own short film, The Made Guy, which received Best Cinematography award at the UCSB Short Film Festival. After graduation, she produced another short film, Tripwire, with the American Film Institute in Los Angeles.

== Work ==
She worked as Art Director in feature films starring Maurizzio Migheli and Bad City Blues, starring Dennis Hopper. In 2001, she produced and directed her first feature film, Unwitnessed Memories which won the Special Jury Remi Award at WorldFest-Houston International Film Festival, the oldest film festival in the USA. Unwitnessed Memories was an Official Selection and received Special Mentions at festivals around the world, such as the Int'l Human rights film festival in Prague, the Int'l Festival of Visual Arts in Hungary, the Thessaloniki International Film Festival, Greece, Viewpoint Int'l Documentary Film Festival in Belgium and the International Documentary Film Festival Amsterdam. It won Best Documentary at the Film Festival in Cyprus and was also an International Emmy Awards semi-finalist. In 2003, she accepted an offer from Fremantle SA, to direct reality TV series in Athens, Greece. She directed two seasons of Survivor and two seasons of The Farm, two of the most popular shows in Greek television history.

== General ==
Xenidou was a member of the jury for the International Emmy Awards from 2001 to 2006. In 2004 she was invited by the European Union as a film professional at the Cannes Film Festival.

Since 2007, Xenidou has been working mostly in theatre. Her collaboration with the Cyprus National Theatre –directing The Shadow Box – resulted in receiving Best Male Actor Award at the National Theatre Awards. She then went on to direct The Vagina Monologues. She is now to direct Art.

== Filmography ==
- DEAD END – producer
- THE MADE GUY – producer/writer/director
- TRIPWIRE – producer
- UNWITNESSED MEMORIES – producer/writer/director
