= Athena Aktipis =

American psychologist

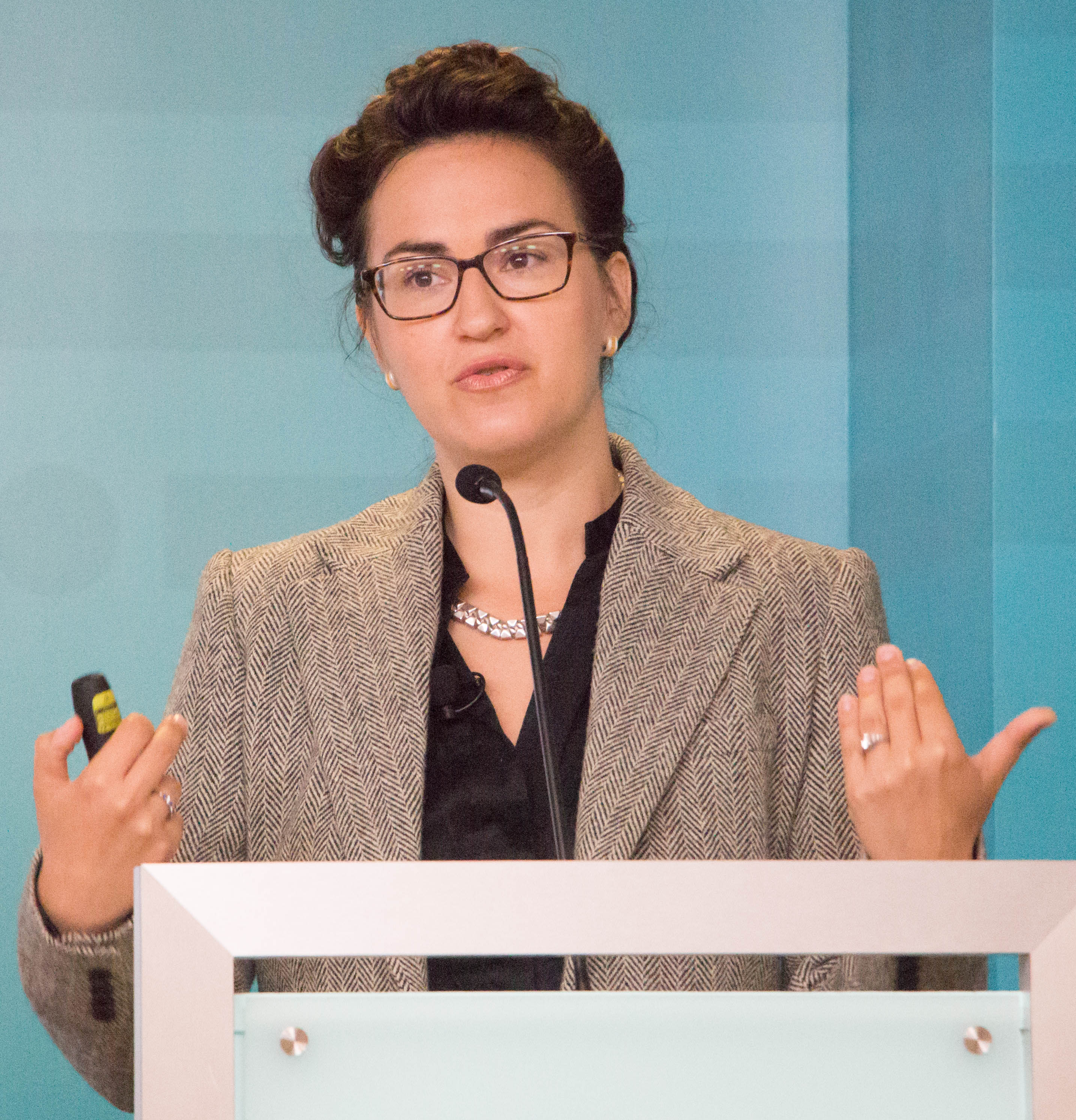
- Aktipis in 2017
- Education: Reed College – BA (psychology, 2002) University of Pennsylvania – MA (psychology, 2004) and PhD (psychology, 2008)
- Occupation: Professor
- Employer: Arizona State University
- Known for: Psychology; biology; cancer research
- Website: athenaaktipis.org

Christina Athena Aktipis is an associate professor in the department of psychology at Arizona State University. She is the director of the Interdisciplinary Cooperation Initiative and the co-director of the Human Generosity Project. She is also the director of the Cooperation and Conflict lab at Arizona State, vice president of the International Society for Evolution, Ecology and Cancer (ISEEC), and former director of human and social evolution and co-founder of the Center for Evolution and Cancer at UCSF. She is a cooperation theorist, an evolutionary biologist, an evolutionary psychologist, and a cancer biologist who works at the intersection of those fields. Aktipis is the author of the books The Cheating Cell: How Evolution Helps Us Understand and Treat Cancer (2020) and A Field Guide to the Apocalypse: A Mostly Serious Guide to Surviving Our Wild Times (2024). She hosts Zombified, a podcast that discusses the science of zombification in daily life. The podcast is an extension of the Zombie Apocalypse Medicine Meeting (ZAMM), a biannual conference chaired by Aktipis. ZAMM is an interdisciplinary conference where art, science, and medicine come together with the aim of solving complex issues.

== Career ==
Aktipis earned a B.A. in psychology from Reed College in 2002. She obtained an M.A. in 2004 and a Ph.D. in 2008 in psychology from the University of Pennsylvania. In 2011, she completed a postdoctoral fellowship in ecology and evolutionary biology at the University of Arizona. Between 2011 and 2014, Aktipis was an assistant research professor in the department of psychology at Arizona State University while also serving as director of human and social evolution at the Center for Evolution and Cancer, at the University of California, San Francisco. During 2013–2014, she was a fellow of the Institute for Advanced Study, Berlin Institute for Advanced Study. Upon her return to the United States, Aktipis and her colleague Lee Cronk, a professor in the department of anthropology at Rutgers University, co-founded the Human Generosity Project. Since 2015, Aktipis holds an appointment as an assistant professor in the department of psychology at Arizona State.

== Projects ==
=== Cooperation in the Apocalypse ===
The Cooperation in the Apocalypse team, which includes Aktipis, brings together interdisciplinary scientists to examine human behavior in times of crisis and panic, such as the COVID-19 pandemic. The team started collecting data in March 2020, a few weeks before the United States went into lockdown, asking questions about mask-wearing behaviors, risk-taking behaviors, exercise routines, mental health, friendships, outdoor recreation, and more.

=== Interdisciplinary Cooperation Initiative ===
The ASU Interdisciplinary Cooperation Initiative brings together scholars from across disciplines who are joined by a shared interest in understanding the fundamental principles that drive cooperation. It holds workshops and working-group meetings with faculty in and outside of ASU, organizes a biannual Cooperation and Conflict Symposium, and the Interdisciplinary Study of Cooperation Winter School, taught by cooperation researchers. In addition to supporting the interdisciplinary study of cooperation, it also supports broader ventures to cultivate cooperation among disciplines. Aktipis hosts a series of interactive livestreams joined by cooperation scientists.

=== Human Generosity Project ===
A large focus of Aktipis' work is cooperation in humans, focusing especially on helping behavior that occurs in times of need. Aktipis co-directs the Human Generosity Project with Lee Cronk of Rutgers University. Together with their team, Aktipis and Cronk study the relationship between biological and cultural influences on human generosity by using multiple methodologies such as field work, laboratory experiments, and computational models.

=== Microbiome and human behavior ===
Microbes have access to many systems underlying human behavior. In her lab, Aktipis and colleagues explore how the microbiome may play a role in eating and social behaviors.

=== Kombucha ===
Kombucha is a drink made by the fermentation of tea by symbiotic bacteria and yeast. Aktipis uses this beverage to explore microbial resource exchange and to determine whether kombucha symbiosis is able to fight off pathogens that single species of microbes cannot.

=== Cancer and multicellular cooperation ===
Multicellular bodies are societies of cells that must cooperate and coordinate to contribute to organism fitness. Cancer represents a breakdown of multicellular cooperation. Aktipis examines cancer through this lens, using evolutionary theory, computational modeling, and clinical collaborations. Her most recent work on cancer is through the Arizona Cancer and Evolution Center, where she co-leads Project 1: Organismal Evolution and Cancer Defenses and the Outreach Unit.

=== Zombified podcast ===
Aktipis hosts the educational podcast Zombified, in which she talks about ways in which we are vulnerable to be controlled by organisms and factors outside ourselves and what that means for our future. It features interviews with ASU psychology department faculty, other ASU faculty, and scholars from outside ASU talking about forces beyond our control that affect our behavior. It covers diverse disciplines, including evolutionary biology, psychology, parasitology, microbiology, computer science, and more.

=== Channel Zed ===
Aktipis has created an educational TV channel in response to the challenges of hosting an in-person conference during the COVID-19 pandemic. Channel Zed is home to interactive livestream shows about how to survive and thrive in the apocalypse. As a think tank where scholars, artists, practitioners, and thought leaders come together, Channel Zed provides opportunities to grapple with humanity's most challenging threats while celebrating examples of resilience and strength. Channel Zed covers current events, lifestyle programming, emergency medicine and survival, history, culture, and other topics.

== Selected publications ==
- May, A., Narayanan, S., Joe Alcock, J., Arvind Varsani, A., Maley, C. & Aktipis, A. (2019). "Kombucha: A novel model system for cooperation and conflict in a complex multi-species microbial ecosystem". PeerJ. 7 e7565. Bibcode:2019PeerJ...7e7565M. doi:10.7717/peerj.7565. PMC 6730531. PMID 31534844.
- Aktipis, A., Cronk, L., Alcock, J., Ayers, J.D., Baciu, C., Balliet, D., Boddy, A.M., Curry, O.S., Krems, J.A., Muñoz, A., Sullivan, D., Sznycer, D., Wilkinson, G.S. & Winfrey, P. (2018). "Understanding cooperation through fitness interdependence" (PDF). Nature Human Behaviour. 2 (7): 429–431. doi:10.1038/s41562-018-0378-4. hdl:1871.1/72e0524e-788d-4f93-90f8-a6f04369a2a7. PMID 31097813. S2CID 49667807.
- Aktipis, A. (2016). "From human sharing to multicellularity and cancer". Evolutionary Applications. 9 (1): 17–36. doi:10.1111/eva.12303. PMC 4780378. PMID 27087837.
- Wasielewski, H., Alcock, J., & Aktipis, A. (2016). "Resource conflict and cooperation between human host and gut microbiota: implications for nutrition and health". Annals of the New York Academy of Sciences. 1372 (1): 20–28. Bibcode:2016NYASA1372...20W. doi:10.1111/nyas.13118. PMID 27270755.
- Aktipis, A., De Aguiar, R., Flaherty, A., Iyer, P., Sonkoi, D., & Cronk, L. (2016). "Cooperation in an uncertain world: for the Maasai of East Africa, need-based transfers outperform account-keeping in volatile environments". Human Ecology. 44 (3): 353–364. Bibcode:2016HumEc..44..353A. doi:10.1007/s10745-016-9823-z. PMC 4937096. PMID 27445430.
- Aktipis, C. A., Boddy, A. M., Jansen, G., Hibner, U., Hochberg, M. E., Maley, C. C., & Wilkinson, G. S. (2015). "Cancer across the tree of life: cooperation and cheating in multicellularity". Philosophical Transactions of the Royal Society B. 370 (1673) 20140219. doi:10.1098/rstb.2014.0219. PMC 4581024. PMID 26056363.
- Boddy, A. M., Fortunato, A., Wilson Sayres, M., & Aktipis, A. (2015). "Fetal microchimerism and maternal health: A review and evolutionary analysis of cooperation and conflict beyond the womb". BioEssays. 37 (10): 1106–1118. doi:10.1002/bies.201500059. PMC 4712643. PMID 26316378.
- Aktipis, C. A. (2011). "Is cooperation viable in mobile organisms? Simple Walk Away rule favors the evolution of cooperation in groups". Evolution and Human Behavior. 32 (4): 263–276. Bibcode:2011EHumB..32..263A. doi:10.1016/j.evolhumbehav.2011.01.002. PMC 3110732. PMID 21666771.
- Aktipis, C. A. (2004). "Know when to walk away: contingent movement and the evolution of cooperation". Journal of Theoretical Biology. 231 (2): 249–260. Bibcode:2004JThBi.231..249A. doi:10.1016/j.jtbi.2004.06.020. PMID 15380389.

== Selected talks ==
- "Why Do We Get Cancer?", Institute for Advanced Study, Berlin Institute for Advanced Study, 2014
- "The Science of Sharing", The Exploratorium Museum, San Francisco, 2015
- "Do You Believe in Generosity", TEDxASU, 2016
- "Why Cancer Is Everywhere", Harvard Museums of Science and Culture, 2018
- "The Evolutionary Biology of Zombification", Center for Evolution and Medicine, Arizona State University, 2019
