= Altena (disambiguation) =

Altena may refer to:

- Altena, town in North Rhine-Westphalia, Germany
  - VfB Altena, football club from that town
  - Altena Castle, early 12th century castle predating the town
  - Berg-Altena, a county originating in the early 12th century and later known as the County of Mark
- Land van Altena, a historical region (c. 900 to 1589) and former fiefdom of the Lords of Altena in the Netherlands
- Altena, Drenthe, a village in the municipality of Noordenveld in the Netherlands
- Altena, North Brabant, a municipality in the Netherlands
- Fort Altena, New Netherland, a Dutch colony near Fort Christina, Delaware
- Altena (Noir), the chief antagonist in the anime series Noir
- Altena (automobile), an early Dutch automobile
- Altena (surname), Dutch surname (including Van Altena)

== See also ==
- Atena (disambiguation)
- Athena (disambiguation)
