= Athena Sefat =

American physicist

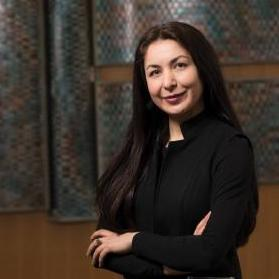
- Athena Sefat
- Born: 1977 (age 48–49); Iran
- Education: McMaster University (BS, PhD)
- Scientific career
- Workplaces: Oak Ridge National Laboratory; U.S. Department of Energy (DOE)
- Thesis: Magnetic and electronic transitions in neodymium(1-x) titanium oxide: A study of correlation effects (2005)

Athena Safa Sefat, born 1977 in Iran is a Canadian/American physicist, with research focus on quantum materials and correlated phenomena. She was a senior scientist at Oak Ridge National Laboratory and led the DOE Basic Energy Science on "Probing Competing Chemical, Electronic, and Spin Correlations for Quantum Materials Functionality". She is currently a Program Manager at U.S. Department of Energy (DOE), Office of Science, Basic Energy Sciences, with Division of Materials Sciences and Engineering.

== Early life and education ==
Sefat was born in Iran and came to Canada in her teens. She studied chemistry for her bachelor's degree at McMaster University (Canada). Sefat remained at McMaster for her PhD, completing a thesis entitled Magnetic and electronic transitions in neodymium(1-x) titanium oxide: A study of correlation effects in 2005 where she was supervised by John E. Greedan.

== Career and research ==
Sefat was awarded a postdoctoral fellowship at Ames Laboratory working under Paul C. Canfield. She joined ORNL in 2007 and was awarded the prestigious DOE Office of Science Early Career Award for the period 2010–2015. She is a fellow of the American Physical Society and the Institute of Physics. She serves as a member of the American Physical Society Committee on International Freedom of Scientists, and the Materials Research Society New Meetings Subcommittee.

Sefat has participated in science communication and outreach events like Science Saturdays at ORNL.

== Awards and honours ==
- Fellow of the American Physical Society
- Fellow of the Institute of Physics
- Eugene Wigner Fellowship Award
- U.S. Department of Energy Office of Science Early Career Research Award
- Named among Thomas Reuters’ top influential researchers for 2014
- 2011 Gordon Battelle Award for Group Scientific Discovery
