= Sprint Applied Research & Advanced Technology Labs =

Research facility

- Industry: Telecommunications
- Headquarters: Burlingame, California
- Area served: United States and worldwide
- Services: Mobile phone research
- Website: Sprint ATL Website

Sprint Nextel Corporation
- Company type: Public (NYSE: S)
- Industry: Telecommunications
- Founded: 1937
- Founder: Cleyson Brown (Sprint); Morgan O'Brien (Nextel)
- Headquarters: Overland Park, Kansas
- Area served: United States and worldwide
- Key people: James Hance, chairman Dan Hesse, chief executive
- Services: Mobile phone services Internet carrier
- Revenue: ▲US$32.26 billion (2009)
- Operating income: ▼US$ 1.39 billion (2009)
- Net income: ▼US$2.43 billion (2009)
- Website: sprint.com

Sprint Applied Research & Advanced Technology Labs (Sprint ATL/Sprint Labs) is Sprint Nextel research facility, located in Burlingame, CA.

== See also ==
- Sprint Nextel
- Nextel Communications
- WiMAX
- Clearwire
- Open Handset Alliance
