= Athena (asteroid spacecraft) =

Proposed Pallas flyby probe

- Mission type: Asteroid flyby
- Operator: NASA
- Mission duration: 2 years (planned)

Spacecraft properties
- Launch mass: ≈ 182 kg (401 lb)

Start of mission
- Launch date: 2022 (proposed)

Flyby of 2 Pallas

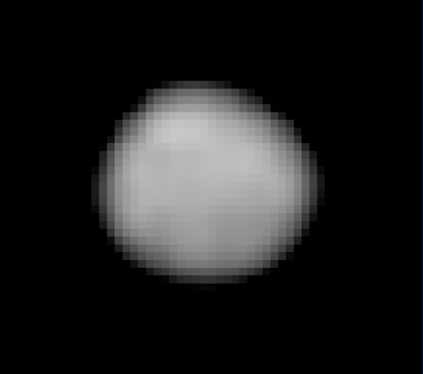
An ultraviolet image of Pallas showing its spherical shape, taken by the Hubble Space Telescope in 2007.

Athena was a proposed space mission that would have performed a single flyby of asteroid 2 Pallas, the third largest asteroid in the Solar System.

If Athena had been funded, it was planned to share the launch vehicle with the Psyche and Janus spacecraft and fly its own trajectory for a Mars gravity assist to slingshot into the asteroid belt. It would have taken about two years to reach Pallas. The mission's principal investigator was Joseph O'Rourke, at Arizona State University.

The Athena spacecraft was examined in Category 1 of the 2018 NASA SIMPLEx competition and was eliminated before reaching Category 2; it will possibly be proposed at a later unknown time. The Athena mission was beaten by other mission concepts such as the TransOrbital TrailBlazer lunar orbiter.

== Objectives ==
The science goals and objectives included:

- to determine how differentiation varies on bodies with large proportions of ices and how they evolved over time.
- to determine how the current population of asteroids evolved in time and space.
- to understand the role of water in the evolution of Pallas.
- to constrain the dynamical evolution of Pallas and asteroids in the Pallas impact family.

Athena would have conducted visible imaging of the geology of Pallas with a miniature color (RGB) camera. Also, a radio science experiment would have used a continuous antenna pointing to Earth for two-way Doppler tracking to enable the determination of the mass of Pallas with a precision of <0.05%.
