= Panayiotis Loizides (businessman) =

Cypriot businessman

Panayiotis Loizides is a Cypriot businessman. He has been the secretary-general of the Cyprus Chamber of Commerce since 1975, and is the chairman of RCB Bank.
