= Livingetc =

British interior design magazine

- Cover of the September 2024 issue
- Editor: Pip Rich (formerly Pip McCormac)
- Former editors: Sarah Spiteri, Suzanne Imre, Neil McLennan, Jane Bruton
- Categories: Interior design
- Frequency: Monthly
- Circulation: 57,000
- First issue: 1998
- Company: Future plc
- Country: United Kingdom
- Based in: London
- Language: English
- Website: www.livingetc.com

Livingetc is a magazine focused on modern interior design and published by Future plc.

== History ==
Livingetc began publication in 1998 in London, England, and focused on minimalist interiors.

== Current ==
Livingetc is a British magazine focused on modern homes, showcasing designers, houses from around the world, interior trends, and decorating ideas. The magazine is edited by Pip Rich, formerly known as Pip McCormac, who has previously worked at ELLE Decoration, Red, Sunday Times Style, and Grazia.

Columnists include Minnie Kemp and Ruth Mottershead, with Jonathan Adler serving as the first guest editor for the June 2021 issue.

== Other ventures ==
In addition to publishing the magazine, Livingetc sells lighting, furniture and fabrics. It previously launched Livingetc Home, a collection of furniture and accessories. The magazine also produced Livingetc TV, a 15-part series for Discovery Travel & Living, and created a series of CDs in collaboration with The Big Chill (music festival), Buddha Bar, Momo’s Kemia Bar and Sketch (restaurant) and bar. In 2009, a Livingetc paint range was developed and sold through the UK DIY superstore B&Q.

== Notable contributors ==
Linda Boronkay and Poppy Okotcha have been two of the magazine's monthly columnists.

Jamie Oliver was a culinary contributor in the early years and had his first two houses photographed for the magazine. Sir Terence Conran had his house photographed for the October 2006 issue. The magazine has also featured the houses of actors like Courteney Cox and Rachel Griffiths, radio presenter Jamie Theakston, and designer Sebastian Conran.

== Livingetc website ==
Livingetc’s website, was launched in 2005 as an extension of the magazine.
