= SS Athenia =

Several ships have shared the name SS Athenia, including:

- SS Athenia (1903), launched in 1903 and sunk in 1917
- SS Athenia (1922), launched in 1922 and sunk in 1939

== See also ==
- Athenea (given name)
- Athenia (Holly Springs, Mississippi)
