= The Athenian (magazine) =

- Publisher: Founder/Publisher - Helen Panopalis Kotsonis (1974-1978) Publisher - Sloane Elliott (1979 - 1993)
- First issue: April 12, 1974
- Final issue: April 1, 1993
- Country: Greece
- Based in: Athens
- Website: https://www.the-athenian.com/site/
- ISSN: 1011-8993

The Athenian was an English-language magazine printed in Greece, featuring journalism, commentary, satire, cartoons and essays. Although its reviews and events listings focused on the cultural life of Athens, The Athenian had a wide audience of English reading residents of Greece and travelers. It was also known for its illustrated covers, its commentaries on popular and ancient Hellenic culture as well as travel information.

== History ==
The Athenian was founded by Helen Panopalis Kotsonis in 1974, during the final months of the Greek military dictatorship. She was the magazine's owner, publisher, and editor until 1979. Kotsonis was a Canadian of Greek and Scottish parentage, educated at McGill and Columbia Universities. Kotsonis's model was the New Yorker magazine, with an emphasis on Greek cultural events and history; reviews of theater, cinema, art, and archeology; practical information on museums, shopping, and showtimes; and satire. Its targeted readership was English-speaking Greeks, expats, and tourists. Kotsonis wrote in the first issue, "In this journal, we would like to reflect the various cultures that converge here -- and in the process make life in Athens more interesting and understandable." Its covers were emblematic of the era, and a few of them touched on political issues, such as the fall of the military dictatorship in July 1974.

In 1979, the title was bought by Sloane Elliott, who had acted as editorial director, then advisory editor, and finally contributing editor. Elliott was a Yale-educated novelist, playwright, essayist and continued the magazines publication through The Athenian Press Ltd. company, until August 1993.

== Contributors ==
Contributors included scholars, writers, illustrators and painters who worked on the magazine throughout its publication. Some notable contributors were Kimon Friar, Paul Valassakis, Grover Williamson McDiarmid, Robert Brenton Betts, Loui Silivridou-Pasalari, Paul Anastasi, Kevin Andrews, Elizabeth Boleman-Herring, Willard Manus, Katerina Agrafioti, Marc Dubin, Alec Kitroeff, Yannis Gaitis, Alekos Fassianos, Antonis Kalamaras, Spyros Vassiliou, Spyros Ornerakis, Nikos Stavroulakis and more.

== Editorial and articles ==
The magazine’s main editorial titled “Our Town” became essential reading for English speaking readers, analyzing the political and social developments of Greece. The magazine offered a community calendar with all of the city's cultural events

== On-line Archive ==
In 2022 the complete archive of the magazine was digitized and uploaded on-line, developed via an exclusive donation by the Stavros Niarchos Foundation.
