= Altena (automobile) =

The Altena was a Dutch motorcycle and automobile made by NV Haarlemsche Automobiel & Motorrijwielfabriek, based in Haarlem-Heemstede from 1900 to 1906.

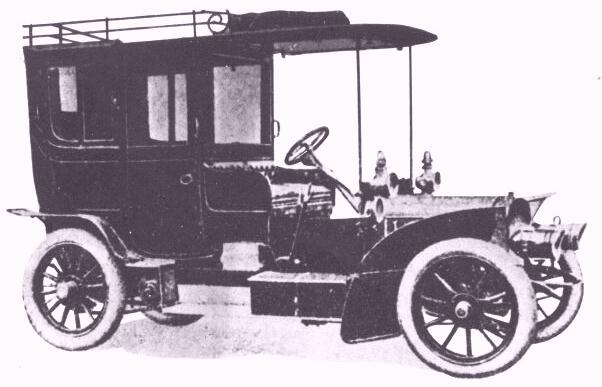
Altena car from 1905

The first car built was powered by a 3.5 hp De Dion single-cylinder powerplant. From 1905 models having 8, 10, and 12 hp engines were offered.

The company was declared bankrupt in 1906 but a few cars were advertised into 1907.

It is estimated that some 40 or 50 cars were made.

== Literature ==
- Harald H. Linz, Halwart Schrader: The big automobile Encyclopedia , BLV, München 1986, ISBN 3-405-12974-5.
- G. N. Georgano: cars. Encyclopédie complète. 1885 à nos jours. Courtille, 1975 (French)
- G. Marshall Naul, "Altena", in G.N. Georgano, ed., The Complete Encyclopedia of Motorcars 1885-1968 (New York: E.P. Dutton and Co., 1974), pp. 38.

== Links ==
- GTÜ Society for Technical Supervision mbH (accessed on 22 December 2013)
