= FV Athena =

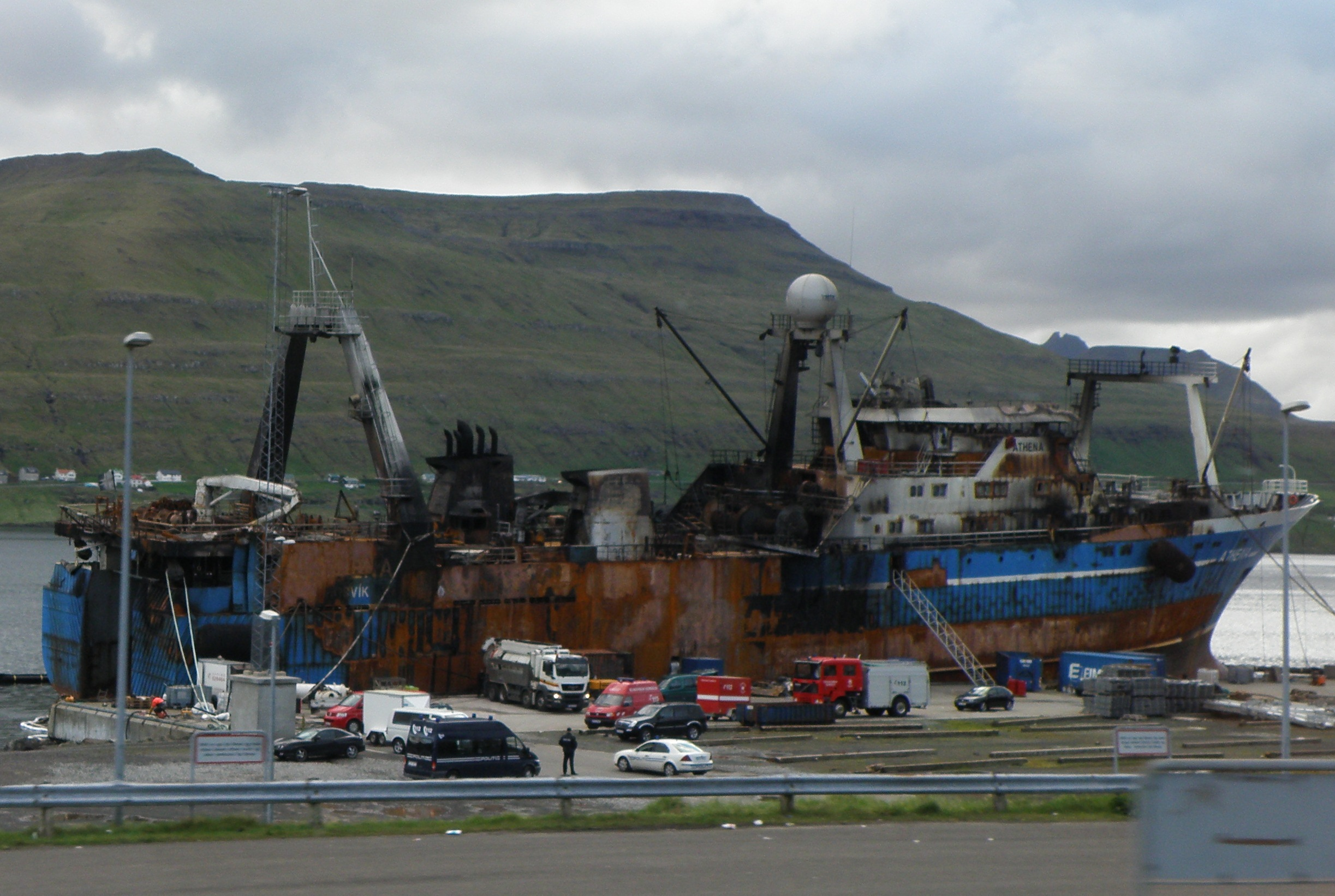
- Athena five days after the fire on 9 May 2011 in the Faroe Islands.

History
- Name: Kapitan Azarkin (1992-2004); Athena (2004-05); Skadi (2005); Athena (2005-08); Athena II (2008-09); Athena (since 2009)
- Owner: Dalmoreport Trawlers Ltd (1992-2001); Laskarddis Shipping Ltd (2001); Bergen Industries & Fishing Corp (2001-04); Davlos Shipping Ltd (2004-05); Atlantic Wave Co Ltd (2005); Ocean Group Faroes Ltd (2005-10); Thor Offshore and Fisheries (since 2010)
- Operator: Unimed Glory SA (1992-2006); Ocean Group Faroes Ltd (2006-10); Thor Offshore and Fisheries (since 2010)
- Port of registry: (Russia) Vladivostok (1992-2004); (Greece) Athens (2001); South Korea (2001-04); (Faroe Islands) Hósvík (since 2005)
- Builder: Factorias Vulcano SA
- Yard number: 503
- Laid down: 9 October 1991
- Launched: 2 February 1992
- Completed: 1 November 1992
- Out of service: May 2011
- Identification: IMO number: 8907096; MMSI number: 231411000; Callsign: OW2133
- Fate: Sold for scrap

General characteristics
- Class & type: Factory ship
- Tonnage: 7,805 GT; 3,920 NT; 5,460 DWT
- Length: 105.00 m (344 ft 6 in) overall; 88.80 m (291 ft 4 in) between perpendiculars
- Beam: 20.03 m (65 ft 9 in)
- Draught: 7.00 m (23 ft 0 in) (minimum); 9.15 m (30 ft 0 in) (maximum)
- Depth: 14.70 m (48 ft 3 in)
- Decks: 3
- Ice class: ICE-C
- Installed power: Wärtsilä 16V32D diesel engine
- Speed: 14.5 knots (26.9 km/h; 16.7 mph)
- Crew: 125

Athena was a 7,805 GT factory ship which was built in 1992. In October 2010, she caught fire off the Isles of Scilly. In May 2011 she caught fire while lying at the harbour of Runavík in Skálafjørður, Faroe Islands. It happened at night, and people who lived on the other side of the fjord, where the smoke was headed, were evacuated. Some months later the ship was sold to Smedegaarden in Esbjerg, which took her apart.

== Construction ==
The ship was a 7,805 GT factory ship. She was 105.00 metres (344 ft 6 in) long overall (88.80 metres (291 ft 4 in) between perpendiculars), with a beam of 20.03 metres (65 ft 9 in). She has a maximum draught of 9.15 metres (30 ft 0 in) and a depth of 14.70 metres (48 ft 3 in).

The ship was propelled by a 5,920 kilowatts (7,940 hp) Wärtsilä 16V32D diesel engine which drives a single 4.00-metre (13 ft 1 in) diameter 4-blade screw propeller, giving her a maximum speed of 14.5 knots (26.9 km/h; 16.7 mph). She was equipped with two 1,030 kilowatts (1,380 hp) Deutz auxiliary diesel engines. Athena was also equipped with a 440 kilowatts (590 hp) bow thruster.

== History ==
The contract for building the ship was signed on 24 February 1989. Built by Factorias Vulcano SA, Vigo as yard number 503, her keel was laid on 9 October 1991 and she was launched on 20 February 1992. Completion was on 1 November 1992.

Originally named Kapitan Azarkin, she was built for Rybcomflot Moscow, Russia. She was allocated the IMO number 8907096. In 2001, she was awarded by a court judgement to Laskaridis Shipping Co Ltd, Athens, Greece, and was renamed Athena. Renamed Athena in 2004, she was sold in 2005 to Davlos Shipping Ltd, followed by a sale later that year to Atlantic Wave Co Ltd, the nationalities of which are not recorded.

She was renamed Skadi at this time. She was then sold to Ocean Group Faroes Ltd, Hósvík, regaining the name Athena. In 2008, she was renamed Athena II, returning to Athena in 2009. Her port of registry was Hósvík and Athena was allocated the MMSI number 231411000.

On 27 October 2010, Athena was reported to be on fire in the Atlantic Ocean 200 nautical miles (370 km) south west of the Isles of Scilly. The Maritime and Coastguard Agency at Falmouth were alerted to the ship's distress at 06:00 British Summer Time (05:00 UTC). The container ship Vega went to her assistance. A Dassault Falcon 50 from France was despatched to co-ordinate communications between the ships and coastguard. A Sea King helicopter of 771 Naval Air Squadron, based at RNAS Culdrose, was scrambled to the Isles of Scilly, where it was refuelled and held ready for use should it be required. The aircraft would have been able to spend only 20 minutes on scene at a time, as Athena was at the limit of its range. Ninety-eight of the 111 crew left Athena in lifeboats, leaving 13 to fight the fire. With the fire reported to be "under control", Athena made for Falmouth at 8 knots (15 km/h) and was expected to arrive on the evening of 28 October. Once she arrived, specialist firefighters were transported to the ship to assess the fire, which was thought to be still burning at the time. Vega, with the 98 crew rescued from Athena, was originally bound for Jamaica. She later diverted to Falmouth to disembark the rescuees.

On 28 October, twelve firemen from Cornwall Fire and Rescue Service were airlifted to Athena by helicopter. At 17:00, the officer in charge of the firefighting operation ordered the ship evacuated because of a release of carbon dioxide. Athena was taken in tow by the tug Anglian Princess at 19:00, but was ordered to remain 4.3 nautical miles (8.0 km) off Falmouth. On 30 October, salvors boarded Athena to assess the damage done to her by the fire. On 2 November, Athena was still being held off Famouth. Salvors from Smit International were reported as fighting the fire, which was still burning, and assessing whether or not it was safe to bring Athena into port. The tug Anglian Earl was giving assistance.

On 9 May 2011, Athena was lying at the harbour of Saltangará in Runavík municipality in the Faroe Islands. Shortly after midnight, a fire on board Athena was reported to the Faroese authorities. There was a lot of smoke and the wind direction was towards the villages on the other side of the Skálafjørður fjord. The people who lived in the villages of Skála and Glyvrar were evacuated at around four in the morning to a community house in Strendur, a neighbouring village. Four men were working on board when the accident happened. The police later reported that the fire was probably caused by the materials which the men were using during their work. Some months later the ship was sold to Esbjerg in Denmark, where she will be broken up.
