= Athena Loizides =

Greek Cypriot television presenter (born 1965)

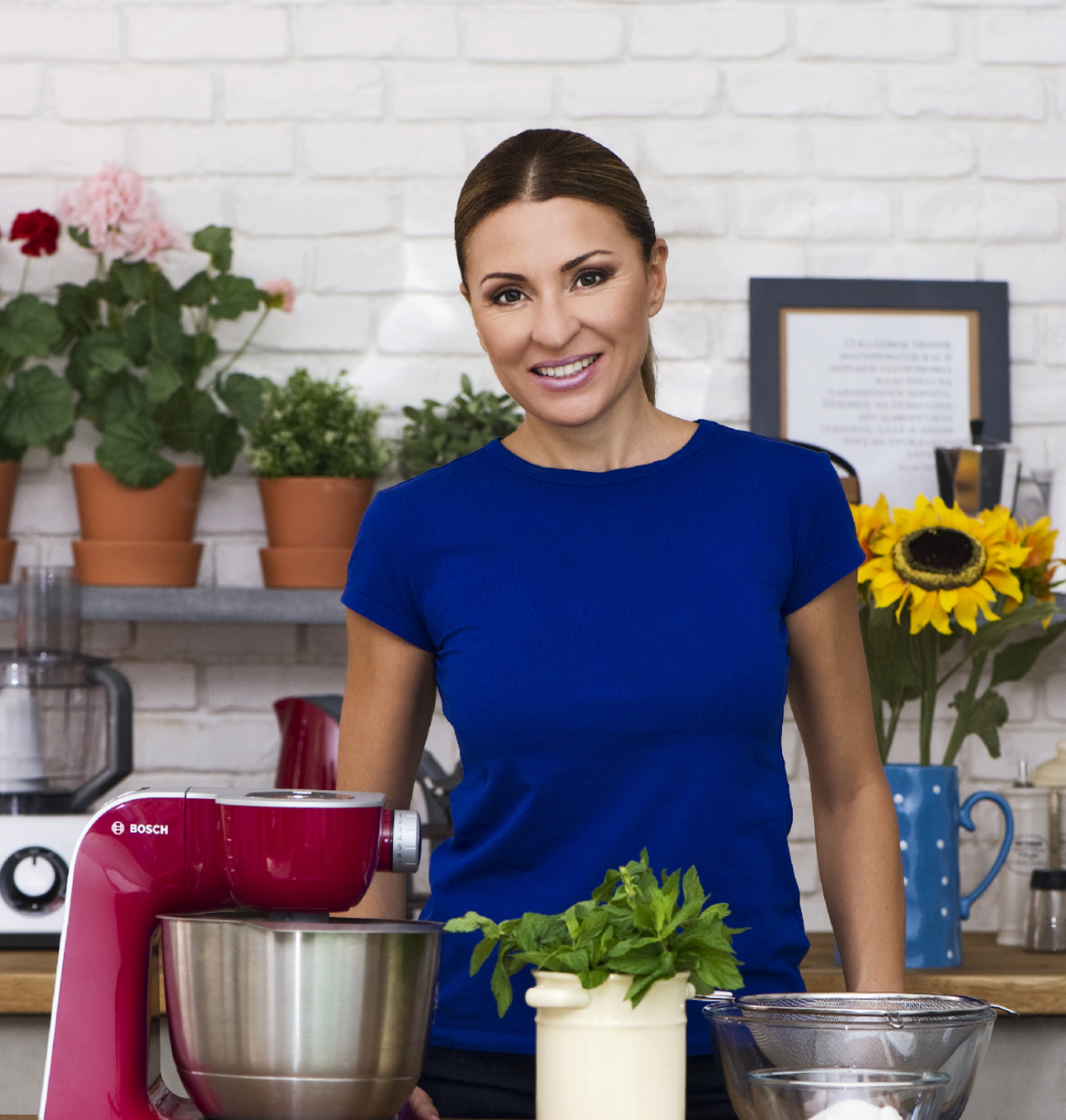
Athena Loizides

Athena Loizides (Greek Αθηνά Λοιζίδου, born 26 March 1965) is a Greek Cypriot television presenter, cookbook author and food writer, specialising in Cypriot and Greek cuisine.

== Career ==
She wrote her first cook book Recipes from all Over in 2007. She then started writing the food pages for the magazine Livingetc, Cyprus edition. In 2009 she published her second cookbook, Stis Athena's in Greek. Her other works include:

- 2010 Cyprus Cuisine in English
- 2011 To Oikogeniako Trapezi in Greek
- 2013 Ta Mystika tis Koyzinas moy in Greek
- 2015 Efkola & Kypriaka in Greek
- 2017 ITS ALL GREEK TO ME in English, a book on Greek and Cypriot cuisine.

She has her own monthly magazine EFKOLA & SPITIKA distributed by the Kathimerini newspaper in Cyprus.
