= Athens Township =

Athens Township may refer to:

== Places ==
Canada

- Athens Township, Ontario

United States

- Athens Township, Ringgold County, Iowa
- Athens Township, Jewell County, Kansas
- Athens Township, Michigan
- Athens Township, Minnesota
- Athens Township, Athens County, Ohio
- Athens Township, Harrison County, Ohio
- Athens Township, Bradford County, Pennsylvania
- Athens Township, Crawford County, Pennsylvania
