= Fouad Tobagi =

Networking engineer

- Education: UCLA
- Scientific career
- Fields: packet radio, satellite networks, local area networks, fast packet switching, multimedia networking, networked video services, multimedia applications

Fouad Tobagi is a professor in the Stanford Department of Electrical Engineering.

== Education ==
Tobagi received the Engineering Diploma from Ecole Centrale des Arts et Manufactures, Paris, France, in 1970. He completed MS (1971) and PhD (1974) in Computer science at the University of California, Los Angeles (UCLA).

== Academic career ==
Tobagi joined the Stanford Department of Electrical Engineering faculty in 1977. At that time, he was also part of the Computer Systems Lab (CSL).

Tobagi was the director of the Stanford Computer Forum (SCF) from 2001 to 2004

In 2019, Tobagi is the associate chair of graduate education in electrical engineering, where he is responsible for curriculum, student progress, teaching assistants and their training.

== Research ==
Tobagi's interests include voice and video communication over the internet, wireless and mobile networks, network design and provisioning, and network resource management. Past research interests include:

- packet radio
- satellite networks
- local area networks
- fast packet switching
- multimedia networking
- networked video services
- multimedia applications

== Select awards and honors ==
- 2016, Inaugural Test of Time Award from SIGMOBILE
- 1985, Fellow of the Institute of Electrical and Electronics Engineers (IEEE) for contributions to the field of computer communications and local area networks.
