= Athens, Nevada =

Athens
- Ghost town
- Location in Nevada
- Coordinates: 38°36′54″N 117°50′0″W
- Country: United States
- State: Nevada
- Counties: Nye
- Founded: 1910
- Deserted: 1939
- Elevation: 6,160 ft (1,880 m)

Population
  - Total: 0
- GNIS feature ID: 848269, 852989

Athens is a former mining settlement in Nye County, Nevada. It was established after a boom in 1910, but was deserted that same year. After the Warrior mine was founded, Athens revived and was inhabited until 1939, when the mining operations were ceased.

== History ==
=== 1910 boom ===
Athens was founded as a mining camp in 1910 after the previous year ore was found in the area by John Martinez, J.R. Stott, and James Herald. In July 1910, a rush to Athens started. In that month, the mining camp had around 75 inhabitants and the camp suffered from a water shortage. On July 9, the Athens Mining District was organized at a meeting with over fifty attendees. Thereafter, thirty tents were set up. Land lots were sold in Athens for $50 and $75 by Lester Bell and businesses like a lodging house, a saloon, and a store arose. The mining camp Juniper Springs was established near Athens, but both settlements merged and the new place was given the name Athens. Back then, the mining settlement had fifteen framed buildings and was connected to Mina by a stagecoach, that went back and forth thrice a week.

A new ore deposit, of which the ore was worth $1,000 a ton, was found by Stott and Martinez. Six of their claims were optioned for $100,000 by John McGee, but the quality of the ore in the deposit turned out to be disappointing. This led to people leaving Athens in the end of 1910. In December, the mining camp was totally deserted.

=== Resurrection ===
Athens was resurrected after the Warrior mine was discovered, which was the most important gold mine in the district. The Warrior mine was sold to the Warrior Gold Mining Company. Because of the finding, permanent structures were built in the mining settlement. In 1913, a amalgamation mill was constructed by Harry McNamara, the owner of another productive mine in the district. The mines of Athens produced $20,000 of gold in their first few months. The Warrior mine was sold to the Aladdin Divide Mining Company, that thoroughly prospected the area, in 1921. This resulted in the discovery of some ore deposits. In July of the same year, the mine was sold to the Olympic Mines Company. That company sent the ore to its mill in Omco in Mineral County.

In 1922, a new company started mining. That company, the Lucky Boy Divide Mining Company, bought an area neighboring Athens. A few years later, the mines stopped producing ore, because the ore had become too rare. However, all the property of the Warrior Company was sold to J.J. McNeil, who reopened the mine in December 1931. The next year, the mine was bought by Warrior Consolidated Gold. The company was not successful and therefore the mine was auctioned by the sheriff in November 1933. L.B. Spencer and L.J. Smith bought it. The ore was brought to the Dayton Consolidated mill in Silver City, Nevada. Leasers were producing ore in Athens until 1939. The Warrior mine, the foundation of an amalgamation mill just east of the Warrior mine, a few other structures, and debris remain at the site.
