= Calliostoma altena =

Scientific classification
- Kingdom: Animalia
- Phylum: Mollusca
- Class: Gastropoda
- Subclass: Vetigastropoda
- Order: Trochida
- Family: Calliostomatidae
- Genus: Calliostoma
- Species: C. altena

Binomial name
- Calliostoma altena Knudsen, 1970

Synonyms
- Calliostoma (Calliostoma) altena Knudsen, 1970

Species of gastropod

Calliostoma altena is a species of sea snail, a marine gastropod mollusk in the family Calliostomatidae.

== Distribution ==
This marine species occurs in the Makassar Strait, Indonesia, at depths more than 900 m.
