= Athena Papas =

American dentist

Athena Papas is an American dental science scholar, who as of 2017 was the Johansen Distinguished Professor of Dental Research at Tufts University. She is a co-author of several books on dentistry as well as numerous articles.

In 2001 she was a recipient of the Pierre Fauchard Award for Distinguished Service. In 2009 she received a Distinguished Scientist Award from the International Association for Dental Research - Pharmacology, Toxicology, and Therapeutics Group. She is a life fellow of the American College of Dentists.

She graduated from Tufts University (BA), Harvard School of Dental Medicine (DMD), and Massachusetts Institute of Technology (PhD).
