= Athena Reich =

Canadian-American actor, writer and Lady impersonator

Athena Reich is a Canadian-American actor, writer, singer/songwriter, and Lady impersonator. Athena's journey to conceive using in vitro fertilisation (IVF) is documented in the Emmy nominated film Vegas Baby.

== Career ==
Athena Reich is known for her Lady tribute. Chatelaine magazine called her, "The world's top Lady... impersonator".

Reich created the Off-Broadway show Lady: #ARTBIRTH, which received Time Out Critics' Pick and ran for two years in New York City at the Laurie Beechman Theatre. Lady #ARTBIRTH then premiered in Toronto at the Berkeley Street Theatre. Reich told the Toronto Star, "#ARTBIRTH first ran in New York, but the Toronto version is completely different. Unlike the old show, which was a cabaret, this is a full-blown musical". Lady: #Artbirth, stars Reich as a pregnant Lady who has decided to give birth in front of her fans as the ultimate performance art piece.

Often mistaken for the real Lady, in 2015, Billboard Magazine printed an image of Athena thinking it was Lady herself. Reich's tribute performances have been endorsed by Lady, who, tweeted in support of Lady: #ARTBIRTH. Reich's Lady tribute has garnered media attention worldwide. She has appeared on CBC, Cp24 and was featured in The New York Times, and was called a "Best Bet" by New York Magazine.

=== Actor ===
Her recent acting credits include The Woman Who Can't Lie directed by Don McKellar and starring Sandra Oh. She played Irene Seale in The Perfect Murder (2015) and appeared in White Collar (2012).

=== Singer ===
As a singer/songwriter, Reich is best known for her hit, "Love is Love" which charted number one on Logo TV and won Best Pop Song at the Outmusic Awards. Reich has released five albums and four singles.
