= MINERVA =

European Union organization

The MInisterial NEtwoRk for Valorising Activities in digitisation, or MINERVA, is a European Union organisation concerned with the digitisation of cultural and scientific content for creating an agreed European common platform, recommendations and guidelines about digitisation, metadata, long-term accessibility and preservation.

== See also ==
- Europeana
