= Athenae (Pontus) =

Coordinates: 41°10′52″N 40°53′20″E

Athenae or Athenai (Ancient Greek: Ἀθῆναι) was a city and port of ancient Pontus, with a Greek temple of Athena. According to Arrian, it was 180 stadia east of the river Adienus, and 280 stadia west of Apsarus.

According to Arrian, the place got its name from the sanctuary of Athena. Procopius, on the other hand, writes that some believe the town was named because colonists from Athens settled there. However, he states that the it actually took its name from a woman called Athenaea (Ancient Greek: Ἀθηναία), who ruled the land in early times. He also adds that her tomb was still there during his time.

Arrian speaks of the place as a deserted fort, but Procopius describes it as a populous place in his time. Konrad Mannert assumes it to be the same place as the Odeinius of the Periplus of Pseudo-Scylax.

Its site is located near the modern town of Pazar, in Turkey.
