= Athena Andreadis =

- Website: athenaandreadis.com

Athena Andreadis is a musician.

== Career ==
She was a featured vocalist on Leonard Cohen's final record You Want It Darker. She contributed backing vocals for the song "Traveling Light."

== Discography ==
=== Breathe With Me ===
Breathe With Me is Athena's debut album, released in 2007 on Embraceable Records and produced by George Andreou and Joe Boyd. The BBC's Morag Reavley calls it "Intimate, thoughtful, original."

=== Ready for the Sun ===
Athena recorded her first U.S. album, Ready For The Sun, at The Village Studios in Los Angeles with producer Ethan Allen. Musicians on the record included Deron R. Johnson, Jimmy Paxson, Michael Ward and Jonathan Flaugher. Kevin Reagan was the artistic director. The record was released in February 2017, with Music Junkie Press calling it "a debut album that should take the US market by storm - there is simply no one like Athena and this album signals the entry of a new star in the American music firmament," and The Huffington Post calling her voice "both heartwarming and majestic."

One of the songs from the record, "Stronger" has been placed at the end credits of the US movie Swing Away.

== Fuller House ==
Athena's song "You Bring Me Luck", is sung by Stephanie (Jodie Sweetin) during the Fuller House season 3 finale.

== Other sources ==
- ΑΘΗΝΑ ΑΝΔΡΕΑΔΗ Ολα ξεκίνησαν από τη διοίκηση επιχειρήσεων [ATHENS ANDREADI All started from business administration] (in Greek). 19 September 2010. (Google Translate)
