= MS Athina B =

Merchant ship

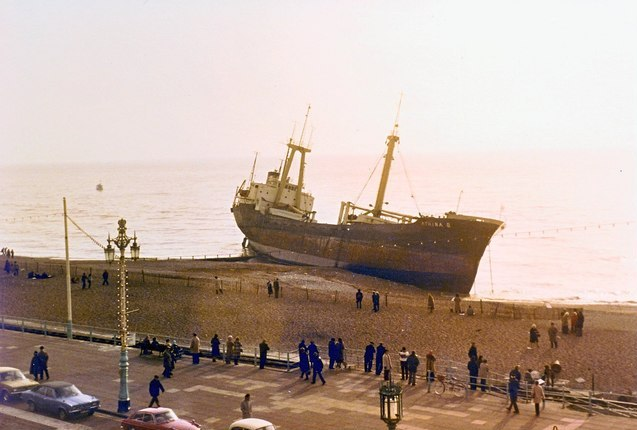
- The Athina B beached in Brighton in 1980

History

Japan
- Name: MS Kojima Maru
- Builder: Ujina, Hiroshima
- Yard number: 479
- Launched: 1968
- Completed: March 1968
- Renamed: MS Hung Wei (1973); MS Nina Pa (1976); MS Athina B (1979 – reflagged)
- Identification: IMO number: 6818148

Greece
- Name: MS Athina B
- Out of service: 21 January 1980
- Home port: Piraeus
- Identification: IMO number: 6818148
- Fate: Scrapped February 1980

General characteristics
- Tonnage: 3,468 tons
- Length: 89.7 m (294 ft 3 in)
- Beam: 12.8 m (42 ft 0 in)
- Speed: 12 knots

The Athina B was a Greek merchant ship. On 21 January 1980, while sailing from Portugal, she suffered engine failure in bad weather and beached at the seaside resort of Brighton, England, to the east of the Palace Pier.

The ship became a temporary tourist attraction, with the Volk's Electric Railway opening out of season to serve the large number of sightseers. The anchor is on display on Brighton seafront. A restaurant in Brighton bears the name of the ship and a painting of Athena B by Dennis Roxby Bott is in Brighton Museum.

== Career ==
Built as the Kojima Maru at Hiroshima in 1968, the Athina B initially sailed under the Japanese flag. She was renamed Hung Wei in 1973 and Nina Pa in 1976, before being sold and renamed the Athina B in 1979, sailing under the Greek flag.

== Final voyage ==
The Athina B left the Azores on 11 December 1979 laden with 3,000 tonnes of pumice. Her destination was the port at Shoreham-by-Sea, West Sussex. During the voyage, she had problems with her generator, gyro compass and radar, and put in at La Rochelle in France for repairs. On arrival at Shoreham on 20 January, force seven or eight winds meant she was unable to enter harbour. Her engines failed, and a Mayday call was issued. The Shoreham lifeboat Dorothy and Philip Constance took off half the crew and the captain's family, with the rest being rescued on the morning of 21 January. Four missions were needed to rescue all those on board. The ship drifted eastwards and eventually ran aground to the east of the Palace Pier. The ship broke her back and was declared a write-off.

== Awards ==
Coxwain Ken Voice was awarded a RNLI Silver Medal; Crew members Ken Everard, Michael Fox, Peter Huxtable, John Landale, Jack Silverson and Geoff Tugwell were awarded the RNLI's Thanks of the Institution on Vellum; Crew members Peter Everard and Derek Silverson received letters of thanks signed by the director of the RNLI for their part in the rescue of the crew of the Athina B.

== Salvage ==
The ship remained on the beach for a month, guarded by the police to prevent looting. After a mobile crane was used to remove the cargo, she was refloated and towed to a scrapyard at Rainham, Kent on 21 February 1980, where she was scrapped.

== See also ==
- MS Riverdance – ferry that ran aground at Blackpool on 31 January 2008.
