= Athenae (Boeotia) =

Town in ancient Boeotia, Greece

Athenae or Athenai (Ancient Greek: Ἀθῆναι) was a town of ancient Boeotia, on the river Triton, and near Lake Copais. Athenae, along with the neighbouring town of Eleusis, was destroyed by an inundation.
