= Athenae Diades =

Town of ancient Euboea, Greece

Coordinates: 38°50′46″N 22°58′34″E

Athenae Diades or Athenai Diades (Ancient Greek: Ἀθῆναι Διάδες) was a town of ancient Euboea, near the promontory Cenaeum, founded by the Athenians, or according to Ephorus, by Dias, a son of Abas. Athenae and Athenai are native names of Athens. In the 5th century BCE, it belonged to the Delian League. At the end of that century it belonged to the territory of the city of Oreus but it recovered its independence at the beginning of 4th century BCE since the town is documented as one of the original members of the Second Athenian League.

Its site is located near the modern village of Gialtra.
