= Athenas =

Catholic singer from Argentina

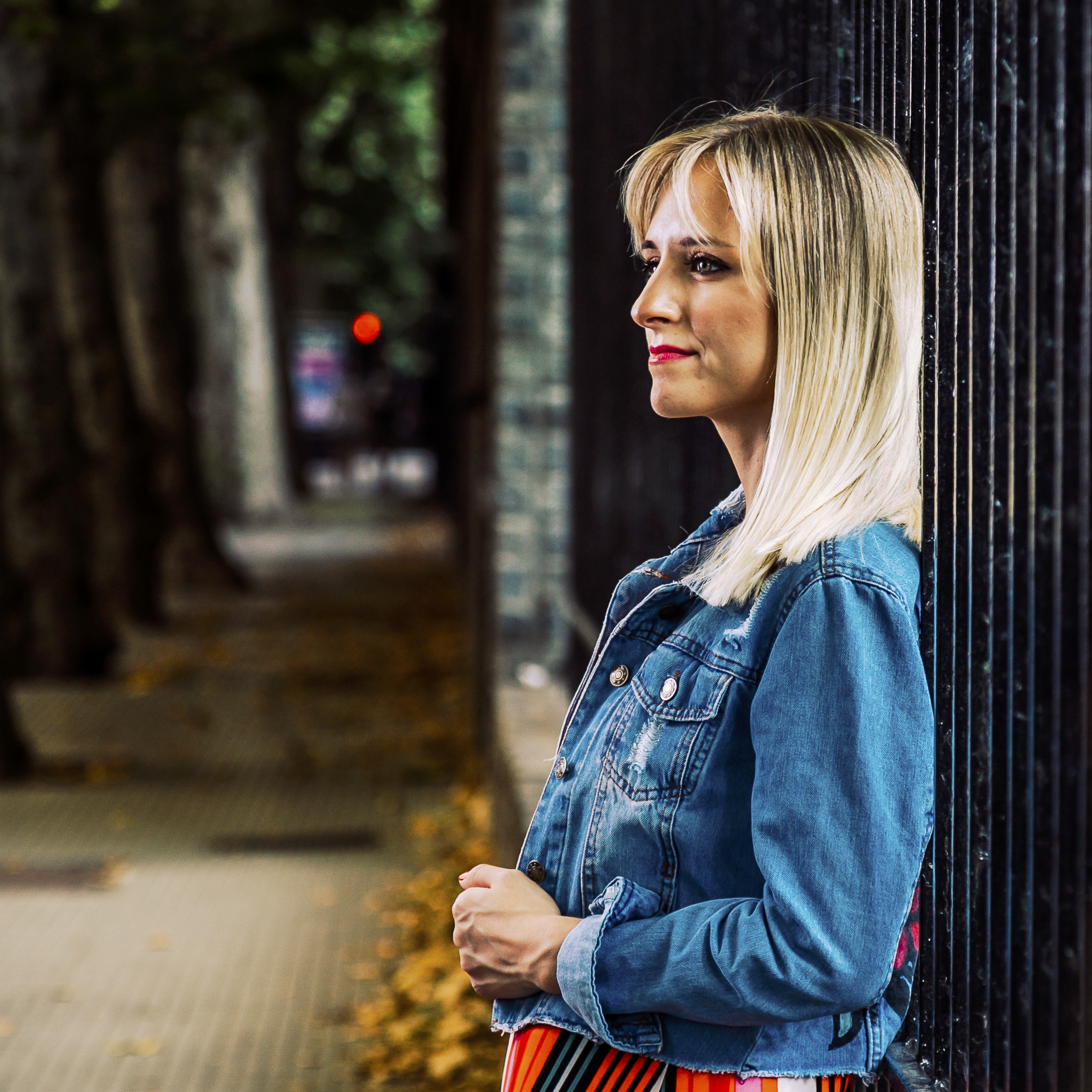

Background information
- Born: Athenas María Vénica; January 10, 1992 (age 34); Buenos Aires, Argentina
- Genre: Latin Catholic music
- Occupations: Singer; songwriter; musician
- Years active: 2012–present
- Website: athenasmusica.com

Athenas María Vénica (born in Buenos Aires, Argentina, on January 10, 1992) is a Catholic Music singer-songwriter from Argentina.

In 2022, she was nominated to the Latin Grammy for her album Alfa y Omega for Best Christian Album. With over seven released albums, her YouTube channel is in the top 10, with more subscribers among female singers from Argentina.

She gained international acclaim after her performance at the 2013 World Youth Day in Brazil, and since then has toured 20 countries and over 150 cities all over the United States, Latin America, and Europe.

== Biography ==
Athenas was born in Buenos Aires, Argentina. During her childhood, folklore music marked the beginning of her love for music. Since then, she began her integral training as an artist in singing, dancing, and acting, among others.

At the age of ten, she applied for the musical reality show Cantaniño hosted by the Argentine TV channel Telefe, and was chosen among thousands of participants along with other four kids. The winners formed the child musical group KtrasK, with whom she toured all over Argentina and Uruguay and visited the most prominent Argentinian media outlets. The group was nominated to several music and TV awards, including Premios Gardel awards and Martín Fierro Awards and their albums gained gold and platinum certifications in Argentina.

According to Athenas, once away from the media and secular music, she had her first contact with contemporary Christian music at the age of 15, awakening her desire to sing for God. In 2012, she recorded some music videos with producer Jonatan Narvaez, which went viral on YouTube. Thanks to the popularity generated, Athenas was able to perform at various events in Latin America. One of them was the World Youth Day in Rio de Janeiro, Brazil, with the presence of Pope Francis and an audience of millions of people.

Since then, she has released several studio albums, including Cristo Reina (2014), Me Basta Tu Gracia (2016), Todo Es Tuyo (2018), Todo Es Tuyo (Deluxe) (2020) and Alfa y Omega (2021) nominated to the Latin Grammy in the category for Best Christian Album in Spanish. She has also released several volumes of sung psalms, Catholic prayers set to music, and various collaborations and recordings. In addition, she participated in Juan Delgado's album, Todo Pasa, a Latin Grammy-winning record work in the "Best Christian Album" category, in 2019.

In 2022, she was nominated for a Latin Grammy for her album Alfa y Omega in the Best Christian Album in Spanish category. She has also received various Catholic music awards, including the Pío Awards, such as "Best Female Artist of the Year", "Best Musical Collaboration" and "Best Music Video". She also won the Spera Awards for "Best Latin Artist", and the YouTube Silver Creator Award (YouTube Silver Button), recognition for having reached 100,000 subscribers on her channel, which has now exceeded 1 million as of 2025.

In 2025, she released the album Clásicos Católicos, featuring acoustic versions of popular Catholic songs, which has already surpassed 10 million streams on Spotify and over 50 million views on YouTube.

== Discography ==
=== Studio albums ===
- Cristo Reina (2014)
- Me Basta Tu Gracia (2016)
- Todo Es Tuyo (2018)
- Todo Es Tuyo (Deluxe) (2020) – featuring 15 catholic artists
- Alfa y Omega (2021) – nominated to the Latin Grammy
- Navidad Es Jesús (2022) – Christmas EP
- Clásicos Católicos (2025) – cover album

=== Singles ===
- Diario de María (2018)
- Tú estás conmigo (Salsa) (2019)
- Pieta (Dulce Madre) (2019)
- El Cielo Para Ti (2020)
- Samaritana (2022)
- Una Canción para la Comunión (2023)
- Vive Jesús (2023)
- Junto a Ti María (2023)
- Milagro de Amor (2023)
- Vida en Abundancia – (2023)
- Alma Misionera – (2023)
- Acaso No Estoy Yo Aquí (Mariachi) – (2023)
- María Tu Amor – (2024)

== Personal life ==
Athenas is married to the musician Tobías Buteler since February 25, 2017. On July 2, 2021, she announced through her social media she was pregnant with their first child. On September 4, 2021, their son Elías was born.
