= Bibliography of Christadelphians =

The following is a bibliography of books in the English language relating to the general topic of Christadelphians.

== Bibliography ==
- Alfs, Matthew - Concepts of Father, Son, and Holy Spirit : a classification and description of the Trinitarian and non-Trinitarian theologies existent within Christendom
- Andrew, J. J. - Baptismal-Belief
- Andrew, J. J. - The Blood of the Covenant
- Andrew, J. J. - The Doctrine of Atonement
- Arnstein, Walter L. - Protestant Versus Catholic in Mid-Victorian England
- Bacon, Graham - The Revelation at a Glance
- Bible Companion
- Blore, Charles B. - Dr John Thomas: his family and the background of his times
- Booker, George - Biblical Fellowship
- Booker, George - A New Creation
- Boulton, William Henry - Paul the Apostle
- Brady, Madalaine Margaret - Christadelphians and conscientious objection to military service in Britain in World War One
- Bricknell, John - Do all to the glory of God : a brief account of the formation of the first Christadelphian Ecclesia at Goolwa in South Australia and of the Victor Harbor Christadelphian Ecclesia
- Burrell, Maurice C. & John S. Wright - Some modern faiths : (Jehovah's Witnesses, Christadelphians, Christian Scientists, Theosophicalsystems, Mormons, Spiritualists)
- Clark, Elmer T. - The Small Sects of America
- Collyer, W. Islip - Conviction and Conduct
- Collyer, W. Islip - The Guiding Light
- Collyer, W. Islip - Robert Roberts: A Study in Life and Character
- Cooper, Amy F. - Reframing, regrouping, and empowering : the Christadelphians as a test case for theories about conservative christian women
- Encountering new religious movements: a holistic evangelical approach.
- Evans, E. R. - Test Case for Canada '3314545'
- Evans, E. R. - "Ye are strangers and sojourners with me": a study of the Christadelphian teaching concerning a Christian's relationship to the state
- Fadelle, Norman - John Thomas and His Rediscovery of Bible Truth
- Gibson, Arthur - Evolution versus creation
- Govett, Robert - Christadelphians, not Christians
- Alan Hayward - Creation and Evolution
- Hayward, Alan - Great news for the world
- Hayward, Alan - God's Truth
- Heaster, Duncan - Bible basics
- Hopkins, Branson - Unmasking Christadelphianism : the hopelessness of the hope
- House, H. Wayne - Charts of cults, sects & religious movements
- Hutchins, Leta - Christadelphians
- Jannaway, A. T. - The Ground of Resurrectional Responsibility
- Jannaway, A. T. - The Inspiration Division, 1884-1921
- Jannaway, Frank G. - The Bible and How It Came to Us
- Jannaway, Frank G. - The Bible Divine
- Jannaway, Frank G. - The Bible Student in Many Lands
- Jannaway, Frank G. - Bible Times and Seasons
- Jannaway, Frank G. - British Museum - Bible in Hand
- Jannaway, Frank G. - Brother Roberts on Copyright
- Jannaway, Frank G. - Christ Our Passover
- Jannaway, Frank G. - Christadelphian Answers on all sorts of Difficulties
- Jannaway, Frank G., comp. - Christadelphian Facts Concerning Christendeom ... by Dr. J. Thomas ... and other ...Christadelphians
- Jannaway, Frank G., comp. - Christadelphian Key to the Prophecies
- Jannaway, Frank G., comp. - Christadelphian Treasury
- Jannaway, Frank G., comp. - Christadelphians and Fellowship
- Jannaway, Frank G. - Christadelphians and Military Service
- Jannaway, Frank G. - Christadelphians on the Great War
- Jannaway, Frank G. - Christadelphians Then and Now
- Jannaway, Frank G. - Christians not Christians
- Jannaway, Frank G. - A Godless Socialism
- Jannaway, Frank G. - A Happy World
- Jannaway, Frank G., comp. - How Long?
- Jannaway, Frank G. - Lest We Forget or Have Forgotten
- Jannaway, Frank G. - Our New Bible
- Jannaway, Frank G. - Ought Christians to Be Socialists?
- Jannaway, Frank G. - Palestine and the Jews
- Jannaway, Frank G. - Palestine and the Powers
- Jannaway, Frank G. - Palestine and the World
- Jannaway, Frank G. - The Salvation Army and the Bible
- Jannaway, Frank G. - Solemn Warning Concerning Christadelphian Apostasy
- Jannaway, Frank G. - Tears of Gratitude
- Jannaway, Frank G. - The Triune God of the Church of England
- Jannaway, Frank G. - Which Is the Remedy - Socialism or the Reign of Christ?
- Jannaway, Frank G. - Without the camp : being the story of why and how the Christadelphians were exempted from military service
- Jannaway, Frank G. - The Worst Enemies of the Bible
- Keele, G. T. - Truth and Error
- Lea, John W. - The Life and Writings of Dr. Thomas
- Lippy, Charles H. - The Christadelphians in North America
- Lo Bello, Kristin Anne - The Christadelphians: the true fundamentalists
- MacGregor, Lorri - Christadelphians and Christianity
- McHaffie, Averil and Iam McHaffie - 150 years : a very brief history of Edinburgh Christadelphian Ecclesia (1853-2003)
- McHaffie, Ruth - Brethren indeed?: Christadelphians and "outsiders" (16th-21st century)
- McHaffie, Ruth - Finding founders and facing facts
- McHaffie, Ruth - Timewatching - and Israel. Volume 1. Expectations
- Mitchell, Thomas S. - I am a conscientious objector : explaining the position of those who by reason of their religious training and belief, support the tenets of the Christadelphian faith
- Morgan, James Logan - Christadelphians in Arkansas, 1968.
- Nicholls, Alfred - Remember the days of old: twelve editorial articles from the Christadelphian
- Norris, A. D. - The Apocalypse for Every Man
- Norris, A. D. - The Things We Stand For
- Norris, A. D. - Understanding the Bible
- Norris, E. - The courts of the women
- One Hundred Years of the Christadelphian
- Panton, D. M. - Satanic Counterfeits
- Pollock. A. J. - Christadelphianism Astray from the Bible
- Pollock, A. J. - Christadelphianism: briefly tested by scritpture
- Powell, J. W. - The historical record of the Sydney Central Christadelphian Ecclesia, 1864 to 1990 : compiled by J.W. Powell
- Poynter, J. W. - Christadelphiansism
- Proctor, Don - The Christadelphians : are they of the household of faith?
- Roberts, Robert - Christendom Astray from the Bible
- Roberts, Robert - Christ's Doctrine of Eternal Life
- Roberts, Robert - Coming Events in the East
- Roberts, Robert - A Declaration of First Principles of the Oracles of the Deity
- Roberts, Robert - Dr. Thomas: His Life and work
- Roberts, Robert - England and Egypt
- Roberts, Robert - England's Ruin
- Roberts, Robert - Epitome of the Commandments of Christ
- Roberts, Robert - Everlasting Punishments Not Eternal Torments
- Roberts, Robert - The Kingdom of God
- Roberts, Robert - The Law of Moses
- Roberts, Robert - Robert Roberts, Born 1839 - Died 1898
- Roberts, Robert - The Sect Everywhere Spoken About
- Roberts, Robert - The Slain Lamb
- Roberts, Robert - The Trial
- Roberts, Robert - The Truth in the Nineteenth Century
- Roberts, Robert - Was Jesus of Nazareth the Messiah?
- Roberts, Robert - Ways of Providence
- Roberts, Robert & J. Andrew - Resurrectional Responsibilities Debate
- Roberts, Robert and C. C. Walker - The Ministry of the Prophets
- Rumble, Leslie - The anti-immortals : a reply to the Rationalists, Jehovah Witnesses, Adventists and Christadelphians
- Tennant, Harry - The Christadelphians: what they believe and preach
- Thomas, John - The Apostasy Unveiled
- Thomas, John - The Book Unsealed
- Thomas, John - Catechesis
- Thomas, John - The Destiny of Human Governments in the Light of Scripute
- Thomas, John - The Destiny of the British Empire as revealed in the Scriptures
- Thomas, John - Elpis Israel
- Thomas, John - Eureka
- Thomas, John - The Faith in the Last Days
- Thomas, John - The Holy Spirit Not a Present Possession
- Thomas, John - Odology: An Antidote to Spiritualism
- Thomas, John - Phanerosis - Exosition of the doctrine of the Old Testament
- Thomas, John - The Revealed Mystery
- Thomas, John - The Roman Question or the Fall of the Papacy
- Thomas, John - What Is the Truth?
- Thomas, John - Who Are the Christadelphians?
- Thompson, William Lester - A study of the theology of Dr. John Thomas, founder of the Christadelphians
- Turner, F. W. - The Exclusiveness of Christianity
- Turney, Edward - Ereuna: being an answer to R. Govett's "Christadelphians not Christians."
- Walker, C. C. - Rome and the Christadelphians
- Walker, C. C. - The Word of God
- Walker, Joseph Viccars - The Christadelphians and their doctrine
- Whittaker, Harry - Letters to George and Jenny : a book for young Christadelphians
- Williams, Thomas - Life and Work of Thomas Williams
- Wilson, Andrew R. - The history of the Christadelphians, 1864-1885 : the emergence of a denomination
- Wilson, Bryan R. - Sects and society: a sociological study of the Elim Tabernacle, Christian Science, and Christadelphians
- Yearsley, W. R. - Working with the grain : chips and sawdust at the bench and the cross grain of life : reflections on secular and spiritual values, a family record
