= Frank Jannaway =

F. G. Jannaway (London 1859–1935) was an English Christadelphian writer on Jewish settlement in Palestine, and notable for his role in the conscientious objector tribunals of World War I. His reaction to controversy was to separate from others in the name of purity, and he was instrumental in the formation of minority factions, such as the Berean Christadelphians. However, this reasoning eventually caused him to separate even from his own brother, A.T. Jannaway.

Frank George Jannaway was born in Kensington, Brompton on 17 October 1859. He was the seventh child and third son of William Jannaway (1814–86) and Caroline Amelia (née Wiltsheare) (1831-77). He became a Christadelphian on 11 July 1875 by full immersion following his two elder brothers William John (1847–1882) and Arthur Thomas Jannaway (1854–1938).

== Speaker and debater ==
Jannaway gave regular public lectures at the South London Ecclesia first at Westminster, from 1882 then at Islington and Clapham, and was a notable debater. His debates were not just on doctrinal subjects (e.g. 1894), but also, more unusually for Christadelphians, on the subject of Christian Socialism (1908, 1909).

- 1894 public debate with Rev. William Henry Jones, Curate of St. Paul's, Llanelli, on the immortality of the soul.
- 1908 Which is the Remedy? Verbatim report of debate on Socialism between Mr. F. G. Jannaway and Rev. N.E. Egerton-Swann. Monday, November 23, 1908, etc. (1909, 2nd ed.)
- 1909 Ought Christians to be Socialists? Debate with the "red vicar" Rev. Conrad Noel on Jannaway's "A Godless Socialism".

== Jewish Settlement in Palestine ==
Christadelphians had taken an active interest in not just predicting, but actually assisting in a Jewish return to Palestine since 1891 when Roberts called on the Christadelphian community to support Laurence Oliphant's appeal for funds for the Rosh Pinna settlement at Al-Ja'una in Galilee. But even among Christadelphians F.G. Jannaway expressed exceptionally strong sympathy for the return of the Jews to Palestine. His two books which deal with this Palestine and the Jews (1914) and Palestine and the Powers (2nd Ed. 1918) were summarized and referenced in an overtly Zionist appeal Palestine and the world (1907, 1922): "F.G. Jannaway has for long been known for his interest in and strong sympathy with the return of the Jews to Palestine."

F.G. Jannaway visited Palestine eight times, in 1901, 1902, 1912, 1914, 1922, 1925, 1928 and 1930. He was accompanied on all these trips by his wife Rosa (née Thirtle, daughter of George Farrar Thirtle (1821-1900) and Ann (née Tuttle) (1825-80)) and in 1901, 1902 and 1914 by Charles Curwen Walker, editor of The Christadelphian. He and his wife also travelled to Russia in 1903 in furtherance of his interest in prophecy and to U.S.A. and Canada in 1914 on a speaking tour.

== Conscientious Objection ==
The Christadelphian name itself, and to an extent the defined limits of the movement, had first arisen in 1863-1864 as a direct response to the draft in the American Civil War. As the clouds of war gathered in Europe the South London Ecclesia urged a petition for Christadelphians to obtain status as conscientious objectors in 1913, but Walker and other Birmingham brethren had not been convinced of the need. The Birmingham "Temperance Hall" Ecclesia initially took the view that work as "non-combatants", for example stretcher bearers, was acceptable, but Jannaway strongly urged that this was still participating in the war. In 1914 Jannaway undertook the compilation of a register of all brethren likely to be affected by the draft, with the objective to keep the Christadelphian body entirely outside the Army. In doing so he succeeded in obtaining signatures from 154 Christadelphian "ecclesias" across Britain, with the notable exception of Temperance Hall, which had already drafted, its own petition of 1,000 members, leaving open the issue of non-combatants, but hesitated to submit it to Parliament. On 11 February 1915 Arnold Stephenson Rowntree, the Quaker Liberal M.P. for York presented Jannaway's petition to Parliament, which was accepted and made Birmingham's petition irrelevant. However the Birmingham brethren continued to have more flexible views than South London on the subject, leading to problems which were to extend beyond the war itself.

== The Christadelphian Divisions 1885–1923 ==
In 1885, when F.G. Jannaway was 25, his older brother A.T. Jannaway, then 31, became involved in the first of a series of "controversies" which would mark, and hamper, the development of the Christadelphian movement in London. A.T. Jannaway strongly supported the position of Robert Roberts. In 1894–98 A.T and F.G. were directly involved in reaction to a second controversy which had originated in London, nominally over "resurrectional responsibility". Although the immediate problem had been resolved by the original source of the teaching, J.J. Andrew, having withdrawn himself in 1901, the Jannaway brothers were instrumental in persuading the influential Birmingham Central Ecclesia, who then met at Temperance Hall, and the then editor of The Christadelphian magazine, C.C. Walker, to take a stricter line over all those who failed to adopt the 1898 "Amendment" to their statements of faith, leading to the division of ecclesias in North America, and separation from the Unamended Christadelphians, led by Thomas Williams of Chicago. Then in 1923 F.G. Jannaway created further division when he broke with Walker, his former travelling companion in Palestine, when Birmingham failed to discipline two of their "Arranging Brethren" who had abstained on a vote to "disfellowship" two members serving as special constables. This new split led to the formation of the Berean Christadelphians with a majority of Christadelphians in London lining up behind the Jannaway brothers. This coincided with the Jannaway brothers' support for William Smallwood in North America who led the remaining Amended Christadelphians to separate for what would be a period of twenty-nine years (1923–1952).

The 1923 division proved to be the last major division within the Christadelphian movement, and after the departure of Clapham the mood in the main "Central" grouping turned towards efforts for reunions, effected 1952–1957. However, in the Clapham group the doctrine of fellowship held by the Jannaway brothers, effectively guilt by association, led to further splintering. In 1926, when F.G. was 62, and his brother A.T. was 68, the brothers themselves divided over the question of the permissibility of divorce in cases of adultery. A.T., who took the more lenient view and had advanced that it was allowable, had to leave Clapham, and formed the Family Journal fellowship. F.G. Jannaway also separated from another influential speaker, Viner Hall.

== Publications ==
General:

- The British Museum with Bible in hand,: Being an interesting and intelligent survey of all the exhibits on view at the British Museum which confirm the absolute accuracy of the Holy Scriptures 1921
- The Bible, and how it came to us Sampson, Low, Marston & Co.
- My new Bible 1915
- Bible Times and Seasons: With illustrations from the Books of Daniel and Revelation 1923, Sampson, Low, Marston & Co. Ltd.
- A Bible student in Bible lands 1926
- A Happy World
- "Christians" Not CHRISTIANS - An Indictment of Christendom
- How long? 1919

Debate and doctrinal:

- Llanelly Debate - Is the soul immortal? 1894
- Nottingham Debate on Christadelphian Doctrines 1895
- Derby Debate - Does man continue to exist between death and resurrection? 1902
- Brixton Debate - Do the Holy Scriptures teach that Christ is literally coming to earth again to reign thereon? 1903
- Debate on Socialism 1908
- A godless socialism: Or, The "hanging of Haman with his own rope" : a criticism of the uncertain sounds of Robert Blatchford concerning "God and my neighbour", and "Britain for the British" 1908
- The Salvation Army and the Bible - a lecture 1909
- Satan's biography or the Devil of "Christendom," contrasted with the Devil of the Bible 1909
- The Triune God of the Church of England, etc. Two letters by Frank George Jannaway 1913
- Christadelphian Answers - dealing with all kinds of difficulties, objections, arguments and questions 1920
- Christadelphian Treasury - follow-up to Christadelphian Answers 1921
- Christadelphian Facts - follow-up to Christadelphian Treasury 1921
- The Worst Enemies of the Bible. An indictment of the pulpit 1932

Palestine:

- Frank G. Jannaway Palestine and the Powers. The intentions and aims of Russia, Germany, Britain, and Turkey, regarding the Zionist movement, in the light of prophecy. 2nd ed. 1918
- Palestine and the Jews: Or, the Zionist movement an evidence that the Messiah will soon appear in Jerusalem to rule the whole world therefrom 1914
- Palestine and the World.

Conscientious objection:

- Without the Camp. Being the story of why and how the Christadelphians were exempted from military service. With plates and with a supplement 1917
- Christadelphians and Military Service 1918
- Lest We Forget or Have Forgotten: being a timely reminder and a warning against non-combatant service in time of war by Christadelphians 1923
- Christadelphians during the Great War 1929

Berean Christadelphian:

- Ed. Christ Our Passover; or, true Christadelphian teaching concerning the one great offering, etc. 1925
- Ed. Christadelphians Then and Now. A plea for the Birmingham statement of faith 1927
- Solemn Warnings concerning Christadelphian Apostasy 1927
- Ed. 1928 Berean Christadelphian edition of Roberts' Christendom astray from the Bible
- Christadelphians and Fellowship. Reasons for the Birmingham Statement of Faith 1934
