= Unamended Christadelphians =

Christian denomination

The Unamended Christadelphians are a "fellowship" within the broader Christadelphian movement worldwide, found only in the United States and Canada. They are, like all Christadelphians, millennialist and non-Trinitarian. The term Unamended Christadelphians is not the formal name of this community but is used informally to identify the grouping since a statement of faith traditionally used by many in this community is the "Unamended Statement of Faith". Similarly, most of the much larger grouping of Amended Christadelphians traditionally use a statement of faith that has been amended and therefore, in North America is known by the prefix "Amended". Nevertheless, Christadelphians worldwide and both Amended and Unamended Christadelphians in North America share fundamentally the same doctrines, with a few exceptions.

The name Christadelphian derives from the Koine Greek meaning “Brethren of Christ”. Like all Christadelphians, The Unamended Christadelphians’ have neither formal, ordained, or paid clergy.

== Doctrine ==
In general the following description of doctrine is also true of all Christadelphians worldwide. The particular clauses relating to Christ's "condemned nature" and to the effects of baptism may be more distinctive to traditional Unamended Christadelphian positions in North America, though these are not held by all Unamended Christadelphians.

See section below Reunions and Unity Efforts.

The Unamended Christadelphians’ understanding of the nature and person of Jesus Christ, the nature of man, and millennial expectations sets the group apart from the majority of Christian denominations.

Unamended Christadelphians are staunchly non-Trinitarian. The belief that Jesus Christ is not co-equal or co-eternal with but rather subordinate to God the Father is a fundamental doctrine. Furthermore, the Unamended Christadelphians maintain the Holy Spirit is not a distinct member of the Godhead, but the manifestation of God’s power. As such, these doctrines are contrary to the Nicene Creed. The group, while non-Trinitarian, are not adoptionists. The Unamended Christadelphians affirm a belief in the Virgin Birth of Jesus as the literal son of God and Mary.

An additional distinguishing feature of doctrine is the teaching on the nature of man, particularly the rejection of a belief in a Platonic immortal soul. Unamended Christadelphians contend the Bible does not teach the soul is an immortal component of mankind. Therefore, the group does not proclaim the afterlife is the soul’s ascension to heaven or descent to eternal punishment in hell. Hell is merely the grave.

In addition to teaching the complete mortality of mankind, Unamended Christadelphians also teach that because of Adam and Eve's disobedience in the Garden of Eden, mankind is inherently sinful and separated from God from birth. Through breaking God's law they created a breach in their relationship with God, and were destined to die. The very nature of mankind was no longer “very good” (Genesis 1), but became unclean in God's sight. Humans inherit this fallen nature from their progenitors, Adam and Eve. By birth, mankind is separated from God. Unamended Christadelphians believe that because Adam and Eve ceased to be very good, their children could not be born very good, or of a nature that is acceptable to God. This understanding is used to explain infant deaths. No person is held personally responsible or guilty for Adam's transgression.

This understanding of the nature of man extends to Jesus Christ, since he was born of a woman. The Unamended teach Jesus, like all mankind, was born into a state separated from God. Despite having a sinful nature as the result of his humanity he did not commit any personal sins, making him the only acceptable sacrifice to atone for the condemned nature of mankind. His sacrificial death (shedding of blood) was necessary to atone for the condemned nature he had like all mankind. He was not a substitute for all men, but a representative, because he also benefited from the redemptive work of his death.

Unamended Christadelphians believe that a correct understanding of God's plan, a life lived in accordance with God's values and Christ's commandments, and baptism into Christ's name are necessary for salvation. By baptism, mankind may also escape their inherited condemnation to death and enter an atoned state, justified before God. Following the New Testament examples, only adult immersions are considered valid baptisms. The Unamended do not baptize infants, or those who do not profess a knowledge of and agree with these outlined doctrinal positions. Furthermore, the Unamended do not preach a doctrine of “once saved always saved”. Faithful service is required after baptism for salvation; however, they widely believe that salvation cannot be earned, but that it is the free gift of God to those children of His that faithfully seek Him, through His son, Jesus Christ.

Since, under Unamended Christadelphian doctrines, the hope of mankind does not depend on an immortal soul, the group proclaims a bodily resurrection of the dead at the literal return of Jesus Christ to the earth. The purpose of resurrection is for judgment of the servants of Jesus Christ. This eschatological interpretation of Biblical prophecy means the Unamended Christadelphians are millennialists. Unamended Christadelphians see the return of Jesus as setting up the literal kingdom of Israel on earth. The kingdom will be worldwide and last for 1,000 years, after which sin and death will be completely eradicated and “God will be all in all.”(1 Corinthians 15:28)

Further distinguishing the Unamended Christadelphians from other Christian denominations is the absence of any church hierarchy or compensated clergy. (See "Organization" below.) The group believes in an inerrancy of the Bible and no other word of modern or ancient times is considered divinely inspired.

== Historical development ==
=== Foundation ===
The Christadelphian movement developed through the preaching efforts of a British physician, John Thomas (1805–1871). With the death of Thomas in 1871, Christadelphian meetings continued. Since no formal hierarchical structure existed within Christadelphians (see Organization), the death of the founding member was a sad occurrence, but did not result in a collapse of the denomination. Lippy commented this phenomenon was one of the unique features of Christadelphians. Each individual meeting continued as an independent unit. Scriptural instruction and cohesion was aided by the work of Roberts in Birmingham, England in the 1860s and in the 1880s Thomas Williams in Chicago, Illinois. Both men traveled to local meetings edifying the brotherhood, and served as editors of The Christadelphian and The Christadelphian Advocate periodicals, respectively.

=== Statement of Faith & Division of Christadelphian Fellowships ===
Local statements of faith had been written by local congregations since the 1850s, but formal declarations of faith determining fellowship were not utilized until 1862–1864, the years when Christadelphians began to change from an informal movement into a defined denomination. In America the registration of "groups of believers" and the coining of the name Christadelphian (Ogle County Illinois, 1863) coincided with the British arm of the movement taking a fixed stand against belief in a supernatural devil (Edinburgh, 1863).

The statement of faith (or creed, or confession of faith) used by most Unamended Christadelphians today has its origins in the 1877 statement of faith of the Birmingham Central Ecclesia, Britain (known as the Birmingham Statement of Faith, or BSF). This 1877 statement was partly a response to a doctrinal dispute 1873–1877 between congregations in Britain. The doctrine in dispute was known as “Renunciationism”, “Free life”, or “Turneyism” after the originator Edward Turney of Nottingham. Turney essentially preached Jesus Christ was "not born of a condemned nature" (that is a "free life") and therefore he did not benefit in any way from his own death. The doctrine was argued against by Robert Roberts in Birmingham and John James Andrew in London among others.

The 1877 BSF already had some informal status as a benchmark in Britain and overseas due to the Birmingham Central Ecclesia being where the editorship of The Christadelphian Magazine was based at the time, but equally local ecclesias usually had their own local statements with similar wording, and continued to do.

The 1877 BSF begins with, “A statement of the ‘One Faith,’ upon which the Christadelphian Ecclesia of Birmingham is founded; together with a specification of the fables current in the religious world, of which they require a rejection on the part of all applying for their fellowship.” It contained seventeen provisions outlining the “Truth to be Believed” and seventeen “Fables to be Refused”. This statement of beliefs became basis of fellowship for the majority of Christadelphian meetings in England and North America. Those disagreeing with the Birmingham positions left fellowship. During the next ten years the organization and wording of the statement was revised, but no doctrinal changes were made.

A significant change was the addition of a "Foundation Clause" in 1885 about inspiration. This removed a large part of the British Christadelphian movement into the "Suffolk St." (name of the location of the second major ecclesia in Birmingham) or "Fraternal visitor" (name of the group's magazine) "fellowship". In the same year, March 1885, Thomas Williams commenced publication of The Christadelphian Advocate Magazine in Waterloo, Iowa. Williams supported Birmingham Temperance Hall's addition to BSF 1877 of the new "Foundation Clause", and therefore the "disfellowship" of the Suffolk St. group. Williams also approved Robert's position related to Edward Turney 12 years earlier, though Turney's Nazarene fellowship had already effectively petered out with his death in 1879 and the return to the main grouping of his supporter David Handley in 1881.

In 1898 a third division of Christadelphians occurred, this time over “resurrectional responsibility”. Since Christadelphians teach a bodily resurrection and judgment at the return of Jesus Christ to earth, the controversy was over who would be resurrected and called to judgment. At question was whether or not persons who knew the word of God but were not baptised would be judged and condemned for rejecting the “Truth”, subsequently called in Unamended literature “enlightened rejectors”. Although the exact phrase was not used in Britain, the Sydney Australia ecclesia had already excommunicated "ten who are not able to see that unbaptised and knowing rejectors of the truth are responsible" in 1884. And this action had been defended by the editor Robert Roberts. Nevertheless, the Birmingham Central Ecclesia did not immediately add this to their statement of faith, though some ecclesias did so. The statement of the North London ecclesia in 1887 read "Resurrection affects those only who are responsible to God by a knowledge of His revealed will". In 1894 J.J. Andrew of North London published a booklet 'Blood of the Covenant' in which he argued that no unbaptised would be raised and judged. On April 3 and 5, 1894 a debate was held on "Resurrectional Responsibility" between Roberts and Andrew, and on April 15 Islington Temperance Hall ecclesia, London, passed as resolution to separate from Barnsbury Hall ecclesia, London. The controversy continued 1894–1898. Roberts was absent from the UK in 1897 and died in 1898 in San Francisco, so opposition to J.J. Andrew was left to A.T. Jannaway and Frank Jannaway at London Clapham, and Charles Curwen Walker, the deputy editor in Birmingham.

In 1898 following the examples of London Islington and some other London ecclesias the Birmingham Central meeting amended Clause 24 of BSF to read “the responsible (namely, those who know the revealed will of God, and have been called upon to submit to it)” in BASF, where the original 1877 BSF had stated only the “responsible (faithful and unfaithful)” would be judged. The change in wording was to emphasize that some individuals who were not baptized would be called to the judgment seat of Christ along with all baptized individuals, and that the reason for resurrection was knowledge of God's will, not an association with Christ’s sacrifice. Some Christadelphians consider that there are larger doctrinal implications involving the change. (For example, Williams, Lippy, Farrar, and Pursell outline larger doctrinal problems.) There are also Christadelphians who consider this a stand-alone issue, and point to the fact that no other clause of the BSF was amended. In theory the change made recognition that some unbaptised would be raised and judged a requirement of fellowship. However this was not pushed outside London and other areas like Yorkshire where Andrew's influence had been strongest. The London Clapham brethren led by Frank Jannaway urged all ecclesias who did not already have "amendments" prior to 1898 to adopt the new Birmingham amendment, and made it a fellowship issue in London, although the new editor Charles Curwen Walker in Birmingham and his assistant Henry Sulley in Nottingham did not push the issue.

In the U.K. the new 1898 Birmingham Amended Statement of Faith (BASF) replaced BSF 1884 as a 'touchstone' but did not cause a significant division in Britain outside London, and even today many British ecclesias continue to have either local statements predating 1884, 1877, or modern statements. However the result of the amendment was a division of the Christadelphians in North America where the community separated into "Amended" (those using the new BASF), and "Unamended" those using the old BSF, or in 1909, the BUSF.

Subsequently, J.J. Andrew separated from most of his own supporters, including John Owler of Barnsbury Hall, Islington ecclesia in London, and Albert Hall of the Sowerby Bridge ecclesia in Yorkshire, and Andrew was reportedly rebaptised in 1901, dying in 1907. However the division lingered on with Hall and Owler as "unamended" in Britain and Thomas Williams as "unamended" editor of The Advocate in Chicago. Williams visited Britain in 1903–04 at Owler and Hall's invitation, supporting their position against the "amendment", also urging the British "Unamended" (known as the "Up and be doing" movement) not to join with the large "Suffolk St" group.

In 1909, the BUSF was revised and clarified in both title and in six propositions. “Birmingham” was dropped from the title and only the “palable errors .. none of which, however, causes doctrinal trouble” were changed. Thomas Williams, editor of the Advocate, explained:

“It is a mistake to think that we intended to get up another Statement of Faith. The one we have published is the Old Birmingham Statement, with a few corrections made, which the original writers of it would have made if their attention had been called to the errors – not serious errors of doctrine, but yet errors that were awkward. The reason for calling it “The Christadelphian Statement,” and omitting “Birmingham” lies against calling it “The Chicago,” etc. It is undesirable to have any place named as more prominent than others. Therefore it is “The Christadelphian Statement of Faith,” and each ecclesia can have its own address printed on the cover, as many are now doing.”

The amendment in the UK had little lasting effect other than moving a number of meetings from "Central" to "Suffolk St" groupings. Both John Owler and Albert Hall emigrated to North America, where first Owler then Hall subsequently succeeded Thomas Williams (died 1913) as editors of The Advocate. From America Owler urged the few British "Unamended" (the "Up and be doing" movement) to join with the larger "Suffolk St." grouping in 1920, creating a bond also between the US Unamended and editor of the Fraternal Visitor in Britain, Thomas Turner. "Suffolk St." reunited with "Central" in 1957.

=== Different versions of BSF, BASF and BUSF ===
Christadelphian statements of faith based on the Birmingham models (BSF 1877, BSF 1885, BASF 1898, BUSF 1909, etc.), and also some other Christadelphian statements of faith, follow the format:

- 1. "Truth to be received" – a list of 31 positive clauses. Numbering in BASF and BUSF is slightly different, since the unnumbered "Foundation Clause" on inspiration added to BSF in 1885 becomes clause 31 in BUSF. Additionally clauses 24,25,26,27 in BUSF are numbered 27,24,25,26 in BASF.
- 2. "Doctrines to be rejected" – originally an ad-hoc list of teachings which had been barred from the "platform" at Birmingham Temperance Hall compiled 1864–1897 as problems were encountered. For some Christadelphian ecclesias this list was "frozen in time" in 1898 (BASF) or 1909 (BUSF), however other ecclesias have added new "DTBRs". Some "Central" Christadelphians may also add DTBRs in this fashion.
- 3. "Commandments of Christ" – originally in BSF 1877 a collection of 53 verses (to allow for 52 or 53 Sundays in a year) which "presiding brethren" at Birmingham Temperance Hall once read to conclude the ecclesial announcements on Sunday morning.

=== Reunions and Unity Efforts ===
From 1923–1952 the "Amended" community in North America again divided, again following the lines of a local split in London, England, with the majority forming the "Berean Fellowship" in North America. The minority in North America who remained in fellowship with Britain became known as "Central Fellowship". In a reunion in 1952, The Jersey City Resolution, the two Amended groups were reconciled and today the terms "Central" and "Amended" are used interchangeably in North America. This split 1923–1952 did not affect the Unamended community.

In 1957 two further reunions in Britain and Australia corrected an earlier division dating from 1886 between "Suffolk Street" and "Central". This had the effect of uniting almost all Christadelphians outside North America into one grouping. Those in Central who held that the reasons for separation from the Suffolk Street Fellowship remained, opposed the re-union and formed the Old Paths Fellowship.

From the 1970s onwards various attempts have been made to bring about reunion in North America, but have made little progress outside of the Pacific Coast, where all Christadelphians are now "Central". Reunion efforts continue in the Midwest and Canada.

The current situation is complicated by the presence of a part of the Unamended grouping who hold views compatible with the main worldwide body of Christadelphians and who have succeeded in doctrinal agreement with the "Amended" arm of that body in North America, but have not so far found ways to implement that doctrinal agreement as a basis for fellowship. Some Unamended ecclesias have formally taken the Amended grouping's position on the issue of resurrectional responsibility.

Parallel to the above unity efforts in North America between Amended Christadelphians and some Unamended Christadelphians, are efforts by Amended Christadelphians and some Unamended Christadelphians to achieve unity with the CGAF. The fourth grouping (in terms of numbers) the Berean Christadelphians, stand aside from all unity discussions as an exclusive fellowship.

As described by Wilson and Lippy, in general aside from the progress, or otherwise, of local and national unity efforts, Christadelphians in North America continue to regard members of other fellowships as "brethren" and inside the larger denominational circle.

=== Classification ===
Locating the Unamended Christadelphians within larger Christendom is not an easy endeavor. According to the Encyclopedia of American Religions the Unamended Christadelphians are members of the Baptist tradition of Christian denominations, based on their historical split with the Campbelites (Church of Christ / Disciples of Christ). The Unamended Christadelphians share an eschewing of infant baptism with the Anabaptists of the Reformation. However, the American Religious Data Archives includes Christadelphians under the “Other Group” denominational profiles. As outlined above, the group's doctrinal positions are contrary to most mainstream Christianity, and are recognized to view both Catholic and Protestant denominations as having lost the 1st century beliefs of the apostles. The Unamended Christadelphians could also be identified as one of the 19th century restoration movements, which would better suit their open proclamation that mainstream Christianity is corrupted and adheres to false beliefs. Paul Conkin, in book on American religious reformers, wrote that Unamended Christadelphians remain “the only sect that blends an extreme restorationist or primitivist bent with separatism and Adventism." The millennialism or adventism faith of the Unamended Christadelphians has also grouped the denomination into a broad category with Jehovah’s Witnesses and the Seventh-day Adventist Church, despite obvious doctrinal differences.

The previously mentioned references classify Christadelphians as a denomination, but few make the distinction between the differing fellowships. In The Christadelphians in North America, Charles Lippy concluded the Unamended Christadelphians were best considered a sect based on the definitions of sociologists like Max Weber, Ernst Troeltsch and Richard Niebuhr. However, he noted the Unamended Christadelphians do not completely fit any single sect typology.

== Organization & worship ==
The fundamental organizational unit of the Unamended Christadelphians is the local ecclesia. Ecclesia is the transliteration of the Greek ἐκκλησία, the common Greek word for assembly, and is usually translated “church” in the King James Version (example 1 Corinthians 15:19). The word “church” was rejected because of the association with larger Christendom, and it does not have the meaning of an assembly of separated ones. In 2006, the number of organized North American Unamended Christadelphian ecclesias in listed in their “Ecclesial Directory” was 83. Ecclesias were located in twenty-six states and two Canadian provinces. These counts do not include those individuals and families living in areas without an organized ecclesia (so-called isolation). The Unamended have always been few in number, with approximately 1,850 baptized adult members in 2006. The Unamended are a much smaller group than the Central fellowship, which is worldwide and has as many as 50,000 members. Ecclesia size ranges from less than ten baptized members to nearly one hundred. The existence of very small ecclesias has been a feature throughout Christadelphian history. Small ecclesias usually meet in member’s homes for worship services, whereas larger ecclesias usually own or rent a building to serve as a meeting hall. The ecclesia is attended by baptized members, their children, and un-baptized individuals (sometimes referred to as “friends of the Truth” or “guests”).

Number of ecclesias and members, by year 
 		Members 	
Year (source)	Ecclesias  Unamended  No distinction made
1936[12]        109        2,755	
1984[12]                  ~6,000	
1997[10]         95       ~2,000     (2)	
2006[19]         83       ~1,850     (2)	
(2) Baptized adults only

The decrease in the number of both Unamended ecclesias and members over the past 30 years can be attributed to a number of previously Unamended ecclesias adopting the BASF, and officially becoming Central, or "Amended" ecclesias; most notably in California.

Baptized males (“brethren” or “brothers”) assume all administration, teaching, and leadership duties in the ecclesia. All duties are uncompensated and on a volunteer basis. Brothers fulfilling the administrative roles (secretary, treasurer, etc.) are selected either by vote of the baptized ecclesial members, by drawing lots, or by virtue of being the only males in the ecclesia. Baptized men in good standing with the ecclesia preside over the memorial service, offer prayers, lecture and teach adult classes. Baptized women (“sisters”) may vote in ecclesia decisions, but do not assume any of the duties taken on by the brethren. Most ecclesias meet at least twice weekly. Once on Sunday for exhortation, the memorial service, and Sunday school. The sisters frequently teach the children’s Sunday school classes. In addition, many ecclesias will meet during the week for Bible study. Some ecclesias also have sisters’ classes, or young persons’ classes during the week.

Each ecclesia is an autonomous entity. No larger formal hierarchical structure exists among the Unamended Christadelphians. Each individual ecclesia is responsible for issues of fellowship and instruction. By historical agreement, individual ecclesias respect each other’s decisions on fellowship regarding an individual. Ecclesias are linked or networked together via three mechanisms. First, publications, particularly the Christadelphian Advocate, serve to spread ecclesial news and propagate Christadelphian doctrines. The Advocate has been so influential, that the Unamended are sometimes referred to as the “Advocate ecclesias”. Second, national or regional fraternal meetings known as Bible schools and gatherings connect a dispersed body. Both Bible schools and gatherings are usually annual occurrences hosted by a local ecclesia, with the only distinction being length. Bible schools traditionally last one week, and gatherings a (long) weekend. At Bible schools and gatherings individuals are exposed to guest teachers and lectures and meet fellow believers from different ecclesias. Both of publications and fraternal meetings maintain doctrinal order through essentially a system of peer-review. Thirdly, family ties link ecclesias across the nation. Family ties are prominent, given the statement of faith lists marriage with an unbelieving person is a belief to be rejected.

== Social views ==
Based on Biblical texts, such as James 4:4 (“Ye adulterers and adulteresses, know ye not that the friendship of the world is enmity with God? whosoever therefore will be a friend of the world is the enemy of God.”) and 1 John 2:15–16 (“Love not the world, neither the things that are in the world. If any man love the world, the love of the Father is not in him. For all that is in the world, the lust of the flesh, and the lust of the eyes, and the pride of life, is not of the Father, but is of the world.”), the Unamended see the world as fundamentally evil and in contrast to God’s will. Therefore, baptized members see themselves as “strangers and pilgrims on earth”(Heb 11:13) and preach a degree of separatism from the world at large. This is not a monastic view, but attempt to prefer biblical study and fellowship over the offerings of the world.

Unamended Christadelphians recognize the world as belonging to God, and they are servants of God and Christ. They refrain from politics, voting, and jury duty. From the founding of the Christadelphians, the group have been conscientious objectors.
