= Nazarene fellowship =

The Nazarene fellowship were an offshoot from Christadelphians from 1873 to 1881, led by Edward Turney (1820–1879) of Nottingham and David Handley (1822–1886) of Maldon. They were sometimes called "renunciationists" and their teaching called "free life" and "clean flesh". They separated over the atonement. The division was relatively short-lived, with most of the 200 people who had left returning within the next few years. Following his death in 1879, Turney's most active supporter, Handley, returned to the main grouping. The group gradually died out. In the 1950s Ernest Brady revived Turney's cause and the name of the group.

== History ==
=== Background ===
In 1871, the year of the death of John Thomas in America, Robert Roberts was editor of The Christadelphian magazine in Birmingham, England. Perhaps second only in prominence to Roberts was a Nottingham businessman, Edward Turney. Turney was a prominent Christadelphian speaker at "fraternal gatherings". And editor of The Christadelphian Lamp (later renamed The Christian lamp).

The "Renunciationist controversy" began with the teaching of David Handley who first raised the idea that Christ was born with a "free life" – meaning that had he not submitted to his Father's will and death on the cross, he would still have been granted immortality, but renounced this of his own choice. Turney had in early 1873 published a booklet Diabolism which included the statement that "sin was an element of the flesh of the Son of God" but during the spring of 1873 came to renounce this view and came to support and promote Handley's view in his magazine, then on 28 August 1873 as guest lecturer for the Birmingham Ecclesia, which met at Temperance Hall, Temple Street, Birmingham, forcefully taught these views at the large influential Birmingham Ecclesia. In response Roberts and the other "Arranging Brethren" of Temperance Hall called together the general membership of the Birmingham Ecclesia and invited them to declare their rejection of Turney and Handley's teachings. Turney's views were roundly rejected but not everyone at Birmingham was happy with the way in which it was done.

Turney's main writings were The Sacrifice of Christ and The Two Sons of God. Roberts' response to Turney is found in the booklet The Slain Lamb.

The fallout for Christadelphians was not significant outside Nottingham and Maldon. In October 1873 shortly after Turney had left, Roberts was able to declare that 'With the exception of Nottingham, Maldon and Plymouth it [Renunciationism] has failed to establish a footing anywhere." However, Turney had been a very active preacher, and in 1872 more conversions to Christadelphian belief (as baptisms) were recorded in Nottingham as a result of Turney's preaching than in Birmingham where Roberts was based. After 1873 the number of baptisms in Nottingham dropped off sharply, as the small remaining ecclesia carried on led by younger brethren such as Henry Sulley – who had only been baptised two years prior to the 1873 split. The Christadelphian ecclesia in Nottingham did not regain momentum until the death of Turney five years later (1879) and the return of many, not all who had left during 1879–1882. A. Wilson notes that during the period between 1864–1885 "Apart from the Inspiration Controversy, which came to a head in 1885, no other schism appears from official figures to have influenced the Christadelphian movement so much as the 'Clean Flesh' heresy". And yet by 1881 the Nazarene Fellowship schism was effectively extinct. In Nottingham, Maldon and Plymouth, of the 200 who had left most returned within the next few years.

Maldon had been a very active preaching ecclesia, and most of the baptisms prior to 1873 which occurred at Maldon had been as a result of Handley's preaching. Yet Handley had taken a less forceful role than Turney in the 1873 events. Following Turney's death in 1879, in March 1881 Handley, along with his brother Charles Handley, and Henry Howell, visited the London Ecclesia of John J. Andrew to indicate a change of position and to ask London to recommend Maldon Ecclesia's refellowship to the brotherhood – which the London Ecclesia did. A month later, Handley travelled again to London Ecclesia, and asked to be rebaptised, though the other members of Maldon rejoined the group without this action. The rebaptism took place at Handley's own request, and may have been inspired by Thomas and Roberts, both of whom were rebaptised some time after their initial baptisms when they came to a more detailed understanding of the Scriptures.

== Later influence ==
In the 1930s Fred J. Pearce, a Christadelphian miner from South Wales, took up Turney's cause and was expelled from the local Christadelphian congregation. Pearce published his views in the Nazarene Fellowship Circular Letter to a mainly Christadelphian readership.

In 1949 another Christadelphian, Brady, came to support Turney's teaching and a debate was held in Netherton, West Midlands, between Brady and Fred Barling, a well known Christadelphian writer. Brady also separated from the main Christadelphian body and following the death of Fred J. Pearce took up editorship of the Nazarene Circular Letter. Brady wrote extensively in opposition to traditional Christadelphian teachings on the atonement, "sin-in-the-flesh", God-manifestation, mortal resurrection, judgment and baptism, and he produced a large number of booklets dealing with these and other controversies. In Thinking It Over (Birmingham, 1963) Brady claimed from his discussions with other Christadelphians on a private basis that "a large proportion of Christadelphians" were in agreement with [some] Nazarene views. This claim may well be true given that many well-known Christadelphian speakers had publicly written on the atonement implicitly taking issue with some of the terms of reference of both Turney and Roberts in the original 1873 controversy. For example James Norris, and Harry Whittaker, but such writers stay actively within the main Christadelphian body. Brady's works include Doctored Christadelphianism (1974) and The Gospel that is Never Preached (nd).

Brady managed to attract the support of a very small number of former Christadelphians, and his and Turney's publications are hosted on the Nazarene Fellowship website, which also circulates The Nazarene Circular Letter – for which Russell Gregory has written editorials on Understanding the sacrifice of Christ and other topics defending Turney's teachings.

=== Current status ===
The original Nottingham and Maldon congregations of the Nazarene Fellowship died out after the death of Turney and the return to the Christadelphians of Handley. The group does not currently have any active meetings.

== Beliefs ==
Turney's teaching contained some points which are different from mainstream Christadelphian views: That the death of Jesus was a voluntary substitution for Adam and therefore for Adam's descendants. They believe Jesus voluntarily paid the penalty of inflicted death which passed upon Adam for eating the forbidden fruit, but which God remitted so that Adam could live out his life. This penalty/debt, in due time, would be paid by God's sinless Son. The Nazarene fellowship does not believe that Jesus' death was a punishment inflicted on Him by God so that we might be forgiven, and they reject the Christadelphian teaching that Jesus' death was necessary for His own salvation.
