= William Henry Boulton (author) =

To be distinguished from William Henry Boulton (1812–1874) Canadian politician.

W. H. Boulton (1869–1964) was an English writer on assyriology, transport history and religious subjects.

William Henry Boulton was born on 11 April 1869 in Clerkenwell, Middlesex, to Joseph Boulton, a brassfounder and Ann Maria Elwood. He married Charlotte Harding (1866-1919) on 15 August 1891 in Hackney, Middlesex. They settled in Ilford and had 5 children. Following the death of his first wife he remarried, to Alice Ionia Westmoreland (1877-1965) on 14 May 1921 at West Ham, Essex. W.H. Boulton died on 27 November 1964 in Birmingham at the age of 95 years.

For most of his life W.H. Boulton was employed as an auditor. His interest in assyriology was that of a gifted amateur. He became a regular author for Sampson Low, Marston & Company Ltd. on the Ancient Near East. A secondary interest was transport; on this subject his major work was The pageant of transport through the ages (1931).

W.H. Boulton was also active in the Christadelphian church, and, along with Henry Sulley, was a frequent contributor of archaeology articles in The Christadelphian magazine during the editorship of C.C. Walker. Following Boulton's retirement he relocated from London to Birmingham and assisted Walker's successor as editor John Carter.

His son, A. H. Boulton (1904–1981), was a regular contributor to The Testimony magazine.

== Works ==
Historical:

- 1924 Babylon, Assyria and Israel, their History as Recorded in the Bible and Cuneiform Inscriptions. Sampson Low, Marston & Co, 1924. 181pp.
- 1930 The Romance of Archaeology. Sampson Low, Marston & Co.
- 1931 The Romance of the British Museum. With a foreword by Sir Frederic G. Kenyon. Sampson Low, Marston & Co., London.
- 1933 Assyria. Sampson Low, Marston & Co.
- 1933 Babylonia. Sampson Low, Marston & Co.
- 1933 Elam, Media, and Persia. Sampson Low, Marston & Co.
- 1934 Greece and Rome. Sampson Low, Marston & Co.
- 1950 Palestine. Sampson Low, Marston & Co.

Transport:

- 1931 The Pageant of Transport through the Ages. With a foreword by Sir Josiah Stamp. Sampson Low, Marston & Co.
- 1932 The Splendid Book of Railways (children's book). Sampson Low, Marston & Co
- 1950 The Railways of Britain - Their History, Construction and Working. Sampson Low, Marston & Co.

Religious:

- 1917 The Apocalypse and History. With W.H. Barker.
- before 1923 The Names and Titles of the Deity.
- 1924 Epistle to the Hebrews. S. Low, Marston & Co. London.
- 1937 God-spell - The Bible Story Retold. Birmingham.
- 1946 Paul the Apostle - Jew, Tarsian, Roman.
- 1952 Archaeology Explains the Bible. Epworth, London.
- 1962 Book of the Prophet Ezekiel. Birmingham.
