= Elpis Lodge =

Elpis Lodge was a hostel provided by Christadelphians for Jewish refugee boys in Birmingham, England, from 1940 to 1948.

== Early Christadelphians and Palestine ==
From their origins in the 1840s Christadelphians held the establishment of a Jewish homeland in Palestine, as part of the "promises to Abraham", as a fundamental tenet of the church's belief. They were early supporters of the work of Laurence Oliphant around the time the Zionist movement began in 1882. In the 1880s Christadelphians in Britain collected funds to purchase of almost 61 hectares of land at Al-Ja'una in Upper Galilee. The Jewish Rosh Pinna colony accommodated 24 Romanian and 4 Russian Jewish families making a total of 140 people. Tools and large quantities of clothing were also despatched for colonies of Jewish refugees.

== Rugby Christadelphians and the Kindertransport ==
The origin of Elpis Lodge can be traced to the earlier work of Alan Overton, a Christadelphian shopkeeper from Rugby. Overton had "always had a keen interest in the Jewish people and had watched with excitement their gradual return to Palestine", to the extent that he had travelled to London to be in the audience of every major debate in Parliament over a Jewish homeland since 1918, which would include also the major debate on Jewish refugees on 21 November 1938, 11 days after Kristallnacht. Overton became involved with the new non-denominational "Movement for the Care of Children from Germany", and set up The Rugby (Christadelphian) Refugee Committee, trying to find homes and raise the £50 eventual repatriation guarantee demanded by the British government. Soon he was receiving letters from the continent from families begging for sponsors for their children. Many letters were simply addressed “OVERTON, RUGBY, ENGLAND.” Overton first concentrated on fundraising and awareness in the Christadelphian community in Britain, and by articles overseas, but also for the townspeople of Rugby, and among his fellow shopkeepers.

Overton, and other members of Rugby and other Christadelphian churches would meet the largely Quaker organised Kindertransport boat trains in London and drive the children to homes they had found. Overton also turned his house, with four young children of his own, into a transit house, but soon found that a more permanent solution was needed.

== Little Thorn Lodge, Rugby ==
The Rugby Christadelphians opened the Little Thorn Lodge on Hillmorton Road in July 1939. The home was run by a Czechoslovak Jewish refugee Mrs. Sperber, who lived there with her two sons. Overton had been able to guarantee her sponsorship in England by telephone to her while she was still serving as a cook in a concentration camp in Germany. There was only room enough for nine boys to be housed permanently, but many more would stay there temporarily until private homes were found. In total over 200 children were received by Overton's team.

== Elpis Lodge, Birmingham ==
The Birmingham and Coventry Christadelphian communities were much larger than Rugby, and having collected funds throughout the UK obtained premises for the Hostel for Refugee Boys, Elpis Lodge, 117 Gough Road, Edgbaston, Birmingham. The word Elpis, the Greek word for 'hope', was a reference to Elpis Israel, a book by the "reviver" of the religion, John Thomas who had systematized the expectation of a national return of the Jews to Palestine.

Dr. Abraham Cohen dedicated Elpis Lodge at an opening ceremony on 21 April 1940, an appropriate date, as he pointed out, because this was the Eve of Passover, the Festival of Freedom. He added "once again the Christadelphians have come to the rescue of the Jewish people" At the same ceremony a certain Bro. Laxon of the Coventry Christadelphian Ecclesia responded "We Christadelphians consider friendship for the Jews a privilege not only for the nation which shows it but for the individual who promotes it. The faith of Christadelphians is rooted in the Law which Jesus said he came not to destroy but to fulfil.”

The Birmingham Jewish community (The Representative Council of Birmingham Jewry) appointed a refugee couple, Dr Albert Hirsch and his wife as wardens. Hirsch had formerly been headmaster of the Jewish Philanthropie-Schule in Frankfurt, and were described in The Christadelphian magazine as "people of culture and learning whose hearts will be in the work". Boys later recalled that they proved warm-hearted and sensible and provided their charges with a real home. Under Dr Hirsch, discipline was strict but fair:

We couldn't go out till we'd done our allotted tasks— washing up, polishing, cleaning the windows. But otherwise we were encouraged to develop ourselves. Dr Hirsch was a good pianist and helped me to appreciate music."
The standard of living at Elpis Lodge was frugal, in any case a commonplace of wartime conditions. The boys made a weekly contribution of half their earnings, and were allowed to keep a quarter for pocket money. The rest was saved for them.

The Christadelphians made no attempt to convert the children to Christianity, believing that the return of the Jews to Israel was part of God's plan, and that an Orthodox Jewish upbringing was part of this.

In many cases it seemed the Christians, especially the Quakers and Christadelphians, understood the psychology and strain of the persecuted minorities better than their co-religionists.

The lodge finally closed in 1948, with the Hirschs hosting a party for the remaining boys and the Birmingham Jewish and Christadelphian communities, before they (the Hirsch's) emigrated to America.

For more information see the paper online by Leslie Morrell, a Berean Christadelphian, called The Christadelphian Response to the Holocaust.
