= The Testimony (magazine) =

The Testimony is a Bible magazine published monthly by the Christadelphians (Brethren in Christ).

== History ==
The Testimony was established in 1931 as 'a magazine for the study and defence of the Holy Scripture' and that, according to the magazine's website, remains its aim today. The Testimony Magazine Committee established the magazine as a supplement to community's main magazine The Christadelphian under the editorship of C. C. Walker, which carried general articles and ecclesial news. The first article of the first issue was entitled "A positive aim", written by Islip Collyer, many of whose books first appeared as series of articles in The Testimony. Other writers included W. H. Boulton, Melva Purkis, and Harry Whittaker among many others.

== Modern magazine ==
The magazine is divided into a number of sections: Exposition; Reviews; Exhortation; Watchman; Science; Principles, Preaching and Problems; Prophecy, History and Archaeology. There is an editor for each section and an overall Publishing Editor.

The Testimony is published monthly and a normal issue consists of 40 pages. One issue per year is a Special Issue devoted to a particular theme and is normally double or more the size of an ordinary issue.

The publisher of the magazine is the Testimony Committee consisting of a chairman, a secretary, a treasurer, the editors and a number of other members. All members of the committee are active members of Christadelphian congregations subscribing to the Birmingham Amended Statement of Faith.

The Testimony is published in the UK on a non-profitmaking basis and neither editors nor contributors are paid for their work. Print-ready copy is produced on a home PC, and then professionally printed and dispatched.

Subscriptions, back issues (1999 onwards), Special Issues and Basic Bible Principles (Bible inserts) are also available on The Testimony website.

== Other publications ==
Books are published on an annual basis by the Testimony Committee, often consisting of edited reprints of articles already published. A range of books are currently in print, including: -

- In the nurture and admonition of the Lord (a compilation of articles from The Testimony Magazine on the issue of Christian parenting)
- Daniel's last prophecy (an exposition of the final chapters of the Bible book of Daniel), and
- Paul's epic journey to Rome (a journey through the formative years of the Christian movement, as described in chapters 25-28 of the Acts of the Apostles).

Ordering information is available on The Testimony website.
