= Berean Christadelphians =

The Berean Christadelphians are a Christian denomination.

== History ==
In Britain the initial cause of the 1923 schism resulting in the formation of the Berean Christadelphians was concerning service in the police. Following the leading role taken by Frank G. Jannaway of the London Clapham ecclesia with government departments in pleas for the movement's recognition as conscientious objectors during the First World War, Jannaway and other South London brethren took issue with the discovery that two members at Birmingham Temperance Hall ecclesia (so known after the location of their rented rooms) were serving as special constables. This issue was doubly sensitive since Birmingham Temperance Hall was the ecclesia of Charles Curwen Walker who had succeeded Robert Roberts as editor of The Christadelphian Magazine on his death in 1898. In his study of the Christadelphians Bryan R. Wilson suggests that Walker had deferred to Jannaway during the war, and at the end of war as Birmingham returned to its former informal status of primus inter pares, the London brethren resented this. The Birmingham Temperance Hall meeting did eventually "disfellowship" the two special constables, after opposition from two Arranging Brethren of the ecclesia, A. Davis and T. Pearce, who signalled disagreement by abstaining in the final vote on the issue. The Clapham brethren then demanded of Birmingham Temperance Hall ecclesia that they also "disfellowship" A. Davis and T. Pearce for abstaining in the vote. This the brethren at Birmingham were unwilling to do, so London Clapham issued a letter "disfellowshipping" Birmingham, and more significantly any ecclesia in Britain that would not do likewise.

In 1924 the Clapham meeting split between two groups led by Frank G. Jannaway and his older brother Arthur T. Jannaway over whether the Matt.5:32 "exceptive clause" allowed divorce in cases of adultery. Those allowing the exception, led by Arthur, formed the "Family Journal" fellowship at Clapham Common Ecclesia, but did not seek to return to the main body of Christadelphians.

In 1942 most of the British Berean Christadelphians separated from North American Berean Christadelphians to form the Dawn Christadelphians – taking a stricter line than North American Bereans on divorce and remarriage. A substantial part of this group reverted to the main body of Christadelphians in 1993–1994.

=== North America ===
Prior to the developing dispute in Britain over special constables, in America another dispute had been simmering concerning the atonement. In 1913 Allen Strickler of Buffalo had written articles which were found by William Smallwood of Toronto and some others to contain a "substitution" theory of Christ's death. C.C. Walker and Birmingham were unwilling to take sides and with two ecclesias at Buffalo, both claiming to follow the Birmingham Amended Statement of Faith, Walker stated "We are not aware that the ecclesias named are at variance with us" although the two ecclesias did not fellowship each other.

The Berean magazine had commenced publication in January, 1923 at London, England. Following the division in Britain Frank Jannaway became involved in the dispute in the U.S. and in 1925 published a booklet against Strickler and supporting Smallwood. As a result of the disagreement a majority of Amended Christadelphians in North America withdrew from the main body and allied themselves with London Clapham as the Berean Christadelphians. In July 1927 Frank Jannaway circulated worldwide a letter The Christadelphians Then and Now appealing for ecclesias to "stand aside from" Birmingham and all who would not.

This schism held to the formation of a doctrine of congregational fellowship which required entire ecclesias (congregations), to withdraw from any other ecclesia in fellowship with individuals or ecclesias in error. In 1892 Frank Jannaway had already authored an article Ecclesial Fellowship, published in the Christadelphian, where he presented his own ideas on fellowship in contrast to the more accommodating attitude being taken by some of the London Christadelphians towards the then current problem with John Andrew.

=== Reunion in America ===
In 1952 the majority of the Berean Christadelphian Fellowship rejoined the "Birmingham Central" body of Christadelphians ("Temperance Hall" was now known as the "Central Fellowship", since Birmingham Central had ceased renting rooms at Temperance Hall in 1932), In doing so this large group of Berean Christadelphians abandoned their insistence on the Berean Christadelphian understanding of the atonement and fellowship, although the bloc disfellowship approach of the Bereans lingers in many Amended ecclesias today.

== Distinguishing characteristics ==
Over time the Berean Christadelphians have developed a culture which differentiates them radically from mainstream Christadelphians. They are differentiated by a number of doctrinal differences (listed after this paragraph). Some of these doctrines are shared with some of the "Unamended Fellowship" (but not the majority Christadelphian group known as the "Central Fellowship"), particularly beliefs on the atonement and what the Bible teaches about human nature (referred to commonly as 'the flesh'). Some of these doctrines are beliefs which the original Berean Christadelphians held in 1923, whilst others are later developments. A number of these beliefs are not held by any other Christadelphian fellowship, which the Berean Christadelphians take as indicative that they hold the correct understanding of the gospel.

The following is a list of beliefs which differentiate the Bereans from mainstream Christadelphians:

- The Berean Christadelphian position on congregational fellowship (described above)
- That sin is a physical substance which is the cause of moral transgression, disease and death
- That babies die because they are made of this physical substance which is sin (and so inherit the wages of sin)
- That although the Bible uses the word 'sin' in two different senses, it always refers to only one thing and not two separate things since sin and the cause of sin are one and the same
- That God treats both sin and the cause of sin in the same way
- That Jesus earned the wages of sin
- That John Thomas (founder of the Christadelphian movement), was raised up by God to restore the Truth to the earth, and was chosen by God because of his unique fitness to the task
- That God requires a sacrifice for "sinful nature", and that Christ therefore had to make a sacrifice both for his sinful nature and for the sinful nature of humanity
- That human nature is physically defiled by sin even before personal transgression has taken place
- That even without personal transgression, man is an abomination unto His Creator and has need for redemption through the shedding of blood
- That those who do not value the writings of the "Pioneers" (John Thomas and Robert Roberts, early Christadelphians who were influential in the formative years of the movement), are on their way back to "the apostasy"
- That the "Pioneers" should be the first reference for any interpretation of Scripture, and are authoritative in their interpretation of Scripture

Berean Christadelphians believe that true Christadelphians are those who agree with the beliefs of John Thomas and Robert Roberts (two early Christadelphians whose writings were influential in the formative years of the movement), and also believe that true Christadelphians are those who learn the gospel from the writings of these men rather than personal study of the Bible.

The Berean Christadelphians believe that the Bible should be interpreted according to the writings of these two early Christadelphians (to whom they refer as "the Pioneers"), and that all Scripture must be harmonized with the interpretations in these writings. Whilst denying that they believe either man was inspired, they state both men were raised up by God, and that John Thomas in particular was specifically chosen by God as being unique among men on the earth in his day.

== Other characteristics ==
Many Berean Christadelphians refer to John Thomas as 'Doctor Thomas' rather than 'Brother Thomas' (as male members of the Christadephians usually are). Please refer to online Berean Christadelphian archives for evidence of the Berean Christadelphian use of the phrase Brother Thomas, Bro. Thomas and other such references number in the thousands in the Berean Christadelphian magazine. Bereans doubt that the Bible alone is sufficient to teach the gospel, believing that the writings of either John Thomas or Robert Roberts are not only necessary but vital for a correct understanding of the Scriptures (considering the writings of John Thomas and Robert Roberts authoritative expositions of the Bible), and it is taught that neglect of the regular reading of these writings is 'to put our own salvation at risk!'. Bereans are typically suspicious of interpreting the Bible without the aid of the writings of John Thomas and Robert Roberts. The writings of John Thomas and Robert Roberts are considered authoritative expositions in the Berean fellowship, and Bereans will often quote them in discussion of Biblical issues instead of quoting the Bible.

Berean Christadelphians sometimes use a method of Biblical interpretation which is highly anagogical, with a heavy emphasis on typology and conjectural exposition. This is the method used commonly by early Christian expositors such as Origen and Augustine, and Berean Christadelphian exposition often resembles that of Origen in its appeal to analogue and typology. Whilst this method of exposition is also found in the main Christadelphian community, it does not predominate there as it does among the Berean Christadelphians Again, whilst in the main Christadelphian community it is used as a method of illustrating existing doctrines taught explicitly by the Bible, in the Berean Christadelphian fellowship it is frequently used as the foundation of doctrines not revealed explicitly in the Bible but which the Berean Christadelphians view as 'first principles', foundation doctrines which are necessary for salvation. Literal events described in the Bible are commonly declared to be typological of later events, and there is much speculation over the identity of the 'anti-type'. Discussions of this kind of exposition sometimes take place on online forums in a 'Mars Hill' format, in which conjectural exposition is proposed and encouraged.
