= Amended Christadelphians =

Christian denomination

The term Amended Christadelphians is a name given in North American publications to Christadelphian fellowships who adhere to the Birmingham Amended Statement of Faith (BASF).

== Use of the term ==
Both "Amended" and "Unamended" are prefixes exclusive to the United States and Canada, as the issue is localised there.

- The majority of Christadelphians within the US and Canada, and all Christadelphians outside of this area, are de facto Amended Christadelphians (although there are a number of fellowships that come under this umbrella name, ranging from the largest Christadelphian fellowship to some of the smallest).
- The Unamended community is confined to the US and Canada.

Usage of the term Amended Christadelphians has changed over the years since the words "Amended" and "Unamended" were first used, 1898–1908. Usage today also varies, among Christadelphians, according to the country and affiliation of the user. This change can be verified by noting references in the magazines of the community including The Christadelphian Tidings (Amended, North America), The Christadelphian Advocate (Unamended, North America), The Berean Ecclesial News (Berean, North America) and The Christadelphian (Britain)

=== (A). "Amended" indicating all non-Unamended Christadelphians ===
Historically, from 1898 the terms "Amended" and "Unamended" refer to the statements of faith used by each set of Christadelphians, one of which has been amended (and hence the prefix – "Amended" – added to that community of Christadelphians), and one has not been amended (and hence the prefix – "Unamended" – added to that community of Christadelphians). So technically all Christadelphians using a statement of faith containing the 1898 "Amendment" are de facto "Amended". This applies even to many UK ecclesias which never physically "amended" their statements but retain pre-1898 versions.

=== (B). "Amended" indicating North America members of the worldwide Central grouping ===
However, today the use of the term "Amended Christadelphians" is often restricted to identify the North American members of the worldwide "Central" grouping, in relation to Unamended Christadelphians.

In particular it is now unusual for the term "Amended" to be used of:

- Christadelphians outside North America (even though the vast majority of Christadelphians overseas, belong to the "Central" grouping which is in full communion with the North American "Amended" grouping)
- Minority fellowships inside North America, such as the Berean Christadelphians (even though they also have "Amendments" to their Statements, and therefore technically are "Amended").

== Difference in doctrine between Amended and Unamended Christadelphians ==
In contrast to some Unamended Christadelphians, the Amended groups believe that all who are responsible will be raised from the dead at the time of the Judgment when Jesus returns to the earth. The "responsible" are those who have been exposed to the Gospel. The righteous among the responsible ones will be judged according to their works, rewarded appropriately, and live forever. The wicked will be annihilated, and cease to exist. Those who are not responsible, since they had never heard the Gospel, will not be raised.

The Unamended group traditionally allows the teaching that only people who have been baptised are responsible, and it is only these who will be raised from the dead at the time of the Judgement when Jesus returns to the earth. The righteous among these people will be judged, rewarded appropriately, and live forever. The wicked among these people will be annihilated, and cease to exist. Those who are not responsible, since they had never been baptised, will not be raised.

However a significant number of Unamended Christadelphians do not allow this teaching, and have adopted various documents such as the "North American Statement of Unity" which are doctrinally consistent with the Amended position on teaching.

== Historical development ==
=== Foundation ===
The Amended community of the Christadelphian body shares the same initial history as all other fellowships within the Christadelphian brotherhood. For more information on this, see 'History: 2.1 History'.

=== Statement of Faith & Division of Christadelphian Fellowships ===
A major division occurred among the Christadelphians 1895–1899 on the issue of "resurrectional responsibility". The controversy caused serious disagreement concerning whether the Judgement at the return of Christ would be limited to baptised believers, or would also apply to anyone who had "heard" the Gospel message, but had rejected it – referred to as "enlightened rejectors".

Although the issue had already surfaced in Sydney in 1884, leading to excommunication of members there, and in London in 1887, when the issue surfaced on a much larger scale 1895–1897, the influential Birmingham Ecclesia, took the decision in January 1898 to amend Clause 24 of their Statement of Faith by inserting 18 words in brackets to clarify this. A minority in Leeds and London did not accept the amendment and a division in the UK followed led by Albert Hall and John Owler, and finding support from Thomas Williams (Christadelphian) of Chicago. The division spread to North America and was cemented in 1909 in Williams printed in Chicago a "Unamended Statement of Faith." with a few minor adjustments from the influential Birmingham Ecclesia's statement, but with the name "Birmingham" removed, and the offending amendment in Clause 24. Those in North America who associated on the basis of the unamended statement of faith became known as the Unamended Fellowship, and those who have associated on the basis of the amended statement become known, when in contrast to the Unamended Fellowship, as the Amended Christadelphians. There is still some disagreement today over what the original established beliefs of the Christadelphian community as a whole were prior to the controversy leading up to the division in 1898, with some members of each "fellowship" claiming that their current views were the original.

=== Reunion efforts ===
Most of the North American "Amended" ecclesias separated from the UK and Australian "Central" ecclesias from 1923–1952, as the Berean Christadelphians, but the majority of Bereans rejoined "Central" in 1952 following efforts by local brethren assisted by John Carter (Christadelphian) of The Christadelphian magazine. Further reunions (unrelated to the Amended/Unamended split in North America) occurred in Britain and Australia in 1957, bringing almost all Christadelphians together into one grouping for the first time since 1885. During the 1990s a serious effort was made to bring unity to North America with the North American Statement on Unity. Local efforts are ongoing.
