= Henry Sulley =

English architect and writer

Henry Sulley (1845–1940) was an English architect and writer on the temples of Jerusalem.

Sulley was born to English parents in Brooklyn, Long Island, USA, 30 January 1845, but relocated back to Nottingham when still young.

As an architect, Sulley is noted for several buildings in Nottingham, among them 2 Hamilton Road, 'a fine Victorian dwelling' designed for James White the lace manufacturer in 1883.

Although he had no formal training in archaeology, Sulley's background in architecture allowed him to develop various ideas about Solomon's Temple and the City of David. His primary area of activity was in writing concerning the temples in Jerusalem: Solomon's Temple, Herod's Temple and Ezekiel's Temple. In 1929 Sulley was the first to propose that the watercourse of Siloam tunnel was following a natural crack, a theory developed by Ruth Amiran (1968), and Dan Gill (1994).

Sulley had been baptised as a Christadelphian in October 1871 at the age of 26 following lectures by Robert Roberts and reading Elpis Israel. As a Christadelphian Sulley toured Australia, New Zealand, America and Canada, showing his large illustrated architectural designs for Ezekiel's temple, in lecture halls and museums, typically over two or three nights. These public lectures followed a regular pattern: archaeology, architecture, prophecy, and then preaching. On his journeys he would write articles for publication in England giving impressions on the buildings he saw: for example, noting that the Washington Monument was a marvel, but that the corner-towers of Ezekiel's temple would be two-and-a-half times taller. During the period from 1898 onwards he was a regular assistant to the second editor of The Christadelphian magazine, Charles Curwen Walker.

== Buildings ==
- Upnah House, 22 Balmoral Road, Nottingham 1873
- Malvern House, 41 Mapperley Road, Nottingham 1874
- 2 Hamilton Road, Nottingham 1873
- Oakfield, Cyprus Road, Mapperley Park, Nottingham 1882
- Elmsleigh, Hamilton Road, Mapperley Park, Nottingham 1883
- Addison Street Congregational Church 1884
- Warehouse, Peachey Street, Nottingham 1887-88 (Now YMCA)

== Publications ==
One of Henry Sulley's images of Ezekiel's Temple.

- Temple of Ezekiel's prophecy (1887)
- A Handbook to the Temple of Ezekiel's Prophecy
- Pentaletheia: Five writings on the Truth
- The Sign of the Coming of the Son of Man (1906)
- What is the Substance of Faith? A Reply to Sir Oliver Lodge (1908)
- Is It Armageddon? (1915; formerly Britain in prophecy)
- A House of Prayer for All People
- Where are our dead friends?
- Divine worship in the age to come
- Spiritism
