= Christendom Astray from the Bible =

Christendom Astray From the Bible (commonly: Christendom Astray) is a polemic work by the Christadelphian Robert Roberts that claims to demonstrate that the main doctrines shared by most Christian denominations are at variance with the teachings of the Bible. In the preface to the book the author states the rationale of Christendom Astray From the Bible as follows:

THE enlightened reader will bear with the seeming arrogance of the title. It is a proposition-not an invective. The question proposed for consideration is a question for critical investigation. Attention is invited to the evidence and the argument. They are strictly within the logical sphere. They can be examined and dismissed if found wanting. What the title affirms is that Christendom, the ostensible repository of revealed truth, is away from that truth.

— Robert Roberts, from the preface to Christendom Astray From the Bible (1884)

Christendom Astray covers topics such as The Bible—What it is, and how to interpret it (chapter 1), The Dead Unconscious till the Resurrection, and consequent error of popular belief in heaven and hell (chapter 3), The Devil not a personal supernatural being, but the scriptural personification of sin in its manifestations among men (chapter 7) and The Promises made to the Fathers (Abraham, Isaac, and Jacob), yet to be fulfilled in the setting up of the Kingdom of God upon earth (chapter 9).

The last section of the book is a summary of the preceding chapters comparing and contrasting, in table form, Roberts' understanding of the Bible against the beliefs of mainstream Christendom. This is followed by a brief introduction to the Christadelphian community, which Roberts claims are 'a body of people ... who hold the views advocated in this book of lectures'.

== History ==
The content of Christendom Astray was first delivered as a series of fortnightly lectures in Huddersfield in 1862. It was subsequently republished under the title of Twelve Lectures on the Teaching of the Bible. Additional chapters were added in subsequent reprints until the fifth edition, which was published as a cloth-bound book in 1869 with a total of seventeen chapters. Subsequent editions were simple reprints from the same plates. It was expanded to 18 chapters and republished as Christendom Astray From the Bible in 1884.

Minor changes were made in later editions. Following his debate with John James Andrew in 1894, Roberts revised two paragraphs in the 1899 edition which originally left open the possibility that unbaptised but responsible rejectors of the Gospel might not be raised and judged till the end of the millennium. In the 1951 edition published by The Christadelphian Office, chapter 16 entitled 'Evidence that the End is Near' was deleted because the start of the millennium age did not start as predicted by 1910. As the editor wrote, 'the suggested time of the Lord's appearing proved to be premature. Two world wars and worldwide changes could not go unnoticed in an adequate treatment of the subject, but this would have entailed an entire rewriting of the chapter'. '
