= Christadelphian Isolation League =

The Christadelphian Isolation League (CIL) is a registered charity which aims to look after the 'spiritual welfare' of baptised Christadelphians and their family members, who are distant from an ecclesia due to physical distance or illness. It is funded by donations from the Christadelphian community.

== Services ==
Exhortations, Bible studies and lectures in written form are mailed regularly to recipients in around 70 countries. In addition, the CIL organises a correspondence Sunday School and other youth activities, and publishes two magazines in braille containing articles of Scriptural interest. The CIL website hosts 2500 articles as well as 5000 audio and video recordings of Christadelphian meetings.
