= Leicestershire Law Society =

Law society in England's East Midlands

- Key people: Stephen Woolfe; James Coningsby; Helen Johnson; Wayne Hollingsworth; Duncan Jefferson
- Date founded: 1860
- Website: leicestershirelawsociety.org.uk

Leicestershire Law Society was formed in 1860 to support the legal profession in Leicestershire and Rutland. Today it has about 500 members who are solicitors practising in Leicester, Leicestershire and Rutland. This is a good majority of solicitors and their firms in the area and the information provided on this website is therefore representative of the local profession. The Society is separate from the Law Society of England and Wales which oversees the registration and professional conduct of solicitors.

== History ==
The Leicestershire Law Society was formed in 1860 and over the years since then it has evolved and adapted to reflect the needs of the legal profession in Leicester, Leicestershire and Rutland. The Society strives to represent the profession by fostering good relations with the local media and Members of Parliament. It also makes representations to these bodies on legal issues of the day which it thinks affect, or will affect the public's access to justice.

Leicestershire Law Society celebrated its 150th anniversary in March 2011.

== Annual firm of the year award ==
Each year Leicestershire Law Society awards the firm of the year to one of the law firms that operate in Leicestershire. In 2011 two firms were jointly awarded this prestigious award, Douglas Wemyss Solicitors and Edward, Hands & Lewis.

== See also ==
- Sheffield & District Law Society
