= Sheffield & District Law Society =

Sheffield & District Law Society is one of the United Kingdom's oldest and largest regional law societies. Founded in 1875 as The Sheffield District Incorporated Law Society, the organization dropped the word "incorporated" from its name in 2008. It is registered as a company limited by guarantee. The Society is based at Law Society Hall in Campo Lane, Sheffield, premises built with the assistance of a generous donation from local solicitor Edward Bramley in 1929.

== History ==
Among the Society's founder members were Nathaniel Creswick, who had also founded the world's first association football club, Sheffield F.C., 18 years earlier. Creswick was a solicitor who wrote the original rules of association football from his offices at 8 East Parade, Sheffield, premises still occupied by solicitors. Other notable former members of the Society include Sir Charles Clegg, who became the long-serving President and Chairman of the Football Association of England and Wales.

Today the Society aims to support the legal profession locally by offering training, social events, and a library and information service, and by representing the interests of those who register for membership. The Society also assists members of the public by helping them to find a suitable local solicitor, although the Society itself does not offer legal advice. It can also help to trace a solicitor or firm where there has been a change of name, merger or closure.

The current President of the Society is Mr Denney Lau, a Partner from VHS Fletchers Solicitors. The President is elected annually from among the solicitor members of the society.

The society produces a bi-monthly magazine called The Legal, which had a circulation of around 4,500 in 2014.

== Membership ==
Membership of the Society has traditionally been open to any solicitor practising within 25 miles of the Society's offices in Sheffield, but recent changes to its constitution mean that membership is open to all. Membership is available on an individual or corporate basis, and is also open to barristers and students.

== Annual dinner ==
The Society's annual dinner, held every year on the first Friday of February since 1876, is also known as the Yorkshire Law Banquet, and is one of the most prestigious events in the legal calendar. The dinner used to be held at the ancient Cutlers' Hall in Sheffield, however since 2021, the annual dinner was held at Royal Victoria Hotel and past speakers have included the Master of the Rolls Sir Anthony Clarke, the former Deputy Prime Minister Nick Clegg, the former Home Secretary David Blunkett and the well-known director of Liberty Shami Chakrabarti.

== See also ==
- Birmingham Law Society
- Leicestershire Law Society
