= John Carter (Christadelphian) =

Editor of The Christadelphian from 1937 to 1962

John Carter (1889–1962) was editor of The Christadelphian from 1937 to 1962.

Carter was the third editor of the Christadelphian after the founding editor Robert Roberts and his successor Charles Curwen Walker. He was the first editor of the magazine to be an employee of the Christadelphian Magazine and Publishing Association (CMPA), which Walker had established before his death to ensure a stable continuation. For most of the period 1937 to 1962 Carter worked to promote a broader range of content in the magazine, more outreach publications, and set in motion a series of New Testament Commentaries of which he himself wrote several volumes. In 1938 he was the representative of the church in front of military tribunals.

== The reunions ==
On its establishment by Walker, the magazine's association CMPA had initially been viewed with some suspicion by many Christadelphians who traditionally had been opposed to any body other than the independent local congregations. However, after the Second World War, and with the backing of the managing committee Carter increasingly put his energies into trying to heal the succession of divisions which had hampered the Christadelphian body since 1885, 1898 and 1923. Although Birmingham had in many ways been the heartland of the Christadelphian church's development in the 19th century, when Carter took over from Walker in 1937 the "Central" grouping, or Temperance Hall Fellowship accounted for only half of Christadelphians worldwide. In Birmingham itself many Christadelphians adhered to the "Suffolk Street" grouping of which Thomas Turner was editor of the Fraternal Visitor magazine. Although the position of editor carried no formal authority Carter was frequently invited to speak at Bible Schools in North America and Australia. He used these opportunities to encourage and support local efforts for unity. These reunions occurred in America (1952), Britain (1957) and Australia (1957) bringing 90% of Christadelphians into one group for the first time since 1885.

== Works ==
- The Letter to the Hebrews, Birmingham 1939
- The Gospel of John, 1943
- The Letter to the Ephesians, Birmingham 1944
- The Letter to the Romans, Birmingham 1944
- The Oracles of God, 1944
- Prophets After the Exile, 1945
- Parables of the Messiah, 1947
- God's Way, 1947
- The Letter to the Galatians, Birmingham 1949
- Marriage and Divorce, 1950
- Dare We Believe? (editor)
- Delight in God’s Law - articles 1964
- Speeches in the Acts, CSSS 2016 - adapted from transcripts of talks at Wilbraham, US 1952
- The Name of Salvation, A series of articles in The Christadelphian Magazine Sep 1958 - Mar 1959
