= Charles Curwen Walker =

English Christadelphian writer (1856–1940)

Charles Curwen Walker (1856–1940) was a Christadelphian writer and editor of The Christadelphian Magazine from 1898 to 1937.

== Biography ==
C.C. Walker was born near Diss, Depwade Rural District, Norfolk on February 18, 1856, son of a landowner. His middle name "Curwen" indicates his descent from the aristocratic Curwen family of Ewanrigg Hall, Dearham, Cumberland. At the age of 13 Charles Walker accompanied his father in emigration to Australia, where Walker subsequently worked as a surveyor at the goldfields of Ballarat.

In 1881 C.C. Walker returned to England to manage the sale of one of his father's properties and made a visit to childhood friends and relatives, the Sutcliffe family, in Haworth in West Yorkshire. The son of the family, Charles Sutcliffe, had been baptised as a Christadelphian at Keighley in August 1880. While Walker was staying with them Charles's sisters Ellen and Edith were also baptised. The Sutcliffes talked at length to Walker and gave him books to read on the long ocean voyage home to Australia, including Christendom Astray by Robert Roberts. Disembarking from the Aristides in Melbourne on 24 September 1881, he sought out the Christadelphians there before travelling home to Ballarat. The leading brother at the Windsor Ecclesia was Henry Gordon, an immigrant from Dominica, West Indies, and Walker requested baptism and informed him that a future wife would soon be sailing from England to join him. Early in September, 1881, Walker made a visit to Melbourne, and was baptised by Henry Gordon in the latter's home in Windsor.

In August 1882 sisters Ellen and Edith Sutcliffe of Haworth arrived in Melbourne, and Charles and Edith were married. The couple moved from Walker's parents home in Ballarat, to the Melbourne suburb of Prahan. Walker later set up a Christadelphian Book Centre in Melbourne, and sent an order for literature to Robert Roberts in Birmingham which was the largest single order the Christadelphian Office in Birmingham had ever received up to that time.

In 1887 the Walker family returned to the UK, via Palestine, partly at the urging of Robert Roberts to supervise the progress of funds Christadelphians were giving to the Laurence Oliphant's appeal for the Rosh Pinna Jewish settlement at Al-Ja'una. On his return Walker was soon authoring a monthly feature, "The Jews and Their Affairs", showing particular interest in the emergent movement for a Jewish homeland in Palestine. Walker visited Palestine three more times in 1901, 1902 and 1914 in the company of Frank Jannaway.

In 1898, following the death of Roberts, C.C. Walker took over the editorship of The Christadelphian magazine. He was the second, and last, editor to run the magazine as an individual, though he received support from several capable brethren including Henry Sulley. In 1934 he proposed to turn the magazine over to an association of nine brethren including W.H. Boulton as the Christadelphian Magazine and Publishing Association Ltd (CMPA), which in 1937 took over management and, on Walker's recommendation, employed John Carter as the new editor.

The period 1898-1937 was a difficult time for the Christadelphians (see history section in main article), and consequently for Walker as editor. He inherited from Roberts a controversy with John J. Andrew in London, which between 1898 and 1908 turned into a permanent breach, with a substantial part of the body in America separating as the Unamended Christadelphians led by Thomas Williams of Chicago. Although Walker had a gentle and moderate temperament, as often shown in his articles and editorials, he was unable to prevent a further separation of the influential Clapham meeting in South London, led by his former travelling companion to Palestine Frank Jannaway, and most of the remaining North American Christadelphians, into the Berean Christadelphians fellowship in 1923.

However, from 1923 the remaining "Central" Christadelphians had a time of relative peace and The Christadelphian Magazine continued to report growth in Britain and overseas. Also in mentoring John Carter to take over the position of editor Walker found someone who was able to contribute substantially to the reunions of almost all of the Christadelphian movement into one group in the 1950s. He died on April 3, 1940.

== Publications ==
- The Old Testament Doctrine of Eternal Life. A brief examination of many passages ... in which ... the doctrine of a future life 1906
- Job - An attempted “consideration” in the light of the later work of God in Christ. 1923
- Rome and the Christadelphians - Being a reply to “Christadelphianism” by J. W. Poynter, etc. 1923
- Theophany - the Bible doctrine of the manifestation of God upon earth in the angels, in the Lord Jesus Christ, and hereafter in "the manifestation of sons of God" 1929 reprint 1967.
- The Ministry of the Prophets: Jeremiah. His word and work in the divine guidance of the nation of Israel. 1935
- Witness for Christ. Selections from the writings of C. C. Walker. [With a portrait.] post. 1943
