= Meal-a-Day Fund =

Family of Christadelphian charities

The Christadelphian Meal-a-Day Fund (CMaD) is an international family of charities founded by the Christadelphians. Its stated intent is, as a practical witness to the Christadelphian faith, "to share the blessings we receive from God to help those who are in real need in the less developed parts of the world". It seeks to "support sustainable 'down to earth' projects that focus on supporting vulnerable children, the provision of clean water, agricultural skills, basic health care and education and a meal a day".

== Major projects ==
- Christadelphian School for Blind and Handicapped, Mbengwi, Cameroon: The school can admit up to 60 blind or disabled pupils and provides training in skills that help them to become self-supporting and to take up their place in society.
- The Nalondo CBM School for Physically Disabled, Western Province, Kenya was established in 1998 with 48 students. Classrooms, dormitories, kitchens and administration buildings were all built over the first few years. A water supply was provided and the school has some agricultural and animal projects to improve the children's diet and self-sufficiency. The school is recognised as a centre of excellence in the region. As of 2015, it consisted of an early child development (59 students), a primary school (211 students) and a secondary school (174 students).
- The Timboni Tiva Children's Home: Established in 1996 in an arid part of Kenya, east of Nairobi, the home cares for over 100 children. There is also a small nurse-led clinic on site which provides medical care to the nearby communities and provides out-reach health education.

== Other projects ==
Aside from the major, long term projects, the fund has made significant one-off donations to other causes, e.g., Tree Aid (which plants trees in Africa "to reduce poverty and protect the environment"), Village Water (providing wells and a programme of hygiene education to rural Zambian villages), WhizzKids United (an Africaid-run HIV/AIDS education programme using football to teach lessons about health) and others.

== History ==
The Christadelphian Meal-a-Day fund was founded in Tamworth, UK, in 1976. The name was inspired by a speech of Henry Kissinger's, in which he said everyone on earth should have at least one meal a day.

In 1999, representatives also started working in Australia to raise awareness and funding for projects in Nepal, Thailand, India, the Autonomous Region of Bougainville and Zambia. A revised, three-region structure was introduced in 2007, with aid for Europe, the Middle East and Africa being managed by the UK committee, aid for Asia-Pacific managed by an Australian committee, and that for North and Latin America and the Caribbean by a committee based in the United States and Canada.

== Fundraising ==
CMaD has a number fundraising channels, including donations from individuals, donations from church collections, legacies, sponsorship, and the sale of various items, such as greeting cards. In recent years, in the region of £750,000 per annum has been raised by CMaD UK, around 60% of which is currently used on long term projects that rely largely, or solely, on CMaD funding.
