= Bible Companion =

The Bible Companion is a Bible reading plan developed by Robert Roberts when he was 14 years of age, in about 1853, and revised by him over a number of years into its current format. It is widely used by Christadelphians, who place particular importance on personal daily Bible reading. Many Christadelphian congregations read one or more of the allotted chapters as part of their weekly Breaking of Bread service.

== Description ==
The plan starts on January 1 in the Book of Genesis, Book of Psalms and Gospel of Matthew and covers the whole Bible over the course of a year, at about four chapters a day. The Old Testament is read once and the New Testament twice. Here is an example of a section from the Bible Companion:

January
Date	Reading 1	Reading 2	Reading 3
1	Genesis 1, 2	Psalms 1, 2	Matthew 1, 2
2	3, 4	3-5	3, 4
3	5, 6	6-8	5
4	7, 8	9,10	6
5	9,10	11-13	7
6	11,12	14-16	8
7	13,14	17	9
8	15,16	18	10
9	17,18	19-21	11
10	19	22	12
11	20,21	23-25	13
12	22,23	26-28	14
13	24	29,30	15
14	25,26	31	16
15	27	32	17
16	28,29	33	18
17	30	34	19
18	31	35	20
19	32,33	36	21
20	34,35	37	22
21	36	38	23
22	37	39,40	24
23	38	41-43	25
24	39,40	44	26
25	41	45	27
26	42,43	46-48	28
27	44,45	49	Romans 1, 2
28	46,47	50	3, 4
29	48,50	51,52	5, 6
30	Exodus 1, 2	53-55	7, 8
31	3, 4	56,57	9

The Bible Companion is available on a number of apps.
