= Thomas Williams (Christadelphian) =

Welsh Christadelphian

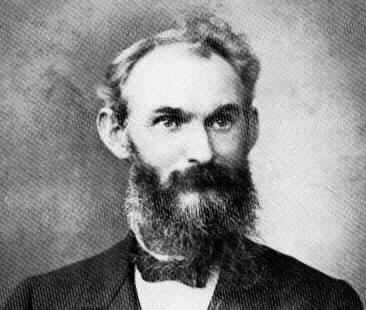
Thomas Williams

Thomas Williams (1847–1913) was a Welsh Christadelphian who emigrated to America in 1872, and eventually became editor of The Christadelphian Advocate magazine and author of The Great Salvation and The World's Redemption, reserving him a place alongside Christadelphian founders Dr. John Thomas and Robert Roberts. When his appeals to English brethren went unheeded, he became the most prominent of the brethren who avoided these divisive factions, and later became known as Unamended Christadelphians because they never adopted a particular amendment to the Christadelphian statement of faith.

== Life ==
Williams was born on April 7, probably in Parkmill, near Swansea. Having apprenticed as a carpenter in Parkmill, he then found work with a William Clement, later his father-in-law, a member of the Christadelphian Ecclesia in Mumbles, and was immersed on Sunday January 15, 1868. He married Elizabeth Clement and the couple had eight children - Clement, William, Katherine, in Wales, and Gershom, Fred, May, George and Bessie in America.

In 1872 he moved from Wales to Riverside, Iowa where he worked as a carpenter and joined the local "ecclesia" of 12 members In March 1885 he commenced publication of The Christadelphian Advocate Magazine at Waterloo, Iowa. In 1888 he met Robert Roberts in Wauconda, Illinois and again in Lanesville, Virginia for the first time since leaving Wales. In 1891 Williams began to publish a second magazine, The Truth Gleaner aimed at non-Christadelphians, and in 1892 relocated to Chicago. In 1893, in response to the expected visitors to Chicago for the World's Columbian Exposition, Williams published 10,000 copies of the booklet The Great Salvation. By 1972 105,000 copies had been published. In 1905 J.G. Miller of Waterloo, Iowa translated the booklet as Die grosse Erlösung.

Williams was also active traveling throughout North America as a preacher and Christadelphian speaker. As was typical of religious speakers of the period Williams participated in lengthy public debates with other religious groups.

== The 1898 division ==
In 1898 a controversy in London, England caused the Birmingham Central Ecclesia meeting at Temperance Hall to amend its statement of faith to include an extra bracketed sentence implying that God could and would raise at least some unbaptised believers at the resurrection. Although 10 members had already been "disfellowshipped" for not accepting this teaching in Sydney, Australia in 1883, and some British ecclesias already had similar amendments, the status of Birmingham as, then, in the words of sociologist Bryan R. Wilson, primus inter pares, led to an escalation which saw many ecclesias without similar amendments being isolated, particularly in areas directly affected by the controversy such as London.

See the history section of the article Christadelphians for background information.

Following the death of Robert Roberts in 1898 the role of editor of The Christadelphian Magazine in Britain was taken by Charles Curwen Walker. From May to August 1900 Williams visited Britain, meeting Walker and Henry Sulley in Birmingham and John James Andrew, in London. Walker was reluctant to speak as any kind of "representative" of the British Christadelphians, but strongly counseled Williams to support the amendment without regard for the peace of the original Christadelphian ecclesias in North America.

From October 1903 to June 1904 Williams visited Britain again at the invitation of Albert Hall of the Sowerby Bridge ecclesia in Yorkshire, and of John Owler of the Barnsbury Hall, Islington ecclesia in London. Hall and Owler had previously followed Andrew in the "resurrectional responsibility" controversy, although by 1903 Andrew himself would not fellowship with his previous supporters and reportedly been rebaptised in 1901. At a lecture in Leeds, which 40 visitors from those aligned with Birmingham Temperance Hall attended, Williams failed to state clearly that God could and would raise some unbaptised, and this was taken as supporting Andrew's teaching. However the next year Williams in print rejected Andrew's views as "extreme". Correspondence with Andrew continued till the latter's death in 1907. The result of the visit was a further distancing of the two sides.

In 1906 Williams held a public lecture in Toronto against the "Hell-fire" teaching of R. A. Torrey which drew an audience of 4,000, and was later published as a booklet "Hell Torments". Notes of an earlier debate in 1888 with the atheist Charles Watts led to publication of "The Divinity of the Bible" in 1906.

From June 1907 to August 1908 Williams made a third visit to England, leaving James Leask to run the magazine. In Wales he persuaded four ecclesias which were in fellowship with the "Fraternal Visitor" magazine of J.J. Hadley ("Suffolk Street") to avoid the extremes which characterized their brethren, but this only resulted in a third group which was rejected by both Birmingham Temperance Hall and Birmingham Suffolk St...

The process of division was unstoppable, and in November 1909 when Williams published an Unamended Statement of Faith, which was the old 1878 Birmingham Statement of Faith (BSF) with 7 minor changes, the new statement became known as the "BUSF" (though the 'B' for 'Birmingham' had in fact been dropped) and continued to be used by the Unamended Christadelphians.

In 1911 Williams relocated both home and magazine from Chicago to Orlando, Florida

In 1913 he made a fourth visit to Britain visiting Sowerby Bridge, Heckmondike, Leeds and Huddersfield in Yorkshire arranged by Hall, then London for meetings arranged by Owler. Heading back by train from London to Mumbles he collapsed and died on December 8, aged 66. After William's death his role of editor passed to A.H. Zilmer, formerly a Lutheran pastor, then a Church of God Abrahamic Faith minister, then as a Christadelphian the associate editor of The Faith magazine, which he resigned on taking up William's position. After two years he was replaced with John Owler, mentioned above. Some years later editorship also passed to Albert Hall, also mentioned above, who had emigrated to British Columbia.

== Works ==
- The Great Salvation. The Christadelphian Advocate, Chicago, 1893.
- The World's Redemption. The Christadelphian Advocate, Chicago, 1898.
- Man: His Origin, Nature and Destiny. The Christadelphian Advocate, Chicago, undated.
- The Devil - His Origin and End. The Christadelphian Advocate, Chicago, undated.
- Adamic Condemnation and the Responsibility Question. The Christadelphian Advocate, Chicago, undated.
- Rectification. The Christadelphian Advocate, Chicago, undated.
- Regeneration - What it is and how it is effected. The Christadelphian Advocate, Chicago, undated.
- Hell Torments - a failure, a fallacy and a fraud. The Christadelphian Advocate, Chicago, undated.

Biography and selected works:

- The Christadelphian Advocate Committee: Life and Works of Bro. Thomas Williams The Christadelphian Advocate, 1974.
