= Birmingham Law Society =

The Birmingham Law Society is a professional association of solicitors, barristers and legal executives based in Birmingham, West Midlands. It is the oldest such organisation in England and Wales, and the largest except for the national Law Society of England and Wales.

== History ==
The society was founded on 3 January 1818 at a meeting in the Royal Hotel in Temple Row. Birmingham at that time had no courts of its own and the society initially had 19 members out of a total of 54 lawyers practising in the town.

The society took over the Birmingham Law Library, then based in Waterloo Street, in 1832. In 1934 both society and library relocated to a former temperance hall on Temple Street designed by architect Charles Bateman in 1933. In 2008 Birmingham Law Society transferred its library to Aston University and in 2009 it moved out of the Temple Street premises.

Today the society is a modern, dynamic organisation. During 2011 its membership increase by around 1,000 lawyers (40% increase) taking overall membership to over 3,500 lawyers from all over the West Midlands. The society was the first in the country to welcome barristers as members and now has almost 500 barristers within its membership. It is by far the largest local law society in England and Wales and has 45 lawyers sitting on the society's council with over 100 lawyers involved with the society's various committees. .

== See also ==
- Sheffield & District Law Society
