= Elpis Israel =

1849 book by John Thomas

Elpis Israel - An Exposition of the Kingdom of God (commonly called Elpis Israel) is a theological book written by John Thomas, founder of the Christadelphians, and published in 1849.

The title is an English transliteration of Greek for "the hope of Israel", taken from Acts 28:20. The book was based on a series of lectures given by Thomas in 1848 and consists of three parts, The Rudiments Of The World, The Things Of The Kingdom Of God And Of Jesus Christ and The Kingdoms Of The World In Their Relation To The Kingdom Of God. Thomas did not see, nor do the Christadelphians see, the book as inspired by God, but rather a deep and accurate study of The Bible. It is nevertheless widely read amongst Christadelphian believers and whilst not being the foundation for, does contains some of their core beliefs.

Four editions were published during the author’s lifetime. Subsequent editions were published by the Christadelphian Magazine & Publishing Association, the latest being the 15th edition (2000). The fourth edition has been reprinted by Logos Publications.

Audio versions are also available.
