= Robert Roberts (Christadelphian) =

British Christadelphian author and editor (1839–1898)

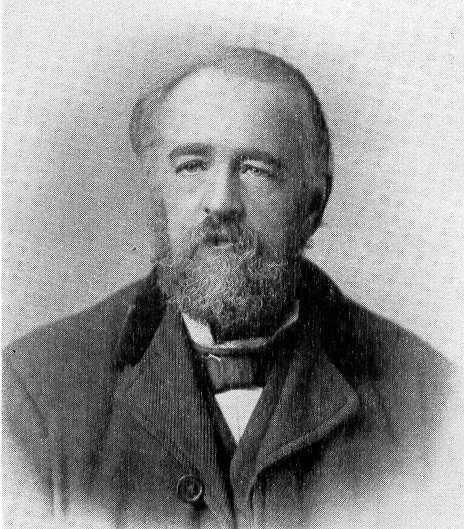
Robert Roberts

Robert Roberts (April 8, 1839 – September 23, 1898) is the man generally considered to have continued the work of organising and establishing the Christadelphian movement founded by Dr. John Thomas. He was a prolific author and the editor of The Christadelphian magazine from 1864 to 1898.

== Early life ==
Robert Roberts, born in Link Street, Aberdeen, Scotland, was the son of a captain of a small coasting vessel. His grandmother on his father's side was of the Clan MacBeth. His mother was a strongly religious Calvinistic Baptist, schoolteacher, and daughter of a London merchant. Though his family were of lowly circumstances, he was raised in a well disciplined and strictly religious environment. Leaving school at the age of 11, he worked a short while as clerk in a rope factory, then serving in a grocers shop, and thirdly as a sort of apprentice to a lithographer. At 13 he became an apprentice to a druggist, also taking lessons in Latin, and learning Pitman's Shorthand. His mother took him as a boy of 10 to hear John Thomas speak in Aberdeen, Scotland. He briefly became a member of his mother's church when aged 12. Shortly afterward he came across a copy of a magazine, belonging to his sister, entitled the Herald of the Kingdom and Age to Come, by Thomas, who knew Roberts' mother. Robert Roberts then began his Bible studies in earnest. After reading Thomas' book Elpis Israel, with Bible in hand, he became convinced of its soundness, and ceased attending chapel with his family. He was baptised in 1853 aged 14 as part of the "Baptised Believers" (this was 11 years before the name 'Christadelphian' was coined by John Thomas; he was re-baptized in 1863 "on attaining to an understanding of the things concerning the name of Jesus, of which he was ignorant at his first immersion").

He developed a reading plan to facilitate his daily systematic reading of the Scriptures. A form of this plan was later published as The Bible Companion and continues to be used by many Christadelphians. He married Jane Norrie in Edinburgh on April 8, 1859. They had six children, only three of whom survived into adulthood.

== Shorthand writer and reporter ==
When Robert Roberts was 17 he became shorthand writer for a modest paper, the Aberdeen Daily Telegraph, after which he worked as a casual reporter, once being called on to assist in reporting the speeches delivered at an investigation into the merits of the Suez Canal scheme, conducted by Aberdeen Town Council on the occasion of a visit by Ferdinand de Lesseps. He left Aberdeen for Edinburgh to work as a reporter on The Caledonian Mercury. Leaving Edinburgh 1858, he worked for The Examiner in Huddersfield, then briefly for the same employer in Dewsbury. Then he accepted a travelling assignment as shorthand writer for the American phrenologists, Orson Squire Fowler and Samuel R. Wells, who were visiting Huddersfield as part of a lecturing tour (Roberts later described phrenology as of similarly high value to his religious beliefs). He returned to his job on the Huddersfield Examiner in July 1861. During his time at The Examiner he was also appointed as the Huddersfield correspondent for the Leeds Mercury, the Halifax Courier, and the Manchester Examiner. In the winter of 1863–64, Roberts moved to Birmingham, but failed in his attempt to set up a general reporting and advertising agency there. In 1864 he became a reporter for the Birmingham Daily Post, largely as a result of a testimonial from John Bright MP. In July 1865, he became a shorthand writer for the Birmingham Bankruptcy Court, working there until 1870, when a change in the Bankruptcy Act 1869 brought an end to his appointment. Then, at the suggestion of Thomas, it was arranged that he should receive a salary for his editorship of The Christadelphian magazine, and so his career as a reporter came to an end.

== Association with John Thomas ==
It was 1856 when Robert Roberts first wrote to John Thomas in America. In 1858 he tried, but failed, to raise funds for travelling expenses to invite Thomas to visit England again; receiving a reply concerning his efforts through the pages of The Herald of The Kingdom. During the American Civil War Thomas had to suspend publication of The Herald of The Kingdom magazine. Thus on October 8, 1861 Robert Roberts wrote to Thomas urging him to visit, which he did in 1862. Shorthand notes taken by Roberts during this visit formed the basis of Roberts' book Dr John Thomas: his life and work (published in 1873 – two years after Thomas' death). Some time after this visit, due in part to misunderstandings and misinformation, there was a short breach of friendly relations between the two men; this was resolved in October 1864. Subsequently, they enthusiastically supported each other's work. Roberts collected subscriptions and organised the distribution of John Thomas' exposition of the Book of Revelation, Eureka (3 vols. 1861, 1866, 1868), in England, and (in time) many of his other works. Roberts raised the money to fund what would be the last trip of Thomas to England in May 1869. Toward the end of this trip, March 1870, Thomas made Roberts custodian of all his affairs in the event of his death, which occurred sooner than anticipated in 1871. Roberts died in 1898, and was buried in Green-Wood Cemetery, New York City, beside the grave of Thomas.

== Preaching ==
Even in his early days Roberts endeavoured to organise preaching events wherever he went. His first serious attempt was in 1860, when he delivered a course of 8 public lectures in Senior's School Room, East Parade, Huddersfield. The Huddersfield meeting then took on Spring Street Academy, (a former Campbellite meeting place) for Sunday meetings including public lectures. Some Sunday afternoons he would also give out-of-door addresses, either in St. George's Square or the Market Place, Huddersfield. It was at Spring Street, in the winter of 1861, that Robert Roberts delivered a series of twelve Lectures on successive Sunday afternoons, systematically setting out Christadelphian beliefs.

In 1864 after moving to Birmingham, he organised a lecture at Birmingham Town Hall, in reply to an Irvingite preacher who had spoken there previously. Between 1,500 and 1,800 people attended. Eventually in 1866 he leased the Athenaeum Chambers, 71 Temple Row, Birmingham, staying there until December 1871 when the meeting moved to the Temperance hall, 8 Temple Street, Birmingham. Although based in Birmingham, he travelled widely around the country, preaching and supporting the growing Christadelphian movement.

Roberts used all the means at his disposal to preach what he believed to be the truth, and in 1877 he sent a copies of his pamphlet Prophecy and the Eastern Question to all the members of the House of Lords and the House of Commons, receiving the following reply from Gladstone: “DUNSTER, January 24th, 1877. Sir, Allow me to thank you for your tract, which I shall read with great interest; for I have been struck with the apparent ground for belief that the state of the East may be treated of in that field where you have been labouring Your faithful servant, W.E.Gladstone.”

In 1895 he embarked (through pressure of circumstances) upon a voyage to Australia. He travelled via the Suez canal, touching at Naples and Colombo to Adelaide. He visited many towns and cities, in Australia and New Zealand, preaching everywhere he went. He then travelled back via the Fiji Islands, Honolulu (on what then still known as the Sandwich Islands), Canada and America arriving back in Birmingham in 1896. In 1897 he returned to Australia with his family, they settled in Coburg, a northern suburb of Melbourne, in “Orient House”. In 1897-1898 he went on a short preaching tour in Australia, before embarking on a yet another preaching tour to New Zealand with his wife.

He was in the midst of yet more travelling and preaching when he died of heart failure in San Francisco in September 1898 aged 59. He was succeeded as editor of The Christadelphian Magazine by Charles Curwen Walker.

== Writer and editor ==
Robert Roberts, as early as 1858, attempted to start a manuscript magazine – just a single copy sent from friend to friend through the post. It did not get beyond the 4th or 5th number. In 1862 John Thomas, having suspended publication of the Herald of the Kingdom, advised Roberts to start a magazine. It is at this point that Robert's re-baptism (mentioned above) occurred, midway between the first edition of 12 lectures (1861), and preceding in July 1864 commencement of the publication of The Ambassador of the Coming Age. Thomas, out of concern that someone else might start a publication and call it The Christadelphian, urged Robert Roberts to change the name of his magazine to The Christadelphian, which he did in 1869. His editorship of the magazine continued with some assistance until his death in 1898. Roberts collected for the Rosh Pinna settlement in Israel in 1886 and later, but lost significant funds in the failure of the American Electric Sugar Refining Company in 1888.

Roberts wrote and published numerous articles, pamphlets and books. A series of 12 lectures, given in Huddersfield in 1861, formed the basis of his first book. Each lecture was published sequentially at fortnightly intervals, in penny numbers. The second edition (February 1862), entitled Twelve Lectures, was stitched together in one volume. Expanded to 18 lectures, the book was republished by Robert Roberts in 1884, as Christendom Astray From the Bible. From its first publication as 12 lectures, Christendom Astray was acknowledged by Christadelphians as a standard work putting forth their beliefs; it has now been in print for almost 146 years in several editions. In 1867, from the manuscript of R.C. Bingley of Chicago, he published The Declaration, a standard work used for many years.

He was involved in many public religious debates (a feature of the age in which he lived) with those of differing opinions, often publishing the substance of the debate in book or pamphlet form;

- Was Jesus of Nazareth The Messiah? 1871. Transcript of debate with Louis Stern of the Anti-Jewish Conversionist Society, Birmingham. This debate marks the beginnings of mutually respectful relations with Birmingham's Jewish community, which continued in the 1880s when Roberts called on the Christadelphian community to support Laurence Oliphant's appeal for funds for the Rosh Pinna settlement at Al-Ja'una in Galilee.
- In 1872 Roberts published the book Man Mortal as a reply to the book “Life and Immortality” (1871) by Frederick William Grant of the Plymouth Brethren.
- The Bradlaugh Debate, a public debate held in 1876 with Charles Bradlaugh entitled “Is The Bible Divine?”.
- Anglo-Israelism Refuted, based on a three night debate with the advocate of British Israelism, Edward Hine, held on April 21–23, 1879 at Exeter Hall, London, with Lord William Lennox presiding.

Roberts was also involved in debates within the Christadelphian movement, which in some cases resulted in divisions. For example, 1865 marked separation from George Dowie of Edinburgh who was teaching the doctrine of the existence of a supernatural devil. Roberts' brother-in-law, William Norrie, initially sided with Dowie, but Dowie's group did not long survive his death. As an "Arranging Brother" of Birmingham Temperance Hall Ecclesia he was directly involved in the compilation of the Birmingham Statement of Faith (1877), and by letter from overseas agreed with minor amendation to the Birmingham Amended Statement of Faith in 1898.

== Voyage to Australia and New Zealand ==
To quote his own words, "through stress of circumstances" Roberts undertook, at the expense of his friends there, a voyage to "visit the Colonies... for the more complete restoration of health." Throughout his voyage in 1895–6, Roberts kept a (subsequently published) diary of his experiences and observations, in which he made sure to "put all in" and "resist the feeling that things are unimportant for record".

== Bibliography ==
=== Books ===
- Christendom Astray From the Bible (1884)
- Dr Thomas: His Life and Works (1873)
- The Law of Moses
- My Days and My Ways
- Nazareth Revisited (1890)
- Seasons of Comfort (1879)
- Thirteen Lectures on the Apocalypse (1880)
- To the Elect of God in Times of Trouble
- The Truth about God and the Bible
- The Visible Hand of God
- The Ways of Providence (1881)
- The Trial (1882)
- Diary of a Voyage to Australia, New Zealand, and Other Lands (1896)

=== Booklets ===
- The Blood of Christ (1895)
- The Christadelphian Instructor (1891)
- The Commandments of Christ
- The Ecclesial Guide (1883)
- The Good Confession (1869)
- The Parables of Christ
- The Sect Everywhere Spoken Against (reprint of a lecture)
- The Slain Lamb (1873)
- Was Jesus of Nazareth The Messiah? (The Stern debate; 1871)
- Everlasting Punishment not 'Eternal Torments' (1871)

=== Magazines ===
- The Christadelphian

== Bibliography ==
- Roberts, Robert, My Days and My Ways An Autobiography (Birmingham: The Christadelphian, 1894)
- Walker, Charles C., Robert Roberts His Ways and His Days (Birmingham: The Christadelphian)
- Collyer, Islip, Robert Roberts A Study of Life and Character, (Birmingham: The Christadelphian, 1917, Hyderabad, India 2003 176 pages)
- Thomas, John ed. The Herald of the Kingdom (America:1858)
- The Christadelphian Magazines 1864-1940
