= The Christadelphian =

British Bible magazine

The cover of the May 2015 edition

The Christadelphian is a Bible magazine published monthly by the Christadelphian Magazine and Publishing Association (CMPA) of Hall Green, Birmingham, England. It states that it is "A magazine dedicated wholly to the hope of Israel" and, according to the magazine website, it "reflects the teachings, beliefs and activities of the Christadelphians".

== History ==
The magazine was founded in 1864 as The Ambassador of the Coming Age under the editorship of Robert Roberts. The name was changed to The Christadelphian in 1869. Subsequent editors include C.C. Walker (editor from 1898–1937), John Carter (1937–1962), Louis Sargent, Alfred Nicholls, Michael Ashton, Andrew Bramhill and presently Mark Vincent.

== Content ==
The magazine contains a wide variety of articles, including exhortations from Breaking of Bread services, studies of Biblical characters, articles on Christian living, reviews of Bible-related books, and comment on relevant current events in relation to Bible prophecy. Items for publication are produced by potentially any Christadelphian, pending the editorial process. There is also a section dedicated to Christadelphian events and news from congregations, such as notifications of baptisms and deaths.

== Other publications ==
All issues and books published by the CMPA are available on their Digital Library, together with works by other publishers, such as The Testimony, which has now merged with the CMPA. In addition to the magazine, other literature is published by the CMPA, including printed and electronic books, booklets detailing various Christadelphians beliefs, and Faith Alive, a magazine aimed at 16–25 year olds, which has been published since 1978.
