= Christadelphians =

Restorationist nontrinitarian Christian denomination

The Christadelphians (/ˌkrɪstəˈdɛlfiənz/) are a restorationist and Unitarian Christian denomination. The name means 'brothers in Christ', from the Greek words for Christ (Christos) and brothers (adelphoi).

Christadelphians believe in the inspiration of the Bible, the Virgin Birth, the status of Jesus as the son of God, believer's baptism, the resurrection of the dead, the second coming of Christ, and the future kingdom of God on earth. However, they reject a number of mainstream Christian doctrines, for example the Trinity and the immortality of the soul, believing these to be corruptions of original Christian teaching.

The movement developed in the United Kingdom and North America in the 19th century around the teachings of John Thomas and they were initially found predominantly in the developed English-speaking world, expanding in developing countries after the Second World War. In 2009, the BBC estimated there were approximately 50,000 Christadelphians in around 120 countries. In 2020, Peter Hemingray estimated that there was a total of 57,600 Christadelphians. Congregations are traditionally referred to as "ecclesias".

== History ==
=== 19th century ===
The Christadelphian movement traces its origins to John Thomas (1805–1871). He initially associated with emerging Restoration Movement in the United States but later separated from them. The Christadelphian community in the United Kingdom effectively dates from Thomas's first lecturing tour of Britain (May 1848 – October 1850). During this period, he wrote Elpis Israel in which he laid out his understanding of the main doctrines of the Bible. Since his medium for bringing change was print and debate, it was natural for the origins of the Christadelphian body to be associated with books and journals, such as Thomas's Herald of the Kingdom. His message was particularly welcomed in Scotland, and Campbellite, Unitarian and Adventist friends separated to form groups of "Baptised Believers".

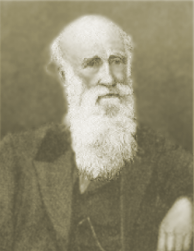
John Thomas

He was not alone in his desire to establish Biblical truth and test orthodox Christian beliefs through independent scriptural study. Among other churches, he had links with the Adventist movement and with Benjamin Wilson (who later set up the Church of God of the Abrahamic Faith in the 1860s). Although the Christadelphian movement originated through the activities of John Thomas, he never saw himself as making his own disciples. He believed rather that he had rediscovered 1st-century beliefs from the Bible alone, and sought to prove that through a process of challenge and debate and writing journals. Through that process a number of people became convinced and set up various fellowships that had sympathy with that position. Groups associated with John Thomas met under multiple names, including Believers, Baptised Believers, the Royal Association of Believers, Baptised Believers in the Kingdom of God, Nazarines (or Nazarenes), and The Antipas until the time of the American Civil War (1861–1865). At that time, church affiliation was required in the United States and the Confederate States of America in order to register for conscientious objector status, and in 1864, Thomas chose for registration purposes the name Christadelphian.

Through the teaching of John Thomas and the need in the American Civil War for a name, the Christadelphians emerged as a denomination, but they were formed into a lasting structure through a passionate follower of Thomas's interpretation of the Bible, Robert Roberts. In 1864, he began to publish The Ambassador of the Coming Age magazine. John Thomas, out of concern that someone else might start a publication and call it The Christadelphian, urged Robert Roberts to change the name of his magazine to The Christadelphian, which he did in 1869. His editorship of the magazine continued with some assistance until his death in 1898. In church matters, Roberts was prominent in the period following the death of John Thomas in 1871 and helped craft the structures of the Christadelphian body.

Initially, the denomination grew in the English-speaking world, particularly in the English Midlands and parts of North America. Two-thirds of ecclesias and members in Britain before 1864 were in Scotland. In the early days after the death of John Thomas, the group could have moved in a number of directions. Doctrinal issues arose, debates took place, and statements of faith were created and amended as other issues arose. These attempts were felt necessary by many to both settle and define a doctrinal stance for the newly emerging denomination and to keep out error. As a result of these debates, several groups separated from the main body of Christadelphians, most notably the Suffolk Street fellowship in 1885 (with members believing that the whole of the Bible was not inspired) and the Unamended fellowship.

=== 20th century ===
The Christadelphian position on conscientious objection came to the fore with the introduction of conscription during the First World War. Varying degrees of exemption from military service were granted to Christadelphians in the United Kingdom, Canada, Australia, New Zealand, and the United States. In the Second World War, this frequently required the person seeking exemption to undertake civilian work under the direction of the authorities.

During the Second World War, the Christadelphians in Britain assisted in the Kindertransport, helping to relocate several hundred Jewish children away from Nazi persecution by founding a hostel, Elpis Lodge, for that purpose. In Germany, the small Christadelphian community founded by Albert Maier went underground from 1940 to 1945, and a leading brother, Albert Merz, was imprisoned as a conscientious objector and later executed.

After the Second World War, moves were made to try to reunite various earlier divisions. By the end of the 1950s, most Christadelphians had united into one community, but a number of small groups remained separate.

=== Today ===
The post-war and post-reunions periods saw an increase in co-operation and interaction between ecclesias, resulting in the establishment of a number of week-long Bible schools and the formation of national and international organisations such as the Christadelphian Bible Mission (for preaching and pastoral support overseas), the Christadelphian Support Network (for counselling), and the Christadelphian Meal-A-Day Fund (for charity and humanitarian work).

The period following the reunions was accompanied by expansion in the developing world, which now accounts for around 40% of Christadelphians.

== Beliefs ==
The Christadelphian body has no central authority or co-ordinating organisation to establish and maintain a standardised set of beliefs, but there are core doctrines accepted by most Christadelphians. In the formal statements of faith a more complete list is found; for instance, the Birmingham Amended Statement of Faith has 30 doctrines to be accepted and 35 to be rejected.

=== The Bible ===
Christadelphians state that their beliefs are based wholly on the Bible, and they do not see other works as inspired by God. They regard the Bible as inspired by God and, therefore, believe that in its original form, it is error-free apart from errors in later copies due to errors of transcription or translation.

=== God ===
Christadelphians believe that God, Yahweh, (Note: While the name "Jehovah" has some usage amongst Christadelphians and is suitable in this article due to its interdenominational familiarity, many Christadelphians exclusively use the name "Yahweh" when referring to the name of God represented by the Tetragrammaton "YHWH".) is the creator of all things and the father of true believers, and that he is a separate being from his son, Jesus (who is subordinate to him). They reject the doctrine of the Trinity.

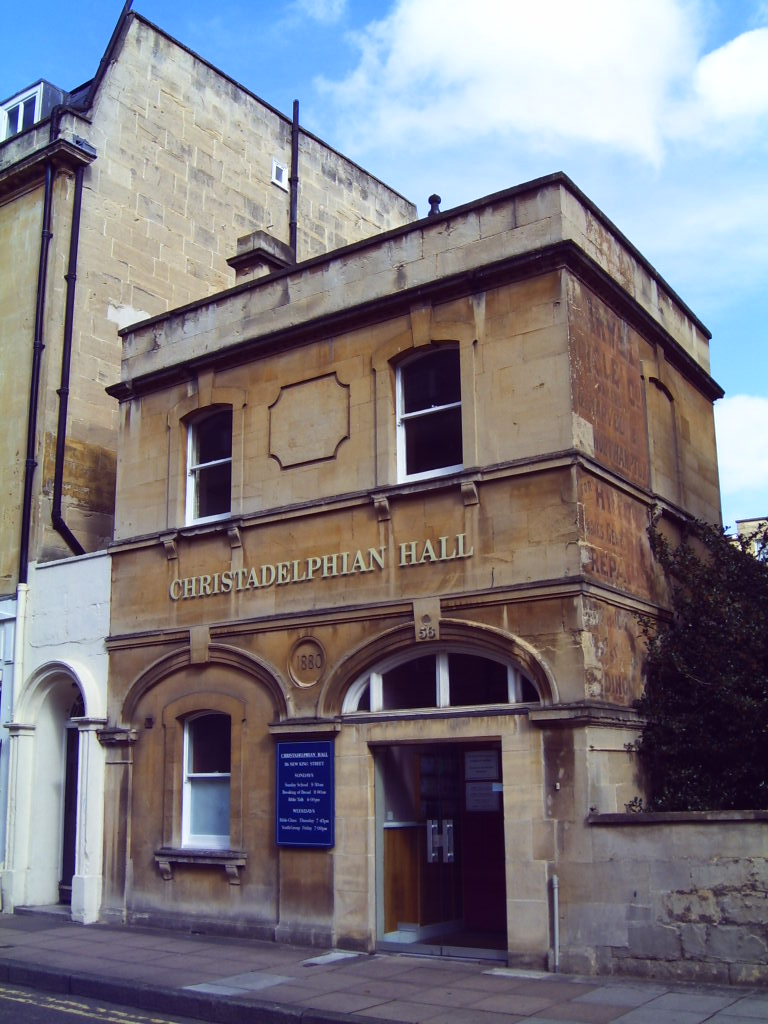
Christadelphian Hall in Bath, United Kingdom

=== Jesus ===
Christadelphians believe that Jesus was the promised Jewish Messiah in whom the prophecies and promises of the Old Testament (Hebrew Bible) find their fulfilment. They believe he is the Son of Man—in that he inherited human nature (with its inclination to sin) from his mother—and the Son of God by virtue of his miraculous conception by the power of God. Christadelphians reject the doctrine of the pre-existence of Christ. They teach that he was part of God's plans from the beginning and was foreshadowed in the Old Testament, but was not an independent being prior to his human birth. The faith posits that, though he was tempted, Jesus committed no sin, and was, therefore, a perfect representative sacrifice to bring salvation to sinful humankind. They believe that God raised Jesus from death and gave him immortality, and he has ascended to Heaven, God's dwelling place, until he returns to set up the Kingdom of God on earth.

=== The Holy Spirit ===
Christadelphians believe that the Holy Spirit is the power of God used in creation and for salvation. They also believe that the phrase Holy Spirit sometimes refers to God's character/mind, depending on the context in which the phrase appears, but reject the view that people need strength, guidance and power from the Holy Spirit to live a Christian life, believing instead that the spirit a believer needs within themselves is the mind/character of God, which is developed in a believer by their reading of the Bible (which, they believe, contains words God gave by his Spirit) and trying to live by what it says during the events of their lives which God uses to help shape their character. Christadelphians deny the personhood of the Holy Spirit and the present-day possession of the Holy Spirit (both "gift of" and "gifts of") (see cessationism).

=== The Kingdom of God ===
Christadelphians believe that Jesus will return to the Earth in person to set up the Kingdom of God in fulfilment of the promises made to Abraham and David. This includes the belief that the coming Kingdom will be the restoration of God's first Kingdom of Israel, which was under David and Solomon. For Christadelphians, this is the focal point of the gospel taught by Jesus and the Twelve Apostles. They believe that the Kingdom will be centred upon Israel, but Jesus will also reign over all the other nations on the Earth. Old Paths Christadelphians continue to believe that the Kingdom of God is to be restored to the land of Israel promised to Abraham and ruled over in the past by David, with a worldwide empire.

=== The Devil ===
Christadelphians believe that the word devil is a reference in the scriptures to sin and human nature in opposition to God, while the word satan is merely a reference to an adversary or opponent (be it good or bad) and is frequently applied to human beings. According to Christadelphians, these terms are used in reference to specific political systems or individuals in opposition or conflict and not to an independent spiritual being or fallen angel. Accordingly, they do not define Hell as a place of eternal torment for sinners, but as a state of eternal death and non-existence due to annihilation of body and mind.

=== Salvation ===
Christadelphians believe that people are separated from God because of their sins but that humankind can be reconciled to him by becoming disciples of Jesus. This is by belief in the Gospel, through repentance, and through baptism by total immersion in water. They reject assurance of salvation, believing instead that salvation comes as a result of remaining "in Christ". After death, believers are in a state of non-existence, knowing nothing until the Resurrection at the return of Jesus. Following the judgement, the "accepted" receive the gift of immortality and live with Jesus on a restored Earth, assisting his establishment of the Kingdom of God and rule over the remaining population for a millennium. Christadelphians deny the immortality of the soul.

=== Life in Christ ===
The Commandments of Christ demonstrates the community's recognition of the importance of biblical teaching on morality. Marriage and family life are important. Most Christadelphians believe that sexual relationships should be limited to heterosexual marriage, ideally between baptised believers.

== Organisation ==
=== General organisation ===
In the absence of centralised organisation, some differences exist amongst Christadelphians on matters of belief and practice. This is because each congregation (commonly styled 'ecclesias') is organised autonomously, typically following common practices which have altered little since the 19th century. Many avoid the word "church" due to its association with mainstream Christianity, and its focus on the building as opposed to the congregation. Most ecclesias have a constitution, which includes a 'Statement of Faith', a list of 'Doctrines to be Rejected' and a formalised list of 'The Commandments of Christ'. The statement of faith acts as the official standard of most ecclesias to determine fellowship within and between ecclesias, and as the basis for co-operation between ecclesias. Congregational discipline and conflict resolution are applied using various forms of consultation, mediation, and discussion, with disfellowship (similar to excommunication) being the final response to those with unorthodox practices or beliefs.

One influence on Christadelphian organizational practices is the booklet called A Guide to the Formation and Conduct of Christadelphian Ecclesias, written early in Christadelphian history by Robert Roberts. It recommends an arrangement by which congregational members elect 'brothers' to do arranging and serving duties, and includes guidelines for the organisation of committees, as well as conflict resolution between congregational members and between congregations. Christadelphians do not have paid ministers. Male members are assessed by the congregation for their eligibility to teach and perform other duties, which are usually assigned on a rotation basis, as opposed to having a permanently appointed preacher. Congregational polity typically follows a democratic model, with an elected arranging committee for each individual ecclesia. This unpaid committee is responsible for the day-to-day running of the ecclesia and is answerable to the rest of the ecclesia's members.

Inter-ecclesial organisations co-ordinate the running of, among other things, Christadelphian schools and elderly care homes, the Christadelphian Isolation League (which cares for those prevented by distance or infirmity from attending an ecclesia regularly) and the publication of Christadelphian magazines.

=== Adherents ===
No official membership figures are published, but the Columbia Encyclopaedia gives an estimated figure of 50,000 Christadelphians, spread across approximately 120 countries. Estimates for the main centers of Christadelphian population are as follows: Mozambique (17,800), Australia (9,734), the United Kingdom (8,200), Malawi (7,000), United States (6,500), Canada (3,000), Kenya (2,700), India (2,300) and New Zealand (1,785). Figures from Christadelphian mission organisations are as follows: Africa (32,500), Asia (4,000), the Caribbean (400), Europe (including Russia) (700), Latin America (275), and the Pacific (200).

=== Fellowships ===
The Christadelphian body consists of a number of fellowships – groups of ecclesias which associate with one another, often to the exclusion of ecclesias outside their group. They are to some degree localised. The Unamended Fellowship, for example, exists only in North America. Christadelphian fellowships have often been named after ecclesias or magazines who took a lead in developing a particular stance.

The majority of Christadelphians today belong to what is commonly known as the Central Fellowship. The term "Central" came into use around 1933 to identify ecclesias worldwide who were in fellowship with the Birmingham (Central) Ecclesia. These were previously known as the "Temperance Hall Fellowship". The "Suffolk Street Fellowship" arose in 1885 over disagreements surrounding the inspiration of the Bible. Meanwhile, in Australia, division concerning the nature of Jesus Christ resulted in the formation of the "Shield Fellowship". Discussions in 1957–1958 resulted in a worldwide reunion between the Central, Suffolk Street and Shield Fellowships.

The Unamended Fellowship, consisting of around 1,850 members, is found in the East Coast and Midwest USA and Ontario, Canada. This group separated in 1898 as a result of differing views on who would be raised to judgement at the return of Christ. The majority of Christadelphians believe that the judgement will include anyone who had sufficient knowledge of the gospel message, and is not limited to baptised believers. The majority in England, Australia and North America amended their statement of faith accordingly. Those who opposed the amendment became known as the "Unamended Fellowship" and allowed the teaching that God either could not or would not raise those who had no covenant relationship with him. Opinions vary as to what the established position was on this subject prior to the controversy. Prominent in the formation of the Unamended Fellowship was Thomas Williams, editor of the Christadelphian Advocate magazine. The majority of the Unamended Fellowship outside North America joined the Suffolk Street Fellowship before its eventual incorporation into Central Fellowship. There is also some co-operation between the Central (Amended) and Unamended Fellowships in North America – most recently in the Great Lakes region, where numerous Amended and Unamended ecclesias are working together to unify their ecclesias. The Central Fellowship in North America is still often referred to today as the Amended Fellowship.

The Berean Fellowship was formed in 1923 as a result of varying views on military service in England, and on the atonement in North America. The majority of the North American Bereans re-joined the main body of Christadelphians in 1952. A number continue as a separate community, numbering around 200 in Texas, 100 in Kenya and 30 in Wales. Most of the divisions still in existence within the Christadelphian community today stem from further divisions of the Berean Fellowship.

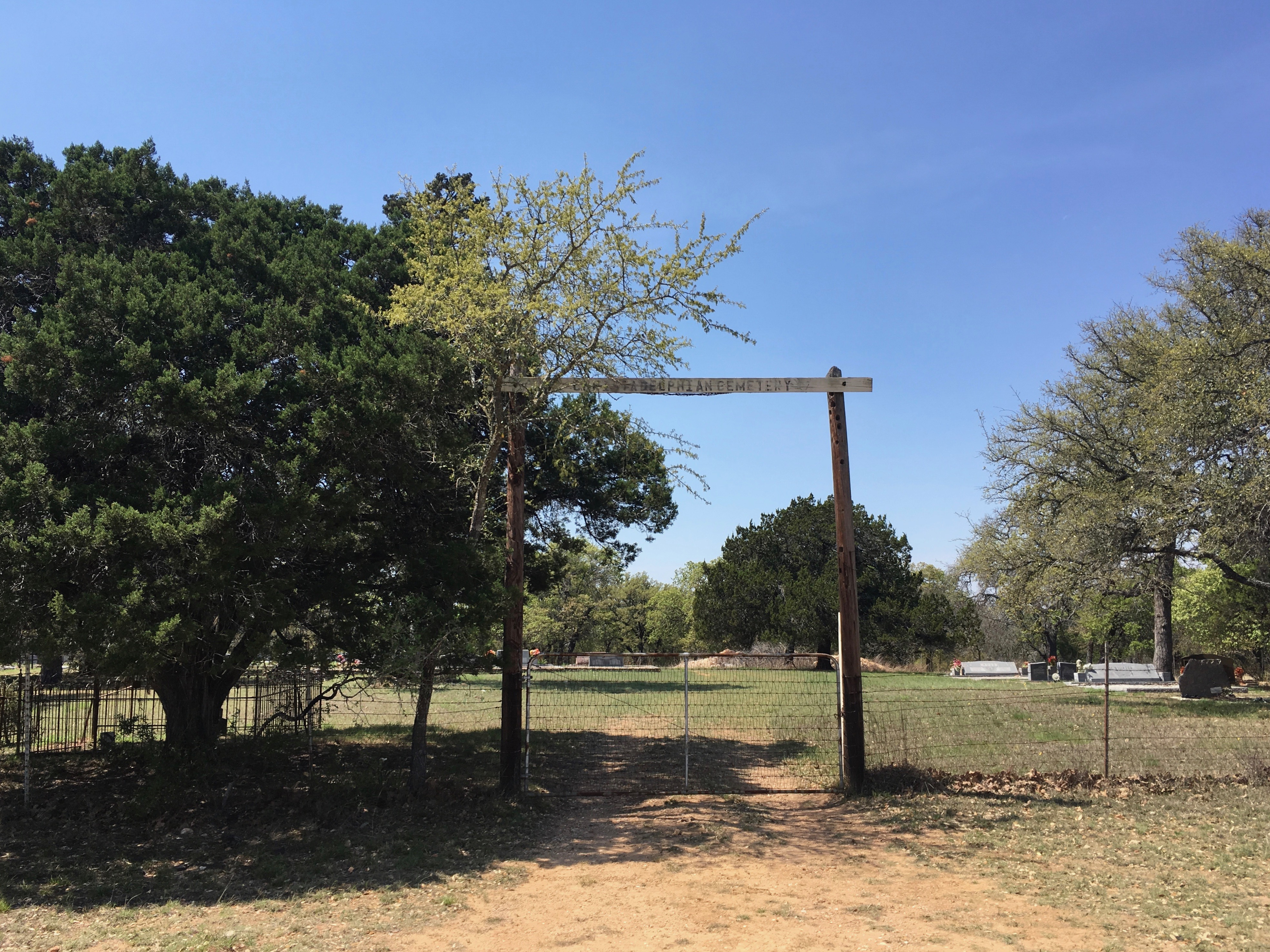
Gate of the Christadelphian Cemetery near Hye, Texas

The Dawn Fellowship are the result of an issue which arose in 1942 among the Berean Fellowship regarding divorce and remarriage. The stricter party formed the Dawn Fellowship who, following re-union on the basis of unity of belief with the Lightstand Fellowship in Australia in 2007 increased in number. There are now thought to be around 800 members in England, Australia, Canada, India, Jamaica, Poland, the Philippines, Russia and Kenya.

The Old Paths Fellowship was formed in 1957 in response to the reunion of the Central and Suffolk Street Fellowships. A minority from the Central Fellowship held that the reasons for separation remained and that full unity of belief on all fundamental principles of Bible teaching was necessary; thus reunion was only possible with the full agreement and understanding of all members rather than a decision by majority vote. Ecclesias forming the Old Paths Fellowship arose in England, Australia, New Zealand and Canada numbering around 500 members in total. They now number around 250 members in total, with members in Australia, England, Mexico and New Zealand. They maintain that they hold to the original Central Fellowship position held prior to the 1957 Reunion.

Other fellowships with specific beliefs on divorce and remarriage, and thus remain separate from the main body of Christadelphians, include the Companion Fellowship and the Pioneer Fellowship.

According to Bryan Wilson, functionally the definition of a "fellowship" within Christadelphian history has been mutual or unilateral exclusion of groupings of ecclesias from the breaking of bread. This functional definition still holds true in North America, where the Unamended Fellowship and the Church of God of the Abrahamic Faith are not received by most North American Amended ecclesias. But outside North America this functional definition no longer holds. Many articles and books on the doctrine and practice of fellowship now reject the notion itself of separate "fellowships" among those who recognise the same baptism, viewing such separations as schismatic. Many ecclesias in the Central fellowship would not refuse a baptised Christadelphian from a minority fellowship from breaking bread; the exclusion is more usually the other way.

While their operational methods emphasize different important qualities, the Central, Old Paths, Dawn and Berean fellowships generally subscribe to the Birmingham Amended Statement of Faith (BASF), though the latter two have additional clauses or supporting documents to explain their position. Most Unamended ecclesias use the Birmingham Unamended Statement of Faith (BUSF) with one clause being different from the aforementioned BASF.

Within the Central fellowship individual ecclesias also may have their own statement of faith, whilst still accepting the statement of faith of the larger community. Some ecclesias have statements on specific positions, especially on divorce and re-marriage, making clear that offence would be caused by anyone in that position seeking to join them at the 'Breaking of Bread' service. Other ecclesias tolerate a degree of divergence from commonly held Christadelphian views.

For each fellowship, anyone who publicly assents to the doctrines described in the statement and is in good standing in their "home ecclesia" is generally welcome to participate in the activities of any other ecclesia.

=== Related groups ===
There are a number of groups who, while sharing a common heritage and many Christadelphian teachings, have adopted alternative names in order to dissociate themselves from what they believe to be false teachings and/or practice within the main Christadelphian body. Ranging from just a few members to around 100, each group restricts fellowship to its own members. These include groups mainly localised to the UK such as the Apostolic Fellowship of Christ as well as larger groups such as the Apostolic Bible Truth Ecclesias found in Kenya, Uganda, Democratic Republic of Congo as well as the UK.

The Church of God of the Abrahamic Faith (CGAF) also has common origins with Christadelphians and shares Christadelphian beliefs. Numbering around 400 (primarily Ohio and Florida, USA), they are welcomed into fellowship by some "Central" Christadelphians and are currently involved in unity talks.

== Historical antecedents ==
One criticism of the Christadelphian movement has been over the claim of John Thomas and Robert Roberts to have "re-discovered" scriptural truth. However one might argue that all Protestant groups make the same claims to some extent. Although both men believed that they had "recovered" the true doctrines for themselves and contemporaries, they also believed there had always existed a group of true believers throughout the ages, albeit marred by the apostasy.

The most notable Christadelphian attempts to find a continuity of those with doctrinal similarities since that point have been geographer Alan Eyre's two books The Protesters (1975) and Brethren in Christ (1982) in which he shows that many individual Christadelphian doctrines had been previously believed. Eyre focused in particular on the Radical Reformation, and also among the Socinians and other early Unitarians and the English Dissenters. In this way, Eyre was able to demonstrate substantial historical precedents for individual Christadelphian teachings and practices, and believed that the Christadelphian community was the 'inheritor of a noble tradition, by which elements of the Truth were from century to century hammered out on the anvil of controversy, affliction and even anguish'. Although noting in the introduction to 'The Protestors' that 'Some recorded herein perhaps did not have "all the truth" — so the writer has been reminded', Eyre nevertheless claimed that the purpose of the work was to 'tell how a number of little-known individuals, groups and religious communities strove to preserve or revive the original Christianity of apostolic times', and that 'In faith and outlook they were far closer to the early springing shoots of first-century Christianity and the penetrating spiritual challenge of Jesus himself than much that has passed for the religion of the Nazarene in the last nineteen centuries'.

Eyre's research has been criticized by some of his Christadelphian peers, not least because John Thomas himself robustly repudiated Socinianism. As a result Christadelphian commentary on the subject has subsequently been more cautious and circumspect, with caveats being issued concerning Eyre's claims, and the two books less used and publicised than in previous years.

Nevertheless, even with most source writings of those later considered heretics destroyed, evidence can be provided that since the first century BC there have been various groups and individuals who have held certain individual Christadelphian beliefs or similar ones. For example, all the distinctive Christadelphian doctrines (with the exception of the non-literal devil), down to interpretations of specific verses, can be found particularly among sixteenth century Socinian writers (e.g. the rejection of the doctrines of the trinity, pre-existence of Christ, immortal souls, a literal hell of fire, original sin). Early English Unitarian writings also correspond closely to those of Christadelphians. Also, recent discoveries and research have shown a large similarity between Christadelphian beliefs and those held by Isaac Newton who, among other things, rejected the doctrines of the trinity, immortal souls, a personal devil and literal demons. Further examples are as follows:

- The belief in unconsciousness until resurrection, as opposed to the immortality of the soul, has been held marginally throughout the history of both Judaism and Christianity; such sources include certain Jewish pseudepigraphal works, rabbinical works, Clement of Rome, Arnobius in the third to fourth century, a succession of Arabic and Syrian Christians from the third to the eighth century including Aphrahat, Ephrem, Narsai, Isaac of Nineveh (d.700), and Jacob of Sarug, Jewish commentators such as Abraham Ibn Ezra (1092–1167), Maimonides (1135–1204), and Joseph Albo (1380–1444), and later Christians such as John Wycliffe, Michael Sattler, and many Anabaptists, long before Martin Luther challenged Roman Catholic views on heaven and hell with his teaching of "soul sleep".
- The Christadelphian denial of the pre-existence of Christ, and interpretation of verses such as "I came down from heaven" (John 6:38) as relating to the virgin birth and Christ's mission only, are found in the teachings of: the early Jewish Christians, the Ebionites, the Nazoreans (or Nazarenes), the Theodotians of Theodotus the Cobbler (who believed Jesus was supernaturally begotten but a man nonetheless), Artemon, Paul of Samosata, the Pseudo-Clementines, and Photinus (d.376); naturally however, given that non-Trinitarian beliefs were punishable with death from the fourth century to the seventeenth, it would be foolish to expect to discover any consistent line of people or groups holding such beliefs. Such attempts become possible only after the Protestant Reformation. Christadelphian Christology is found from the publication of Lelio Sozzini's commentary on John (1561) through to the increasing resistance to the miraculous among English Unitarians after 1800.
- Affinities with the Christadelphian concept of the devil and/or demons are found in a range of early Jewish and later Christian sources such as: Jonathan ben Uzziel (100s AD); Joshua Ben Karha (135–160); Levi ben Gershon (d. 1344); David Kimhi (1160); Saadia ben Joseph (892–942); Shimon ben Lakish (230–270), David Joris (1501-1556), Lelio Sozzini (1525-1562), Fausto Sozzini (1539-1604), Gerrard Winstanley (1609-1676), Joseph Mede (1640), Jacob Bauthumley (1650), Thomas Hobbes (1651), Lodowick Muggleton (1669), Dr. Anthonie van Dale (1685), Emanuel Swedenborg (1688-1772), Balthasar Bekker (1695), Isaac Newton; Christian Thomasius (1704), Arthur Ashley Sykes (1737), Nathaniel Lardner (1742), The New-Light Quakers of Lynn and New Bedford (1800s), Elias Hicks (1748-1830), Dr. Richard Mead (1755), Hugh Farmer (at least in the account of Christ's temptation; 1761), William Ashdowne (1791), John Simpson (1804), John Epps (1842) and Primitive Baptist Universalists also known No-Hellers (1907 to present)

Organised worship in England for those whose beliefs anticipated those of Christadelphians became possible only in 1779 when the Act of Toleration 1689 was amended to permit denial of the Trinity, and fully only when property penalties were removed in the Doctrine of the Trinity Act 1813. This is only 35 years before John Thomas' 1849 lecture tour in Britain which attracted significant support from an existing non-Trinitarian Adventist base, particularly, initially, in Scotland where Arian, Socinian, and unitarian (with a small 'u' as distinct from the Unitarian Church of Theophilus Lindsey) views were prevalent.

== Practices and worship ==
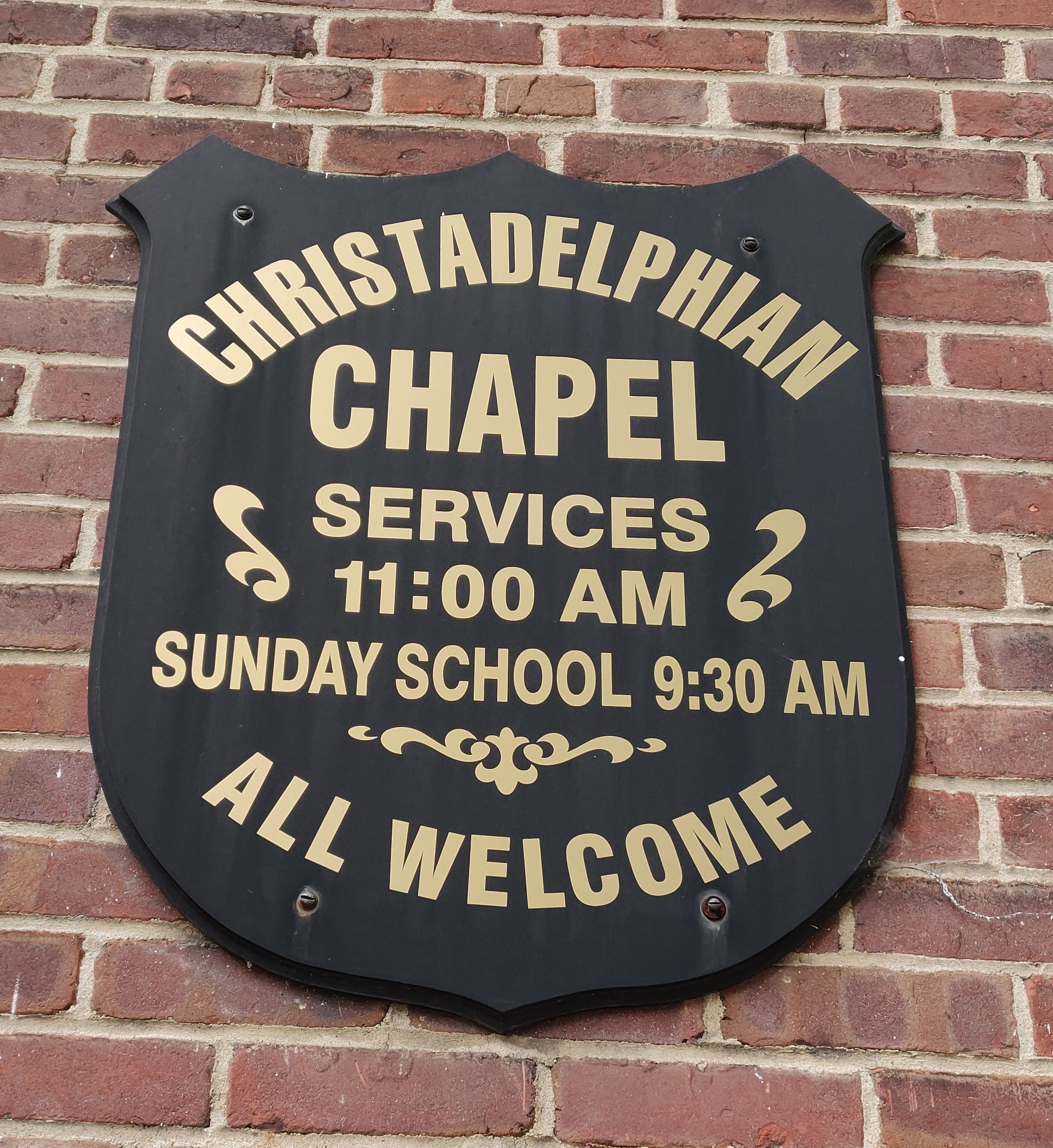
A sign showing the times of service for a Christadelphian ecclesia in Richmond, Virginia

Christadelphians are organised into local congregations, that commonly call themselves ecclesias, which is taken from usage in the New Testament and is Greek for gathering of those summoned. Congregational worship, which usually takes place on Sunday, centres on the remembrance of the death and celebration of the resurrection of Jesus Christ by the taking part in the "memorial service". Additional meetings are often organised for worship, prayer, preaching and Bible study.

Ecclesias are typically involved in preaching the gospel (evangelism) in the form of public lectures on Bible teaching, college-style seminars on reading the Bible, and Bible Reading Groups. Correspondence courses are also used widely, particularly in areas where there is no established Christadelphian presence. Some ecclesias, organisations or individuals also preach through other media like video, and internet forums. There are also a number of Bible Education/Learning Centres around the world.

Only baptised (by complete immersion in water) believers are considered members of the ecclesia. Ordinarily, baptism follows someone making a "good confession" (cf. 1 Tim. 6:12) of their faith before two or three nominated elders of the ecclesia they are seeking to join. The good confession has to demonstrate a basic understanding of the main elements – "first principles" – of the faith of the community. The children of members are encouraged to attend Christadelphian Sunday schools and youth groups. Interaction between youth from different ecclesias is encouraged through regional and national youth gatherings, conferences and camping holidays.

Christadelphians understand the Bible to teach that male and female believers are equal in God's sight, and also that there is a distinction between the roles of male and female members. Women are typically not eligible to teach in formal gatherings of the ecclesia when male believers are present, are expected to cover their heads (using hat or scarf, etc.) during formal services, and do not sit on the main ecclesial arranging (organising) committees. They do, however: participate in other ecclesial and inter-ecclesial committees; participate in discussions; teach children in Sunday schools as well as at home, teach other women and non-members; perform music; discuss and vote on business matters; and engage in the majority of other activities. Generally, at formal ecclesial and inter-ecclesial meetings the women wear head coverings when there are acts of worship and prayer.

There are ecclesially accountable committees for co-ordinated preaching, youth and Sunday school work, conscientious objection issues, care of the elderly, and humanitarian work. These do not have any legislative authority, and are wholly dependent upon ecclesial support. Ecclesias in an area may regularly hold joint activities combining youth groups, fellowship, preaching, and Bible study.

Christadelphians refuse to participate in any military or police force because they are conscientious objectors (not to be confused with pacifists).

There is a strong emphasis on personal Bible reading and study and many Christadelphians use the Bible Companion to help them systematically read the Bible each year.

=== Hymnody and music ===
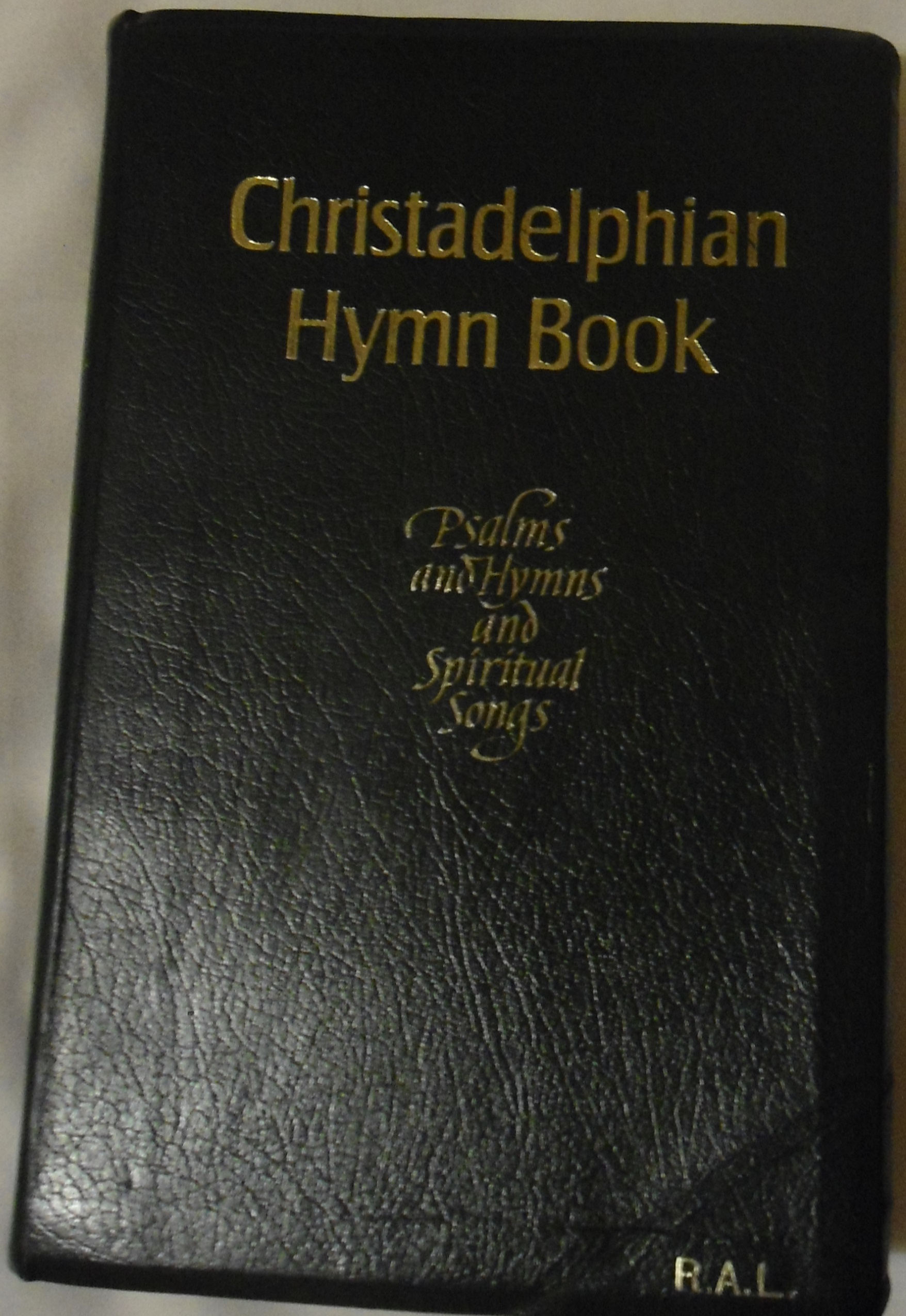
The 2002 English language hymn book

Christadelphian hymnody makes considerable use of the hymns of the Anglican and English Protestant traditions (even in US ecclesias the hymnody is typically more English than American). In many Christadelphian hymn books a sizeable proportion of hymns are drawn from the Scottish Psalter and non-Christadelphian hymn-writers including Isaac Watts, Charles Wesley, William Cowper and John Newton. Despite incorporating non-Christadelphian hymns however, Christadelphian hymnody preserves the essential teachings of the community.

The earliest hymn book published was the "Sacred Melodist" which was published by Benjamin Wilson in Geneva, Illinois in 1860. The next was the hymn book published for the use of Baptised Believers in the Kingdom of God (an early name for Christadelphians) by George Dowie in Edinburgh in 1864. In 1865 Robert Roberts published a collection of Scottish psalms and hymns called The Golden Harp (which was subtitled "Psalms, Hymns, and Spiritual Songs, compiled for the use of Immersed Believers in 'The Things concerning the Kingdom of God and the Name of Jesus Christ'"). This was replaced only five years later by the first "Christadelphian Hymn Book" (1869), compiled by J. J. and A. Andrew, and this was revised and expanded in 1874, 1932 and 1964. A thorough revision by the Christadelphian Magazine and Publishing Association resulted in the latest (2002) edition which is almost universally used by English-speaking Christadelphian ecclesias. In addition some Christadelphian fellowships have published their own hymn books.

Some ecclesias use the Praise the Lord songbook. It was produced with the aim of making contemporary songs which are consistent with Christadelphian theology more widely available. Another publication, the "Worship" book is a compilation of songs and hymns that have been composed only by members of the Christadelphian community. This book was produced with the aim of providing extra music for non-congregational music items within services (e.g. voluntaries, meditations, et cetera) but has been adopted by congregations worldwide and is now used to supplement congregational repertoire.

In the English-speaking world, worship is typically accompanied by organ or piano, though in recent years a few ecclesias have promoted the use of other instruments (e.g. strings, wind and brass as mentioned in the Psalms). This trend has also seen the emergence of some Christadelphian bands and the establishment of the Christadelphian Art Trust to support performing, visual and dramatic arts within the Christadelphian community.

In other countries, hymn books have been produced in local languages, sometimes resulting in styles of worship which reflect the local culture. It has been noted that Christadelphian hymnody has historically been a consistent witness to Christadelphian beliefs, and that hymnody occupies a significant role in the community.
