= Meyer (surname) =

Origin
- Region of origin: German-speaking Europe, Netherlands, Flanders, Eastern Europe

Meyer is an originally German, Dutch, and Jewish surname. With its numerous variants (Myer, Meyr, Meier, Meijer, Mayer, Maier, Mayr, Mair, Miers, etc.), it is a common German surname. Its original meaning in Middle High German is from mei(g)er, "manager (of a lord's country estate)", derived from Latin maior domus, i.e. "headman of a household" (cf. mayor), later on also meaning "tenant" or "(free) farmer". It is therefore a rough equivalent of the English Steward, which has also been turned into surnames such as Stuart.

This appellation was also frequently used to form longer, more specific surnames such as Bachmeier, Bergmair or Niedermeier. Some German Jews adopted Meyer or a variant thereof as a surname when they assimilated to German culture in the 18th century, as it is close to the Hebrew first name Me'ir (מֵאִיר), "shining, enlightened".

== Geographical distribution ==
In 2014, the surname Meyer was most often found (by percentage of the population) in Germany, Switzerland, Luxembourg and South Africa. The name ranked 6th in Germany and 8th in Switzerland.

== Notable people ==
=== A–D ===
- Adolf Meyer (disambiguation)
- Albert Meyer (disambiguation)
- Alfred Meyer (disambiguation)
- Andrew Meyer (born 2000), American football player
- Anita Meyer (born 1954), Dutch singer
- Anthony Meyer (disambiguation)
- Antoine Meyer (1801–1857), Belgian mathematician
- Axel Meyer (born 1960), German evolutionary biologist
- Bernard Meyer (disambiguation)
- Bernhard Meyer (1767–1836), German physician and naturalist
- Bertrand Meyer (born 1950), French computer scientist, designed the Eiffel programming language
- Birgit Meyer (born 1960), Dutch religious studies scholar
- Breckin Meyer (born 1974), American actor and producer
- Bunny Meyer (born 1985), American YouTube vlogger
- Burt Meyer (1926–2025), American inventor
- Cameron Meyer (born 1988), Australian professional racing cyclist
- Carlos Enrique Meyer (born 1953), Argentine businessman and politician
- Christian Meyer (disambiguation)
- Christoph Meyer (born 1975), German politician
- Christopher Meyer (1944–2022), British Ambassador to the U.S.
- Clara Meyer (1864–1920), Danish-Swedish patron of the arts
- Colleen Meyer (1939–2015), American politician and businesswoman
- Conrad Meyer (disambiguation)
- Cord Meyer (1920–2001), American Central Intelligence Agency official
- Dakota Meyer (born 1988), U.S. Medal of Honor recipient
- Daniel Meyer (disambiguation)
- Debbie Meyer (born 1952), U.S. Olympic swimmer
- Deon Meyer (born 1958), South African thriller novelist
- Dina Meyer (born 1968), U.S. actor
- Dirk Meyer, U.S. microprocessor designer
- Don Meyer (1944–2014), American basketball coach
- Drew Meyer (born 1981), American baseball player
- Dutch Meyer (1898–1982), American college sports coach

=== E–K ===
- Edgar Meyer (born 1960), U.S. double bassist
- Eduard Meyer (1855–1930), German historian
- Edward Meyer (disambiguation)
- Elana Meyer (born 1966), South African long-distance runner
- Eric Meyer (disambiguation), various people
- Ernest Meyer (1865–1919), French equestrian
- Ernst Meyer (disambiguation)
- Eugene Meyer (disambiguation)
- Eyal Meyer (born 1985), Chilean actor
- Florence Meyer (1911–1962), American portrait photographer
- Frank Meyer (disambiguation)
- Franz Meyer (disambiguation)
- Fred Meyer (disambiguation)
- Fridel Meyer (1904–1982), German-born long-distance kayaker, emigrated to England
- Georg Meyer (disambiguation)
- George Meyer (disambiguation)
- Greg Meyer (born 1955), American long-distance runner
- Gwendolyn Sontheim Meyer, Cargill heiress and equestrian
- Hajo Meyer (1924–2014), German-Dutch physicist and Jewish political activist
- Hannes Meyer (1889–1954), Swiss architect and director of the Bauhaus
- Hans Meyer (disambiguation)
- Heinrich Meyer (disambiguation)
- Henry Meyer (disambiguation)
- Heyneke Meyer (born 1967), South African rugby union coach
- Hubert Meyer (1913–2012), German Waffen-SS officer
- Ilan Meyer (born 1956), American psychiatric epidemiologist
- J. Edward Meyer (born 1935), American politician
- Jack Meyer (1932–1967), American professional baseball player
- Jacob Meyer (disambiguation)
- Jean Meyer (disambiguation)
- Jeff Meyer (disambiguation)
- Jens Meyer (born 1971), German politician
- Jeromie Meyer (born 1997), American wheelchair basketball player
- Jessica Kate Meyer, American actress and rabbi
- Joachim Meyer, German fencer, wrote Fundamental Descriptions of the Art of Fencing (1570)
- Joe-Fio Neenyann Meyer (1918–?), Ghanaian diplomat
- Johan Meyer (disambiguation)
- Johann Mayer (disambiguation)
- Johannes Meyer (disambiguation)
- John Meyer (disambiguation)
- Joseph Meyer (disambiguation)
- Joyce Meyer (born 1943), U.S. Christian Charismatic speaker and writer
- Julius Meyer (disambiguation)
- Karl Meyer (disambiguation), multiple people
- Katherine Meyer Graham (1917–2001), American publisher
- Katie Meyer (2000–2022), American soccer player
- Kenneth J. Meyer, American politician
- Kerstin Meyer (1928–2020), Swedish mezzo-soprano
- Kirstine Meyer (1861–1941), Danish physicist
- Klaus Meyer (1937–2014), German football player
- Krzysztof Meyer (born 1943), Polish composer
- Kurt Meyer (disambiguation)

=== L–Z ===
- Laurenz Meyer (born 1948), German politician
- Lena Meyer-Landrut (born 1991), German singer
- Léon Meyer (1868–1948), French politician
- Léone-Noëlle Meyer (born 1939), French businesswoman and philanthropist
- Lodewijk Meyer (1629–1681), Dutch physician, classical scholar, translator, lexicographer, and playwright
- Lori Meyer, American softball coach
- Lucy Rider Meyer (1849–1922), American educator, physician, author, and social worker
- Lyndsay Meyer (born 1973), US-American ski mountaineer
- Maile Meyer (born 1957), Native Hawaiian activist and entrepreneur
- Marany Meyer (born 1984), South African and New Zealand chess player
- Marc Meyer, American archaeologist and anthropologist
- Marc Eugene Meyer (1842–1925), U.S. businessman
- Mark Meyer (disambiguation)
- Maria Grabher-Meyer (1898–1970), Liechtensteiner poet and short story writer
- Marshall Meyer (1930–1993), U.S. rabbi and human rights activist
- Martin Meyer (disambiguation)
- Mary Meyer (disambiguation)
- Matt Meyer (born 1971), governor of Delaware
- Maud Meyer, Sierra Leonean Nigerian singer
- Max Meyer (disambiguation), several people
- Michele Meyer, American politician
- Miriah Meyer, American computer scientist
- Nathan Meyer (born 1982), South African Paralympian
- Nicholas Meyer (born 1945), U.S. film-maker
- Pat Meyer (born 1972), American football player and coach
- Paul Meyer (disambiguation)
- Peter Meyer (disambiguation), several people
- Peyton Meyer (born 1998), American actor
- Philip Meyer (1930–2023), American journalist and scholar
- Philipp Meyer (born 1974), American author
- Philipp Meyer (politician) (1896–1962), German politician
- Ray Meyer (1913–2006), U.S. basketball coach
- Rémo Meyer (born 1980), Swiss football (soccer) player
- Rich Meyer (born 1985), American bassist
- Richard Meyer (disambiguation)
- Robert Meyer (disambiguation)
- Roelf Meyer (born 1947), South African politician
- Russ Meyer (1922–2004), U.S. filmmaker
- Sabine Meyer (born 1959), German clarinettist
- Sandra Payson Meyer (1926–2004), American arts patron, socialite
- Sarah E. Meyer, American animation artist
- Schuyler M. Meyer (1885–1970), New York politician
- Scott Meyer (disambiguation)
- Selma Meyer, Dutch pacifist, feminist and resistance fighter of Jewish origin
- Stephen C. Meyer (born 1958), U.S. philosopher of science and Intelligent Design proponent
- Stephenie Meyer (born 1973), American author best known as creator of the Twilight series
- Sven Meyer (disambiguation)
- Sydney Meyer (born 1995), Canadian actress
- Ted Meyer, rugby league footballer of the 1930s for New Zealand, and Northland
- Thérèse Meyer (born 1948), Swiss politician
- Thomas Meyer (disambiguation)
- Urban Meyer (born 1964), American college football coach
- Viktor Meyer (1848–1897), German chemist
- Wilhelm Meyer (disambiguation)
- William Meyer (disambiguation)
- Wolfgang Meyer (1954–2019), German clarinettist and professor of clarinet
- Yves Meyer (born 1939), French mathematician and scientist

== See also ==
- Meyer (disambiguation)
- Von Meyer, Myer (disambiguation), Meyr, Meier (disambiguation), Meijer, Meir, Mayer, Maier, Mayr, Mair
- Meyers, Myers
- Meyerson
- Meijer (surname)
- German family name etymology
