= John Myers =

John Myers may refer to:

- John Myers (medium) (died 1972) British dentist and spiritualist medium
- John Myers (photographer) (born 1944), British landscape and portrait photographer
- John Myers (radio executive) (1959–2019), British radio executive and presenter
- John Gillespy Myers (1831–1901), owner of John G. Myers Company, a department store in Albany, New York
- J. G. Myers (John Golding Myers, 1897–1942), British entomologist
- John H. Myers (born 1945), American businessman
- John Howard Myers (1880–1956), farmer and political figure on Prince Edward Island
- John J. Myers (1941–2020), American Archbishop of Newark
- John L. Myers (1947–2015), American politician, member, Pennsylvania House of Representatives
- John Myers Myers (1906–1988), American author
- John Ripley Myers (1864–1899), co-founder of Bristol-Myers Squibb
- John S. Myers, Los Angeles politician
- John T. Myers (congressman) (1927–2015), United States Representative from Indiana
- John Twiggs Myers (1871–1952), United States Marine Corps general
- John Wescott Myers (1911–2008), World War II test pilot
- John W. Myers (c.1864–c.1919), Welsh-born baritone singer
- Buddy Myers (1906–1967), American sound engineer, sometimes credited as John Myers

== See also ==
- Jack Myers (disambiguation)
- John Meyers (disambiguation)
- John Miers (disambiguation)
- John Myres (1869–1954), British archaeologist
