= Albert Mayer =

Albert Mayer may refer to:

- Albert Mayer (canoeist) (born 1943), French sprint canoer
- Albert Mayer (planner) (1897–1981), American planner and architect
- Albert Mayer (soldier) (1892–1914), considered the first German soldier to die in World War I

== See also ==
- Albert Mayr (1943–2024), Italian composer
- Albert Maier (1860–1944), founder of the German Christadelphians
- Albert Meier (fl. 1940s–1950s), Swiss footballer
- Albert Meyer (disambiguation)
- Albert Myer (disambiguation)
