= John G. Myers =

John G. Myers may refer to:

- John Gillespy Myers (1831-1901), owner of John G. Myers Company, a department store in Albany, New York
- John Golding Myers (1897-1942), a British entomologist
