= Thomas Mayer =

Thomas Mayer may refer to:

== Sports ==
- Thomas Mayer (footballer, born 1927), German footballer in the 1956–57 DFB-Pokal
- Thomas Mayer (skier), see Kevin Bramble
- Thomas Mayer (motorcyclist) (born 1982), German motorcycle racer
- Thomas Mayer (footballer, born 1984), German footballer
- Thomas Mayer (footballer, born 1995), Austrian footballer

== Others ==
- Thomas Mayer (American economist) (1927–2015)
- Tom W. Mayer (active since 1965), writer and professor of English
- Thomas Mayer (conductor), chief conductor of Tasmanian Symphony Orchestra (1970–1974)
- Thomas Mayer (German economist) (born 1954)
- Thomas Johannes Mayer (1969–2025), German baritone

== See also ==
- Thomas Maier, American author and journalist
- Thomas Maier (footballer) (born 1998), Austrian footballer
- Thomas Mair (disambiguation)
- Thomas Meyer (disambiguation)
