= John Meyers =

John Meyers may refer to:

- John Meyers (American football) (1940–1998), former American football defensive tackle
- John Meyers (swimmer) (1880–1971), American freestyle swimmer and water polo player
- John Meyers (loyalist) (1745–1821), Upper Canada businessman and United Empire Loyalist
- Chief Meyers (John Tortes Meyers; 1880–1971), American baseball player

== See also ==
- John Meyer (disambiguation)
- John Miers (disambiguation)
- John Myers (disambiguation)
- Jonathan Rhys Meyers (born 1977), Irish actor and model
- John Myres (1869–1954), British archaeologist
