= Secretariat of Tourism, Environment and Sports (Argentina) =

- Secretaría de Turismo, Ambiente y Deportes
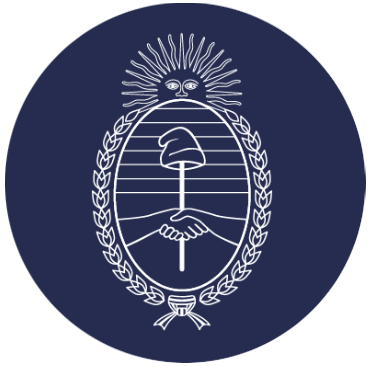

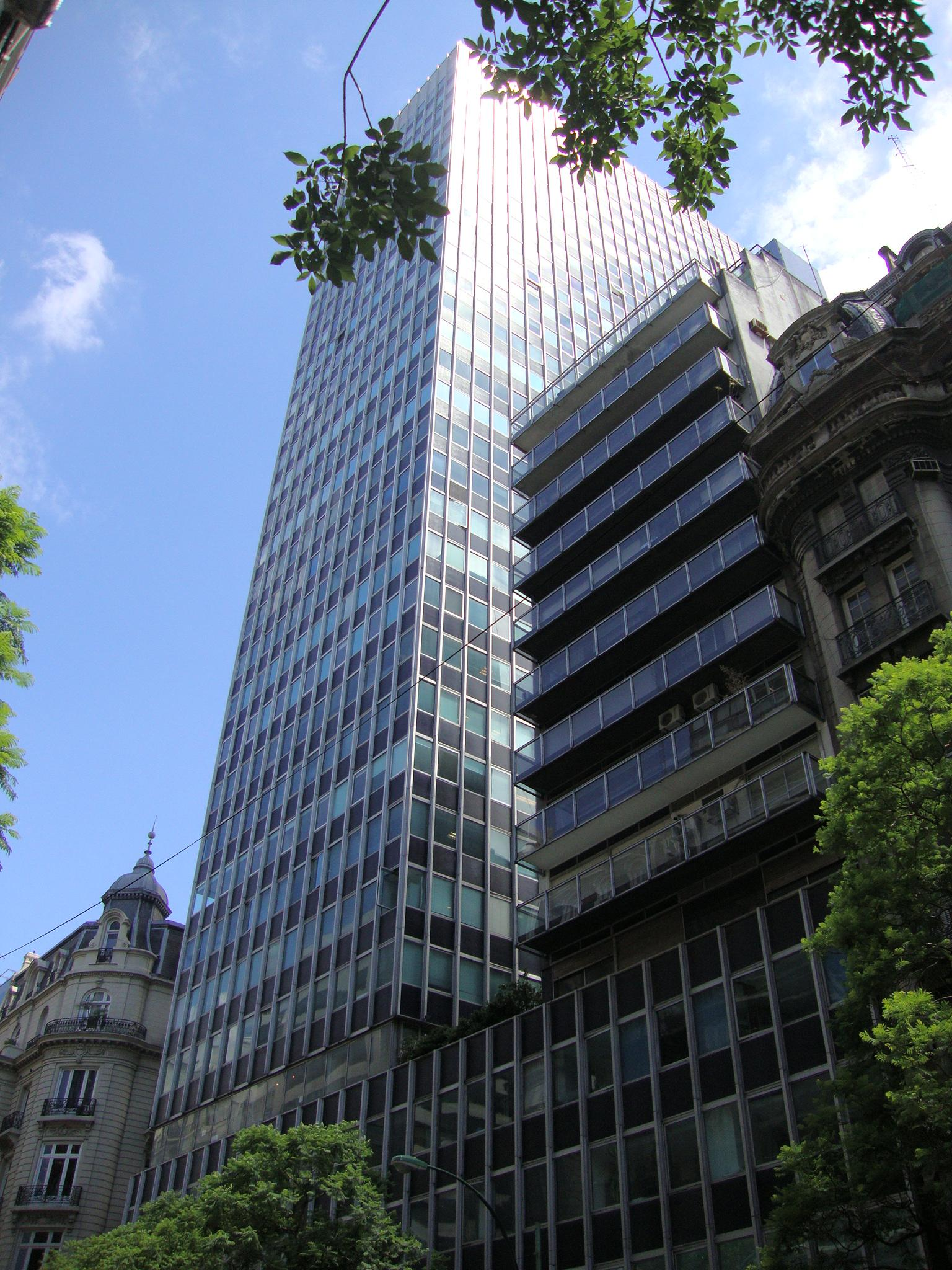
- Torre Brunetta, headquarters of the Ministry

Secretariat overview
- Formed: 2001; 25 years ago
- Jurisdiction: Government of Argentina
- Headquarters: Brunetta Tower, Buenos Aires
- Annual budget: $ 9,995,672,048 (2021)
- Secretariat executive: Daniel Scioli, Secretary
- Parent Secretariat: Undersecretary of Tourism
- Child agencies: Undersecretary of Environment; Undersecretary of Sports
- Website: argentina.gob.ar/turismo

The Secretariat of Tourism, Environment and Sports (Spanish: Secretaría de Turismo, Ambiente y Deportes, formerly, Ministry of Tourism and Sports) of Argentina is a secretariat of the national executive power that oversees and advises on Argentina's national tourism industry and the Argentine state's sports policy.

It was a ministry until it was dissolved by the administration led by Javier Milei in December 2023.

== History ==
It was created on 29 October 2001 as an extension of the Ministry of Culture, as the Ministry of Tourism, Culture and Sports, by President Fernando de la Rúa. The first minister responsible was Hernán Lombardi, but his tenure – as well as the ministry's existence – was cut short by the resignation of De la Rúa and his entire government less than two months later on 20 December 2001.

The tourism and sports portfolios were downgraded to a number of secretariat-level agencies of different ministries (chiefly Culture) by the following presidencies until 2010, when it was reinstated to ministerial level by Cristina Fernández de Kirchner, who appointed Carlos Enrique Meyer at the helm of the Ministry of Tourism. Gustavo Santos, the minister of tourism appointed by President Mauricio Macri, remained in office as Secretary of Tourism as the ministry was downgraded in a 2018 cabinet reshuffle that saw the number of cabinet ministries reduced from 22 to 11, though this arrangement was short-lived as the portfolio was reinstated as the Ministry of Tourism and Sports on 10 December 2019; Fernández's appointee to the ministry was Matías Lammens, former president of Club Atlético San Lorenzo de Almagro and Buenos Aires mayoral candidate in 2019 for the Frente de Todos.

The ministry was dissolved on December 10, 2023, following a presidential decree by President Javier Milei, and restructured as a secretariat under the supervision of the Chief of the Cabinet of Ministers. In the aftermath of the Argentina national football team's win in the 2024 Copa América final in July 2024, Milei's administration announced that Julio Garro ceased to be the undersecretary of sport because he said that the Argentina team's captain, Lionel Messi, and the AFA president, Claudio Tapia, should apologize for offensive chants.

== Responsibilities ==
As established by the ruling Ley de Ministerios ("Ministries Law"), adopted in December 2019, the Ministry of Tourism and Sports was reinstated (from having previously been part of the Culture Ministry's portfolio) due to tourism being a "pivotal activity for the development of the nation," and due to the need of "rationally exploiting it" "making use of tourist attractions and resources", as well as coordinating the national sports industry.

The Ministry's responsibilities and attributions were outlined in Article 23 (nonies) of the law, which states that, among others, it was within the ministry's competence overseeing the design and execution of plans and programs pertaining to the tourism and high-performance sports in Argentina; promoting tourism and developing Argentina's image on an international scale as well as internally in Argentina itself; coordinating the joint work of the Federal Council of Tourism and the National Council of Sports and Physical Activities; working alongside the Ministry of Foreign Affairs to represent Argentina on a global scale in tourism and sports-related areas, as well as working alongside the Ministry of Transport to elaborate and implement national policy dealing with commercial air travel in tourism-related areas; and promoting the "Argentina Brand", among others.

=== Structure and dependencies ===
From 2019 to 2023, the Ministry of Tourism and Sports was organized into the following centralized dependencies:

  - Undersecretariat of Administrative Management (Secretaría de Gestión Administrativa)
  - Undersecretariat of Public Works (Secretaría de Obras Públicas)
- Secretariat of Tourism Development (Secretaría de Desarrollo Turístico)
  - Undersecretariat of National Tourism Quality, Accessibility and Sustainability (Subsecretaría de Calidad, Accesibilidad y Sustentabilidad del Turismo Nacional)
  - Undersecretariat of Strategic Development (Subsecretaría de Desarrollo Estratégico)
- Secretariat of Tourism Promotion (Secretaría de Promoción Turística)
  - Undersecretariat of Tourism Promotion and New Products (Subsecretaría de Promoción Turística y Nuevos Productos)
- Secretariat of Sports (Secretaría de Deportes)
  - Undersecretariat of Sports Infrastructure and National Competitions (Subsecretaría de Infraestructura Deportiva y Competencias Nacionales)
  - Undersecretariat of Integral Development of Sports Activities (Subsecretaría de Desarrollo Integral de la Actividad Deportiva)

Additionally, a number of decentralized dependencies also report to the Ministry of Tourism and Sports, including the National Institute for the Promotion of Tourism (Instituto Nacional de Promoción Turística; Inprotur), the National Antidoping Commission (Comisión Nacional Antidopaje, CNAD), and the National Agency for High Performance in Sports (Ente Nacional de Alto Rendimiento Deportivo, ENARD).

== Headquarters ==
The Ministry of Tourism and Sports was headquartered in the Brunetta Tower (es:Torre Brunetta), a 30-storey-high building located in Suipacha 1111, in the Retiro barrio of Buenos Aires; as of 2018, the ministry owned three floors and rented another four. The tower, also known as Torre Olivetti, is a little over 100 meters tall and was completed in 1965; its first occupant was the Olivetti S.A. firm.

== List of ministers and secretaries ==
No.	Minister	Party	Term	President
Ministry of Tourism, Culture and Sports (2001)
1	Hernán Lombardi	Radical Civic Union	29 October 2001 – 20 December 2001	Fernando de la Rúa
Ministry of Tourism (2010–2018)
2	Enrique Meyer	Justicialist Party	28 June 2010 – 10 December 2015	Cristina Fernández de Kirchner
3	Gustavo Santos	Republican Proposal	10 December 2015 – 5 September 2018	Mauricio Macri
Ministry of Tourism and Sports (2019–2023)
4	Matías Lammens	Independent	10 December 2019 – 10 December 2023	Alberto Fernández
Secretariat of Tourism, Environment and Sports (December 2023 present)
5	Daniel Scioli	Independent	February 2024–present	Javier Milei

== See also ==
- Sport in Argentina
- Tourism in Argentina
