= Wilhelm Meyer (engraver) =

Swedish artist and xylographer (1844–1944)

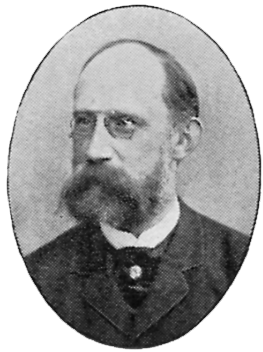
Wilhelm Meyer, from the Svenskt Porträttgalleri XX (1901)

Wilhelm Fredrik Meyer (6 June 1844, Stockholm - 10 November 1944, Stockholm) was a Swedish artist and xylographer.

== Biography ==
He was born to the lithographer, Johan Fredrik Meyer, a German immigrant, and his wife Catharina Therese née Rosenthal (1814–1896). Two of his brothers were also craftsmen; Otto Meyer, who was a metal caster, and Fritz Meyer, also a lithographer.

In the 1860s, he was a student at the Royal Swedish Academy of Fine Arts, then went to Leipzig, where he was an apprentice at several lithographic firms. After that, he returned to Stockholm to work in his father's company. This was followed by further studies in Copenhagen and Stuttgart. He opened his own business in Stockholm in the 1870s, where he introduced some of the new techniques he had learned in Germany. A recent surge of interest in Xylography helped his business grow.

In addition to illustrating literary works, he received commissions for scientific and technical illustrations from institutions such as the Swedish National Heritage Board. He also did photo engravings for the Ny Illustrerad Tidning and the Svenska Familj-Journalen, as well as advertisements and brochures.

He was also a skilled business manager and was the first in Sweden to establish a large private company with several apprentices, journeymen and master xylographers. He was very successful, financially, so when he retired and closed his studio in 1912, he said that he did so "with the flag flying high". In 1927, he donated a large number of his pictures, printing blocks and various tools to the Nationalmuseum. He also donated printing blocks to the Hallwyl Museum.

On his 100th birthday, he was interviewed by the press. The headline in the Svenska Dagbladet was a rhyme: "Ack vad tiden går och går – Meyer är nu hundra år" (Oh how time flies - Meyer is now a hundred years old). When the reporter from Dagens Nyheter was leaving, Meyer yelled out "Välkommen på 110-årsdagen" (Welcome to the 110th anniversary). He never married or had children. His grave is in the family plot at the Norra begravningsplatsen.

== Selected works ==
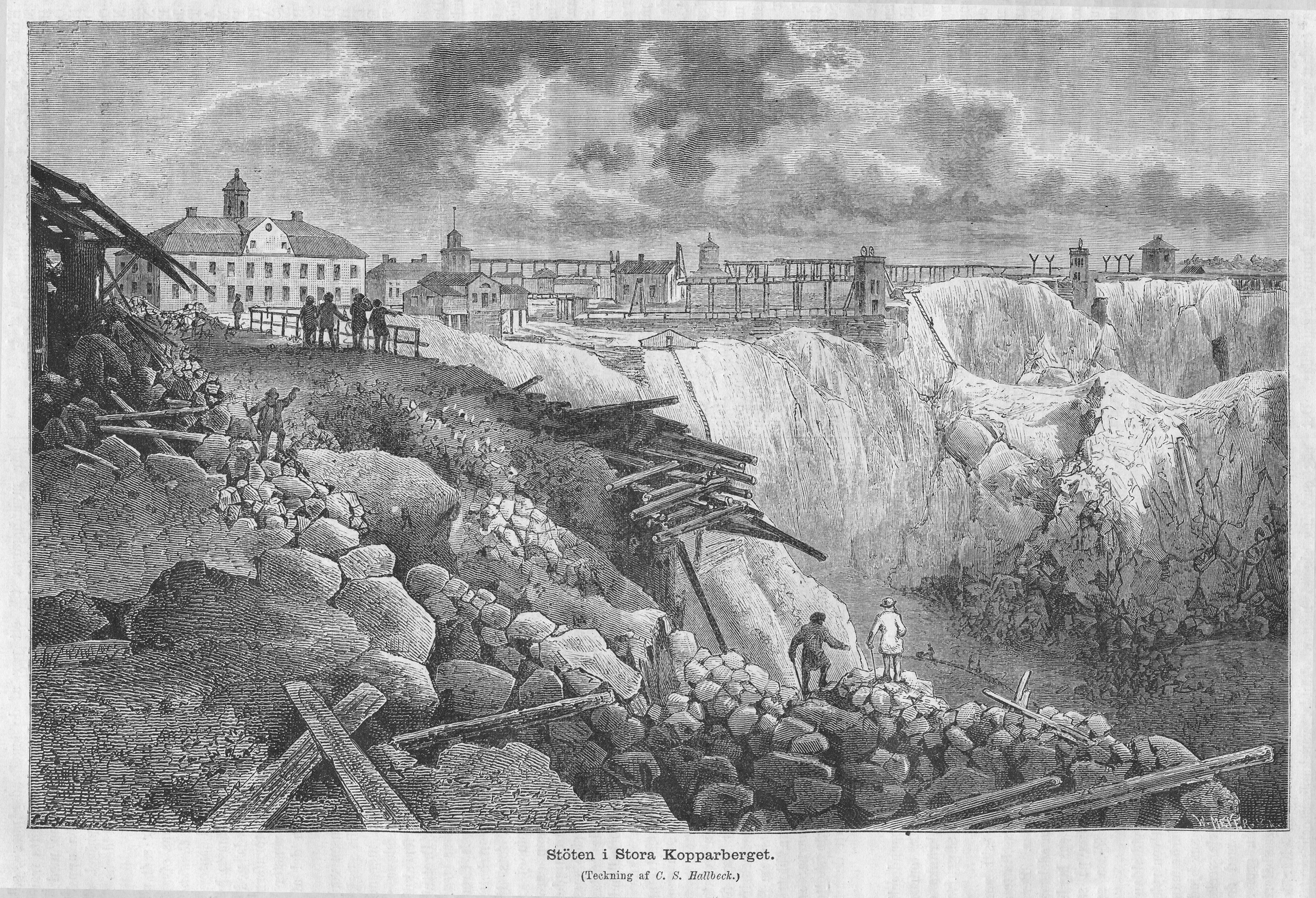
The Falun Copper Mine in Falun in Dalarna.

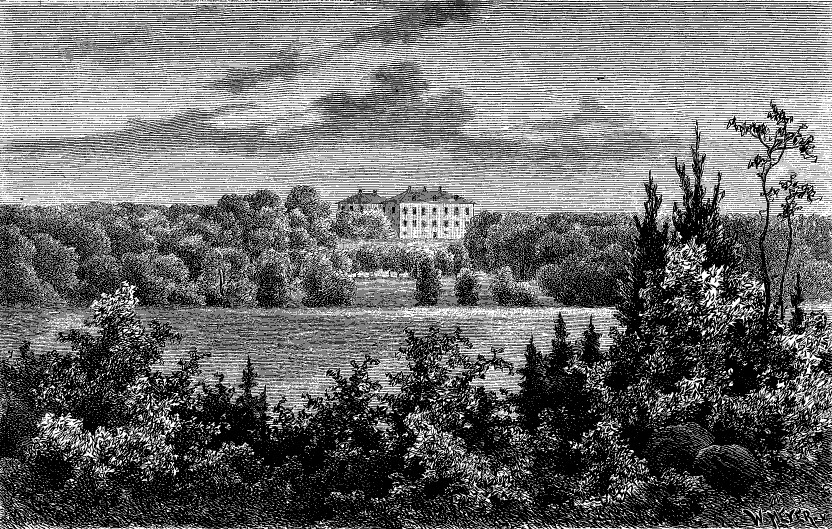
Venngarn Castle north of Sigtuna in Uppland
(after a drawing by Carl Svante Hallbeck).

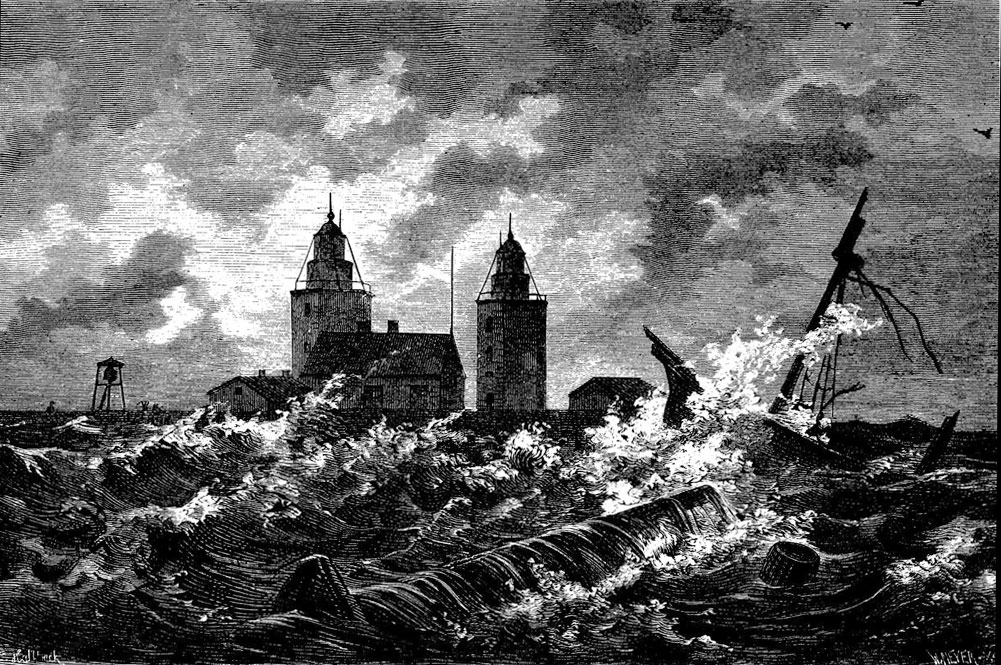
The Lighthouse at Nidingen in Onsala parish in Kungsbacka municipality in Halland county.

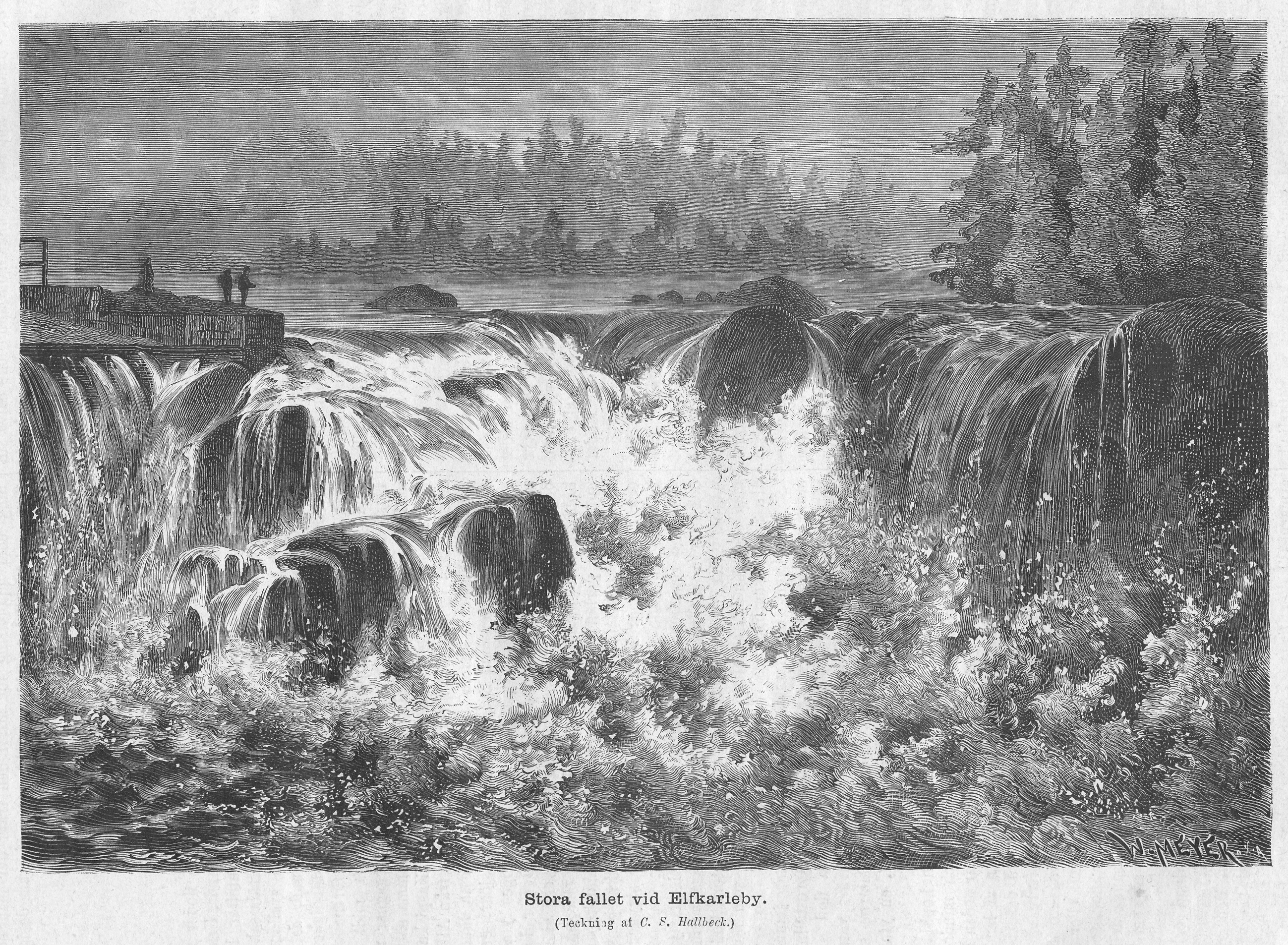
The Great Fall in Älvkarleby in Uppland in 1876
(after a drawing by Carl Svante Hallbeck).

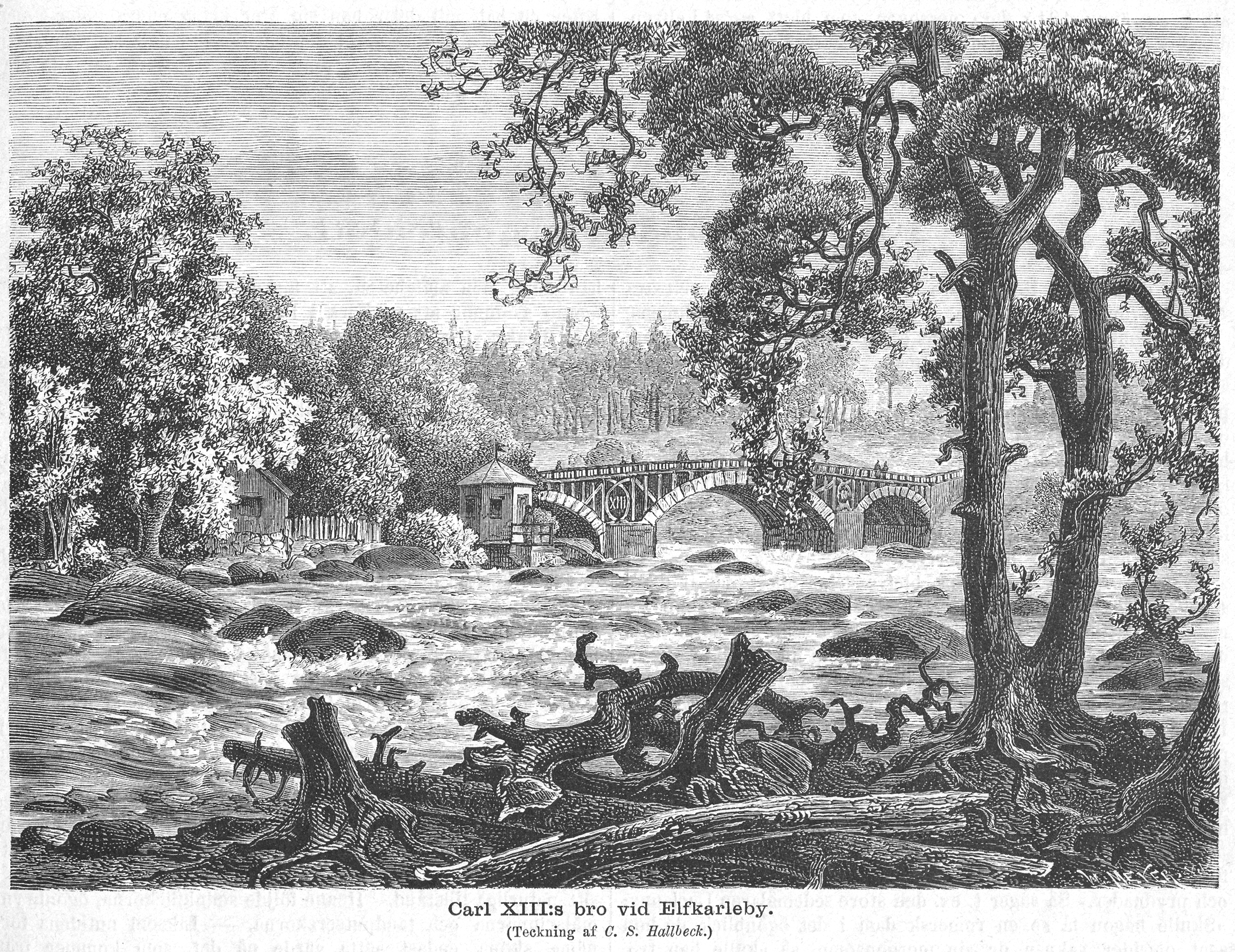
Charles XIII Bridge at Älvkarleby over the Dalälven in Uppland.

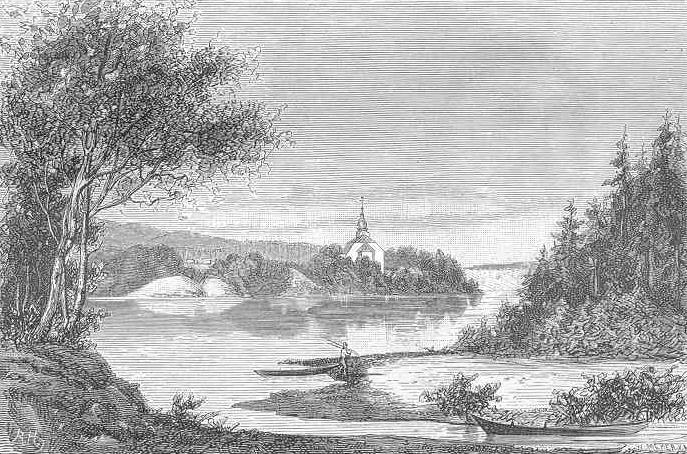
Leksand Church in Dalarna.
