= Heinrich Meyer (disambiguation) =

Heinrich Meyer may refer to:

- Heinrich Meyer-Buerdorf (1888–1971), German general and Knight's Cross recipient
- Heinrich Adolph Meyer (1822–1889), German factory owner and marine researcher
- Heinrich August Wilhelm Meyer (1800–1873), German Protestant pastor and theologian
- Heinrich Karl Ernst Martin Meyer (1904–1977), German-American professor, writer and Nazi sympathizer
