= Wilhelm Meyer =

Wilhelm Meyer may refer to:

- Wilhelm Franz Meyer (1856–1934), German mathematician
- Wilhelm Meyer (philologist) (1845–1917), German scholar who identified the poems of Hugh Prima
- Wilhelm Meyer, inculpated in the Adolf Beck case
- Wilhelm Meyer (physician) (1824–1895), Danish physician who invented adenoidectomy in 1868
- Wilhelm Meyer (engraver) (1844–1944), Swedish engraver
