= Miers =

Miers is a surname. Notable people with the name include:

- Alf Miers (1869–1944), australian rules footballer
- Sir Anthony Miers (1906–1985), Royal Navy admiral
- Sir David Miers (born 1937), British ambassador
- Earl Schenck Miers (1910–1972), American historian
- Edward J. Miers (1851–1930), English zoologist
- Gryan Miers (born 1999), Australian rules football player
- Harriet Miers (born 1945), American lawyer and Supreme Court nominee
- Henry Alexander Miers (1858–1942), British mineralogist and crystallographer
- John Miers (disambiguation), various people
- Marcos Miers (born 1990), Paraguayan footballer
- Max Miers (1940–2003), Australian rules footballer
- Miley Miers (1927–2010), American politician
- Robert W. Miers (1848–1930), U.S. Representative from Indiana
- Thomasina Miers (born 1976), English cook, writer and television presenter

== See also ==
- Miers, Lot, a commune in France
