= Ludwig von Gerdtell =

German theologian

- Born: Friedrich Siegfried Heinrich Ludwig von Gerdtell; 4 February 1872; Braunschweig
- Died: 1954 (aged 81–82)
- Theological work
- Tradition or movement: Disciples of Christ

Friedrich Siegfried Heinrich Ludwig von Gerdtell (4 February 1872 in Braunschweig – 1954) was a German theologian associated with the Disciples of Christ movement.

Ludwig von Gerdtell was born into an aristocratic Prussian family, his father and grandfather were officers in the Potsdam Guards Regiment. He did not follow this tradition and studied law, then theology with an emphasis on New Testament Studies. From 1902 to 1908 he worked as a traveling secretary for the German Student Christian Association. In 1908/09 he received his Ph.D. from the University of Erlangen with his work on Rudolf Eucken's position on early Christianity. He came to the conclusion that the statements of the New Testament church and the state disagreed. Between 1905 and 1928 he published six titles in the series Brennende Fragen der Weltanschauung für denkende moderne Menschen (Burning questions for modern-minded people) dealing in a critical manner with dogmas and interpretations. He decided that the church needed reform on the basis of the New Testament and was initially close to the Baptists but broke with them and SCM in the summer of 1909. He continued for a period friendship with Eberhard Arnold in Leipzig.

Then in 1912 Gerdtell was introduced by a friend in London to the Christadelphians in Birmingham, in particular Professor Thomas Turner, and through him began to associate with the German Christadelphians in Stuttgart and Berlin, from 1912-1930. From 1926-1928 the German Christadelphian Albert Maier arranged for Gerdtell to lecture to large audiences in Stuttgart.

Gerdtell also came into contact with the Disciples of Christ in America and influenced the association. Shortly thereafter, under the leadership of Dean E. Walker, an organization in the U.S. who wanted to support his efforts. Then Gerdtell increasingly came to associate with the Disciples of Christ.

Gerdtell was a staunch opponent of Adolf Hitler's policies from the 1920s spoke more and more openly against the Nazis. In January 1934, he made a comment while shopping at the local tobacco shop at Schöneiche Berlin to the effect that Hitler was synonymous with war. Subsequently, he was denounced by a neighbor. Only because of the courageous intervention of municipal policeman Max Dittrich was it possible for Gerdtell to escape during the night to avoid arrest and the following day. After flight through Switzerland, Italy and England, he arrived in the United States. All his property was confiscated. With the assistance Dean E. Walker he found employment teaching at the Department of Religion of Butler University in Indianapolis. After the Second World War he founded the European Evangelistic Society.

== Works ==
- Rudolf Euckens Christentum. Für Gebildete aller Stände, Becker, Eilenburg 1909
- Exreichskanzler Michaeli
- Die Urchristlichen Wunder vor dem Forum der modernen Weltanschauung Translated: Have We Satisfactory Evidence of the New Testament Miracles?
