= Alfred Meyer (disambiguation) =

Alfred Meyer (1891–1945) was a German politician.

Alfred Meyer may also refer to:

- Alfred Meyer (writer) (1882–1956), German author and publisher
- Alfred Meyer-Waldeck (1864–1928), German admiral
