= Carlos Enrique Meyer =

Argentine businessman and public official

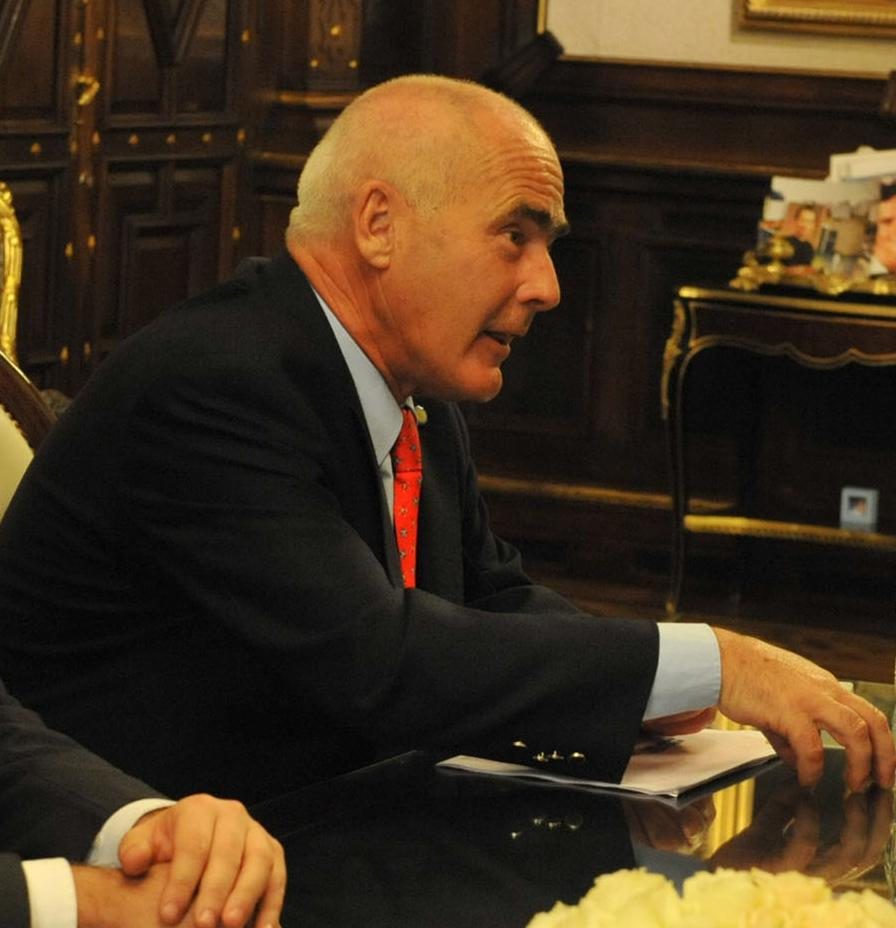

Minister of Tourism
- In office July 1, 2010 – December 10, 2015
- President: Cristina Fernández de Kirchner
- Preceded by: post created
- Succeeded by: Gustavo Santos

Secretary of Tourism and Sports
- In office August 21, 2003 – July 1, 2010
- Preceded by: Germán Pérez
- Succeeded by: post promoted to Ministry

Personal details
- Born: January 12, 1963 (age 63) Ramos Mejía, Buenos Aires Province
- Party: Justicialist Party
- Spouse: María Lavirgen Enríquez

Carlos Enrique Meyer (born 1953) is an Argentine businessman and public official who was appointed as the nation's Minister of Tourism upon the post's establishment on July 1, 2010.

== Life and times ==
Meyer was born in Ramos Mejía, a western suburb of Buenos Aires, and was raised in Puerto San Julián, in remote Santa Cruz Province. He completed four years of a Licentiate course in hospitality management studies in Buenos Aires, though he did not ultimately graduate. Meyer became a tour guide in 1979, and was later the proprietor of a Santa Cruz tour operator. He married the former María Lavirgen Enríquez, and they had three children.

Meyer entered public service upon his appointment as Provincial Minister of Tourism by the newly elected Governor Néstor Kirchner, in 1991. He worked closely with private investors from early in his tenure, notably with the founder of The North Face outfitters, Douglas Tompkins, who in 1992 purchased a 20,000 hectares (49,000 acres) ranch along the Santa Cruz River to establish the first of numerous nature preserves owned by Tompkins in Argentina. He focused promotional efforts on El Calafate and the neighboring Los Glaciares National Park, and approved the construction of the Comandante Armando Tola International Airport at El Calafate, opened in 2000.

Kirchner became President of Argentina in 2003. A subsequent dispute with the Vice President, Daniel Scioli, led to the dismissal of the Secretary of Tourism, Germán Pérez, and of a number of other officials recommended by Scioli. Citing the need to "retake control of an office which needed a change in personnel," Kirchner named Meyer to the post on August 21.

Meyer took office amid a strong recovery in tourism in Argentina. He and Presidential Spokesman Enrique Albistur sought to further promote the sector by announcing the Marca País ("Country Brand") initiative, a concept akin to "nation branding" which served the dual purpose of obtaining political support from well-known figures in Argentine sports.

Kirchner's wife and successor, President Cristina Fernández de Kirchner, had the Tourism Secretariat elevated to a cabinet-level post, and on July 1, 2010, Meyer was sworn in as the first Minister of Tourism.
