= George Mayer =

George Mayer may refer to:

- George Mayer (gymnast), American Olympic gymnast
- Jorge Mayer (1915–2010), Roman Catholic archbishop emeritus of the Archdiocese of Bahía Blanca, Argentina
- George A. Mayer (1917–2000), Wisconsin state senator
- George E. Mayer (born 1952), United States naval officer and aviator
- Christopher Mayer (American actor) (George Charles Mayer III, 1954–2011), American actor

== See also ==
- Georg (George) Mayer-Marton (1897–1960), Hungarian-Austrian Jewish artist
- George Meyer (disambiguation)
- Mayer (disambiguation)
