= Albert Myer =

Albert Myer may refer to:

- Albert J. Myer (1828–1880), surgeon and US Army officer
- Albert L. Myer (1846–1914), mayor of Ponce, Puerto Rico, 1899
- USNS Albert J. Myer, a U.S. Army cable ship named for Albert J. Myer, later long Navy service

== See also ==
- Albert Mayer (disambiguation)
- Albert Meyer (disambiguation)
