= Peter Meyer =

Peter Meyer may refer to:

== Sportspeople ==
- Peter Meyer (footballer, born 1940) (1940–2026), German footballer, striker
- Peter Meyer (footballer, born 1942), German footballer, goalkeeper
- Peter Meyer (figure skater), American figure skater in 1960 United States Figure Skating Championships
- Peter Meyer (skeleton racer), German skeleton racer in 2004 German Skeleton Championship

== Others ==
- Sir Peter Meyer (c. 1664–1728), English merchant
- Peter Meyer (astrophysicist) (1920–2002), German-born American astrophysicist
- Peter Meyer, German musician, member of the band Puhdys

== See also ==
- Peter Mayer (1936–2018), American independent publisher
- Peter Meijer (born 1988), American politician
