= Karl Möbius =

German zoologist (1825–1908)

Karl August Möbius
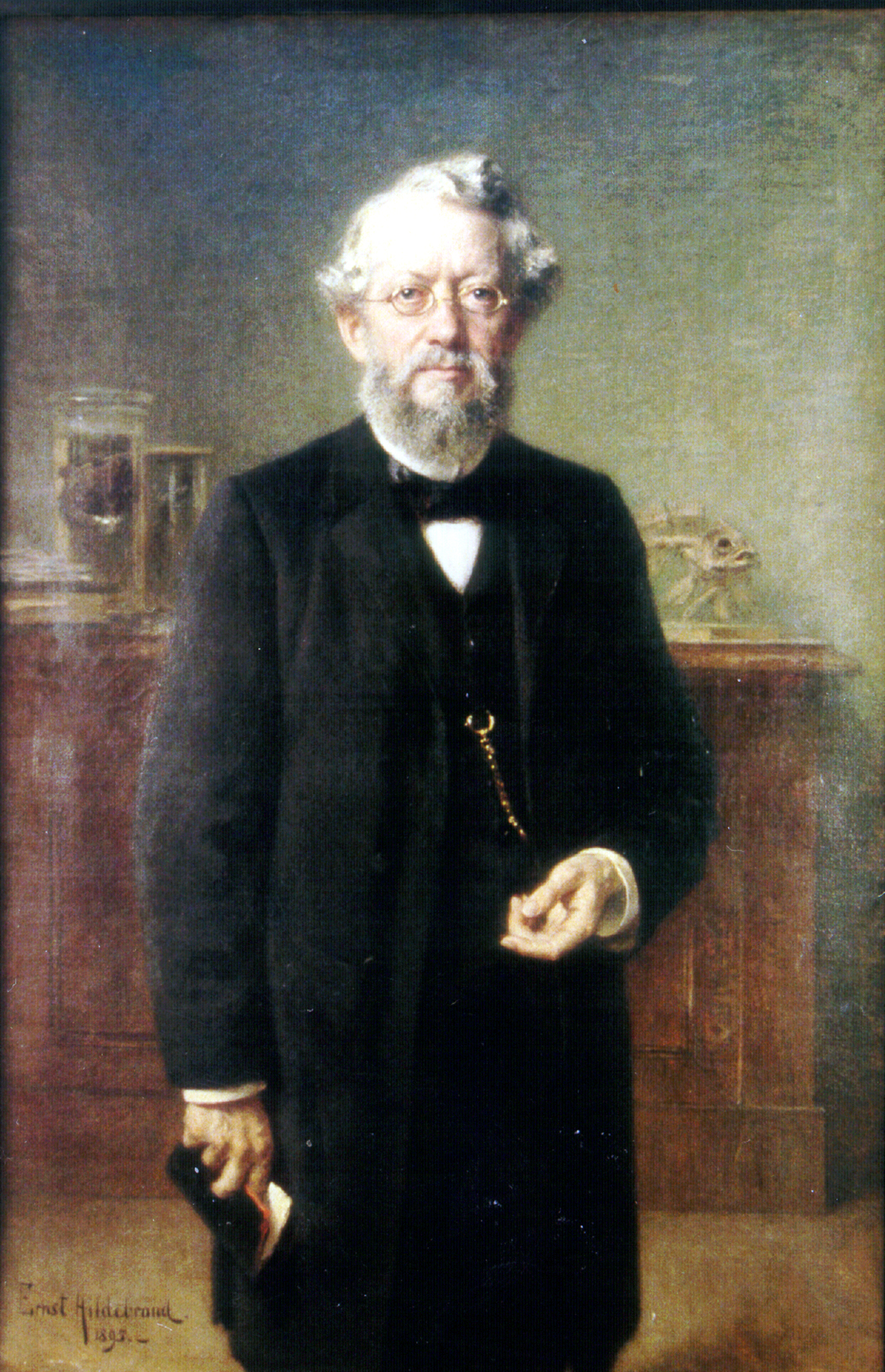
- Portrait by Ernst Hildebrand (1895)
- Born: 7 February 1825; Eilenburg, Prussia
- Died: 26 April 1908 (aged 83); Berlin, Germany
- Citizenship: German
- Education: Humboldt University; University of Halle
- Known for: Biocoenosis, ecology of oysters
- Scientific career
- Fields: Zoology, ecology
- Workplaces: University of Kiel; Natural History Museum of Berlin
- Doctoral students: Bernhard Tollens

Karl August Möbius (7 February 1825 in Eilenburg – 26 April 1908 in Berlin) was a German zoologist who was a pioneer in the field of marine ecology, founder of the Hamburg zoo and aquarium, the zoological institute at Kiel, and served as an influential director of the Natural History Museum in Berlin. He introduced the idea of a separation of research collections from the public natural history museum.

== Early life ==
Möbius was born in Eilenburg in Saxony, the son of wheelwright, Gottlob and Sophie née Kaps. His mother died when he was two years old and he was subsequently cared for by his stepmother Johanne Erdmuthe Hohehstein. At the age of four he attended primary school at the Bergschule Eilenburg, and at the age of 12 he was sent by his father to train as a teacher. In 1844 he passed the exams with distinction and began working as teacher in the Jacobsen school in Seesen, on the northwest edge of the Harz mountain range. In 1849, and encouraged by the writings of Alexander von Humboldt, he passed the Reifeprüfung needed to enter Berlin university. He began studying natural science and philosophy at the Natural History Museum of Berlin attending lectures by Johannes Müller, C. G. Ehrenberg, Eilhard Mitscherlich, E. H. Beyrich, and Hinrich Lichtenstein. He received a high school diploma as an external student of the Köllnisches Gymnasium in 1852. After he graduated, he received a recommendation from Lichtenstein and taught at the Gelehrtenschule des Johanneums in Hamburg from 1853 to 1868. He dealt with maths and natural sciences. At the end of the 1853 he received a doctorate in philosophy from the University of Halle with a dissertation on "Enthelminthes" which included the description of a new nematomorph species. He married Helene Pauline, sister of the philosopher Jürgen-Bona Meyer in 1855 and also joined the administration of the Hamburg Museum of Natural History.

== Hamburg and Kiel ==
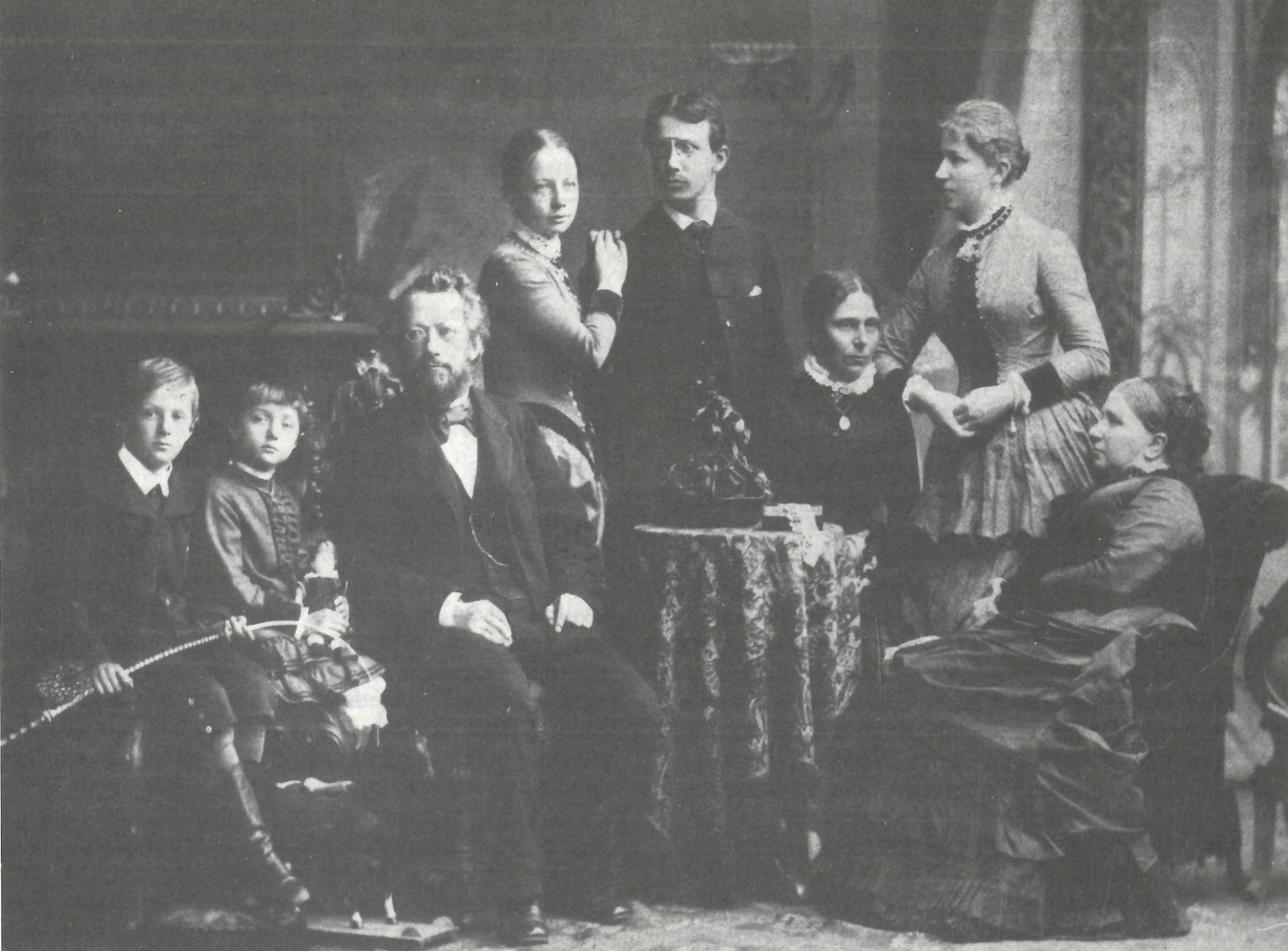
With family c. 1884. From right to left: wife Helene, daughter Maria, Marie Möbius (half-sister of Karl), son Otto, daughter Dorothea, Karl Möbius, two unidentified children.

Apart from his teaching work, Möbius was a member of the Naturwissenschaftliche Gesellschaft from 1853, and presided over the Zoologische Gesellschaft and the Naturwissenschaftliche Verein (1864-68). He was involved in founding the zoological garden (1862) and in 1863 he designed and opened the first German public sea water aquarium, inside Hamburg zoo. In 1868, he was appointed (Ordinarius) Professor of Zoology at the University of Kiel and the director of the Zoological Museum. Marine animals were among his main research interests and his first comprehensive work on the fauna of the Kieler Bucht already emphasized ecological aspects (Die Fauna der Kieler Bucht, co-authored with Heinrich Adolph Meyer, in two volumes published in 1865 and 1872 with financial support from Meyer). From 1859, he and Meyer had explored the marine fauna, sailing on Meyer's yacht, the Marie. They discovered an extremely rich spot called the Kiel fjord. In his work he talked about living communities of plants and animals at different depths and introduced the concept of “Lebensgemeinschaft” or “Biocönose”. which he defined in greater depth in his 1877 book Die Auster and die Austernwirtschaft. Between 1868 and 1870, Möbius was commissioned by the Ministry of Agricultural Affairs in Prussia to conduct research on the Bay of Kiel oyster beds. At the time, the oysters were being gathered from the natural beds and sold at expensive prices to the wealthy elite. Once the railroad was constructed and more opportunities for exportation arose, the demand for the oysters grew astronomically. In turn, the Ministry tasked Möbius with exploring the potential for further exploitation of the beds. Möbius's research resulted in two landmark publications: Über Austern- und Miesmuschelzucht und Hebung derselben an der norddeutschen Küste (1870, in English: On oyster and blue mussel farming in coastal areas of Northern Germany), and Die Auster und die Austernwirtschaft, in which he concluded that oyster farming was not a realistic option for Northern Germany. In this work he defined the term Biocönose more carefully and this would enter community ecological literature in English as "biocenose". He introduced the terms "eurytherm" and "stenotherm" according to the range of temperature tolerance and terms like "euryhalin" for salinity tolerance. He also conducted research surveys in the North and Baltic Seas. In 1874 he was chosen to join an expedition to the Mauritius for observations to be made on the transit of Venus. He visited the coral reefs around Mauritius and the Seychelles. He made collections of marine animals and also obtained bones of the dodo and solitaire. A near-complete skeleton of the solitaire was assembled from this material by Adolf Remane in 1923. In 1879 he served as rector of Kiel University. In 1881 he established a zoology institute and museum at Kiel to house the large collections that he had made. It had both a public side and a separate research collections section. The building was designed by Martin Gropius and Heino Schmieden.

== Berlin ==
In 1888 Möbius became the director of the Zoological Collections of the Natural History Museum of Berlin, and Professor of Systematic and Geographical Zoology at the Kaiser Wilhelm University, Berlin. Here too he separated the public museum from the research collections. He served as administrative director of the museum from 1896 to 1905. In 1901 he presided over the International Zoological Congress in Berlin. He retired in 1905 at the age of 80.

Throughout his career, Möbius supported educational institutions such as the Berlin Urania and efforts to spread knowledge about the natural sciences. He was interest in didactics and gave lectures to elementary school teachers. Among his students were Friedrich Junge, Friedrich Heincke, and Friedrich Dahl. Junge would write a natural history text titled Der Dorfteich als Lebensgemeinschaft "The Village Pond as a Biotic Community" (1885). Möbius had three children, Dorothea (1857), Maria (1859) and Otto (1861). He suffered from asthma in the winter of 1907-8 and died on 26 April 1908. He was buried at Berlin-Spandau. A street in Eilenburg was named after him in 1907.
