= Sclerometer =

Instrument used to measure the hardness of a material

The sclerometer, also known as the Turner-sclerometer (from Ancient Greek: σκληρός meaning "hard"), is an instrument used by metallurgists, material scientists and mineralogists to measure the scratch hardness of materials. It was invented in 1896 by Thomas Turner (1861–1951), the first Professor of metallurgy in Britain, at the University of Birmingham.

The Turner-Sclerometer test consists of measuring the amount of load required to make a scratch. In test a weighted diamond point is drawn, once forward and once backward, over the smooth surface of the material to be tested. The hardness number is the weight in grams required to produce a standard scratch. The scratch selected is one which is just visible to the naked eye as a dark line on a bright reflecting surface. It is also the scratch which can just be felt with the edge of a quill when the latter is drawn over the smooth surface at right angles to a series of such scratches produced by regularly increasing weights.

== See also ==
- Hardness – Measure of a material's resistance to localized plastic deformation
- Scleroscope – Instrument used to measure rebound hardness
- Tribometer – Instrument that measures friction and wear between surfaces
