= George Meyer (disambiguation) =

George Meyer (born 1956) is an American producer and writer.

George Meyer may also refer to:

- George Meyer (footballer) (1879–?), who played for FC Barcelona
- George Meyer (baseball) (1909–1992), American baseball player
- George von Lengerke Meyer (1858–1918), U. S. Postmaster General and Secretary of the Navy
- George Meyer (soccer coach), American soccer coach
- George W. Meyer (1884–1959), American Tin Pan Alley songwriter

== See also ==
- Georg Meyer (disambiguation)
- George Mayer (disambiguation)
- George Myers (disambiguation)
- George Meyers (1865–1943), American baseball player
- Meyer (surname)
