= George Myers =

George Myers may refer to:

- George Hewitt Myers (1875–1957), American forester and philanthropist
- George Myers (builder) (1803–1875), builder best known for his work with the architect Augustus Pugin
- George S. Myers (1905–1985), American ichthyologist
- George S. Myers (judge) (1881–1940), American lawyer and politician in Ohio
- George Myers (baseball) (1860–1926), American Major League Baseball catcher
- George Myers (hotelier), Bahamian businessman
- George W. Myers (1864–1931), American astronomer, mathematician and progressive educator
- George A. Myers (1859–1930), member of the Ohio House of Representatives

== See also ==
- George Meyer (disambiguation)
- George Meyers (1865–1943), American baseball player
