= Jack Myers =

Jack Myers may refer to:

- Jack Myers (biologist) (1913–2006), American molecular biologist and writer of popular science
- Jack Myers (American football) (1924–2020), American football player
- Jack Elliott Myers (1941–2009), Texas poet laureate
- Jack Myers (media ecologist), American media ecologist

== See also ==
- John Myers (disambiguation)
