= Carl Svante Hallbeck =

Swedish illustrator and painter

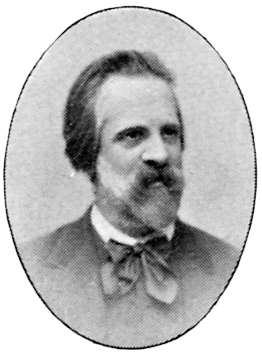
- Born: 14 April 1826; Gothenburg, Sweden
- Died: 17 December 1897 (aged 71); Everett, Massachusetts, United States
- Occupations: illustrator and painter

Carl Svante Hallbeck (14 April 1826 – 17 December 1897) was a Swedish illustrator and painter.

== Biography ==
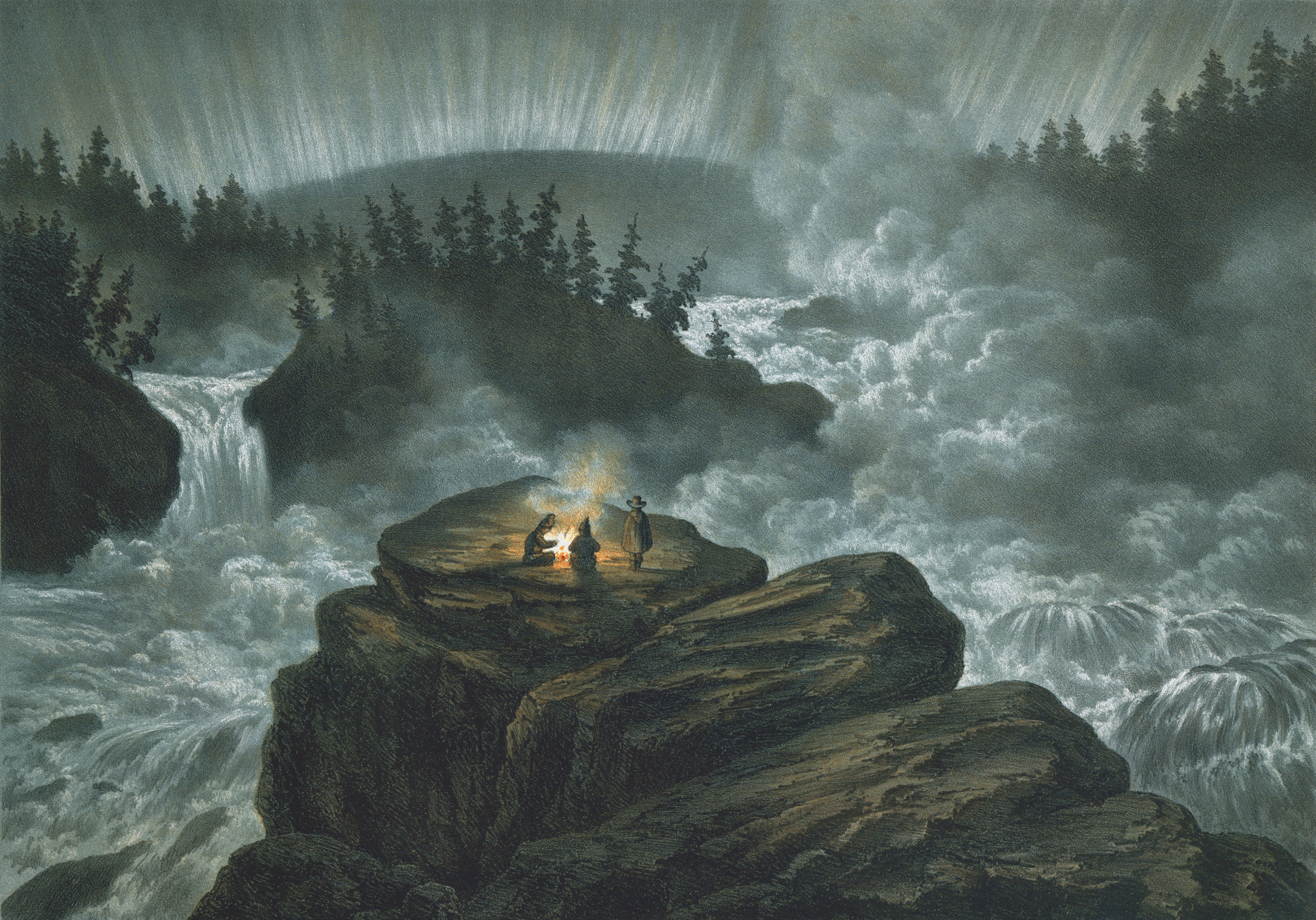
The waterfall Harsprånget (1856)

Hallbeck worked as a shop assistant until 1846 when he began to study at the Royal Danish Academy of Fine Arts in Copenhagen. After completing his studies, he moved back to Sweden in 1851. For a long time, Hallberg was one of the most frequently hired artists for woodcuts in Swedish, Danish and German magazines and books.

Among other things, he worked for Svenska Familj-Journalen, the calendar Svea and Ny Illustrerad Tidning, in which he contributed during the founding in 1865. In 1887, he moved to the United States, where he painted a few watercolour paintings while still sending literary contributions to the Swedish press under the pseudonym Svante.
