= Kurt Meyer (disambiguation) =

Kurt Meyer (1910–1961) was an officer in the Waffen-SS

Kurt Meyer may also refer to:

- Kurt Meyer (Lucerne) (born 1944), member of the cantonal government of Lucerne, Switzerland, 1995–2005
- Kurt Meyer (sport shooter) (born 1933), German Olympic shooter
- Kurt Meyer (architect) (1922–2014), American architect
- Kurt Heinrich Meyer (1883–1952), German chemist

== See also ==
- Kurt Meier (born 1962), Swiss bobsledder
- Curt Meyer (1919–2011), German mathematician
- Curt Meyer-Clason (1910–2012), German writer and translator
- Curt Meier (born 1953), American politician
