= Bachmayer =

Bachmayer is a German surname. Notable people with the surname include:

- Georg Bachmayer (1913–1945), German SS-Hauptsturmführer
- Werner Bachmayer (born 1960), Austrian sprint canoeist

== See also ==
- Bachmeier
- Peter "Beda" Bachmayer, drummer for the band ConFused5
- Bachmayer, a character in Max Payne (series)
