= Albert Merz =

German Christadelphian executed for refusing to bear arms (died 1941)

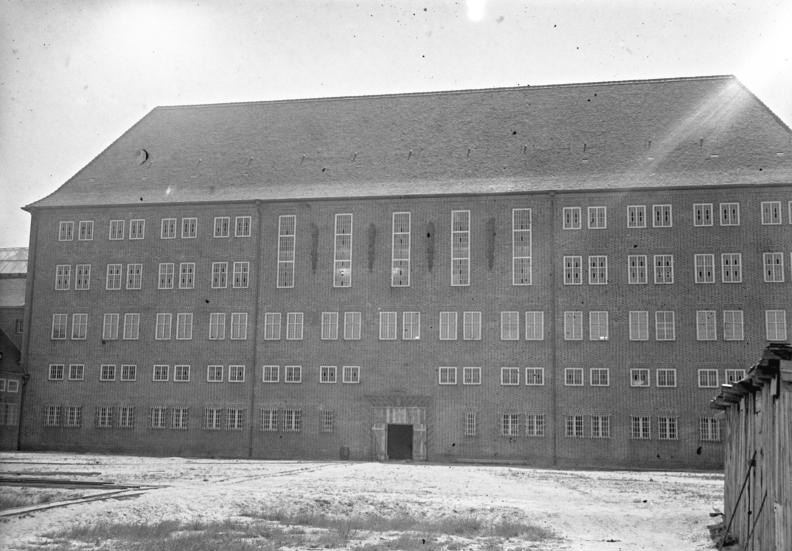
Brandenburg-Görden Prison (1931)

Albert Merz (died April 3, 1941) was a German Christadelphian who was executed for refusing to bear arms in the Second World War.

Albert Merz belonged to the Merz family of southern Germany who were leading members of what was then known as the Urchristen ("Primitive Christian"), which was the German name for the Christadelphian church in Germany. The Urchristen church had its German origins due in part to the efforts of a Stuttgart tradesman Albert Maier who had travelled to the United States before World War 1 and had been introduced to Christadelphian beliefs while residing in America. Albert Maier subsequently joined the Christadelphian church there and then returned to Germany to the Stuttgart area before start of hostilities. His efforts to introduce others to Christadelphian teaching was instrumental in establishing the Christadelphian church in southern Germany.

After the Nazi rise to power in 1933, the Christadelphian church, or as they were then known - the Urchristen, attracted particular attention for their pro-Jewish views and their belief that God would restore the Jews to a national homeland in Israel.

The first member of the Merz family to be incarcerated was August Merz who was condemned to a concentration camp for religious and political prisoners in 1938, where he survived six years until the camp was liberated in 1945. The next was Rudolf Merz who was committed to an insane asylum for his pacifist views. He too survived. Although all three brothers were conscientious objectors, only Albert received the death penalty. The different fates of the three brothers show how Nazi treatment of objectors changed in World War II.

Albert Merz was called up for military service in early 1941, but immediately refused on the basis of conscientious objection as his brothers had done before him. He was sent to the Brandenburg-Görden Prison where he was executed on April 3, 1941.

He wrote a farewell letter to his parents and siblings containing the poem:

"Be what you are, with everything you have.
Not only the flower, that which is bright
but also the leaf, the unadorned,
has significance for the wreath (crown)."

His reference to a "crown" (German Kranz, laurel crown) is an allusion to Christadelphian belief in the resurrection of the dead and 2 Timothy 4:8.

Henceforth there is laid up for me a crown of righteousness, which the Lord, the righteous judge, shall give me at that day: and not to me only, but unto all them also that love his appearing. "
