= Johan Fredrik Meyer =

German-Swedish engraver and printer

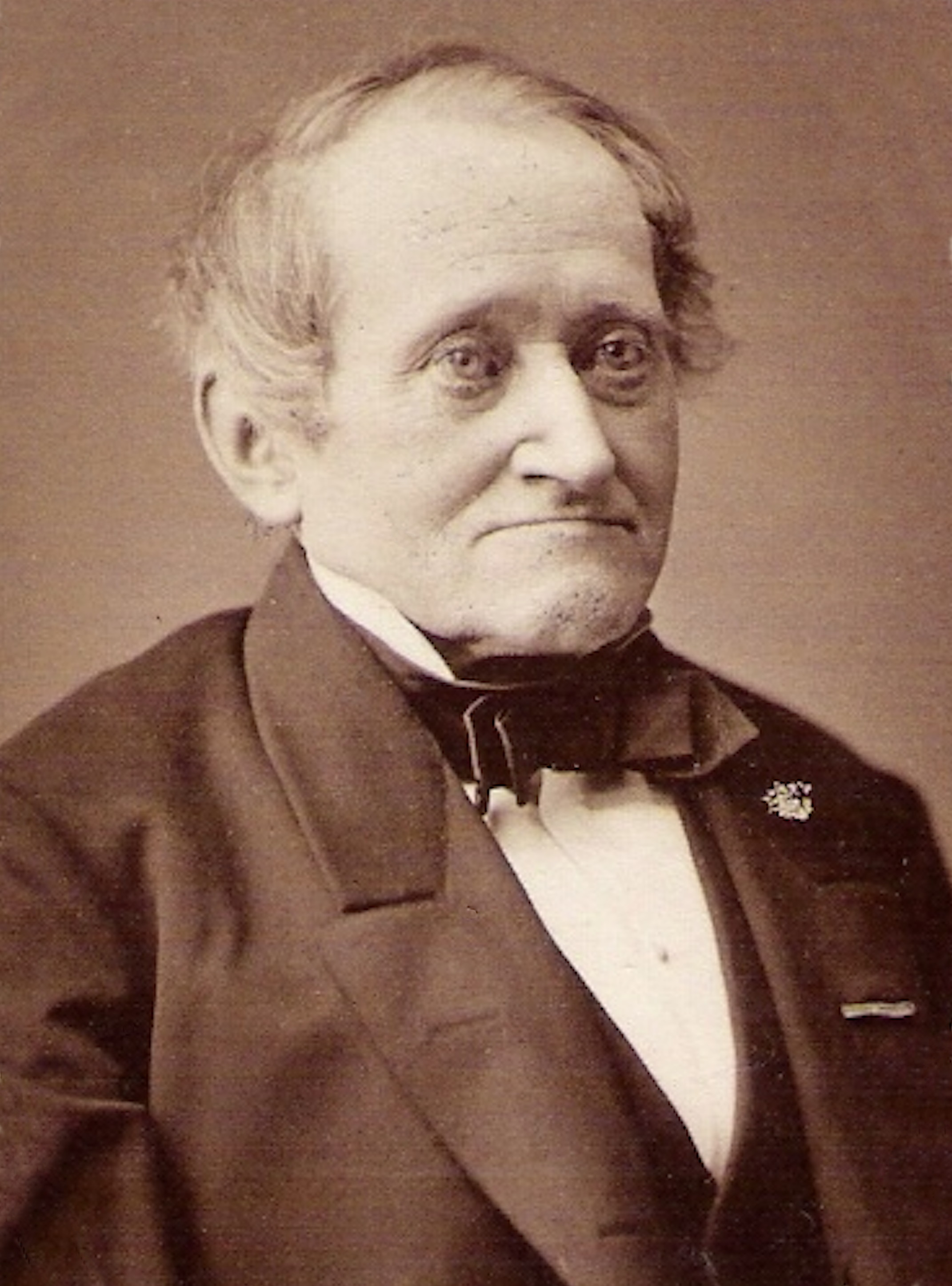
Johan Fredrik Meyer (c.1870), by Johannes Jaeger

Johan Fredrik Meyer (6 January 1806, Havelberg - 17 December 1893, Stockholm) was a German-Swedish engraver and printer. Three of his sons were also artists and craftsmen; Otto Meyer, a metal caster, Wilhelm Meyer, an engraver, and Fritz Meyer, a lithographer.

== Biography ==
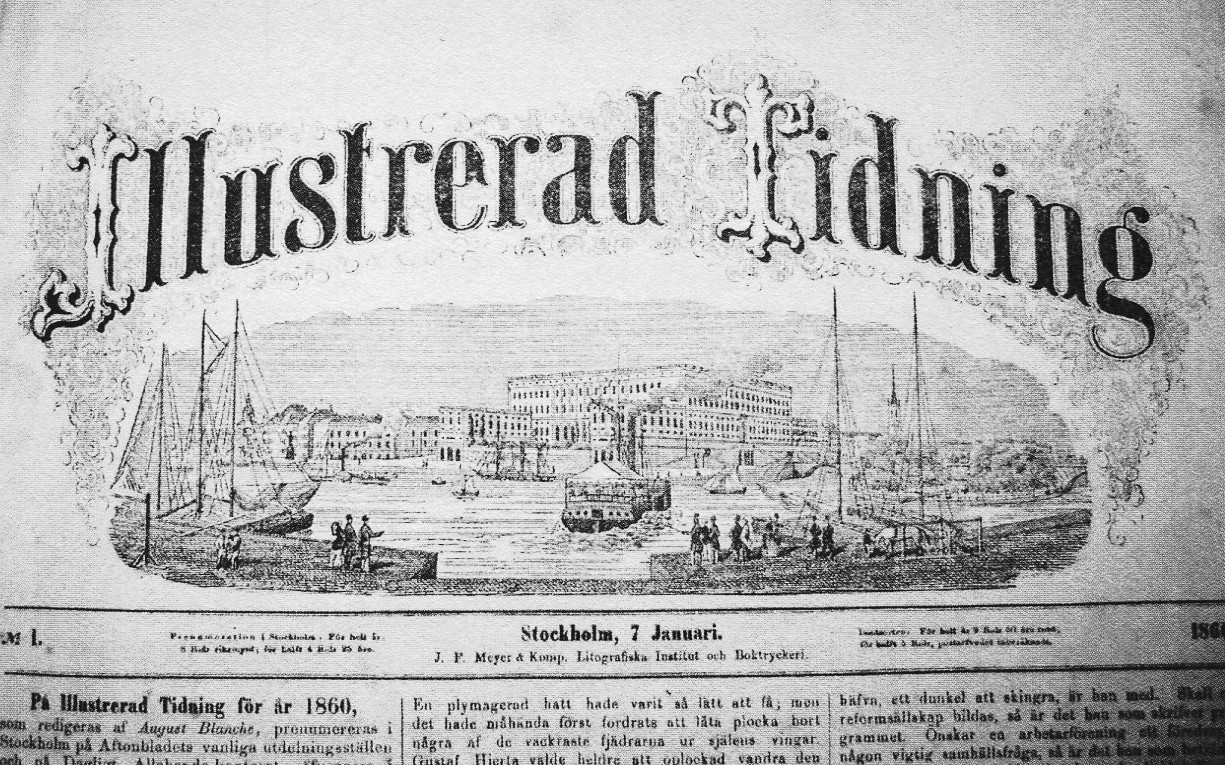
Illustrerad Tidning, 7 January 1860

He was born to Johann Friedrich Meyer, a journeyman mason, and his wife Catharina Elisabeth. In 1822, after being given private lessons in free-hand drawing, he was able to begin formal studies at the Academy of Arts, Berlin, aged only sixteen. After completing his studies, he developed an interest in lithography, which was then a relatively new technique.

He moved between Bremen and Hamburg, making drawings and practicing his new skills. In 1839, while in Hamburg, he married Catharina Therese Rosenthal (1814–1896). They had eleven children.

In 1840, as a result of his contact with Swedes, he decided to go to Sweden. He went together with a friend named Julius Ortgies to see if there was a market for lithographic printing. The following year, they established "J. F. Meyer & Co.", partly financed by Ortgies' father. In 1842, they had a falling out and Ortgies left the company.

Contacts with influential people in court and the academies guaranteed the company's success. These included Jöns Jacob Berzelius and Fredrik Blom, who recommended Meyer to King Karl XIV Johan. This resulted in commissions for printed royal portraits, maps, stationery, menus, brochures, posters, program leaflets and the like. He soon titled himself the "Royal Court Printer".

In 1848, he produced the very first color lithographs in Sweden; six plates for the book "Chinas handel, industri och statsförfattning" (China's trade, industry and state constitution), published by Carl Fredrik Liljevalch.

During the Crimean War he printed maps and portraits for Rudolf Wall, the publisher of Friskytten, a short-lived daily newspaper. A visit to the war zone, as a reporter, prompted him to start his own newspaper. Through a collaboration with Per Erik Svedbom, a well-known educator, the weekly Illustrerad Tidning was created in 1855. Although not the first illustrated periodical in Sweden, it was the first to be published regularly.

He acquired a competitor in 1865; the Ny Illustrerad Tidning, published by Norstedts förlag. By 1867, he was in financial trouble. Despite efforts to attract more subscribers he was forced to declare bankruptcy. He continued to print books, and still received the occasional commission from the Royal Court. In 1884, he retired and closed down his business.

== Selected works ==
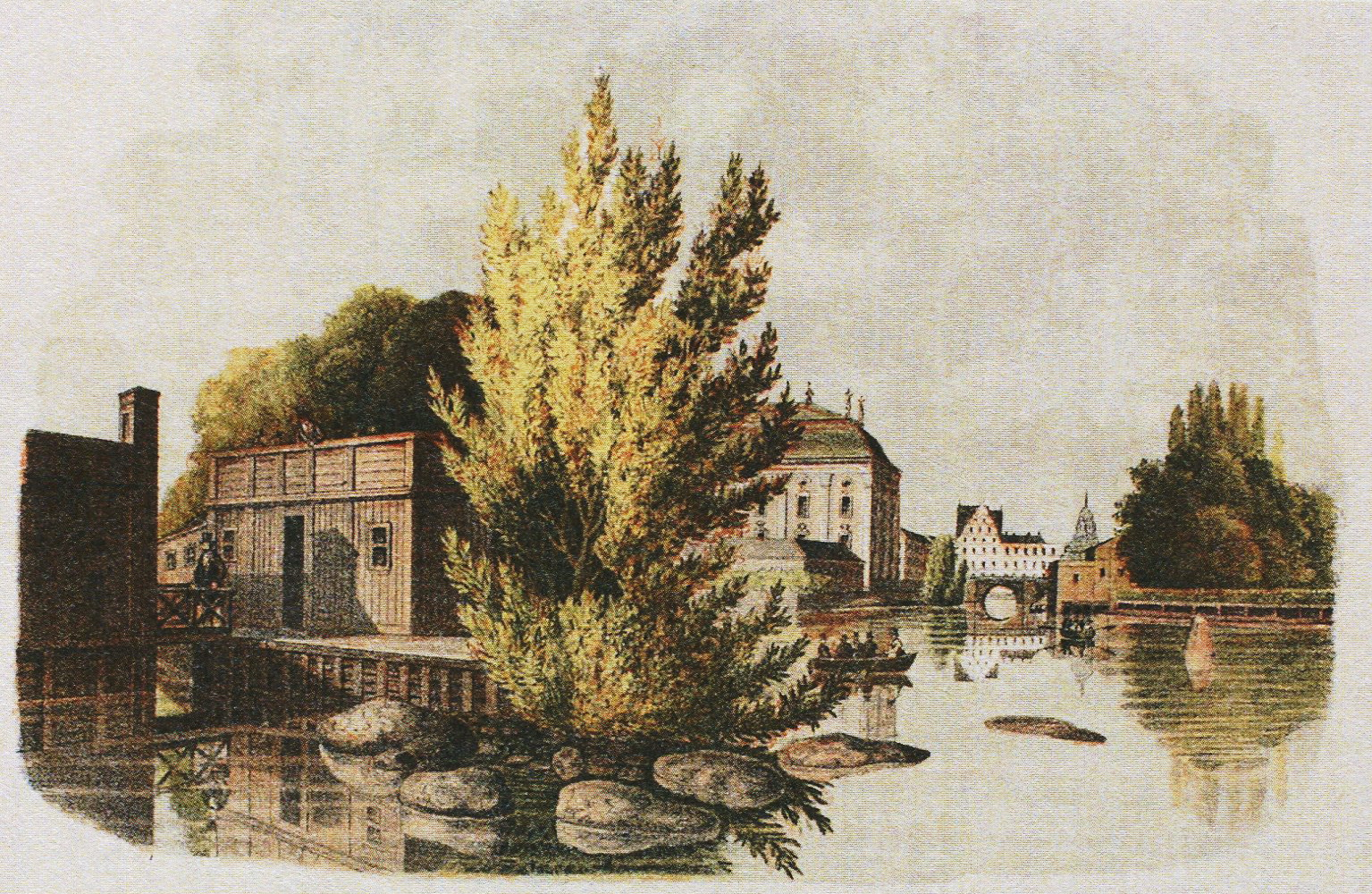
The House of Nobility on Strömsborg

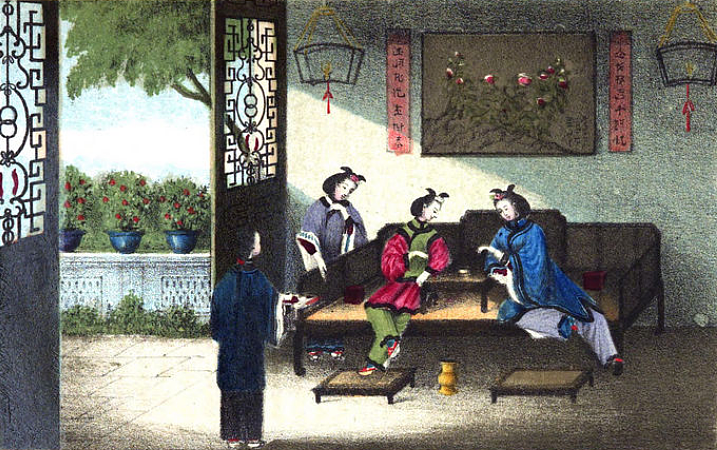
Chinese Room with Three Young Ladies

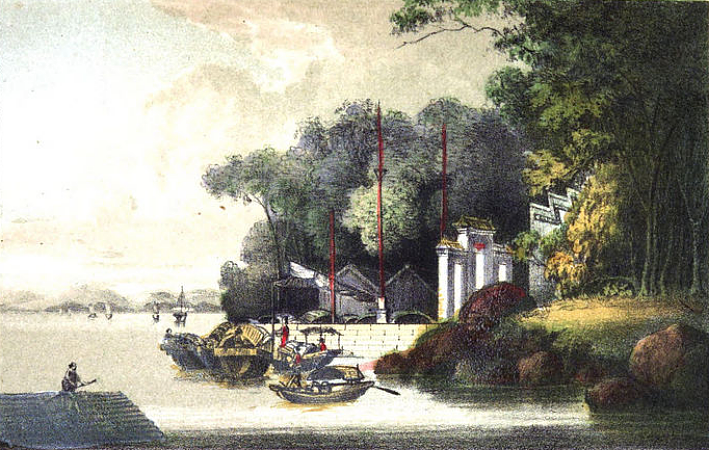
Temple in Macao

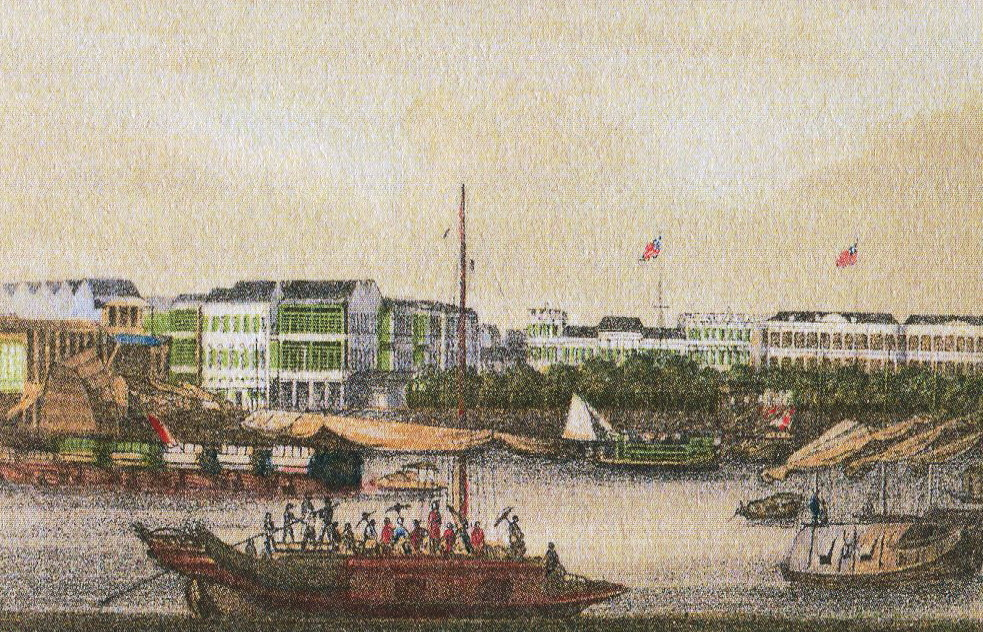
Foreign Factories in Canton
