= Johan Meyer (disambiguation) =

Johan Meyer (died 1901) was a German-born pioneer of the Queensland Gold Coast.

Johan Mayer may also refer to:

- Johan Meyer (footballer) (born 2004), Danish footballer
- Johan Meyer (rugby union) (born 1993), South African rugby union player
- Johan Fredrik Meyer (1806–1893), German-Swedish engraver and printer
