= Thomas Turner (metallurgist) =

British metallurgist

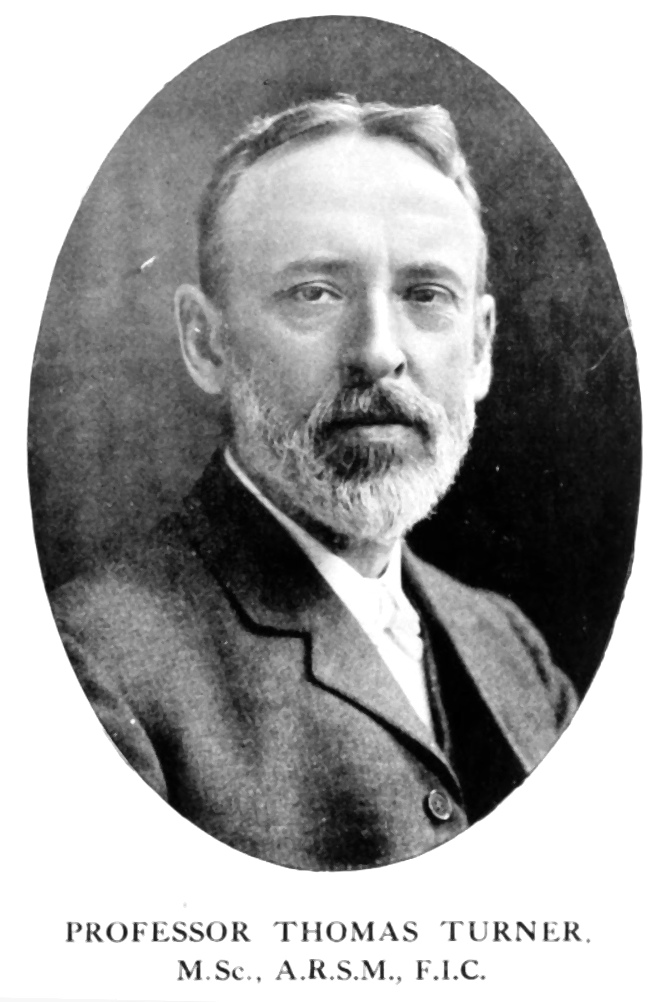
Thomas Turner, A.R.S.M

Thomas Turner Sc., A.R.S.M., F.R.I.C. (Birmingham, 1861–1951) was the first Professor of Metallurgy in Britain, at the University of Birmingham. The University was created in 1900 and the department founded in 1902. He was instrumental in the early development of the sclerometer for testing hardness of metals. He retired in 1926. He was also a leading member of the Christadelphian church.

Turner was born in Ladywood, Birmingham in 1861. He married Christian Smith of Edinburgh in 1887 and had two sons and two daughters. He studied metallurgy at the Royal School of Mines in London, and won the annual De la Beche medal awarded in memory of the school's founder. Turner was demonstrator at Mason Science College from 1883, then 1887 lecturer in metallurgy, a new science that "was to develop greatly under his guidance during the next forty years." From 1894-1902 he was Director of Technical Instruction to Staffordshire County Council, but in 1902 was chosen as the first Professor of Metallurgy in the newly established University of Birmingham. He retired in 1926 but continued to publish and lecture.

His most notable work was seminal research in the influence of silicon in cast iron. He was a founder member of, and later president of the Institute of Metals, vice president of the Iron and Steel Institute, and on the Advisory Committee of the Imperial Institute. On 13 December 1916, he was among three members of the Institute of Metals (alongside Sir George Beilby and Professor Alfred Kirby Huntington) to propose the election of Georgina Elizabeth Kermode. Kermode became the first female member of the Institute of Metals. He was awarded the Bessemer Gold Medal of the Iron and Steel Institute in 1925.

Turner was active in the Christadelphian movement and for many years was first assistant editor, with Joseph Hadley, then editor of the Fraternal Visitor magazine of the Suffolk Street ecclesia. In this function he was also involved in support of the Gemeinde in Germany, corresponding with Albert Maier and Ludwig von Gerdtell. As a hymn writer he contributed to his church's hymnal.

== Works ==
- The Metallurgy of Iron and Steel (1895)
- Practical Metallurgy: an introductory course for general students (1919)

== See also ==
- Sclerometer, an instrument invented in 1896 by Thomas Turner to measure the scratch hardness of metallic alloys and other materials.
