= Thomas Mair =

Thomas Mair may refer to:

- Thomas Mair (minister) (1701–1768), eighteenth century Scottish minister
- Thomas Mair (born 1963), British criminal; see murder of Jo Cox
- Thomas Mair, co-founder of Mair, Inglis and Evatt

== See also ==
- Thomas Maier, author, journalist, and television producer.
- Thomas Mayer (disambiguation)
