= Ernst Meyer =

Ernst Meyer may refer to:

- Ernst Heinrich Friedrich Meyer (1791–1858), German botanist
- Ernst Meyer (painter) (1797–1861), Danish painter
- Ernst Meyer (Swedish politician) (1847–1925), Swedish politician
- Ernst Meyer (German politician) (1887–1930), German Communist Party leader
- Ernst Meyer (historian) (1898–1975), German ancient historian
- Ernst Hermann Meyer (1905–1988), German composer and musicologist

== See also ==
- Ernst Walter Mayr (1904–2005), German evolutionary biologist
- de:Ernst Meyer, a longer list in German Wiki
