= Heinrich Adolph Meyer =

German manufacturer and oceanographer (1822–1889)

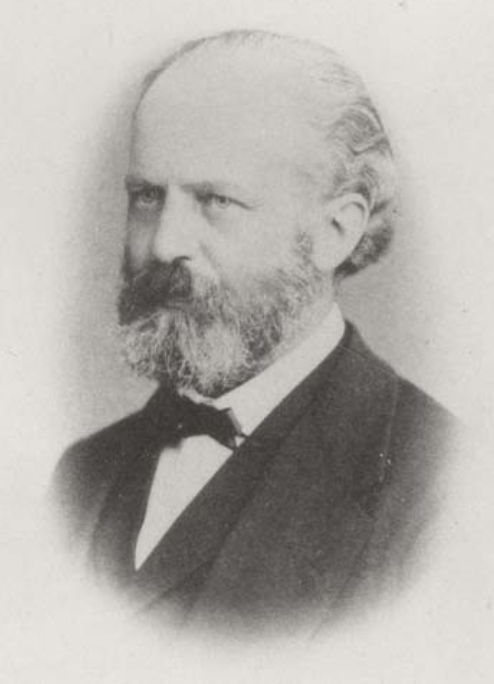

Heinrich Adolph Meyer (11 September 1822 – 1 June 1889) was a German factory owner, ivory trader, and ocean researcher. He supported the marine biologist Karl Möbius and conducted studies on the salinity and temperature of the Baltic and North Seas.

== Life and work ==
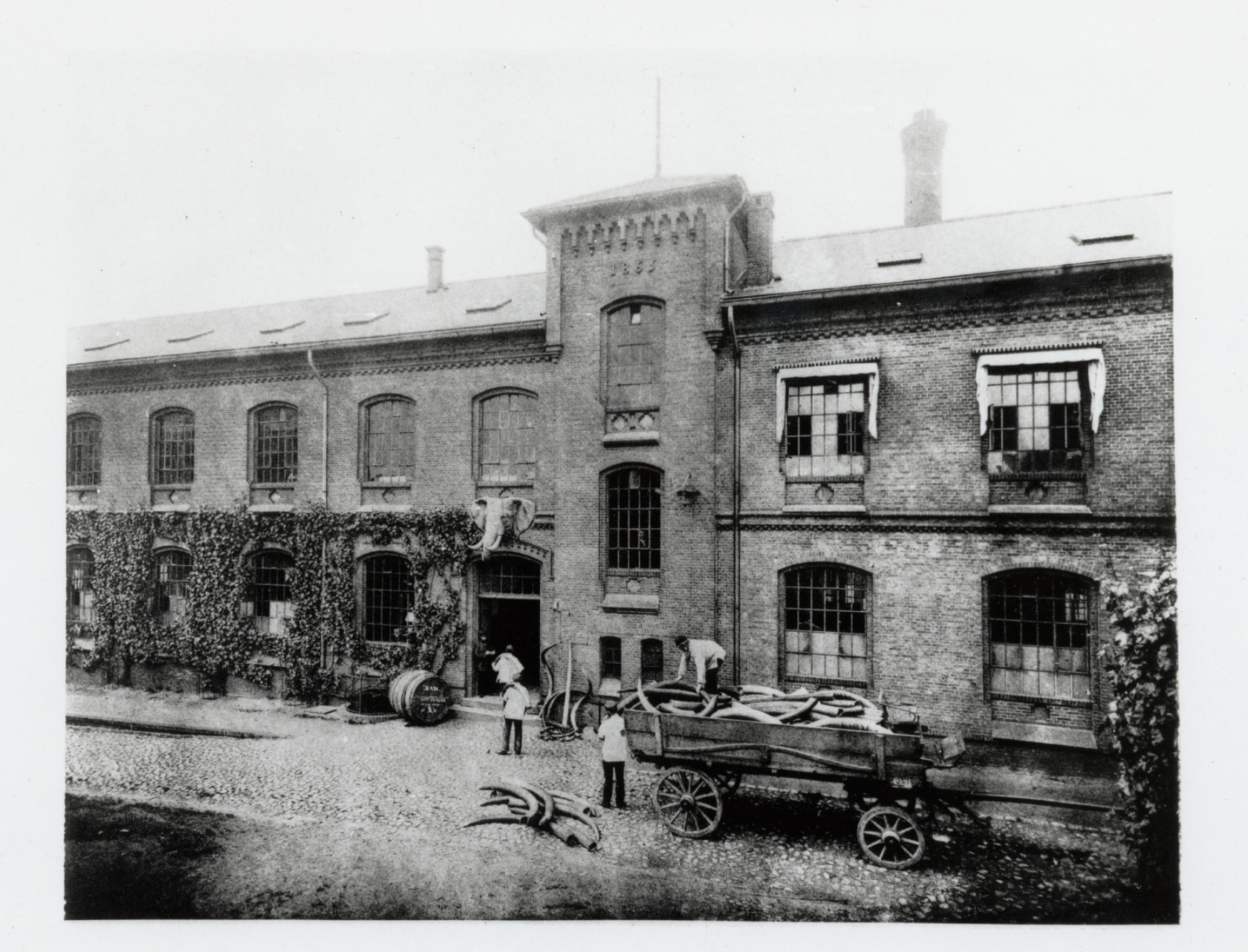
Meyer's ivory trade company in Hamburg, c. 1899

Meyer was born in Hamburg to walking stick and chair manufacturer Heinrich Christian (1797–1848) and Agathe Margarethe (1794–1833). His father was nicknamed as "Stockmeyer" (Walking Stick Meyer). The company also traded in related materials including ivory. He worked with his father's company and established a factory in the United States in 1841 that processed whale-bones and baleen for the manufacture of corsets. He married Marie Louise Toberentz and after the death of his father he and his brother-in-law managed the Hamburg factory. The invention of vulcanized hard rubber threatened whalebone as substitute so Meyer obtained the European license for hard rubber production in 1851. In 1854, his brother H.C. Meyer Jr. moved the walking stick factory to Harburg, Hanover. In 1864 Meyer, left his father's company and founded a company to import ivory from Africa to produce ivory products in Germany. Hamburg imported about 182,000 kilogram of ivory in 1890, priced at around 25 marks per kilogram. The bulk of this was traded by Meyer who marketed his company as the largest ivory trader in the world. He was selling 70,000 ivory billiard balls a year in the 1880s. Otto Gerdau was an agent in New York for the company. In 1888, the African ivory agent of Meyer, G. W. H. Westendarp was threatened by an uprising in German East Africa and he had the German army (Schutztruppe) under Hermann Wissmann help suppress it.

Meyer was a member of the assembly for Hamburg in 1848 and 1849 and for Schleswig-Holstein from 1877 to 1881. Although without a degree, he had an interest in science. He founded a circle of marine scientists at Kiel and began to conduct systematic studies on the Baltic Sea from the late 1850s. This circle included the marine biologist Karl Möbius, the physiologist Victor Hensen, and the physicist Gustav Karsten. In 1862 he used his yacht Marie to conduct studies in the Kiel Bight. He set up observation stations and developed measuring instruments to examine temperature at various depths. He conducted surveys of marine organisms along with Karl Möbius and funded his work and publications on the biology of Kiel Bay. He developed a method for transporting herring eggs by cooling them. He was a board member of the Hamburg zoo and was associated with the establishment of the aquarium in Hamburg. He was awarded an honorary doctorate by the University of Kiel in 1866.
