= Jacob Meyer =

Jacob Meyer may refer to:

- Jacob Meyer (rower) (born 1969), Danish silver medallist at the 1993 World Rowing Championships
- Jacob O. Meyer (1934–2010), founder of the Assemblies of Yahweh
- Jacob Gibble Meyer, former President of Elizabethtown College
