= Adolf Meyer =

Adolf Meyer may refer to:

- Adolf Bernhard Meyer (1840–1911), German anthropologist and ornithologist
- Adolf Meyer (actor) (1840–1890), German stage actor and theatre director
- Adolf Meyer (psychiatrist) (1866–1950), Swiss psychiatrist
- Adolf Meyer (architect) (1881–1929), German architect

== See also ==
- Adolf Mayer (1843–1942), German chemist
- Adolph de Meyer (1868–1946), photographer
