= Alfred Meyer (writer) =

German writer

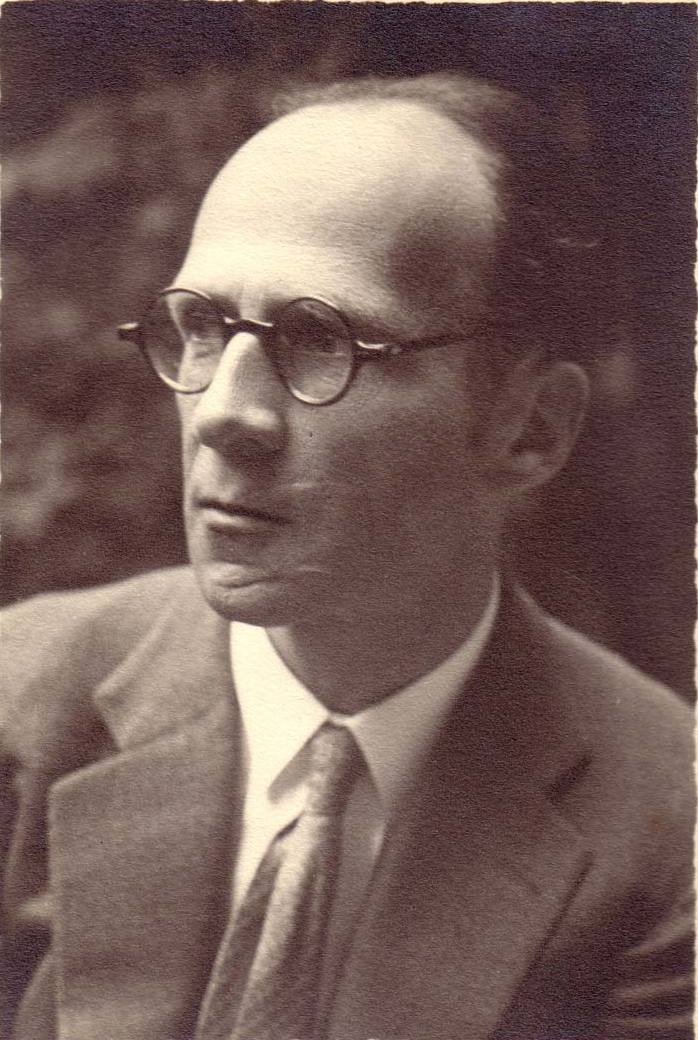
- Meyer in 1929
- Born: 4 August 1882; Schwerin, Germany
- Died: 9 January 1956 (aged 73); Lübeck, Germany
- Occupation: Writer

Alfred Meyer (4 August 1882 – 9 January 1956) was a German writer and publisher. His work was part of the literature event in the art competition at the 1932 Summer Olympics.

== Biography ==
Meyer was born in Schwerin, Germany in 1882. He had many pseudonyms, including "Munkepunke," and he wrote over 100 books in his lifetime.

In 1933, Meyer swore loyalty to Adolf Hitler. In 1937, Meyer joined the Nazi Party.

Meyer died at age 73 in Lübeck, Germany.
