= Peter Meyer (footballer, born 1942) =

German footballer (born 1942)

Personal information
- Date of birth: 7 September 1942 (age 84)
- Height: 1.74 m (5 ft 9 in)
- Position: Goalkeeper

Youth career
- 1959–1961: Motor Zwickau

Senior career*
Years	Team	Apps	(Gls)
1961–1965	Motor Zwickau	64	(0)
1965–1966	ASG Vorwärts Frankenberg		(0)
1966–1972	Dynamo Dresden	22	(0)
1972–1984	Motor Werdau	250+	(0)
Total		336+	(0)

International career
1961	East Germany U18	4	(0)
- * Club domestic league appearances and goals

Peter Meyer (born 7 September 1942), nicknamed Meyer-Perle, is a retired East German association footballer who played as a goalkeeper.

He played for Motor Zwickau and Dynamo Dresden in the Oberliga, the top football division in East Germany. With Motor Zwickau, he won the East German Football Cup in 1963. Meyer was also a four-time junior international player.

== Career ==
Meyer joined a sports association, the junior team of Motor Zwickau in 1959 at the age of 16.

In 1961, he was selected for the junior national team and made his first of four junior international appearances on 19 February 1961, in Dresden against Austria (2:2). In the 1962-63 Oberliga season, he replaced Heinz Franke as the starting goalkeeper, appearing in 20 out of 26 possible league matches.

On 1 May 1963, he won his only title after a 3:0 victory in the cup final against Chemie Zeitz. The following year, the 1.74 m tall Meyer missed only one league match and also played in both of Zwickau's second round of that season's European Cup Winners' Cup matches against MTK Budapest (1:0, 0:2). By May 1965, Meyer had made a total of 64 Oberliga appearances.

He was then drafted into military service which meant being forced to play for one of the ASV Vorwärts-affiliated clubs. During his one and a half years with ASG Vorwärts Frankenberg he continued to play football in the third-tier Bezirksliga.

After his military service, Meyer joined Oberliga club Dynamo Dresden in 1966, which needed a replacement for its previous starting goalkeeper, Peter Noske. Meyer made his first Oberliga appearance for Dresden on matchday 6 of the 1966–67 season. It remained his only top-flight appearance that season, as coach Manfred Fuchs preferred the equally aged Manfred Kallenbach. Meyer continued to serve as a backup the following season and was mainly used in the second team, which played at the time in the third-tier Bezirksliga.

At the end of the 1967–68 season, in which Meyer played five Oberliga matches, Dynamo Dresden were relegated to the DDR-Liga. There, Meyer broke through in the first team, making 28 out of 30 possible league appearances that season. Dynamo achieved immediate promotion back to the top flight, and Meyer started the new 1969-70 Oberliga season as the number one goalkeeper in Dresden. However, from matchday 18, he had to give up his starting spot to Kallenbach and was not used in the first team again. Since Meyer did not play in the Oberliga after this, his total remained at 64 top-flight appearances for Motor Zwickau and 22 for Dynamo Dresden.

When the young Claus Boden established himself as the second goalkeeper behind Kallenbach in 1972, Meyer left Dresden in the summer of 1972 and, at nearly 30 years old, transferred to DDR-Liga club Motor Werdau. There, he played in goal for over 250 DDR-Liga matches until 1984, having narrowly missed promotion to the Oberliga in 1976.

== Honours ==
- Dynamo Dresden
  - 1 x East German Champion: 1971
  - 1 x East German Cup Winner: 1971
- Motor Zwickau
  - 1 x East German Cup Winner: 1963

== Bibliography ==
- Hanns Leske (2007). Enzyklopädie des DDR-Fußballs [Encyclopedia of East German Football]. Göttingen: Verlag Die Werkstatt. ISBN 978-3-89533-556-3.
- Andreas Baingo; Michael Horn (2003). Die Geschichte der DDR-Oberliga [The History of the East German Oberliga]. Göttingen: Verlag Die Werkstatt. ISBN 3-89533-428-6.
- Uwe Nuttelmann, ed. (2007). DDR-Oberliga. 1962–1991 [East German Oberliga. 1962–1991]. Jade: Eigenverlag. ISBN 978-3-930814-33-6.
- Norbert Peschke; Dieter Völkel; Frank Kruczynski (2012). Fußball-Sport-Verein Zwickau (ed.). Die Geschichte des FSV Zwickau. von Wespenstichen und Haldenbeben [The History of FSV Zwickau: From Wasp Stings and Pit Tremors]. Wilkau-Haßlau: Zschiesche. ISBN 978-3-9815145-0-6.
