= Bachmeier =

Surname list

Bachmeier is a German surname. Notable people with it include:

- Adolph Bachmeier (1937–2016), American-Romanian soccer player
- Hank Bachmeier (born 1999), American football quarterback
- Jacob Bachmeier (born 1998), American politician
- Marianne Bachmeier (1950–1996), West German vigilante killer

== See also ==
- Bachmayer
