= Mary Meyer =

Mary Meyer may refer to:

- Mary C. Meyer, American statistician
- Mary Fisher Meyer (1878–1975), Australian painter, arts patron and collector
- Mary Jones Meyer, poker player
- Mary Meyer Corporation, stuffed animal and toy company in Vermont
- Mary Meyer Gilmore (born 1947), American former politician
- Mary Pinchot Meyer (1920–1964), American murder victim, wife of CIA official Cord Meyer
