= John H. Myers =

American businessman

John H. Myers (born July 2, 1945) is an American businessman.

== Education and early life ==
Myers was raised in Richmond Hill, Queens by Jack & Edna (née Stroudhoff) Myers. He is also the brother of David Myers. He graduated from Wagner College with a bachelor's degree in Mathematics in 1967. He then attended and graduated from Navy OCS, and served two tours in South Vietnam.

== Career ==
He is the former president and chief executive officer of General Electric Asset Managements, and the current chairman at ForstmannLeff, a buyout firm, "Mr. Myers joins ForstmannLeff after retiring in July as President and chief executive officer of GE Asset Management, a position he held since 1987. In that role, he led the firm's transformation from GE's corporate pension office into a leader in third-party institutional asset management that grew from $50 billion to $200 billion in assets, including a significant amount of external capital.

Mr. Myers served in several leadership capacities during his 37-year tenure with GE." At GE, he had previously been a backer of that company. He is on the board of directors for Hilton Hotels Corp. "In addition to serving as a Director of Hilton, Myers is a member of the boards of directors of GE Capital, Pebble Beach Company, and Warburg Pincus Advisory Board. He also is a trustee of Wagner College and serves on the pension managers advisory committee of the New York Stock Exchange."
