= Frank Meyer =

Frank Meyer may refer to:

- Frank Meyer (political philosopher) (1909–1972), American libertarian political philosopher
- Sir Frank Meyer, 2nd Baronet (1886–1935), British businessman and Conservative Party Member of Parliament
- Frank Nicholas Meyer (1875–1918), United States Department of Agriculture explorer
- Frank A. Meyer (born 1944), Swiss journalist

== See also ==
- Francis Blackwell Mayer (1827–1899), American genre painter
