= Anthony Meyer =

Anthony Meyer may refer to:

- Anthony Meyer (actor) (born 1947), English actor
- Sir Anthony Meyer, 3rd Baronet (1920–2004), British politician
