= Albert Maier =

Albert Maier (1860 Reutlingen – 1944 in Kornwestheim) was the founder of the German Christadelphians.

== Biography ==
Maier had been a Methodist, but had become disillusioned with religion. Aged 22, he emigrated to Oregon USA and where he found work as an ironworker. His employer in Oregon, Thomas Rogers, was a Christadelphian who, seeing Maier distributing atheistic literature signed ‘a seeker after Truth’, invited him to his home. There they spent long hours discussing the Bible, and Maier realised that he had found what he was looking for. He was baptized by Rogers in November 1885.

Maier returned to Obertürkheim in Stuttgart in the mid-1890s with the intention of preaching there, but found little interest so sold his house and prepared with his mother to emigrate permanently. He left two converts: 27-year-old Friedrich Weber (30 April 1899) and, in Schmalkalden near Kassel, Henriette Britzius, who with her husband emigrated to Birmingham, England and remained a bridge between British and German Christadelphians into her old age.

Following the death of his mother in the USA, Maier returned to Germany, carrying his own translations of booklets by John Thomas and Robert Roberts, and Thomas Williams' book „Der Welt Erlösung” translated by A. H. Zilmer and Johann G. Miller.

With materials in German, and the help of Weber, Maier was more successful. He founded the first Urchristen Gemeinde in Kornwestheim and in Stuttgart-Gaisburg. After the First World War in 1922 Maier met Johannes Reich a preacher of the Neuapostolische Gemeinde, and Reich and most of his congregation were rebaptised. New Gemeinde appeared in Nufringen, Reutlingen, Pfullingen, Ludwigsburg und Kirchheim am Neckar.

At the same time Ludwig von Gerdtell, who had made direct contact with Professor Thomas Turner of the English Fraternal Visitor magazine, was leading a Gemeinde in Berlin with the Christadelphian Ludwig Knupfer. Gerdtell was originally with the Baptists, and for a time would be with the Christadelphians, though following his outspoken engagement in politics - and the reporting of a statement made in a local grocer's shop in 1934 that "Hitler is synonymous with war", he had to flee via Spain to America.

Maier was more circumspect. Although the Christadelphians were suspect for their pacifism, and pro-Jewish interpretations of prophecy, Maier maintained a "strangers and pilgrims" attitude to Germany's politics, with the result that most of the Christadelphians avoided arrest until war broke out and conscription was introduced; several were imprisoned and Albert Merz was executed in April 1941.

Maier died peacefully on 3 April 1944.

== Legacy ==
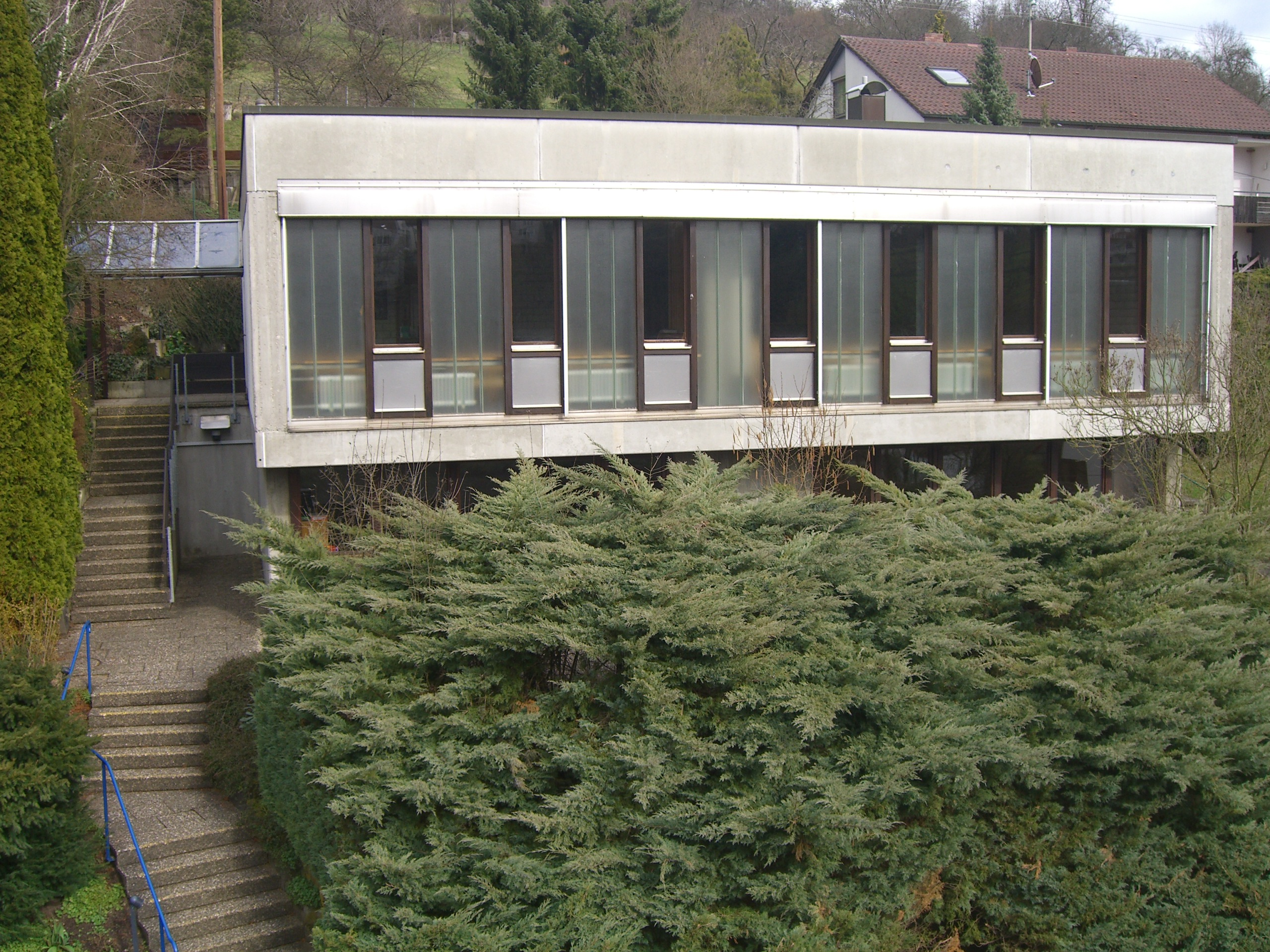
Gemeindehaus der Christadelphians in Esslingen am Neckar

After the war the Gemeinde started by Maier in Baden-Württemberg recovered and built a new Gemeindehaus in Esslingen am Neckar.
