= Albert Meyer =

Albert Meyer may refer to:

- Albert Meyer (politician) (1870–1953), member of the Swiss Federal Council, 1929–1938
- Albert Gregory Meyer (1903–1965), Archbishop of Chicago
- Albert J. Meyer (economist) (1919–1983), American economist
- Albert J. Meyer (accountant), forensic accountant and investor
- Albert R. Meyer (born 1941), computer scientist
- Albert Meyer (footballer), Swiss footballer

== See also ==
- Albert J. Myer (1828–1880), surgeon and US Army officer
- Albert L. Myer (1846–1914), mayor of Ponce, Puerto Rico, 1899
- USNS Albert J. Myer, a 1945 cable ship built for the U.S. Army named for Albert J. Myer, later Navy Neptune-class cable repair ship
- Albert Meyers (1932–2007), American organic chemist
- Albert Meier (fl. 1940s–1950s), Swiss footballer
- Albert Mayer (disambiguation)
- Albert Myer (disambiguation)
