= Eugene Meyer =

Eugene Meyer may refer to:

- Eugene Meyer (financier) (1875–1959), American financier, public official, and Washington Post publisher
- Marc Eugene Meyer (1842–1925), Franco-American businessman, father of Eugene Isaac Meyer
- Eugène Meyer (inventor) (19th century), French mechanic credited with making important contributions to the development of the bicycle
- Eugene B. Meyer, president of the Federalist Society

== See also ==
- Eugene Myers (born 1953), American computer scientist
- Eugene Mayer (1892–1918), American football player
