= Thomas Meyer =

Thomas or Tom Meyer may refer to:

- Thomas Meyer (political scientist), German political scientist
- Thomas Meyer zu Schlochtern (born 1946), Dutch art historian and curator
- Thomas Meyer (businessman), Swiss businessman, founder of the clothing brand Desigual
- Tom Meyer (politician) (1942–2007), member of the Michigan House of Representatives
- Tom Meyer (Bible Memory Man) (born 1976), American speaker, college professor, Bible memorization expert, and author
- Tom Meyer (basketball) (1922–2019), American basketball player
- Tommy Meyer (born 1990), American soccer player
- Tom Meijer (born 1938), also known as Tom Meyer, host of the Happy Station Show on Radio Netherlands

== See also ==
- Thomas Mayer (disambiguation)
