= Sven Meyer =

Sven Meyer may refer to:

- Sven Meyer (figure skater) (1977–1999), German figure skater
- Sven Meyer (footballer) (born 1970), German footballer
