= Martin Meyer =

Martin Meyer or similar names may refer to:

- Martin Mayer (1928–2019), American business writer
- Martin Meier (born 1984), Swiss bobsledder
- Martin A. Meyer (1879–1923), American rabbi
- Martin Meyerson (1922–2007), American city planner and university president
- Martin Myers, member of Canadian band Waiting for God
- Martin Meyer (South African politician), South African politician
- Martin Meyer (Liechtenstein politician), deputy prime minister of Liechtenstein
