= Franz Meyer (disambiguation) =

Franz Meyer (1868–1933) was a German engineer and designer of optical instruments.

Franz Meyer may also refer to:

- Franz Andreas Meyer (1837–1901), German civil engineer
- Franz Sales Meyer (1849–1927), German painter and writer, known for A Handbook of Ornament
