= Thomas Mayer (footballer, born 1984) =

German footballer

Personal information
- Date of birth: 6 February 1984 (age 42)
- Place of birth: Schwabmünchen, West Germany
- Height: 1.75 m (5 ft 9 in)
- Position: Defender

Youth career
- –2003: FC Augsburg

Senior career*
Years	Team	Apps	(Gls)
2003–2004	FC Augsburg II	4	(4)
2004–2007	TSV Aindling	89	(9)
2007–2009	Wacker Burghausen	25	(1)
2008	Wacker Burghausen II	1	(0)
2009–2010	SSV Reutlingen 05	25	(1)
2011	TSV Gersthofen	18	(0)
2011–2014	ASV Neumarkt	78	(3)
2014–2017	TuS Kastl 1924	44	(2)
Total		284	(20)

Managerial career
- 2014–2017: TuS Kastl 1924
- * Club domestic league appearances and goals

Thomas Mayer (born 6 February 1984) is a German former footballer who played as a defender.
