= Kurt Meyer (Lucerne) =

Swiss politician

Kurt Meyer (born 1944) is a Swiss politician and former member of the cantonal government of Lucerne heading the Finance department (1995–2005).

He is a member of the Christian Democratic People's Party (CVP).
