= Edward Meyer =

Edward or Ed Meyer may refer to:

- Edward C. Meyer (1928–2020), U.S. Army Chief of Staff
- Edward H. Meyer (1927–2023), American advertising executive
- J. Edward Meyer (born 1935), former New York assembly member, and Connecticut state senator
- Ed Meyer (American football) (1936–2014), American football player
- Ted Meyer (1907–1981), rugby league footballer of the 1930s for New Zealand, and Northland
