= Daniel Meyer =

Daniel Meyer is the name of:

== Sportsmen ==
- Dan Meyer (first baseman) (born 1952), baseball utility player
- Dan Meyer (pitcher) (born 1981), baseball pitcher
- Danny Meyer (footballer) (born 1986), Australian rules footballer for the Port Adelaide Football Club
- Daniel Meyer (coach) (born 1979), German football manager
- Daniel Meyer (curler) (born 1955), Swiss wheelchair curler, 2010 Winter Paralympian

== Others ==
- Daniel Meyer (engineer) (1932–1998), founder and president Southwest Technical Products Corporation
- Dan Meyer (Wisconsin politician) (born 1949), Wisconsin Secretary of Natural Resources and former state assemblyman
- Daniel Meyer (conductor), American conductor and musical director
- Danny Meyer (born 1958), New York City restaurateur
- Danny Meyer (politician) (1936–2016), American politician

== See also ==
- Daniel Mayer (1909–1996), French politician
- Daniel Mayr (born 1995), German professional basketball player
