= Georg Meyer =

Georg Meyer may refer to:

- Georg Meyer (sport shooter) (born 1868), German sport shooter
- Georg Meyer (aviator) (1893–1926), German World War I fighter ace
- Georg Meyer (athlete), German Paralympic athlete

== See also ==
- George Meyer (disambiguation)
