= John Miers =

John Miers may refer to:

- John Miers (artist) (1756–1821), British artist
- John Miers (botanist) (1789–1879), British botanist

== See also ==
- John Myers (disambiguation)
