= John G. Myers Company =

Albany NY department store

Coordinates: 42°39′2.7″N 73°45′6.2″W

- Industry: Department store retail
- Founded: 1887; 139 years ago
- Founder: John Gillespy Myers
- Defunct: 1970

John G. Myers Company was a department store in Albany, New York built in 1887 and owned by John Gillespy Myers. The building where the store was located, a five-story structure at 39 N. Pearl St., collapsed on August 8, 1905 killing 13 people.

The collapse was the worst disaster of its kind in Albany's history at the time. Charges of manslaughter and criminal negligence were made against the building's contractor, John Dyer Jr., and architect, Clark L. Daggett, but a grand jury failed to convict them and the charges were dropped.

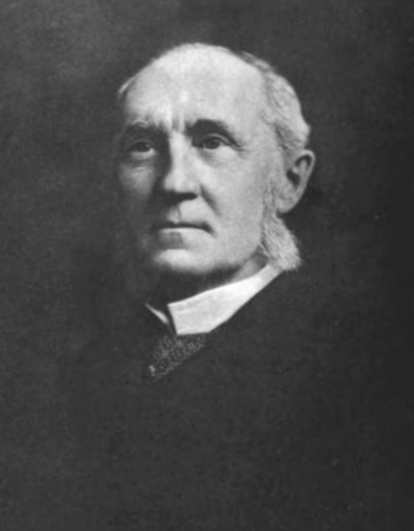
John Gillespy Myers

After the collapse the store reopened at 37 N. Pearl St. and stayed in business until 1970.
