= Gustavo Santos (politician) =

Argentine politician

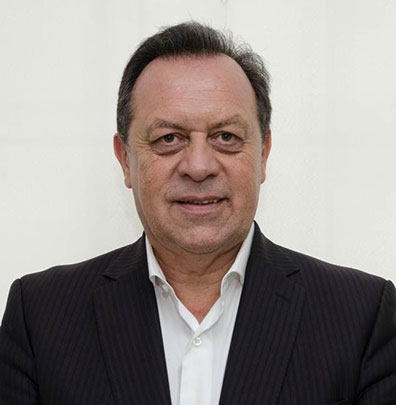
Gustavo Santos

Gustavo Santos is an Argentine politician. He was appointed minister of Tourism by Mauricio Macri. Since 2021, he has been a National Deputy elected in Córdoba for the Juntos por el Cambio coalition.

== Biography ==
=== Education ===
Between 1971 and 1979, he studied Bachelor of Arts at the National University of Córdoba, where he studied two more years to become a professor of the same discipline.

He served as Professor at the Instituto Escuelas Pías in the same province. In August 2017, he received the title of "Honorary Professor" from the Blas Pascal University "in attention to his trajectory and relevant contributions to tourism and culture".
