= Ny Illustrerad Tidning =

Swedish weekly newspaper (1865–1900)

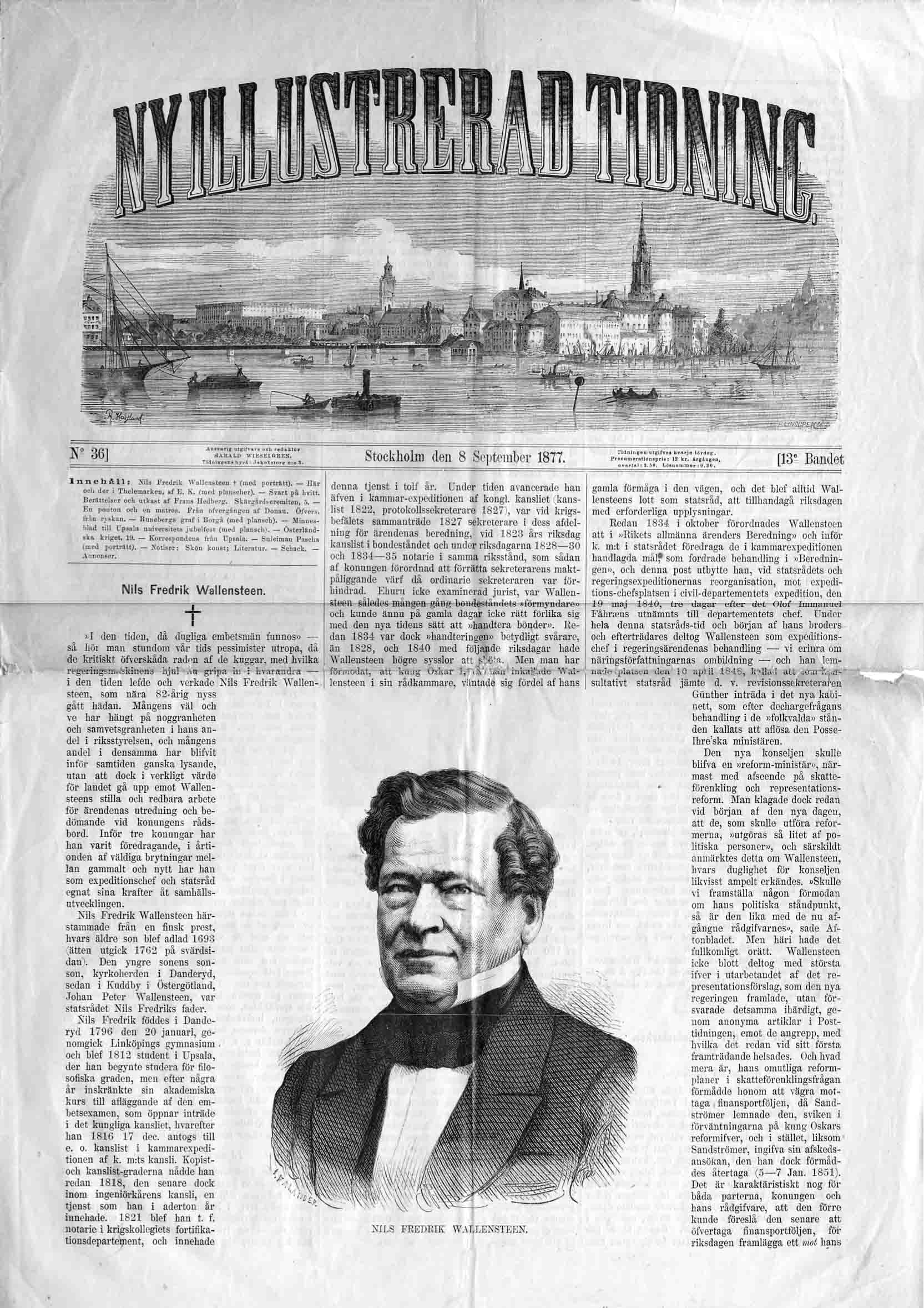
- Cover page dated 8 September 1877
- Type: Weekly newspaper
- Founder: Elias Sehlstedt
- Editor-in-chief: Elias Sehlstedt
- Founded: 1865
- Ceased publication: September 1900
- Language: Swedish
- Headquarters: Stockholm
- Country: Sweden

Ny Illustrerad Tidning (Swedish: New Illustrated Newspaper) was a weekly newspaper published in Stockholm, Sweden, between 1865 and 1900.

== History and profile ==
Ny Illustrerad Tidning was launched in Stockholm in 1865. The founder and editor was Elias Sehlstedt. It came out weekly on Saturdays. The paper featured travel notes of Norwegian author Camilla Collett. It also published travel notes and other articles of Gösta Mittag-Leffler who would become its editor.

The paper folded in September 1900 shortly after death of its founder Elias Sehlstedt.
