= 1804 in Norway =

- Centuries: 17th; 18th; 19th; 20th; 21st
- Decades: 1780s; 1790s; 1800s; 1810s; 1820s
- See also: 1804 in Denmark; List of years in Norway

Events in the year 1804 in Norway.

== Incumbents ==
- Monarch: Christian VII.

== Events ==
- 6 January - Mathias Bonsach Krogh became the first Bishop of the Diocese of Hålogaland.
- 24 September - Trondhjems amt was split into two, with the northern part becoming Nordre Trondhjems amt and the southern part becoming Søndre Trondhjems amt.
- The first Agdenes Lighthouse was established.

== Births ==
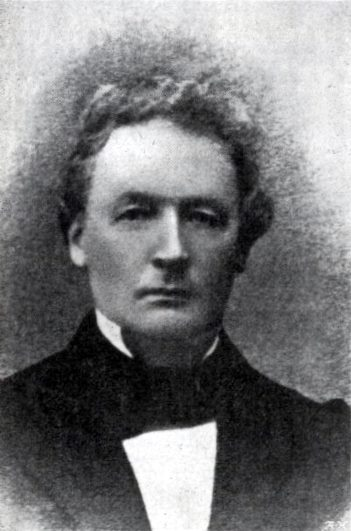
Eskild Bruun

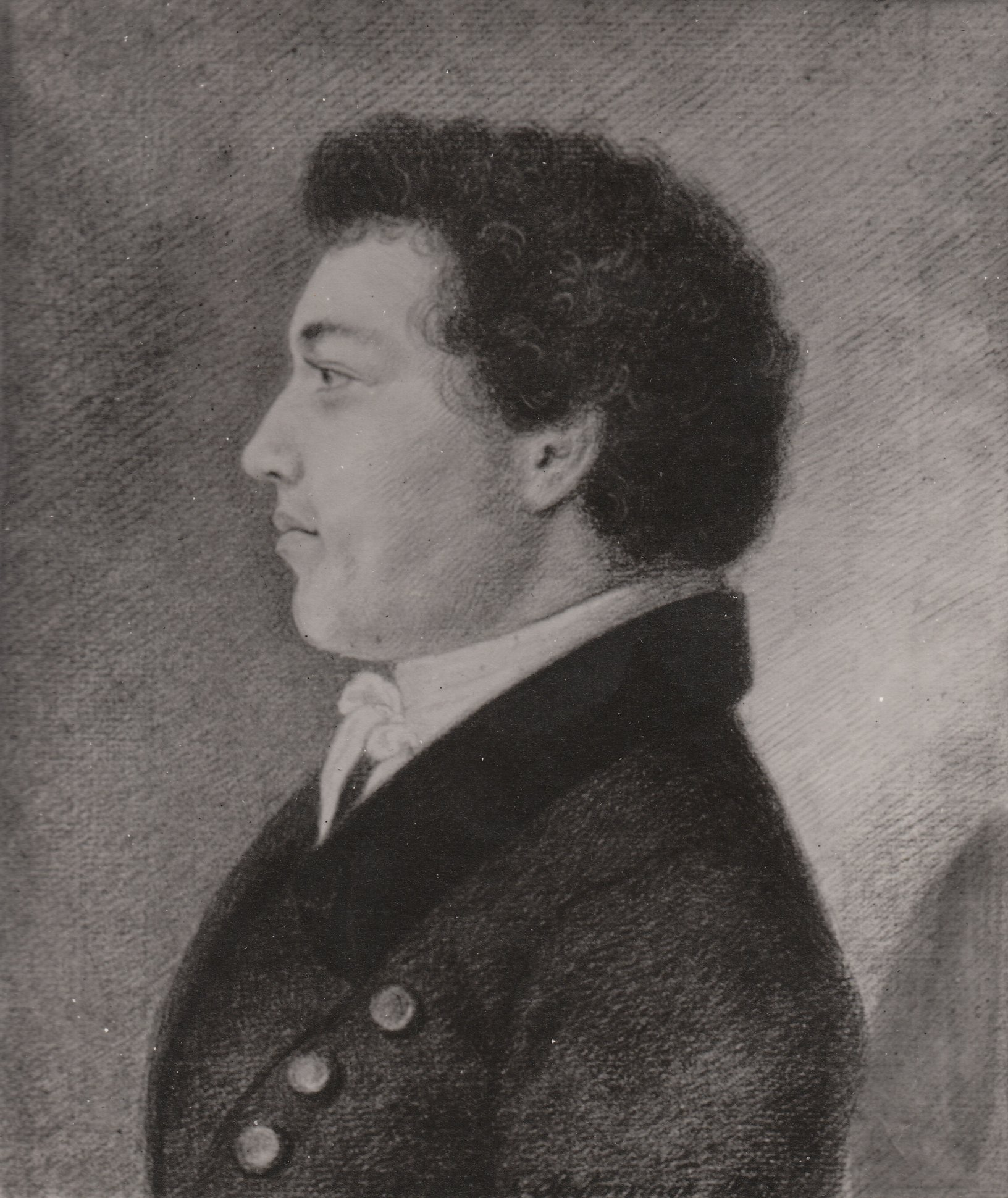
Jens Kaurin

- 29 May – Søren Wilhelm Thorne, priest and politician (d. 1878)
- 6 June – Georg Wallace, politician (d. 1890)
- 5 July – Anton Theodor Harris, politician (d. 1866)
- 9 September - Kristoffer Nilsen Svartbækken Grindalen, criminal, killer and thief (d. 1876).
- 17 September – Hans Biørn Wenneberg, politician (d. 1878)
- 19 September – Elling Eielsen, minister and Lutheran Church leader in America (d.1883)
- 20 September – Christopher Henrik Holfeldt Tostrup, timber merchant and land-owner (d. 1881)
- 12 October – Eskild Bruun, barrister, judge and businessman (d. 1877).
- 4 November – Peder Balke, painter (d. 1887)
- 8 November – Hans Eleonardus Møller, politician and businessperson (d.1867)
- 21 November – Henrik Heftye, businessman and philanthropist (d. 1864)
- 25 November – Jens Matthias Pram Kaurin, professor of theology, biblical translator, and Lutheran priest (d. 1863).
- 19 December – Carl Siegfried Bonnevie, naval officer (d. 1856)

=== Full date unknown ===
- Paulus Flood, merchant and politician (d.1847)
- Jens Christian Folkman Schaanning, politician
- Jacob Worm Skjelderup, politician and Minister (d.1863)
- Hans Biørn Wenneberg, politician

== Deaths ==
- 17 March – Hans Tank, skipper, merchant and endowment founder (b. 1742).
- 29 June – Halvor Blinderen, farmer (born 1733).
- 4 December – Jens Holmboe, bailiff (b. 1752)

=== Full date unknown ===
- Kristofer Sjursson Hjeltnes, farmer and businessperson (b.1730)
