= Seierstad =

Sejersted, Seyersted or Seierstad may refer to:

== People ==
=== Sejersted ===
- Johannes Klingenberg Sejersted (1761–1823) Lieutenant General Nordenfjells
- Per Seyersted (1921–2005), professor
- Ernst Sejersted Selmer (1920–2006) and Knut Sejersted Selmer (1924–2009), professor brothers
- Francis Sejersted (1936–2015) historian and his son Fredrik Sejersted (1965–) law professor, government lawyer
- Lotte Smiseth Sejersted (1991–) and Adrian Smiseth Sejersted (1994–), Alpine siblings

=== Seierstad ===
- Åsne Seierstad (1970–), writer
- Hans Seierstad (1951–) runs the farm Østre Seierstad on Østre Toten and is the mayor

== Other ==
- Seierstad, Norway, a farm in Fosnes Municipality in Trøndelag county, Norway
