= Svalbard Satellite Station =

Satellite ground station on Spitsbergen, Svalbard, Norway

- Svalbard satelittstasjon
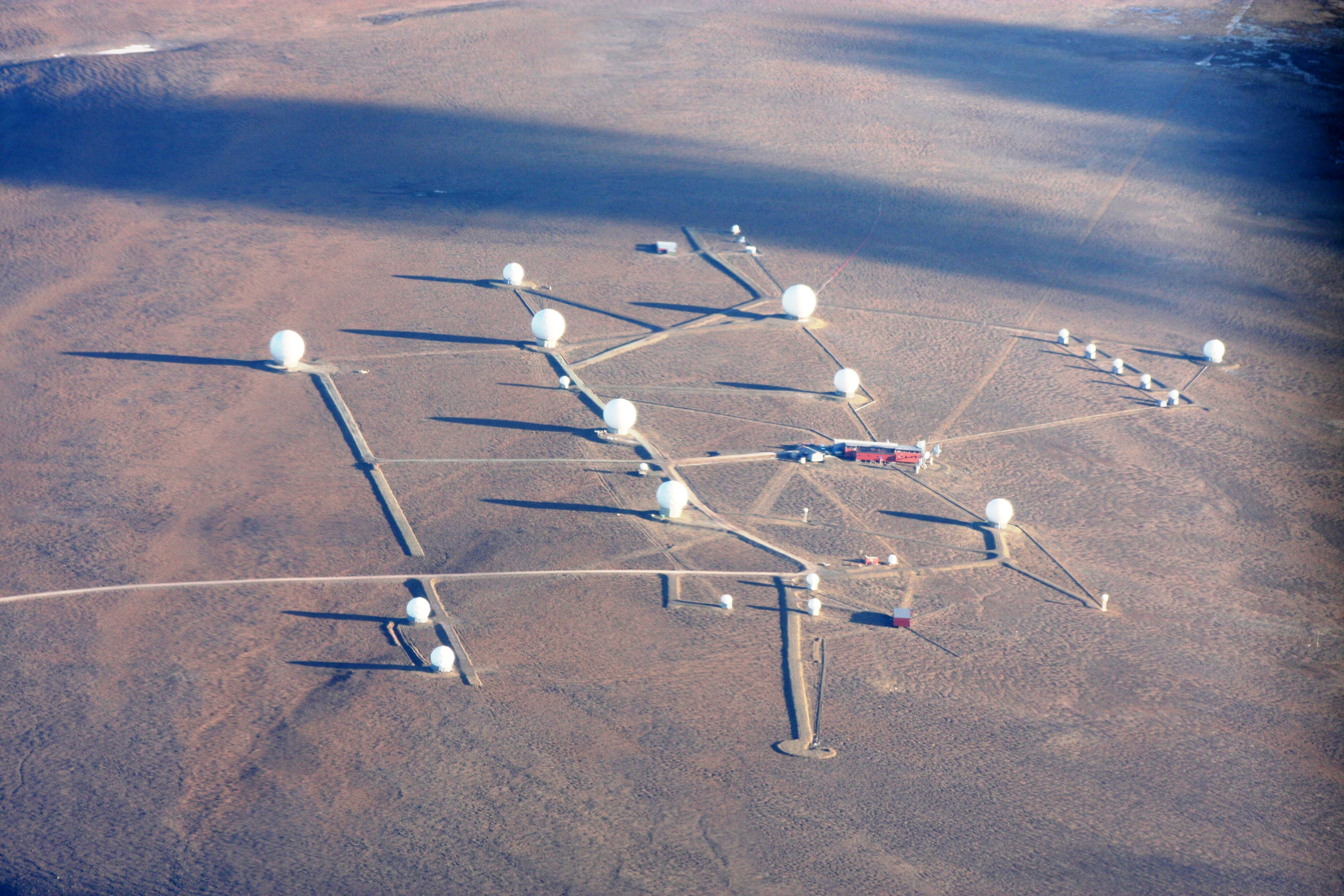
- Established: 1997
- Research type: Satellite ground station
- Location: Platåberget, Svalbard, Norway; 78°13′47.18″N 15°24′28.03″E
- Affiliations: Kongsberg Defence & Aerospace; Norwegian Space Centre
- Operating agency: Kongsberg Satellite Services

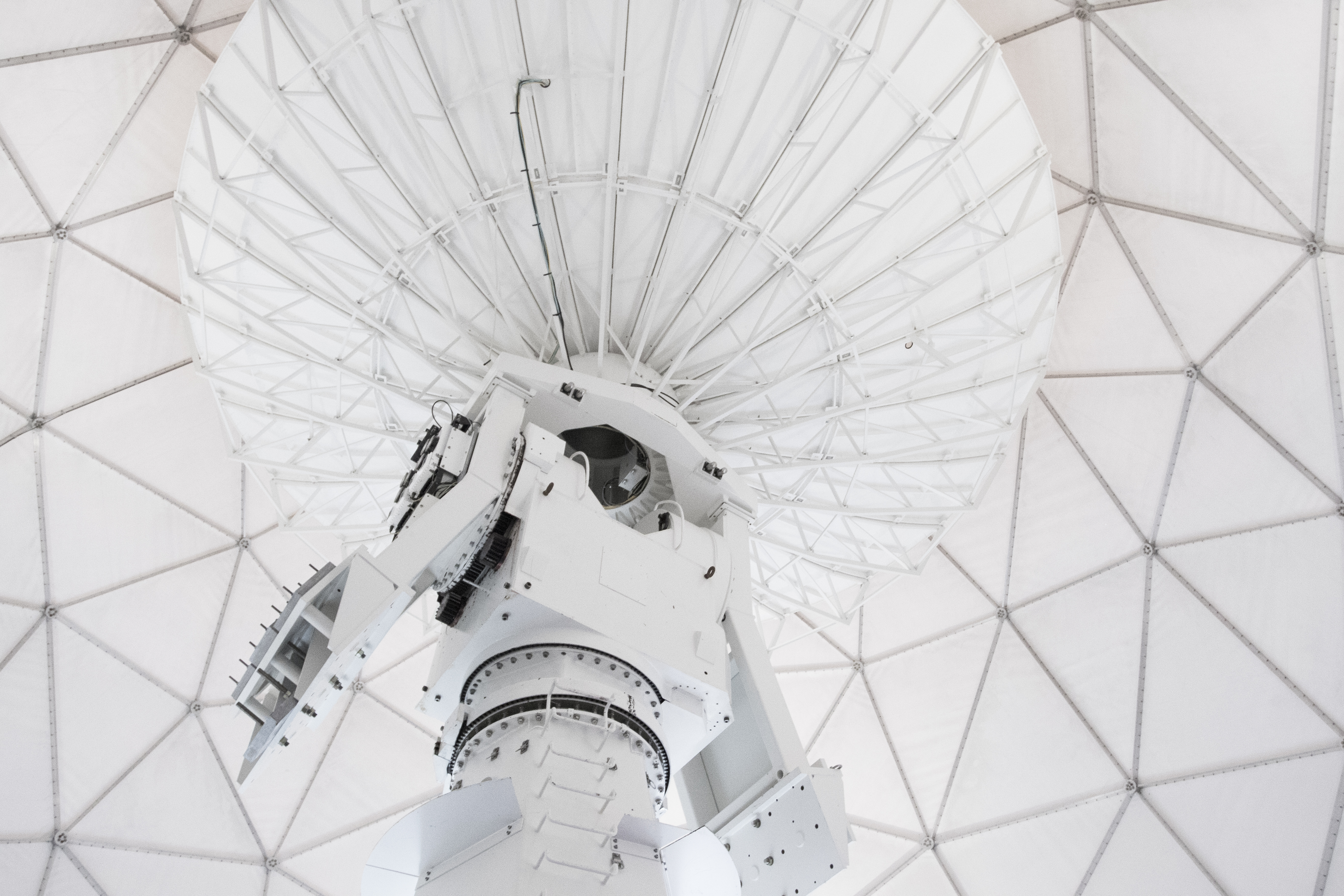
Internal view of a radome containing a Viasat antenna

Svalbard Satellite Station (Norwegian: Svalbard satellittstasjon) or SvalSat is a satellite ground station located on Platåberget near Longyearbyen in Svalbard, Norway. Opened in 1997, it is operated by Kongsberg Satellite Services (KSAT), a joint venture between Kongsberg Defence & Aerospace and the Norwegian Space Centre (NSC). SvalSat and KSAT's Troll Satellite Station (TrollSat) in Antarctica are the only ground stations that can see a low altitude polar orbiting satellite (e.g., in Sun-synchronous orbit) on every revolution as the Earth rotates. As of 2021, the facility consists of 100 multi-mission and customer-dedicated antennas which operate in the C, L, S, X and K bands. The station provides ground services to more satellites than any other facility in the world.

Customers with their own installations include the European Organisation for the Exploitation of Meteorological Satellites (EUMETSAT), the National Aeronautics and Space Administration (NASA), the European Space Agency (ESA) and the National Oceanic and Atmospheric Administration (NOAA). The station also reads and distributes data from the Japanese Hinode solar research satellite. The facility has seen a large increase in smaller customers after 2004, when the Svalbard Undersea Cable System started providing a fiber Internet connection. Concessions for downloading are only issued to civilian satellites, yet some data has been indirectly used by armed forces. There is a disagreement as to whether this constitutes a breach of the Svalbard Treaty.

== History ==
The European Space Research Organization (ESRO) established Kongsfjord Telemetry Station in Ny-Ålesund as one of its four initial European Space Tracking Network stations. The facility remained in use from 1967 to 1974, but was closed as it was not suitable for ESRO's second generation of satellites. During the planning of the station, Longyearbyen had been proposed as a location, and it was largely political concerns by Norwegian authorities to create permanent activity in Ny-Ålesund which lead ESRO to accept the location.

In the 1990s, NSC operated Tromsø Satellite Station (TSS), which was used as a ground station for a limited number of satellites. After Rolf Skår was appointed director of NSC, plans were launched to try to win the ground station contract for NASA's planned Earth Observing System (EOS). NASA was considering locating the ground station in Greenland, at McMurdo Station in Antarctica or at Esrange in Sweden. Skår invited a NASA delegation to visit Svalbard, and from 1996 NSC and NASA started negotiating a contract to establish a ground station at Longyearbyen.

Svalbard was chosen because of its high latitude from which every polar-orbiting satellite above 500 kilometers (310 mi) can be seen on every revolution as the earth rotates within its orbital plane. For the EOS program, Svalbard was supplemented by Poker Flat Research Range in Fairbanks, Alaska. Construction of the road up to Platåberget started in 1996 and a relay station was built to send the data to Isfjord Radio before being sent onwards to a geostationary satellite. The first installation was an 11-meter (36 ft) parabolic antenna with S and X band capability.

The first satellite to use SvalSat was Landsat 7, which was launched on 15 April 1999. It was followed up by three other EOS satellites: Terra, Aqua and QuikSCAT. To ensure a sustainable financing of operations, NSC started negotiating with other potential customers. However, the project was rejected by the Indian Space Research Organisation. Instead, a cooperation was made with Kongsberg Aerospace and Defence and Lockheed Martin, who built the second antenna as a joint venture. In 2001, a German research group applied for permission to establish a ground station in Ny-Ålesund. NSC feared that the competition could undermine the financial capabilities of SvalSat. However, no facility in Ny-Ålesund was built.

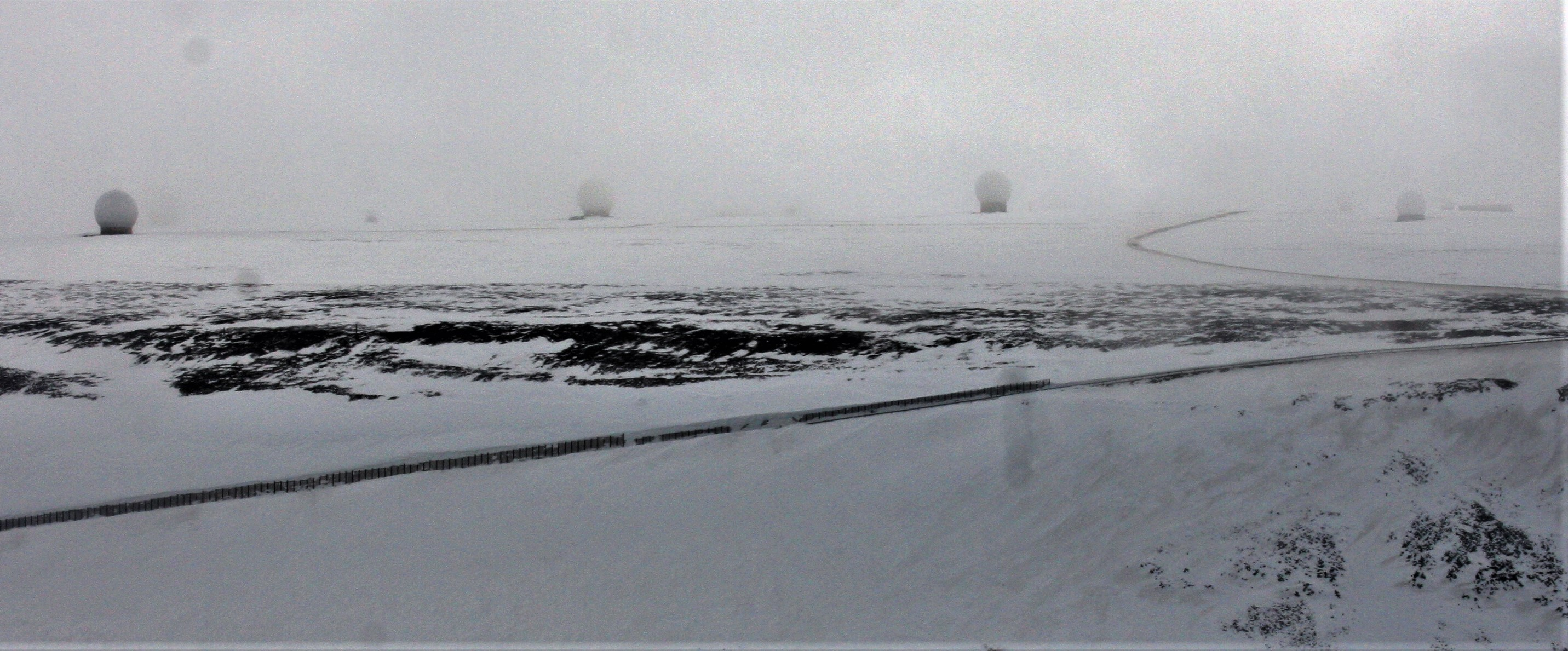
The road up to SvalSat with radomes in the background

In 2002, ownership and operations of the facility were consolidated and taken over by the newly created Kongsberg Satellite Services. Lockheed Martin was no longer interested in owning a share of the facility, and sold their shares. NSC and Kongsberg merged their interests in the new company, which also took over TSS. By 2004, six antennas, between 9 and 13 meters (30 and 43 ft) in diameter, had been installed.

Northrop Grumman and Raytheon decided in 2002 to locate its ground station for National Polar-orbiting Operational Environmental Satellite System, the successor of EOS, to Helsinki, Finland, instead of Svalbard. The reason was lack of optical fiber cable connection to the archipelago. NSC took initiative to build such a cable in July 2002 and gained interest from NASA, NOAA and Telenor. The cable was financed by the satellite operators paying the same fee for the transmission of data as they would have to pay for a satellite connection until the cable was paid for. A 40 million United States dollar contract was signed with Tyco International for two cables between Harstad on the mainland and Longyearbyen. Construction started in June 2003 and was completed in January 2004.

Starting in 2007, SvalSat was expanded with 12 antennas. Five are used for Galileo, while the remaining are used for a large array of customers. In 2007 and 2008, both Terra and Landsat 7 were hacked twice. The hackers were able to achieve all steps which would have been necessary to take control over the satellites, but did not actually take control. The operation commanded the satellites via SvalSat, which it was able to hack via the Internet connection.

In his 2011 book Satellittkrigen, Norwegian Broadcasting Corporation journalist Bård Wormdal argues that SvalSat is used for military intelligence and thus is violating the Svalbard Treaty. Specifically, Wormdal provides evidence that downloaded images of the earth are used for intelligence and military activities. For instance, a Landsat image taken during the Libyan Civil War was sold by the Italian company e-GEOS to the Italian Armed Forces. Similarly, a Technology Experiment Satellite image was sold to the United States Armed Forces during the War in Afghanistan and Arirang-2 images of North Korean installations have been sold to the United States. All three satellites use SvalSat as one of their ground stations. According to Governor Odd Olsen Ingerø, even if a military should indirectly use information downloaded from SvalSat, this would not be a breach of the treaty. A dissertation by Professor Geir Ulfstein concludes that even if a ground station was directly used for downloading military intelligence from military satellites, it would still be permitted by the treaty.

On January 7, 2022, an undersea fiberoptic cable located between the Svalbard Satellite Station and the Norwegian mainland was cut and put out of operation in mysterious incident. The official press release from Space Norway said the extent of the damage was not clear and will require a cable-laying ship to investigate and repair.

== Operation ==
SvalSat is owned and operated by Kongsberg Satellite Services (KSAT), which is again equally owned by the Kongsberg Defence and Aerospace and the Norwegian Space Centre, the latter which is again owned by the Ministry of Trade and Industry. Of KSAT's 200 employees, 40 are stationed in Longyearbyen and work at SvalSat. KSAT is not tied to a particular operator of satellites and some of the antennas communicate with multiple satellites, thus reducing costs compared to dedicated ground stations. For a typical satellite, data is delivered to the end customer no more than 30 minutes after downloading. As of January 2020 SvalSat receives data from 130 different satellites, and with Tromsø station receives data from at total of 40 000 passes each month.

All ground stations are connected to KSAT's Tromsø Network Operation Center, which is also connected to the TSS and TrollSat. This allows for redundancy as also TSS and TrollSat can be used to communicate with the satellites. Some customers have direct access to their installations in Longyearbyen without having to route via the Tromsø Network Operation Center. The operation center is responsible for backup, scheduling and conflict resolution. The facility uses interoperability and shared ground services, such as a common protocol for communication and similar design of the antennas, to increase flexibility and reduce costs and risk.

KSAT operates two polar ground stations optimized for low Earth orbit (LEO) satellites, the other being TrollSat at Troll in Antarctica. These are the only two ground stations able to see a polar-orbiting satellite on every revolution. By using both stations, customers can communicate with a satellite twice per orbit.

All satellites which use SvalSat need a concession from the Norwegian Post and Telecommunications Authority. Such a concession is only awarded to satellites which would abide by the treaty and explicitly excludes any military satellites. However, this does not prevent information from dual-use satellites being sold to military organizations. The Governor of Svalbard inspects the station twice per year. This includes checking the logs of satellites SvalSat has communicated with, but not the actual information transferred. All SvalSat employees need a security clearance from NATO and the Norwegian Armed Forces.

== Facilities ==
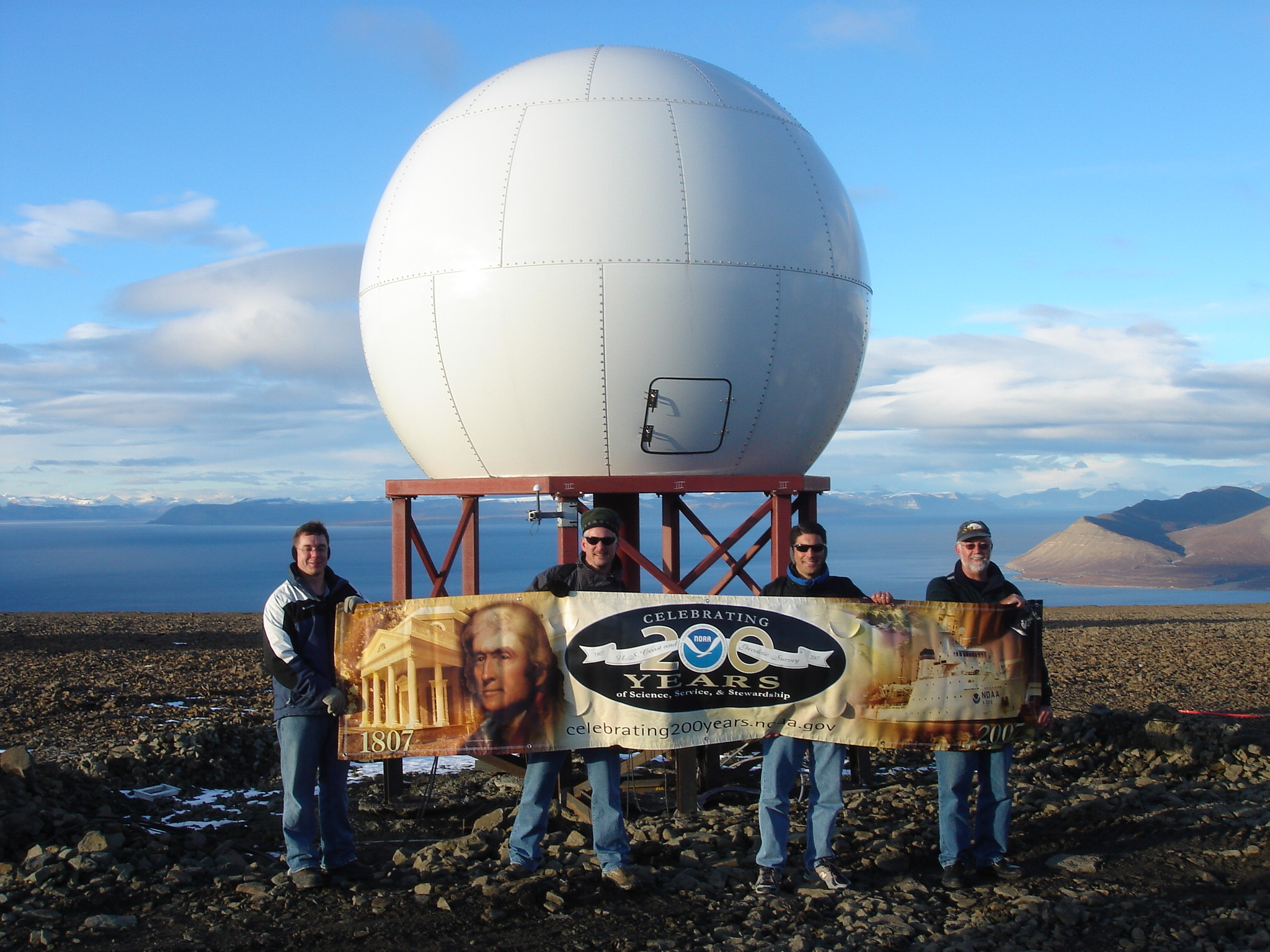
NOAA employees in front of one of NOAA's antennas

SvalSat is located on Platåberget, a mountain plateau 400 to 500 meters (1,300 to 1,600 ft) above mean sea level just outside Longyearbyen on the island of Spitsbergen in Svalbard, Norway. The location on the 78th parallel north is favorable to communication with satellites in low polar orbits. The facility consists of close to 100 antenna systems (as of des. 2019), both multi-mission and customer dedicated, making SvalSat the world's largest commercial ground station. They are variously capable of communication in the C, L, S, X and K bands. SvalSat makes use of the Consultative Committee for Space Data Systems' Space Link Extension protocols, an international standard for ground station to satellite communication. Most antennas use the S band for tracking, telemetry and commanding and the X band for high-speed data download.

Originally, SvalSat used a combination of a 2 megabits per second (Mb/s) leased line, several Integrated Services Digital Network lines and a 55 Mbit/s satellite Internet access via Intelsat for data transmission off the island. From 2004, the Svalbard Undersea Cable System gives two redundant fiber lines to the mainland, each providing 10 gigabits per second. The fiber connection is operated by Telenor. Power is supplied from Longyearbyen Power Station, In case of a power outage, the facility is equipped with an uninterruptible power supply and has a standby generator capable of supplying power for two weeks.

The facility consists of a 600-square-meter (6,500 sq ft) main operations building, a 70-square-meter (750 sq ft) building for the emergency power supply, a transformer station, and a mobile research station, in addition to the radomes. The lot is located above Store Norske Spitsbergen Kulkompani's Mine 3 and is leased to KSAT. The facility is connected to Longyearbyen via a 3.5-kilometer (2.2 mi) long private road. When the road is closed because of avalanches and land slides, helicopter transport is used. There is a road connecting all the antennas to ease maintenance. Installations at SvalSat not related to satellite communication include a measuring station for radioactive particles in the air operated by Norwegian Seismic Array, a telecommunications installation operated by Telenor, a weather station operated by the Norwegian Meteorological Institute, with information relayed to Svalbard Airport, Longyear, and a weather station operated by SvalSat.

Antennas are placed according to customer specifications, which normally involves a distance of 200 meters (660 ft) between antennas. This is to ensure that antennas do not shade each other and that their electromagnetic noise and radio noise do not interfere with each other. Locations are chosen to maximize satellite pass durations, view a calibration station on Hiorthhamnfjellet, provide visibility of the Clarke Belt for geostationary satellite antennas, or visibility to Isfjord Radio for terrestrial communications antennas.

== Customers ==
SvalSat is part of NASA's Near Earth Network. This includes support for the Earth Observing System, which includes satellites such as Aqua, Aura, Ice, Cloud and Land Elevation Satellite, and QuikSCAT, as well as the Small Explorer program which includes Galaxy Evolution Explorer, the Submillimeter Wave Astronomy Satellite, Swift Gamma-Ray Burst Mission, Thermosphere Ionosphere Mesosphere Energetics and Dynamics, Interface Region Imaging Spectrograph, and Transition Region and Coronal Explorer. SvalSat and Poker Flat are collectively responsible for half of the network's 140 daily passes. Satellites operated by the National Oceanic and Atmospheric Administration using SvalSat includes the Suomi National Polar-Orbiting Partnership and the Defense Meteorological Satellite Program. Other American satellites include the United States Geological Survey's Landsat 5 and Landsat 7 and the private Iridium Communications' satellites.

The European Space Agency operates several antennas, which are able to transmit in the S band and receive in the S and X band. ESA uses the facility for tracking, telemetry, telecommand, radiometric measurements and system validation. Satellites include European Remote-Sensing Satellite 2, Sentinel 1, 2, 3 and 5P and Envisat. The European Organisation for the Exploitation of Meteorological Satellites uses SvalSat as a ground station for its MetOp satellites, which allows communication with all MetOp orbits. SvalSat serves as one of five uplink stations and as a sensor station for Galileo. Five antennas are used for Galileo, including one with a 10-meter (33 ft) diameter and four at 4 meters (13 ft).

The Norwegian Coastal Administration uses SvalSat to track ships' Automatic Identification System in Norwegian waters via AISSat-1. The Japan Aerospace Exploration Agency uses SvalSat for its Hinode mission. Other customers include MacDonald, Dettwiler and Associates's Radarsat-1 and Radarsat-2, the Taiwanese National Space Organization's Formosat-2, the Korea Aerospace Research Institute of South Korea's Arirang-2, the Indian Space Research Organisation's Technology Experiment Satellite, Cartosat-1 and Cartosat-2, the German RapidEye constellation, the Italian Space Agency's COSMO-SkyMed and the German Aerospace Center's TerraSAR-X.
