= Platåberget =

Mountain in Nordenskiöld Land, Svalbard, Norway

Coordinates: 78°13.1′N 15°27.1′E

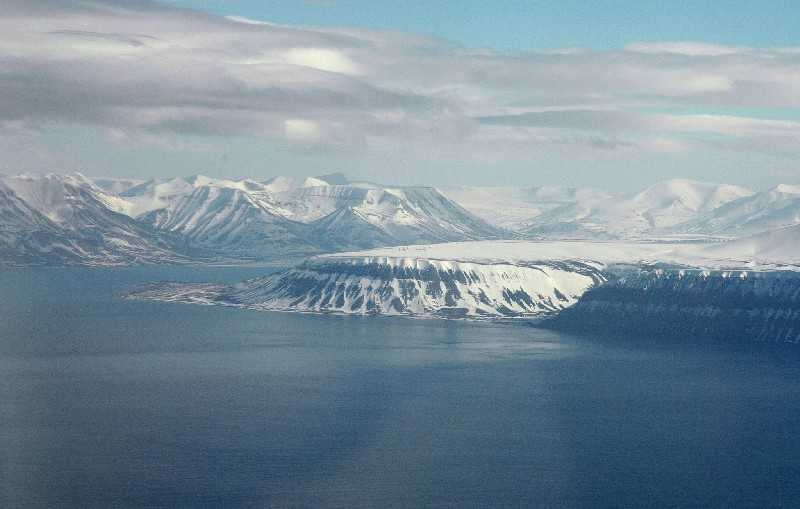
Platåberget as seen from Isfjorden

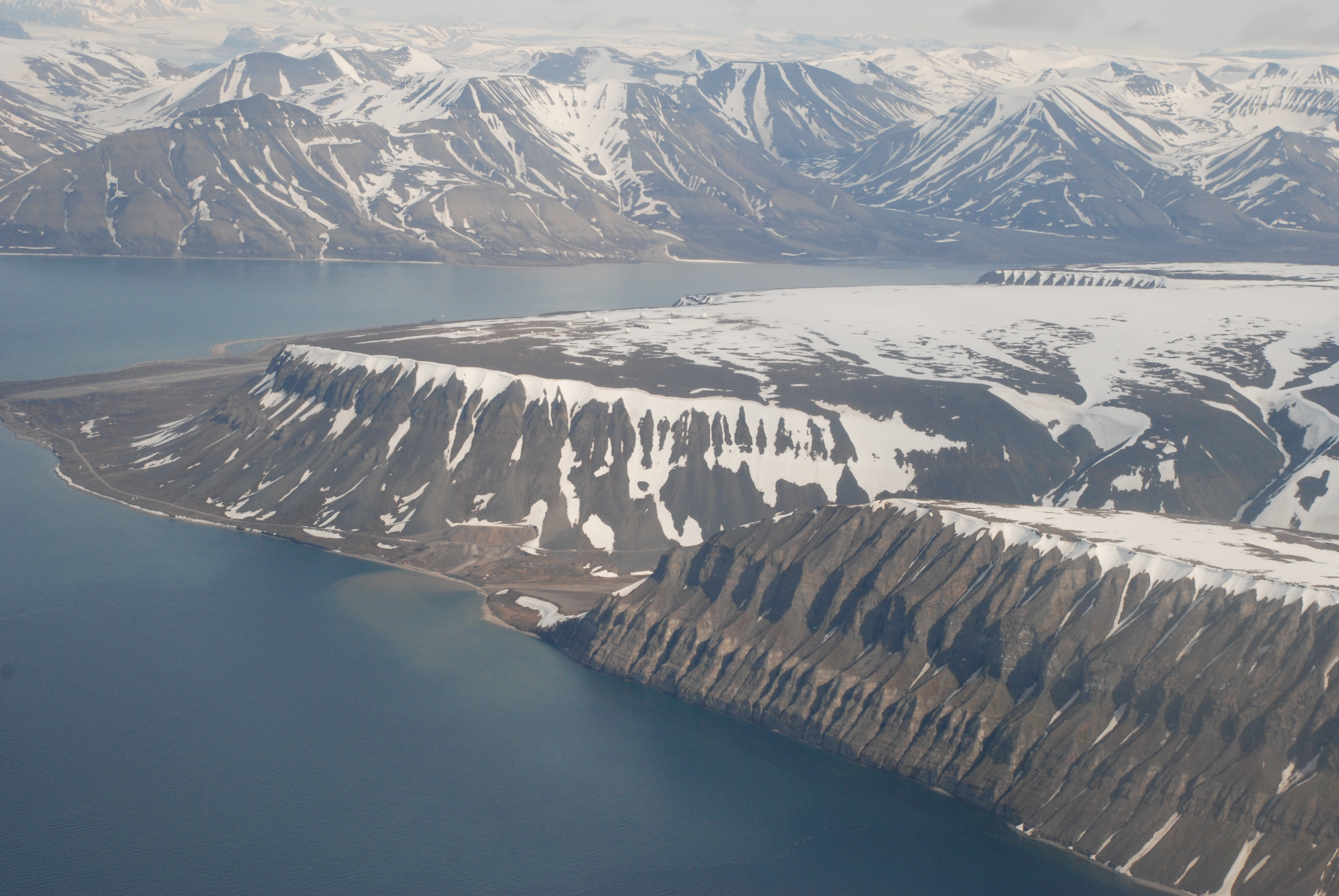
Platåberget in front of Adventfjorden

Platåberget is a mountain in Nordenskiöld Land on the island of Spitsbergen in Svalbard, Norway. It is 464 meters (1,522 ft) tall and has a distinct plateau shape, for which it is named. It is bordered to the west by the Bjørndalen valley and the Fuglefjella bird cliffs, to the east by the Blomsterdalen mountain and to the north by Hotellneset and Adventfjorden. The mountain is a few kilometers from Longyearbyen and is next to Svalbard Airport, Longyear. It is the site of Svalbard Satellite Station and Svalbard Global Seed Vault.

On 30 April 1995, a 22-year-old Norwegian college student, Nina Olaussen, was killed by a polar bear on Platåberget, only a few kilometers from Longyearbyen.
