= Solombala English =

Extinct Russian–English pidgin language

Solombala-English
- Native to: Russia
- Region: Solombala, Arkhangelsk
- Extinct: Late 19th century
- Language family: English–Russian pidgin
- Writing system: Russian

Language codes
- ISO 639-3: None (mis)
- Glottolog: solo1261
- IETF: cre-u-sd-ruark

Solombala English, or Solombala English–Russian Pidgin, (Russian: Соломбальский английский язык, romanized: Solombalskij anglijskij jazyk) is a pidgin derived from both English and Russian. It was spoken in the port of Solombala, in the city of Arkhangelsk, Russia in the 18th and 19th centuries. According to Yelena Perekhvalskaya, the pidgin may have started forming as early as the 17th century.

The known Solombala-English corpus consists of only two short 19th-century texts: one in Очерки Архангельской губернии (Essays from Arkhangelsk Governorate) by Vasilij Vereščagin from 1849, and one in Архангельские Губернские Ведомости (Arkhangelsk Governorate News) from 1867. Mentions of the pidgin are also found in the works of Mikhail Prishvin (early 20th century).

A possible connection is noted between Solombala English and Russenorsk (a Russian–Norwegian pidgin used in trade between Russian Pomors and Norwegians in the 19th and early 20th centuries). In particular, both pidgins use the suffix -(o)mъ as a verb marker, which may also reflect the influence of Finno-Ugric languages.

== Sample phrases ==
Source	Phrase in pidgin (Latin alphabet)	Phrase in pidgin (Cyrillic alphabet)	Word-for-word English translation	English translation	Russian translation	Notes
Верещагин 1849: 406–407	Vat ju vanted, asej!	Ватъ ю вантетъ, асей!	What you want, sailor!	What do you want, sailor!	Чего ты хочешь, матрос?	
Верещагин 1849: 407	Baem buč, šus, asej! Kom sjuda! Veri gud buč, šus.	Баемъ бучь, шусь, асей! Комъ сюда! Вери гудъ бучь, шусь!	Buy boots, shoes, sailor! Come here! Very good boots, shoes.	Buy shoes, shoes, sailor! Come here! Very good shoes.	Купи обувь, обувь, матрос! Иди сюда! Очень хорошая обувь.	In the original: шусь
Верещагин 1849: 407	Asej, asej! Daj tu kopejki!	Асей, асей! Дай ту копѣйки!	Sailor, sailor! Give me two copecks!	Sailor, sailor! Give me some money!	Матрос, матрос! Дай мне копейки!	In the original: Дай ту копѣйки!, i.e., possibly "give two kopecks"; the word ту is italicized in the original
Прушакевич 1867	Asej? Kom milek drinkom.		Sailor? Come milk drink.	Sailor? Come and drink some milk.	Матрос? Заходи молока выпей.	Invitation to a brothel
Прушакевич 1867	O! Yez! Bol’še dobra mačka.		Oh! Yes! Very good much.	Oh! Yes! Very, very good.	О! Да! Очень хорошо.	
Прушакевич 1867	Asej, asej, smotrom, bol’še dobra sunduk, vervvel’ skripim, gut verstom.		Sailor, sailor, look very good chest, very-good lock, good key.	Sailor, sailor, look, it’s a very good chest, a very good lock, a good key.	Матрос, матрос, смотри, большой добрый сундук, очень хороший замок, хороший ключ.	
