= Fredrik Sejersted =

Norwegian jurist (born 1965)

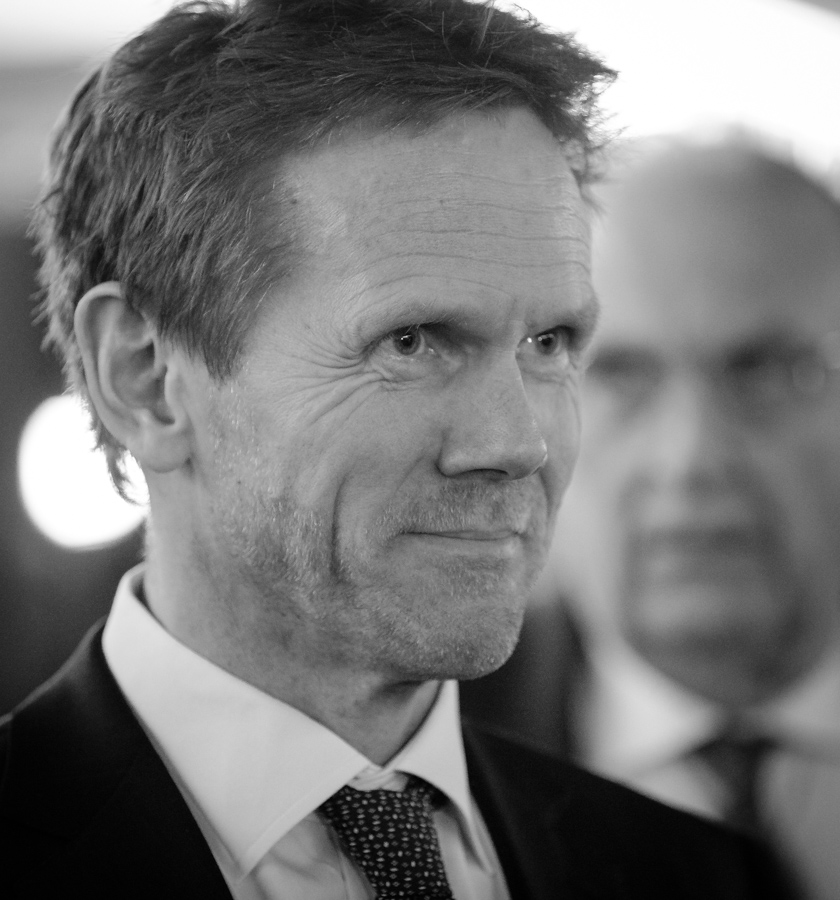
- Sejersted in 2018

Attorney General of Norway
- Incumbent
- Assumed office 17 April 2015
- Prime Minister: Erna Solberg
- Preceded by: Sven Ole Fagernæs

Personal details
- Born: 2 July 1965 (age 61)
- Parent(s): Francis Sejersted (father); Hilde Sejersted (mother)
- Occupation: Jurist

Fredrik Sejersted (born 2 July 1965) is a Norwegian jurist, and the current Attorney General of Norway.

He is a son of Francis and Hilde Sejersted. He has been a professor of law at the University of Oslo, and is known for chairing the Sejersted Commission (Seijersted-utvalget) from 2010 until they delivered the Norwegian Official Report 2012:2. He was appointed Attorney General of Norway from 2015, taking over the position after Sven Ole Fagernæs. In 2019, Carl Baudenbacher harshly criticized Sejersted in an op-ed for allegedly trying to undermine the law and courts of the European Free-Trade Area. Sejersted published a rebuttal in a similarly harsh op-ed.

Civic offices
Preceded by Sven Ole Fagernæs	Attorney General of Norway; 2015–present	Incumbent
