= Jan Grøndahl =

Norwegian police chief and civil servant

Jan Grøndahl (12 July 1934 - 6 November 2022) was a Norwegian police chief and civil servant.

He was born in Oslo, and took the cand.jur. degree. After spending the years 1972 to 1977 as chief of police in Sør-Varanger Municipality, he served as Governor of Svalbard from 1978 to 1982 and chief of police in Hamar Municipality from 1982 to 1998—except for the years 1991 to 1993, when he was acting director of the Norwegian Police Surveillance Agency.

Civic offices
Preceded by Leif Eldring	Governor of Svalbard; 1978–1982	Succeeded by Carl Alexander Wendt
Police appointments
Preceded by Svein Urdal	Acting Director of the Norwegian Police Surveillance Agency; 1991–1993	Succeeded by Hans Olav Østgaard
