= Leif Eldring =

Norwegian civil servant and judge

Leif Thomas Eldring (18 April 1933 – 25 August 1994) was a Norwegian judge and civil servant.

He was born in Vardø. He competed his education in law in 1963, having worked part-time in Postverket. He was Norway's Governor of Svalbard from 1974 to 1977 and 1985 to 1991. Between the two spells he had been appointed as deputy under-secretary of state in the Norwegian Ministry of Justice and the Police. Except for his second spell in Svalbard, he was the permanent under-secretary of state in the Ministry of Justice from 1979 to 1993. From 1 January 1994 to his death in August 1994 he served as a Supreme Court Justice.

Civic offices
Preceded by Fredrik Beichmann	Governor of Svalbard; 1974–1977	Succeeded by Jan Grøndahl
Preceded by Kristian Bloch	Permanent under-secretary of state in the Ministry of Justice and the Police; 1979–1991	Succeeded by Hans Vaalund (acting)
Preceded by Carl Alexander Wendt	Governor of Svalbard; 1985–1991	Succeeded by Odd Blomdal
Preceded by Hans Vaalund (acting)	Permanent under-secretary of state in the Ministry of Justice and the Police; 1991–1993	Succeeded by Ingelin Killengreen
