= Håkon Balstad =

Norwegian civil servant (1904–1964)

Governor of Svalbard
- In office 1945–1956
- Preceded by: Wolmar Tycho Marlow
- Succeeded by: Odd Birketvedt

Personal details
- Born: 12 September 1904; Grue Municipality, Norway
- Died: 30 September 1964 (aged 60); Tenerife, Canary Islands, Spain
- Profession: Civil servant

Hans Håkon Balstad (12 September 1904 – 30 September 1964) was a Norwegian civil servant who served as the Governor of Svalbard from 1945 to 1956. He was the longest-serving person in the position.

== Biography ==
Balstad was born on 12 September 1904 in Grue Municipality in Norway. His father, Stein Balstad, was an author. He finished a law degree in 1928 and then worked as an assistant for a judge for one year. He was a clerk for the Ministry of Church Affairs in 1929 and rose to the position of assistant secretary in 1934. He also was the secretary of the Norwegian Writers' Association from 1930 to 1940. During World War II, he held a high position in the Ministry of Trade, after fleeing the German conquest and evacuating with the rest of the government on 7 June 1940 to London.

After the war, Balstad was appointed towards the end of 1945 to be the first post-war Governor of Svalbard (Sysselmann), a remote archipelago in the Arctic Ocean. He moved there soon after with his fiancée and future wife, Liv Balstad, who subsequently wrote a popular account of her life in Svalbard, titled Nord for det øde hav (North of the desolate sea). Due to Svalbard's small population (which was a few hundred when he was named Governor), in addition to Governor, Balstad also served as notary public, police chief, judge, and county commissioner.

Most of the buildings in Svalbard had been destroyed by the Germans during the war, with only "three or four" houses remaining, according to Governor Balstad's wife. As a result, the primary focus of his early years as governor was reconstruction.[5] Among the destroyed buildings was the governor's residence, forcing Balstad and his wife to live for several years in a "dilapidated ... Swedish barracks, with rats under the floorboards and derelict furniture, which housed all government services as well," according to the book Transit 'Norden' och 'Europa'. Attempts to get assistance from the Norwegian government were unsuccessful, and thus he hired a private architect to build a new governor's residence, which was completed in 1950 in Longyearbyen.

Balstad was described as "respected and popular among the population of Svalbard". Frank Illingworth in Country Life called him a "roaring bull of a man with a fabulous capacity for raw liquor", while an article in The Contemporary Review noted him to be "barrel-chested, with a bellowing voice and a pet husky". The newspaper Nordlys described him as "a very pleasant and sociable man who had won many friends both abroad and at home".

Balstad ending up serving 11 years as Governor of Svalbard, having the longest service in the position before being succeeded by Odd Birketvedt and returning to Norway. After he returned, he became a judge for the Kristiansand District Court. In his last years, he was very ill and he died on 30 September 1964, at the age of 60, while on a trip to Tenerife in the Canary Islands.
