= Kjerstin Askholt =

Norwegian politician

Governor of Svalbard
- In office 1 October 2015 – 24 June 2021
- Preceded by: Odd Olsen Ingerø
- Succeeded by: Lars Fause

Personal details
- Born: 7 May 1962 (age 63) Oslo, Norway

Kjerstin Askholt (born 7 May 1962) is a Norwegian civil servant. She was the governor of Svalbard from 2015 to 2021.

Askholt was the deputy director of Bredtveit Prison from 1990 to 1991, deputy director of the Ministry of Justice from 1996 to 1999, and was from 2003, deputy under-secretary of state at the Polar Department of the Ministry of Justice. She was appointed Governor of Svalbard on 1 October 2015.

Civic offices
| Preceded by Odd Olsen Ingerø | Governor of Svalbard; 2015–2021 | Succeeded by Lars Fause |
