= Office of the Attorney General of Norway =

Established in 1816, the Office of the Attorney General of Norway (Norwegian: Regjeringsadvokatembetet) is the legal advisor to the government. The attorney general assists the executive branch of government with judicial questions and to conduct civil legal trials. The office is a body subordinate to the Norwegian Office of the Prime Minister.

The Director of Public Prosecutions of Norway (Norwegian: Riksadvokaten) is the head of the Norwegian Prosecuting Authority, an independent government agency subordinate only to "King-in-Council" (Council of State (Norway)). The Judge Advocate General of Norway (Norwegian: Generaladvokaten) is the head of the military prosecution authority, and is subordinate to riksadvokaten.

The office has 46 employees (of whom 34 are legal professionals). The current Attorney General of Norway is Fredrik Sejersted, whereas the assisting Attorney General is Tolle Stabell. The headquarters are in Oslo.

== List of attorneys general of Norway ==
This is a list of the heads of the Office of the Attorney General of Norway:

- 1816–1820 : Bredo Henrik von Munthe af Morgenstierne, Sr.
- 1820–1825 : Jonas Anton Hielm
- 1822–1830 : Niels Aars
- 1830–1837 : H. C. Petersen
- 1837–1839 : Frederik Stang
- 1839–1842 : Eskild Bruun
- 1842–1859 : I. W. Skjelderup
- 1859–1870 : Bernhard Dunker
- 1870–1873 : H. C. H. Grønn
- 1873–1893 : Christian Lasson
- 1893–1904 : Johannes Bergh
- 1904–1917 : Karl Lous
- 1917–1923 : Annæus J. Schjødt
- 1924–1939 : Kristen Johanssen
- 1939–1941 : Valentin Voss
- 1941–1945 : German occupation of Norway
- 1945–1962 : Henning Bødtker
- 1962–1972 : Hans Methlie Michelsen
- 1972–1993 : Bjørn Haug
- 1993–2015 : Sven Ole Fagernæs
- 2015-present : Fredrik Sejersted
