= Lars Fause =

Norwegian civil servant (born 1965)

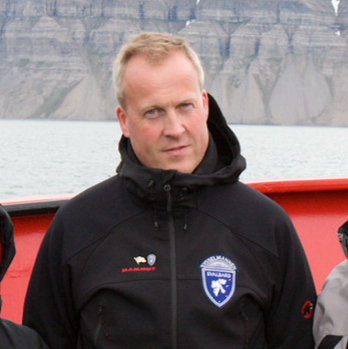
- Fause in 2010

Governor of Svalbard
- Incumbent
- Assumed office 24 June 2021
- Preceded by: Kjerstin Askholt

Personal details
- Born: 20 February 1965 (age 61) Balsfjord, Norway
- Spouse: Anett Beatrix Osnes
- Education: University of Tromsø (M.S.L.)

Lars Fause (born 20 February 1965) is a Norwegian prosecutor and civil servant serving as the governor of Svalbard since 2021.

== Early life and education ==
Fause is originally from Balsfjord Municipality in Troms county. Fause graduated from the University of Tromsø in 1991 with a Master of Studies in Law. Much of his family lives in Tromsø, where Fause resides when not in Svalbard.

== Career ==
Following his graduation, Fause worked for the Oslo Police District as an assistant. He also worked for a year as a police lawyer for the Troms Police District, and for the following two years at the Trondenes District Court as an assistant judge. Fause worked from 1996 to 2002 as a public prosecutor at the public prosecution offices of Troms og Finnmark, and he received a promotion to the position of chief prosecutor in 2003.

In 2008, Fause accepted a position as deputy governor of Svalbard, which he held until 2011. He made headlines in October 2008 for becoming the first person to deny a person residence in Svalbard: a 28-year-old man who was said to be behind "many crimes". After leaving office, he returned to his former position as chief prosecutor in Troms og Finnmark. He held this position in his second stint from 2011 to 2020, when he resigned to avoid a conflict of interest with his spouse.

Fause took office as governor on 24 June 2021, following the departure of term-limited Governor Kjerstin Askholt. He was selected over several other applicants, including judges Jørn Holme and Cecilie Østensen Berglund. He is limited to a maximum of two terms of three years each, according to the Svalbard Treaty, upon which point he would not be eligible for a third term.

Fause is the first governor of Svalbard to have the gender-neutral title Sysselmester instead of the traditional masculine title Sysselmannen; both words translate to English as 'governor', but the change was required as part of Norway's effort to replace gendered governmental titles.

Civic offices
Preceded by Kjerstin Askholt	Governor of Svalbard; 2021–present	Succeeded by Incumbent
