= Per Sefland =

Norwegian lawyer

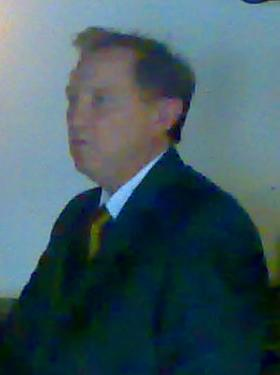
Per Sefland

Per Ottar Sefland (born 27 January 1949) is Norwegian lawyer and civil servant. He was Governor of Svalbard from 1 October 2005 to 16 September 2009.

Sefland was born in Evje Municipality, and his family later moved to Larvik Municipality. He married in 1972, and has two daughters.

He is a lawyer by education (cand.jur., University of Oslo, 1975), and is a career law enforcement civil servant. After studying he was a bureaucrat in the Ministry of Justice from 1975 to 1976, police superintendent in Sunnmøre from 1976 to 1979, deputy judge at the Kristiansund District Court from 1979 to 1980 and chief superintendent in Nordmøre from 1980 to 1982. In 1982 he became acting chief of police of Vest-Finnmark, and in 1984 he became chief of police in Nordmøre. While serving in this position he had short leaves to serve in the Norwegian Prosecuting Authority and as Assisting County Governor of Møre og Romsdal. He also attended the NATO Defense College in Rome in 1997 and the Norwegian National Defence College in 1986.

In 1997 he was hired as director of the Norwegian Police Surveillance Service, which was named the Norwegian Police Security Service in 2001. From 2003 to 2005 he worked as a chief of police without portfolio in the National Police Directorate, and in 2005 he became the new Governor of Svalbard. He was preceded by Odd Olsen Ingerø and immediately by acting governor Sven Ole Fagernæs. He was succeeded by Odd Olsen Ingerø, who then served a second term as governor.

Police appointments
| Preceded by Ellen Holager Andenæs (acting) | Director of the Norwegian Police Security Service; 1997–2003 | Succeeded by Arnstein Øverkil (acting) |
Civic offices
| Preceded by Sven Ole Fagernæs (acting) | Governor of Svalbard; 2005–2009 | Succeeded by Odd Olsen Ingerø |
