= Hilde Sejersted =

Norwegian philologist

Hilde Sejersted, née Robberstad (born 19 May 1941) is a Norwegian philologist and teacher.

She spent her professional career as a teacher of history, Latin and Norwegian at Oslo Cathedral School from 1968 to 2008. She has also released two books Om Garman & Worse (1996) and Latinen lenge leve. Sitater og bevingede ord (2011, with Vibeke Roggen). She is a member of the Norwegian Academy for Language and Literature.

In 1964 she married Francis Sejersted, later history professor and chair of the Nobel Committee. They resided at Abbediengen.
