= Odd Blomdal =

Norwegian judge and civil servant

Odd Emil Blomdal (30 January 1927 – 27 September 2015) was a Norwegian judge and civil servant.

He took the cand.jur. degree in 1952, and later took a military education as well as further education in political science and public law. He was a lecturer at the Norwegian Military Academy from 1966 to 1978, presiding judge in the Hålogaland Court of Appeal from 1978 to 1980 and Judge Advocate General for the Norwegian Armed Forces from 1980 to 1988. From 1988 he was a presiding judge in the Eidsivating Court of Appeal. He was then Norway's Governor of Svalbard between 1991 and 1995. From 1996 to his retirement he was employed as extraordinary presiding judge in the Borgarting Court of Appeal. He lived in Oslo. He died in 2015.

Military offices
Preceded by Eystein Wiggen (acting)	Judge Advocate General for the Norwegian Armed Forces; 1980–1988	Succeeded by Arne Willy Dahl
Civic offices
Preceded by Leif Eldring	Governor of Svalbard; 1991–1995	Succeeded by Ann-Kristin Olsen
