= Carl Alexander Wendt =

Norwegian police chief and civil servant

Carl Alexander Wendt (13 January 1923 – 2006) was a Norwegian police leader and civil servant.

He was born in Mandal, and took the cand.jur. degree in 1948. After spending the years 1967 to 1982 as chief of police in Sør-Varanger Municipality, Bodø Municipality, and Stavanger Municipality, he served as Governor of Svalbard from 1982 to 1985 and chief of police in Stavanger Municipality from 1986 to 1988.

Civic offices
Preceded by Jan Grøndahl	Governor of Svalbard; 1982–1985	Succeeded by Leif Eldring
