= Governor of Svalbard =

Highest representative of the Norwegian government in Svalbard

- Sysselmesteren på Svalbard
- Logo of the Governor of Svalbard

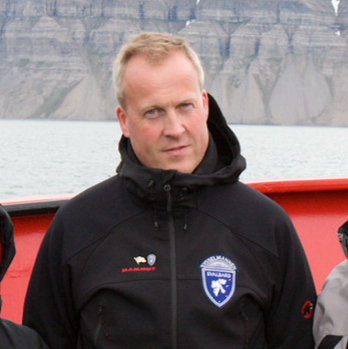
- Incumbent; Lars Fause since 24 June 2021
- Appointer: King-in-Council
- Term length: Three years, renewable once
- Inaugural holder: Johannes Gerckens Bassøe
- Formation: 17 July 1925; 101 years ago
- Website: www.sysselmesteren.no

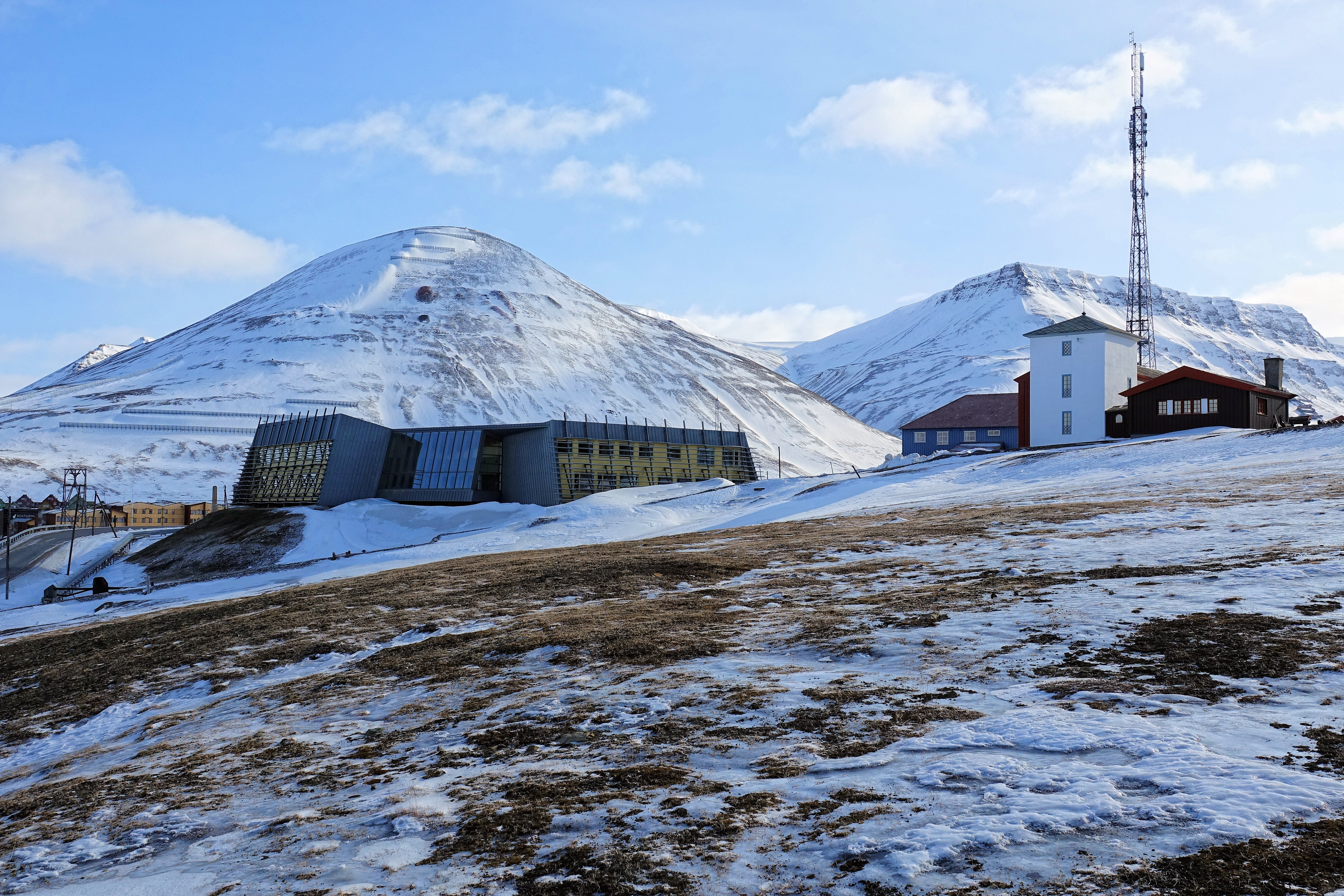
Offices and residence of Sysselmesteren

The governor of Svalbard (Norwegian: Sysselmesteren på Svalbard) represents the Norwegian government in exercising its sovereignty over the Svalbard archipelago (Spitsbergen).

The position reports to the Norwegian Ministry of Justice, but it maintains all Norwegian interests in the area, including environmental protection, law enforcement, representation, mediation, and civil matters, such as marriage and divorce. An important part of the position is maintaining good working relations with the Russian community in Barentsburg.

To this end, the governor's organization consists of:

- a staff section with Russian interpreters and advisors on legal matters, tourism, etc.
- a section for law enforcement
- a section for environmental protection
- an administrative section, including archiving, financial management and IT support

The governor's office also has at its disposition several helicopters, snowmobiles, speedboats, and other equipment needed to meet its responsibilities. The office's annual budget is determined by the Storting and runs at about NOK 60 million, of which the largest part is used for transportation.

The position was previously called Sysselmann in Norwegian until 1 July 2021, when it was changed to Sysselmester. This was part of a wider decision by the Solberg government to replace gender-specific governmental titles in Norway with gender-neutral terms.

== List of governors of Svalbard ==
| Name | Term began | Term ended |
|---|---|---|
| Edvard Lassen | ? | August 1925 |
| Johannes Gerckens Bassøe | August 1925 | 28 July 1933 |
| Helge Ingstad (acting) | 28 July 1933 | 1 September 1935 |
| Wolmar Tycho Marlow | 1 September 1935 | 1941 |
| Vacant | 1941 | 1945 |
| Håkon Balstad | 1945 | 1956 |
| Odd Birketvedt | 1956 | 1960 |
| Finn Backer Midtbøe | 1960 | 1963 |
| Tollef Landsverk | 1963 | 1967 |
| Stephen Stephensen | 1967 | 1970 |
| Fredrik Beichmann | 1970 | 1974 |
| Leif Eldring | 1974 | 1978 |
| Jan Grøndahl | 1978 | 1982 |
| Carl Alexander Wendt | 1982 | 1985 |
| Leif Eldring | 1985 | 1991 |
| Odd Blomdal | 1991 | 1995 |
| Ann-Kristin Olsen | 1995 | 1998 |
| Morten Ruud | 1998 | 2001 |
| Odd Olsen Ingerø | 2001 | 2005 |
| Sven Ole Fagernæs (acting) | 2005 | 1 October 2005 |
| Per Sefland | 1 October 2005 | 16 September 2009 |
| Odd Olsen Ingerø | 16 September 2009 | 1 October 2015 |
| Kjerstin Askholt | 1 October 2015 | 24 June 2021 |
| Lars Fause | 24 June 2021 | Incumbent |
