= Sven Ole Fagernæs =

Norwegian civil servant and jurist

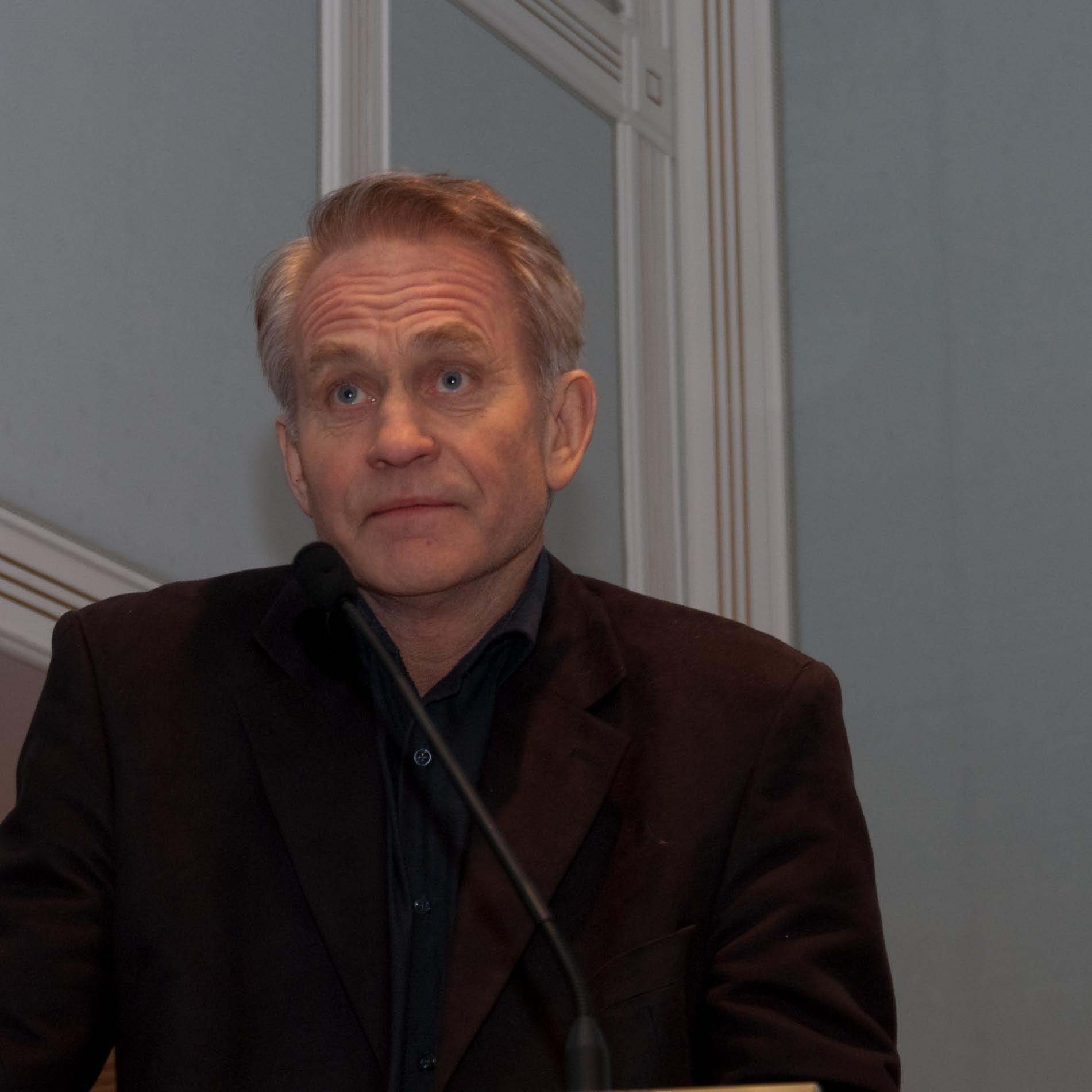
Sven Ole Fagernæs

Sven Ole Fagernæs (born 12 March 1945) is a Norwegian jurist and civil servant who was Attorney General of Norway from 1993 to 2015.

Sven Ole Fagernæs was born in Oslo and got a cand.jur. degree from the University of Oslo in 1972.

He worked for the Norwegian Ministry of Justice and the Police from 1973 to 1976 and in that period also shortly worked as a junior judge at the Indre Sogn magistrate. In 1976 he started working for the Office of the Attorney General of Norway. He became assistant Attorney General of Norway in 1987.

He was the Attorney General of Norway from 1993 to 2015, except for a period from 1998 to 2001 when he was acting permanent under-secretary of state in the Ministry of Justice. He was also acting governor of Svalbard in 2005.

He became a commander of the Order of St. Olav in 2004.

Civic offices
Preceded by Bjørn Haug	Attorney General of Norway; 1994–2015	Succeeded by Fredrik Sejersted
Preceded by Morten Ruud	Permanent under-secretary of state in the Ministry of Justice and the Police (acting); 1998–2001	Succeeded by Morten Ruud
Preceded by Odd Olsen Ingerø	Governor of Svalbard (acting); 2005	Succeeded by Per Sefland
