= Russenorsk =

Extinct Russian–Norwegian pidgin

- Russonorsk
- Region: Northern Norway
- Era: 18th–20th centuries
- Language family: Russian–Norwegian pidgin

Language codes
- ISO 639-3: None (mis)
- Linguist List: qcu
- Glottolog: russ1267

Russenorsk (Norwegian pronunciation: [ˈrʉ̂sːəˌnɔʂk]; Russian: руссено́рск, [rʊsʲɪˈnorsk]; English: Russo-Norwegian) is an extinct dual-source "restricted pidgin" language formerly used in the Arctic, which combined elements of Russian and Norwegian. Russenorsk originated from Russian traders from Kola (north-western Russia) and Norwegian fishermen from Tromsø (northern Norway). It was used extensively in Northern Norway for about 150 years in the Pomor trade.

As is common in the development of pidgins and trade languages, the interaction of fishermen and traders with no common language necessitated the creation of some minimal form of communication. Like all pidgins, Russenorsk had a rudimentary grammar and a restricted vocabulary, mostly composed of words essential to Arctic fishing and trade (fish, weather, etc.); however, Russenorsk was used outside of fishing and trade context during the off-season as it was not uncommon for Russians to remain in Norway during the winter.

== History ==
Barter existed between Russians and Norwegians for 150 years in Troms and Finnmark counties. This barter was supported by the Norwegian government, and King Christian VII conferred city status to several settlements, such as Tromsø, to facilitate it. Norwegians mainly traded fish for flour and wheat from Russians. The trading went on throughout the sunny months of the year and was beneficial to both sides; Norwegians had access to cheap fish in the summer, whilst Russians had surplus wheat. Traders came from the areas near Murmansk and the White Sea, most often to the towns of Vardø, Hammerfest, and Tromsø, occasionally further south to the Lofoten islands.

The earliest recorded instance of Russenorsk was in 1785. It is one of the most studied northern pidgins; many linguists, for example, Olaf Broch, studied it. Unlike equatorial pidgins, it was formed from only two languages, Norwegian and Russian. Furthermore, these languages are not from the same branch of Indo-European languages. Also unlike equatorial pidgins, Russenorsk was formed within one social class.

Until 1850, Russenorsk was socially acceptable for all social classes. In 1850, Russenorsk became more limited to Norwegian fishermen, whereas Norwegian traders learnt Russian through exposure in Archangelsk and Russian trade centers, often formally studying the language to the extent that they could communicate in rudimentary Russian. This increase in Russian study caused the devaluation of Russenorsk in terms of social status.

In 1917, Finland's declaration of independence from Russia caused the Russian–Norwegian border to decrease significantly. In 1919, the border disappeared completely. Furthermore, the Soviet Union limited international contact significantly, decreasing the need for the common language between Norwegians and Russians. The last such Norwegian–Russian trade occurred in 1923.

== Phonology ==
Russenorsk uses many of the phonemes common to both Norwegian and Russian, altering phonemes only used in one. Pronunciation depended on the language background of the speaker.

- /mn/, absent in Norwegian, became /n/: много ли (mnogo li, 'how many?') → nogoli.
- /x/, absent in Norwegian, became /k/: хорошо (khorosho, 'good') → korosho.
- /h/, absent in Russian, became /g/: hal ('half') → gal.
- final voiced consonants, absent in Russian, became unvoiced: gav ('sea') → gaf

Consonants in Norwegian Russenorsk
	Labial		Dental/ Alveolar		Postalveolar	Palatal	Velar	
Nasal	m		n					
Stop	p	b	t	d			k	ɡ
Fricative	f		s		ʂ	ç		
Approximant	ʋ		l			j		
Flap			ɾ					

Consonants in Russian Russenorsk
	Labial		Dental/ Alveolar		Postalveolar	Palatal	Velar	
Nasal	m		n					
Stop	p	b	t	d			k	ɡ
Affricate			ts			tɕ		
Fricative	f	v	s	z	ʂ			
Approximant			l			j		
Trill					r			

More is known about the Norwegian variety of Russenorsk due to the fact that most of the texts in Russenorsk were written by Norwegians. In the few Russian records of the language, there are examples of both /z/ and /ts/ in the words презентоме (prezentome, 'to give') and принципал (printsipal, 'captain'), for which the Norwegians used /s/. The Russian affricate /tɕ/ in words such as чай (chaj, 'tea') was substituted by the Norwegians with the fricative /ç/.

Vowels
	Front	Central	Back
Close	i		u
Mid	e	ə	o
Open		a	

== Vocabulary ==
Corpora of Russenorsk consist of lists of individual words and phrases as well as records of dialogues compiled by linguists such as Just Knud Qvigstad. The corpora include c. 400 words, about half of which only appear once in the records (so-called hapax legomena); therefore, the vocabulary contained only 150–200 core words.

The origin of its vocabulary is generally held to be approximately 40% Russian and 50% Norwegian, with the remaining 10% from Dutch, Low German, French, English, Sami, and Swedish.

Many words in Russenorsk have a synonym from the other primary language.

- Balduska, kvejta (halibut)
- Muzhik, man (man)
- Eta, den (this)
- Njet, ikke (not)

Some words can be etymologically traced to both Norwegian and Russian, for example, vin (Norwegian) and вино (Russian). Some words have an unclear etymology; for example, tovara or vara could have come from Russian, Swedish, or Finnish.

Some Russenorsk words survive in the dialect of Vardø:

- kralle (Russenorsk: krallom, Russian: красть, romanized: krast', 'to steal')
- klæba (Russian: хлеб, romanized: khleb, 'bread')

== Grammar ==
One of the characteristics differentiating the pidgin from jargon is its grammar; however, Russenorsk did not go through tertiary hybridization. Russenorsk is mainly influenced by Norwegian grammar, leading some to conclude that it is a variant of Norwegian with some Russian influence.

A lack of metalinguistic awareness amongst Russenorsk speakers may have led them to believe they were speaking the language of their interlocutor; that is, that Russians believed they were speaking Norwegian and vice versa.

There are no clear verb conjugations. The main indication of a verb is the suffix -om, for example, kapitan på kajuta slipom (the captain is asleep in his cabin). Nominative nouns usually end with -a. Conjunctions used to make compound sentences or dependent clauses are ja, i, and jes. Kak is used as an interrogative word. The general word order is SVO, with some alterations for questions and sentences with adverbs.

På is used as the only preposition for the oblique case:

- For possession: klokka på ju ('your watch')
- For location: mala penge på lamma ('little money in the pocket'), and principal på sjib? ('Is the captain aboard the ship?')
- For temporal relation: på morradag ('tomorrow'), på gammel ras ('last year').
- For direction: moja tvoja på vater kasstom ('I will throw you in the water'), nogoli dag tvoja reisa på Arkangel otsuda? ('How many days did you travel from here [to get] to Arkhangelsk?'), på Arkangel reisom ('go to Arkhangelsk').

=== Morphology ===
Russenorsk does not have extensive morphology, but has some unique characteristics. The ending -om does not come from Russian nor Norwegian, but it may come from Solombala English. The ending -mann, from Norwegian, is used to indicate nationality or profession, for example russmann ('Russian'), burmann ('Norwegian'), or kukmann ('trader'). Other morphological features are reduplication, such as morra-morradag ('after tomorrow'), and compounding, such as kua ('cow') and sjorta ('shirt') to kuasjorta ('cowhide').

=== Syntax ===
One characteristic syntactical attribute of Russenorsk is the tendency to move the verb to the final position when the sentence has adverbs. This is found in neither Russian nor Norwegian. Another is that the negator (ikke, njet) precedes the verb, but can be separated from the verb. This is unlike negation in either Russian or Norwegian, but it may have come from Finnish, in which this syntax was probable. Moreover, the use of barter-focused language established frequent use of interrogative speech in sentences.

== Examples ==
^{r} marks Russian origin, ^{n} marks Norwegian.

Moja	på	tvoja.
моя́^{r}	på^{n} по^{r} (Note: /po/ in both languages happens to mean 'in' when referring to speaking in a language, though they are pronounced slightly differently.)	твоя́^{r}
my	in	your
'I speak in your language.'

Kak	sprek?	Moja	njet	forsto.
как^{r}	språk^{n}	моя́^{r}	нет^{r}	forstå^{n}
how	speak?	my	no	understand
'What are you saying? I don't understand.'

=== Sentences ===
Moja på tvoja.	I'm talking in your language.
Kak sprek? Moja njet forsto.	What are you talking about? I don't understand.
å råbbåte	work
kleba	bread
Ju sprek på moja kantor kom	You said that you would come to my office.
Tvoja fisk kopom?	Will you buy fish?
Saika kopom i på Arkangelsk på gaf spaserom	I'll buy pollack and we'll swim in Arkhangelsk.
Kak pris? Mangeli kosta?	What is the price? How much?
Eta grot dyr. Værsegod, på minder prodaj!	It is very expensive. Please lower the price!

== See also ==
- Languages of Svalbard
- Kola Norwegians
- Bjarmaland
- Pomors
- Kyakhta Russian–Chinese Pidgin
- Mednyj Aleut language

== Notes and references ==
=== Bibliography ===
- Broch, I. & Jahr, E. H. 1984. Russenorsk: Et pidginspråk i Norge (2. utgave), Oslo: Novus.
- Broch, I. & Jahr, E. H. 1984. "Russenorsk: a new look at the Russo-Norwegian pidgin in northern Norway." In: P. Sture Ureland & I. Clarkson (eds.): Scandinavian Language Contacts, Cambridge: C.U.P., pp. 21–65.
- Jahr, E. H. 1996. "On the pidgin status of Russenorsk", in: E. H. Jahr and I. Broch (eds.): Language contact in the Arctic: Northern pidgins and contact languages, Berlin-New York: Mouton de Gruyter, 107-122.
- Lunden, S. S. 1978. Tracing the ancestry of Russenorsk. Slavia Orientalis 27/2, 213–217.
