= Tollef Landsverk =

Norwegian judge and civil servant

Tollef Landsverk (12 December 1920 – 8 June 1988) was a Norwegian judge and civil servant.

In his early career, he was a police clerk, later, stipendiary magistrate in Stavanger, Skien, and Porsgrunn. He was Norway's Governor of Svalbard between 1963 and 1967. From 1981 he was a presiding judge in Agder Court of Appeal. He died in June 1988.

Civic offices
| Preceded by Finn Backer Midtbøe | Governor of Svalbard; 1963–1967 | Succeeded by Stephen Stephensen |
