= Hotellneset =

Peninsula in Svalbard, Norway

Coordinates: 78°15.0′N 15°29.5′E

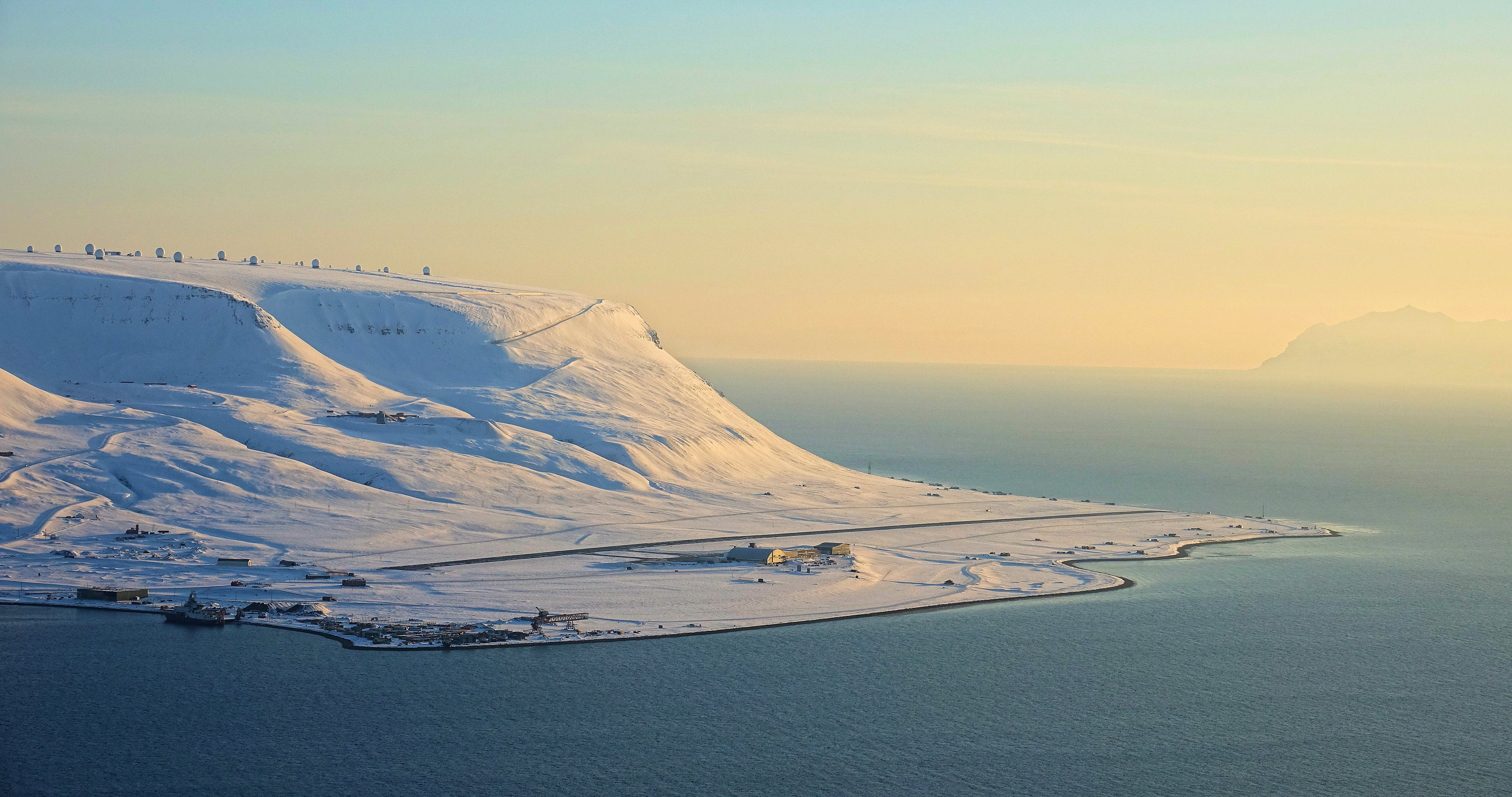
Hotellneset seen from across Adventjorden.

Hotellneset ("Hotel Point") is a peninsula 1 to 2 kilometres (0.62 to 1.24 mi) north-west of Longyearbyen in Svalbard, Norway, sticking out into Adventfjorden. It is the location of Svalbard Airport, Longyear and the port for shipping of coal from Longyearbyen. Above Hotellneset is Platåberget, which is the location for Svalbard Satellite Station.
