= Kyakhta Russian–Chinese Pidgin =

Chinese-Russian pidgin

Kyakhta
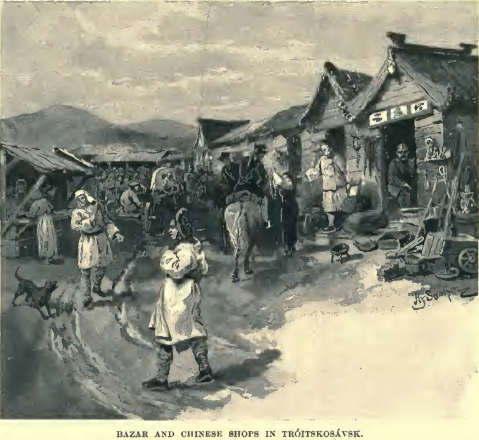
- The Kyakhta bazaar in 1885
- Region: Russian–Chinese border
- Extinct: early 20th century roughly 50 semi speakers
- Language family: Pidgin: Kyakhta

Language codes
- ISO 639-3: None (mis)
- Glottolog: kjac1234
- IETF: crp-u-sd-rubu

Kyakhta Russian–Chinese Pidgin was a contact language that developed in the Russian city of Kyakhta in the late 1700s. The language was developed by Chinese and Russian traders to allow communication between the two groups for trade and social purposes within the city and is noted to have been used for approximately 100 years.

This pidgin was spoken primarily in the town of Kyakhta but was also documented in the Lower Amur region and in the town of Maimachin. It is also known as: Pis’mo iz Kiakhty, Siberian pidgin, Kyakhta pidgin, or the Maimachin speech.

== History ==
=== Contributing trade relations ===
The city of Kyakhta was officially founded in 1727 by the Russian government to allow small, private city-based trade between China and Russia. The city saw a dramatic increase in population and trade in 1757, when the Russian government abolished caravan-based trade between Russia, Mongolia and Peking (now Beijing) and wanted to enforce city-based trade locales. By 1772 Kyakhta was one of the only cities where legal Russian-Chinese trade could be conducted, as a result the cities population was primarily Chinese and Russian traders.

=== Russian-Chinese pidgin formation ===
In order to do business, Chinese traders were expected to have completed a standardized Russian language competency test before entering the city. As for Russian born traders, there was little need to learn Chinese, as trade deals were encouraged to be done in Russian.

While the pidgin did ultimately form for trading purposes the language shifted over to non-trading social use on account from government policies enforcing Russian over any other language. From this, the pidgin was more commonly used by Chinese-traders than Russian locals. However, Russian locals were also noted to speak the pidgin, on account of maintaining social relations as well as city culture.

==== Notable historic accounts ====
Peter Simon Pallas was an academic who passed through Kyakhta in 1772 and made notes in his journals about a "broken" Russian being spoken and that doing business within the city often required a translator who could speak said "broken" Russian.

Carl Ritter was a German based geographer who was noted to be passing through Kyakhta sometime in the 1830s. Ritter wrote that the Chinese merchants he encountered had phonetic peculiarities when pronouncing Russian words and described a unique dialect in the city.

Sergej Cherepanov was a Russian academic who also made note of a probable Russian Pidgin being used in 1853. He remarked that Chinese traders were reliant on using Russian phrase books, hua ben’s (phrase books), to communicate trading needs and accounted for their unique speech patterns. Cherepanov also noted how Chinese-traders would try to "break" their spoken Russian with the use of this language by means of protesting trade-policies. Cherepanov also claimed that Russian-Chinese pidgin could have been used as early as 1703, however his accounts were noted to be ambiguous, lacking dates and viable evidence.

== Decreolization ==
Over its lifespan, the pidgin was noted to have little prestige among Russian officials, resulting in the lowering of its status and its decline in use. The Russian government made notable pushes to standardize Russian and to ensure it as the lingua franca within the city in the late 1800s. Anyone wishing to immigrate to or conduct business in Russia, from the 1800s onward, was required to have basic comprehension of the Russian language. This contributed to the loss of the Russian-Chinese pidgin (decreolization) through means of corpus planning at the hands of the Russian government, by ensuing that all residents spoke, conducted business in and were taught standard Russian.

As with most extinct pidgin languages, there is no exact date as to when the language stopped being used. Most scholars and historians only have speculation as to when it officially was phased out and most records argue it existed for no more than 100 years.

== Pidgin structure ==
The lexifier language is Russian with the substrate being Chinese. However, there are notable borrow words from Mongolian and Tungusic languages as a result of multi-lingual Chinese traders and previous Mongolian marriages.

The Russian-Chinese pidgin is characterized by epenthetic vowels to maintain the structure similar to Chinese, and the dropping of gender-marking cases, loss of case and inflectional verbs notable to Russian imperative.

== Phonology ==
Consonants
		Bilabial	Labiodental	Labial–velar	Dental/ Alveolar	Palatal- alveolar	Palatal	Velar	Uvular
Plosive	voiceless	p (pʰ)			t (tʰ)			k (kʰ)	(q)
Plosive	voiced	b			d			g	
Nasal		m			n		ɲ	ŋ	
Trill					(r)				
Tap/Flap					(ɾ)				
Fricative	voiceless	ɸ			(s)	ʃ		x	(χ)
Fricative	voiced	β	(v)		(z)	(ʒ)			
Affricative	voiceless				(ts)	tʃ			
Affricative	voiced				(dz)	dʒ			
Approximant				(w)	l		j		

Some consonants had different variants depending mainly on the speaker's native language and surrounding sounds:

- Chinese speakers sometimes pronounced the voiceless plosives as affricated.
- Tungusic speakers tended to pronounce the velar consonants /k/ and /x/ as uvular [q] and [χ].
- /tʃ/ was sometimes pronounced [ts], while /dʒ/ was sometimes pronounced [ʒ] or [dz].
- [v] was only used by Russians. Others pronounced it as [β] before back vowels and /a/, and [w] otherwise.
- The dental fricatives were only used by Russians.
- /l/ could alternatively be pronounced as a trill [r] or flap [ɾ].

Vowels
	Front	Central	Back
Close	i	ɯ~ə	u
Mid	e	ɯ~ə	o
Open		a	

[ɯ] and [ə] were allophones in stressed and unstressed syllables, respectively.

Due to the absence of consonant clusters in Chinese and their quite frequent occurrence in Russian, the need for epenthesis – adding additional sounds to words – arises to make pronunciation easier. Thus, the following transformations are typical:

Russian word	Russian pronunciation	Kyakhtian pronunciation	English translation
прошу	[ˈproʂʊ]	[poˈroʂʊ]	(I) ask
солнце	[ˈsont͡sɨ]	[ˈsolenɨt͡sɨ]	sun
шампанское	[ʂɐmˈpanskəjə]	[ʂɐmˈpanɛsɨkɪ]	sparkling wine

In a number of words, the stop consonants [d] and [t] and the affricate [ts] transform to the fricative [z]:

Russian word	Russian pronunciation	Kyakhtian pronunciation	English translation
спереди	[ˈspʲerʲɪdʲɪ]	[ˈpjerjza]	in front
халат	[xɐˈlat]	[xɐˈlaza]	dressing gown
поклониться	[pəklɐˈnʲit͡sə]	[pəkələˈniza]	to bow

== Vocabulary ==
Most of the words in the Kyakhta pidgin come from Russian. Many of them, in particular those that do not have consonants clusters, undergo no change; for example, воля ("will"), люди ("people"), мало ("little"), надо ("it is necessary"), рубаха ("shirt"), сюда ("to here"), чужой ("alien"), шуба ("fur coat").

As a rule, pidgins have limited grammar and vocabulary. To compensate for this, words are often borrowed with additional meanings. In Kyakhta pidgin, for instance, the adverb мало, along with the meaning of "little" that it has in Russian, also means "not only"; посиди means not only "to seat", but also "to converse". An example of significant difference between the Russian meaning and the meaning in Kyakhta pidgin is the word месяца – it means "months" in Russian, but "forever" in the pidgin.

The predominantly colloquial origin of words is very noticeable. Many words are present in exclusively diminutive form: женушеки ("woman") comes from Russian жёнушка, the diminutive form of жена ("wife"); рюмашека ("wine glass") comes from Russian рюмашка, the diminutive form of рюмка; беленеки ("white") comes from Russian беленький, the diminutive form of белый.

While Russian is clearly the main source of vocabulary, some words are borrowed from Mongolian which was spoken in the same region, such as адали ("exactly"), and бичиху ("to write") from бичих. Still, the influence of Mongolian is minimal.

The only significant contribution of Mandarin Chinese to the vocabulary is the word фуза meaning "store, shop" (Mandarin 鋪子 (pùzi). Aside from that, Kyakhta pidgin contains several new compounds that could have been inspired by Chinese:

- ума-конейчайло ("madness," literally "end-of-mind") instead of Russian сумашествие.
- середеце-шило ("hard-heartedness", literally "heart-awl") instead of Russian жестокосердие
- языка-меда ("eloquence", literally "tongue-honey") instead of Russian красноречие.

== Morphology ==
Like most pidgins, Kyakhta pidgin lacks many morphological categories: there are no cases, numbers or gender of nouns.

Russian pidgins in general tend to have clear verb indications. In Kyakhta Pidgin, similarly to other Siberian pidgins, most verbs have ending -j/-i: болей ("to be sick"), выгони ("to turn out"), захорони ("to bury"), гоняй ("to drive"), незнай ("to be unaware"), ругай ("to scold"), сади' ("to seat"). This ending makes verbs similar to the imperative form of Russian verbs: for example, болей is the Russian verb болеть ("to be sick"), but in the imperative mood. We can speculate that such forms prevailed when Russians addressed their interlocutors.

During the late stages of the pidgin, the indicators of verb tenses appear: было indicates the past tense, буду indicates the future tense, еса indicates the present tense; for example, погули было means "to have walked", погули еса means "to be walking", погули буду means "will walk".

An object is identified with за, a preposition from the Russian language that has many semantic properties. It is the only preposition present in the Kyakhta pidgin and it is used in the following way: за наша походи means "come to us" (приходи к нам in proper Russian), за наша фуза means "in our store" (в нашем магазине in proper Russian).

Russian pronouns came into the pidgin in an exclusively possessive form: моя ("I") means "mine" in Russian, твоя ("you") means "yours" in Russian, and ево ("he") comes from Russian его, which means "his" in Russian. This feature is shared with the Norwegian-Russian pidgin Russenorsk. All declensions of pronouns are formed with the already mentioned за: за-моя, за-твоя, за-ево.

== Sample text ==
Russian–Chinese Pidgin	English
Xeczu familii chiwo-chiwo kupi-la, kurica jajcy kupi-la, butyka apuskaj-la. Eta mamyka serdica iwo kurica jajcy eta lamaj. Gawari: “Ni-nada butyka pusykaj jajcy, pyrawina pusykaj chachyka”. Xeczu lisa kupi-la, lisa kupi-la, chachyka pusykaj-la, lisa puloba-la.	Xeczu by name bought something, he bought chicken eggs and put them into a bottle. His mother got angry, because all the eggs broke. She said: “You must not put eggs into a bottle; you should have put them into a basket”. Xeczu bought rice, he bought rice and put it into a basket, all the rice got spilled.

== See also ==
- Mednyj Aleut language
- Russenorsk
