= Morten Ruud =

Norwegian civil servant (born 1950)

Morten Ruud (born 25 February 1950) is a Norwegian civil servant.

== Education ==
Morton Ruud graduated in 1974 from the University of Oslo, and attended the Norwegian National Defence College in 1985.

== Civil service ==
From 1976, he has spent most of his career in the Ministry of Justice and the Police, except for the years 1977 to 1978, when he was a deputy judge, and the years 1998 to 2001 when he was the Governor of Svalbard. In the Ministry of Justice, he was promoted to deputy under-secretary of state in 1990, special adviser on 1 January 1997, and then permanent under-secretary of state on 22 August 1997. He left as permanent under-secretary of state in 2012.

== Controversy ==
While serving in Svalbard, Ruud and his Deputy Governor Rune Bård Hansen expelled three young men from Svalbard, invoking—for the first time in history—a 1976 provision, that allowed for expulsion of convicted felons if deemed liable to commit new criminal acts. Ruud was criticized as "almighty" by the commentator of Verdens Gang. Nordlys described the event as "embarrassing and unworthy" bullying.

Civic offices
Preceded by Rakel Surlien	Permanent under-secretary of state in the Ministry of Justice and the Police; 1997–1998	Succeeded by Sven Ole Fagernæs (acting)
Preceded by Ann-Kristin Olsen	Governor of Svalbard; 1998–2001	Succeeded by Odd Olsen Ingerø
Preceded by Sven Ole Fagernæs (acting)	Permanent under-secretary of state in the Ministry of Justice and the Police; 2001–2012	Succeeded by Tor Saglie
