= Ann-Kristin Olsen =

Norwegian jurist and civil servant

Governor of Vest-Agder
- In office 1998–2015
- Preceded by: Oluf Skarpnes
- Succeeded by: Stein Ytterdahl

Governor of Svalbard
- In office 1995–1998
- Preceded by: Odd Blomdal
- Succeeded by: Morten Ruud

Personal details
- Born: 29 March 1945 (age 81) Stockholm, Sweden
- Citizenship: Norway
- Spouse: Henrik Rolf Pettersen
- Education: Cand.jur. (1972)
- Profession: Civil servant

Ann-Kristin Olsen (born 29 March 1945) is a Norwegian jurist and civil servant. Known as the first female chief of police in Norway, and the first female Governor of Svalbard. She served as County Governor of Vest-Agder from 1998 until her retirement in 2015.

== Early life ==
She was born in Stockholm shortly before the end of World War II; her mother chose to give birth here due to the wartime German occupation of Norway. The family soon moved to Kristiansand, and Olsen grew up there. After finishing her secondary education at Kristiansand Cathedral School in 1965, she enrolled in law studies, graduating with the Cand.jur. degree in 1972. In her young days, she reportedly attended the first International Women's Day parade in Oslo.

== Career ==
She worked as a deputy judge in Indre Follo District Court from 1975 to 1976, and after switching to the local police force, she became the first female police inspector in the district. In 1983 she became the first female chief of police in the whole of Norway, stationed in the city of Halden. In this position she was responsible for investigating the large murder case in Tistedalen.

From 1995 to 1998 she was Norway's Governor of Svalbard, again being the first woman to hold the position. She had to cope with several accidents, including the consuming of her headquarters by fire, the 1996 Vnukovo Airlines Flight 2801 disaster and the Barentsburg mining disaster of 1997. In 1998, at the expiration of her pre-designated period, she was appointed as the new County Governor of Vest-Agder. In 2006 she was decorated as a Commander of the Royal Norwegian Order of St. Olav for her work.

She has been the chair of Crown Prince and Crown Princess' Humanitarian Fund, vice chair of Kings Bay AS and Bjørnøen AS and board member of the Norwegian Air Ambulance Foundation, the Norwegian Police University College and the University of Tromsø. She has also been a member of the Council of Europe Committee to oversee the Convention on the Protection of Children against Sexual Exploitation and Sexual Abuse, and is the deputy leader of the Norwegian Criminal Cases Review Commission. In this position, she has voted against a review of the espionage case of Arne Treholt.

She is married to teacher Henrik Rolf Pettersen since 1974, has two children, and resides in Kristiansand.

Government offices
Preceded by Odd Blomdal	Governor of Svalbard; 1995–1998	Succeeded by Morten Ruud
Preceded by Oluf Skarpnes	County Governor of Vest-Agder; 1998–2015	Succeeded by Stein Ytterdahl
