= Georg Wallace =

Norwegian politician (1804–1890)

Georg Wallace (6 June 1804 – 20 February 1890) was a Norwegian politician who served one term as a member of parliament from 1851 to 1853.

== Background ==
Wallace belonged to a well-established family of merchants in Bergen, that was descended from an early 18th-century Scottish immigrant to Norway, George Sanderson Wallace (1689–1719) of Banff, Aberdeenshire, who became a merchant and ship's captain in Bergen in 1711. Georg Wallace was the father of Georg Wallace (1833–1894), a grain and fish merchant whose daughter Ellen Wallace was the maternal grandmother of Roald Dahl.

== Career ==
He was by profession a master baker and later a merchant in his hometown.

He was elected to the Norwegian Parliament in 1851, representing the constituency of Bergen. He served only one term.

== Literature ==
- Tallak Lindstøl: Stortinget og Statsraadet 1814–1914. Kristiania, 1914. Vol. 1 part 2, p. 935.
