= Hans Biørn Wenneberg =

Norwegian politician

Hans Biørn Wenneberg (17 September 1804 – 28 May 1878) was a Norwegian politician.

He was born in Kragerø in Bratsberg county, where he later worked as a merchant and ship-owner. In 1855 and 1857 he was the mayor of Kragerø. He was elected to the Parliament of Norway in 1848, 1851 and 1854, representing the constituency of Kragerø.
