= Fuglefjella Important Bird Area =

Norwegian wildlife area

Coordinates: 78°13′N 15°15′E

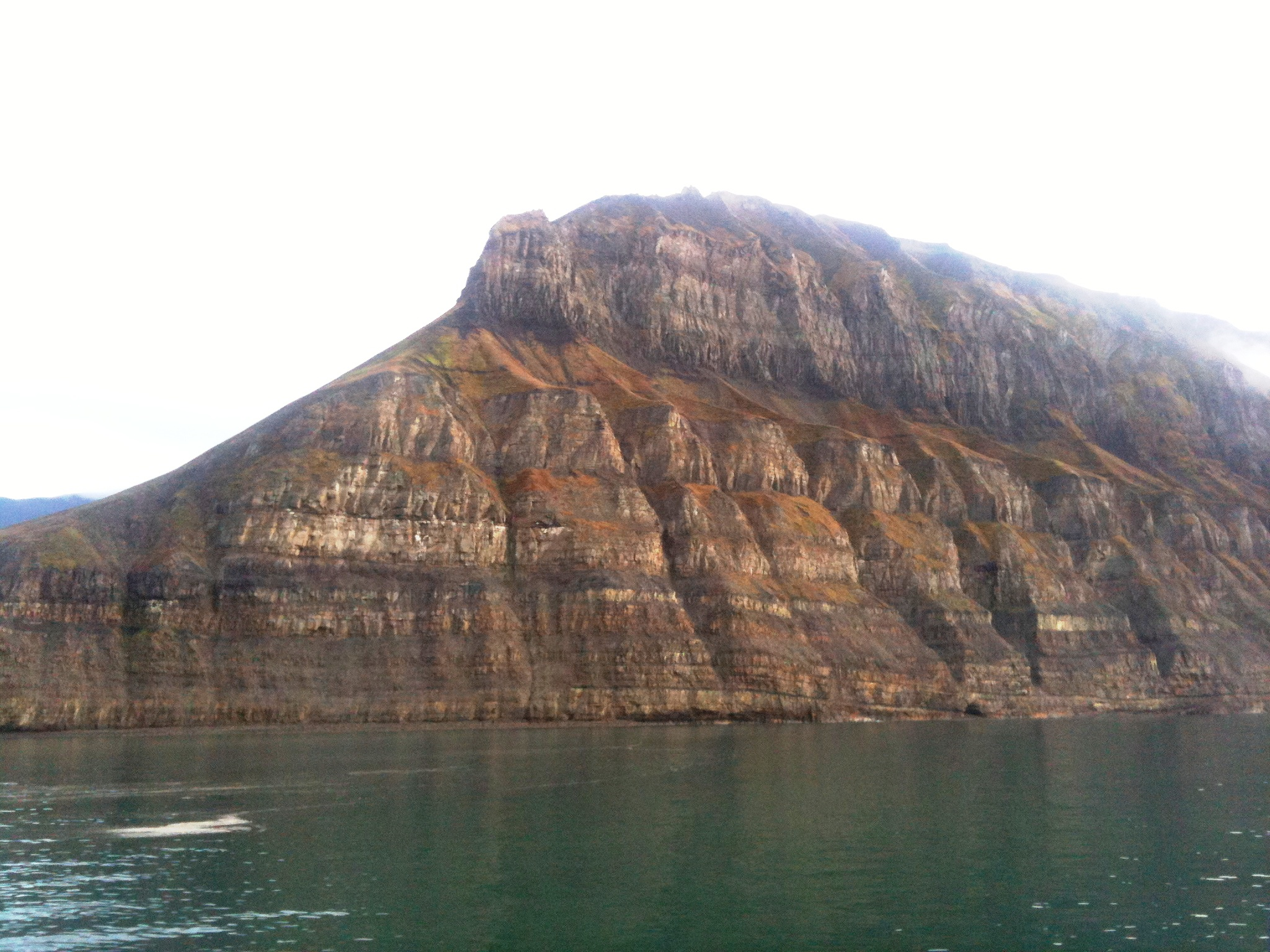

The Fuglefjella Important Bird Area is a 500 ha tract of sea-cliffs in Spitsbergen, the largest island of Norway’s arctic Svalbard archipelago. The cliffs rise from sea level to an elevation of 470 m on the southern side of the inlet of Isfjorden, some 10 km west of the territory's principal human settlement of Longyearbyen. It was identified as an Important Bird Area (IBA) by BirdLife International because it supports about 20,000 breeding pairs of several species of seabirds such as little auks, fulmars, and the Svalbard rock ptarmigan.
