= Languages of Svalbard =

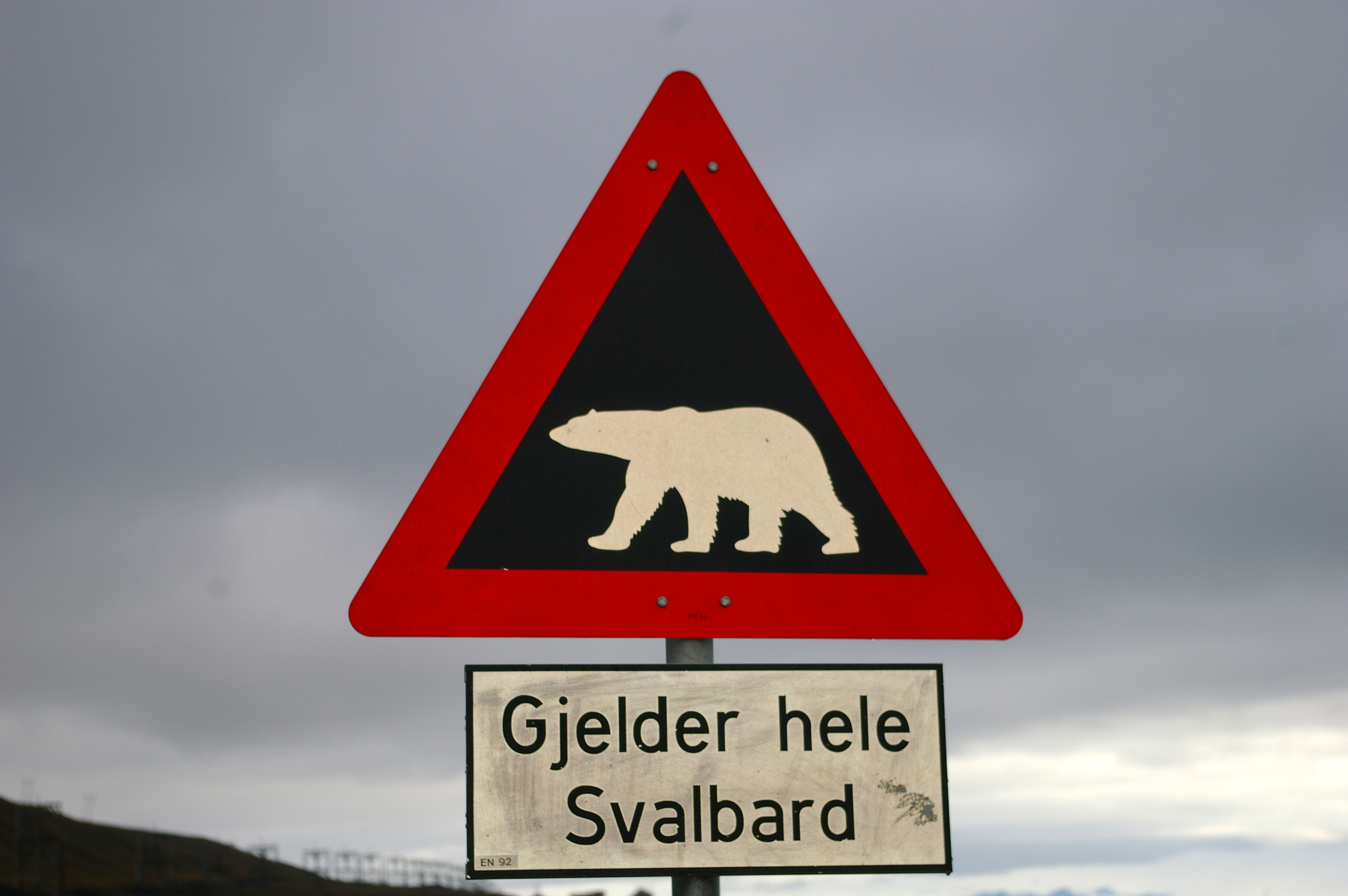
- Polar bear warning sign in Norwegian, Svalbard
- Official: Norwegian
- Immigrant: Russian, Mandarin, Polish
- Foreign: English
- Signed: Norwegian Sign Language
- Keyboard layout: Norwegian QWERTY

Svalbard has a population of approximately 2,904 people as of 2026. Approximately 70% of the people are Norwegians; the remaining 30% are Russian and Ukrainian. The official language of Svalbard is Norwegian. Russian is used in the Russian settlements.

The annual population growth is −0.02%, but as may be seen from the following chart, the ex-Soviet population has atrophied, while the Norwegians have been increasing.

Population of Svalbard
| Year | Total | Norwegian | Russian | Polish |
|---|---|---|---|---|
| 1990 | 3,544 | 1,125 | 2,407 | 12 |
| 1995 | 2,906 | 1,218 | 1,679 | 9 |
| 2000 | 2,376 | 1,475 | 893 | 8 |
| 2005 | 2,400 | 1,645 | 747 | 8 |
| 2010 | 2,541 | 2,083 | 449 | 9 |
| 2015 | 2,681 | 2,203 | 468 | 10 |
| 2020 | 2,898 | 2,433 | 455 | 10 |
| 2024 | 2,958 | 2,608 | 340 | 10 |

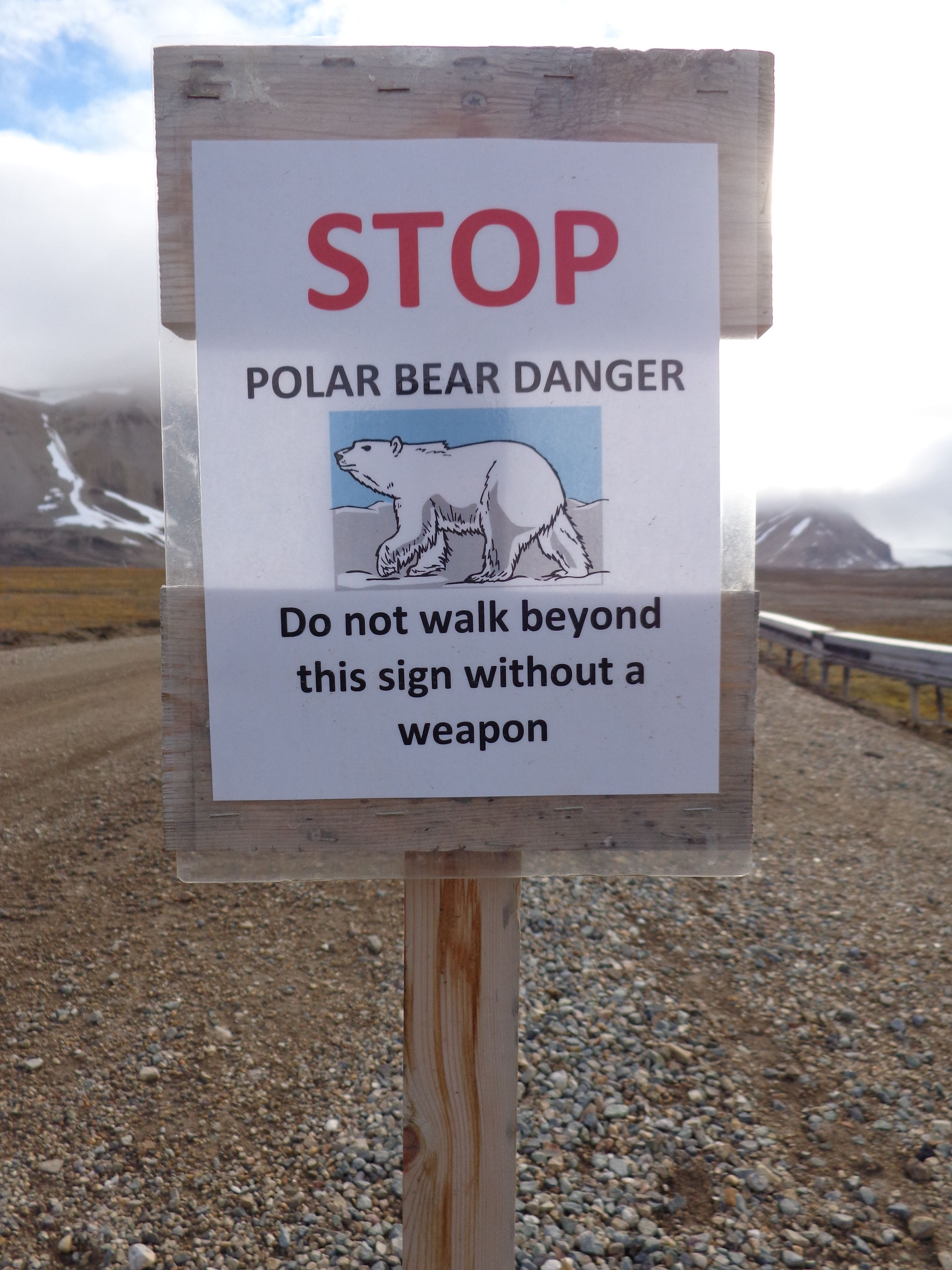
Warning sign in English in Ny-Alesund; English is used as a lingua franca by non-Norwegians in Svalbard.

== Norwegian ==
Norwegian is the official, and main language, of the archipelago. The weekly Svalbardposten is published in it.

Mainly Norwegian-speaking settlements include Longyearbyen, the capital, Ny-Ålesund and Sveagruva.

== Polish ==
Polish Polar Station is located at Hornsund.

== Russian ==
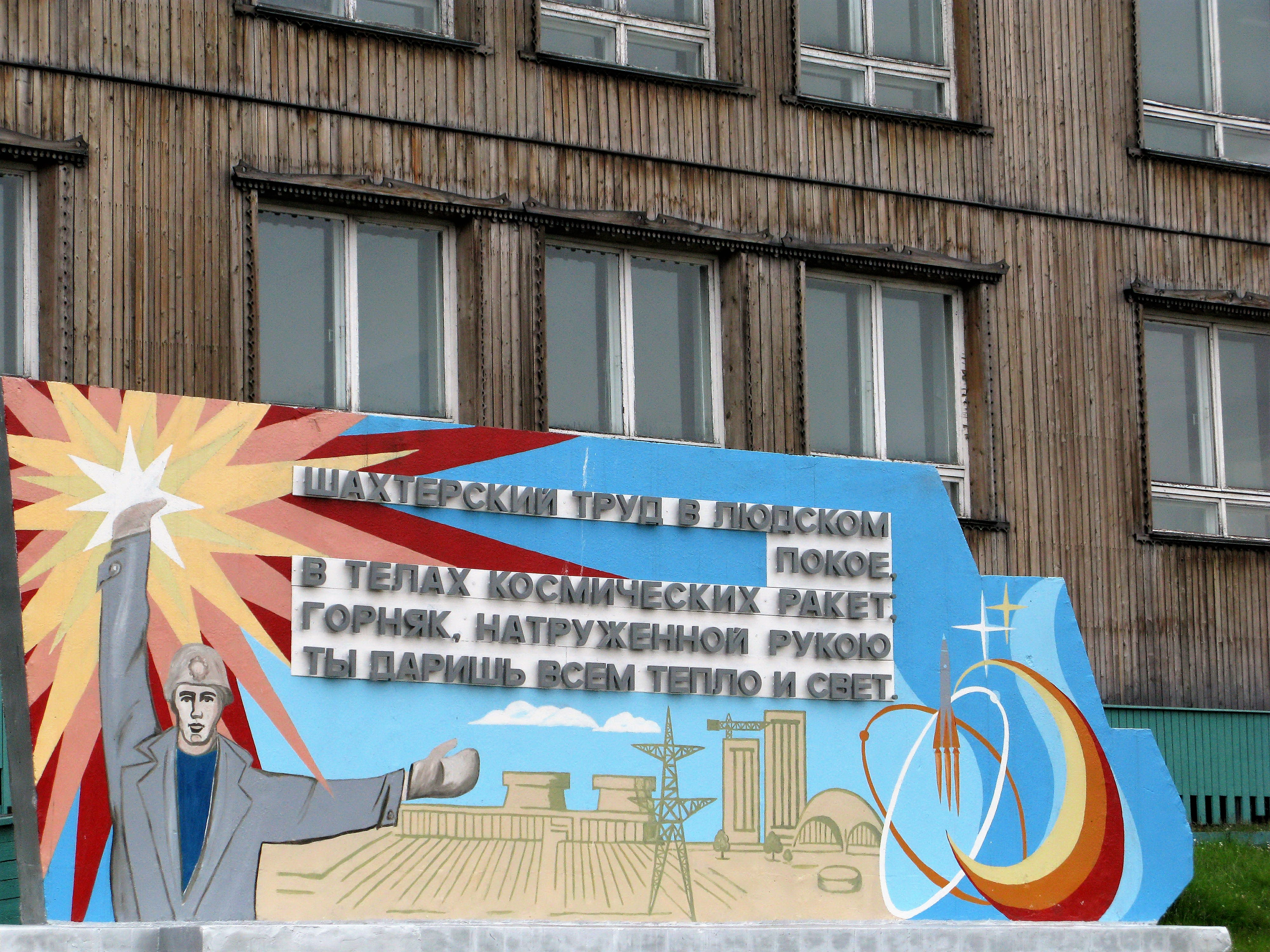
An example of the use of Russian on a monument at Barentsburg

Mainly Russian-speaking settlements include Barentsburg.

Some Russian is spoken in Svalbard's capital, Longyearbyen, and appears in some signage.

Abandoned communities which spoke Russian include Grumant until 1961, and Pyramiden until 2000.

== Chinese ==
The Arctic Yellow River Station was established in 2003, by the People's Republic of China.

== Basque ==
Several Basque whaling expeditions were sent to Svalbard starting in 1612 and ending 1637, they used Euskara but also spoke other languages such as English, Dutch, French, and Danish.

== Dutch ==
Smeerenburg was Dutch-speaking until about 1660. The name itself is Dutch for "blubber town". There was also a Dutch whaling station on Ytre Norskøya and several other locations in Svalbard as well.

The Netherlands still retains a research station at Ny-Ålesund.

== Danish ==
The Danes were also present at Smeerenburg from 1619–23, 1625 and 1631. They also built a seasonal settlement in Kobbefjorden, which they occupied for a quarter century (1631–58).

== English ==
English was spoken from the many whaling settlements established in Svalbard from 1611 to 1670.

== French ==
French was spoken at the whaling settlement in Hamburgbukta, which was occupied from 1633 to 1638. France now maintains a research station at Ny-Ålesund.

== German ==
In 1899, Bjørnøya was claimed by the German journalist and adventurer Theodor Lerner, who visited the island in 1898 and 1899 and claimed rights of ownership. In 1899, the Reichsamt des Innern dispatched a team under the pretext that the journey was for hydrographic and oceanographic research under the German fishery association Deutscher Seefischerei-Verein (DSV), which started investigations of whaling and fishery in the Barents Sea, and considered the possibility of an occupation of Bear Island.

During WW2, the Kriegsmarine did several operations in Svalbard, such as Operation Haudegen, Knospe, Operation Zitronella and Kreuzritter; and founded several weather stations like Taaget, Nussbaum, Helhus and Landvik. Evidently, they spoke German and were the last German troops to surrender after the Second World War.

Germany still maintains a research stations at Ny-Ålesund.

== Spanish ==
The Spanish Empire claimed that Svalbard was a free zone under mare liberum, and several expeditions were done by Non-Basque Spaniards

== Swedish ==
Swedish and Norwegian are mutually comprehensible to a considerable degree.

Pyramiden, which later became Soviet, was founded by a Swedish company in 1910.

== Other languages ==
At present, the United Kingdom, France, Germany, Italy, Japan, South Korea, China, India, and the Netherlands all maintain research stations at Ny-Ålesund, although not all are inhabited year-round. France and Germany do not have independent bases as they share the same AWIPEV Research Base.

== Former and extinct languages ==
The history of Russenorsk or Russonorsk (Norwegian for "Russo-Norwegian") is mainly limited to the 18th and 19th centuries. The Russian Revolution of 1917 brought about an end to its use; it is reported that the last Norwegian–Russian trade occurred in 1923, marking the last use of Russenorsk.

Russenorsk was a pidgin language combining elements of Russian and Norwegian, created by traders and whalers from northern Norway and the Russian Kola Peninsula. Another name for the language was Moja på tvoja that parodied a perverted Russian phrase, meaning something like "I can speak in your language" (from the Russian words моя (moya) "my", по (po) here used to mean "in" твоя (tvoya) "your").
