= Eskild Bruun =

Norwegian jurist

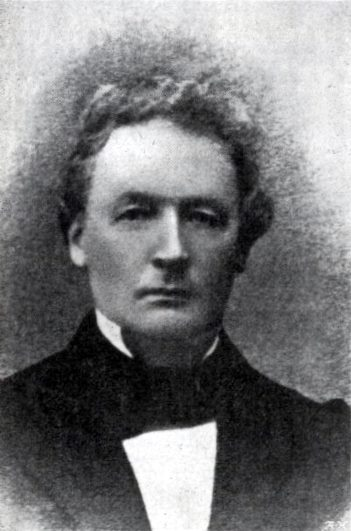
- Born: 12 October 1804; Kristiansand
- Died: 9 October 1877 (aged 72); Kristiania
- Occupations: Barrister, judge and businessman
- Known for: Attorney General of Norway
- Relatives: Jørgen Young (father-in-law)
- Awards: Order of St. Olav (1855, 1865)

Eskild Bruun (12 October 1804 – 9 October 1877) was a Norwegian barrister, judge and businessman.

== Personal life ==
Bruun was born in Kristiansand on 12 October 1804, a son of merchant Arnt Bruun and Johanne Louise Askildsen. From 1836 he was married to Dorothea Marie Young, a daughter of wholesaler Jørgen Young. He died in Kristiania on 9 October 1877.

== Career ==
Bruun graduated as cand.jur. in 1828, and was barrister with access to work with the Supreme Court from 1835. He served as Attorney General of Norway from 1839 to 1842. In 1843 he was appointed judge in the Supreme Court. Also a businessman, he was co-founder of the commercial bank Den norske Creditbank in 1857, and chairman of the board until 1865.

== Awards ==
He was decorated Knight, First Class of the Order of St. Olav in 1855, and Commander in 1865.

Civic offices
Preceded by Frederik Stang	Attorney General of Norway; 1839–1842	Succeeded by Jacob Worm Skjelderup
