= Jacob Worm Skjelderup =

Norwegian politician (1804–1863)

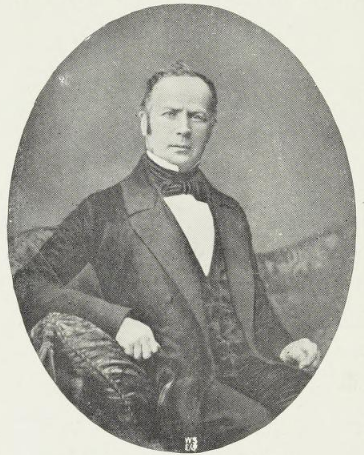

Jacob Worm Skjelderup (3 December 1804 – 2 September 1863) was a Norwegian civil servant and politician who held several high-ranking roles in government during the mid-19th century. He served as Norway's state secretary from 1859 until his death in 1863. In 1860, he was appointed Minister of the Navy, and in 1861, he briefly served as a temporary councillor of state. Skjelderup played a key role in the administration during a period of growing national identity and governmental development in Norway under the union with Sweden.

Civic offices
| Preceded by Eskild Bruun | Attorney General of Norway; 1842–1859 | Succeeded by Bernhard Dunker |
