= Jens Christian Folkman Schaanning =

Norwegian politician (1804–1886)

Jens Christian Folkman Schaanning (11 January 1804 – 13 September 1886) was a Norwegian politician.

He worked as a vicar (sogneprest) in Christianssund. He was elected to the Norwegian Parliament in 1848, representing the constituency of Christianssund og Molde (now Kristiansund in the Nordmøre district of Møre og Romsdal. He was later re-elected in 1851 and 1859.
