= Solombala Shipyard =

Shipyard in Arkhangelsk, Russia

Coordinates: 64.59°N 40.504°E

Solombala Shipyard (Russian: Соломбальская верфь, romanized: Solombal'skaya verf') was the main shipyard servicing Arkhangelsk, Russia. It engaged in shipbuilding from 1693 to 1862, and ship repair from 1887. The town of Arkhangelsk was Russia's main seaport until the early 18th century, when Saint Petersburg was established.

The establishment of the Solombala yard by Peter the Great in 1693 marked the beginning of Russian shipbuilding on a sustained basis. Despite its remoteness and harsh climate, the Arkhangelsk region provided a number of advantages for the shipbuilding industry, such as cheap and abundant timber and access to the iron-ore deposits of the Urals. Between 1702 and 1855, the Solombala shipyard completed 247 vessels.

It was closed in 1862 when most shipbuilding work was transferred to Saint Petersburg, but it was reopened in 1887 as a ship repair yard. The yard became known as Krasnaya Kuznitsa (Russian: Красная Кузница, lit. 'Red Forge') in Soviet times. It is now part of the United Shipbuilding Corporation group.
