= Odd Olsen Ingerø =

Norwegian civil servant

Governor of Svalbard
- In office 16 September 2009 – 1 October 2015
- Preceded by: Per Sefland
- Succeeded by: Kjerstin Askholt
- In office 2001–2005
- Preceded by: Morten Ruud
- Succeeded by: Sven Ole Fagernæs (acting)

Personal details
- Born: 22 September 1950 (age 74); Skjeberg, Norway

Odd Olsen Ingerø (born 22 September 1950) is a Norwegian civil servant and former Governor of Svalbard.

He was born in Skjeberg Municipality. In 2005, he was appointed director of the National Criminal Investigation Service. He was the Governor of Svalbard between 2001 and 2005. He was succeeded by Sven Ole Fagernæs, and was preceded by Morten Ruud. Before this he was chief of police in Sør-Varanger Municipality and Fredrikstad Municipality. He has also been a deputy judge.

He became governor for a second term on 16 September 2009, succeeding Per Sefland, who held the post from 2005 to 2009.

Civic offices
Preceded by Morten Ruud	Governor of Svalbard; 2001–2005	Succeeded by Sven Ole Fagernæs (acting)
Preceded by Per Sefland	Governor of Svalbard; 2009–2015	Succeeded by Kjerstin Askholt
Police appointments
Preceded by Arne Huuse	Director of the National Criminal Investigation Service; 2005–2009	Succeeded by Odd Reidar Humlegård
