= Francis Sejersted =

Norwegian history professor

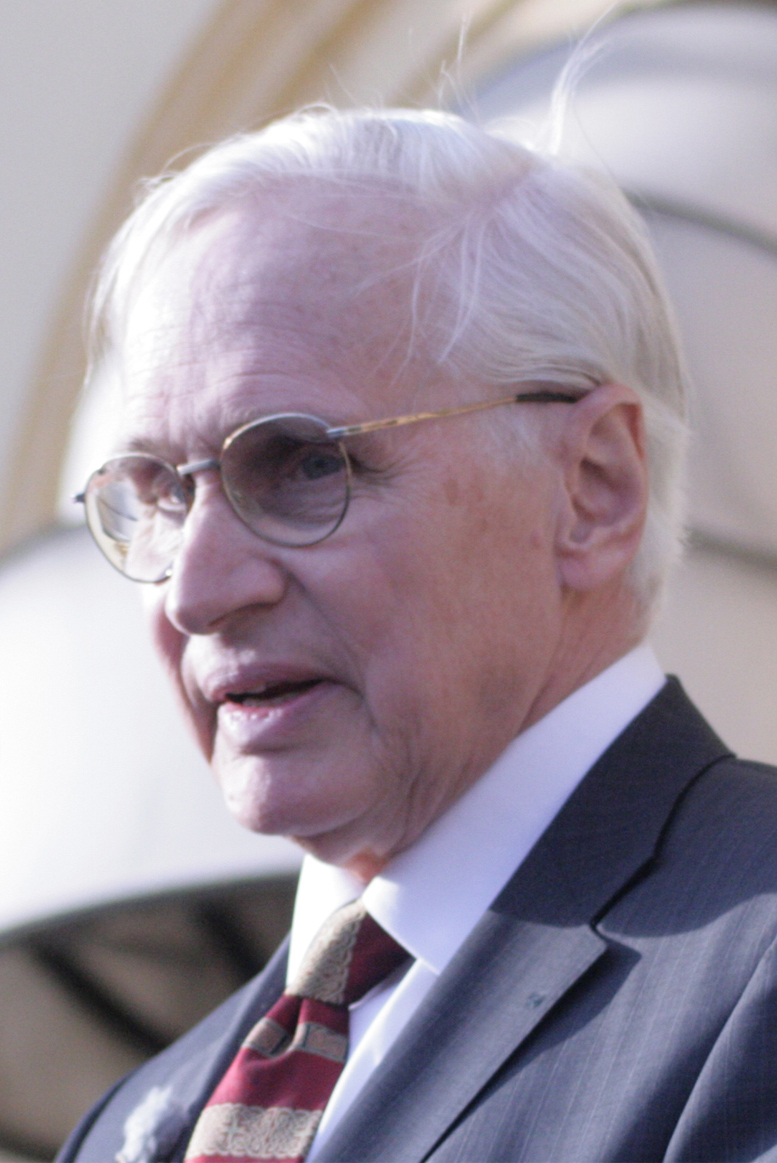
- Francis Sejersted c. 2009
- Born: 8 February 1936; Oslo, Norway
- Died: 25 August 2015 (aged 79); Oslo, Norway
- Occupation: Professor

Francis Sejersted (8 February 1936 – 25 August 2015) was a Norwegian history professor and the chairman of the Norwegian Nobel Committee (which awards the Nobel Peace Prize) from 1991 until 1995.

== Early life ==
Sejersted was born in Oslo. He performed his military service at the prestigious Russian language program of the Norwegian Armed Forces. He was later educated in history as well as Nordic linguistics and literature at the University of Oslo and achieved a cand.philol. degree in 1965 and a doctorate in 1973. In 1962 Francis Sejersted was president of the Norwegian Students' Association representing the student wing of the Conservative Party of Norway, a party with which he remained affiliated.

== Career ==
From 1971 to 1973 Sejersted served as docent in history at the University of Oslo and was thereafter professor of social and economic history at the same institution until 1998. From 1988 to 1998 he served as director of the Centre for Technology and Culture at the university and from 1999 until his death in 2015 he was a fellow of the Institute for Social Research. As a historian, Sejersted's field of expertise was the economical, technological and political history of Scandinavian countries between the Napoleonic Wars and World War II. From 1971 to 1975 he was editor of Historisk Tidsskrift ("Historical Review") and since 1984 served as co-editor of Nytt norsk tidsskrift.

Sejersted was a member of the board at the Institute for Comparative Cultural Studies 1974–1982 and at the Norwegian Research Council for Basic Research 1980-1983 as well as chairman of the Norwegian Science Policy Council 1984–1988.

Sejersted was a member of the Norwegian Nobel Committee (which awards the Nobel Peace Prize) from 1982 to 1999, and from 1991 to 1995 was its chairman. From 1990 to 1999 he also was board member of the Nobel Foundation in Stockholm. From 1996 to 1996 he chaired the governmental Freedom of Expression Commission in Norway and became chairman of The Freedom of Expression Foundation in 2000.

In 1985 he entered the Norwegian Academy of Science and Letters, in 1989 the Academia Europaea, The Royal Danish Academy of Sciences in 1993, The Norwegian Academy of Technological Sciences 1995, The Royal Swedish Academy of Sciences 1997 and finally in 2001 The Royal Norwegian Society of Sciences and Letters. He was also a member of the Norwegian Academy for Language and Literature. In 1999 he became an honorary doctor at University of Linköping, Sweden. Francis Sejersted was Commander of the Royal Norwegian Order of St. Olav, of Denmark's Order of the Dannebrog and of Sweden's Order of the Polar Star.

== Death ==
Sejersted suffered a long illness and died on 25 August 2015 in Oslo, aged 79.
