= Emilie Mehl =

Norwegian politician (born 1993)

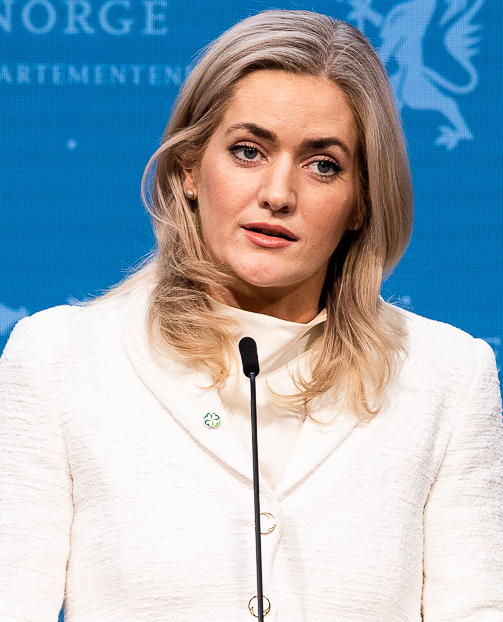
- Mehl in 2024

Minister of Justice and Public Security
- In office 14 October 2021 – 4 February 2025
- Prime Minister: Jonas Gahr Støre
- Preceded by: Monica Mæland
- Succeeded by: Astri Aas-Hansen

Member of the Storting
- In office 9 October 2017 – 30 September 2025
- Deputy: Margrethe Haarr
- Constituency: Hedmark

Personal details
- Born: Emilie Enger Mehl; 8 August 1993 (age 33) Lørenskog, Akershus, Norway
- Party: Centre
- Education: Jurisprudence
- Alma mater: University of Oslo
- Occupation: Politician

Emilie Enger Mehl (born 8 August 1993) is a Norwegian politician for the Centre Party. She served as minister of justice from 2021 to 2025 and member of parliament for Hedmark from 2017 to 2025.

== Personal life and education ==
Mehl was born in Lørenskog on 8 August 1993, a daughter of Eivind Mehl and Ellen Enger Müller. She holds a Master of laws (LL.M.) from the University of Oslo Faculty of Law.

== Career ==
=== Parliament ===
Mehl was elected representative to the Storting for the period 2017–2021 for the Centre Party. She was member of the Standing Committee on Justice from 2017 to 2020, and the Parliamentary Assembly of the Council of Europe (PACE) from 2017 to 2021.

From 2020 to 2021 she was member of the Standing Committee on Foreign Affairs and Defence and of the Enlarged Committee on Foreign Affairs and Defence. She was re-elected to the Storting for the period 2021–2025, while Margrethe Haarr deputised for her when she served in the Støre Cabinet from October 2021 to February 2025.

Following her party's withdrawal from government, Mehl joined the Standing Committee on Finance and Economic Affairs in addition to becoming the party's financial spokesperson.

She had sought re-election at the 2025 election, but ultimately lost her seat.

=== Local politics ===
She was elected representative to the county council of Hedmark from 2015.

=== Minister of Justice ===
She was appointed minister of justice on 14 October 2021. At the time of her appointment, she became the country's youngest person to serve as minister of justice.

==== 2021 ====
Mehl laid down flowers, for the victims of the Kongsberg attack. The attack happened the day before she was appointed, and she was accompanied by the prime minister.

In October 2021, she spoke about the issue of alleged abuse of power by police, during handling of drug cases.

In early November, she focused on the recent shootings in the capital: eight young men had been shot (by other civilians) over the span of ten weeks.

She rejected the Norwegian Correctional Service's proposal of reducing the amount of prisons from 32 to 13.

==== 2022 ====
In May 2022, she appeared in front of the Standing Committee on Justice to answer about the controversy regarding Hans Sverre Sjøvold, chief of Police Security Service. He resigned the following month.

There was a shortage of blank passports in May [and for some time later], and that became a bottleneck for the authorities' issuing of passports. (Mehl had already warned in March 2022, of an upcoming period where many applicants for new passports—would have to wait for unreasonably long periods of time; Thales Group were responsible for the production of the passports).

The government made a proposal to change the court system. Possible changes to the court system were being evaluated (as of May 2022). Regarding the proposed changes, she said that she wished to listen to [opinions or] voices from the districts, rather than the strong opposition from legal experts - because the experts are mostly based in the capital city.

In August 2022, Mehl recognized that Russian vessels posed a potential risk to Norwegian interests.

Later in August, it was revealed that Mehl had declined the treatment of wounded Ukrainian soldiers in Norway despite the Ministry of Foreign Affairs having approved the request. Only weeks later did she give the same response as said ministry did. At the same time, Mehl didn't disclose these details when questioned about it in the Storting. The Standing Committee on Scrutiny and Constitutional Affairs notified that they would be setting up a hearing for the case, and would be calling Mehl, prime minister Støre and foreign minister Anniken Huitfeldt in for questioning.

On 17 October, she warned people to be on high alert and report suspicious drone activity.

Later in October, Mehl ordered a fact-finding on all institutions that have handled the investigations and judicial proceedings of the Baneheia murders.

In October, Mehl also presented Beate Gangås as the new chief of the Norwegian Police Security Service.

From 31 October, she had six days to answer to parliament; some MPs have said that a recent purchase of Chinese drones from DJI, should have been stopped. Previously, in January 2022, the Conservative Party expressed concerns for national security regarding the police's process for acquiring Chinese drones from DJI. In response, Mehl called for a meeting with director of police Benedicte Bjørnland later that month.

On 2 November 2022, Mehl was forced to withdraw an inquiry that the ministry of justice had ordered from the Police Directorate; the withdrawal happened 3 hours after media told about the inquiry. The Office of the Prime Minister contacted the leadership of the Centre Party, to express concern. The inquiry had desired to decentralize the national police force; furthermore, one goal was to create 20 new police stations - each with 5 police officers - in the districts; the inquiry was supposed to "map out the possibility for making large cuts, regarding police in the big cities". On 9 November, media said that 3 of the 4 points of the inquiry, have not yet been stopped (by Mehl).

In December 2022, the opposition parties, together with the government parties, demanded that a position be created for an ombud for whistleblowing regarding police matters or perhaps even regarding matters of the justice sector. Mehl had already said in May that she would create that position, but she later shelved the idea. In May 2022, the police union in Norway had rejected the one proposed version of the idea.

On 15 December, Mehl issued an apology on behalf of the government in relation to the wrongful conviction of Viggo Kristiansen in the Baneheia murders.

==== 2023 ====
In early February 2023, Mehl admitted that she had TikTok on her work phone. Despite this, she stated that she still utilised the app. The Conservative Party had previously expressed dwindling confidence in her, which the Progress Party also later supported.

Throughout June, Mehl faced severe criticism for the intelligence handling and the findings by the investigation of the 2022 Oslo shootings.

In August, Mehl visited affected municipalities by Storm Hans in Innlandet and praised the local populations and emergency services.

In late August, Mehl and finance minister Trygve Slagsvold Vedum announced the reestablishment/establishment of ten new police stations by 2024.

In September, Mehl announced that more funding would be allocated to the police in order to combat gang violence as a response of an increase of it in neighbouring Sweden.

In December, it was revealed that the National Security Authority had taken on an illegal loan agreement worth 200 million kroner. The director, Sofie Nystrøm, announced her resignation on 8 December with immediate effect. Mehl announced in the aftermath that an investigation would be conducted and that the justice ministry would look at its routines. Additionally a grant to the NSA of an equal sum to the illegal loan would be given in order to repay it.

==== 2024 ====
In a joint press conference with labour minister Tonje Brenna on 29 January, the two announced additional measures for handling Ukrainian refugees. For her part, Mehl stated that the government would be aiming to secure the flow of refugees coming into the country and furthermore tighten up services and performance rate. Additionally she emphasised that the pressure on municipalities shouldn't become too dire that it would impact the country's ability to support Ukraine. In September 2024, Mehl declared large parts of Ukraine as "safe" in order to reject asylum seekers from these regions.

With reports of staff shortages and general underfunding of the police, Mehl announced that the government would spend 635 million NOK on strengthening the police as pet of the revised national budget. Both the Conservative and Progress parties had warned that if not sufficient funding could be provided, the latter asked that she should consider her position.

Mehl responded to criticism from the opposition in April in the wake of revelations that some cabins in Bardufoss were owned by Russians linked to the regime. Mehl denied that the government had moved slowly on the matter, and stated that they would be considering similar measures like Finland when it comes to owning properties.

Media uncovered a document on 27 April 2024 that gives an indication that Mehl has misinformed parliament for more than a year (and as late as March); The document from 2017, establishes that "double authorization" was against Norwegian laws; media showed that the authorities referred to the document in 2019, to show that double authorization was still against the law; Verdens Gang has asked Mehl if she has been misled by PST. Earlier (4 November 2022), the leader of the Standing Committee on Justice said that it is incomprehensible that Mehl is not intervening and giving orders to the justice ministry and underlying agencies, regarding answers to questions about the case involving employment termination of a whistleblower at the Norwegian Police Security Service (PST). After having whistleblowed - in regard to Benedicte Bjørnland, Roger Berg and Kaare Songstad - the whistleblower was told that he would need two authorities to give him authorization - for access to classified information: a (relevant) police chief and also the chief of PST. In a 2 November reply to Ingvild Wetrhus Thorsvik of the Standing Committee on Justice, Mehl claimed that such "double authorization" is required by law; however, on 4 November media revealed that 3 documents from the justice ministry from 2017, 2019 and 2020 say otherwise. Carl I. Hagen, a member of the Standing Committee on Scrutiny and Constitutional Affairs sent questions to Mehl, asking her how many PST servicemen already have been subjected to "double authorization". As of 5 November 2022, Thorsvik has sent additional questions to Mehl.

Mehl caused some controversy in October when she describes Innlandet county mayor Thomas Breen to be "prostituting himself to the Conservative Party" over the county's decision to close down several upper secondary schools. Both Breen and his deputy retorted that Mehl should focus on her duties as justice minister. Mehl countered with arguing that she had the right to care about the closure of schools because she is an elected member of parliament and representative of her local county chapter in Hedmark. She further encouraged Breen and his deputy to reverse their decision to close down the schools. Prime Minister Jonas Gahr Støre later criticsed her comment, calling it "unacceptable". He did however share general criticism against Breen, emphasising that "schools are more than just buildings" and cited the importance of securing good schools and learning.

==== 2025 ====
Following TV2's documentary on assisted suicide in January, both Mehl and the Progress Party condemned the findings. As assisted suicide is illegal per Norwegian law, Mehl vowed that the police ought to crack down on the networks who offer the services. The Progress Party for their part, encouraged other parties to also address the issue.

Following the Centre Party's withdrawal from government, she was succeeded by Astri Aas-Hansen on 4 February 2025.

== Other ==
Mehl is previously known as the winner of the first season (2015) of the Norwegian reality show Anno.

She also participated in the third season of Kompani Lauritzen, but did not accept payment for her participation, but instead wished for her remuneration to be donated to charity organisations. She went on to win the season.
