= Jørn Holme =

Norwegian judge and civil servant (born 1959)

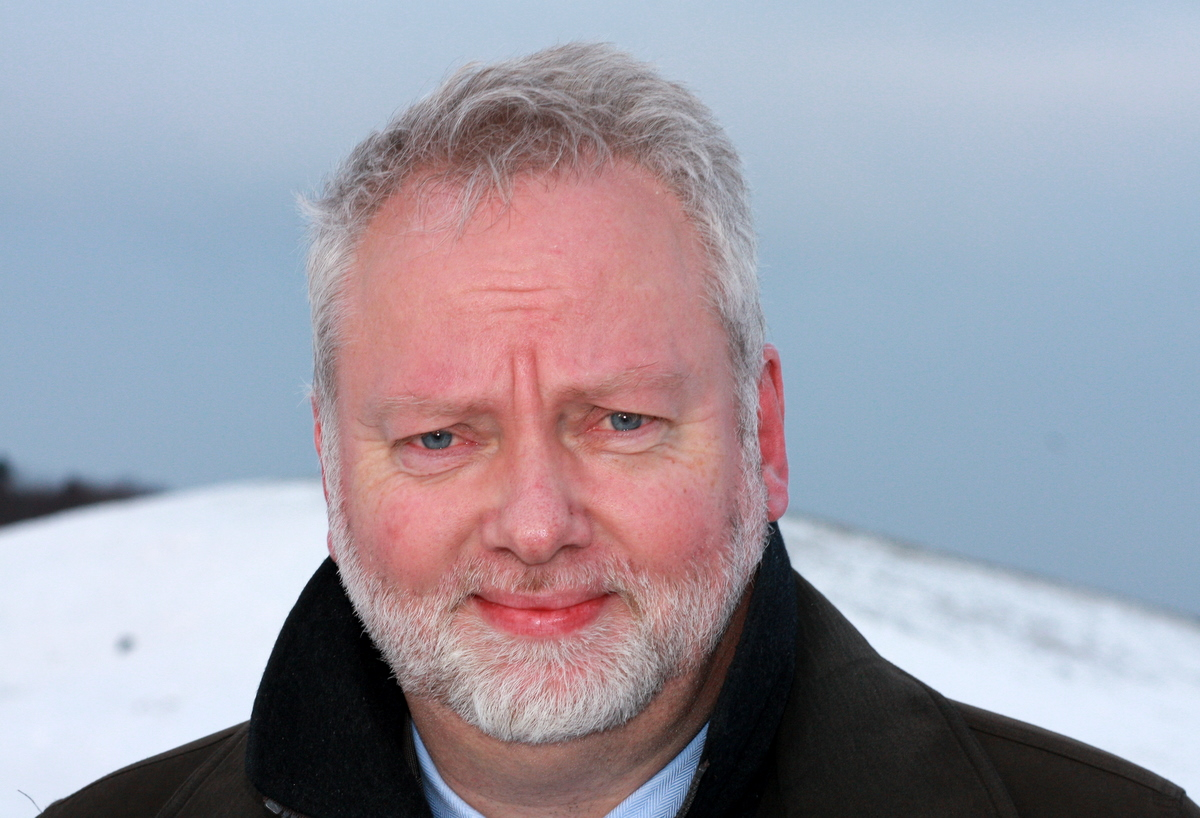
Jørn Holme, November 2010.

Jørn Holme (born 16 August 1959) is a Norwegian judge and civil servant.

He grew up at Nordberg, and originally wanted to become a priest. He was active in the Norwegian Christian Student Association while studying. He graduated with the cand.jur. degree from the University of Oslo in 1986. He left a job as research assistant there to do his compulsory military service, then work in the police. In 1988 he was hired as a police inspector for Senja, and from 1990 to 1991 he was an acting judge at Trondenes and Oslo District Courts. From 1991 to 2001 he was a public prosecutor in the Norwegian National Authority for the Investigation and Prosecution of Economic and Environmental Crime (Økokrim). His work mainly concerned environmental crime. He edited and wrote books during this period, and launched the periodical Miljøkrim. He had short interruptions from this position to be acting presiding judge in Eidsivating in 1993, acting assisting director in the Norwegian Directorate for Cultural Heritage in 1997 and acting general prosecutor in the Norwegian Army in 2001.

In 2001, when Bondevik's Second Cabinet assumed office, Holme was appointed State Secretary in the Ministry of Justice and the Police. He represented the Liberal Party of Norway. He was recruited by Odd Einar Dørum without any partisan political background. He left politics in 2004 to become the new head of the Norwegian Police Security Service. He succeeded the acting police security director Arnstein Øverkil, who had held office temporarily since Per Sefland resigned the previous year. Holme was the first active politician to be appointed as police security director. The task of the Police Security Service is to conduct domestic intelligence gathering, whereas foreign operations are reserved for the Norwegian Intelligence Service. An amount of coordination between these two bodies as well as the National Security Authority is also involved.

In 2006 became a board member of the Society for the Preservation of Ancient Norwegian Monuments. In June 2009 Holme was announced as the new director of the Norwegian Directorate for Cultural Heritage. The previous director Nils Marstein had been appointed while Holme was acting assisting director in 1997, but now withdrew after two six-year terms. It became clear that Holme could not leave the Police Security Service before 22 October; after Nils Marstein left in August Sjur Helseth became acting director. In the Police Security Service, Roger Berg was acting director from 23 October to 10 November, when Janne Kristiansen took over.

Holme is married and has three children. They reside in Frogner, Oslo. He has cited his "ideal" as being Johs. Andenæs.

Police appointments
Preceded by Arnstein Øverkil (acting)	Director of the Norwegian Police Security Service; 2004–2009	Succeeded by Janne Kristiansen
Civic offices
Preceded by Sjur Helseth (acting)	Director of the Norwegian Directorate for Cultural Heritage; 2009–2018	Incumbent
