= Norwegian Defence Security Department =

- Insignia of NORDSD
- Active: from 1940
- Country: Norway
- Branch: Joint
- Type: Security Service
- Role: Security and counter-intelligence
- Size: approx 100 persons
- Garrison/HQ: Oslo

Commanders
- Current commander: Captain (naval); Hans Kristian Herland
- Commander-in-Chief: HM The King

The Norwegian Defence Security Department (NORDSD) (in Norwegian: Forsvarets sikkerhetsavdeling, acronym: FSA) is a joint security and counter-intelligence military intelligence service within the Norwegian Armed Forces. Its members are a mix of civilian employees and military personnel. The head of the service holds the military rank Colonel or (naval) captain.

== Role and responsibility ==
NORDSD's primary responsibility is protective security and operative security services within the Armed Forces, including responsibilities related to the Norwegian Armed Forces security intelligence. NORDSD shall, on behalf of the Chief of Defence, Norwegian Armed Forces (CHODNOR):

- Counteract security threats, and threats associated with espionage, sabotage and terrorist acts that may affect military activities and/or national security.
- Conduct background checks, (the vetting process) to determine if security clearance can be given to military personnel who apply for access to classified information.
- Act as the Designated Security Authority in Norway for the "request for visit" system, by controlling both visits of foreign nationals to the Norwegian Armed Forces or Norwegian defence industry, and issue Norwegian citizens with a certificate of security clearance when visiting other nations where valid security clearance is required.
- Liaise with the Norwegian Police Security Service in cases that involve the Armed Forces.

NORDSD does this by collecting and assessing information regarding security risks and weaknesses within the Norwegian Armed Forces, to analyze and recommend which counter-measures must be taken.

NORDSD is the largest security clearance (vetting) authority in Norway and handles approximately 20,000 security clearance cases annually.

== Rule of law and legal mandate ==
Within any democratic and transparent nation, the rule of law and Rechtsstaat principle of regulating executive powers is fundamental. The Norwegian Constitution, Article 99, forbids the use of military personnel and powers against the citizens unless warranted by act of parliament or insurrection. Article 110c forbids any executive action that is a violation of human rights.

Only the Norwegian Police Security Service (PST), the Norwegian Intelligence Service (ETJ) and the Norwegian National Security Authority (NSM) are defined as "secret services" and given special executive authority by separate acts of parliament.

Since no special executive authority is given, the rule of law principle strongly limits NORDSD to only operate within the Armed Forces. Therefore, all actions or counter-measures must have a legal basis in:

1. The general provisions of the Protective Security Act, The Defence Secrets Act, The Military Criminal Justice Act and the Military Police powers act.
2. Common law / Chain of command authority within the Norwegian Armed Forces
3. International treaties/agreements concerning military security regulation through Norway's membership of NATO.

== Oversight ==
As a result of lessons learned by the surveillance scandals after the end of the Cold War, several fail-safe mechanisms are in place to prevent future breaches of human rights and illegal surveillance. NORDSD is under the direct oversight of the legislative and executive branches in Norway.

The legislative branch exercises its control through the Norwegian Parliamentary Intelligence Oversight Committee, (EOS-committee), which is an independent watch-dog that has monitored NORDSD activities since 2003. The service was elevated to be one of the 'main inspection objects' (the Norwegian secret services are the others), in 2009. In all of the EOS committee's annual reports to the Stortinget (the Norwegian Parliament), all deviation from what the committee deems to be good standards has, with the rule of law or human rights, been exposed and correctly criticized. These reports are available to the public on the EOS-committee website.

The executive branch exercises its control through different means:

- By controlling measures pursuant to the Protective Security Act in the Armed Forces, also in matters of personnel security to ensure uniform interpretation of the Act. NORDSD is under the supervisory authority of the Norwegian National Security Authority.
- Political control which is exercised through civilian control of the military through the Minister of Defence, and the principle of accountability in the Parliamentary system.
- The chain of command which is exercised through the CHODNOR, his Chief-of-staff and the CHODNOR auditory unit, and is responsible to regularly brief the Minister of Defence on NORDSD activities.
- The judicial branch exercises indirect control of NORDSD in these cases' legal actions brought against persons by the service or if a corporate charge is brought against NORDSD or its personnel.

== Insignia ==
The shoulder patch worn by NORDSD military personnel on no. 2 service uniforms

NORDSD insignia is constructed in accordance with Norwegian and continental heraldic rules and tradition; it was approved by the Chief of Defence, Norwegian Armed Forces (CHODNOR) in 2003. The insignia symbolism is as follows:

1. The crown is, in Norway, the symbol of the sovereign and the executive powers of the state.
2. The basis livery colour is green. This stems from World War II when the exiled Norwegian Armed Forces in the United Kingdom adopted the British Army's patterns to indicate rank and service branch. Green was the service branch colour for the intelligence and security service (this is seen today in the UK's army Intelligence Corps beret and stable belt colour which is cypress green).
3. The silver key represents access to knowledge that is the sovereign property and must be protected.
4. The lion figure is based on the Coat of arms of Norway. It represents strength and determination to protect and guard the nation and its firm hold on the key, affirms the loyalty to protect the sovereign property.

Since NORDSD is not a part of the Norwegian Army lifeguard division ((this role is filled by His Majesty the King's Guards (HMKG) and the Military Academy (KS) - Linderud)), the standard gold colour is used.
