= Mæland =

Mæland is a Norwegian surname. Notable people with the surname include:

- Eirik Mæland (born 1989), Norwegian footballer
- Monica Mæland (born 1968), Norwegian politician
- Øystein Mæland (born 1960), Norwegian psychiatrist, civil servant and politician
