= Nils Marstein =

Norwegian civil servant (born 1950)

Nils Marstein (born 4 February 1950) is a Norwegian civil servant.

He was educated as an architect at the Norwegian Institute of Technology from 1969 to 1974, and was hired at the Norwegian Directorate for Cultural Heritage in 1979. In 1991 he was promoted to head of the technical department. In 1995 he was promoted to acting director of the organization, meant to replace Øivind Lunde in the last two years of Lunde's designated six-year term. Marstein was the first architect in 82 years to head the Norwegian Directorate for Cultural Heritage.

While his two-year term as acting director was nearing its end, Marstein applied for the position on a permanent basis. The other candidate was Fatma Bhanji Jynge. On 1 August 1997 it was announced that Marstein was appointed. In 2003 it was decided to give him another six-year term, but he had to step aside in August 2009. Sjur Helseth became acting director while Jørn Holme would succeed him in October 2009.

Marstein has been a member of the International Council on Monuments and Sites, the International Centre for the Study of the Preservation and Restoration of Cultural Property and the UNESCO World Heritage Committee. He is a fellow of the Norwegian Academy of Technological Sciences.

Civic offices
Preceded by Øivind Lunde	Director of the Norwegian Directorate for Cultural Heritage; 1995–2009 (acting director 1995–1997)	Succeeded by Jørn Holme
