= Einar Høgetveit =

Norwegian prosecutor and judge (1949–2020)

Einar Høgetveit (28 October 1949 – 10 August 2020) was a Norwegian prosecutor and judge.

== Biography ==
He was born in Hamar and graduated with the cand.jur. degree at the University of Oslo. His period as a deputy judge was spent in Lier, Røyken and Hurum District Court.

He worked in the Ministry of Justice and the Police from 1986 to 1991, then as a public prosecutor in the Norwegian National Authority for the Investigation and Prosecution of Economic and Environmental Crime ("Ecocrime") from 1991 to 1996. From 1991 to 2000, Høgetveit served as Økokrim's first public prosecutor. From 1996 to 1998, he was on leave to serve as the head of the Criminal Law Commission. In 1998 he became deputy director, and in 2000 he became director. From 2009 to his retirement he was a presiding judge in Borgarting Court of Appeal. He died at age 70.

Police appointments
Preceded by Anstein Gjengedal	Director of the Norwegian National Authority for the Investigation and Prosecution of Economic and Environmental Crime; 2000–2009	Succeeded by Trond Erik Schea
