= Jostein Erstad =

Norwegian jurist (1922–2011)

Jostein Einar Erstad (27 May 1922 – 2 July 2011) was a Norwegian jurist.

He was born in Skodje Municipality. He was a police superintendent in Oslo from 1962 to 1966, teacher at the Norwegian Police Academy from 1966 to 1971, public prosecutor in Eidsivating Court of Appeal from 1971 to 1981, chief public prosecutor from 1981 to 1982 and director of the Norwegian Police Surveillance Agency from 1982 to 1990. The Arne Treholt case happened during his directorship.

He died in July 2011.

Police appointments
Preceded by Gunnar Haarstad	Director of the Norwegian Police Surveillance Agency; 1982–1990	Succeeded by Svein Urdal
