= Hans Sverre Sjøvold =

Norwegian jurist

Director of the Norwegian Police Security Service
- In office 1 June 2019 – 2 June 2022
- Prime Minister: Erna Solberg; Jonas Gahr Støre
- Deputy: Hedvig Moe
- Preceded by: Marie Benedicte Bjørnland
- Succeeded by: Beate Gangås

Chief of Police of Oslo
- In office 2012 – 1 June 2019
- Preceded by: Anstein Gjengedal
- Succeeded by: Beate Gangås

Personal details
- Born: 20 August 1957 (age 69) Færder, Vestfold, Norway
- Occupation: Jurist; Civil servant

Hans Sverre Sjøvold (born 20 August 1957) is a Norwegian civil servant and former police chief. He served as the director of the Norwegian Police Security Service from 2019 until his resignation in 2022 following an illegal weapons storage scandal. He had previously served as the Oslo Chief of Police from 2012 to 2019.

== Personal life ==
Sjøvold was born in what is now Færder Municipality on 20 August 1957. He is married to Kristin Monstad.

== Career ==
Sjøvold graduated with the cand.jur. degree in 1988 and embarked on a career in the prosecution authority. From 2001 to 2002 he served as assisting director of the National Police Directorate before serving as Chief of Police in Vestfold from 2002 to 2005. He was then rector of the Norwegian Police University College from 2005 to 2010, and deputy under-secretary of state in the Ministry of Justice and the Police from 2010. He was appointed chief of police of Oslo in 2012, succeeding Anstein Gjengedal.

He was appointed head of the Norwegian Police Security Service (PST), effective from June 2019. He held this position from 2019 to 2022.

== Controversy ==
Later in 2019, media revealed that Sjøvold had been storing three firearms illegally for several years. It was also revealed that had also stored a few in the Ministry of Justice. In May 2022, MPs sent written questions about the case, to justice minister Emilie Enger Mehl. On 25 May, she appeared in front of the Standing Committee on Justice to answer about the controversy.

Sjøvold made a written explanation to the then Minister of Justice Jøran Kallmyr in 2019. His explanation was later released to the public on the day he resigned. Later in May, Terje Nybøe, the chief of the Norwegian Bureau for the Investigation of Police Affairs, said that the agency could have investigated further when Sjøvold was suspected of having abused his position. Later in May, the Standing Committee on Scrutiny and Constitutional Affairs wrote a letter to justice minister Emilie Enger Mehl, asking for insight of the content of Sjøvold's letter to her predecessor back in 2019.

In late May, a whistleblower within the Norwegian Police Service revealed to Verdens Gang that one police employee became disabled after experiencing threats and coercion from colleagues and leaders regarding [a desire that the] employee should formally accept weapons (on behalf of the police), from Sjøvold.

On 2 June 2022, Sjøvold resigned as chief of Norwegian Police Security Service, which came in the wake of revelations regarding the three firearms that he wanted to get rid of, and which he had stored unlawfully.

Police appointments
| Preceded by Anstein Gjengedal | Chief of Police of Oslo; 2012–2019 | Succeeded by Beate Gangås |
| Preceded by Roger Berg (acting) | Director of the Norwegian Police Security Service; 2019–2022 | Succeeded by Beate Gangås |
