= Hans Olav Østgaard =

Norwegian jurist

Hans Olav Østgaard (born 13 October 1944) is a Norwegian jurist.

He was born in Oslo, and graduated with the cand.jur. degree in 1969. He was hired in the Norwegian Ministry of Justice and the Police in 1970, and was promoted to deputy under-secretary of state in 1982. In 1993 he was appointed director of the Norwegian Police Surveillance Agency. He was pressured to resign in 1996, as the Norwegian Parliamentary Intelligence Oversight Committee found it unacceptable that Berge Furre had been surveilled while sitting on the Lund Commission. Østgaard instead became assistant to the permanent under-secretary of state in the Ministry of Justice and the Police in 1997.

Police appointments
| Preceded by Jan Grøndahl (acting) | Director of the Norwegian Police Surveillance Agency; 1993–1996 | Succeeded by Ellen Holager Andenæs (acting) |
