= Tagge =

Tagge is a surname. Notable people with the surname include:

- Jerry Tagge (born 1950), American football player
- Jørn Ronnie Tagge (born 1969), Norwegian businessman and fraudster

== See also ==
- Tagge Webster (1910–1986), English cricketer
- General Cassio Tagge, fictional character in the Star Wars universe
