= Bryhn =

Bryhn is a surname. Notable people with the surname include:

- Asbjørn Bryhn (1906–1990), Norwegian police officer, resistance member, and head of intelligence
- Håkon Bryhn (1901–1968), Norwegian sailor
- Ole-Kristian Bryhn (born 1989), Norwegian sport shooter
