= Urdal =

Urdal is a surname. Notable people with the surname include:

- Finn Urdal (born 1944), Norwegian handball player
- Henrik Urdal (born 1972), Norwegian political scientist
- Svein Urdal (born 1941), Norwegian jurist

== See also ==
- Urdahl
