= Janne Kristiansen =

Norwegian jurist (born 1952)

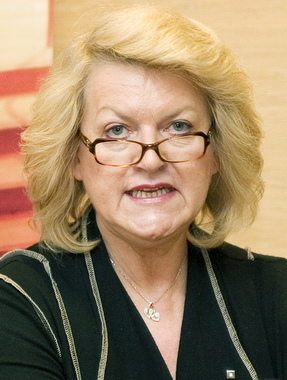

1st Head of the Norwegian Criminal Cases Review Commission
- In office 16 April 2004 – 18 September 2009
- Monarch: Harald V
- Succeeded by: Helen Sæter

Head of the Norwegian Police Security Service
- In office 25 September 2009 – 18 January 2012
- Monarch: Harald V
- Prime Minister: Jens Stoltenberg
- Preceded by: Roger Berg (Acting)
- Succeeded by: Marie Benedicte Bjørnland

Personal details
- Born: 21 November 1952 (age 73) Oslo, Norway
- Occupation: Jurist

Janne Kristiansen (born 21 November 1952) is a Norwegian jurist. She was the first head of the Criminal Cases Review Commission from 2004 to 2009. and head of the Norwegian Police Security Service (PST) from 2009 to 2012, a position from which she resigned following a heavily politicized scandal.

== Career ==
Born in Oslo, Janne Kristiansen graduated cand. jur. from the University of Oslo in 1979 and worked for a number of years as a high-profiled defence attorney. She was the head of Forsvarergruppen av 1977 (a group of defence lawyers working to promote the principles of the Rechtsstaat and rule of law) between 1985 and 1990. Kristiansen worked as a public defender in Borgarting Court of Appeal from 1986 and in Moss District Court from 1990.

Janne Kristiansen has participated in the making of several Norwegian Official Reports, such as NOU 2003.18 on national security and NOU 2003.21 on "Crime fighting and privacy - the police and public prosecutors' processing of information".

As head of the Criminal Cases Review Commission between 2004 and 2009 she oversaw the decisions on the applications to appeal the criminal trials of Fredrik Fasting Torgersen and Arne Treholt.

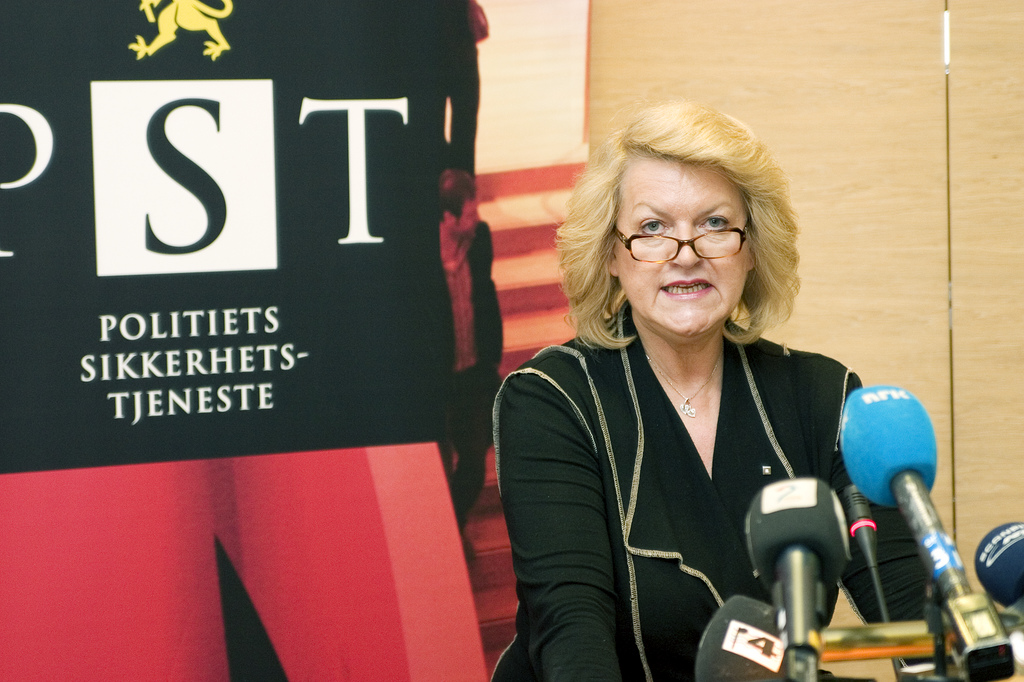
Janne Kristiansen presenting the PST's annual threat assessment for Norwegian society for 2010

She was appointed to the position as director of the Norwegian Police Security Service on 25 September 2009. There were three other applicants, and Minister of Justice Knut Storberget had specifically asked her to apply. Her accession was in November. As head of the PST Kristiansen was juxtaposed with the director of the National Police Directorate as one of the two top leaders of the Norwegian Police Service. During her time as head of the PST she oversaw the arrests of three men with residencies in Norway suspected of planning a terror attack on the Danish newspaper Jyllands-Posten. In addition the terror attacks on the government quarters and Utøya on 22 July 2011 happened during her PST leadership.

She resigned as director on 18 January 2012, after accidentally revealing that Norway had intelligence assets in Pakistan, with her deputy Roger Berg succeeding her as acting leader.

== Forced resignation as head of PST ==
Janne Kristiansen resigned as PST leader on 18 January 2012 following an open hearing of the parliament's 22 July Committee (not to be confused with the 22 July Commission) that same day where she had been summoned to answer questions about Norwegian security and intelligence work. This unfolded after she had answered a direct question from Member of Parliament Akhtar Chaudhry (Socialist Left Party) during the parliament's (Storting) questioning of her. The question was whether Norway has cooperation with Pakistan in the intelligence arena, and Kristiansen's reply was interpreted as a confirmation that the Norwegian Intelligence Service (military intelligence) had in fact a presence in that country. Both the two major news agencies in Norway, however, have written that representatives from the Norwegian Armed Forces have confirmed the presence of the Intelligence Service abroad on a number of previous occasions. This would make it uncertain whether confidential information was revealed during the hearing. In March 2012 police investigations of Kristiansen were dropped by the Bureau for the Investigation of Police Affairs.

Police appointments
Preceded by position created	Leader of the Norwegian Criminal Cases Review Commission; 2004–2009	Succeeded by Helen Sæter (acting)
Preceded by Jørn Holme	Director of the Norwegian Police Security Service; 2009–2012	Succeeded by Roger Berg (acting)
