= Kripos =

Norwegian Police Service special agency

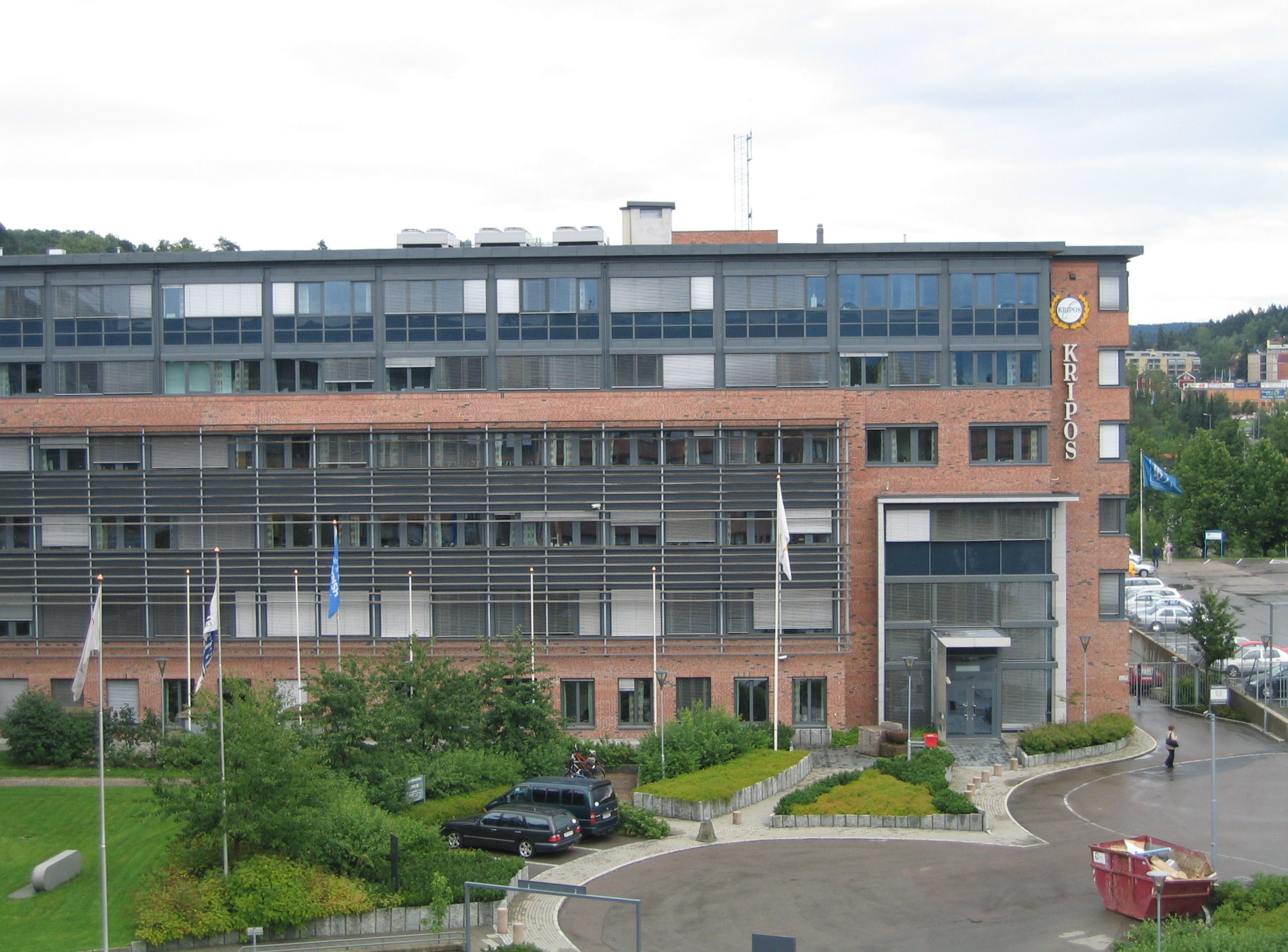
Kripos headquarters at Bryn in Oslo

The National Criminal Investigation Service (Norwegian: Den nasjonale enhet for bekjempelse av organisert og annen alvorlig kriminalitet, previously Kriminalpolitisentralen), commonly known as Kripos, is a special agency of the Norwegian Police Service. Based at Bryn in Oslo and established in 1959, it is a national unit that works with organized and serious crime. It both works as an assisting unit for police districts, with special focus on technical and tactical investigation, and is responsible on its own for organized crime. It acts as the center for international police cooperation, including participation in Interpol and Europol. It is subordinate to the National Police Directorate. Kripos represents four percent of the Norwegian police force, with nearly 500 employees.

== History ==
On 1 January 2005, the organization was renamed Nye Kripos, with the undertittel ["under title"] and formal name Den nasjonale enhet for bekjempelse av organisert og annen alvorlig kriminalitet (DNEFBAOAAK). Then minister of justice said that the common usage of [the name] New Scotland Yard, makes it natural to change the name Kripos—to Nye Kripos; thereby the renaming of the building matched that of the police force. In 2006, Nye Kripos was changed back to Kripos.

== Directors ==
- 1959–1976: Arne Kleveland
- 1976–1993: Bjørn Heggelund
- 1993–2005: Arne Huuse
- 2005–2009: Odd Olsen Ingerø
- 2009–2012: Odd Reidar Humlegård
- 2012–2020: Ketil Haukaas (acting director from 2012, permanent director from June 2013)
- 2020–present: Kristin Ottesen Kvigne
