= Aspmyra Stadion =

Norwegian municipal football stadium

- Hell of Ice
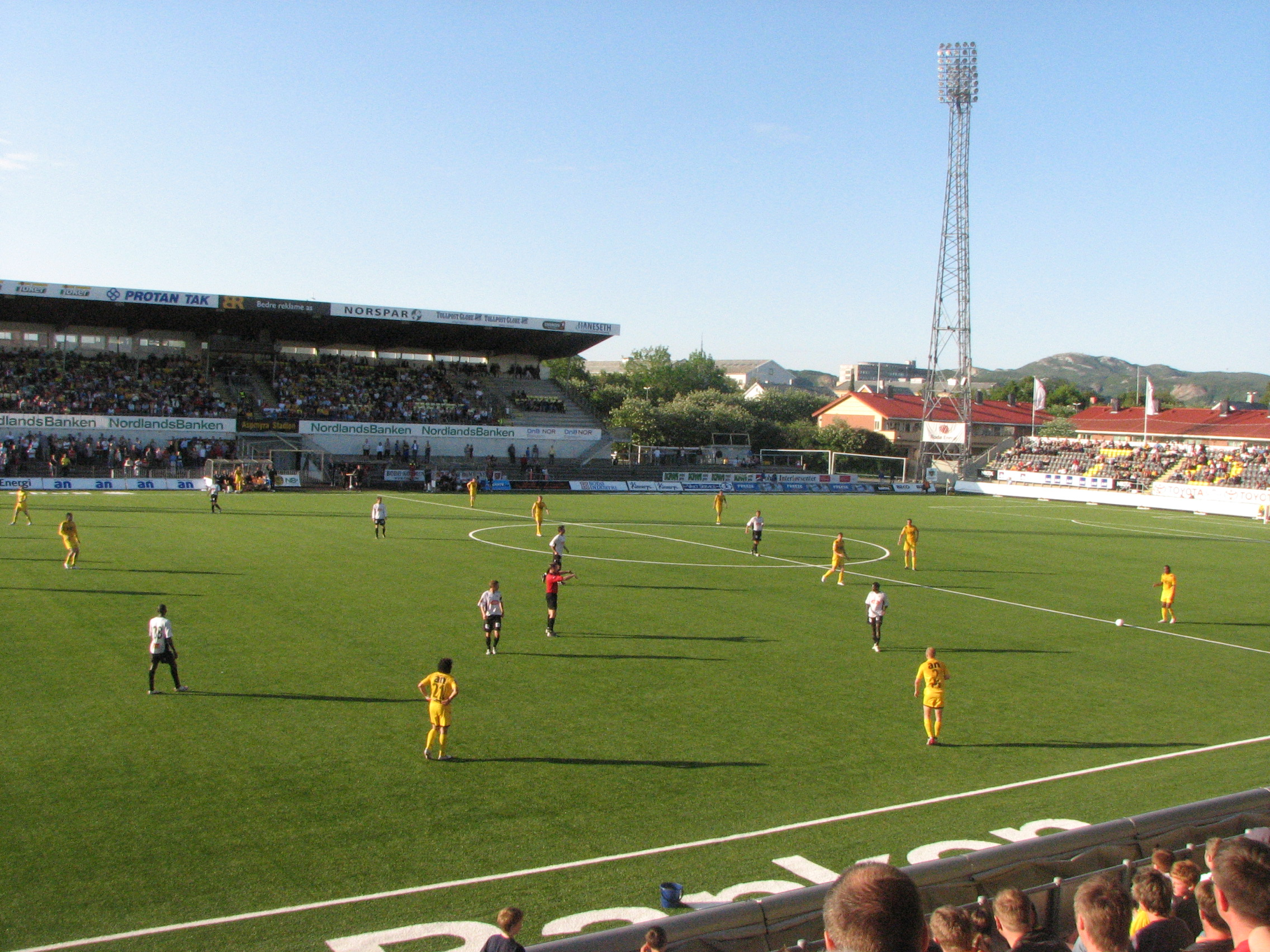
- Interactive map of Aspmyra Stadion
- Location: Bodø, Norway
- Coordinates: 67°16′36″N 14°23′4″E
- Owner: Bodø Municipality
- Operator: Bodø/Glimt
- Capacity: 8,270
- Executive suites: 15
- Surface: Artificial turf
- Scoreboard: LED video display
- Record attendance: 12,189
- Field size: 105 x 68 m

Construction
- Groundbreaking: 1964
- Opened: 1966
- Renovated: 1980, 2008
- Expanded: 1999–2001
- Cost: NOK 140 million (1999–2001) (estimated)

Tenants
- Bodø/Glimt; Grand Bodø

Aspmyra Stadion is a football stadium in the town of Bodø, Norway. Home of Bodø/Glimt and Grand Bodø, it holds a seated capacity for 8,270 spectators. The venue has four stands: a modern all-seater with roof, 100 club seats and 15 luxury boxes to the south, unroofed all-seater stands to the east and west and two stands to the north. An older raised grandstand with roofing at the back and a new (built 2022) all-seater unroofed stand in front. Before this new stand was built the area in front of the old stand was a standing area that could hold approximately 2000 people, but did not fulfill UEFA safety regulations for international matches. The venue has floodlights and artificial turf with under-soil heating. Immediately south of the venue lies Aspmyra kunstgressbane, a training pitch with artificial turf. Aspmyra Stadion has hosted one Norway national football team match, against Iceland in 2002.

The venue opened in 1966 as a municipal multi-purpose stadium which included a running track. Glimt reached the top-flight in 1977, and played Cup Winners' Cup matches in the late 1970s at Aspmyra. The venue had a slight upgrade in 1980, which also saw the laying of all-weather running track and the construction of the training pitch. In 1992, the pitch was resowed, forcing Glimt to play a season in Nordlandshallen, which since has been used twice for Norwegian top division matches. Aspmyra Stadion was sold to Glimt in 1997, followed by the construction of the south and east stands. This involved removing the running track and building commercial and residential properties around the venue. Artificial turf was laid in 2006. After the club received illegal public subsidies in 2008 and had to upgrade the venue, it was in 2011 sold back to the municipality.

== History ==
After the establishment of Bodø/Glimt in 1916 and Grand Bodø the following year, the clubs played at various locations throughout the town. The primary venue for the clubs' elite teams was Bodø Station. By 1962, plans had surfaced for a central stadium for the prime sports clubs. The interest spurred a large protest meeting organized by the various sports clubs in town in support of the municipality building a new venue. Two locations were considered: at Plassmyra, now the location of the Norwegian Aviation Museum, and at Aspmyra. The latter was chosen and the plans were passed by the municipal council in 1963.

Construction started in 1965, with the completion of a grass pitch, a 400-meter (1,300 ft) running track and a grandstand consisting of wooden benches for 2,500 spectators. Steel terraces were built on the outer parts of the grandstand site and the other long side. To the south of the stadium, Glimt built an air-supported training hall, which they named Glimtbobla ('The Glimt Bubble'). The inaugural match at Aspmyra was played in 1966 between the boys' teams of Glimt and Grand in 1966. In 1980, an all-weather running track was installed and a training pitch with artificial turf, named Aspmyra kunstgressbane, was built south of the stadium.

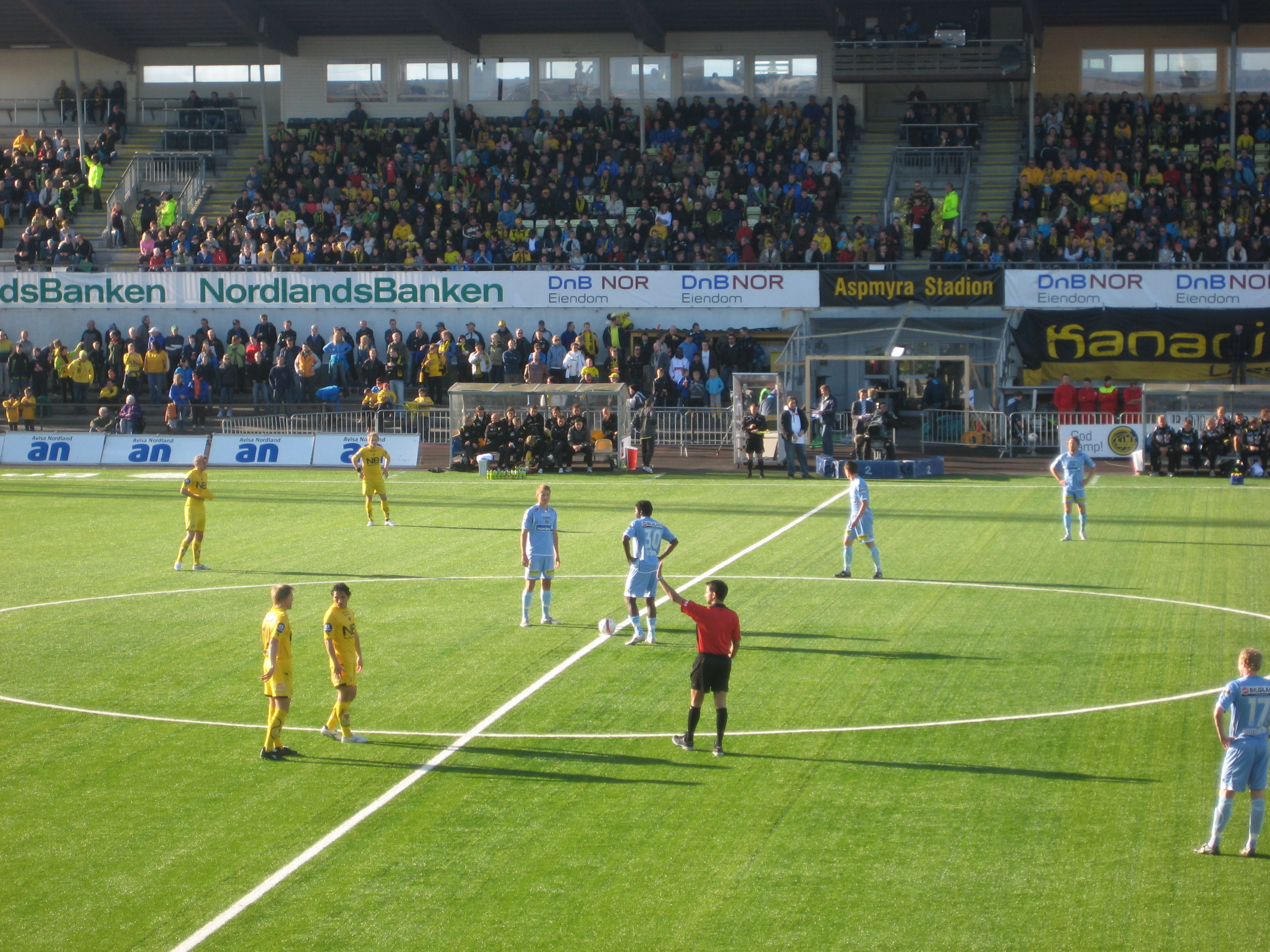
Kick-off during a 2008 Tippeligaen match between Bodø/Glimt and Lillestrøm. Behind is the old North Stand, and between the stand and the pitch the remains of the all-weather running track

In 1989, a project was started to bring Bodø/Glimt back to the top league. Among the most important issues was to secure better training facilities, particularly during the Arctic winter. The club proposed upgrading the artificial turf field at Aspmyra with a new field with under-soil heating, in addition to constructing both a new gravel pitch and an indoor training hall with a full-size pitch. The Municipal Committee for Sport and Culture stated that they wanted to prioritize the artificial turf field over a gravel pitch. They therefore proposed that NOK 3.5 million be allocated to lay under-soil heating on the artificial turf pitch and remove the turf. New artificial turf would be laid at a later date, when funding could be allocated. This was agreed upon, construction started on 24 October 1989 and was scheduled for completion ahead of the winter training. However, the Football Association of Norway (NFF) stated that the club would not be allowed to play their matches on a gravel pitch, and the grass at Aspmyra was in so bad condition that it would not be permitted for play in the top league, should the team be promoted. The municipal council therefore gave grants to finance a new artificial turf on the training pitch, which was taken into use in 1990.

Construction of Nordlandshallen—an indoor football venue for winter training—started in 1990 and was completed on 21 September 1991. In 1991, the debate regarding laying a new pitch at the stadium resurfaced. NFF granted permission for Glimt to use Nordlandshallen for the 1992 season, on condition that Aspmyra was ready for use for the 1993 season. The municipality lacked funds for a new pitch, so the parties agreed that the club would borrow NOK 3.5 million to pay for the renovation. The club would pay the interest on the loan until it was taken over by the municipality, but until then, Bodø/Glimt would not pay rent on the stadium. If the municipality was to finance the renovation in a regular manner, funds could not be allocated until the following year, which would cause two seasons to be lost. The new pitch included under-soil heating.

In 1994, Bodø/Glimt started making plans to expand Aspmyra to allow it to host UEFA matches. The company Aspmyra Eiendomsutvikling was established to finance the project and own the stands. Details were presented in 1996, which consisted of the company being given the Aspmyra lot, worth NOK 15 million, from the municipality. The initial plans called for seated stands for 10,000 spectators—a quarter of the town's population—48 apartments and 15,000 square meters (160,000 sq ft) of commercial property. Funding was proposed to come from selling the residential and commercial properties and grants from NFF and the Ministry of Culture. The project also included new floodlights and a new club house. The municipal chief of administration, Svein Blix, stated that the project would also have to pay for the operation of the new venue and the construction of a new athletics venue, as the plans called to remove the running tracks at Aspmyra.

The municipality gave the necessary permissions for construction in December 1997, but required that the club finance the upgrades, which the club could not afford. Kjell Ove Johansen, CEO of Bodø/Glimt's operating company, quit his job in November 1998 in protest against the mayor's and councilors' negative attitude and lack of trust towards Bodø/Glimt regarding the venue plans. On 27 January 1999, the municipal council passed a resolution allowing the venue to be sold to the club for NOK 7.9 million, with the official take-over date being 1 May. In addition, the company would pay NOK 5.5 million to the municipality at a later date, after the venue had become profitable.

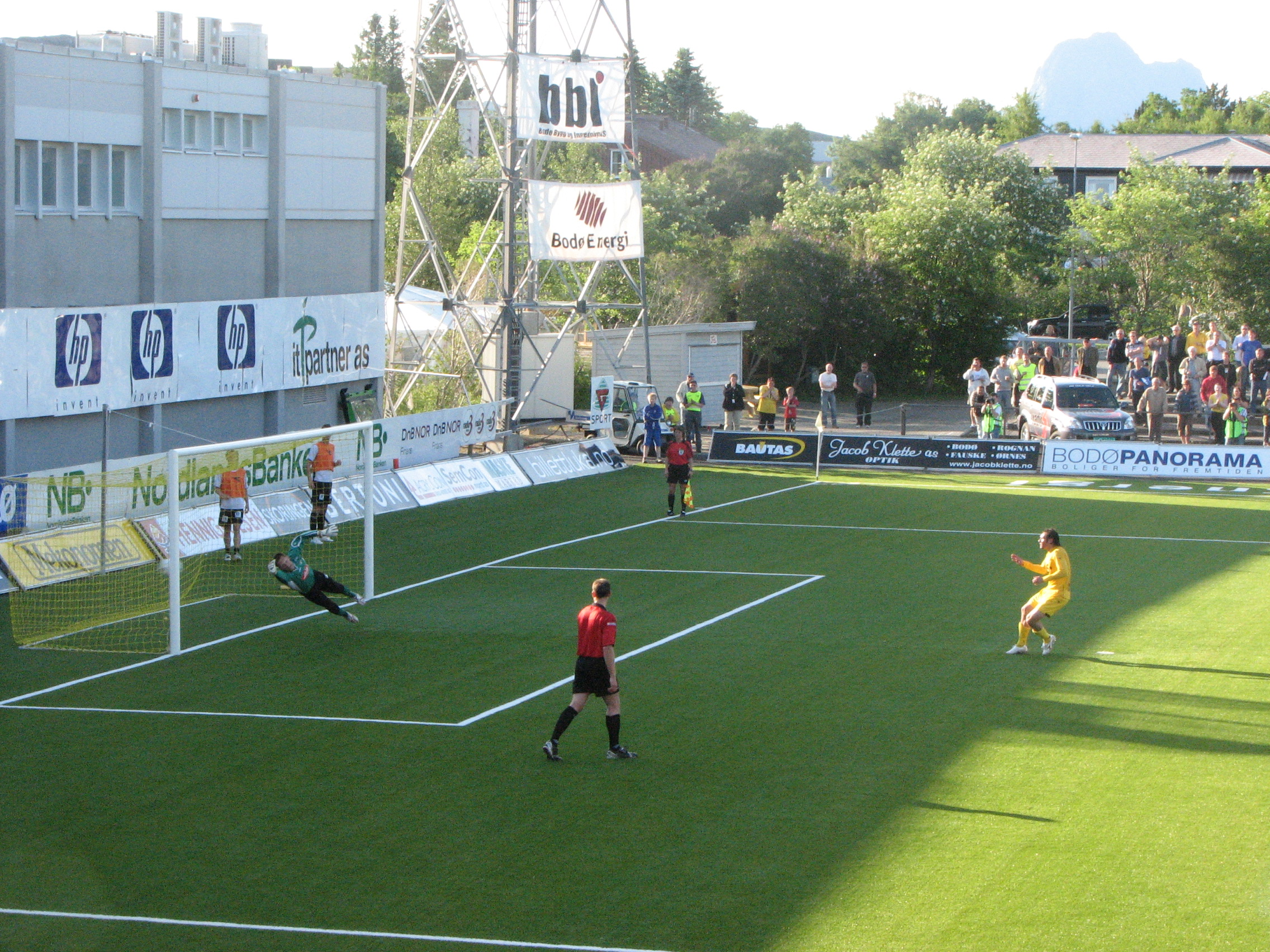
Thiago Martins scoring on a penalty kick against Sogndal in a 2007 Norwegian First Division match. The west end of the stadium lacks stands.

Construction started in October 1999, costing NOK 140 million. A new south stand was built with a roof, offices and change rooms, while a smaller stand without a roof was built to the east. The project cost NOK 40 million less than the original plans, in part because no stands were built on the west end. The two new stands had 4,350 seats and the venue was approved for UEFA matches. However, the venue was not allowed to use the old grandstand seating or the terraces for UEFA matches. The two new stands gave the stadium seating for 6,100 and standing room for 2,000 spectators. The first match at the upgraded venue was played on 22 April 2001.

The project also included 6,900 square meters (74,000 sq ft) of commercial property, which was rented out to 13 companies. The commercial part of the stadium was owned by Aspmyra Næringsbygg, which was again owned by several local investors. The stadium received new floodlights, which were bought used from Ullevaal Stadion in Oslo for NOK 5 million. However, there were some initial complaints from Bodø Airport as the lights were a distraction for pilots. The club also considered installing artificial turf, and applied to be UEFA's partner to receive a grant to install a pilot turf, but this was instead awarded to Eyravallen in Sweden. On 2 December 2002, Nordlandsbanken bought a third of the shares in Aspmyra Eiendomsutvikling from the club, for NOK 10 million, to avoid that the club went bankrupt. In 2003, Bodø/Glimt's spent NOK 650,000 on rent and NOK 700,000 in operating costs for the venue.

As compensation for removing the track and field sections, the stadium company had to pay for a new municipal athletics venue at Mørkvedlia. The sales stadium's contract also required Aspmyra Eiendomsutvikling to build new change room facilities for the training pitch so the uses from teams had the same quality as the main pitch. The company was criticized by the municipality in 2002 for not prioritizing this obligation. The NOK 170,000 it cost to move Grand's club house and build a change room for the artificial field was covered jointly by the municipality, Grand, Aspmyra Eiendomsutvikling and one of Glimt's sponsors, Nordland Entreprenør.

In 2003, Aspmyra Næringseiendom converted its debt, then NOK 20.5 million, to Swiss francs. Because of the transaction, within a year the company's debt had increased by 10 percent. In 2004, the stadium ownership company changed its name to Aspmyra Stadion AS. The municipality eliminated the stadium company's debt of NOK 5.5 million to the municipality in November 2005. This allowed the club's operating company to have a positive share capital and the club was thus allowed to keep its license. In May 2006, the grass pitch was replaced with artificial pitch, costing NOK 3.1 million. The training pitch received new turf in 2007.

Following Glimt's promotion to the top league in 2008, the club stated that Aspmyra was "out of date" and that investments for NOK 200 million was necessary if the club was to remain in the top tier. Chair Benn Eidissen stated that while Aspmyra was among the country's most modern venues in 2001, it would within a few years no longer be in the top-25. He identified funding from regionally differentiated payroll tax (DA-funds), public grants and funding for sponsors as the main sources of financing. Imminent upgrades to the venue for NOK 10 million were done ahead of the 2008 season—financed using DA-funds. It consisted of two specific grants, a NOK 2.2 million subsidy and a ten-year NOK 8.3 million interest and installment-free loan, both to the club. In 2009, the bank deleted NOK 5 million of the stadium debt, reducing it to NOK 14.2 million.

In 2009, Innovation Norway criticized Nordland County Municipality, who administrated the DA-funds, stating that both the grant and load to Glimt were illegal. Therefore, both were converted to an interest-bearing loan and were issued to Aspmyra Stadion instead of the club. The club is required to have positive equity to keep its license to play in the top two tiers. Because it was the majority shareholder of the stadium company, it filed consolidated accounts which also include the equity of Aspmyra Stadion AS. Thus, the consequence of Innovation Norway's proceedings was that the club risked ending up with a negative equity and could be relegated to the third tier. To secure it retained a positive equity, Glimt proposed selling the venue to the municipality.

The municipal council voted on 17 February 2011 to purchase the stadium. The strongest proponents were the Labour Party and the Conservative Party, while three parties, the Progress Party, the Liberal Party and Red Party, voted against. The proponents argued that municipality was purchasing the venue with a much higher value than what they had sold, while the opponents argued that it was not the municipality's responsibility to give financial first-aid to a professional sports club. The cost was NOK 16 million, paid for by taking over debt. After taking over the stadium company, the municipality merged it with Bodø Spektrum, which runs an indoor sports complex, including Nordlandshallen. This allows the debt to be taken over by the municipality without interfering with the municipal accounts.

The venue saw only minor improvements to the infrastructure over the next decade, but following Glimt's success in 2020 by winning the league and making its first appearance in the qualifying rounds for UEFA Champions League a new stand was built at the west end of the pitch, adding 660 seats to the stadium. During spring 2022 a new stand was built over the standing area in front of the old stand on the north side. This raised the seated capacity by approx. 1,900 to 8,270 seats total in time for the 2022 Norwegian season and together with other improvements in spectator, VIP and media facilities will bring the stadium within UEFA category 4 to be used for group stage matches in European leagues. For their 2021–22 European campaign, Bodø/Glimt was given a dispensation from the capacity requirements by UEFA partly due to COVID restrictions limiting the number of spectators in any case, but the dispensation will not be extended for 2022–23.

== Facilities ==
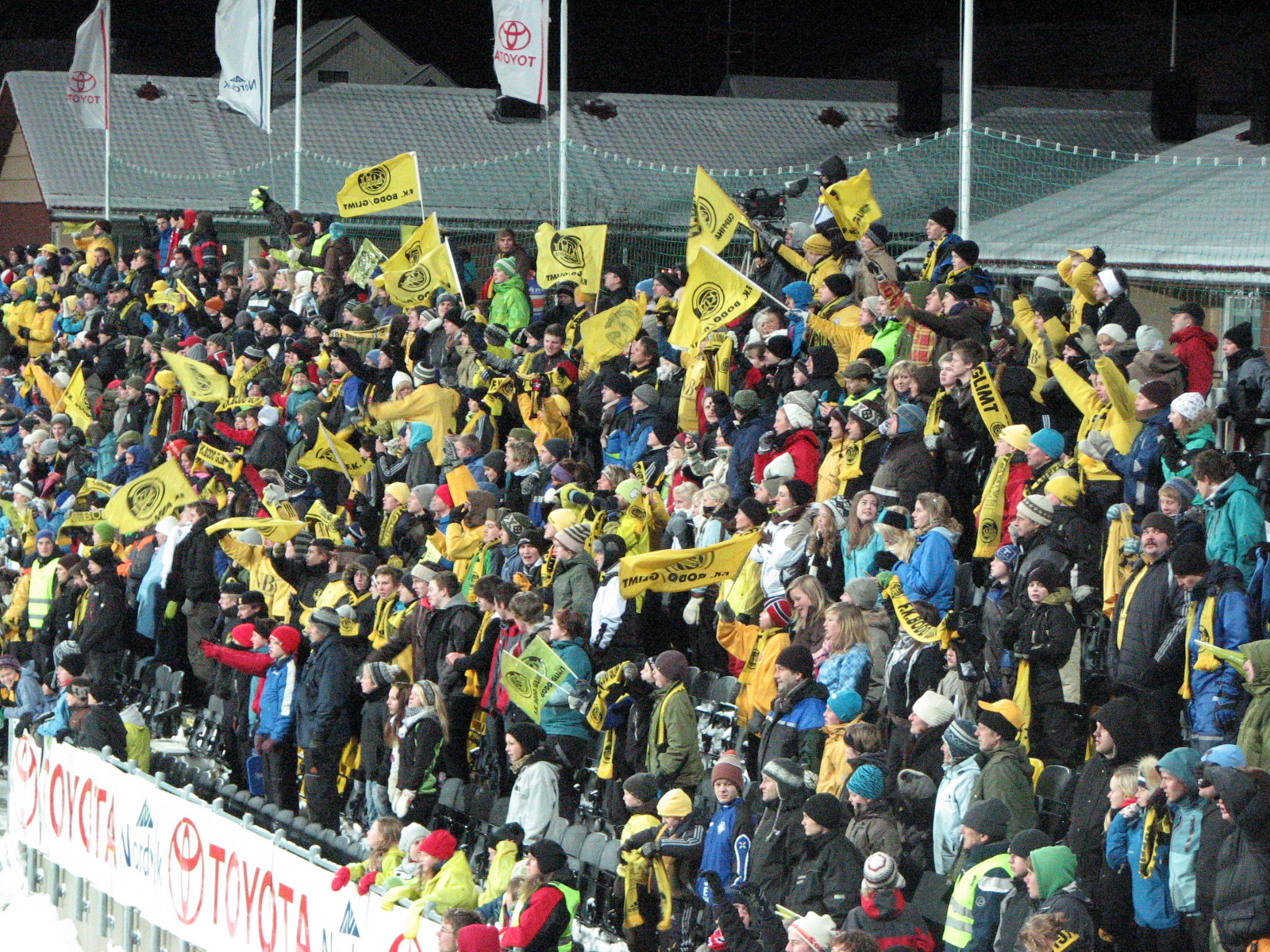
Glimt supporters on the East Stand

The venue is located in the southern part of the town center of Bodø, on Hålogalandsgata, close to Bodø Airport. The venue has a capacity for 8,270 seated spectators. The South Stand has 15 luxury boxes, each with seating for 12 people, and club seating for an additional 100 people in Aspmyra Sportsbar; this is only available for corporate sponsors. Both the sports bar and the boxes have access to dinners before the match. The stand is combined with a commercial and residential building, which is owned by Aspmyra Næringsbygg, which is again controlled by Gunvald Johansen. Bodø/Glimt's offices are located in this section, which along with the public access is rented by Glimt. Of sponsorship reasons, the South Stand is named for Diadora.

The North Stand is the oldest part of the venue and is owned by Aspmyra AS. For sponsorship reasons, it is named after Nordlandsbanken. The area behind the East Stand was bought by Bodø Boligbyggelag, who built housing there and is named after Toyota, again for sponsorship reasons. In 2010, the operating costs of the venue were NOK 2 million.

== Events ==
Bodø/Glimt are the main tenant at Aspmyra. The record attendance dates from 1975, when 12,189 people attended a Norwegian Football Cup match against Viking. From the 1977 season, Bodø/Glimt played in the First Division, then the top tier of the pyramid. The club remained in to the top flight until it was relegated after the 1980 season. Glimt had a poor spell during the 1980s, playing several seasons in the Third Division. On 5 October 1986, Aspmyra hosted the final of the Junior Football Cup between Bodø/Glimt and Lillestrøm. At the end of 1991, Glimt was promoted to the First Division, then the second tier of the pyramid. However, in the 1992 season, the club played at Nordlandshallen. From the 1993 season, Bodø/Glimt again played in the top flight. Twice, in 1993 and 1997, the final match of the season had to be played in Nordlandshallen because of the poor condition of the turf. Following the installation of floodlights in 2001, the attendance increased by 70 percent at floodlighted evening games, resulting in an increase in the use of evening matches during the spring and fall. Glimt remained in the Premier League until the end of the 2005 season, when they were relegated. They returned again for the 2008 season, but were relegated after the 2009 seasons.

Aspmyra was used for UEFA Cup Winners' Cup matches in the late 1970s. Bodø/Glimt played Napoli in 1976–77, and Union Luxembourg and Internazionale in 1978–79. During the 1990s, Bodø/Glimt was allowed to play qualification matches for UEFA tournaments at Aspmyra, but the venue was not suitable for games in the ordinary rounds because of lack of floodlights. In the 1994–95 Cup Winners' Cup, Glimt played Olimpija Rīga at Aspmyra, but had to play against Sampdoria at Ullevaal Stadion. The team's 1996–97 UEFA Cup match against Trabzonspor was played at Ullevaal, although the qualification match against Beitar Jerusalem had been played at Aspmyra. Similarly, in the 1999–2000 UEFA Cup, the qualification against Vaduz was played at Aspmyra, while the first round match against Werder Bremen was played at Lerkendal Stadion in Trondheim. With an upgraded venue, Bodø/Glimt was again allowed to play all their home matches in UEFA tournaments at Aspmyra. In the 2004–05 UEFA Cup, Bodø/Glimt was visited by Levadia Tallinn and Beşiktaş.

In addition to Bodø/Glimt, Grand Bodø also plays matches at Aspmyra. This includes their women's team, which has previously played in the Women's Premier League. They most recently played in the top league in 2007, when they drew an average 222 spectators. During the 1980s, Grand's men's club became the town's best, playing in the Second Division, the tier above Glimt.

The venue hosted the Norwegian Athletics Championships in 1980. The following year, it held the women's semi-final in the 1981 European Cup in Athletics. Aspmyra has hosted one Norway national football team match, which resulted in 1–1 against Iceland and filling the venue with 8,126 spectators on 22 May 2002. This still stands as the venue's record attendance after the rebuilding. In August 2007, the Norwegian women's U-23 team played Sweden at Aspmyra. Concerts held at the venue include Bryan Adams in 2008. In September 2012, the venue hosted the final of the Norwegian rugby league championship between Bodø Barbarians and Oslo Capitals, which the Capitals winning 34–24.

== Future ==
In 2008, the club stated that they would either have to renovate Aspmyra for NOK 200 million or build a new stadium elsewhere to remain competitive at a premiership level. Funding was proposed to be a mix of public and sponsor grants, including DA-funds. As part of the planning of a joint Norwegian and Swedish bid for the Euro 2016, Bodø Municipality and Bodø/Glimt proposed that Bodø could build a stadium at Rønvikjordene, in the northern part of the town. The plans were presented in late July 2008; the venue was planned to have a capacity for 30,000 to 35,000 spectators, but would be rebuilt after the tournament to seat 10,000 to 15,000. It was estimated that Bodø/Glimt would need a capacity for 10,000 to 15,000 spectators. In comparison, the population of Bodø was 46,049 in 2008. The new venue was estimated to cost NOK 500 to 700 million and was largely proposed financed with DA-funds. Minister of Culture, Trond Giske, stated that at least one of the venues would have to be in Northern Norway to receive government support for an application. Aspmyra was planned used as a training pitch. Bodø was discarded for the Scandinavian bid, which ultimately was never sent to UEFA. For Aspmyra, the municipality has stated that they have the long-term option to purchase the real estate north of the pitch and can build a new stand there. Alternatively, an estimated NOK 3 million can be used to demolish the stand and redevelop it as a commercial property.

Several possible development schemes for the stadium were presented over the coming decade, but none of them were put into action due to lack of funding and the fact that results and spectator numbers did not make better facilities necessary. Following the continued success of the club from 2019 and onward, a plan has been put forward to build a new stadium on the other side of town, with an 8–10 000 capacity. The project is being developed with a planned date of completion in fall of 2024, when Bodø will be European Capital of Culture.

On 11 September 2025, the team revealed a plan to build a 10,000-seat stadium at Thalleveiåkeren, located just outside central Bodø.

== Bibliography ==
- Arntzen, Børre; Finne, Arne; Ludvigsen, Frank (1994). Suksess som bestilt (in Norwegian). Finarr. ISBN 82-993150-1-8.
- Fagerli, Arnfinn; Nilsen, Christian Lunde (1999). Norsk fotball-leksikon (in Norwegian). Orion. ISBN 82-458-0398-7.
