= Anstein Gjengedal =

Norwegian police chief (born 1944)

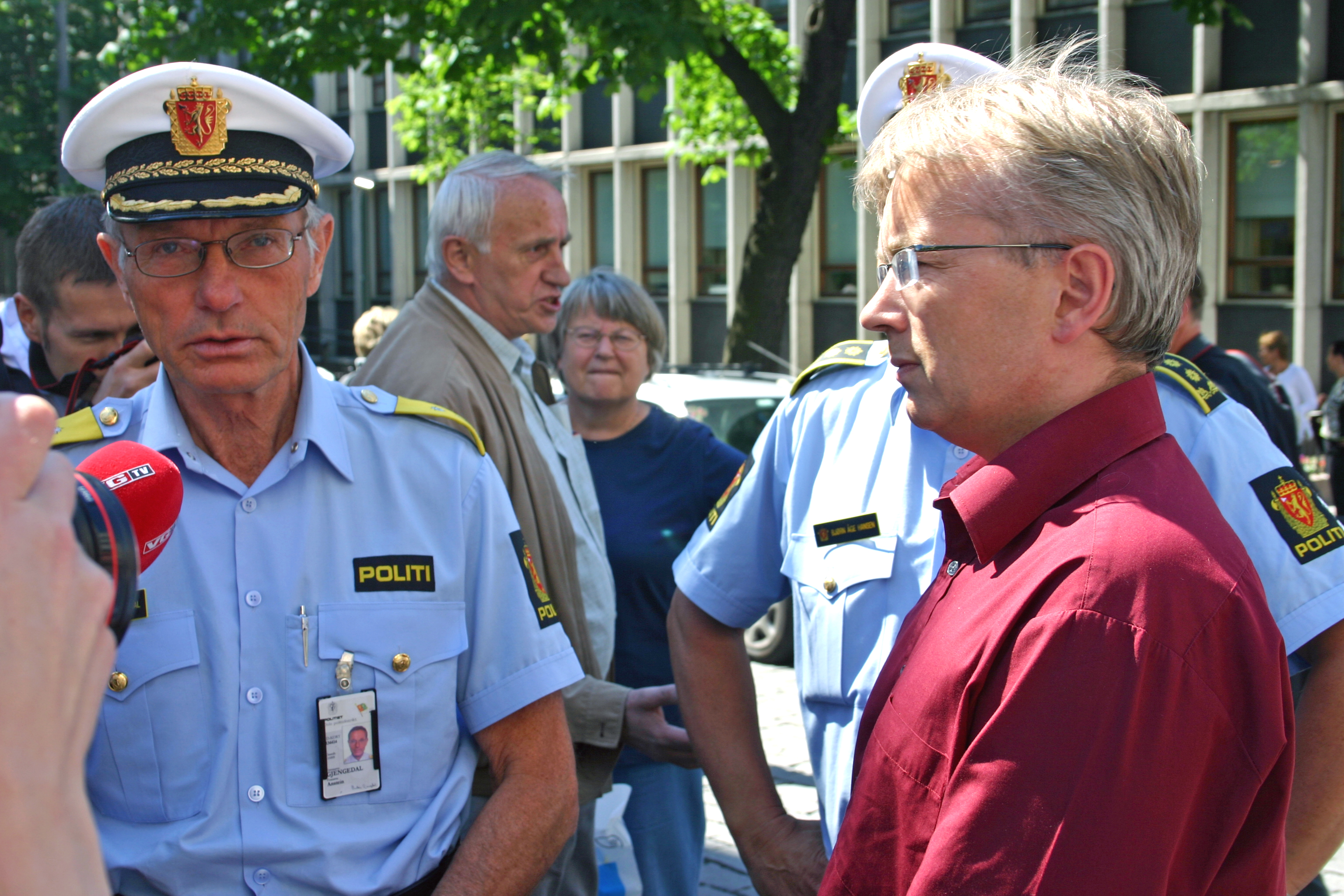
Anstein Gjengedal (left).

Anstein Birger Gjengedal (born 26 November 1944) is a former Norwegian police chief.

He was born in Lom Municipality. He was a public prosecutor in Eidsivating from 1977 until 1989 when he became deputy director of the Norwegian National Authority for the Investigation and Prosecution of Economic and Environmental Crime. He then served as director from 1996 to 2000, and in 2000 he became Chief of Police of Oslo, until his successor Hans Sverre Sjøvold took over in June 2012.

He is currently the director for the Prosecution Committee in Anti-doping Norge. He has been an ever-present member of the Trial Committee for the Norwegian Skating Association since being elected in 1980.

In his youth Gjengedal competed as a speed skater for Lom Idrettslag until 1961 and then joined Lillehammer Skøiteklubb for the seasons 1961/62–1963/64 and from 1964/65-season he changed his club again and this time to Oslo Idrettslag.

Police appointments
Preceded by Lars Oftedal Broch	Director of the Norwegian National Authority for the Investigation and Prosecution of Economic and Environmental Crime; 1996–2000	Succeeded by Einar Høgetveit
Preceded by Ingelin Killengreen	Chief of Police of Oslo; 2000–2012	Succeeded by Hans Sverre Sjøvold
