= Odd Reidar Humlegård =

Norwegian lawyer and civil servant

Odd Reidar Humlegård (born 9 May 1961, in Porsgrunn) is a Norwegian lawyer, civil servant who served as the National Police Commissioner between 2012 and 2018. Humlegård previously served as head of the National Criminal Investigation Service, and was appointed as director to the National Police Directorate in August 2012 after the controversial resignation of Øystein Mæland.

== Career ==
Humlegård first joined the Norwegian police in 1984, after graduating from Norwegian Police University College, having previously received officer's training at the Military Academy. He later enrolled in- and graduated from law school in 1992. From 2003 he served as head of the National Mobile Police Service, before he was appointed to the National Criminal Investigation Service in 2009. He was responsible for the investigation of many high-profile cases during his tenure, such as The Pocket Man in 2009.

In the wake of the sudden resignation of Øystein Mæland in 2012, he was promptly appointed to the position as the next Police Commissioner, basically in charge of the whole police force. He didn't seek re-appointment in 2018 and was succeeded by Marie Benedicte Bjørnland.

Police appointments
Preceded by Øystein Mæland	Director of the National Police Directorate; 2012–2018	Succeeded by Marie Benedicte Bjørnland
Preceded by Odd Olsen Ingerø	Director of the National Criminal Investigation Service; 2009–2012	Succeeded by Ketil Haukaas
