= Sjøvold =

Sjøvold is a Norwegian surname. Notable people with the surname include:

- Fredrik Sjøvold (born 2003), Norwegian footballer
- Hans Sverre Sjøvold (born 1957), Norwegian civil servant and police chief
