= Arnstein Øverkil =

Arnstein Øverkil (29 March 1937 – 27 February 2014) was a Norwegian police chief and civil servant.

He was born in Hegra, and from 1985 to 2002 he was the chief of police in Asker and Bærum Police District. In 2003 he was appointed as acting director of the Norwegian Police Security Service. He left in 2004 when a permanent replacement for Per Sefland finally was found.

Øverkil came to the Police Security Service from the job as police advisor for Yassir Arafat, with whom he gained contact during the Oslo Process. Øverkil was also a central member of the Temporary International Presence in Hebron. He was in Hebron during the incident of February 2006 when TIPH observers were attacked by Palestinians and withdrawn. The attack had a connection to the Jyllands-Posten Muhammad cartoons controversy.

He was a freemason, and resided in Asker.

Øverkil died on 27 February 2014 from natural causes.

Civic offices
| Preceded by Per Sefland | Director of the Norwegian Police Security Service; 2003–2004 (acting) | Succeeded by Jørn Holme |
