= Gunnar Haarstad =

Norwegian jurist and police officer

Gunnar Haarstad (12 November 1916 – 13 April 1992) was a Norwegian jurist and police officer, a resistance member during World War II, and later head of the Norwegian Police Surveillance Agency for fifteen years.

== Early life and career ==
Haarstad was born in Nittedal Municipality as the son of police sergeant Jørgen Haarstad and Agnes Azora Bordoe. One of his hobbies was sports shooting. He competed at the national competition Landsskytterstevnet several times, winning his junior class three years in a row. In his first senior year he placed fourth. He was also present at the 1937 ISSF World Shooting Championships in Helsinki, where he participated in a shooting competition between the Scandinavian capitals. Among his school friends from Secondary School was Tore Gjelsvik, who took private shooting lessons from him early in 1940. After finishing his secondary education at the Oslo Cathedral School in 1936, he studied law at the University of Oslo, and graduated as cand.jur. in 1941. His first job was as a junior solicitor in Halden Municipality. From 1942 he worked at the police in Oslo. He married Inger Tøger-Lie in 1942.

== Resistance work ==
During the German invasion of Norway in April 1940 Haarstad participated in the Norwegian Campaign. Later he took part in various resistance activities, including working for the clandestine intelligence organization XU. He was arrested by the Germans 11 June 1944 and held at Møllergata 19 until 14 February 1945, when he was incarcerated at the Grini concentration camp until end of the war.

== Post-war career ==
Haarstad participated as a police investigator during the legal purge in Norway after World War II. From 1948 he became second-in-command under leader Asbjørn Bryhn at the Norwegian Police Surveillance Agency (Norwegian: Politiets Overvåkningstjeneste, POT). From 1958 to 1967 he was Chief of Police of Sør-Varanger Municipality. When Bryhn had to leave POT in 1967, Haarstad returned to the Police Surveillance Agency, as the next leader, and led the service until he retired in 1982. After his retirement he published the book I hemmelig tjeneste. Etterretning og overvåkning i krig og fred in 1988. He died in Bærum Municipality in 1992.

Police appointments
Preceded by Asbjørn Bryhn	Director of the Norwegian Police Surveillance Agency; 1967–1982	Succeeded by Jostein Erstad
