= Norwegian Directorate for Cultural Heritage =

Government agency

Directorate for Cultural Heritage
- Direktoratet for kulturminneforvaltning

Agency overview
- Formed: 1912
- Jurisdiction: Government of Norway
- Headquarters: Oslo
- Agency executive: Hanna Geiran (2018-), Riksantikvar
- Parent agency: Norwegian Ministry of the Environment
- Website: www.riksantikvaren.no

The Directorate for Cultural Heritage (Norwegian: Riksantikvaren or Direktoratet for kulturminneforvaltning) is a government agency responsible for the management of cultural heritage in Norway. Subordinate to the Norwegian Ministry of the Environment, it manages the Cultural Heritage Act of June 9, 1978. The directorate also has responsibilities under the Norwegian Planning and Building Law.

== Cultural Heritage Management in Norway ==
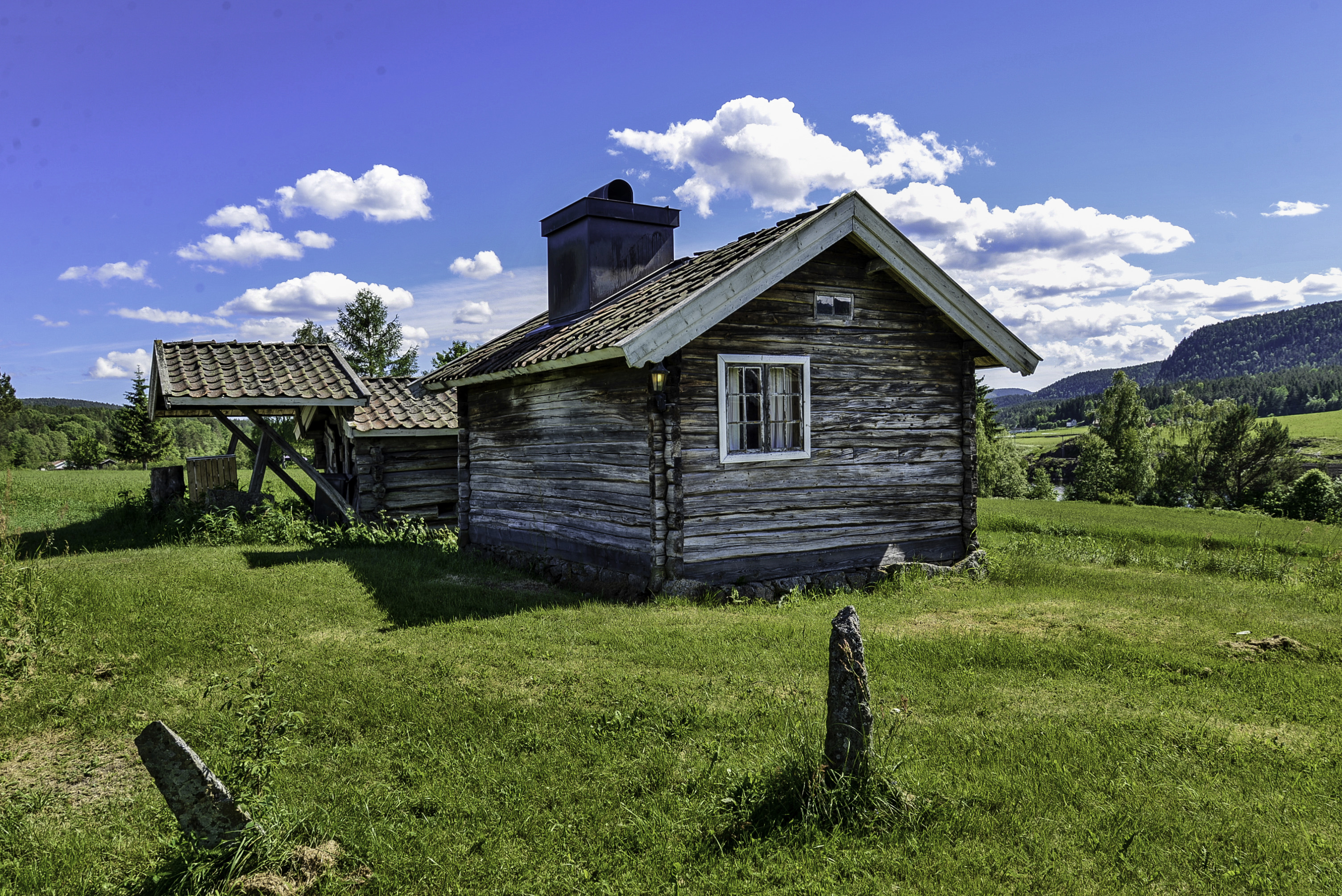
Photo of a monument in Norway in the Norwegian Directorate for Cultural Heritage database.

The directorate for Cultural Heritage Management is responsible for management on the national level. At the regional level the county municipalities are responsible for the management in their county. The Sami Parliament is responsible for management of Sámi heritage. On the island of Svalbard, the Governor of Svalbard maintains management responsibilities. For archaeological excavations there are five chartered archeological museums.

== History ==
The work with cultural heritage started in the early 1900s, and the first laws governing heritage findings came in 1905, with the first law protecting heritage buildings appearing in 1920. The post as National Antiquarian was established in 1912. When the Ministry of the Environment was created in 1972 the responsibility was transferred there, and the current law for cultural heritage is dated June 9, 1978, replacing the two older laws. The post was made a directorate on July 1, 1988.

=== List of National Antiquarians ===
- 1912–1913 Herman Major Schirmer
- 1913–1946 Harry Fett
- 1946–1958 Arne Nygård-Nilssen
- 1958–1977 Roar Hauglid
- 1978–1991 Stephan Tschudi-Madsen
- 1991–1997 Øivind Lunde (leave of absence since 1995)
- 1997–2009 Nils Marstein (acting since 1995)
- 2009–2009 Sjur Helseth (acting)
- 2009–2018 Jørn Holme
- 2018–present Hanna Geiran
