= Beate Gangås =

Norwegian police officer and civil servant

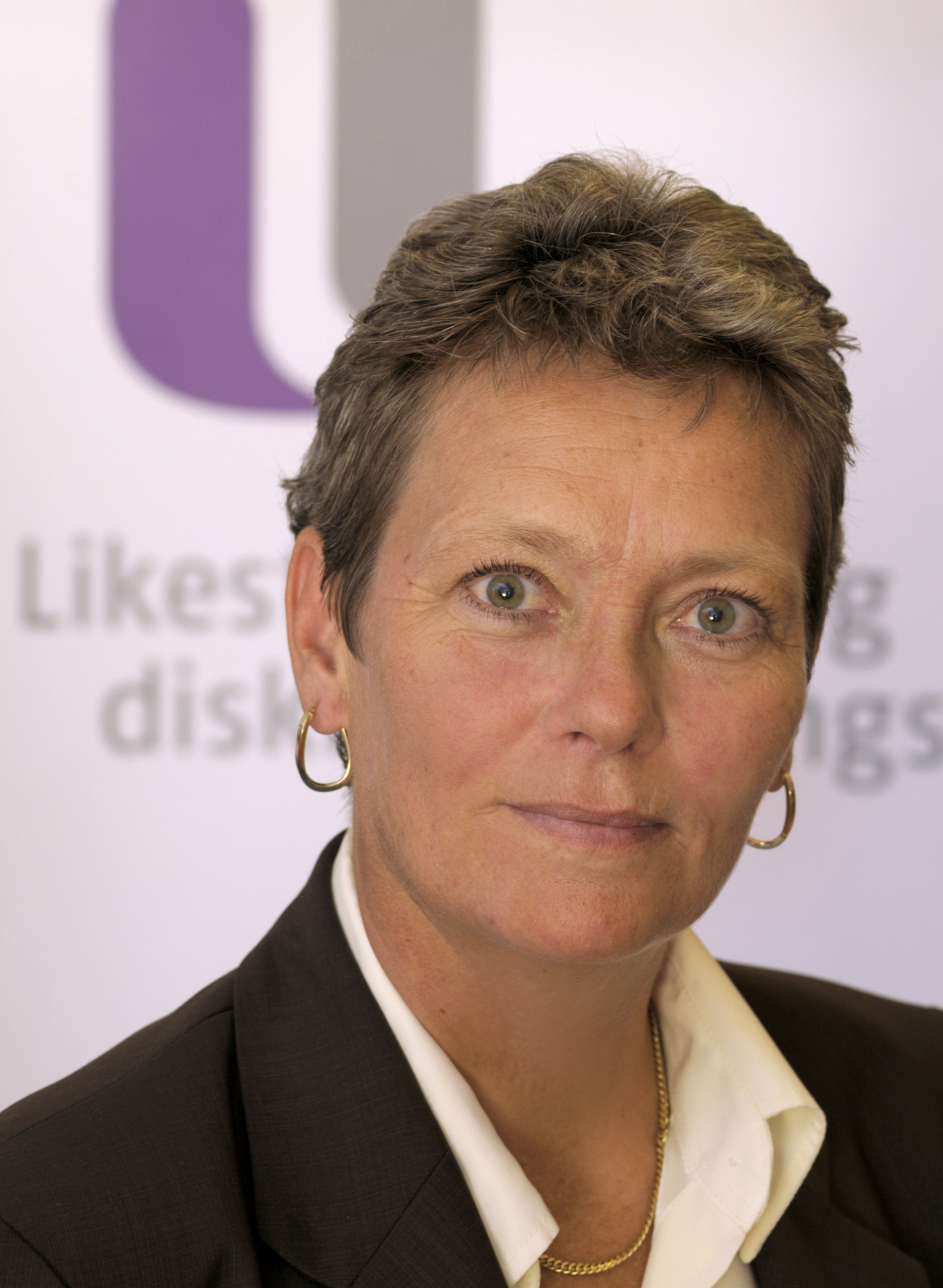
- Gangås in 2008

Director of the Norwegian Police Security Service
- Incumbent
- Assumed office 1 December 2022
- Deputy: Inga Bejer Engh
- Preceded by: Hans Sverre Sjøvold

Chief of Police of Oslo
- In office 12 August 2019 – 30 November 2022
- Deputy: Bjørn Vandvik; Cecilie Lilaas-Skari
- Preceded by: Hans Sverre Sjøvold
- Succeeded by: Ida Melbo Øystese

Personal details
- Born: 24 April 1963 (age 63) Asker, Norway
- Occupation: Police officer Civil servant

Beate Gangås (born 24 April 1963) is a Norwegian police officer and civil servant. She is currently the director of the Norwegian Police Security Service since 2022. She previously served as the Oslo Chief of Police from 2019 to 2022.

Gangås was born in Asker and played football for the local football club as a young person.

She graduated from the University of Oslo with the cand.jur. degree in 1991. She worked for the Norwegian Directorate for Health from 1991 to 1992, served as a police prosecutor in Vest-Finnmark in 1992 before being hired in the Oslo police. From 2001 to 2006, she worked in the National Police Directorate. In 2006, she was appointed as the Norwegian Equality and Anti-Discrimination Ombud, a merger between the Centre for Equality, the Equality Ombud and the Centre Against Ethnic Discrimination. She became the chief of police in Østfold Police District in 2010, and in Oslo Police District in 2019.

In October 2022, she was appointed director of the Norwegian Police Security Service. She assumed office on 1 December.

Openly lesbian, she became the first LGBT police chief in Norway.
