= Margrethe Haarr =

Norwegian politician

- Born: 10 April 1985 (age 41)
- Occupation: Politician
- Political party: Centre Party

Margrethe Haarr (born 10 April 1985) is a Norwegian politician for the Centre Party.

== Biography ==
Born on 10 April 1985, Haarr is educated from the Lillehammer University College, and worked as environmental therapist in Kongsvinger.

She was elected as a deputy representative to the Storting from the constituency of Hedmark for the terms 2017–2021 and 2021–2025. She moved up to replace Emilie Mehl as a member of Parliament in 2021, when Mehl was appointed to Støre's Cabinet. She has been the mayor of Kongsvinger Municipality.

In the Storting, she has been a member of the Standing Committee on Family and Cultural Affairs since 2021.
