= Royal Police Escort =

Royal police in the Kingdom of Norway

- Coat of arms

Jurisdictional structure
- Operations jurisdiction: Norway

The Royal Police Escort (Norwegian: Den Kongelige Politieskorte) is the royal police in the Kingdom of Norway. Responsible for safeguarding the King and members of the Royal Family, the Royal Police Escort serves mostly as a bodyguard unit during official and private activities within the Kingdom and abroad. The Royal Police Escort also guards foreign royalty on their official or private visits in Norway and foreign (including Republican) heads of state on their official visits.

== History ==
The Royal Police Escort was established on 11 May 1945, shortly before Crown Prince Olav's returned to the Kingdom following the end of the five-year-long German occupation.

In 2012, RPE officers provided protection for ammunition being brought to the FSK when an unknown person made threats against the Norwegian government. The person was later arrested.

In 2022, command of the RPE was moved to the PST.

== Organization ==
A section of the Norwegian Police Service, the Royal Police Escort is under the Oslo Chief of Police. They cooperate closely with the Norwegian Police Security Service. Members of the Royal Police Escort are individually selected and especially trained police officers.

The coat of arms of the Royal Police Escort displays a golden St. Olaf axe on a red shield.

== Links ==
- The Royal Court: The Norwegian Royal Police Escort (Visited on 3 July 2013.)
- Verdens Gang: Dette er kongens millioneskorte (Visited on 3 July 2013.)
