= Erling Brinchmann =

Norwegian police chief

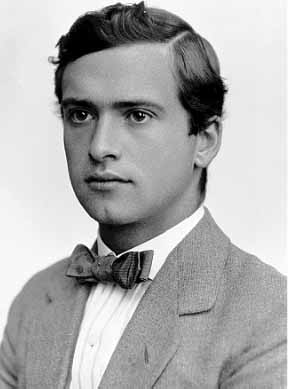
Brinchmann in 1923

Erling Brinchmann (21 March 1897 – 29 August 1988) was a Norwegian chief of police.

He was born in Trondhjem. After finishing his secondary education in 1915, he studied law and graduated with the cand.jur. degree from the Royal Frederick University in 1920. Following a time as deputy judge, he worked in a bank before being hired as police prosecutor in Inntrøndelag in 1923.

He was a police prosecutor in Oslo from 1928 and public prosecutor of Østfold and Hedmark in 1939. From 1946 to 1966 he was the police chief of Bergen.

He was known for his benign appearance and as a guitar player. He was a member of the Friends of Folk Song Club (Norwegian: Visens venner). Upon retiring he was decorated as a Knight, First Class of the Order of St. Olav. He lived for a few years in Oslo before emigrating to Copenhagen, where he died in 1988.

Police appointments
Preceded by Carl Frøseth	Chief of Police of Bergen; 1946–1966	Succeeded by Asbjørn Bryhn
