= Urdahl =

Urdahl is a surname. Notable people with the surname include:

- Dean Urdahl (born 1949), American politician
- Stevelin Urdahl (born 1967), Norwegian actor
- Sverre Lassen-Urdahl (1913–2005), Norwegian alpine skier

== See also ==
- Urdal
