= Øystein Mæland =

Norwegian psychiatrist and political figure

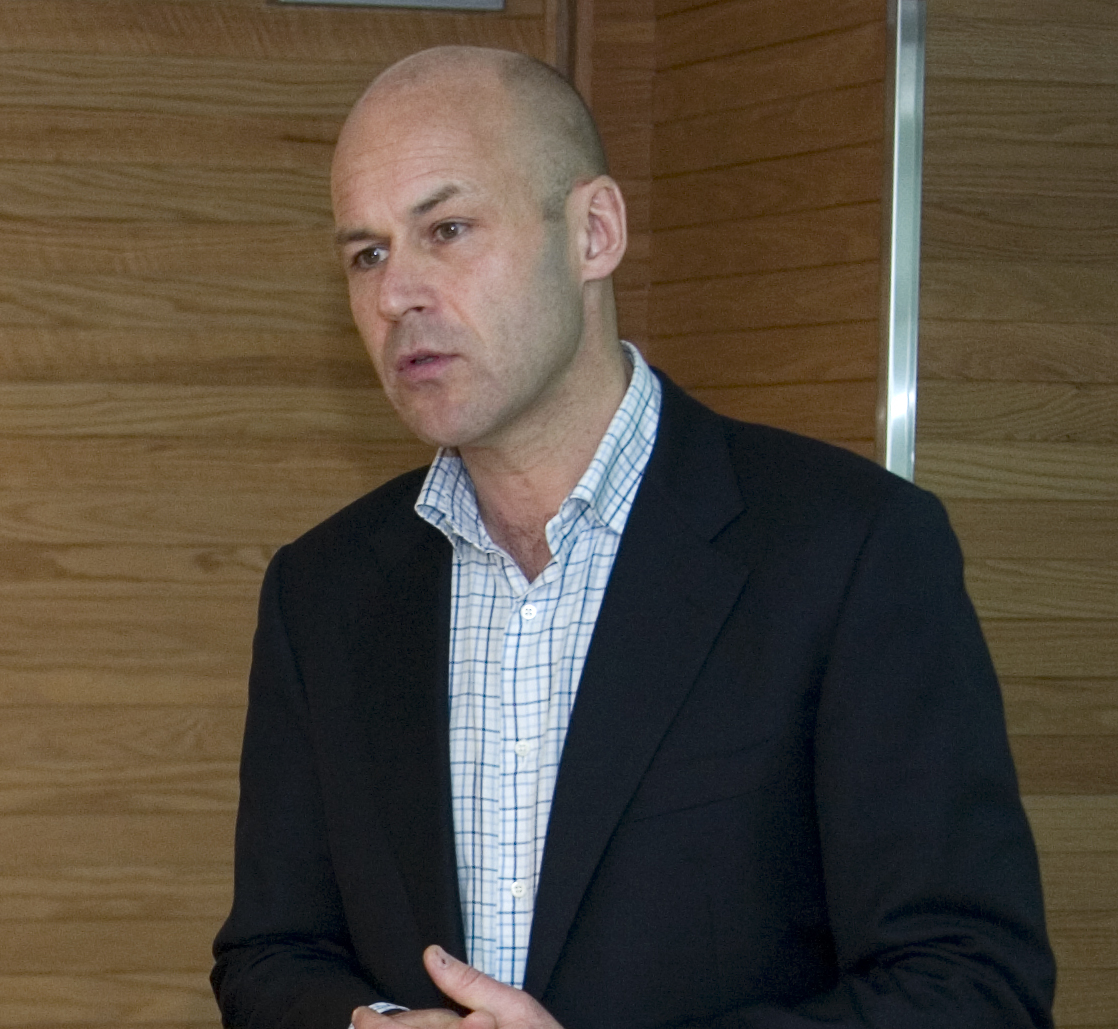
- Born: 26 March 1960 (age 65); Rjukan, Norway
- Education: Cand.med.
- Alma mater: University of Oslo
- Occupations: Psychiatrist, Politician
- Known for: Director of the National Police Directorate; Director of Akershus University Hospital
- Spouse: Rolf Aspestrand
- Children: 2

Øystein Mæland (born 26 March 1960) is a Norwegian psychiatrist, civil servant and politician for the Labour Party. In 2011, Mæland was appointed director of the National Police Directorate, a position he retained until August 2012 when he resigned in the wake of the Gjørv Report. He has since 2014 been director of Akershus University Hospital.

== Early life and education ==
Mæland was born in Rjukan in Telemark county in 1960 to parents Einar and Bjørg Mæland, but grew up in the neighborhood of Hoff in the borough of Ullern in Oslo. His father was a plant foreman at Ringnes brewery, his mother attended to the office of the Norwegian Union of Municipal Employees. Both of his parents were active in the Workers' Youth League and Mæland states that "political debate around the dinner-table" became part of his upbringing. He attended medical school at the University of Oslo and took the cand.med. degree in 1986.

== Career ==
=== Early career ===
After completing his mandatory residency, he was between 1989 and 1990 employed as the prison doctor at Ullersmo Prison. He worked as a physician from 1989 to 1994 and 1997 to 2000, and was chief physician at Aker University Hospital before becoming head of the psychiatric division at Ullevål University Hospital between 2004 and 2009.

=== Political career ===
Mæland led the Oslo chapter of the Workers' Youth League from 1979 to 1982, and was a central board member from 1983 to 1989. During this period he met and made friends with a number of youth politicians, among them were future prime minister Jens Stoltenberg, future bankier and CEO of Norway's largest bank Rune Bjerke, as well as future ministers Hanne Harlem, Turid Birkeland and Espen Barth Eide. He was a member of Oslo city council from 1983 to 1986. During Brundtland's Second Cabinet, he was a personal secretary both in the Ministry of Foreign Affairs (1988–89) and the Ministry of Petroleum and Energy (1988).

In 1994, during the Brundtland's Third Cabinet, Mælend was a State Secretary in the Ministry of Justice. He held the position for the remainder of Brundtland's tenure, and then a year into Jagland's Cabinet under two different Ministers of Justice Anne Holt and Gerd-Liv Valla. In 2000, when another Labour cabinet Stoltenberg 1 took over, Mæland was again appointed State Secretary in the Ministry of Justice. He held that position until after the 2001 elections, which caused the cabinet to fall. He was also a member of the Norwegian Criminal Cases Review Commission.

=== Director of National Police and resignation ===
In 2011, Mæland was one of two applicants to the position as director of the National Police Directorate replacing outgoing Ingelin Killengreen. The other applicant was Christine Fossen, then Chief of Police in the Southern Buskerud Police District. In the end, Mæland was selected. He was appointed on 27 May 2011, mere weeks before the 2011 Norway attacks. During most of the period following the attacks, Mæland was away on paternity leave On 13 August 2012 the Gjørv Report was released. It found that the authorities in general, and the police in particular, failed massively in protecting the public during the 2011 Norway attacks.

In the aftermath, Mæland stated that he fully accepted the criticism of the commission's findings and intended to remain in his post, there were calls for his immediate resignation which were repeatedly rejected. The same evening the report was released, Mæland himself appeared on television saying he would not resign. Three days later on 16 August 2012, Minister of Justice Grete Faremo, which was Mæland's immediate superior, announced during a live television debate that she would henceforth recuse herself from all matters relating to him, as to avoid a conflict of interest. This was allegedly due to the close professional relationship the two had when Mæland was state secretary for Faremo during the 90's.

This was interpreted by the media as a sign that the minister lacked confidence in Mæland, and that it was a step in the process of removing him from the post altogether. One scholar described it as a "humiliation" and a "sacking". 25 minutes after the ministers announcement, Mæland publicly informed the Minister of his immediate resignation.

=== Later career ===
He became assisting director of the Norwegian Directorate for Health, then in 2014 director of the Akershus University Hospital.

== Personal life ==
Mæland is openly gay, and is married to psychotherapist and relationship counsellor Rolf Nicolay Aspestrand. The couple have two children, both of which were born through surrogacy in the United States and subsequently adopted. Mæland and his family currently resides in the borough of Nordberg in Oslo.

== See also ==
- Fredrik Fasting Torgersen

Police appointments
Preceded by Vidar Refvik (acting)	Director of the National Police Directorate; 2011–2012	Succeeded by Odd Reidar Humlegård
Civic offices
Preceded by Stein Vaaler (acting)	Director of Akershus University Hospital; 2014–present	Succeeded by Incumbent
