= Norwegian Parliamentary Intelligence Oversight Committee =

Committee of the Norwegian Parliament

The Parliament Appointed Committee for Intelligence Oversight Committee' (Norwegian: Stortingets kontrollutvalg for etterretnings-, overvåkings- og sikkerhetstjeneste), commonly known as the EOS Committee (Norwegian: EOS-utvalget) is Norway's body responsible for overseeing public intelligence, surveillance and security services. The body has seven members and is appointed by the Parliament of Norway. The oversight is aimed at the Norwegian Intelligence Service (NIS), the Norwegian Police Security Service (PST), the National Security Authority (NSM) and the Norwegian Defence Security Department (NORDSD) —these are collectively known as the EOS-services. The committee also oversees intelligence, surveillance and security services that are organized through other public bodies.

The work is performed through inspections, both at head offices and at local units. The committee can also investigate matters reported by individuals or on their own initiative. The goal is to safeguard the public by retaining the services within the limits of the law. The committee files an annual report to the parliament, but it is limited due to the amount of classified information that the committee handles. All the members have the highest level of security clearance, both nationally and within NATO.

The committee was established in 1996, following the findings and subsequent public debate related to the Lund Commission. It had concluded that the Norwegian Police Security Service had been involved in extensive illegal political surveillance of left-winged organizations and individuals, in particular during the 1960s and 1970s. The establishment of an oversight committee dealt with a political wish to control the EOS-services and to ensure to not repeat past illegalities. The first committee was appointed in March 1996, and is directly under the parliament and not the government. The previous oversight committee had been appointed by the government, and did not have the mandate to oversee foreign intelligence activities.

As of 2024, the committee is led by Astri Aas-Hansen.
