= Svein Urdal =

Svein Urdal (born 28 November 1941) is a Norwegian jurist.

He was born in Horten, and graduated with the cand.jur. degree in 1970. He was a sub-director at Ullersmo prison from 1972 to 1977, police superintendent in Vadsø from 1977 to 1980, police inspector in Hamar 1980 to 1987 and chief of police in Troms county from 1987 to 1990. In 1990 he was appointed as director of the Norwegian Police Surveillance Agency, but had to resign already in 1991, as it was discovered that the agency had permitted Mossad to interrogate PLO defectors on Norwegian soil. Urdal instead served as chief of police in Tønsberg from 1992 to 2002, and chief of police without portfolio in the National Police Directorate from 2002.

Police appointments
Preceded by Jostein Erstad	Director of the Norwegian Police Surveillance Agency; 1990–1991	Succeeded by Jan Grøndahl (acting)
