= Marie Benedicte Bjørnland =

Norwegian lawyer and civil servant

Benedicte Bjørnland
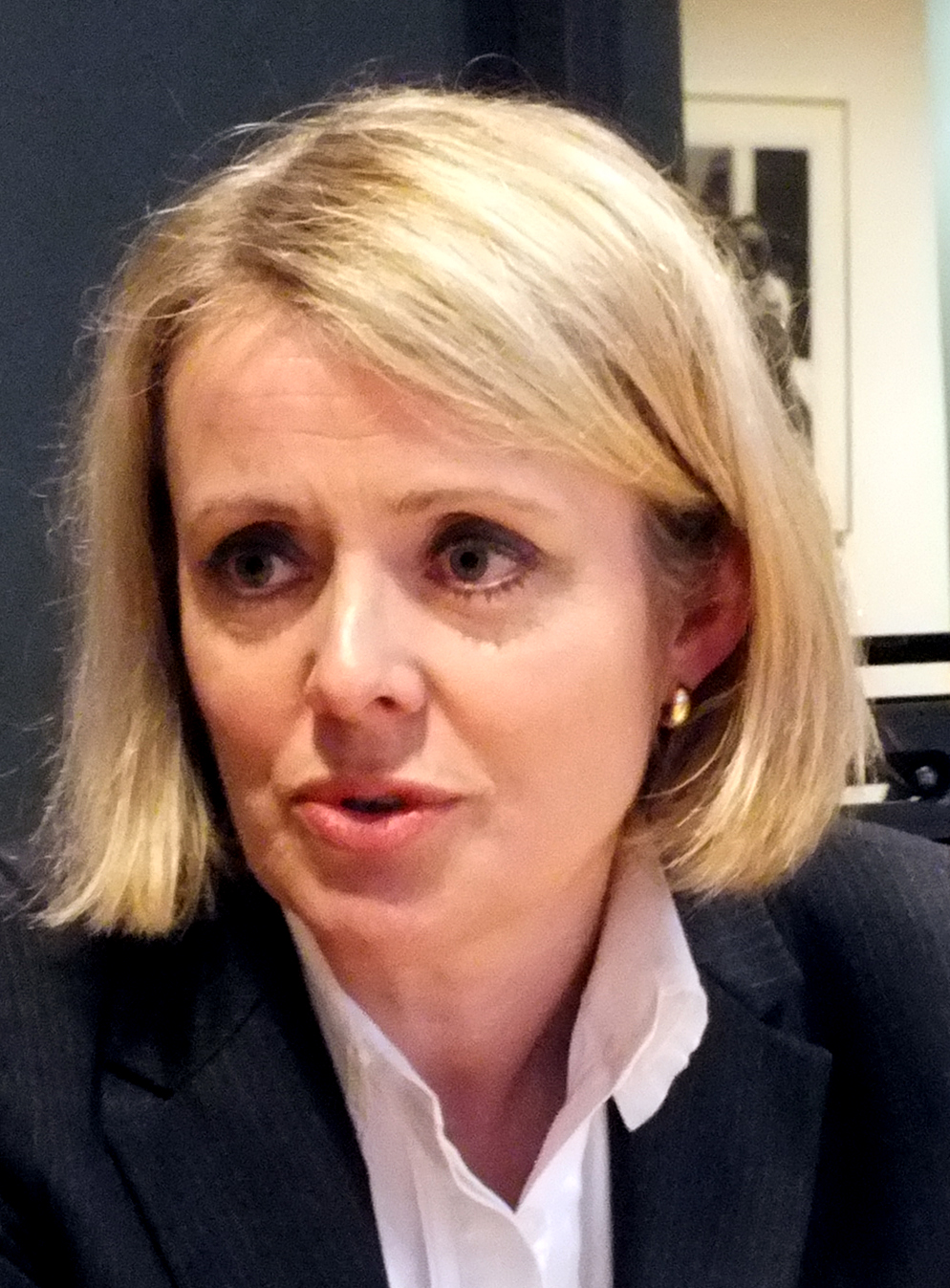

Director of Police
- Incumbent
- Assumed office 1 April 2019
- Preceded by: Odd Reidar Humlegård

Director of the Norwegian Police Security Service
- In office 8 June 2012 – 29 March 2019
- Preceded by: Janne Kristiansen
- Succeeded by: Hans Sverre Sjøvold

Personal details
- Born: Marie Benedicte Bjørnland; 30 April 1965 (age 61) Kristiansand, Vest-Agder, Norway
- Children: 2
- Occupation: Lawyer

Marie Benedicte Bjørnland (born 30 April 1965) is a Norwegian lawyer. She is the current Director of Police since 2019, and was the head of the Norwegian Police Security Service (PST) from 2012 to 2019.

== Career ==
She was born in Kristiansand and grew up in Lier Municipality and Sandefjord Municipality. After obtaining a Master of Law degree from the University of Oslo, she worked as a deputy judge in Skien and Porsgrunn and as a consultant in the Directorate for prices, with most of her career in various positions in the police force, becoming Chief of police in Vestfold in 2007. As part of the latter position, she led the local branch of PST.

Bjørnland was appointed chief of the Police Security Service on 8 June 2012.

In 2016, Bjørnland stated in a radio interview with the Norwegian Broadcasting Corporation that being expressively 'anti-Islam' is enough to be considered as 'right-wing extremist' by the PST.

On 20 December 2018, she was nominated to succeed Odd Reidar Humlegård as director of police. She assumed office on 1 April 2019.

In 2022, she was implicated in a case involving employment termination of a whistleblower at the Police Security Service; in October, the agency of which she is chief asked the justice ministry if Bjørnland had a conflict of interest in the case. According to a later media report, she had a personal conflict with the whistleblower, Øyvind Tenold. As of 28 October, the justice ministry decided not make a decision in regard to the conflict of interest. Later in October, media revealed that the Police Directorate had been involved when Tenold was fired as leader of the Police Security Service at the West Police District (Vest politidistrikt). Tenold filed a complaint about his termination, which was overseen by the Police Directorate's central employment-council. However, it has been noted that the case work to decide on the complaint will be done by the Police Directorate itself, which has already been involved in the case of which the complaint comprises.

In August 2024, she announced that she wouldn't seek to be reappointed for a second term as director of police in 2025.

== Personal life ==
Bjørnland is married, has two children and resides in Sandefjord.

Police appointments
| Preceded by Roger Berg (acting) | Director of the Norwegian Police Security Service; 2012–2019 | Succeeded by Hans Sverre Sjøvold |
| Preceded by Odd Reidar Humlegård | Director of Police; 2019–present | Incumbent |
