= Mørkved =

Neighborhood in the town of Bodø, Norway

- Neighborhood in Bodø
- Interactive map of Mørkved
- Location within Nordland Location within Norway
- Coordinates: 67°17′19″N 14°33′53″E
- Country: Norway
- Region: Western Norway
- County: Nordland
- Municipality: Bodø Municipality
- Elevation: 75 m (246 ft)
- Time zone: UTC+01:00 (CET)
  - Summer (DST): UTC+02:00 (CEST)

Mørkved is a neighborhood of the town of Bodø in Bodø Municipality, Nordland county, Norway. It is located about 10 kilometers (6.2 mi) east of the town center. It is largely a residential area, but also is the site of Bodin Upper Secondary School, a campus of the Norwegian Police University College and the Bodø campus of the University of Nordland. The neighborhood lays along National Road 80. Mørkved Station on the Nordland Line opened in 1987 and was renovated in 2010.

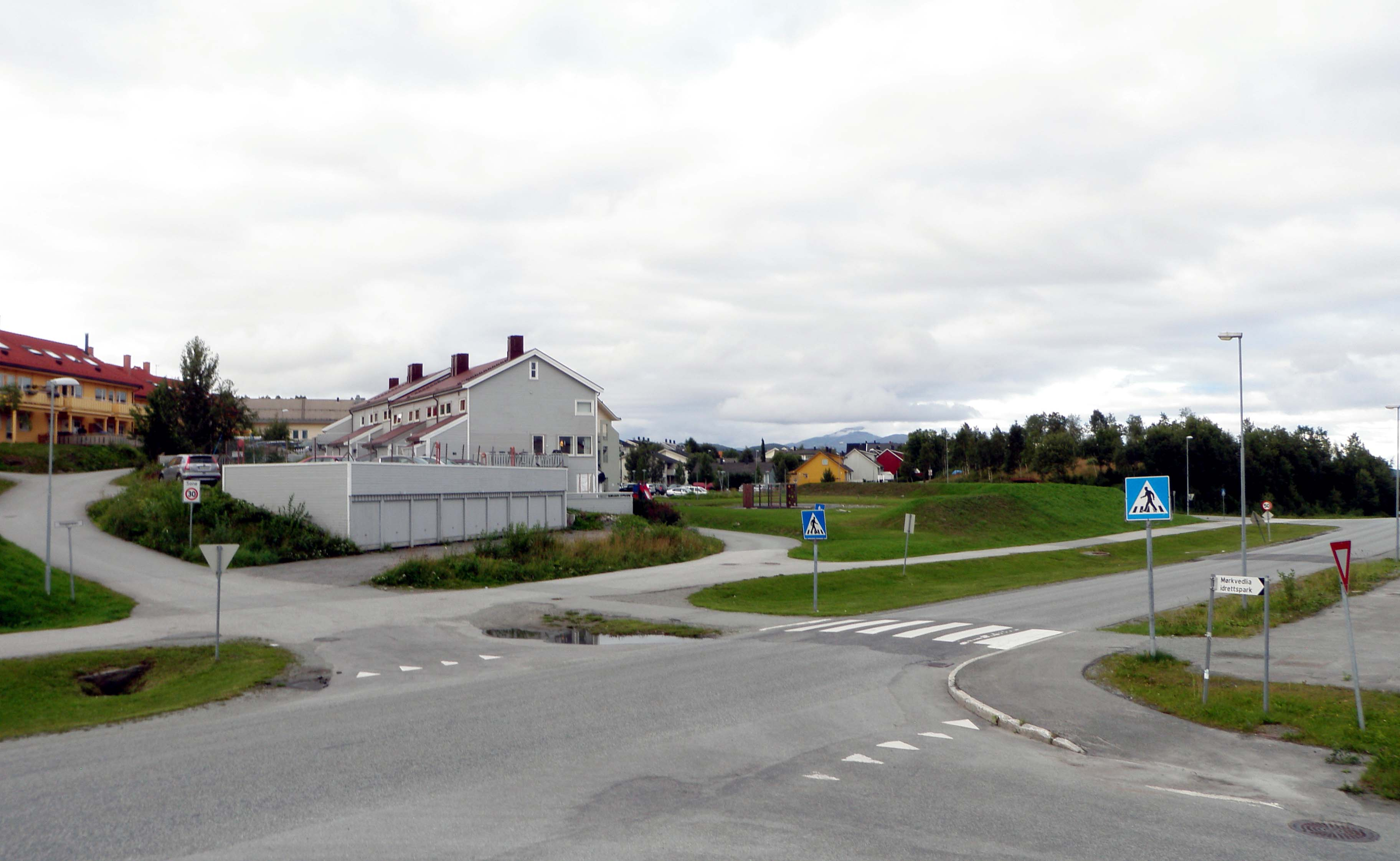
The street Mørkvedveien in Mørkved

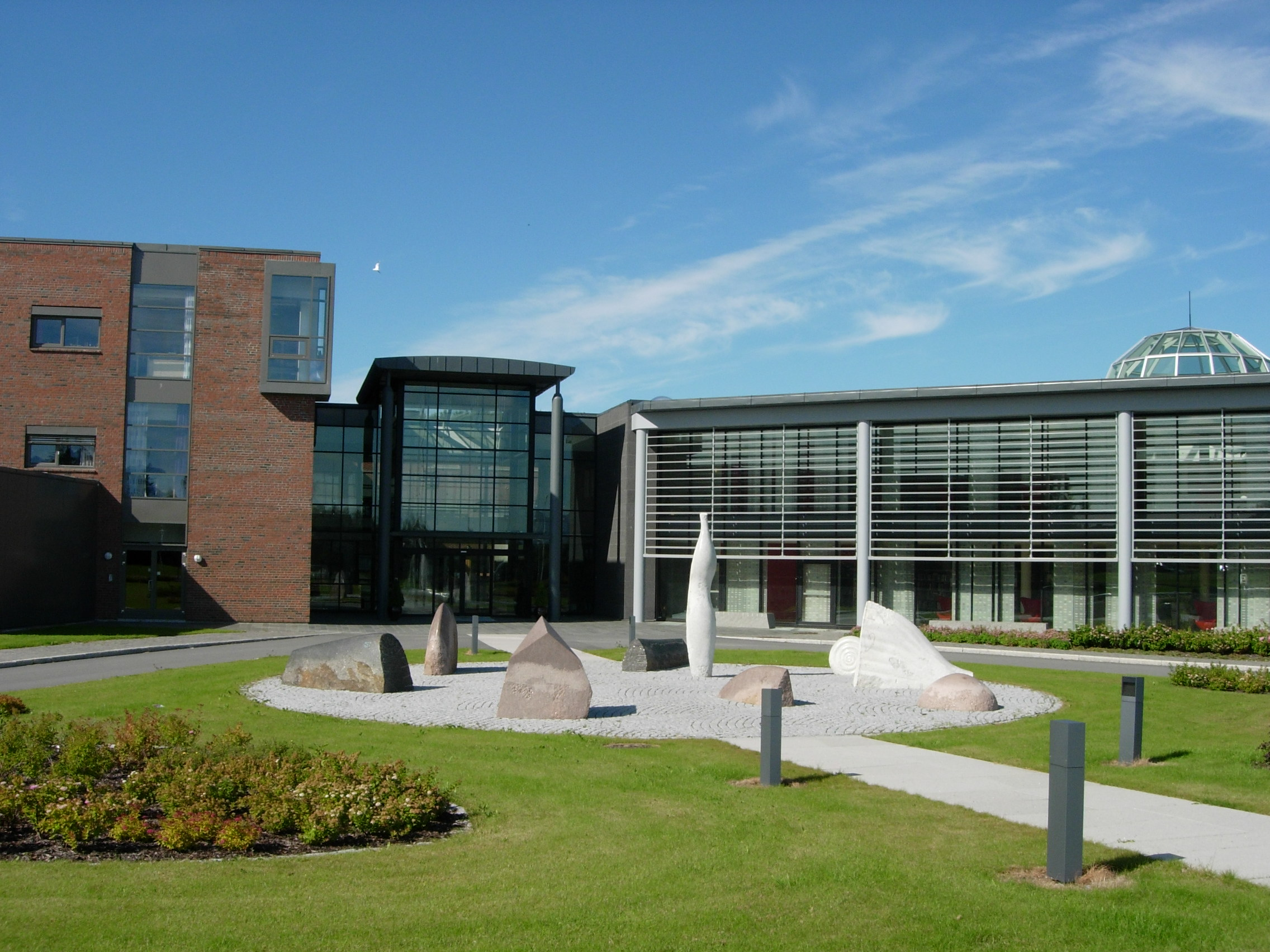
University of Nordland
