= Øivind Lunde =

- Born: 7 August 1962 (age 62); Bergen, Norway
- Genres: Jazz, blues
- Occupation: Musician
- Instrument: Bass

Øivind Lunde (born 7 August 1962 in Bergen, Norway) is a Norwegian bass guitarist, known from bands like Elle Melle, Good Time Charly and Electric Heavyland.

== Biography ==
Lunde started his musical career as a pupil at the Rudolf Steiner School in Bergen. He later started playing the bass guitar in local bands. His first major project was Good Time Charly. They performed at the 1988 URIJAZZ. At the 1993 Nattjazz he was in the lineup for Ole Thomsen's Electric Heavyland, and with Stein Hauge Band (2001–04).

Lunde was also in the backing band for the NRK TV show "Kvinner på randen" for years, also performing live in Norway.

== Discography ==
- 2000: Knuste Speil (Tylden & Co.)
