= Asbjørn Bryhn =

Norwegian police officer (1906–1990)

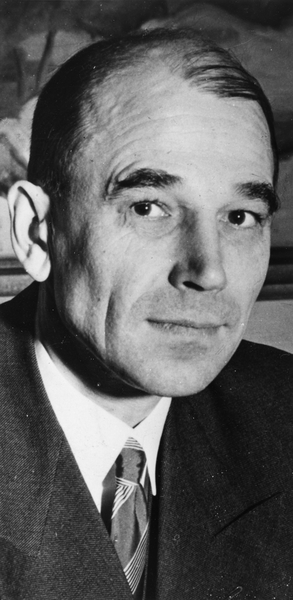
- Born: 24 August 1906; Drammen, Norway
- Died: 21 January 1990 (aged 83)
- Occupation: Police officer
- Known for: Head of the Norwegian Police Surveillance Agency

Asbjørn Johan Bryhn (24 August 1906 – 21 January 1990) was a Norwegian police officer, known for his resistance work during World War II, and later head of the Norwegian Police Surveillance Agency.

== Personal life ==
Bryhn was born in Drammen as the son of teacher Johannes Bryhn and teacher Inga Marie Helgesen. He married teacher Karen Sørensen in 1938. He died in Oslo in 1990.

== Career ==
Bryhn studied law at the Royal Frederick University from 1925, graduating in 1930. While being a student he was a member of the socialist and pacifist organization Clarté. From 1930 he worked in Svolvær for two years, and later with the police in Oslo. After the German occupation of Norway, Bryhn served as assistant of Chief of Police of Oslo Kristian Welhaven. When Welhaven was removed from his position, Bryhn and others started undercover intelligence work within the police corps. He was dismissed from the police in December 1941. From 1942 he became a leader of the police group of the undercover resistance group 2A, and cooperated closely with Asbjørn Sunde. He fled to Sweden, where he built up surveillance and security service at Norwegian legation in Stockholm. His main task was to control refugees and couriers from Norway, and he eventually became a controversial person at the legation.

He was assistant secretary (Norwegian: byråsjef) at the Ministry of Justice in the Norwegian exile government in London from 1943 to 1945. When the war ended in 1945 he became leader of the department which was responsible for the investigation of German criminals of war in Norway. From 1945 to 1957 he was a police inspector in Oslo. From 1957 to 1966 he was head of the Police Surveillance Agency (Norwegian: Politiets Overvåkningstjeneste, POT). After a controversy with leader of the Norwegian Intelligence Service Vilhelm Evang, when Bryhn arrested Evang's secretary and charged her for espionage for the Soviet Union, both Bryhn and Evang had to leave their positions. After Bryhn had left the service, Gunnar Haarstad became the next head of POT. Bryhn was Chief of Police of Bergen from 1967 to 1976.

== Biography ==
Andersen, Roy (1992). Sin egen fiende - et portrett av Asbjørn Bryhn (in Norwegian). Oslo: Cappelen. ISBN 82-02-12930-3.

Police appointments
Preceded by	Director of the Norwegian Police Surveillance Agency; 1956–1967	Succeeded by Gunnar Haarstad
Preceded by Erling Brinchmann	Chief of Police of Bergen; 1966–1976	Succeeded by Sigurd Müller
