= T5PC =

T5PC (or The 5 Percent Community) was a controversial Norwegian Multi-level marketing company that went bankrupt in November 2004.

As per November 2004, it had among 50,000 members (most papers claim 70,000, however) it is claimed that its members lost as much as 1 billion NOK ($160 million), thus making it one of the biggest economic frauds in Norwegian history.

An investigation was undertaken by Økokrim. Bankers complained that they had alerted Økokrim about problems with T5PC as early as summer 2003. In 2006 Økokrim indicted 4 people involved with T5PC for breach of trust with fraudulent intent.

It was founded by Aleksander Anderson who changed his name from Wolden to Anderson after going bankrupt in Norway.

Some of the main individuals responsible, including Henrik Ellefsen and Jørn Ronnie Tagge, were convicted on charges of fraud in December 2007.

== Trials of the main officers ==
=== Henrik Ellefsen ===
Henrik Andreas Leo Ellefsen (born 20 June 1971), now known under the name Henrik Onarheim, is a Norwegian businessman who was a major figure in the T5PC fraud and who received the longest prison sentence among the company's officers. In 2007, he was formally charged by Økokrim for his role as one of the people responsible for the T5PC fraud. On 21 December 2007, he was convicted on charges of fraud and sentenced to 3 years and 6 months in prison. He was also fined NOK 3,6 million (ca€. 500,000), and was barred from engaging in any form of trade for 5 years. The verdict was appealed on 22 January 2008. Borgarting Court of Appeal only accepted the appeal over the sentence, and in 2010 sentenced Ellefsen to 3 years and 6 months in prison, fined him 3,6 million NOK and sentenced him to loss of rights.

According to the verdict of Oslo District Court, Henrik Ellefsen played a central role in the T5PC system, as chairman of PWR Charge AS and CEO of Exente Securities ASA. The company PWR Charge AS was used to steal money from the T5PC members, according to the verdict.

His father, Harald Ellefsen, was acquitted in the same case. He was the owner of Exente Securities ASA, until he sold it to T5PC.

Henrik Ellefsen has written a book about the T5PC scandal, parts of which were presented in court as evidence, after the Økokrim found the manuscript during a raid. Ellefsen told the court that he wants to publish the book, to "explain to the members of T5PC what happened". The manuscript was entitled "T5PC til tross for bedre vitende - En sann historie om håp og grådighet" (T5PC in spite of better knowledge - A true story of hope and greed").

Ellefsen later founded LXCCoin Ltd., which purported to develop a crypto currency, and which is now known as Nxchain. LXCCoin and Nxchain have also been the subjects of controversies.

=== Jørn Ronnie Tagge ===
Jørn Ronnie Tagge (born 2 June 1969) is a Norwegian convicted fraudster, also convicted as part of the T5PC fraud. He served as chairman of the T5PC. Tagge has been criminally convicted three times:

1. In February 2006 he was sentenced to five months in prison.
2. In 2007, he was convicted on charges of fraud relating to his role in the T5PC system, and sentenced to 2 years in prison. He was also fined 770,000 NOK, and he also was barred from engaging in any form of trade for 5 years.
3. In October 2008 he was additionally sentenced to one year in prison, for manipulating the value of stock. He was fined further 72 000 NOK.
