= National Authority for Investigation and Prosecution of Economic and Environmental Crime in Norway =

Norwegian government agency

Økokrims logo

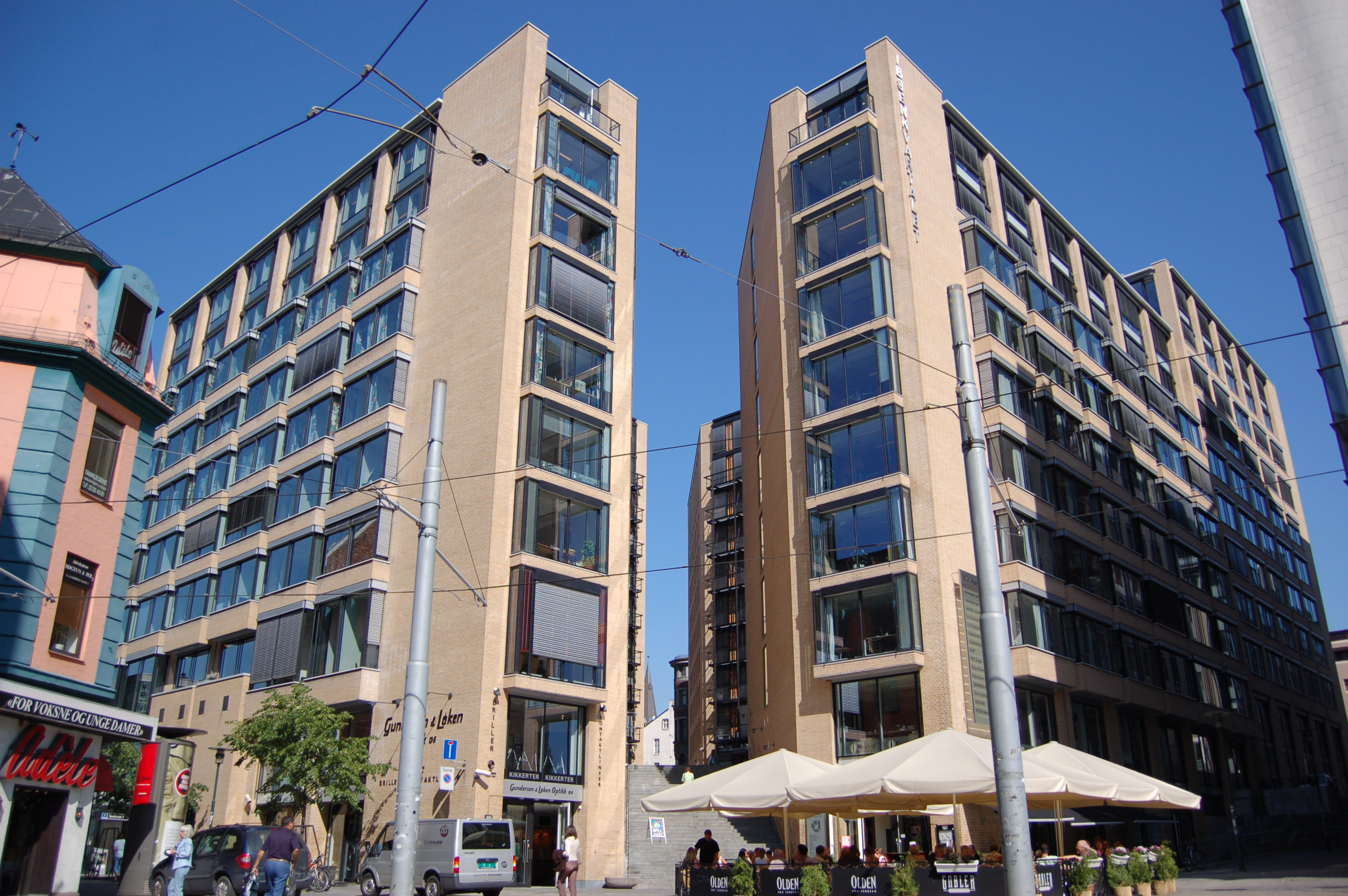
The headquarters in Oslo, C. J. Hambros plass 2

The National Authority for Investigation and Prosecution of Economic and Environmental Crime (Norwegian: Økokrim) is Norway's central unit for fighting economic and environmental crimes. The unit, created in 1989, has its main office in Oslo.

Økokrim is both a police unit and a prosecution authority. The current director is Pål Lønseth. The unit is organized in multidisciplinary teams headed by public prosecutors. Each team has a specific field of expertise, such as corruption, computer crime or fraud.

== Cases ==
The organization has played an important role in some major legal cases. In 2003, Økokrim arrested Mullah Krekar, alleged leader of the Kurdish Islamist group, Ansar al-Islam.

=== 2002 ===
After Jon Lech Johansen released DeCSS, he was taken to court by Økokrim. The trial opened in the Oslo District Court on 9 December 2002 with Johansen pleading not guilty and the defense, by Electronic Frontier Foundation argued that no illegal access was obtained to anyone else's information, since Johansen owned the DVDs himself. They also argued that it is legal under Norwegian law to make copies of such data for personal use. The verdict was announced on 7 January 2003, acquitting Johansen of all charges.

=== 2003 ===
Økokrim filed an appeal on 20 January 2003 to the Johansen verdict and on 28 February that the Borgarting Court of Appeal had agreed to hear the case. Johansen's second DeCSS trial began on 2 December 2003, and resulted in an acquittal on 22 December 2003. Økokrim did make a further appeal of the case to the Supreme Court.

=== 2006 ===
In 2006, Økokrim filed indictments were filed against four members of The 5 Percent Community for breach of trust with fraudulent intent. The main individuals responsible, including Henrik Ellefsen and Jørn Ronnie Tagge, were convicted on charges of fraud in December 2007.

=== 2011 ===
In 2011 the agency investigated 28 cases. 28 persons were convicted, and the conviction rate was 86%.

=== 2012 ===
The agency's desired conviction rate is 90%.

=== 2016 ===
On 8 March 2016, Økokrim seized the Popcorn-Time.no domain name. The site did not host the Popcorn Time application but instead had articles and links to sites that offered the application.

== See also ==
- National Police Directorate
- Police Security Agency
