= Norwegian Police University College =

Norwegian public university college

- Politihøgskolen (Norwegian)
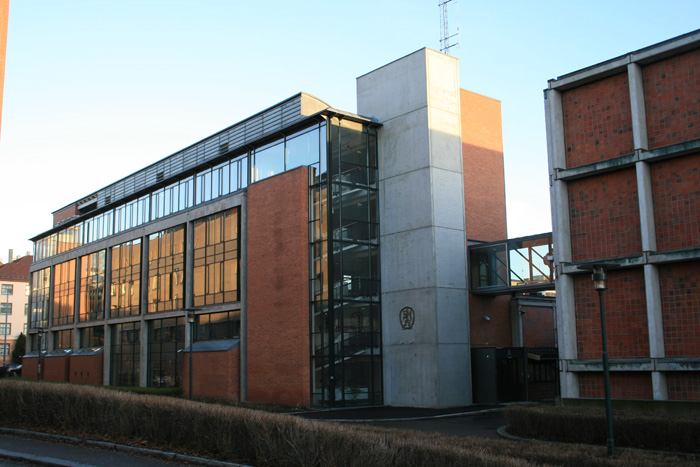
- View of the Oslo campus
- Type: State university college
- Established: 1992; 34 years ago
- Rector: Håkon Skulstad
- Location: Bodø, Kongsvinger, Oslo and Stavern, Norway; 59°55′53″N 10°42′50″E
- Website: www.phs.no

The Norwegian Police University College (Norwegian: Politihøgskolen; PHS) is a public university college located in Oslo, Kongsvinger, Stavern and Bodø, Norway. It offers education for the police force of Norway, including a three-year basic education and four Master's degrees. 552 students were accepted at the Bachelor level in 2019 from 4,063 applicants. The university college also conducts research in relevant areas including law, police science, criminology, psychology and sociology. It is owned by the Norwegian Ministry of Justice and the Police.

== History ==
The school dates back to the organized education of the police force in Oslo in 1889, but was created as a separate school in 1920. It was called The State Police School and had the status of etatsskole (agency school) until 1992, when it was organized as a university college (høgskole). The campus at Mørkved in Bodø supplemented the one at Majorstuen in Oslo in 1997. It received a full accreditation as a university college in 2004 (from 1992 to 2004, it only had accreditation for its programmes, not a full institutional accreditation).
