= Norwegian Police Security Service =

Domestic intelligence service in Norway

Norwegian Police Security Service Politiets sikkerhetstjeneste
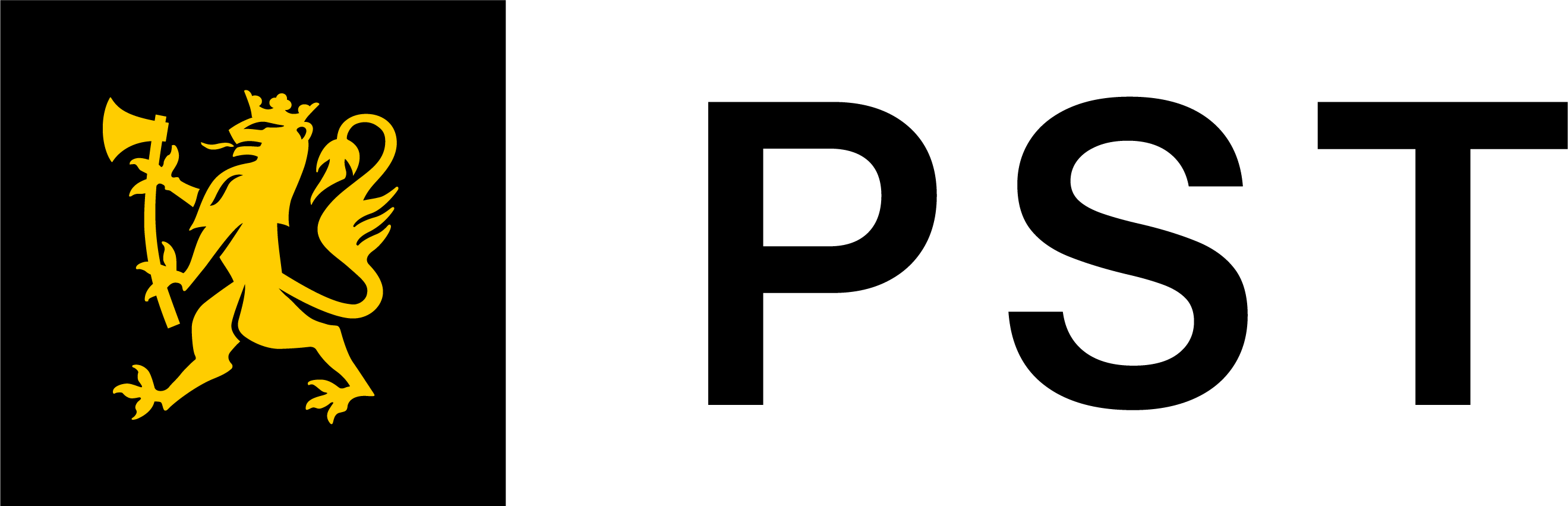
- PST Emblem
- Abbreviation: PST

Agency overview
- Formed: 1937

Jurisdictional structure
- Operations jurisdiction: Norway
- General nature: Civilian police
- Specialist jurisdiction: Protection of international or domestic VIPs, protection of significant state assets

Operational structure
- Headquarters: Oslo
- Agency executive: Beate Gangås, Director
- Parent agency: Ministry of Justice and Public Security

Website
- pst.no

The Norwegian Police Security Service (Bokmål: Politiets sikkerhetstjeneste; PST, Nynorsk: Politiets tryggingsteneste; PTT) is the police security agency of Norway. The agency was previously known as Politiets overvåkningstjeneste, POT; lit. 'Police Surveillance Agency'), the name change was decided by the Parliament of Norway on 2 June 2001.

== History and organization ==
The service was established in 1937 by direction of the Ministry of Justice led by Trygve Lie. It is responsible for monitoring and maintaining interior security in Norway. Known operational departments include counterintelligence unit, counterterrorism unit, counterproliferation and organized crime unit, counterextremism unit, investigation unit, surveillance unit, technology unit, security analysis unit and foreign citizens unit. In addition, PST is in charge of all VIP protection domestically and abroad except for the royal family, which has its own independent escort service.

PST is, unlike all ordinary police services, not subordinated to the National Police Directorate, but placed directly under the Ministry of Justice and Public Security. The agency is monitored by the Norwegian Parliamentary Intelligence Oversight Committee, after the debates concerning the Lund Report.

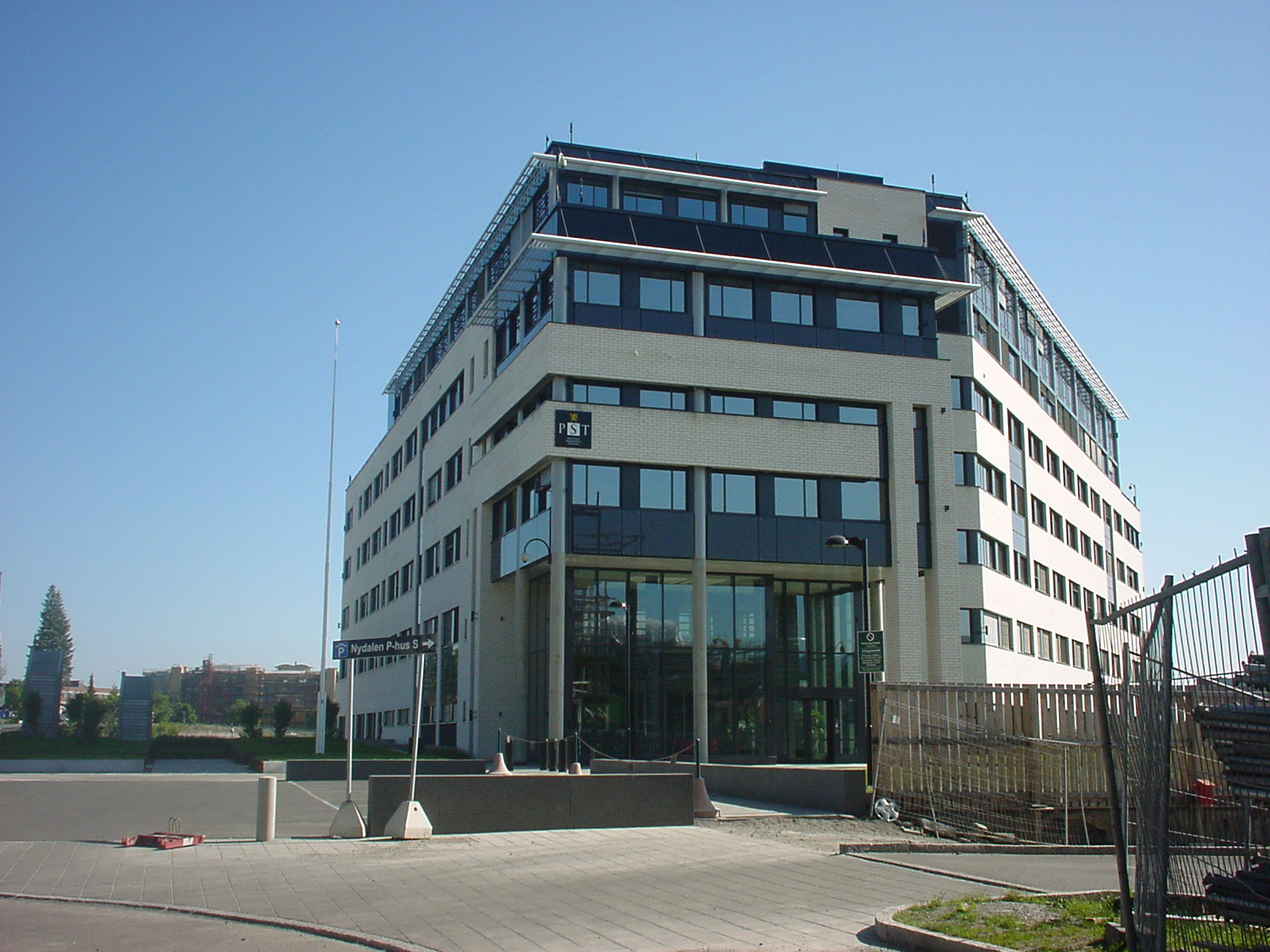
PST headquarters.

The organization consists of Den sentrale enhet (central unit) which is located in Nydalen, Oslo, as well as regional offices in all the police regions.

== Directors ==
This is a list of the directors of the agency.

- 1957–1966 : Asbjørn Bryhn
- 1967–1982 : Gunnar Haarstad
- 1982–1990 : Jostein Erstad
- 1990–1991 : Svein Urdal
- 1991–1993 : Jan Grøndahl (acting)
- 1993–1996 : Hans Olav Østgaard
- 1996–1997 : Ellen Holager Andenæs (acting)
- 1997–2003 : Per Sefland
- 2003–2004 : Arnstein Øverkil (acting)
- 2004–2009 : Jørn Holme
- 2009 : Roger Berg (acting)
- 2009–2012 : Janne Kristiansen
- 2012 : Roger Berg (acting)
- 2012–2019 : Marie Benedicte Bjørnland
- 2019–2022: Hans Sverre Sjøvold
- 2022- : Beate Gangås
