= National Police Directorate (Norway) =

Coordinates: 59°54′54.29″N 10°45′3.20″E

National Police Directorate Politidirektoratet
- Coat of arms of the Norwegian Police

Agency overview
- Formed: 2002

Jurisdictional structure
- Operations jurisdiction: Norway
- General nature: Civilian police

Operational structure
- Headquarters: Hammersborggt. 12, Oslo
- Agency executives: Odd Reidar Humlegård, National Police Commissioner and head of the police in Norway; Vidar Refvik, Assistant National Commissioner
- Parent agency: Ministry of Justice and Public Security

Website
- https://www.politi.no/politidirektoratet/

National Police Directorate (Norwegian: Politidirektoratet) is a government agency subordinate to the Ministry of Justice and Public Security which heads the Norwegian Police Service. The directorate is led by the National Police Commissioner (Politidirektør), who since 2012 has been Odd Reidar Humlegård.

In Norway there is only one police force. The organisation of the Norwegian Police is largely based on the principle of an integrated police, that is that all the functions of the police are collected in one organisation.

== See also ==
- Task Force for Economical and Fraud crimes
- Police Security Service
