= Norwegian of the Year (Ny Tid) =

Norwegian of the Year (Norwegian: Årets nordmann) is a distinction awarded by the leftist news magazine Ny Tid (lit. 'New Age'). Established in 2007, the prize has been awarded to several persons, including Norwegian citizens of foreign origin and a German citizen living in Norway.

== History ==
Following a public debate on the definition of the term Norwegian (a demonym; Norwegian: nordmann, lit. 'Northman') more specifically whether Norwegian citizens of foreign origin should be called nordmann or—considered as more neutral—norsk (an adjective; English: Norwegian), the magazine instituted the distinction Årets nordmann, i.e. 'Norwegian of the Year', in 2007. The first recipient was actress Kohinoor Nordberg, originally from Bangladesh.

== List of recipients ==
Year	Image	Name	Year and country of birth	Occupation	Reason
2007		Kohinoor Nordberg	1973, Bangladesh	actress	
2008		Margreth Olin	1970, Norway	film director	
2009		Randi Hagen Spydevold	1952, Norway	candidata juris	
2010		Madina Salamova	1985, North Ossetia	journalist	Illegal immigrant.
2011		Prableen Kaur	1993, Norway (Indian origin)	student	Utøya survivor.
"		Marcel Gleffe	1979, Germany (residing in Norway)	ex-military	Utøya hero.
"		Synnøve Kvamme	1991, Norway	activist	Nature activism.
2012		Bjønnulv Evenrud	1970, Norway	activist	Defender of Romas' rights and dignity.
2013		Neda Ibrahim	2001, Middle East	minor	Deported child of dito illegal immigrants. Considered a 'face of all refugee children'.
