= 2011 Norway attacks =

Domestic terrorist attacks

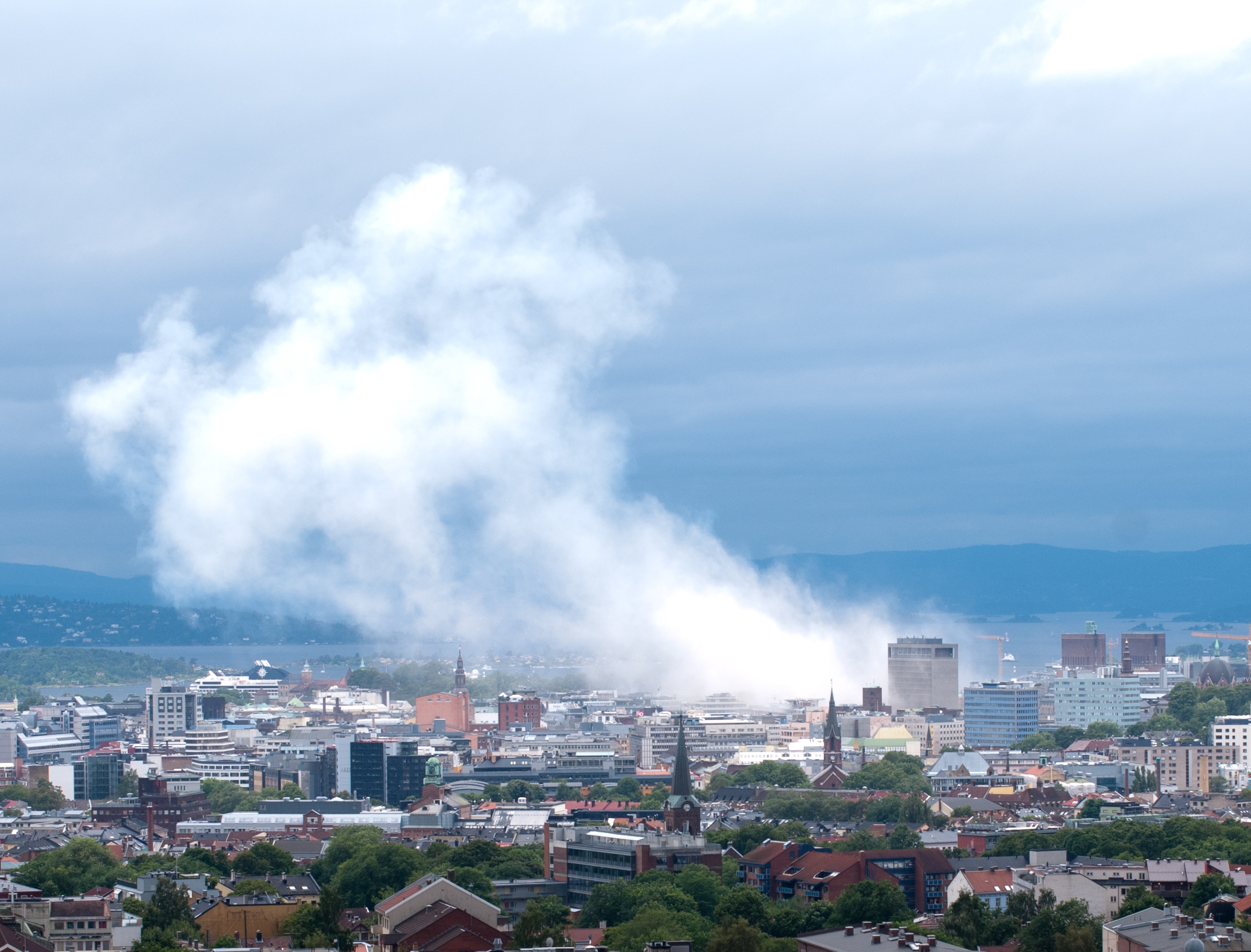
- 33 minutes after the explosion in Oslo

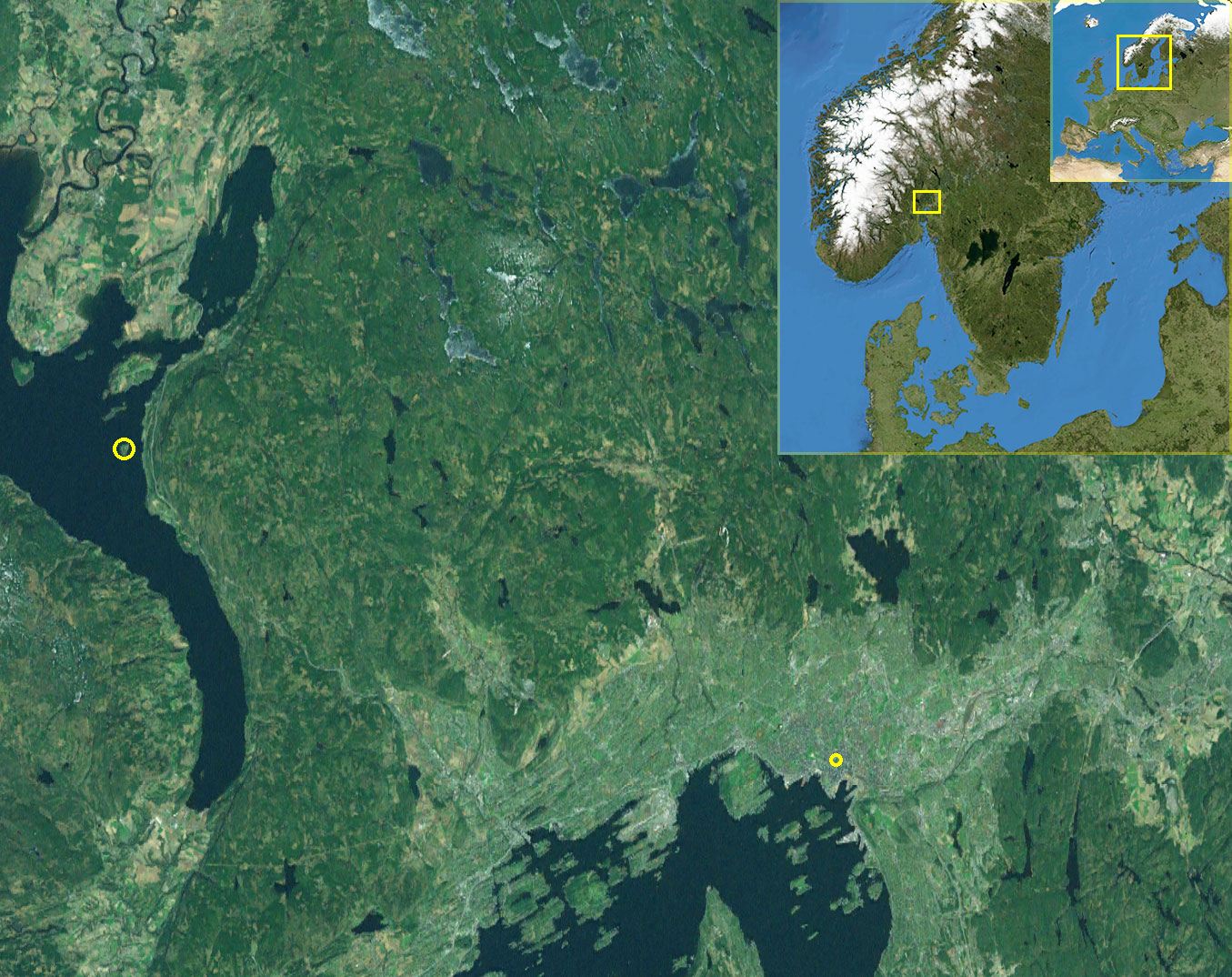
- Locations of the attacks in the Oslo and Buskerud counties of Norway
- Location: 59.915184°N 10.746015°E (Regjeringkvartalet); 60.023288°N 10.247704°E (Utøya island); Oslo and Utøya, Norway
- Date: 22 July 2011; 15 years ago: Oslo bombing: 15:25 CEST; Utøya island shooting: 17:22–18:34 CEST; (UTC+02:00)
- Target: Labour Party members
- Attack type: Car bombing; mass shooting; mass murder; domestic terrorism; right-wing terrorism
- Weapons: Oslo: ANFO van bomb Utøya: .223 caliber Ruger Mini-14 semi-automatic rifle; 9mm Glock 34 semi-automatic pistol; 12-gauge Benelli Nova pump-action shotgun (sawed-off; unused); Bayonet (unused); Knife (unused)
- Deaths: 77 (8 by bombing, 67 by gunfire, 2 indirectly)
- Injuries: 323+ (210+ by bombing, 33 by gunfire, 80+ indirectly)
- Perpetrator: Anders Behring Breivik
- Motive: Far-right terrorism; White supremacy; Islamophobia; Anti-immigration; Belief in white genocide, Cultural Marxism, and Eurabia conspiracy theories; Retaliation for NATO bombing of Yugoslavia
- Verdict: Legally sane and guilty on both counts
- Convictions: Count I (Oslo bombing): Aggravated premeditated murder (8 counts); Attempted murder (9 counts); Terrorism; Causing a dangerous explosion; Count II (Utøya island shooting): Aggravated premeditated murder (69 counts); Attempted murder (33 counts); Terrorism
- Sentence: 21 years preventive detention with the possibility of indefinite extension

On 22 July 2011, 32-year-old far-right extremist Anders Behring Breivik committed two domestic terrorist attacks in Norway against the government, the civilian population, and a Workers' Youth League (AUF) summer camp, in which a total of 77 people were killed.

The first attack was a car bomb explosion in Oslo within Regjeringskvartalet, the executive government quarter of Norway, at 15:25:22 (CEST). The bomb was placed inside a Volkswagen Crafter van next to the tower block housing the office of the then prime minister Jens Stoltenberg. The explosion killed 8 people and injured at least 210 people, 12 severely.

The second attack occurred less than two hours later at a summer camp on the island of Utøya in Tyrifjorden, Buskerud. The camp was organised by the AUF, the youth wing of the ruling Norwegian Labour Party (Ap). Breivik, dressed in a homemade police uniform and showing false identification, arrived at the island claiming to be performing a routine check following the bombing. His presence raised the suspicions of the camp's organizer and subsequently a security guard, prompting Breivik to kill them both. He then opened fire at the participants, killing 69 and injuring 33. Among the dead were friends of Stoltenberg, and the stepbrother of Norway's Queen Mette-Marit.

The attack was the deadliest in Norway since World War II. A survey found that one in four Norwegians knew someone affected. The European Union, NATO and several countries expressed their support for Norway and condemned the attacks. The 2012 Gjørv Report concluded that Norway's police could have prevented the bombing and caught Breivik faster at Utøya, and that measures to prevent further attacks and "mitigate adverse effects" should have been implemented.

The Norwegian Police arrested Breivik on Utøya island and charged him with both attacks. His trial took place between 16 April and 22 June 2012 in Oslo District Court, where Breivik admitted carrying out the attacks, but denied criminal guilt and claimed the defence of necessity (jus necessitatis). On 24 August, Breivik was convicted as charged and sentenced to 21 years of preventive detention in prison with the possibility of indefinite five-year extensions for public safety, the maximum sentence allowed in Norway.

== Preparation for the attacks ==
Breivik was preparing for the attacks at least as early as 2009, though he concealed his violent intentions.

=== Failed attempt to buy weapons in Prague ===
Breivik spent six days in Prague in late August and early September 2010. Following his Internet inquiry, Breivik noted that "Prague is known for maybe being the most important transit site point for illicit drugs and weapons in Europe". Despite Prague having one of the lowest crime rates among European capitals, Breivik expressed reservations about his personal safety, writing that (before his trip there) he believed Prague to be a dangerous place with "many brutal and cynical criminals".

He hollowed out the rear seats of his Hyundai Atos in order to have enough space for the firearms he hoped to buy. After two days, he got a prospectus for a mineral extraction business printed, which was supposed to give him an alibi in case someone suspected him of preparing a terrorist attack. He wanted to buy an AK-47-type assault rifle, a Glock pistol, hand-grenades and a rocket-propelled grenade, stating that getting the latter two would be a "bonus".

Breivik had several fake police badges printed to wear with a police uniform, which he had acquired illegally on the Internet, and which he later wore during the attack. Contrary to his expectations, he was unable to get any firearms in the Czech Republic, commenting that it was the "first major setback in [his] operation". In the end, he concluded that Prague was "far from an ideal city to buy guns", nothing like "what the BBC reported", and that he had felt "safer in Prague than in Oslo".

=== Arming in Norway and through the Internet ===
Originally, Breivik intended to try to obtain weapons in Germany or Serbia if his mission in Prague failed. The Czech disappointment led him to procure his weapons through legal channels. He decided to obtain a semi-automatic rifle and a Glock pistol legally in Norway, noting that he had a "clean criminal record, hunting license, and two guns (a Benelli Nova 12 gauge pump-action shotgun and a Weatherby Vanguard .308 bolt-action rifle) already for seven years", and that obtaining the guns legally should therefore not be a problem.

Upon returning to Norway, Breivik originally wanted to purchase a 7.62×39mm Ruger Mini-30 semi-automatic carbine, because it fires the intermediate cartridge, identical to the calibre used by the AK-47 rifle. However, he encountered a strict legal and administrative hurdle: he already owned a .308 calibre bolt-action rifle. In his writing, he showed a fundamental misunderstanding of firearms ballistics, mistakenly believing that the 7.62×39mm and .308 cartridges had identical calibres and because Norwegian gun laws required strict justification for owning multiple firearms of the same calibre, he panicked. He feared that applying for a Ruger Mini-30 would look redundant on his paperwork. He worried that meticulous police clerks would spot the overlapping "caliber" sizes, reject his application, and subject him to a deeper background investigation that could unravel his entire plot. To guarantee his application sailed through without raising red flags, Breivik obtained a legal permit for a .223-calibre Ruger Mini-14 semi-automatic carbine, ostensibly for the purpose of hunting deer. He bought it in late 2010 for €1,400. Despite losing his initial calibre preference, Breivik was satisfied with the pivot. He noted in his manifesto that the semi-automatic Mini-14 was the most "army-like" legal rifle he could successfully obtain under Norway's strict civilian firearm laws.

Getting a permit for the pistol proved more difficult, as he had to demonstrate regular attendance at a sport shooting club. He also bought 10 30-round magazines for the rifle from a United States supplier, and six magazines for the pistol (including four 30-round magazines) in Norway. From November 2010 to January 2011 he went through 15 training sessions at the Oslo Pistol Club, and by mid-January his application to purchase a Glock pistol was approved.

Breivik claimed in his manifesto that he bought 300 g of sodium nitrate from a Polish shop for €10. The Polish ABW interviewed the company owner on 24 July 2011. Breivik's Polish purchases initially led to him being placed on the watch list of the Norwegian intelligence, which did not act because they did not believe his actions were relevant to their terror concerns.

He had also planned a last religious service (in Frogner Church, Oslo) before the attack.

==== Breivik Geofarm ====
On 18 May 2009, Breivik created a sole proprietorship called Breivik Geofarm, a company established under the fictitious purpose of cultivating vegetables, melons, roots and tubers. The real purpose was to gain access to chemicals and materials, especially fertiliser that could be used for the production of explosives without arousing suspicion.

The place of business was given as Åmot Municipality in Hedmark. On 4 May 2011, Breivik purchased 6 tonnes (13,000 lb) of fertiliser through Geofarm at Felleskjøpet, 3 tonnes (6,600 lb) of ammonium nitrate and 3 tonnes (6,600 lb) of calcium ammonium nitrate. According to neighbours, all the fertiliser was stored in his barn. After conducting a reconstruction of the bomb with equivalent amount of fertiliser on the farm in Åmot, police and bomb experts concluded that the bomb had been 950 kg (2,090 lb), about the same size as the one used in the 2002 Bali bombings. Afterwards there was significant debate in Norway about how an amateur could acquire such substantial amounts of fertiliser and manufacture and place such a lethal weapon in the middle of Regjeringskvartalet all by himself. The conclusion by Felleskjøpet was that there is no legislation to keep agricultural businesses from buying as much fertiliser as they like, and that there was nothing suspicious about Breivik's purchase. This was confirmed by the director of the Norwegian Police Security Service, Janne Kristiansen, who stated "not even the Stasi could have prevented this attack".

The company listed at least two Swedish employees on the social networking site Facebook, but it is uncertain whether these people existed.

In April 2011, he reported moving from Oslo to Vålstua farm in the municipality of Åmot, about 9 kilometres (6 mi) south of the community centre Rena, on the east side of Glomma. His agricultural company was run from the farm, and gave him access to ingredients for explosives.

His 950-kilogram (2,090 lb) car bomb exploded in central Oslo on 22 July 2011, where it killed eight people. He had between 1,000 and 1,500 kilograms (2,200 and 3,300 lb) of additional material that was left on the farm and could be used for construction of a second bomb.

=== Weapons training ===
Beside visiting firing ranges and countries with relaxed gun laws to sharpen his skill, Breivik's manifesto says that he made use of the video game Call of Duty: Modern Warfare 2 as a training aid while using World of Warcraft as a cover for his extended period of isolation. He also said that he honed his shooting skills using an in-game holographic sight similar to the one he used during the attacks.

== Oslo car bombing ==
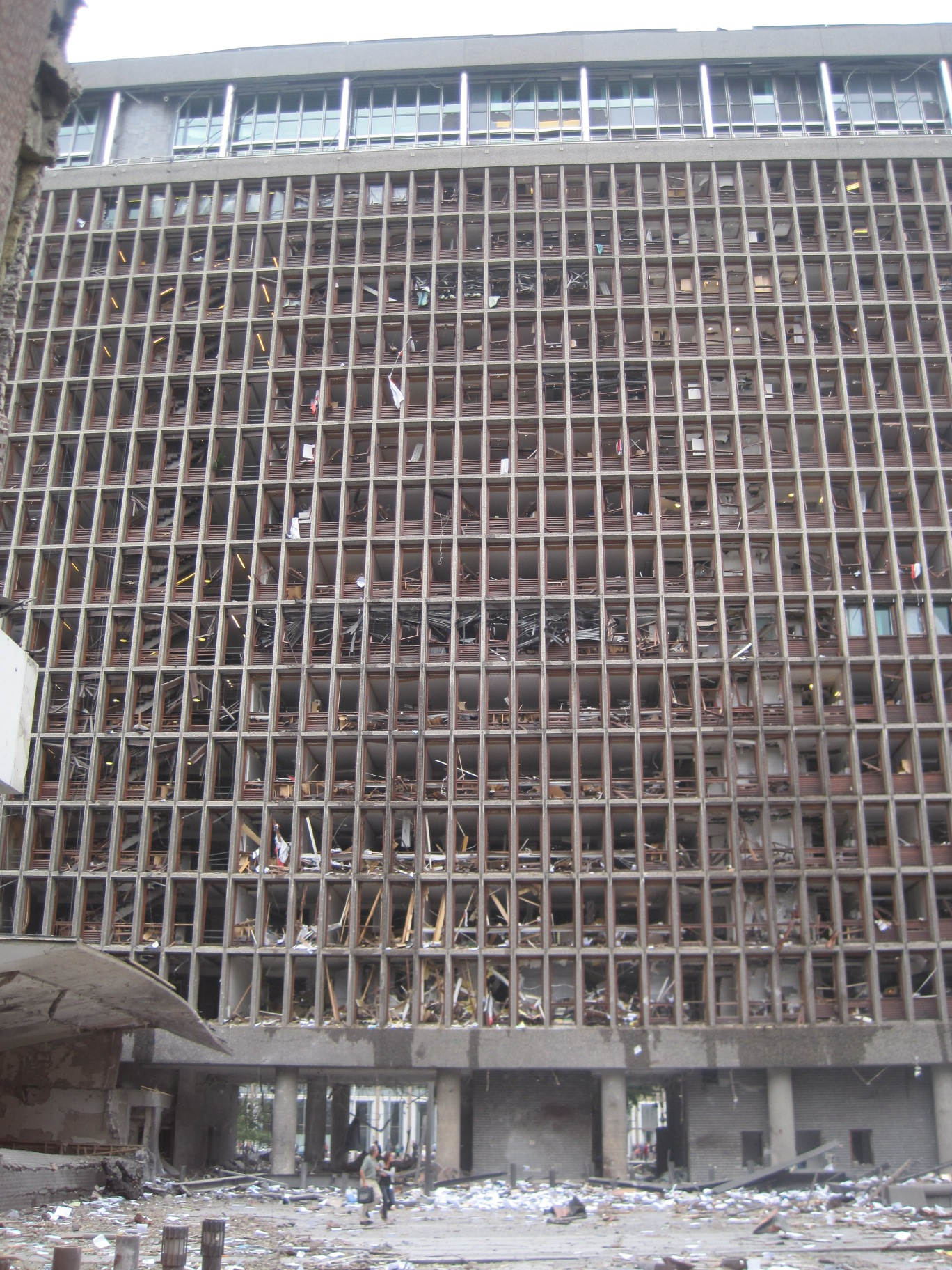
The building housing the Office of the Prime Minister and Ministry of Justice and the Police with blown-out windows shortly after the explosion. The bomb van had been placed behind the people shown.

A graphical illustration of the placement of the car bomb in Regjeringskvartalet. The office of the Prime Minister was in Block H.

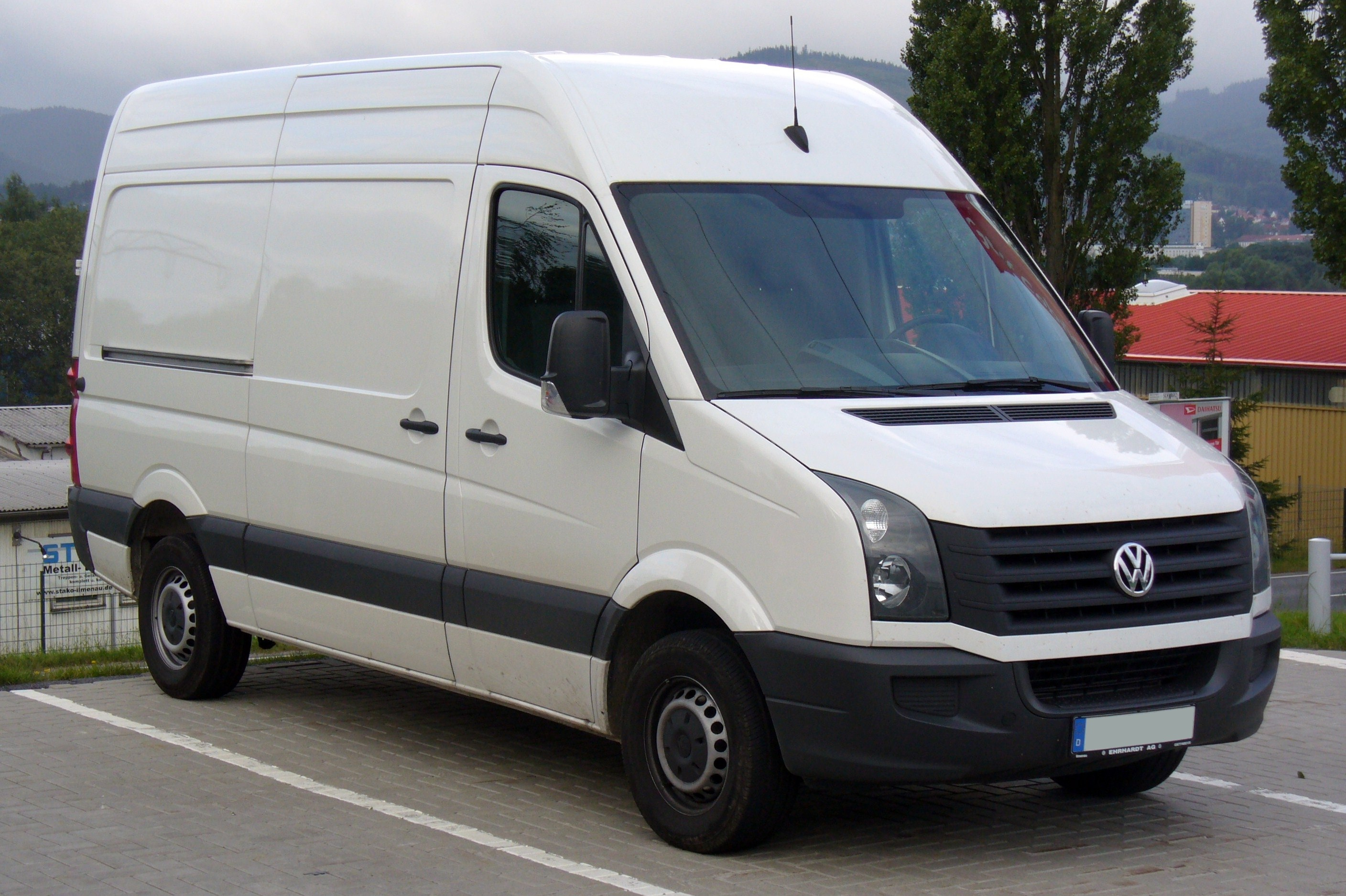
A white Volkswagen Crafter van similar to the one Breivik planted the bomb in

On 22 July 2011, at 15:25:22 (CEST) a bomb detonated in Regjeringskvartalet, central Oslo. The bomb was placed in a white Volkswagen Crafter and parked in front of the H block, housing the Office of the Prime Minister, Ministry of Justice and the Police, and several other governmental buildings, such as the Ministry of Petroleum and Energy (R4), Ministry of Finance (G block), Ministry of Education and Research (Y block) and the Supreme Court of Norway (behind the G block).

The Crafter was registered by surveillance cameras as entering Grubbegata from Grensen at 15:13:23. The van stopped at 15:13:43, 200 metres (650 ft) before the H block. It stood still with the hazard warning lamps on for 1 minute and 54 seconds. The driver then drove the last 200 metres and parked the van in front of the main entrance of the main government building. The van was parked at 15:16:30. The front door of the van opened 16 seconds later and after another 16 seconds the driver stepped out of the van. He stood outside the van for 7 seconds before quickly walking away towards Hammersborg torg, where he had another car parked.

The driver was dressed like a police officer and had a gun in his hand. A police helmet with a face shield was covering his face. Breivik was not positively identified.

The explosion started fires in the H block (H-blokka) and R4, and the shock wave blew out the windows on all floors as well as in the VG house and other buildings on the other side of the square. The blast was caught on many security cameras. The streets in the area were filled with glass and debris. A cloud of white smoke which was reported as a fire continued to burn at the Department of Oil and Energy. The blast was heard at least nine kilometres (5 1/2 mi) away.

At 15:26 the police received the first message about the explosion. 90 seconds after the explosion was reported, Norway's leading national private radio station P4 went live from the government quarters, becoming the first media in the world to report live (on air) from the area of explosion. At 15:28 the first police patrol reported arriving at the scene. At the same time, news agency NTB was told that the Prime Minister was safe and not hurt.

A witness called police at 15:34 to report a person in a police uniform holding a pistol in his hand, entering an unmarked vehicle, a Fiat Doblò. Information—including the vehicle's licence plate number and description of the suspect—was written on a yellow note, and hand-delivered to the police operations central where it lay for 20 minutes before the witness was phoned back. The licence plate number was not transmitted on the police radio until two hours later.

Following the explosion, police cleared the area and searched for any additional explosive devices. Through media outlets, police urged citizens to evacuate central Oslo.

Police later announced that the bomb was composed of a mixture of fertiliser and fuel oil (ANFO), similar to that used in the Oklahoma City bombing.

=== Effect on transport ===
Immediately after the explosion, the area surrounding the damaged buildings was cordoned off and evacuated. People were asked to remain calm and leave the city centre if possible, but there was no general evacuation. The Oslo Metro remained operational, and most of the Oslo tram network was also running, although sporadically, except for the line through Grensen (the street between Prof. Aschehoug's plass and Stortorvet).

An e-mail communication with the BBC from a traveller indicated that police were conducting searches of suspicious cars on the road to Oslo Airport, Gardermoen, which remained open.

The Gardermoen Line between Lillestrøm and Oslo Airport was shut down after a suspicious package was found close to the tracks. The same happened at the offices of TV 2 which were evacuated after a suspicious package was found outside the building.

== Utøya mass shooting ==
Approximately one and a half hours after the Oslo explosion, Breivik, dressed in a police uniform and presenting himself as "Martin Nilsen" from the Oslo Police Department, boarded the ferry MS Thorbjørn at Utøykaia in Tyrifjorden, a lake some 32 kilometres (20 mi) northwest of Oslo, to the island of Utøya, the location of the Norwegian Labour Party's AUF youth camp. The camp is held there every summer and was attended by approximately 600 teenagers.

When Breivik arrived on the island, he presented himself as a police officer who had come over for a routine check following the bombing in Oslo. He was met by Monica Bøsei, the camp leader and island hostess. Bøsei probably became suspicious and contacted Trond Berntsen, the security officer on the island, before Breivik killed them both. He then signalled and asked people to gather around him before pulling weapons and ammunition from a bag and firing indiscriminately, killing and wounding numerous people. He first shot people on the island and later started shooting at people who were trying to escape by swimming across the lake. Survivors on the island described a scene of terror. Survivor Dana Barzingi, then 21, described how several victims wounded by Breivik pretended to be dead, but he came back and shot them again. He spared an 11-year-old boy who had lost his father (Trond Berntsen) during the shooting and stood up against him and said he was too young to die, as well as a 22-year-old man who begged for his life.

Some witnesses hid in undergrowth and lavatories, communicating by text message to avoid revealing their positions. The mass shooting lasted for around one and a half hours, ending when a police special task force arrived and Breivik surrendered, despite having ammunition left, at 18:35. The shooter used hollow-point or frangible bullets which increase tissue damage. Breivik repeatedly shouted "You will die today, Marxists!"

Bøsei's husband and one of her daughters, who were also present, survived. The youngest victim, New Zealand-born Sharidyn Svebakk-Bøhn of Drammen, was 14 years old. Sixteen-year-old Andrine Bakkene Espeland of Sarpsborg was the last victim, nearly one hour after the shooting began.

Residents in a flotilla of motorboats and fishing dinghies sailed out to rescue the survivors, who were pulled out shivering and bleeding from the water and picked up from hiding places in the bushes and behind rocks around the island's shoreline. Some survived by pretending to be dead. Several campers, especially those who knew the island well, swam to the island's rocky west side and hid in the caves which are only accessible from the water. Others were able to hide away on the secluded Kjærlighetsstien ("love path"). Forty-seven of the campers sought refuge in Skolestua ("the School House") together with personnel from the Norwegian People's Aid. Although Breivik fired two bullets through the door, he did not get through the locked door, and the people inside this building survived.

Two Chechen teenagers, Movsar Dzhamayev (17) and Rustam Daudov (16) had pelted the gunman with rocks in an attempt to stop him. The teenagers said they then decided that it was too difficult to stop the gunman and better to save lives. They discovered a cave-like opening in a rock where they hid 23 children from Breivik. Dzhamayev, who kept guard outside, also dragged three youngsters from the lake who were close to drowning.

Former prime minister Gro Harlem Brundtland, whom Breivik said he hated and, in a pun on the (more or less ironic) epithet Landsmoderen ("mother of the nation"), referred to in his writings as landsmorderen ("murderer of the nation"), had been on the island earlier in the day to give a speech to the camp. After the attack, Breivik stated that he originally wanted to target her specifically; but because of delays related to the renovation of Oslo Central railway station, he arrived after she had already left.

Investigators later confirmed that they collected a total of 186 spent ammunition shell casings on the island.

=== Rescue and emergency response ===
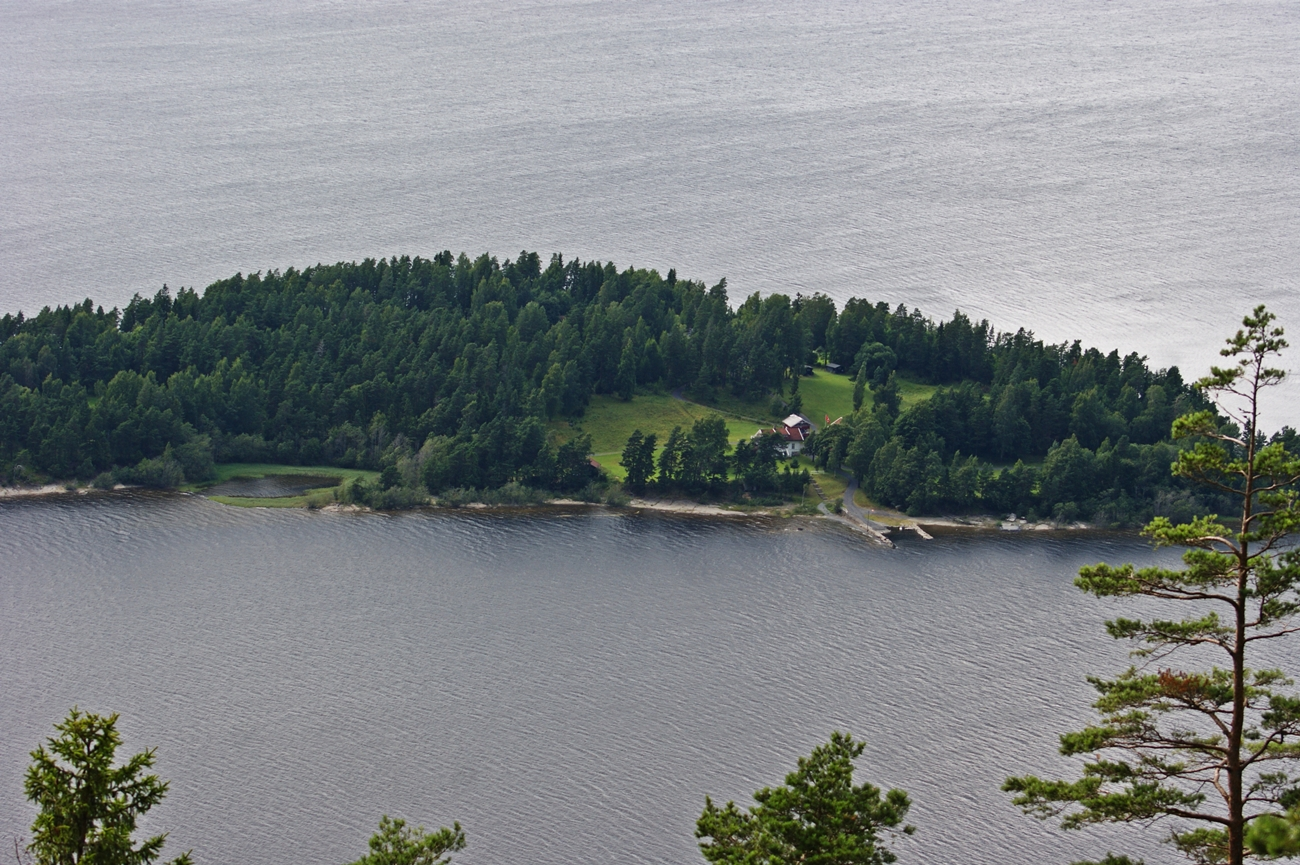
Utøya seen from above in 2012

The first shot was fired at 17:22. The emergency medical services were informed about the shooting two minutes later. One minute after that, the police in Oslo were informed. They immediately tried to reach Utøya as quickly as possible, but did not have a helicopter that could take them straight to the island. By 17:30, Delta, the police tactical unit in Oslo, were on the way to Utøya by car.

One of the first to arrive on the scene was Marcel Gleffe, a German resident of Ski staying at Utvika Camping on the mainland. Recognising gunshots, he piloted his boat to the island and began throwing life-jackets to young people in the water, rescuing as many as he could in four or five trips, after which the police asked him to stop. The Daily Telegraph credited him with saving up to 30 lives. Another 40 were saved by Hege Dalen and Toril Hansen, a married couple on vacation in the area. Dalen was helping from land while Hansen and a neighbour camper made several trips to rescue people in the water. Several dozen more were rescued by Kasper Ilaug, who made three trips to the island. Ilaug, a local resident, received a telephone call that "something terrible" was happening on Utøya and requesting help. He initially thought the call was a prank, but acted anyway.

Delta reached the meeting point at 18:09, but had to wait a few minutes for a boat to take them across. They reached Utøya at 18:25. When confronted by the heavily armed police on the island, the gunman initially hesitated for a few seconds. When an officer yelled "surrender or be shot" he laid down his weapons.

Breivik called the 112 emergency phone number at least twice to surrender, at 18:01 and 18:26, and continued killing people in between. The police say Breivik hung up both times; they tried to call him back but did not succeed.

When the police arrived at the scene, they were met by survivors begging the officers to throw away their weapons, as they were afraid that the men in uniforms would again open fire on them.

During the attack, 69 people were killed, and of the 517 survivors, 66 were wounded.

==== Shortage of transport capacity ====
The Norwegian police did not have helicopters suitable for transporting groups of police for an airdrop. The one they had was useful only for surveillance and the helicopter crew were on summer vacation.

When the local police arrived at Utøykaia, less than 30 minutes after the first shot was fired, they could not find a suitable boat to reach the island. They were then ordered to observe and report.

AUF's own ferry, the 50-passenger MS Thorbjørn, was used by Breivik to go to Utøya. Shortly after the first shot was fired, nine people were leaving the island on the ferry, among them the AUF leader Eskil Pedersen. Believing there could be additional threats in the area, they moved the ferry away from the island. As a result, the vessel was not immediately available to assist the police when they arrived at Utøykaia, the usual ferry landing on the mainland.

The police therefore had to use their own rigid-hulled inflatable boat (RHIB). On the day of the event, this boat was in Hønefoss, and had to be transported to the lake and launched before it could be used. When Delta boarded the RHIB it took on some water and after a few hundred metres, the engine stopped, probably due to water in the fuel. Two minutes later they took over a civilian boat that was sent to assist them. The episode was captured on video. A minute or two after the video ends, a faster civilian boat arrived to help. Four Delta officers boarded the boat. Not wanting to waste any more time, the civilian couple took the police to Utøya.

Some have criticised the police for not using a helicopter, for not immediately getting into small boats, and for endangering the couple who drove the civilian boat.

=== Arrest of an innocent survivor ===
On arriving in Utøya, the police arrested, in addition to Breivik, Anzor Djoukaev, an innocent 17-year-old survivor who represented the Akershus branch of AUF. The youth was reportedly stripped naked and locked up in a jail cell, located only metres away from the cell housing the self-confessed killer. The victim, who as a child had witnessed mass murders in Chechnya, was suspected of being an accomplice because his haircut was different from that shown on his identity document, and because he did not react to the carnage with the same tears and hysteria as most of the other survivors. He was kept in custody for 17 hours. Lawyer Harald Stabell criticised the police for failing to contact the youth's family, who feared he was killed, and for interrogating the victim without a lawyer present.

== Casualties ==
The attacks were the deadliest in Norway since World War II, and a survey found that one in four Norwegians knew someone affected by the attacks.

=== In Oslo ===
Oslo, ages of those killed
Age	Deaths
26	1
30	1
32	2
34	1
51	1
56	1
61	1
Total: 8

Eight people were killed in the explosion; the blast, shock wave and debris immediately killed six people, while two others died quickly afterwards from their wounds. Of the 325 people estimated to have been in the government buildings, around them and in the surrounding area, at least 210 people received physical injuries from the blast and debris. While most were relatively minor and could be treated at the local casualty clinic, 12 people received more serious injuries. Ten were sent to Ullevål University Hospital (OUS, Ullevål), four with moderate to serious and six with critical injuries, and two to Aker University Hospital (OUS, Aker). A doctor at one of the Oslo University Hospitals (OUS) said the hospital staff were treating head, chest and abdominal wounds.

Prime Minister Jens Stoltenberg was at his official residence near the Royal Palace, preparing the speech he was scheduled to give at Utøya the next day. Norway's finance minister, Sigbjørn Johnsen, was on vacation in Denmark at the time.

Fewer people than usual were in the area because the bombing took place during July, the usual holiday month for Norwegians, and since it was Friday afternoon, most government employees had gone home for the weekend.

Fatalities in Oslo

- Tove Åshill Knutsen, 56, Oslo
- Hanna Endresen, 61, Oslo
- Kai Hauge, 32, Oslo
- Jon Vegard Lervåg, 32, Oslo
- Ida Marie Hill, 34, Oslo
- Hanne Ekroll Løvlie, 30, Oslo
- Anne Lise Holter, 51, Våler in Østfold
- Kjersti Berg Sand, 26, Nord-Odal

=== In Utøya ===
Utøya, age of those killed
Age	Deaths
14	2
15	7
16	8
17	16
18	17
19	5
20	1
21	3
23	2
25	1
27	1
28	1
30	1
43	2
45	1
51	1
Total: 69
Average age: 19.6

The scope of what happened at the island was initially very confusing, and the first official figures given was that at least 10 people had been killed. As the evening progressed several eyewitness reports put this number in doubt, and at approximately 03:50 (CEST) on 23 July, NRK1 and TV2, the two primary Norwegian television networks, broadcast a live press conference from the Sentrum police station in Oslo where Norway's National Police Commissioner Øystein Mæland stated the number of fatalities at Utøya to have reached "at least 80" with the count expected to increase.

On 25 July, a police spokesperson revealed that the death toll of the victims on Utøya had been revised downwards to 68 after the casualties had been counted on their return to the mainland. They added that the number of people missing was still high and that the number of casualties could be as high as 86. On 29 July police announced that one of the severely wounded victims from Utøya had died in hospital, bringing the death toll from the island massacre to 69.

On 26 July, the Norwegian police began releasing the names and dates of birth of the victims on their website. By 29 July, the names of all 77 victims (8 from the bomb attack, 69 from Utøya) had been published, the last, a shooting victim, having been found on the 28th.

Of the 69 people who died at the attack on the island, 57 were killed by one or more shots through the head. In total, 67 people were killed by gunshots, and two more died trying to escape: one by drowning and one by falling off a cliff. In total, Breivik fired at least 186 shots, and still had a "considerable amount of ammunition" left.

In the aftermath, of the 564 people on the island at the time, 69 people died and at least 110 people were physically injured. An estimated 50 people were treated at the locally set up casualty clinic, and were treated for relatively minor injuries such as cuts, bruises and hypothermia after fleeing and swimming from the island. It was cloudy and rainy on Utøya that day; air temperature was varying between 14–15 °C (57–59 °F), water temperature around the island was 14–15 °C (57–59 °F) and the shortest distance to the mainland was around 600 metres (660 yards). Sixty people were transported to surrounding hospitals, including 55 with serious to critical injuries. The chief surgeon who treated the wounds at one of the hospitals said he had never seen similar wounds during his 23 years of practice, and explained that the bullets were extremely fragmented in their path through the body. Thirty-three people had been directly hit by one or more bullets and survived, but a 23-year-old man who was shot died two days later in hospital from the bullet wounds to his head and back.

The 564 people on the island at the time were visitors from all over Norway as well as some from foreign countries. Those killed included people from all but one of Norway's 19 counties—the exception being Aust-Agder—and a woman from the country of Georgia. Wounded people were from the entire country, including Svalbard, and together with the casualties from Oslo, an average of a quarter of Norway's population knew a victim affected by the attacks, according to a later survey. Several of the dead and wounded, or their parents, were personal friends of high-ranking government ministers. Trond Berntsen, an off-duty, unarmed police officer and step-brother of Norway's crown princess (later queen) Mette-Marit, was the first to be shot dead.

Fatalities in Utøya

- Mona Abdinur, 18, Oslo
- Maria Maagerø Johannesen, 17, Nøtterøy, Vestfold county
- Ismail Haji Ahmed, 19, Hamar, Hedmark county
- Ronja Søttar Johansen, 17, Vefsn, Nordland county
- Thomas Margido Antonsen, 16, Oslo
- Sondre Kjøren, 17, Orkdal, Sør-Trøndelag county
- Porntip Ardam, 21, Oslo
- Margrethe Bøyum Kløven, 16, Bærum, Akershus county
- Modupe Ellen Awoyemi, 15, Drammen, Buskerud county
- Syvert Knudsen, 17, Lyngdal, Vest-Agder county
- Lene Maria Bergum, 19, Namsos, Nord-Trøndelag county
- Anders Kristiansen, 18, Bardu, Troms county
- Kevin Daae Berland, 15, Askøy, Hordaland county
- Elisabeth Trønnes Lie, 16, Halden, Østfold county
- Trond Berntsen, 51, Øvre Eiker, Buskerud county
- Gunnar Linaker, 23, Bardu, Troms county
- Sverre Flåte Bjørkavåg, 28, Sula, Sør-Trøndelag county
- Tamta Lipartelliani, 23, Kutaisi, Georgia
- Torjus Jakobsen Blattmann, 17, Kristiansand, Vest-Agder county
- Eva Kathinka Lütken, 17, Sarpsborg, Østfold county
- Monica Bøsei, 45, Hole, Buskerud county
- Even Flugstad Malmedal, 18, Gjøvik, Oppland county
- Carina Borgund, 18, Oslo
- Tarald Kuven Mjelde, 18, Osterøy
- Johannes Buø, 14, Mandal, Vest-Agder county
- Ruth Benedicte Vatndal Nilsen, 15, Tønsberg, Vestfold county
- Åsta Sofie Helland Dahl, 16, Sortland, Nordland county
- Håkon Ødegaard, 17, Trondheim, Sør-Trøndelag county (drowned)
- Sondre Furseth Dale, 17, Haugesund, Rogaland county
- Emil Okkenhaug, 15, Levanger, Nord-Trøndelag county
- Monica Iselin Didriksen, 18, Sund, Hordaland county
- Diderik Aamodt Olsen, 19, Nesodden, Akershus county
- Gizem Dogan, 17, Trondheim, Sør-Trøndelag county
- Henrik Pedersen, 27, Porsanger, Finnmark county
- Andreas Edvardsen, 18, Sarpsborg, Østfold county
- Rolf Christopher Johansen Perreau, 25, Trondheim, Sør-Trøndelag county
- Tore Eikeland, 21, Osterøy, Hordaland county
- Karar Mustafa Qasim, 19, Vestby, Akershus county
- Bendik Rosnæs Ellingsen, 18, Rygge, Østfold county
- Bano Abobakar Rashid, 18, Nesodden, Akershus county
- Aleksander Aas Eriksen, 16, Meråker, Nord-Trøndelag county
- Henrik Rasmussen, 18, Hadsel, Nordland county
- Andrine Bakkene Espeland, 16, Fredrikstad, Østfold county
- Synne Røyneland, 18, Oslo
- Hanne Balch Fjalestad, 43, Lunner, Oppland county
- Ida Beathe Rogne, 17, Østre Toten, Oppland county
- Silje Merete Fjellbu, 17, Tinn, Telemark county
- Simon Sæbø, 18, Salangen, Troms county
- Hanne Kristine Fridtun, 19, Stryn, Sogn og Fjordane county
- Marianne Sandvik, 16, Hundvag, Stavanger
- Andreas Dalby Grønnesby, 17, Stange, Hedmark county (fell off cliff)
- Fredrik Lund Schjetne, 18, Eidsvoll, Akershus county
- Snorre Haller, 30, Trondheim, Sør-Trøndelag county
- Lejla Selaci, 17, Fredrikstad, Østfold county
- Rune Havdal, 43, Øvre Eiker, Buskerud county
- Birgitte Smetbak, 15, Nøtterøy, Vestfold county
- Guro Vartdal Håvoll, 18, Ørsta, Møre og Romsdal
- Isabel Victoria Green Sogn, 17, Oslo
- Ingrid Berg Heggelund, 18, As, Akershus county
- Silje Stamneshagen, 18, Askøy, Hordaland county
- Karin Elena Holst, 15, Rana, Nordland county
- Victoria Stenberg, 17, Nes, Akershus county
- Eivind Hovden, 15, Tokke, Telemark county
- Tina Sukuvara, 18, Vadsø, Finnmark county
- Jamil Rafal Mohamad Jamil, 20, Eigersund, Rogaland county
- Sharidyn Svebakk-Bøhn, 14, Drammen, Buskerud county
- Steinar Jessen, 16, Alta, Finnmark county
- Håvard Vederhus, 21, Oslo
- Espen Jørgensen, 17, Bodø, Nordland county

== Perpetrator ==
Public broadcaster NRK and several other Norwegian media outlets identified the attacker as Anders Behring Breivik. He was arrested on Utøya for the shootings and also linked to the Oslo bombing. He was charged with terrorism for both attacks. According to his attorney, Breivik acknowledged that he was responsible for both the bomb and the shooting during interrogation but denied culpability, as he asserted that his actions were "atrocious but necessary". At his arraignment on 25 July, Breivik was remanded into custody for eight weeks, the first half to be in solitary confinement. Breivik wanted to have an open hearing, and attend it wearing a uniform of his own design, but both requests were denied by the presiding judge.

=== Mental health ===
Following his arrest, Breivik underwent examination by court-appointed forensic psychiatrists, who diagnosed him with paranoid schizophrenia and concluded he had been psychotic at the time of the attacks and was criminally insane. Although criticised in newspaper debates, the submitted report was approved with no remarks by the Norwegian Board of Forensic Medicine after an extended panel of experts had reviewed it.

According to his defence attorney, Breivik initially expressed surprise and felt insulted by the conclusions in the report. He later stated that "this provides new opportunities". Following the criticism of the psychiatric report, the court in January 2012 approved a second psychiatric examination. The report from this examination declared Breivik to be sane in April 2012. Ultimately, the verdict and ruling of the district court's five-judge panel agreed that Breivik was sane.

=== Political and religious views ===
Breivik is linked to a 1,518-page compendium entitled 2083: A European Declaration of Independence bearing the name "Andrew Berwick". The file was e-mailed to 1,003 addresses about 90 minutes before the bomb blast in Oslo. Analysts described him as having Islamophobic views and a hatred of Islam, and as someone who considered himself as a knight dedicated to stemming Muslim immigration into Europe.

The introductory chapter of the manifesto defining cultural Marxism is a copy of Political Correctness: A Short History of an Ideology by the Free Congress Foundation. Major parts of the compendium are attributed to the pseudonymous Norwegian blogger Fjordman. The text has multiple word-for-word similarities with the Unabomber Manifesto, only substituting terms like "cultural Marxists" for Ted Kaczynski's "leftists" and, in a section criticizing affirmative action, "Muslims" for "black people". The New York Times described American influences in the writings, noting that the compendium mentions the anti-Muslim American Robert Spencer 64 times and cites Spencer's works at great length. The work of Bat Ye'or is cited dozens of times. Far-right and anti-Islam blogger Pamela Geller, the novel The Turner Diaries, Neo-pagan writer Koenraad Elst and Daniel Pipes are also mentioned as sources of inspiration. The manifesto further contains quotes from Middle East expert Bernard Lewis, Edmund Burke, Mahatma Gandhi, Thomas Jefferson and George Orwell, as well as from Jeremy Clarkson's Sunday Times column and Melanie Phillips' Daily Mail column. The publication speaks in admiration of Ayaan Hirsi Ali, Bruce Bawer, Srđa Trifković, and Henryk M. Broder. The compendium advocates a restoration of patriarchy, which it claims would save European culture.

The compendium contains his militant far-right ideology and xenophobic worldview, which espouses an array of political concepts; including support for varying degrees of cultural conservatism, right-wing populism, ultranationalism, Islamophobia, far-right Zionism, and Serbian paramilitarism. It regards Islam and "cultural Marxism" as the enemy and argues for the annihilation of "Eurabia" and multiculturalism, to preserve a Christian Europe. He further urged Europeans to restore the historic crusades against Islam as in the Middle Ages. A video Breivik released on YouTube 6 hours before the attack has been described as promoting violence towards leftists and Muslims who reside in Western Europe.

Among other things, in the manifesto he identified the Beneš Decrees, which facilitated the expulsion of Germans from Czechoslovakia after the Second World War, as an example for committing that act on European Muslims. In his manifesto he also urges the Hindus to drive Muslims out of India. He demands the gradual deportation of all Muslims from Europe from 2011 to 2083 through repatriation. He blames feminism for allowing the erosion of the fabric of European society.

Breivik's writings mention the English Defence League, claiming that he had contact with senior members of the EDL, and that a Norwegian version of the group was "in the process of gaining strength". He wrote that the EDL were "naïve fools" because in his words the EDL "harshly condemns any and all revolutionary conservative movements that employ terror as a tool". EDL leader Tommy Robinson denounced Breivik and the attack on 26 July 2011 and denied any links with the Norwegian.

After being apprehended, Breivik was characterised by police officials as being a right-wing extremist. Breivik is described by the newspaper Verdens Gang as considering himself a conservative nationalist. According to The Australian, Breivik was highly critical of Muslim immigration into Christian societies, is pro-Israel and an admirer of the Tea Party movement in the United States. Deputy police chief Roger Andresen initially told reporters that "We have no more information than ... what has been found on [his] own websites, which is that it goes towards the right and that it is, so to speak, Christian fundamentalist." Subsequently, others have disputed Andresen's characterisation of Breivik as a Christian fundamentalist. Furthermore, Breivik stated that "myself and many more like me do not necessarily have a personal relationship with Jesus Christ and God." According to the International Business Times, in his manifesto, he "did not see himself as religious", but he did identify as a cultural Christian and wrote about the differences between cultural and religious Christians, but stressed that both were Christians, and shared the same identity and goals. After his imprisonment, Breivik stated he had never personally identified as a Christian, and called his religion Odinism, stating that he would "pray and sacrifice" to Odin. He also identified himself as a fascist and a national socialist, stating that he previously exploited counterjihadist rhetoric in order to protect "ethno-nationalists".

He has written many posts on the far-right website document.no. He attended meetings of "Documents venner" (Friends of Document), affiliated with the Document.no website. He is a former member of the Progress Party (FrP) and its youth wing FpU. According to the then FpU leader Ove Vanebo, Breivik was active early in the 2000s, but he left the party as his viewpoints became more extreme.

In his YouTube video, he expressed admiration of past European leaders who fought against Islam and Muslims, naming Charles Martel, Richard the Lionheart, El Cid, Vlad the Impaler, Jacques de Molay, Tsar Nicholas, and John III Sobieski. A social media website created bearing Breivik's name and picture but of unknown authorship refers to him as an admirer of Winston Churchill and Max Manus, and also of controversial Dutch politician Geert Wilders, whose political party, the Party for Freedom, is described by the site as "the only true party of conservatives". The music that is played in the video comes off the soundtrack to the video game Age of Conan: Hyborian Adventures.

=== Unsubstantiated claims of Breivik being assisted ===
There was suspicion at the time of the attack that there were accomplices, and the police initially prepared to meet two to five shooters on Utøya. Several youths at Utøya reported to be convinced that there was more than one shooter, with some reports of shots fired from the mainland. A second shooter at Utøya was described by several youths as having thick dark hair, about 1.80 metres (5 feet 11 inches) tall who did not wear a police uniform, while carrying a pistol and a rifle. During judicial examination, at least two witnesses independently of each other both described two different shooters at Utøya, while a third witness was reported to have swum from the island beside a previously unknown dark-haired man. After his arrest Breivik claimed he acted with accomplices, but later changed his statements to his acting alone. On 24 July 2011, six people were arrested in Oslo suspected of having connections with the attacks; all were released. The police later issued a statement that there was only found evidence of one shooter at Utøya, amid "widespread conspiracy theories" of there having been more than one shooter.

Both during his trial and in his manifesto, Breivik stated to have been inspired by jihadist groups, and stated his willingness to work together with jihadist groups in order to conduct attacks with weapons of mass destruction against Western targets.

== Reactions ==
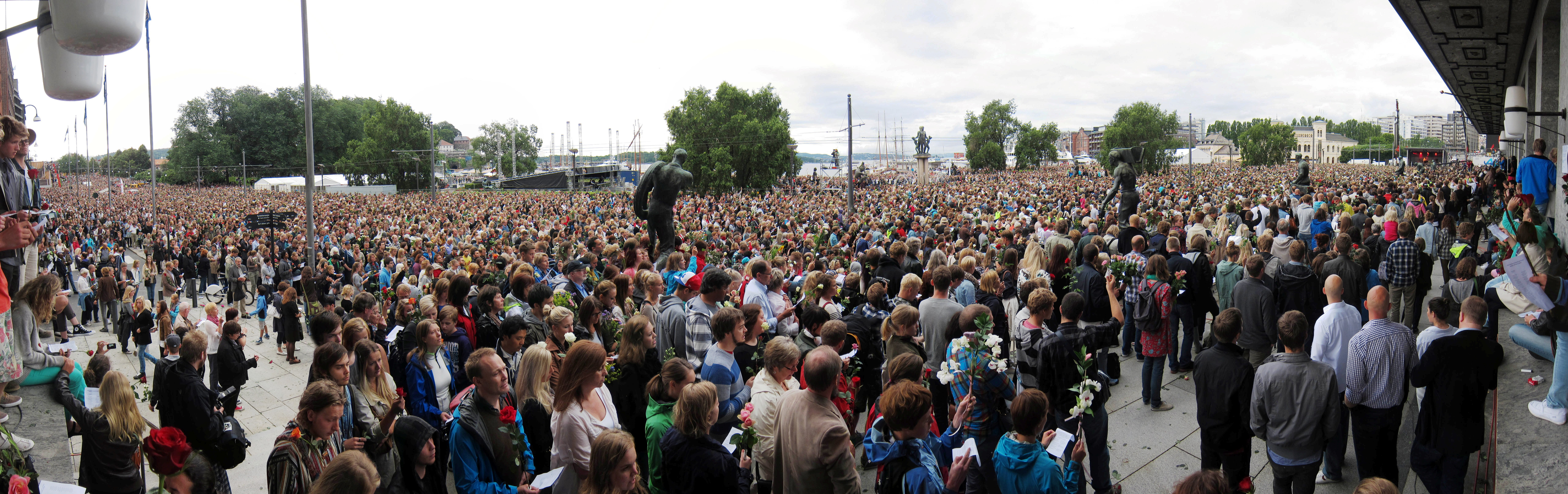
Flower march in Sentrum, Oslo, on 25 July 2011 in the aftermath of the attacks. An estimated 200,000 attended the flower march.

Initially, Magnus Ranstorp and other terror experts suspected that Islamic terrorist groups such as Al-Qaeda were behind the attacks. In the immediate aftermath of the attack, non-ethnic Norwegians, especially Muslim Norwegians, were subjected to harassment and violence.

In the initial hours after the attacks, the group called Ansar al-Jihad al-Alami ("Helpers of the Global Jihad") claimed responsibility for the attacks. Will McCants said the group have claimed responsibility for the attacks by means of a statement to the internet forum Shmukh that he says was eventually removed.

The New York Times reported that the group claimed responsibility for the attacks, citing a statement identified by a terrorism analyst that said they were a response to the presence of Norwegian forces in Afghanistan and "unspecified insults to the Prophet Muhammad." Giving its source as a report on Norway TV, The Wall Street Journal noted the statement from Ansar al-Jihad al-Alami said, "This is just the beginning of what will come"; while also noting that, "It's unclear that the group has taken responsibility." The Times said that Norwegian television reports indicated that Ansar al-Jihad al-Alami had denied involvement in the attacks. The group was described by Karen J. Greenberg, executive director of the Center on Law and Security at New York University School of Law as a Kurdistan-based affiliate of Al-Qaeda led by Abu Suleiman al-Naser.

=== Domestic ===
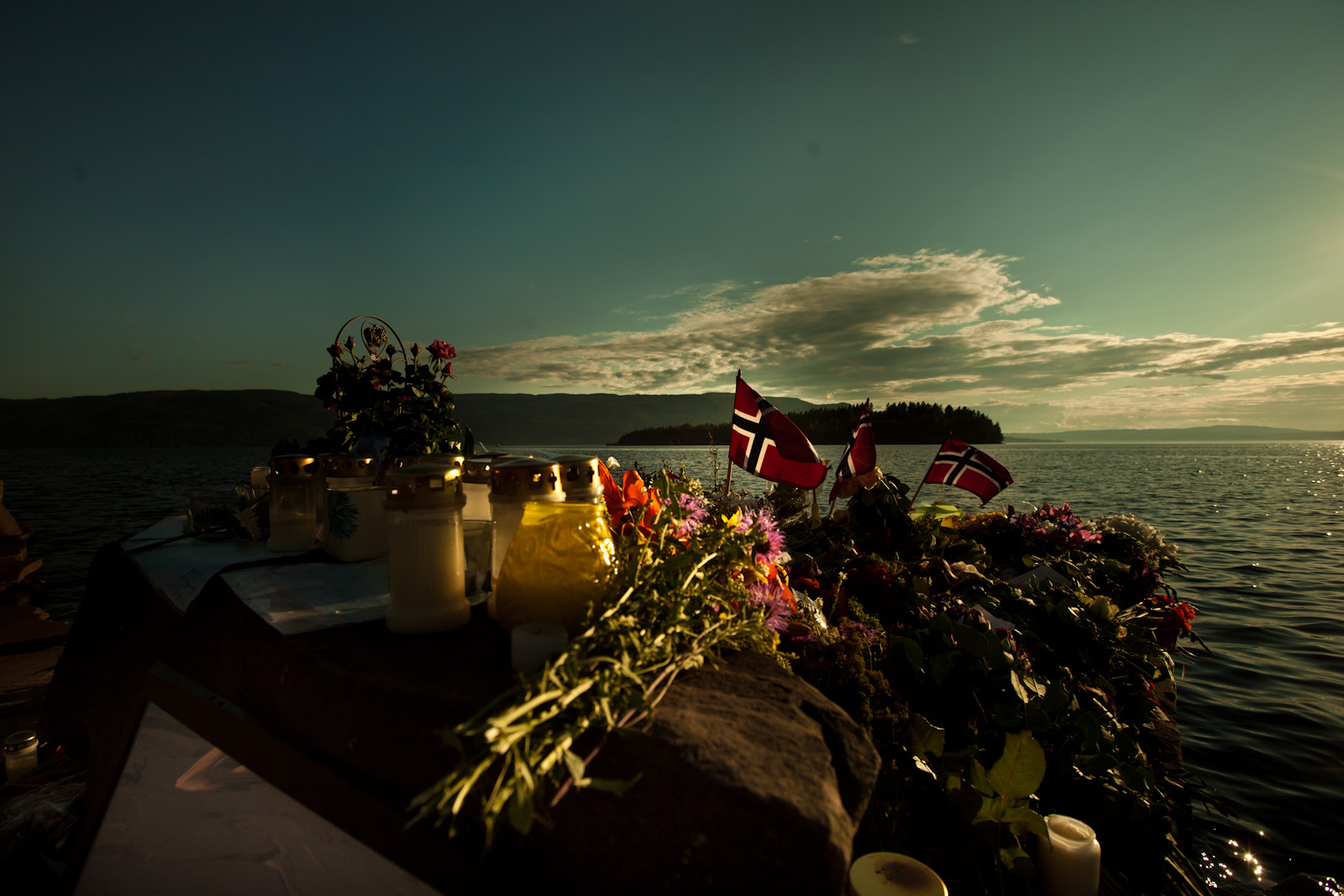
Temporary memorial with Utøya in the background, 27 July 2011

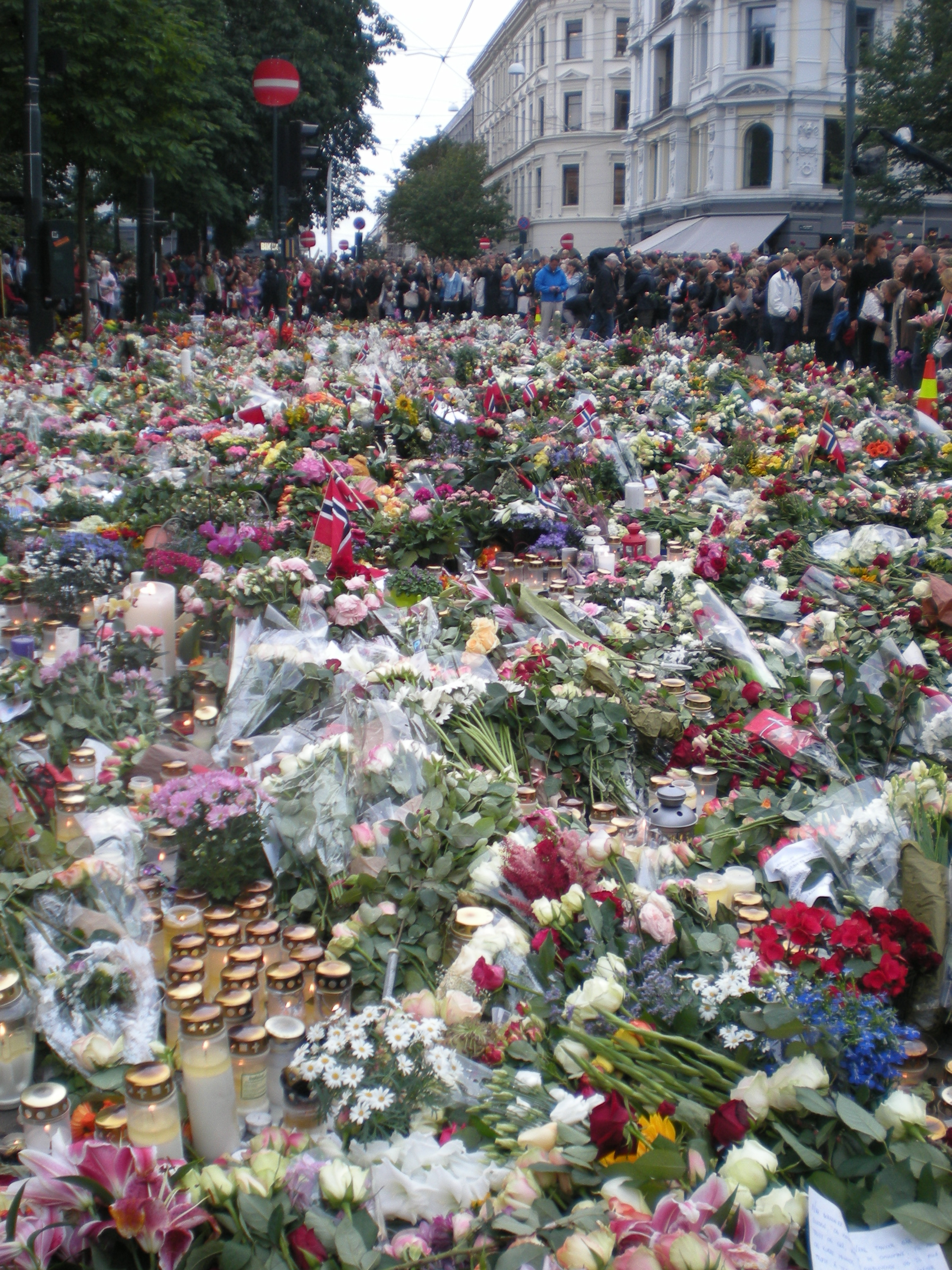
Flowers laid in front of Oslo Cathedral, 25 July 2011

King Harald V sent his condolences to the victims and their families, and urged unity. He and Queen Sonja personally visited the victims of the attacks, as well as the families of those killed.

At a press conference the morning after the attacks, Prime Minister Jens Stoltenberg and Justice Minister Knut Storberget addressed the country. Stoltenberg called the attack a "national tragedy" and the worst atrocity in Norway since World War II. Stoltenberg further vowed that the attack would not hurt Norwegian democracy, and said the proper answer to the violence was "more democracy, more openness, but not naivety". In his speech at the memorial service on 24 July 2011, he opined what would be a proper reaction: "No one has said it better than the AUF girl who was interviewed by CNN: 'If one man can show so much hate, think how much love we could show, standing together.'"

The leader of the Workers' Youth League, Eskil Pedersen, vowed to "return to Utøya" and urged Norway to continue its tradition of openness and tolerance.

Leaders of Norwegian political parties expressed grief and sent condolences in public statements.

On 1 August 2011, Norway's parliament, nominally in recess for the summer, reconvened for an extraordinary session to honour the victims of the attack. In a departure from parliamentary procedure, both King Harald V and Crown Prince Haakon were present. The president of Norway's Parliament, Dag Terje Andersen, read out loud the names of all 77 victims. The session was open to the public, but due to limited seating, priority was given to relatives of the deceased. August 21 in Norway was declared a day of national mourning to commemorate the victims of the terrorist attack.

The seven political parties in the parliament agreed to postpone the electoral campaign for local elections, held in September, until mid-August. School debates were cancelled, though the school elections were not.

On 13 August 2012, Norway's prime minister received the Gjørv Report, which concludes that Breivik could have been stopped from carrying out the Utøya massacre. The report had been ordered by parliament in August 2011.

=== International ===
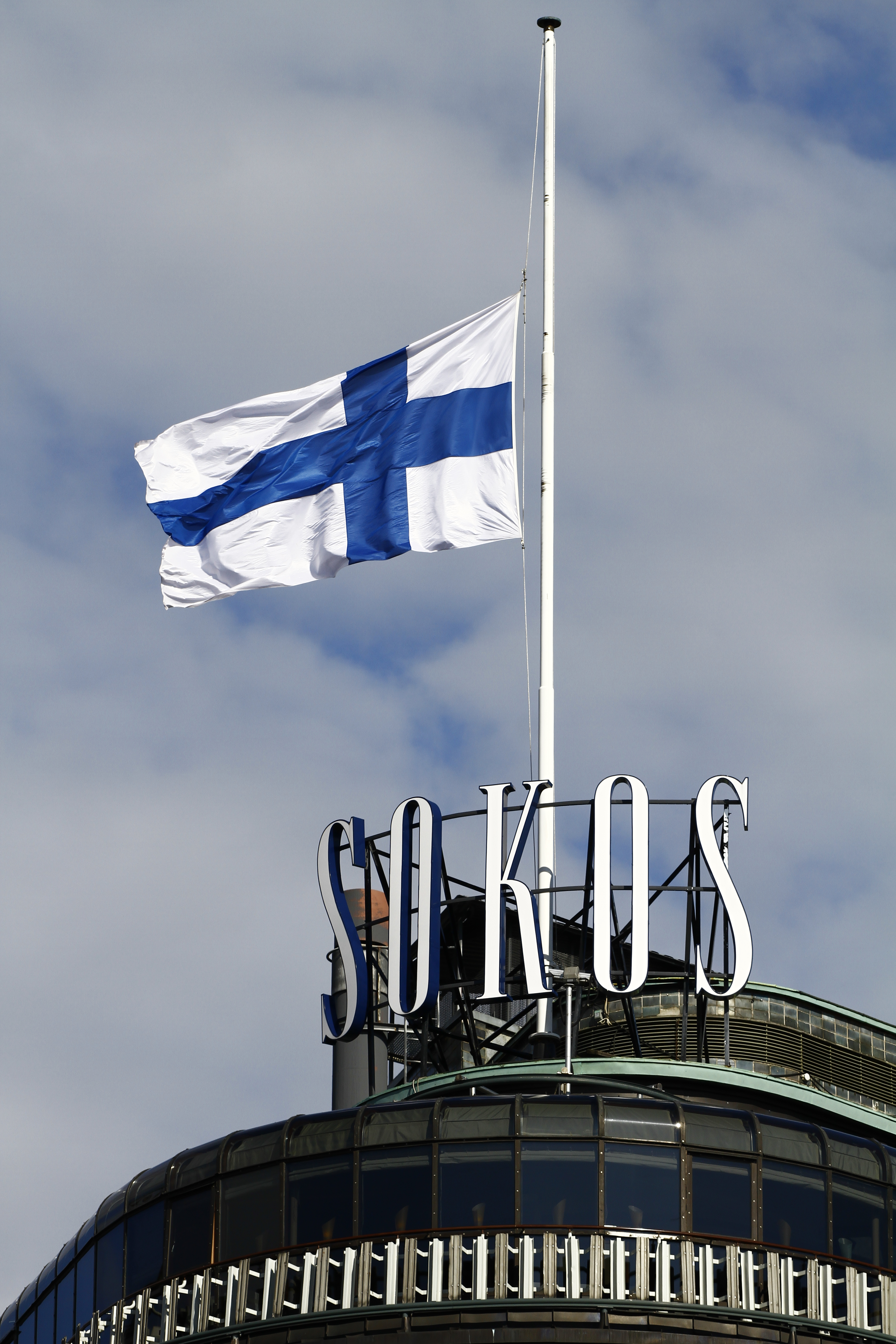
The Finnish flag flying at half-mast in Helsinki after the attacks

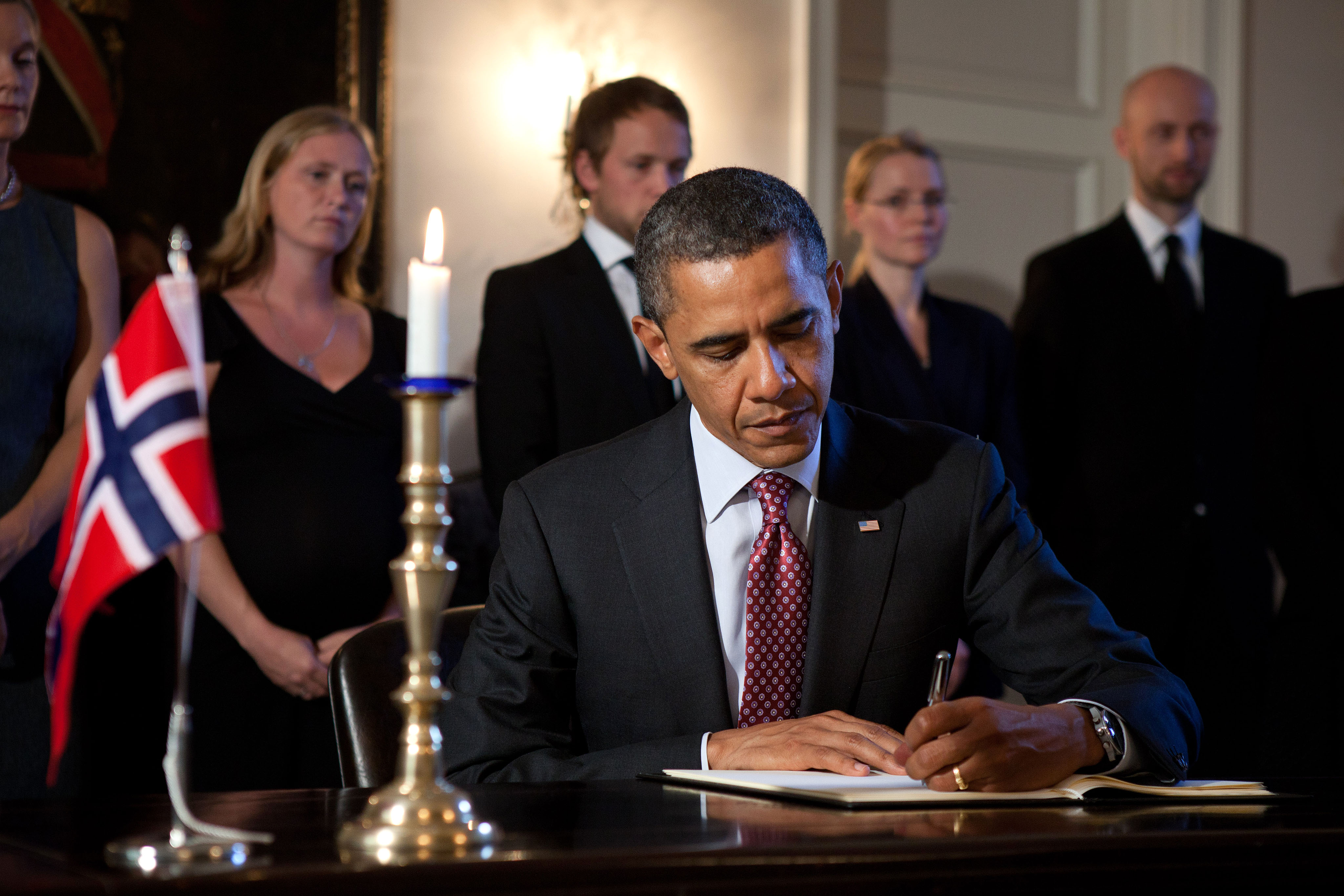
President Barack Obama leaving his written condolences at the Norwegian embassy in Washington D.C.

The United Nations, the European Union, NATO, and governments around the world expressed their condemnation of the attacks, condolences, and solidarity with Norway. However, there have also been reports of Western European right-wing populist politicians giving support to the killings or excusing them as a result of multi-culturalism. Interviewed on a popular radio show, the Italian MEP Francesco Speroni, a leading member of the Lega Nord, the junior partner in Berlusconi's conservative coalition, said: "Breivik's ideas are in defence of western civilisation." Similar views were voiced by Italian MEP Mario Borghezio. Werner Koenigshofer, a member of the National Council of Austria, was expelled from the right-wing Freedom Party of Austria after equating the massacre with the death of millions of fetuses through abortion.

On 25 July 2011, at noon (CEST), each of the Nordic countries held a minute of silence to dignify the victims of the two attacks. Norway's minute of silence stretched to five minutes. In Oslo, a city of approximately 600,000 inhabitants, an estimated 200,000 people attended a "flower march".

The Norwegian media reported criticism against Fox News and its commentator Glenn Beck for their coverage of the attacks. Beck's comparison of the AUF to the Hitler Youth led Frank Aarebrot, a Norwegian professor with political sympathies to the Norwegian Labour Party, to call Beck a "fascist" and "swine".

=== Memorial ceremonies ===
A number of memorial ceremonies took place following the attacks. On 25 July 2011, around 200,000 people took part in a "rose march" at Rådhusplassen in Oslo. The NRK memorial concert, titled "Mitt lille land" ("My Little Country") and named for the song "Mitt lille land" which "came to symbolize the sorrow many people went through", took place in Oslo Cathedral on 30 July 2011. A national memorial ceremony took place on 21 August 2011. In September 2011, the Norwegian People's Aid and Sony Music released the memorial album Mitt lille land.

== Legal proceedings ==
The police initially kept the choice of counsel secret after request from the attorney. Attorney Geir Lippestad elected to act on behalf of Breivik's defence; Breivik had specifically requested that Lippestad become his attorney.

On 25 July 2011, Breivik was arraigned in Oslo District Court. The police feared that Breivik would use the hearing as an opportunity to communicate with possible accomplices. Because of this, the arraignment was held completely closed to the media and all other spectators. Instead, judge Kim Heger held a press conference shortly afterwards where he read the court's decision. The practice of completely closed court hearings is extremely rare in the Norwegian justice system.

The debate over which criminal charges to file was fierce. Many police attorneys wanted high treason or crimes against humanity. The prosecution ended up indicting Breivik on terrorism charges. Breivik admitted to being the gunman at Utøya and the perpetrator behind the Oslo bomb, also admitting all the other actual events. Nonetheless, he pleaded not guilty, stating "I do not recognise this justice system". District Attorney Christian Hatlo asked that Breivik be detained for eight weeks without mail or visitation. The judge ruled in favour of the prosecution, stating "the accused is an imminent danger to society and must be confined for the safety of himself and others. It is highly probable that he is guilty of the alleged crimes and imprisonment is necessary to prevent destruction of evidence". In accordance with the prosecution's wishes, Breivik was remanded to eight weeks detention without mail or visitation, four of those in complete isolation, to be renewed no later than 19 September 2011. He was immediately transferred to Ila Landsfengsel, a maximum security prison.

On 13 August 2011 Breivik was taken to Utøya by police to recreate his actions on the day of the massacre. Neither the media nor the public was alerted to the operation. The police explained that the surprise walk-through was necessary because Breivik was to be charged and tried for all 77 murders individually. The police deemed it less offensive to the survivors to do it before rather than during the trial. Despite the many police boats and helicopters, none of the civilians who had come to lay down flowers on the shore that day perceived what was happening just a few hundred metres across the lake from them for eight hours. On the evening of 14 August the police held a press conference about the reconstruction. It was reported that Breivik was not unmoved by his return to Utøya, but that he showed no remorse. Inspector Pål Fredrik Hjort Kraby described Breivik's behaviour and indifference on the island as "unreal", as he had over the course of eight hours willingly showed the police exactly how he had carried out all of the 69 murders.

The trial began on 16 April 2012 and lasted until 19 June 2012. 170 media organisations were accredited to cover the proceedings. Breivik acknowledged that he had committed the offences but pleaded not guilty as he believed the killing was "necessary". The main issue for Breivik was that he was not to be deemed "insane" or "psychotic", because that would lose the meaning of his message.

On 24 August, Breivik was found to be legally sane by the panel of five judges. He was sentenced to preventative detention (forvaring), a sentence of 21 years in prison which can be repeatedly extended by 5 years as long as he is considered a threat to society. This is the maximum sentence allowed by Norwegian law, and it is the only way to allow for life imprisonment.

== Aftermath ==
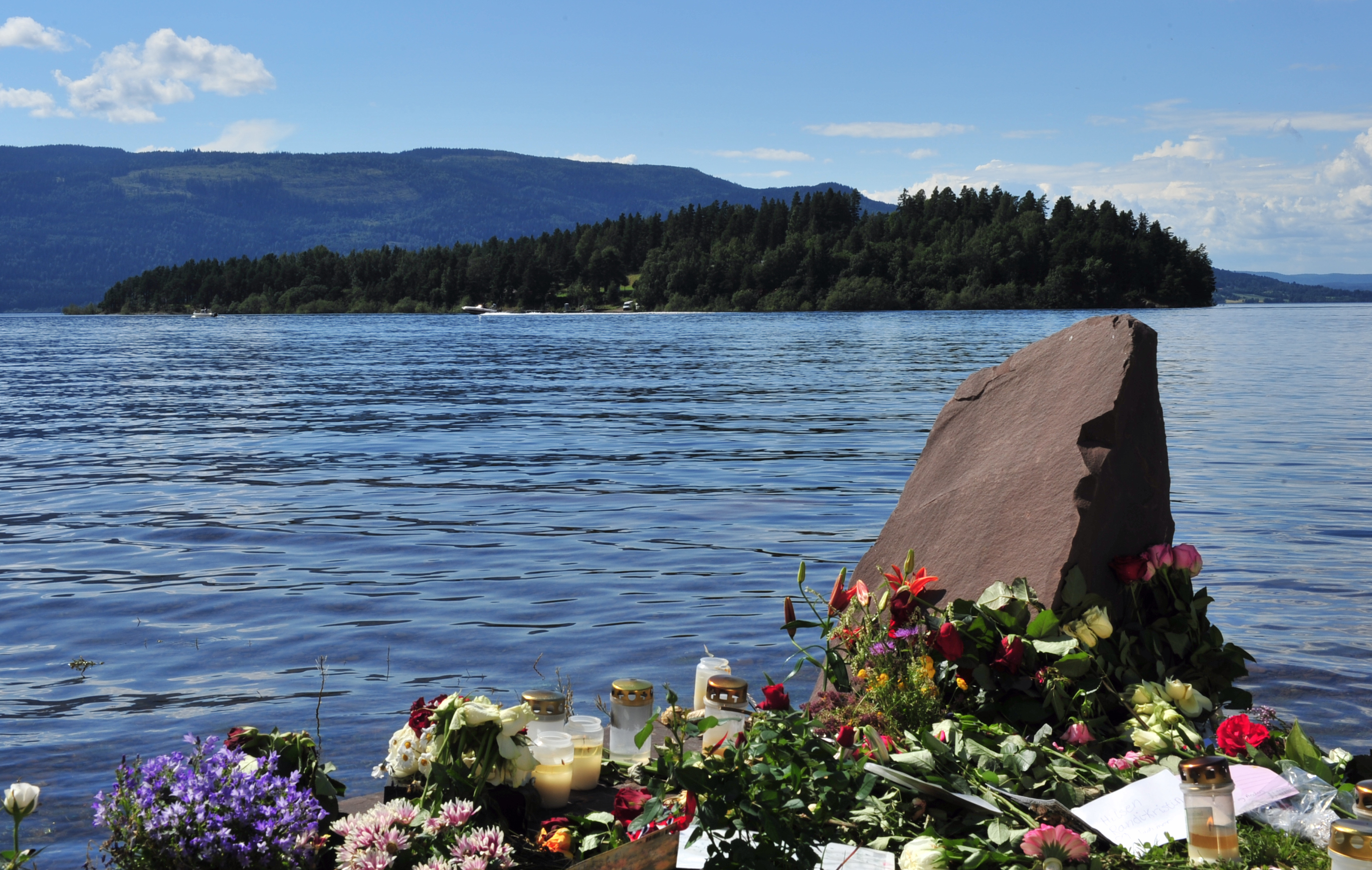
Memorial in view of Utøya

Coop Norway, a chain of retail stores in Norway, removed several games from its shelves as a result of the attack. Some of the titles includes games like Homefront, Call of Duty series, Sniper: Ghost Warrior, Counter-Strike Source and World of Warcraft. Some games were also temporarily removed from the Norwegian WiiWare catalogue, including an on-rails shooter game.

In the days following the attacks, Norway's largest represented political parties noted a significant increase in interest for membership from young people. Both the Norwegian Young Conservatives and the Progress Party's Youth, as well as the Workers' Youth League (AUF) had signed up a significant number of new members after a few days. The mother parties also reported an unusual increase in new member applications, with the Conservative Party and the Progress Party having signed up almost 1,000 new members each by early August, while the Labour Party reported over 6,000 new members at the end of the month.

Far-right groups such as Stop the Islamisation of Norway (SIAN) and the Norwegian Defence League (NDL), as well as the Democrats, had reportedly witnessed a boom in their memberships and interest by mid-August, with the Democrats party having signed up around one hundred new members, and the NDL around three hundred.

In the September local elections almost two months after the attacks, gains were made by the Conservative Party (up 9% to 28%), and to a lesser extent the Labour Party (up 2% to 32%). On the other hand, setbacks were witnessed by the Progress Party, the party Breivik had been a member of, (down 6% to 11%) and the Socialist Left Party (down 2% to 4%).

In the Gjørv Report, received by the prime minister in advance of a press conference on 13 August 2012, it was concluded that more actions could have been taken by authorities, to stop Breivik, to track him, or to interrupt his attacks. It also criticised the police action, in stark contrast to an internal report issued by the police earlier. A few days later, national police chief Øystein Mæland submitted his resignation, citing a lack of clear support for his position from his superiors and saying: "If the [justice] ministry and other political authorities do not clarify this matter unequivocally, it will become impossible for me to continue." His resignation was accepted and announced by Justice Minister Grete Faremo.

Vegard Grøslie Wennesland, a survivor of the incident, ran for parliament on a Labour Party ticket in the 2013 Norwegian parliamentary election. A further 33 Labour Party candidates in the election were Utøya survivors and of those, Åsmund Aukrust, Stine Renate Håheim and Fredric Holen Bjørdal were also elected. However, the result brought a coalition government of the Conservative party and the right-wing Progress Party, of which Breivik had been a member from 1999 until 2004, to power.

=== Embezzlement from terror attack victims fund ===
In 2016, one person was sentenced to 120 days in prison for embezzling 300,000 Norwegian kroner from Støttegruppen etter 22. juli, a Norwegian NGO; the money was supposed to have gone to victims of the terror attack. The perpetrator was a steward of the NGO.

=== Semi-automatic weapon ban for hunting and Mini-14 rifle ban ===
On 28 February 2018, Peter Frølich of the Norwegian parliament's committee on judicial affairs, said a proposal to ban semi-automatic weapons proposed the year prior now had enough political support to become law by 2021. The law banned the Ruger Mini-14 rifle model that was used in Utøya massacre and other semi-auto rifles for hunting. However, using semi-automatic firearms for shooting sports is still legal for sportsmen who have permission for practice and competition shooting from Dynamic Sports Shooting Norway (DSSN) or the Norwegian Reserve Officers' Association (NROF).

=== Copycat incidents ===
==== Polish copycat ====
On 20 November 2012, the Polish authorities announced the arrest of a 45-year-old lecturer in chemical engineering at the Agricultural University of Kraków under suspicion of preparing a similar attack. According to the authorities, Brunon Kwiecień was an admirer of Breivik and was further inspired by the 1995 Oklahoma City bombing. Poland's Internal Security Agency (ABW) first found out about Kwiecień after it launched investigation into Breivik's Polish contacts when it became known that Breivik had ordered some of the chemicals for his bomb from Poland via the internet. According to ABW, Kwiecień was preparing an attack against the Sejm, the lower house of the Polish parliament, using a car bomb. Apart from targeting the parliament, Kwiecień was also preparing murders of Monika Olejnik, an influential journalist, and Hanna Gronkiewicz-Waltz, the mayor of Warsaw.

Kwiecień tried to arm himself in 1997, however the authorities refused his application for a firearm permit. He later started arming himself illegally, mostly with weapons bought in Belgium. He had recruited four other people for his cause, however at least two of them were actually ABW's secret agents. He was convicted and sentenced to nine years of imprisonment on 19 April 2017, later dying in prison on 6 August 2019.

==== Christchurch mosque shootings ====
Brenton Harrison Tarrant, the Australian-born perpetrator of two consecutive mass shootings at mosques in Christchurch, New Zealand, said in his manifesto "The Great Replacement" (in reference to a far-right conspiracy theory from France by Renaud Camus) that he was particularly inspired by Breivik. Tarrant also claimed to have been in "brief contact" with him through an organisation Brevik was a member of known as "The Knights Templar". The shootings took place at Al Noor Mosque and Linwood Islamic Centre during Friday Prayer on 15 March 2019, killing 51 people and injuring 89.

== Memorial artwork ==
In July 2026, Norway unveiled a new memorial in Oslo honoring the 77 victims of the attacks. The unveiling, held just days before the attack's 15th anniversary, brought together survivors and victims' families in the city's renovated government district, near the site of the original bombing. The artwork titled Upholding was created by Matias Faldbakken and features a 12-metre stone mosaic of a wading bird native to Utoeya, set within a large blue steel frame, with the names of all 77 victims engraved on the structure.

=== National memorials ===
A national memorial stands at Johan Nygaardsvolds plass at Regjeringskvartalet in Oslo. It was unveiled on 22 July 2016, and is temporary.

==== National memorial at Utøya-kaia, Tyrifjorden ====
Construction on a national memorial at Utøya-kaia (on the shores of Tyrifjorden) in Hole, Buskerud, was completed in June 2022. The memorial consists of a curved staircase located by the dock for the ferry to Utoya island. There are 77 narrow bronze columns at the base of the steps, representing the number of victims of the attacks. They are positioned in two curved arcs, with the first "aimed at the sun as it stood in the sky when the bomb exploded in Oslo", and the second arc "aimed at the sun as it stood in the sky during the attack on Utoya."

The memorial was unveiled by Prime Minister Jonas Gahr Støre, in a ceremony also attended by Crown Prince Haakon, government ministers, the leader of AUF, and Prime Minister at the time of the attack then secretary of NATO, Jens Stoltenberg. He described the memorial as "a place that can always remind us of everything we lost, a place where our children and grandchildren can learn about what happened, and about the consequences of right-wing extremism and hate."

In 2020, sixteen neighbours of the construction site had sued to have the work stopped, the litigants claiming that the memorial would be a constant reminder about the terror of the attack, and that the expected influx of visitors would be an added source of strain on their health. One neighbour testified in court, that he rescued persons who had been wounded by the terrorist, and said: "We are again and again reminded about what happened. I will not have the strength to look at the columns [a design element of the memorial]. I will only be able to see the face of the dead." The secretary general of AUF, himself a survivor of the attack, testified that he did not understand the neighbours' angst in regard to the memorial.

In September 2020, an injunction from Ringerike District Court blocked further construction on the memorial; in November, a higher court removed the injunction; and in February 2021 the court ruled against the opponents, finding that the benefits of the memorial outweighed the traumas it might revive.

The cost for a national memorial in Hole municipality increased more than ten-fold, previously from 40.5 million Norwegian kroner, to over 500 million including delays and legal fees.

=== Other memorials and symbols ===
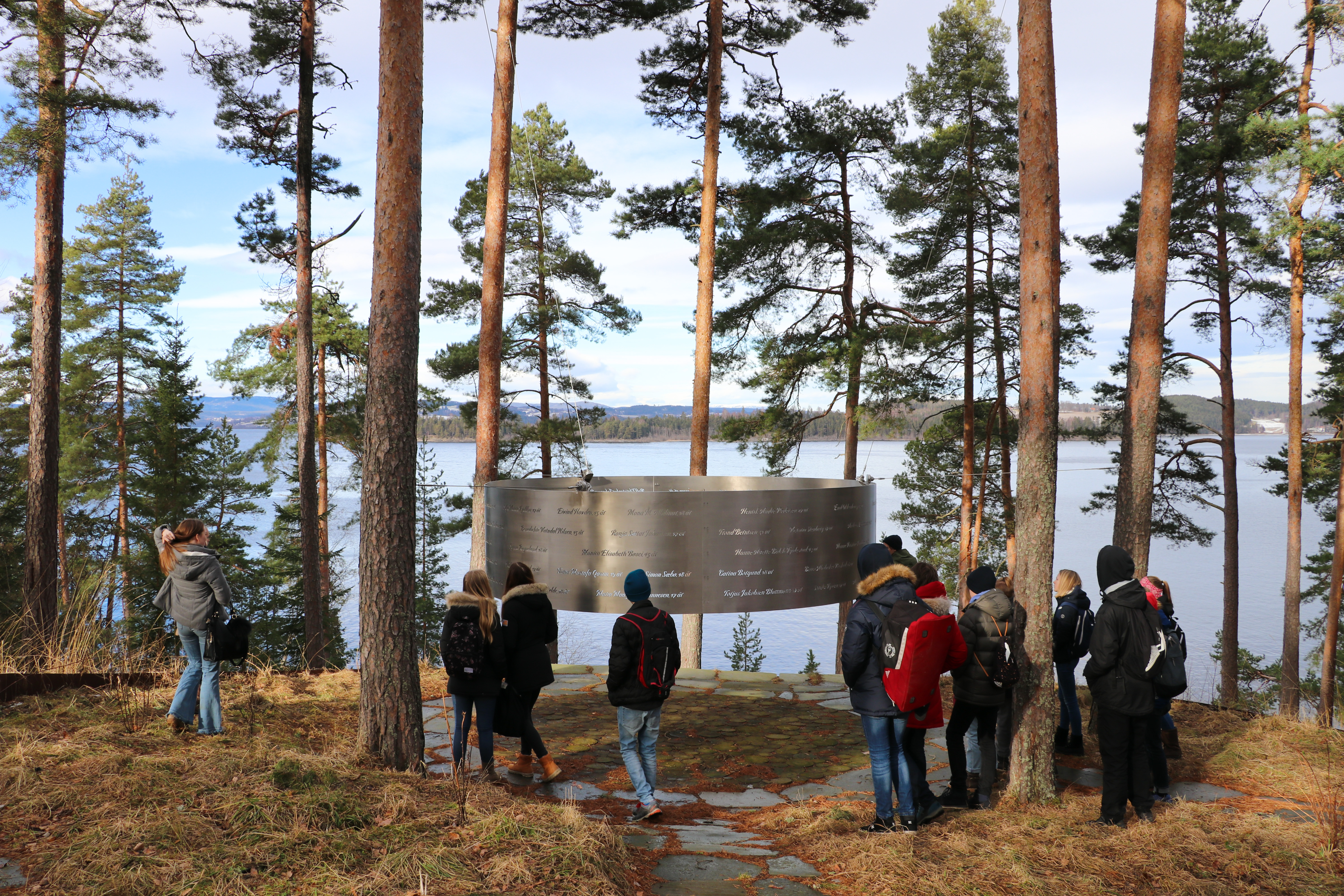
Ringen, 'The Ring' at Utøya

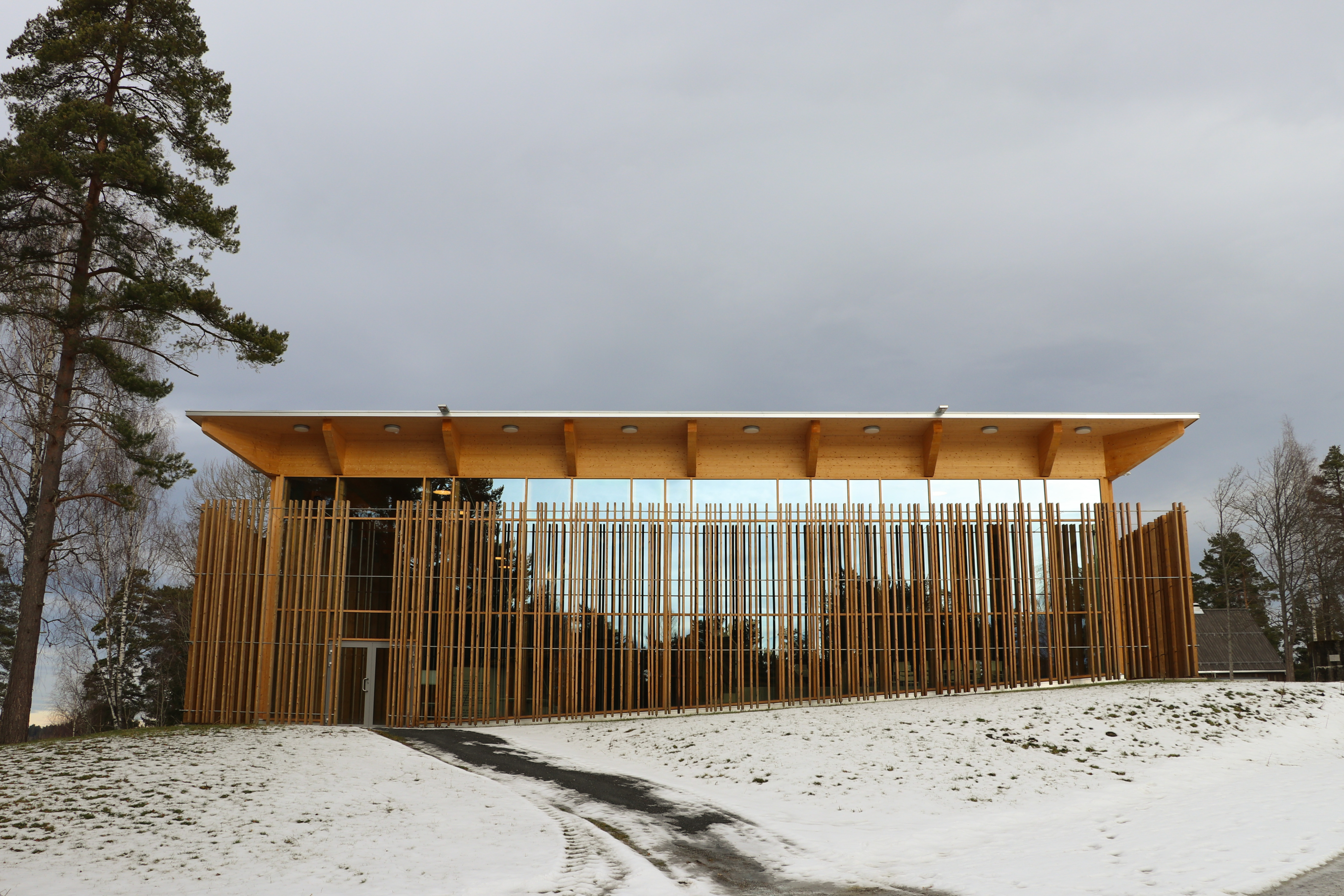
Hegnhuset, 'Safeguard House' on Utøya

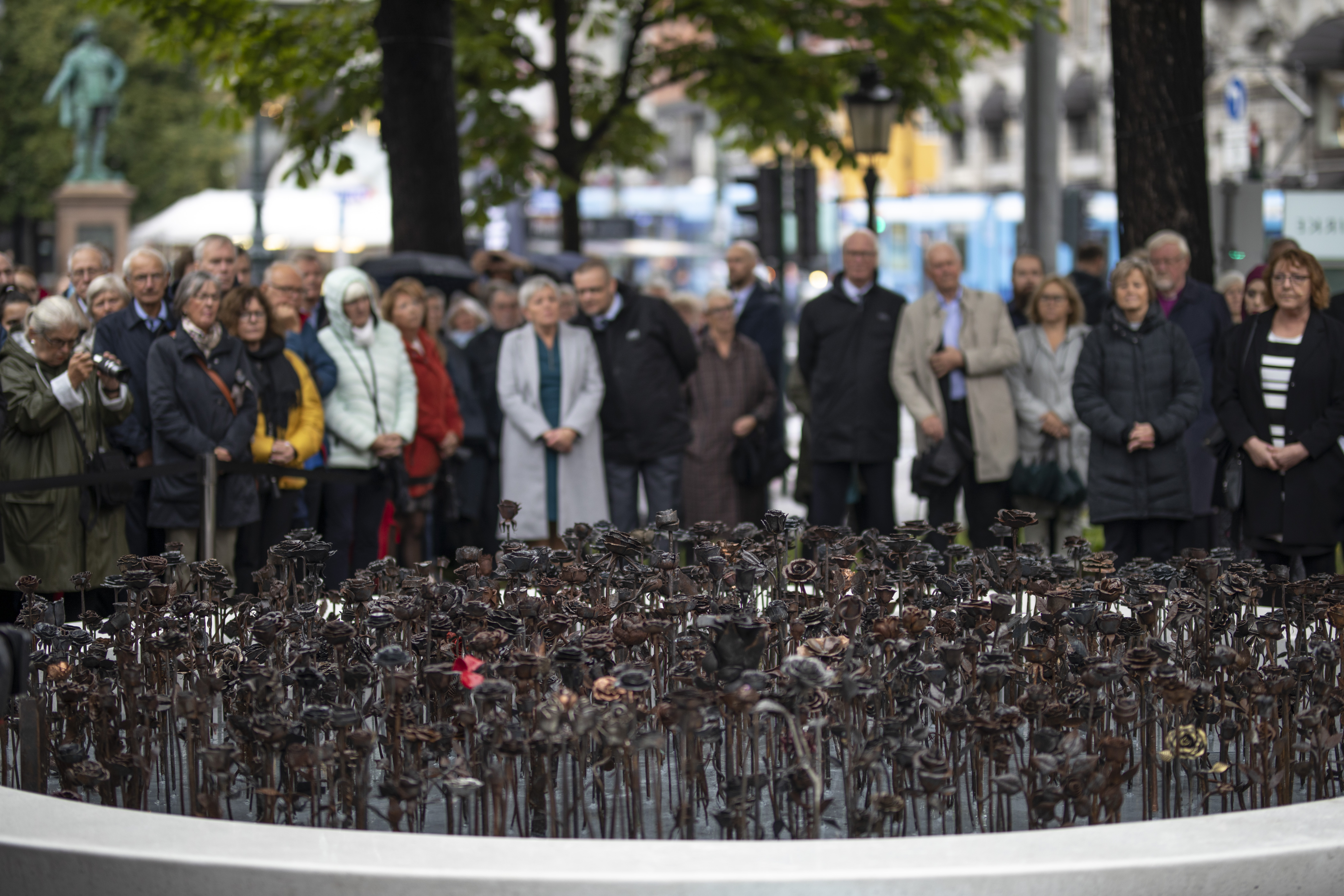
The monument, "The Iron Roses" is in the foreground

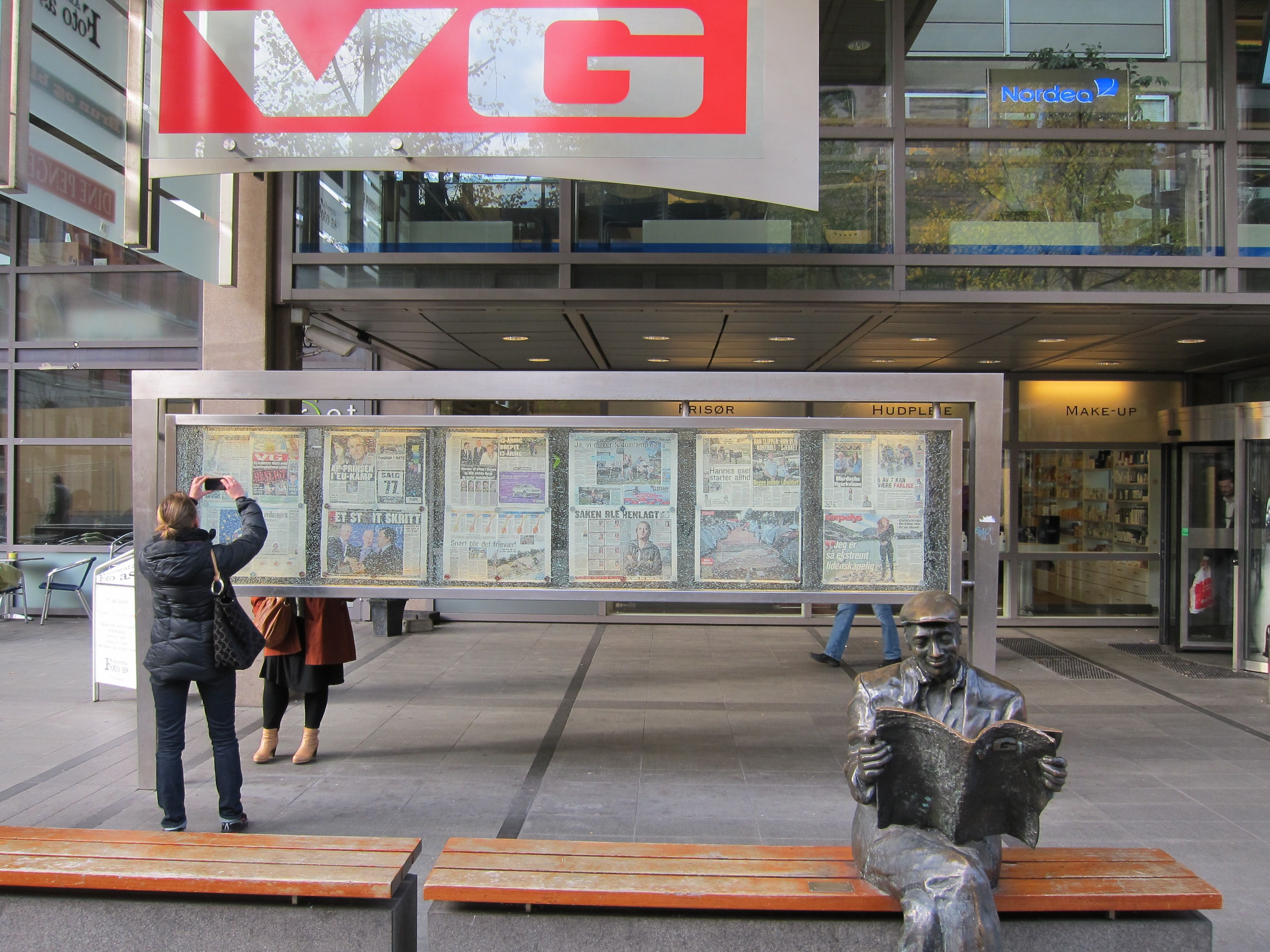
Newspaper display case damaged during the explosion

- At Utøya, the place of memorial is called Lysningen, 'The Clearing'; a part of it is Ringen, 'The Ring'—a "ring of steel [that] hangs between trees and here the names and age of the majority of those 69 killed are engraved"; "it lies at the highest point of the island"; It was unveiled during summer 2015.
- Hegnhuset was inaugurated in 2016.
- "The Iron Roses" Jernrosene is located at Domkirke-parken in Oslo. The memorial has around 900 [metal] roses; they were donated by persons in various countries; one rose was created by a survivor, and some by others who were bereaved.
- A newspaper display case that was collaterally damaged has been left unrepaired with its glass fractured but not dislocated by the shockwave of the bomb. In 2020 the display case was moved back to where it was located in 2011—outside [the building at] Akersgata 55, the headquarters of Verdens Gang. The installation is referred to by the governmental organisation KORO, as "Relocating the past: ruins for the future". Artist Ahmad Ghossein took the initiative to create a memorial from the shattered display. The newspaper edition from the day of the bombing, is still on display.
- One monolith stands in each municipality. There are memorials created by the artist Nico Widerberg in the 53 affected municipalities in Norway who welcomed the same sculpture, funded by a private donation.
- A minnestein ("memorial stone") to commemorate the attacks at Utøya is located at a roadside rest area with a view of Utøya that is located on E16 at Nes in Hole (municipality).

=== Proposed memorials ===
A monument at Stensparken in Oslo has been proposed, including metal roses. It has not been authorised, as its planned dimensions of 34 metres (112 ft) by 20 metres (66 ft), with a height of 3 metres (9.8 ft), were judged to be too overwhelming.

=== Cancelled national memorial at Sørbråten ===
As of September 2016, Hole Municipality has stopped case work regarding the request for permission to build a national monument at Sørbråten; media said that the case work could be arrested for around two and a half years or longer. The government is scheduled to be a defendant in court during a three-week trial, starting 25 April 2017; the underlying lawsuit aims to deny construction at the planned location.

Previously, in March 2016, the location for a planned national place of memorial was moved from Utøya to Sørbråten – located on the mainland 350 m (1,150 ft) from Utvika and 900 m (3,000 ft) from Utøya; in September 2014 the Hole municipal council had refused a memorial at Sørbråten. The names of several of the victims are reportedly being denied (as of 2016, by next of kin) as inscriptions on the planned monument.

A committee, Kunstutvalget for minnestaden for 22. juli, chose a design by Jonas Dahlberg for the monument, and Karin Moe has called the planned monument at Sørbråten – "Breivik's Memorial Place". Later, in a Klassekampen article Moe said that "Many of the [local] inhabitants have described [...] the design as a violation, even a rape of nature [that is in place] at Sørbråten. Such is the intensity of how the memorial is being felt, that physical pain is felt merely by imagining having to face the memorial every day. The traumatised neighbors re-live the acts of terror through the brutal cut into the mountain slope ... a reminder of who acted: Anders Behring Breivik. Here his misdeed is carved in stone. No wonder that fear lies in the reactions. ... The baffling thing for the locals is this: ... but we were supposed to be honored – not re-traumatised. Why must this incurable memorial-wound be inflicted on us, so close to [our bodies or our] life". Furthermore, she said that "Long time was needed before the September 11 memorial place on Manhattan was in place. Now an encompassing – in regard to ethics and aesthetics – pause for thinking is needed – both for the placement and the final design of the memorial". A later article suggested that "we create the monument as envisioned, but fill the scar with rock and beautify the surface", inspired by kintsugi. A later article said that "What many of us don't understand is why these plans, apparently not well-considered, now are pushed through. ... Is it [because of] prestige or out of consideration to the artist"?

Minister of Local Government and Modernisation has been criticised for announcing – while Breivik was a plaintiff in a 4-day trial – the [current] decision to construct the monument.

On 14 April 2016, media said that a "report has indicated that the place of memorial will create great mental strains on the persons living in its close proximity"; The report, Nasjonalt kunnskapssenter om vold og traumatisk stress a/s, was completed in April 2015. A later newspaper article asked "And why should the little island [sic], [Sørbråten be punished with the jötunn cut – what wrong has the island done?" On 16 April 2016 media quoted board member Anne-Gry Ruud of neighbourhood association, Utstranda Velforening: "I don't think that the work of art honors all who were killed, but symbolizes only pain and open wounds. ... If this work of art gives any associations, then they are to terror, death, pain and the inadequacy of society. ... This is not just a small cut on a point – it is an area of 1.2 decare [that will become surrounded by water]. ... I don't think that the [local] inhabitants have a responsibility to provide a location for a memorial at Sørbråten. Especially in the summer we experience a steady flow of tourists on a pilgrimage to Sørbråten. Some take selfies with Utøya in the background. Others stop the inhabitants and ask what they did that day and how we contributed. ... We have two schoolbuses that drive back and forth every day on the road just above, others pass on their way to the store, leisure activities, work or municipal centre ... 260 inhabitants".

The national convention of the Progress Party decided to say "no" to placing the memorial at Sørbråten.

On 25 April 2016 Hole Municipal Council decided to fund Norwegian kroner 25,000 to Utstranda Velforening, for a proposed lawsuit against the government.

In a 14 May 2016 Aftenposten article Stig Andersen, a film director and -producer, said that the monument of the original contest was supposed to have a price limited to Norwegian kroner 20 million; now that the government has estimated the price to 70 million including relevant extra expenses, the contestants that operated within the original price limits have been deceived.

In May 2016 the government wrote that the ongoing lawsuit about [placing] the monument [at Sørbråten], will not change the government's plans; the letter was signed by Minister of Local Government and Modernisation and Minister of Culture.

In an 11 June 2016 Dagbladet article Hans Normann Dahl was quoted, "The monument itself is incomprehensible, and the idea so crass that it contains a negative and destructive material".

An 18 June 2016 Dagbladet article quoted (writings of) one mother (Gunn Rusten) who lost her daughter: "My daughter's name will NOT be displayed on any memorial at Sørbråten, but it is displayed at Utøya". She added that "Why should all the phenomenal persons living there, and who put their lives on the line that day – to save as many as possible of those on Utøya [who were later rescued from the lake] – have this as a lifelong, daily reminder of the fateful Friday when police and those in charge let a crazy man walk around for around an hour and a half – and kill at will – without intervening". Furthermore, another mother (Mai Britt Rogne) who lost her daughter said that: "We already have the grave, [and] Utøya, and one monolith in every municipality. How many places of memorial do we need"?

On 24 June 2016 the government was sued (in Ringerike District Court) with a claim that "The government is being denied construction of the memorial Memory Wound, including a parking lot, a footpath, and auxiliary developments at Sørbråten and Bergli [both] in Hole".

As of September 2016 the government has offered to ditch the "Memory Wound" draft for a monument; the site for a national memorial at Sørbråten, remains unchanged.

Swedish psychiatrist Per-Olof Michel said "I have been thinking why the government was in such a hurry. In Sweden one will be unveiling the Tsunami Monument next year – 13 years after the fact. Regarding something that affects so many people, one should let time pass and go through things again".

Bodil Cappelen said in a Klassekampen article that "Centuries will pass ... Oh, yes. Here they have cut off a point—from the mountain mama. A landscape was not that much worth—then".

Regarding "Memory Wound" possibly being plagiarism of one of 300 candidate proposals for the pre-qualification in the contest for monument design, art historian Tommy Sørbø said that "My first impression was that this is closest [to] plagiarism"; "But when the idea is so similar, I think one should examine the case further"; [the final written work for the master's degree,] masteroppgaven, of architect students Kristin Ulrikke Rønnestad og Hildegunn Slotnæs had already been published on NTNU's website, and had been exhibited in Trondheim, and had been mailed to around 200 persons and offices. So far the case has led to: government agency KORO informing Dahlberg and the Department of Culture of potential allegations of plagiarism; Dahlberg denied any knowledge of masteroppgaven; student Rønnestad met with the director of KORO in April 2014. The lawyer (from the architects' trade union) that accompanied Rønnestad there, said that KORO showed "a quite condescending attitude towards her". Other views regarding the case includes the view of Arve Rød, art critic of Dagbladet, saying about the sketches "The likeness is peculiar, and impossible to overlook. It is difficult not to conclude that these are two completely alike ideas, but I can not from that claim that Dahlberg has plagiarized the work of the two students"; he thinks that it is quite remarkable that [two] ideas, so alike, were found in the same contest and situation, in the same place and at the same time.

In November 2016 news broke that case work regarding the request for permission to build the monument at Sørbråten, had been arrested in September; Hole municipality's justification, cited in part the upcoming court case. In June 2017 the government cancelled the project.

=== Attempts at art creation ===
A 2016 Norwegian news article said that "Most of those that work in the field of art, probably were aware of the support group's ["the national support group after the 22 July incidents", or Nasjonal støttegruppe etter 22. juli-hendelsene marked attempts at stopping the Danish playwright Christian Lollike when he wanted to stage a drama based on the terrorist's manuscript. Artists are in fact not as daring, as many like to think".

== Depiction in popular culture ==
- The poem [These memories have no time to wait] Desse minna har ikkje tid til å vente (2021), by Frode Grytten

=== Films ===
- [To the Youth] Til ungdommen (2012), directed by Kari Anne Moe
- Utøya: July 22, directed by Erik Poppe, was released in 2018.
- 22 July, directed by Paul Greengrass, was released in 2018.
- [The legacy of 22 July] Arven etter 22. juli, directed by Tommy Gulliksen (Simple English Wikipedia), was released in 2021

=== Music ===
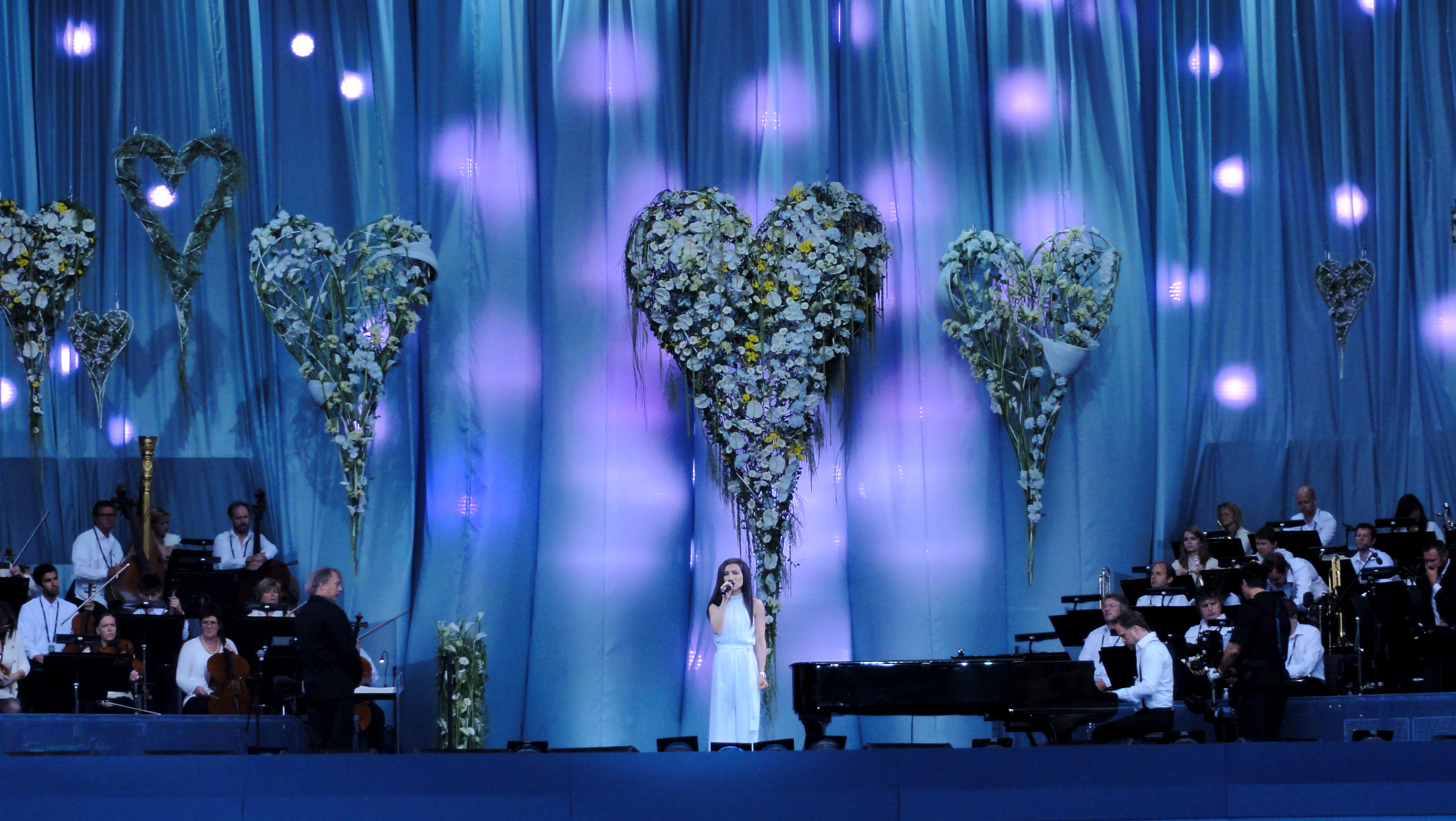
Laleh performing with the Norwegian Radio Orchestra at the National Memorial Concert 2012 in Vika in Oslo

The 2012 single "Some Die Young" by the Iranian-Swedish musician Laleh became closely associated with the national mourning process, with newspaper articles, university lectures and a number of fan videos to this effect emerging. Laleh was invited to perform as one of only two international artists at the official memorial concert in Oslo on the first anniversary of the event in 2012, and later performed the song at the 2012 Nobel Peace Prize Concert. The song went on to peak at number one in the Norwegian charts for eight weeks and was certified fourteen times platinum in the country by IFPI Norway. In a 2017 episode of Sveriges Television's music documentary series Hitlåtens historia, Laleh is invited to visit Utøya for the first time and meet survivors, reflecting on the significance her song took on as part of remembrance activities.

The Austrian black metal band Harakiri for the Sky released a song titled, "69 Dead Birds for Utøya", on their 2014 album Aokigahara.

Dutch symphonic metal band Epica released a song entitled "Internal Warfare", on their 2012 album Requiem for the Indifferent. Singer Simone Simons stated in an interview that it was about the Breivik attacks in Norway.

Norwegian pop singer Aurora released a song entitled "Little Boy in the Grass", on her 2015 EP Running with the Wolves, which is about the tragedy. One of her friends was killed during the attack on Utøya.

Norwegian singer Anette Askvik released a song entitled "Liberty", on her 2011 album Liberty, the official video for which contains images of the tragedy and the dedication, "Til Minne om ofrene etter terrorhandlingene 22.07.2011" ("In memory of the victims of the terrorist acts on 22 July 2011").

A 2016 song performed by the Norwegian pop-rock band deLillos, "Vi ser dere nå" ("We see you now"), was written about the attacks; one verse says: "he set off a bomb, to go to an island, where he gunned down youth, as if it was fun".

=== Television ===
Season 6 of Seconds from Disaster premiered on the one-year anniversary of the 2011 Norway attacks (aired 22 July 2012), with the episode titled, "Norway Massacre: I Was There".

The Futurama episode "The Cryonic Woman" was briefly changed on some syndicated reruns, including the DVD rerelease, because a moment in the episode included a screen saying "Prime Minister of Norway". This was later changed to "Chainsaw Juggler".

A TV miniseries, 22. juli (TV series), about the respondents to the attack premiered on NRK 5 January 2020.

== See also ==
- Timeline of the 2011 Norway attacks
- 22 July Information Centre, the government enquiry into the attacks
- List of rampage killers (religious, political, or ethnic crimes)
- Right-wing terrorism
- 2019 Christchurch shootings, a mass shooting in New Zealand partly inspired by the Norway attacks
- 2019 Bærum murder and mosque attack
- 2022 Buffalo shooting, a mass shooting in the United States also inspired by the Norway and Christchurch attacks
