= Christian Lollike =

Danish playwright and theatre director

- Born: 20 April 1973; Copenhagen, Denmark
- Occupations: Playwright, theatre director
- Writing career
- Language: Danish
- Notable work: Manifesto 2083
- Website: Christian Lollike; Sort/Hvid

Christian Lollike (born 20 April 1973) is a Danish playwright, theater director and artistic director of Sort/Hvid (formerly Café Teatret) in Copenhagen. Lollike is working with stage and installation art in theaters, public areas and virtual platforms. He has made theater, film, musicvideo, opera, dance and art interventions. He often uses current political events in his work.

== Career ==
Lollike studied playwrighting at Danish National School of Performing Arts in Aarhus in 2001. He had his debut as playwright at Aarhus Teater with Operation: Louise and Ferdinand in 2002. In 2005 he became resident playwright and director at Aarhus Theater. Here he, among other things, created the play Nathan (without title), that was written for Aarhus Cathedral.

In 2009 he became leader of playwrighting at Danish National School of Performing Arts together with Mads Thygesen.

In July 2011 he took up the position as artistic director of Café Teatret (now Sort/Hvid) in Copenhagen. He has also written the play The Normal Life, that has been performed in i.a. Germany, Austria and Sweden, and the plays The wonder - the re-mohammed-ty show and Cosmic Fear, that has been performed in France and Quebec, Canada. In addition The wonder - the re-mohammed-ty show was produced for Danish Radio Drama.

In 2012 Lollike got a lot of media coverage with the play Manifesto 2083, that is based directly on Anders Behring Breivik's manifesto in relation to the terrorist attack in Oslo, the 2011 Norway attacks.

Lollikes reinterpretation of the classic Danish play Erasmus Montanus by Ludvig Holberg was performed first at Aarhus Theater in 2017 and was later restaged at Østre Gasværk Teater in Copenhagen in 2018. and at Den nationale scene, Norway.

== Honours ==
Christian Lollike has been nominated several times for awards, of which he has won several of them, including a Reumert in 2009 as Playwright of the Year for Cosmic Fear and three Reumert Prizes in 2013: Playwright of the Year for Skakten, Manifesto 2083 and Kagefabrikken, The Jury's Special Award for Manifesto 2083 and Performance of the Year for Skakten. In 2016, Christian Lollike received Teaterporkalen for his work with Living Dead. In 2017 Lollike's critically acclaimed adaptation of Erasmus Montanus received three Reumert Awards.. These include Theater Performance of the Year 2017, Male Leading Role of the Year 2017, and Stage Design of the Year 2017. The same year Living Dead received the Reumert Jury's special Prize.

== Works ==
- Blindness, Sort/Hvid (teater), Aarhus Teater and Teater Momentum
- DON JUAN, Sort/Hvid (teater), 2019
- Erasmus Montanus, Østre Gasværk 2019
- Aladdin, or The wonderful lamp, Royal Danish Theatre 2018
- White Nigger, Black Madonna, Sort/Hvid (teater) 2018
- Revolution, Aarhus Teater og Sort/Hvid (teater) 2018
- Hospital, Aarhus Teater og 2018
- Erasmus Montanus, Århus Teater 2017
- Living Dead, Århus Teater and Sort/Hvid 2016
- Uropa, Royal Danish Theatre and Sort/Hvid, 2016
- We are not real, Sort/Hvid and Aarhus Festuge, 2015
- Leaves, Sort/Hvid and Copenhagen Opera Festival, 2015
- The Provocateur, Sort/Hvid, 2015
- In Contact, Sort/Hvid and Corpus, The Royal Danish Ballet, 2014
- The Puppet Party 2014-2015
- The Apostles of Nationalism, 2014
- All My Dreams Come True, CaféTeatret og Aarhus Teater 2013
- Kagefabrikken, Det Kgl. Teater 2013
- The Shaft or Gerhards adventure, CaféTeatret og Aarhus Teater 2013
- Manifesto 2083, CaféTeatret og Dramatikkens Hus, Oslo 2012
- Project Farming, CaféTeatret 2012
- The Normal Life, CaféTeatret og Aarhus Teater 2011
- Romeo & Julie, Aarhus Teater 2010
- The History of the Future, The Royal Danish Theater and Aarhus Teater 2009
- Undskyld, gamle, hvor finder jeg tiden, kærligheden og den galskab der smitter...?
- The Meat Carousel, Aarhus Teater (2009)
- Cosmic fear or the day Brad Pitt got Paranoia, Aarhus Teater 2008
- Nathan (without titel), Aarhus Teater 2007
- Grace was here, dramatization of von Triers Dogville, Kaleidoskop 2007
- Suicide Service, Aarhus Teater 2006 (nominated for a Reumert prize as Best Dramatist)
- Himlen over os, Edison 2005
- The wonder – the re-Mohammed-ty show, Katapult and radio play, DR 2005
- Afrikas Stjerne, Bådteatret 2004
- Faust og Reklamekabaretten, Aarhus Teater 2004
- Sexy Sally, Katapult 2004
- Pas på din lænestol!, DR 2003, radio play
- Operation: Luise og Ferdinand, Aarhus Teater 2002, (nominated for a Reumert Prize as Best Dramatist)
- Gensyn i Braunau, Midtvejsprojekt 1999
