= Sort/Hvid =

Theater in Copenhagen, Denmark

Coordinates: 55°40′50″N 12°34′34″E

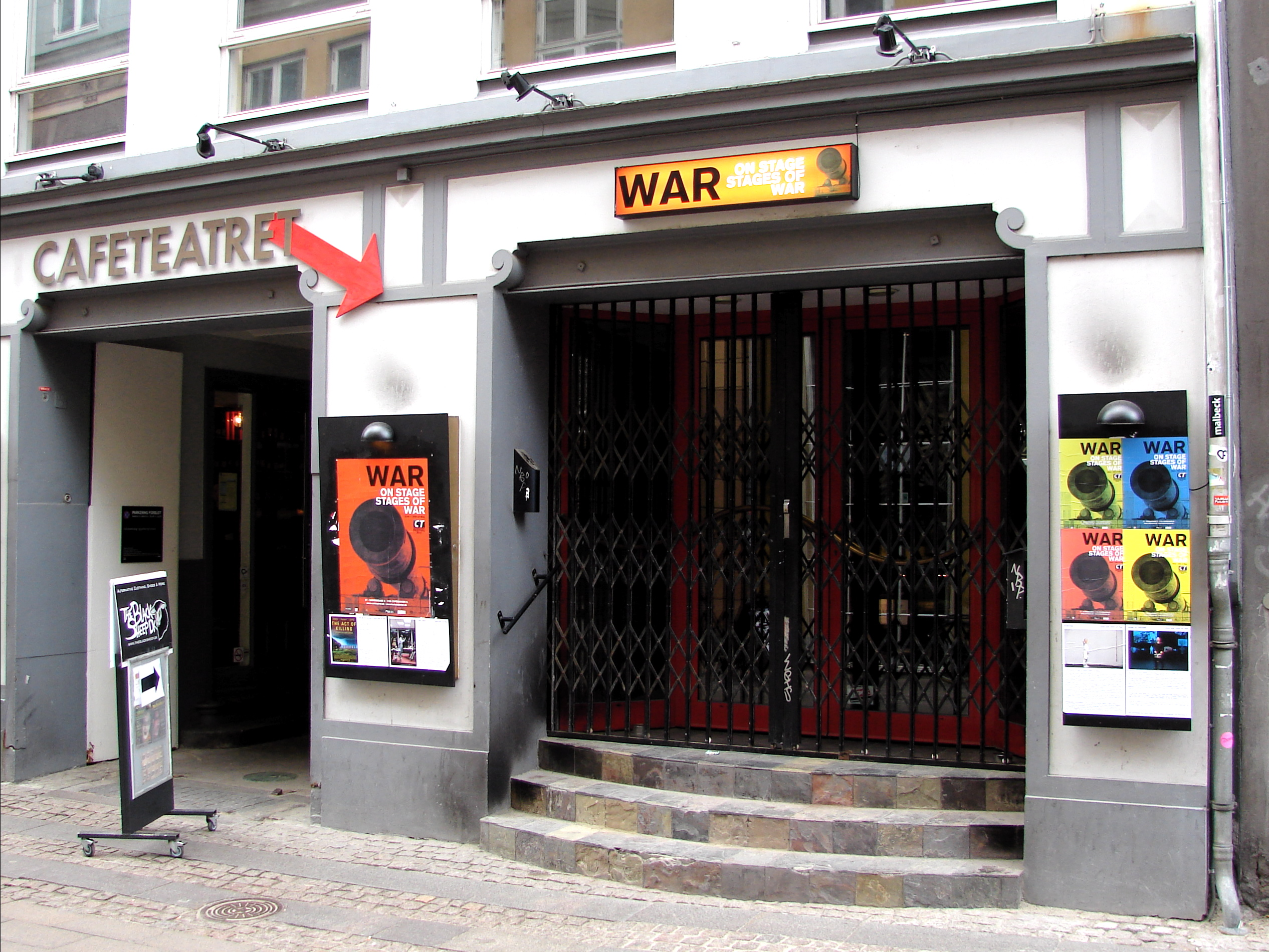
Café Teatret, 2013

Sort/Hvid (lit. 'Black/White'), formerly Café Teatret, is a theatre in Copenhagen, Denmark. It is located at Staldgade 26-30 in Kødbyen. The company stages new Danish plays as well as Danish premieres of foreign plays, usually between four and eight productions per season.

== History ==
Café Teatret was established in 1972, located in Skindergade, Copenhagen.

In 2011, Christian Lollike joined as artistic director with the ambition to create contemporary performing arts and a theatre with an international outreach.

In May 2014, the theatre changed its name to Sort/Hvid. Around six months later, there was a fire in the theatre, and the building was permanently damaged.

With support from the City of Copenhagen, private foundations, companies, and private individuals, and after crowdfunding attracted DKK258,439 from 345 supporters for new equipment, Sort/Hvid was relocated in a new, larger theatre built in 2016 in Kødbyen (Meatpacking District) in the heart of Vesterbro, Copenhagen. The new theatre opened in 2017.

== Notable productions ==
The company attracted international attention and controversy in January 2012 when it announced its plans to stage a play based on the manifesto by Anders Behring Breivik, written by Christian Lollike. The play, Manifesto 2083, premiered on 15 October 2012 and was performed to 16 November and again in January 2013, as well as in Oslo and at other venues.

The play was awarded the jury's special prize during the Reumert Awards in 2013. At the same awards, the company's play Slakten (The Family) received the prize for best play of the year, and Christian Lollike received best playwright of the year award.
