= Vegard Wennesland =

Norwegian politician

Vegard Grøslie Wennesland (born 14 December 1983) is a Norwegian politician for the Labour Party.

In the general election in 2013, he was elected deputy representative to the Storting (the Norwegian parliament) from Oslo. Wennesland met for two weeks as a regular representative before the cabinet change in October 2013.

In 2011, he survived the Utøya massacre. He became leader of the Oslo Workers' Youth League (Oslo AUF) in August 2011, succeeding Håvard Vederhus who was killed.
