= 22 July Information Centre =

Museum in Oslo, Norway

Coordinates: 59.9159°N 10.7427°E

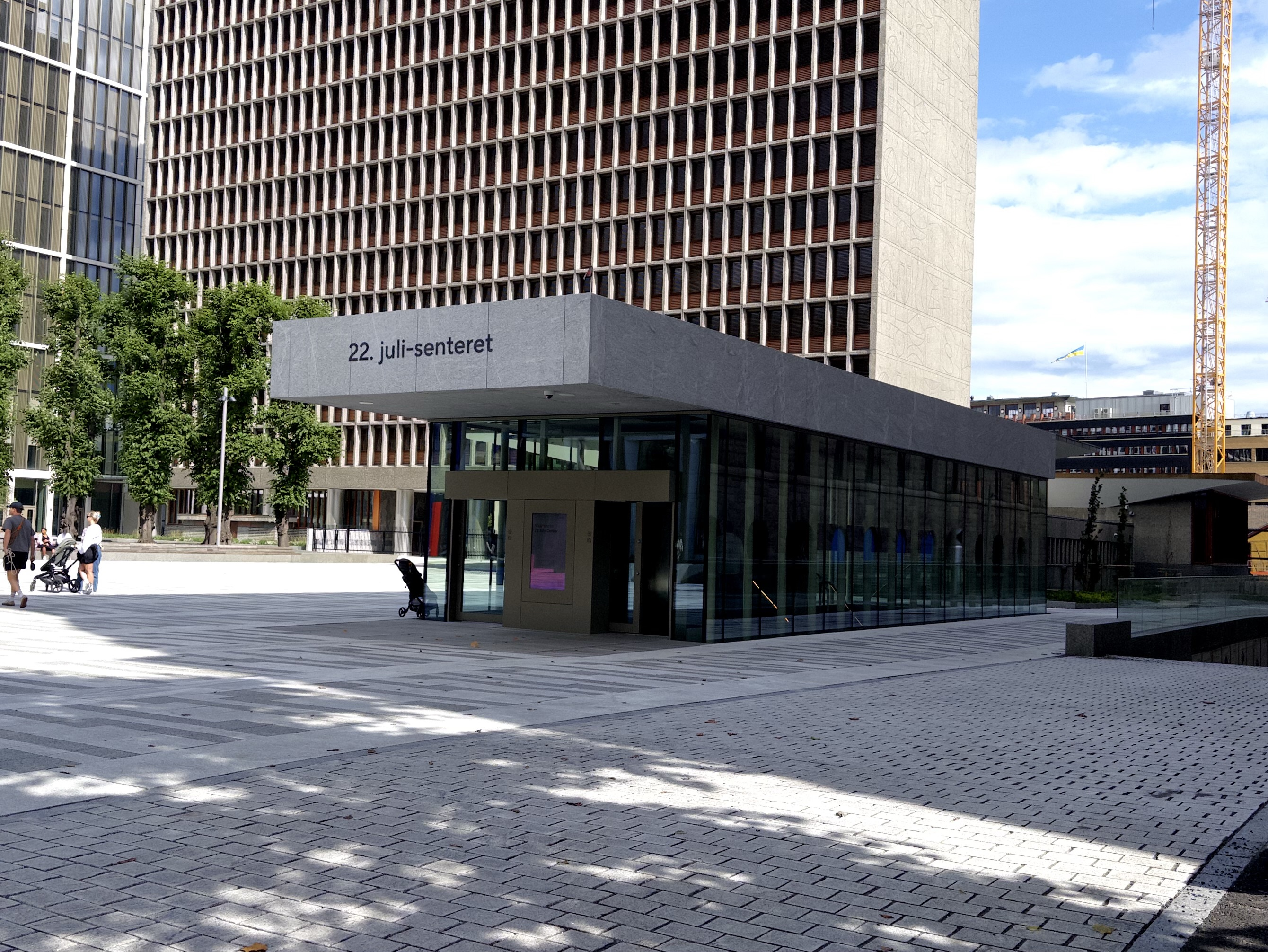
The building

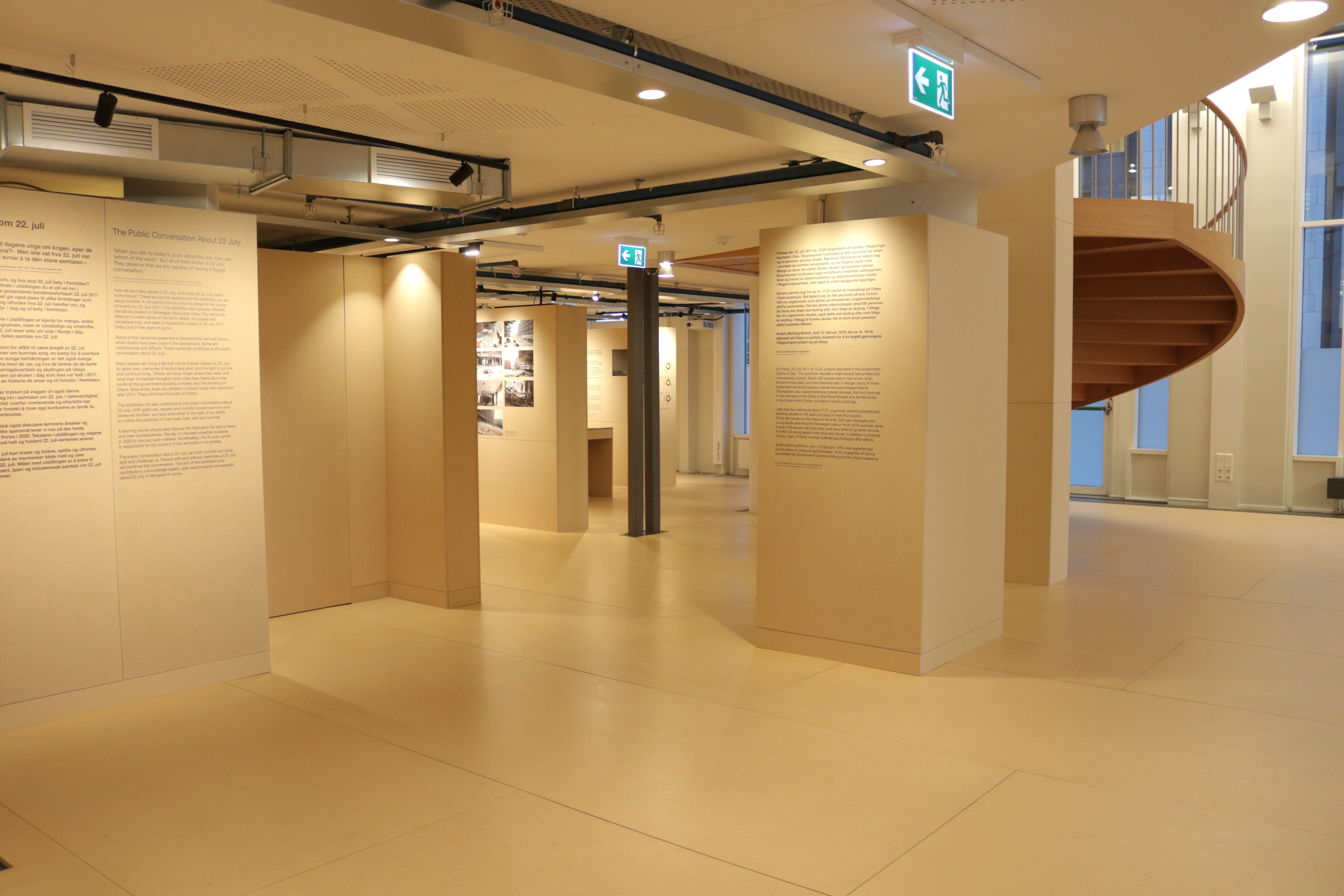
The permanent exhibition at Teatergata 10, titled The Public Conversation About 22 July.

The 22 July Centre (Norwegian: 22. juli-senteret) is a learning centre in Norway that works with the mediation of memory and knowledge about the terror attacks in Oslo and on Utøya on 22 July 2011.

The centre was opened on 22 July 2015, at the ground floor of the high-rise building in Regjeringskvartalet of Oslo, and was temporarily moved to Teatergata 10 in 2020 due to renovation work in the government building complex. The 22 July Centre is located at Teatergata 10, in the government building complex in central Oslo. The permanent exhibition is titled The Public Conversation About 22 July. The exhibition contains a timeline of the terror attack that took place on 22 July 2011, as well as seven narratives about 22 July. With these narratives the Centre aims to broaden the conversation about the attacks today and in the years to follow.

The centre is open every day except Mondays.
