= Margreth Olin =

Norwegian filmmaker

- Born: Margreth Olin Mykløen; April 16, 1970 (age 55); Stranda Municipality, Norway
- Known for: Film director

Margreth Olin Mykløen (born April 16, 1970) is a Norwegian film director, screenwriter, and film producer. She is educated at the University of Bergen and Volda University College. She is best known for her documentaries, in which she highlights the weak in society. She has received many national and international awards for her work.

== Biography ==
Olin made her directorial debut with the school production In the House of Love (1995). In 1998 her first full-length documentary In the House of Angels was released theatrically in Norway. It later received many awards, among them the Amanda for the best documentary. Her breakthrough came with the film My body which also won the Amanda. It won The Golden Chair and the Audience award at the Norwegian short-film festival in Grimstad. My body created a big debate in the media. It won awards abroad where it participated at numerous festivals. Among them it was nominated and given a diploma at the Silver Wolf competition IDFA (2002).

Raw Youth has been seen by more than 60.000 at Norwegian cinemas and was nominated for the European Film Award, best documentary (2005). In 2006, she made herself known by being the initiator of the action called "Nestekjærlighet-aksjonen". When she resumed action two years later in protest against new asylum restrictions, she was named Norwegian of the Year 2008 by the weekly magazine Ny Tid.

In the autumn of 2009, she received attention for her debut as a feature film director with The Angel. This film became the Norwegian Oscar contribution in 2010. Nowhere Home (2012), about unaccompanied minor asylum seekers, created debate in Norway and was shown at a number of festivals and conferences abroad. Olin is one of six directors in Wim Wenders' Cathedrals of Culture (2013), where she directed the episode from the Oslo Opera House, with a premiere at the Berlinale (2014).

Doing Good (2016) was seen by 170.000 in cinemas, which is the second most of documentaries shown in cinemas. She has also launched the documentary Childhood (2017). Her latest film Self Portrait (2020) has won seven awards internationally.

== Filmography ==
- In the House of Love (1994)
- My Uncle (1997)
- In The House of Angels (1998)
- The Seven Deadly Sins (2000) (directed the part Gluttony)
- My body (2002)
- Raw Youth (2004)
- Lullaby (2006)
- Angel (2009)
- Nowhere Home (2012)
- Cathedrals of Culture (2013) (directed the episode about Opera House in Oslo)
- Doing Good (2016)
- Childhood (2017)
- Isolation Row (2018)
- Self Portrait (2020)
- Songs of Earth (2023)
