= Roger Andresen =

Norwegian police officer

Roger Andresen (born 1951) is a Norwegian police officer who has been the deputy police chief and leader of the public order department of Oslo Police District since 1995.

In 2011 Andresen was investigated by the special unit for police matters suspected of incompetence with regards to the handling of the Nygaard case. Andresen was found not guilty, but the investigation confirmed that many tactical and juridical mistakes were done.

Andresen was the acting police chief in Oslo during the 2011 Norway attacks (Anders Breivik).

As deputy chief, he was in many years the boss of Eirik Jensen, a senior police officer in Oslo. Jensen, who in 2017 was sentenced to 21 years of prison for aggravated corruption, narcotics trade, and possession of illegal weapons. Andresen was called as a witness by the defense and testified that he was not aware of any corruption surrounding Jensen.
