= Anette Askvik =

- Born: 7 May 1983 (age 42); Stavanger, Norway
- Genres: pop, art pop
- Occupations: Musician, songwriter, composer
- Instruments: Vocals, piano
- Years active: 2011–present
- Labels: Bird
- Website: www.anetteaskvik.com

Anette Askvik (born 7 May 1983 in Stavanger, Norway) is a Norwegian songwriter, composer, pianist, and vocalist. She released her first album in 2011 and her second in 2016. She lives in Oslo, Norway, where she writes, records, and runs her record label, Bird.

== Early years ==
After growing up in Stavanger, Norway, she moved to Australia and spent the next three years studying music in Brisbane (2006–2009) [.

== Works ==
Askvik recorded her debut album, Liberty, in Oslo with producer Øystein Sevåg. It was released in 2011 on her own label, Bird, which she had formed in 2010.. After releasing Liberty, she toured Germany, England, France and the United States.

Since 2011, Askvik worked on her next album. Her first single "Supernova" was released in November 2015, along with a music video.

She composed music for several documentaries for the Norwegian broadcasting corporation channel NRK, including the prize-winning documentary 22.07.

Askivik worked with musicians such as Audun Erlien (bass), Rune Arnesen (drums) og Petter Wettre (saxophone). Askvik's music is a mix of pop and jazz.

== Reception ==
The Norwegian outlet "Musikknyheter.no" wrote that Askvik's music sounds like "a mix between Ane Brun and Beth Gibbons".
Nordic Spotlight, another online publicist focusing on Nordic music, wrote that "There’s a touch of Björk in the vocal mannerisms of Norwegian singer/songwriter Anette Askvik".

== Discography ==
Anette Askvik discography
- Studio albums: 5
- Singles: 1
- Music videos: 1

=== Albums ===
- 2006: Roses (Self Release)
- 2011: Liberty (Bird Records)
- 2016: Multiverse (Bird Records)
- 2023: With Every Cell (Bird Records)
- 2023: Lyden Av Snø (Bird Records)

=== Singles ===
- 2015: Supernova
