= Jonas Dahlberg =

Swedish artist (born 1970)

- Born: 1970 (age 55–56); Uddevalla, Sweden
- Education: Malmö Art Academy and School of Architecture, Lunds University
- Known for: Video art, Art & Architecture
- Movement: Video Art, Contemporary Art

Jonas Dahlberg (born 1970, Uddevalla) is a Swedish artist who lives in Stockholm, Sweden. He is mostly known for his video installation work. One of his more notorious works involved placing surveillance cameras in toilets.

Jonas Dahlberg studied architecture at Lunds University from 1993 to 1995. From 1995 to 2000 he studied art at Malmö Art Academy where he received his M.F.A. in 2000. Since 2000 he has developed a series of videos that primarily consist of slow movements through architectural spaces. The videos are created by building miniaturized architectural sets that are filmed through experimental methods. In addition to video and video installation, his practice includes public art works, sculptures, commissions, book projects and photography.

Exhibitions include: Milch, London (2001), Index Foundation Stockholm (2001), Manifesta 4 Frankfurt (2002), Italian Pavilion at 50th Biennale di Venezia (2003), National representative for Sweden at 26th Bienal de São Paulo (2004), Momentum 04 Moss (2004), Modern Museum Stockholm (2005), Marian Goodman Paris (2005), FRAC Dijon (2006), Taipei Biennal (2006), Leeum Museum of Art Seoul (2007) Kunsthalle Wien (2008), Kunstmuseum Stuttgart (2009), Galerie Nordenhake (2010, 2008, 2006, 2004) The Lisbon Architecture Triennale (2010), Prospect II New Orleans Biennial (2011).
