= Marcel Gleffe =

German living in Norway (born 1979)

Marcel Gleffe (born 1979) is a German living in Norway who saved the lives of several people during the 2011 Norway attacks on the island of Utøya. He became known in Germany as the "Saviour of Utøya" (Retter von Utøya). He was awarded the Officer's Cross of the Order of Merit of the Federal Republic of Germany.

== Early life ==
From March 1999 to July 2000, Gleffe was a conscript, serving in the air defences of the German army. He extended his military service to take part in a deployment to Kosovo. He left the Bundeswehr as a Hauptgefreiter der Reserve.

He has lived in Siggerud, Norway, since 2008.

== Utøya massacre ==
On 22 July 2011, during the attack on the island of Utøya, he saved lives by departing the pier at Utvika (when he heard shots being fired at Utøya) with his motor boat (for 6 people, model "Pioner 15"), and throwing life vests to fleeing swimmers while heading for Utøya, and picking up refugees of the massacre. He came within 20–30 meters of the shore of the island, after having seen the killer in the vicinity of the island's pump house. He loaded up his boat 5 times, before police requested him to stop what he was doing. By then he had pulled 20–25 people from the water.

== Honours ==
On 27 September 2011, Gleffe was awarded the Ehrenabzeichen in Gold by the Verband der Reservisten der Deutschen Bundeswehr. One day later, he received the media prize, the Goldene Henne, and on 4 October 2011 he received the Officer's Cross of the Order of Merit of the Federal Republic of Germany. On 15 June 2012, Gleffe was awarded the Norwegian Medal for Heroic Deeds in silver.

The Norwegian magazine Ny Tid voted Gleffe as "Norwegian of the year 2011" (together with Synnøve Kvamme and Prableen Kaur). His award was given for "by risking his own life, he placed himself as the first on the scene with a boat to save members of AUF who were swimming for their lives, away from death."
