= List of police districts in Norway =

There are twelve police districts in Norway. The Norwegian Police Service provides police services across the Kingdom of Norway. The size and number of police districts has varied over time. The most recent police reform was in 2016 which created the current police districts.

== Current structure ==
Police District	Headquarters	Notes
Oslo Police District	Oslo	Covers the municipalities of Oslo, Asker, and Bærum.
East Police District	Ski	Covers all of Østfold county and most of Akershus county except for Asker and Bærum (part of Oslo Police District), Lunner (part of Innlandet Police District), and Jevnaker (part of Southeast Police District).
Innlandet Police District	Hamar	Covers all of Innlandet county plus Lunner Municipality in Akershus county.
Southeast Police District	Tønsberg	Covers all of Buskerud, Telemark, and Vestfold counties plus Jevnaker Municipality from Akershus county.
Agder Police District	Kristiansand	Covers all of Agder county except for Sirdal Municipality (part of West Police District)
Southwest Police District	Stavanger	Covers all of Rogaland county plus Sveio, Etne, Bømlo, Fitjar, and Stord municipalities in Vestland county.
West Police District	Bergen	Covers all of Vestland county except for Sveio, Etne, Bømlo, Fitjar, and Stord municipalities (part of Southwest Police District).
Møre og Romsdal Police District	Ålesund	Covers all of Møre og Romsdal county.
Trøndelag Police District	Trondheim	Covers all of Trøndelag county plus Bindal Municipality in Nordland county.
Nordland Police District	Bodø	Covers all of Nordland county except Bindal Municipality (part of Trøndelag Police District) and also includes Gratangen Municipality in Troms county.
Troms Police District	Tromsø	Covers all of Troms county except Gratangen Municipality (part of Nordland Police District).
Finnmark Police District	Kirkenes	Covers all of Finnmark county.

== History ==
=== 2002-2016 divisions ===
The following is a list of police districts in Norway. It lists the head office location, the chief of police, the number of employees (2011), the number of rural and location stations, the population the district covers and the area it covers, including important non-Schengen Area borders.

List of former police districts
Police district	Head office	Chief of police	Empl.	Loc.	Pop.	Notes	Ref
Agder	Kristiansand	Kirsten Lindeberg	676	27	280,000	Covers Aust-Agder and Vest-Agder counties except Sirdal Municipality	
Asker and Bærum	Sandvika	Torodd Veiding	352	2	170,000	Covers Asker Municipality and Bærum Municipality in Akershus county	
Central Hålogaland	Harstad	Elisabeth Kaas	284	17	120,000	Covers the Lofoten, Ofoten and Vesterålen districts of Nordland county (Narvik, Tysfjord, Lødingen, Tjeldsund, Evenes, Ballangen, Flakstad, Vestvågøy, Vågan, Hadsel, Bø, Øksnes, Sortland, Andøy, Moskenes) and southern parts of Troms county (Harstad, Kvæfjord, Skånland, Bjarkøy, Ibestad, Gratangen, Lavangen, Salangen)	
Follo	Ski		332	2	180,000	Covers the Follo district of Akershus county (Vestby, Ski, Ås, Frogn, Nesodden, Oppegård, Enebakk) and the inner parts of Østfold county (Trøgstad, Spydeberg, Askim, Eidsberg, Skiptvet, Høbol)	
Gudbrandsdal	Lillehammer	Arne Hammersmark	156	9	70,000	Covers the Gudbrandsdalen district of Oppland county (Lillehammer, Dovre, Lesja, Skjåk, Lom, Vågå, Nord-Fron, Sel, Sør-Fron, Ringebu, Øyer, Gausdal)	
Haugaland and Sunnhordland	Haugesund	Kaare Songstad	281	12	150,000	Covers the district of Haugalandet in Rogaland county (Haugesund, Suldal, Sauda, Bokn, Tysvær, Karmøy, Utsira, Vindafjord) and the Sunnhordland district of Hordaland county (Etne, Sveio, Bømlo, Stord, Fitjar)	
Hedmark	Hamar		429	21	190,000	Covers all of Hedmark county	
Helgeland	Mosjøen	Håvard Fjærli	214	11	75,000	Covers the Helgeland district of Nordland county (Sømna, Brønnøy, Vega, Vevelstad, Herøy, Alstahaug, Leirfjord, Vefsn, Grane, Hattfjelldal, Dønna, Nesna, Hemnes, Rana, Lurøy, Træna)	
Hordaland	Bergen	Geir Gudmundsen	989	15	450,000	Covers most of Hordaland county (except for the Sunnhordland district), plus Gulen Municipality and Solund Municipality in Sogn og Fjordane county	
Nord-Trøndelag	Steinkjer	Trond Prytz	303	22	140,000	Covers Nord-Trøndelag county plus Bindal Municipality (from Nordland county) and Osen Municipality and Roan Municipality (from Sør-Trøndelag county). This area included Trondheim Airport, Værnes	
Nordmøre and Romsdal	Kristiansund		258	14	110,000	Covers the Nordmøre and Romsdal districts of Møre og Romsdal county (Molde, Kristiansund, Rauma, Nesset, Midsund, Sandøy, Aukra, Fræna, Eide, Averøy, Gjemnes, Tingvoll, Sunndal, Surnadal, Rindal, Halsa, Smøla, Aure)	
Northern Buskerud	Hønefoss	Sissel Hammer	184	11	80,000	Covers northern Buskerud county (Ringerike, Hole, Flå, Nes, Gol, Hemsedal, Ål, Hol, Sigdal, Krødsherad, Modum, Nore og Uvdal) plus Jevnaker Municipality in Oppland county	
Oslo	Oslo	Hans Sverre Sjøvold	2,517	5	570,000	Covers Oslo Municipality. Also responsible for the police helicopter service, the Emergency Response Unit and other national units.	
Rogaland	Stavanger	Hans Vik	738	18	320,000	Covers most of Rogaland county (except for the Haugalandet district) plus Sirdal Municipality in Vest-Agder county. Responsible for the Joint Rescue Coordination Centre of Southern Norway and the continental shelf	
Romerike	Lillestrøm	Jørgen L. Høidahl	651	11	250,000	Covers the Romerike district of Akershus county (Aurskog-Høland, Sørum, Fet, Rælingen, Lørenskog, Skedsmo, Nittedal, Gjerdrum, Ullensaker, Nes, Eidsvoll, Nannestad, Hurdal), including Oslo Airport, Gardermoen	
Salten	Bodø	Geir Ove Heir	195	11	85,000	Covers the Salten district of Nordland county (Bodø, Rødøy, Meløy, Gildeskål, Beiarn, Saltdal, Fauske, Sørfold, Steigen, Hamarøy) plus two municipalities in Lofoten (Røst and Værøy). Responsible for the Joint Rescue Coordination Centre of Northern Norway	
Sogn og Fjordane	Florø	Johan Brekke	212	24	105,000	Covers most of Sogn og Fjordane county (except Gulen Municipality and Solund Municipality) plus Vanylven Municipality in Møre og Romsdal county	
Sunnmøre	Ålesund		250	12	140,000	Covers the Sunnmøre district of Møre og Romsdal county (Ålesund, Sande, Herøy, Ulstein, Hareid, Volda, Ørstad, Ørskog, Norddal, Stranda, Stordal, Sykkylven, Skodje, Sula, Giske, Haram, Vestnes)	
Southern Buskerud	Drammen		455	15	205,000	Covers southern Buskerud county (Drammen, Kongsberg, Øvre Eiker, Nedre Eiker, Lier, Røyken, Hurum, Flesberg, Rollag), plus Svelvik Municipality and Sande Municipality in Vestfold county	
Sør-Trøndelag	Trondheim	Nils Kristian Moe	624	20	290,000	Covers all of Sør-Trøndelag county except for Roan Municipality and Osen Municipality	
Telemark	Skien	Anne Rygh Pedersen	408	17	170,000	Covers all of Telemark county	
Troms	Tromsø	Ole Bredrup Sæverud	338	11	120,000	Covers most of Troms county except for the Central Hålogaland district	
Vestfold	Tønsberg	Marie Benedicte Bjørnland	500	8	210,000	Covers most of Vestfold county (except for Svelvik Municipality and Sande Municipality), including Sandefjord Airport, Torp	
Western Finnmark	Hammerfest	Torbjørn Aas	142	8	45,000	Covers western Finnmark county (Hammerfest, Kautokeino, Alta, Loppa, Hasvik, Kvalsund, Måsøy, Nordkapp, Porsanger)	
Western Oppland	Gjøvik		230	12	105,000	Covers the Vestoppland and Valdres districts of Oppland county (Gjøvik, Østre Toten, Vestre Toten, Lunner, Gran, Søndre Land, Nordre Land, Sør-Aurdal, Etnedal, Nord-Aurdal, Vestre Slidre, Øystre Slidre, Vang)	
Eastern Finnmark	Kirkenes	Ellen Katrine Hætta	165	10	30,000	Covers eastern Finnmark county (Vardø, Vadsø, Karasjok, Lebesby, Gamvik, Berlevåg, Tana, Nesseby, Båtsfjord, Sør-Varanger), including the Norway–Russia border and the Reindeer Police	
Østfold	Sarpsborg	Beate Gangås	610	10	225,000	Covers the outer part of Østfold county (Halden, Moss, Sarpsborg, Fredrikstad, Hvaler, Aremark, Marker, Rømskog, Rakkestad, Råde, Rygge, Våler)	

=== Pre-2002 divisions ===
The following is a list of police districts prior to the 2002 reform. The list further contains 1999 data regarding the population, number of employees, criminal cases and budget in million Norwegian krone. The list also includes former police stations (politikamre).

List of former police districts
Police district	Head office	Pop.	Empl.	Cases	Budget	Other police stations
Arendal	Arendal	93,500	183	10,347	73	Grimstad, Risør
Asker and Bærum	Sandvika	149,200	324	16,832	128	Asker
Bergen	Bergen (city)	226,000	599	24,640	218	Fana, Arna and Åsane, Fyllingsdalen
Bodø	Bodø	73,900	161	5,722	63	—
Drammen	Drammen	120,100	236	14,941	80	—
Fjordane	Florø	69,600	108	3,892	40	—
Follo	Ski	100,700	187	9,986	65	—
Fredrikstad	Fredrikstad	70,900	139	8,330	54	—
Gudbrandsdal	Lillehammer	70,000	126	5,115	47	—
Halden	Halden	32,000	93	3,291	37	—
Hamar	Hamar	82,900	143	6,801	51	—
Hardanger	Odda	25,000	54	1,888	54	—
Haugesund	Haugesund	90,000	160	9,125	58	—
Helgeland	Mosjøen	43,000	86	2,715	36	—
Hordaland	Bergen	179,500	241	10,874	85	—
Inntrøndelag	Steinkjer	91,800	183	6,423	70	—
Kongsberg	Kongsberg	43,500	88	4,156	35	—
Kongsvinger	Kongsvinger	54,000	104	4,511	42	—
Kragerø	Kragerø	14,800	53	2,017	17	—
Kristiansand	Kristiansand	105,600	259	13,061	95	Randesund, Vågsbygd
Larvik	Larvik	42,000	94	5,191	38	—
Lofoten and Vesterålen	Svolvær	55,600	100	2,775	41	—
Moss	Moss	61,400	120	6,330	44	—
Namdal	Namsos	37,300	83	1,823	35	—
Narvik	Narvik	93,500	183	10,347	73	—
Northern Jarlsberg	Horten	57,200	115	6,177	47	Holmestrand
Nordmøre	Kristiansund	60,200	112	3,484	48	—
Notodden	Notodden	26,100	65	2,895	26	—
Oslo	Grønland	502,900	2,233	112,187	791	Majorstuen, Manglerud, Sentrum, Stovner
Rana	Mo i Rana	34,400	86	2,881	34	—
Ringerike	Hønefoss	70,900	139	7,009	56	—
Rjukan	Rjukan	13,100	38	959	17	—
Rogaland	Egersund	123,200	212	11,333	81	Sandnes
Romerike	Lillestrøm	212,100	476	21,501	157	Oslo Airport, Gardermoen
Romsdal	Molde	56,000	100	3,495	39	—
Sandefjord	Sandefjord	43,000	98	6,169	38	—
Sarpsborg	Sarpsborg	81,900	151	8,281	57	Askim
Senja	Harstad	47,000	99	3,290	43	—
Skien	Skien	57,900	128	6,302	53	—
Sogn	Sogndalsfjøra	38,000	75	1,901	30	—
Stavanger	Stavanger	156,000	336	15,778	129	—
Sunnmøre	Ålesund	123,400	185	6,431	66	—
Sør-Varanger	Kirkenes	9,800	69	1,258	23	—
Telemark	Porsgrunn	53,300	113	6,832	45	—
Troms	Tromsø	105,200	234	10,789	100	—
Trondheim	Trondheim	152,000	375	17,152	141	—
Tønsberg	Tønsberg	66,100	139	8,034	52	—
Uttrøndelag	Trondheim	108,900	170	6,207	63	—
Vadsø	Vadsø	14,800	66	1,672	27	Båtsfjord
Vardø	Vardø	8,000	41	838	19	—
Vest-Agder	Mandal	93,500	183	10,347	73	Flekkefjord
Western Finnmark	Hammerfest	42,100	121	4,108	47	—
Western Oppland	Gjøvik	112,700	178	8,331	64	—
Østerdal	Elverum	49,800	104	4,360	42	—
