= Vnukovo Airlines Flight 2801 =

1996 aviation accident in Norway

- A piece of aircraft wreckage

Accident
- Date: 29 August 1996 CEST
- Summary: Controlled flight into terrain due to navigational error
- Site: Operafjellet, Spitsbergen, Svalbard, Norway; 78°12′51″N 16°05′43″E

Aircraft
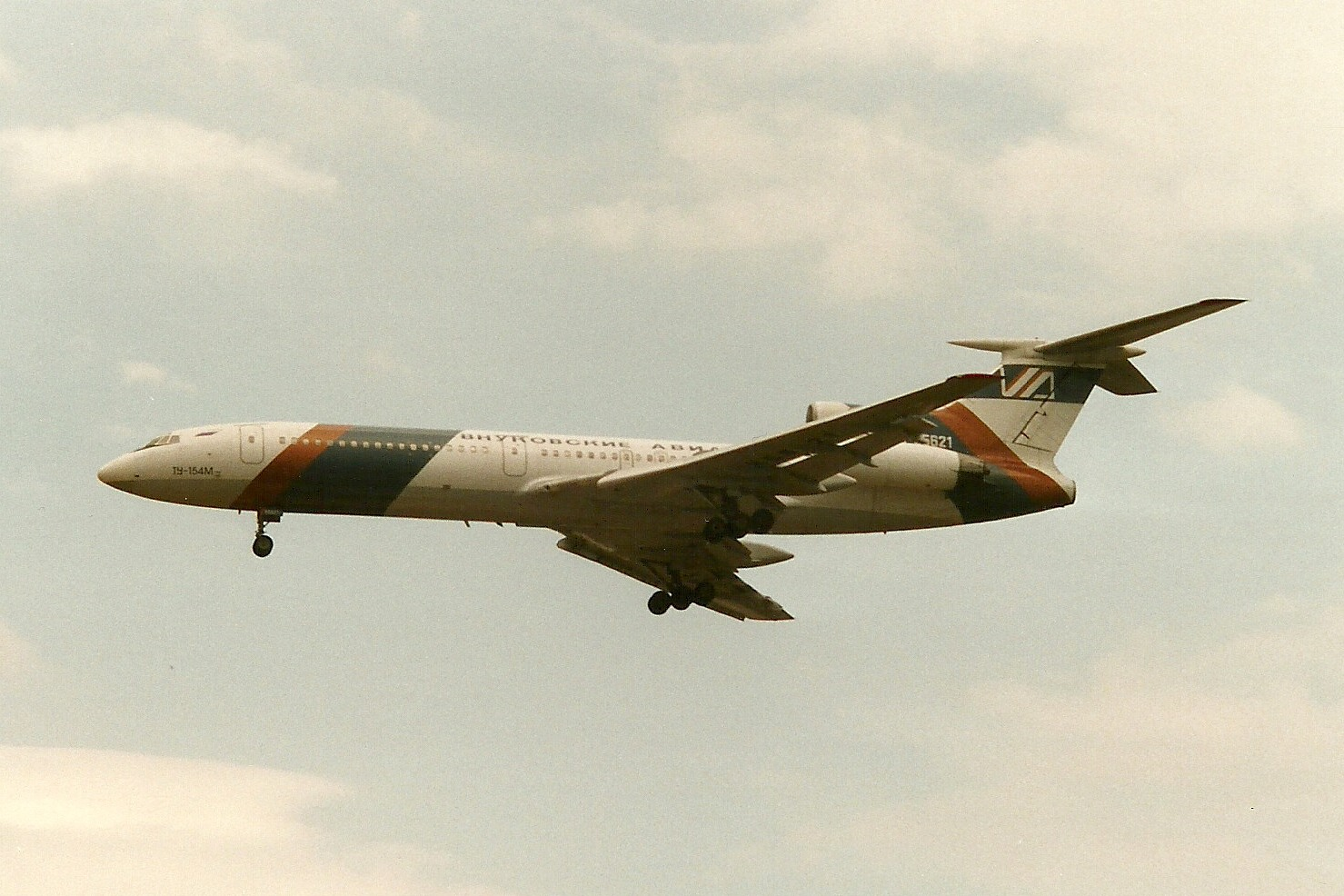
- RA-85621, the aircraft involved in the accident, pictured in May 1996
- Aircraft type: Tupolev Tu-154M
- Operator: Vnukovo Airlines
- IATA flight No.: V52801
- ICAO flight No.: VKO2801
- Call sign: VNUKOVO2801
- Registration: RA-85621
- Flight origin: Vnukovo International Airport, Moscow, Russia
- Destination: Svalbard Airport, Longyear, Longyearbyen, Norway
- Occupants: 141
- Passengers: 130
- Crew: 11
- Fatalities: 141
- Survivors: 0

Vnukovo Airlines Flight 2801 was an international charter flight from Vnukovo International Airport in Moscow, Russia, to Svalbard Airport on Spitsbergen, in the Norwegian archipelago of Svalbard. On 29 August 1996 at 10:22:23 CEST, a Tupolev Tu-154M operating this flight crashed into the ground in Operafjellet during the final approach to Svalbard Airport. All 141 people (11 crew members and 130 passengers, of whom three were children) aboard the plane were killed, making it the deadliest aviation accident in Norwegian history. The accident was the result of a series of small navigational errors causing the aircraft to be 3.7 kilometres (2.3 mi; 2.0 nmi) from the approach centerline at the time of impact.

The Vnukovo Airlines aircraft, with the registration number RA-85621, had been chartered by Arktikugol, a Russian state-owned coal-mining company, to fly Russian and Ukrainian workers to the towns of Barentsburg and Pyramiden in Svalbard. The accident was a contributing cause for Arktikugol's closure of Pyramiden two years later. The accident was investigated by the Accident Investigation Board Norway with assistance from the Interstate Aviation Committee and became known as the Operafjell accident (Norwegian: Operafjell-ulykken). After the accident, a series of lawsuits determined compensation for the victims' families.

== History ==
=== Flight ===
Flight 2801 was chartered on behalf of Arktikugol, which operated mines at the two company towns of Barentsburg and Pyramiden in Svalbard. The aircraft was a Tupolev Tu-154M, with registration RA-85621, and serial number 86A 742, manufactured on 14 January 1987. The crew consisted of captain Evgeny Nikolaevich Nikolaev (aged 44), co-pilot Boris Fedorovich Sudarev (aged 58), (Note: Sudarev was also a captain on the Tu-154, but on the accident flight he was the co-pilot.) navigator Igor Petrovich Akimov (aged 50), flight engineer Anatoly Matveevich Karapetrov (aged 38), five cabin crew members, and two technicians to service the plane during the stopover. The captain and navigator had previously landed at Svalbard Airport, but only runway 10; the co-pilot had not.

On board were 130 passengers, Arktikugol employees and their families including three children. Waiting at the airport for the return flight were 120 people. The aircraft left Vnukovo Airport at 04:44 UTC (08:44 MSD). Estimated flight time was three and a half hours, and alternative airports were Murmansk Airport and Severomorsk-3 in Murmansk Oblast. The flight proceeded normally until descent, following the routing W 29 from Moscow to Padun (west of Murmansk), before crossing to Bodø Flight Information Region over the Barents Sea cruising at FL 350, approximately 35,000 feet (11,000 m) at an average airspeed of 500 kilometres per hour (270 kn; 310 mph). It then proceeded over non-directional beacons over Bjørnøya, Isfjorden, and Adventdalen.

Longyear is the main airport serving the Svalbard archipelago. It is located on the south shore of Isfjorden at an elevation of 28 metres (92 ft) above mean sea level, with high terrain to the south, southeast, and east. It has a single, 2,140-metre-long (7,020 ft) 10/28 runway, running roughly east–west. The airport is regarded as uncontrolled and does not provide approach service; it has an aerodrome flight information service (AFIS), subordinate to Bodø Air Traffic Control Center (ATCC)-

On that day, all aircraft had used runway 28 due to the wind, favorable climb-up conditions, and short distance from the terminal at the eastern end. The weather at the accident area was dominated by a low pressure trough, causing rain showers and wind 15 to 30 knots (28 to 56 km/h; 17 to 35 mph) from 240–270°. Between 08:00 and 09:00, a weak trough passed, reducing visibility to 6 kilometres (3.7 mi; 3.2 nmi) with cloud base at 1,300 to 1,500 metres (4,300 to 4,900 ft). Afterward, it improved back to over 10 kilometres (6.2 mi; 5.4 nmi) and 3,000 to 4,000 feet (900 to 1,200 m).

=== Accident ===
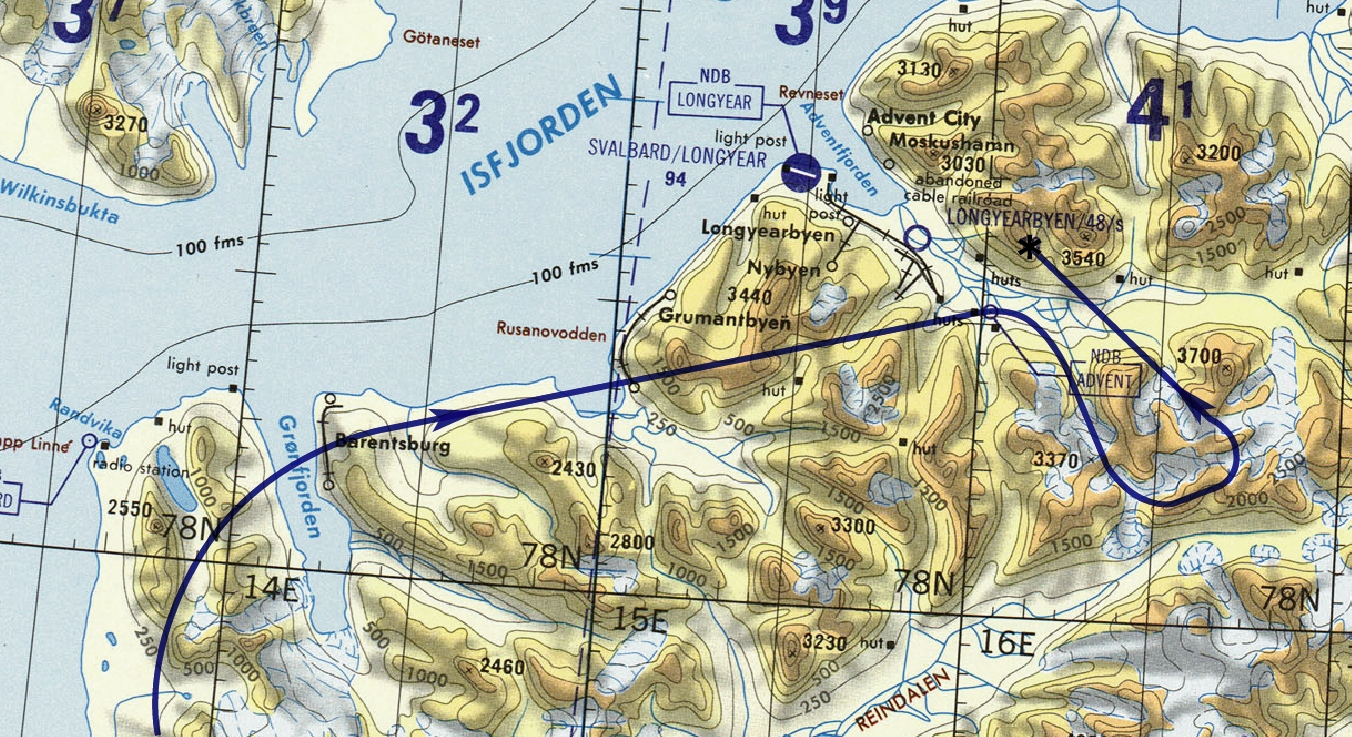
The Tu-154's route of flight and accident location

At 07:55 UTC (09:55 local Central European Summer Time, CEST), the crew requested clearance to start their descent. Because of lack of communication with Bodø ATCC, this was not obtained. At 07:56, information from Longyear AFIS was given that it had no conflicting traffic, allowing a descent to 1,800 m (6,000 ft). The crew tried to request use of Runway 10, but this was, due to language problems, not understood as such by AFIS. Instead, Longyear communicated the actual weather and informed that Runway 28 was in use. An additional request for use of Runway 10 was again not understood, because of the misunderstanding of the term "runway in use". Because of this, the crew decided to instead use Runway 28.

The crew used Jeppesen charts dated 21 January 1994. It was LOC/DME approach with offset localizer. According to airline procedures, both horizontal situation indicators (HSIs) were set to magnetic runway heading 283°, but the magnetic localizer course of 300° was not used. A global positioning system (GPS) was used as a back-up and also set to magnetic runway heading 283°. Aircrew was probably not aware of VHF direction finding available at the airport and have not used it to confirm aircraft position. From 3,000 metres (10,000 ft) until impact, the flight was carried out in instrument meteorological conditions and the flight controlled by automatic stabilization mode, with lateral navigation controlled by the navigator.

At 08:10 UTC, the aircraft reached 1,524 metres (5,000 ft), which is the minimum altitude to Advent and the initial approach altitude. At 08:15:32 UTC, it reached Advent and entered a base turn, reaching a magnetic heading of 160° at 08:16:28 UTC. The turn was started late and resulted in aircraft flying northeast (left) of correct outbound track. While the crew had adjusted for the wind drift, they did not attempt to intercept the magnetic course 155° outbound from Advent. During this turn, a malfunction in the electric trimming mechanism caused the piloting pilot to deactivate the aircraft flight control systems' servogear in the pitch channel at 08:15:58. This was again activated at 08:16:42 UTC.

At 08:17:08 UTC, the crew started the inbound turn; however, the lateral deviation from the outbound magnetic course 155° was 3.7 km (2.3 mi; 2.0 nmi) to the left and combined with tailwind, caused airplane to pass through the localizer and roll out of turn to the right of localizer centerline. At 08:17:57 UTC, the navigator said "Ah, abeam eight miles 2801 inbound", to which AFIS replied two seconds later "Correct". This was the last radio communication between the crew and Longyear. At 08:18:30 UTC, the piloting pilot turned off the autopilot pitch channel. For the rest of the flight, the plane continued with autopilot only in roll.

Following the aircraft rolling out on 290° heading, a discussion arose among the crew if the turn had been made at the right time. The initial comment about this was made by the first officer at 08:19:06 UTC. The crew disagreed if the course correction should be made to left or to right. This resulted in series of corrective turns in opposing directions, first to magnetic heading 306°. At this time, the aircraft was 27.4 nautical miles (50.7 km; 31.5 mi) from the airport and 2.8 kilometres (1.7 mi; 1.5 nmi) right of the centerline at 1,520 metres (5,000 ft) with an airspeed of 330 kilometres per hour (180 kn; 210 mph). Instead of intercepting the centerline, the crew continued to track on the right side of localizer.

At 08:20:17 UTC, the pilot in command ordered the aircraft turned to 291°, which, when adjusted for drift, resulted in a course close to 300°, nearly paralleling the localizer course. At this time, the aircraft had a lateral deviation from the approach centerline of 3.7 kilometres (2.3 mi; 2.0 nmi). The aircraft started descending at 08:20:24 UTC. A corrective turn was made at 08:21:13 UTC and completed 11 seconds later at magnetic heading 300°. At the time, the aircraft was descending 900 to 1,260 feet per minute (4.6 to 6.4 m/s). The aircraft started turning left at 08:22:05 UTC, and immediately entered an area of turbulence created by the surrounding mountains.

During initial approach, the radio altimeter warning had been activated several times, which indicated less than 750 metres (2,460 ft) from the aircraft to the terrain. During final approach, the ground proximity warning system was activated nine seconds before impact, which lasted until impact. Six seconds before impact, the radio altimeter warning was activated. The crew initiated climb in reaction to GPWS activation, but it was too late to avoid terrain. At 08:22:23 UTC (10:22:23 local CEST) the aircraft collided with the top of Operafjellet at 907 metres (2,976 ft) elevation, located 14.2 kilometres (8.8 mi; 7.7 nmi) from Svalbard Airport and 3.7 kilometres (2.3 mi; 2.0 nmi) right of the approach centerline. The aircraft was destroyed and all occupants perished. It is the single deadliest plane crash to have occurred on Norwegian soil.

=== Recovery ===
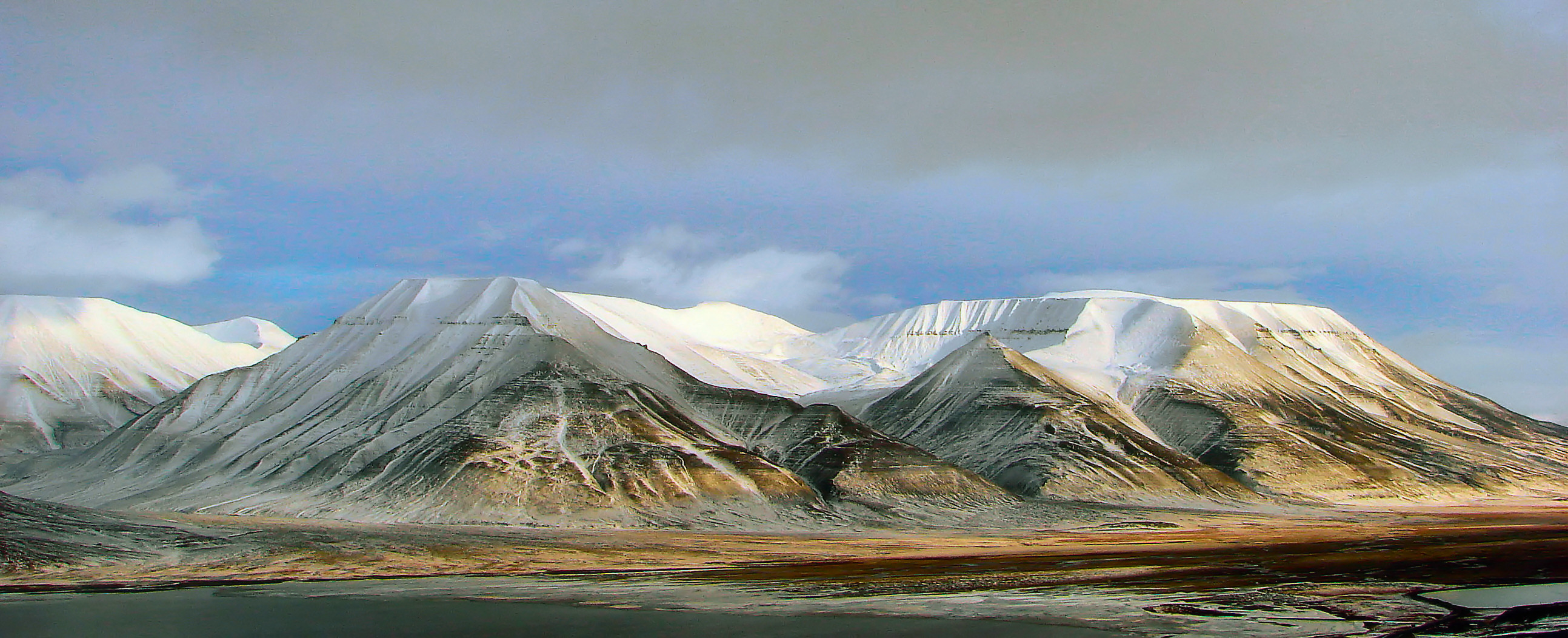
Adventfjorden with Operafjellet, the location of the accident, in the background

The Joint Rescue Coordination Centre of Northern Norway received a message about the crash at 10:30 CEST (8:30 UTC) and the search-and-rescue service was immediately deployed. This included seven Norwegian aircraft that were in the area. The area had bad weather with a low cloud height, resulting in difficult searching conditions. The aircraft was found at 12:06 CEST at Operafjellet, 14 km (8.7 mi) east of Svalbard Airport. Most of the aircraft was located on the mountain's plateau, although some debris had slid down a vertical cliff and was scattered along the valley and partially covered by an avalanche. Rescue workers and medics from Longyearbyen Hospital arrived at 12:36, and quickly established that no one survived.

The responsibility of the recovery was transferred to the governor of Svalbard on 30 August. In addition, police personnel from the mainland were transferred to Svalbard to work with the investigation and recovery. The work was supplemented by local volunteers. Because of the bad weather, which included fog and snow, transporting workers to the plateau was often impossible, so work started in the valley.

Governor Ann-Kristin Olsen traveled to Barentsburg on 30 August to inform the communities about the accident, and distributed ample written information in Russian about the then-known details about the crash. Later in the day, a Russian aircraft arrived with Deputy Minister Aleksandr Petrovich of the Ministry of Emergency Situations along with a team of 11 rescue workers, and representatives from the Interstate Aviation Committee, the Embassy of Ukraine in Moscow, the Federal Air Transport Agency, and Vnukovo Airlines. In a meeting that evening, Olsen accepted Russian assistance, while international agreement confirmed that the investigation would be led by the Norwegian authorities. On 31 August, Grete Faremo, the Norwegian minister of justice visited the Russian settlements as a representative from the government of Norway.

The accident had a large impact on the community, with only 1,600 people living in the two Russian settlements at the time. The population in the communities did not speak Norwegian, and did not have a road connection to Longyearbyen. This made it difficult for Olsen to give accurate and detailed information. Issues were further complicated by erroneous reports in Russian media that there were five survivors. The governor's cabin in Barentsburg was manned during the aftermath, and bulletins were distributed with updated information in Russian. The accident was one of the factors causing Arktikugol to abandon Pyramiden in 1998.

== Investigation ==
Agreements between Norwegian and Russian authorities were made on 31 August, where Norway resumed full responsibility for the recovery and investigation, but Russian help was accepted. To allow the Russian workers access from the morning of 1 September, the crew was allowed to fly in and establish a base camp, but no work was to be done until Norwegian supervisors arrived in the morning. However, two people were observed at the wreck at about 20:00 CEST, who were brought to the governor's offices for questioning. As they were both members of the Russian team, it was decided that the base would be disbanded.

Fog was still on the plateau on 1 September, but by 15:00 CEST it was possible to fly a team there by helicopter. Because the fog stayed, the team retained work until 03:00 CEST in the night. In the following days, the fog lifted, making work and transport easier. By 5 September, all bodies had been recovered and the work at the plateau could be terminated. The recovery in the valley was completed two days later. The accident resulted in about 40 journalists staying in Svalbard to cover the story. The Norwegian authority's costs related to the investigation and other activities related to the accident were estimated at 30 million Norwegian krone (NOK).

All identification of people was performed in Tromsø, as a cooperation between Troms Police District, National Criminal Investigation Service, and the University Hospital of North Norway. By 18 September, all people had been identified, and the bodies were transported to Russia and Ukraine on 20 September after a short memorial in Tromsøhallen. An autopsy was performed on all crew members, without finding any abnormalities.

The official responsibility for investigating the incident lay with the Air Accident Investigation Board/Norway (AAIB/N), although the investigation and report was a close cooperation with the Interstate Aviation Committee and to a lesser extent, the Federal Air Transport Agency. AAIB/N had the primary responsibility for investigations at the crash site, cooperation with the Norwegian police and the Norwegian Civil Aviation Administration, and writing the report. IAC was responsible for handling the investigations in Russia, the reading of the cockpit voice recorder, the flight data recorder, the relationship with Vnukovo Airlines and a test flight. Both agencies agreed that English was to be the language of the final report; English is one of the ICAO languages.

=== Cause ===
The official investigation concluded that the flight, regarded as a controlled flight into terrain, was caused by pilot errors and that no fault was found with the aircraft. Contributing factors causing the accident were lack of a procedure for offset localizer approach for setting approach course on the HSIs. Thus, both HSIs were set incorrectly, which along with the course deviation indicator hinted that the plane was being blown to the left and needed to adjust course to the right. Because he was in a stressed situation, the navigator set the GPS in the wrong mode. He also did not have sufficient time to recheck his work, allowing mistakes to happen, and his work was not monitored by the pilots. As the navigator was overworked, it was inappropriate for the first officer to transfer the responsibility of lateral control to him.

The AFIS air controller has a different role in Norway from in Russia, and the crew were not aware that they were being given information and advice, rather than orders. Communication with AFIS was left with the navigator, which is a breach of norms. Communication between air control and the crew was problematic, since the crew lacked sufficient English skills. The pilot in command had insufficient crew resource management knowledge. After the crew decided to carry out the approach to Runway 28, a new approach briefing was not accomplished. The aircraft overshot the approach centerline when turning inbound, because they did not try to intercept the outbound track from Advent. The crew showed a lack of situational awareness following their uncertainty of the aircraft position in relation to LLZ 28, caused by indications on the HSIs.

Situational awareness was also reduced because the pilots did not have a chart in front of them at all times. The crew were not aware that they could check the aircraft location in relation to the centerline with a VDF (VHF direction finder). The crew probably put too much emphasis on the indications displayed by the GPS. The aircraft descended into mountainous terrain without control over the lateral navigation. Despite uncertainty and disagreement in the group, the approach was not abandoned, as the aircraft should have climbed to a safe altitude while the problem was solved.

== Aftermath ==
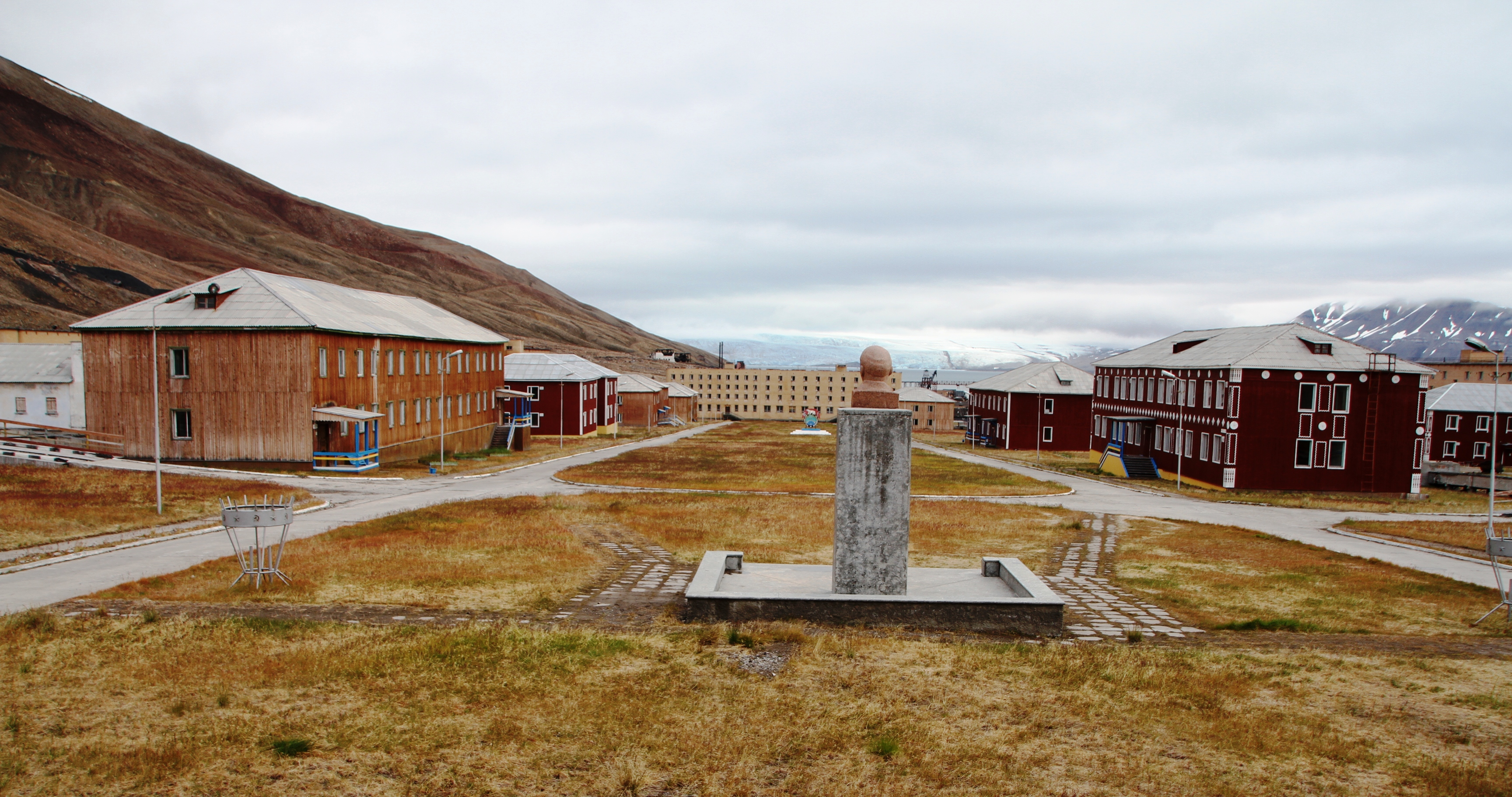
The accident was a contributing cause for Arktikugol's closure of Pyramiden two years later, in 1998; until 2007 it remained largely abandoned with most of its infrastructure and buildings still in place.

On 20 September, the surviving relatives of each decedent received 2 million Russian rubles (about US$40,000) for each person who died in the accident. Ukrainian relatives stated to Norwegian media that they had not received information about the cause and other issues surrounding the accident. At the time, Ukraine was experiencing very high unemployment, and Arktikugol offered wages many times what was then offered in Ukraine. Many miners not only had to support their immediate family, but also relatives. Vnukovo Airlines stated on Ukrainian television that the relatives would receive US$20,000 per person killed. About a year after the accident, all relatives had been offered US$20,000, but about two-thirds of them chose not to accept the amount, and instead started a process to sue the insurance company. Their lawyer, Gunnar Nerdrum, stated that according to both Norwegian and Russian law, they could demand at least US$140,000.

In February 1998, the Norwegian Ministry of Justice stated that the relatives did not have a right to occupational injury compensation from the Norwegian National Insurance. Because of the Svalbard Treaty, the archipelago is an economic free zone and Arktikugol is exempt from paying social insurance, so its employees did not have a right to Norwegian benefits. Had this been the case, widows would have received about NOK 600,000 per worker. By 1998, a few of the relatives had accepted the US$20,000 compensation, while the rest of them were planning to sue both the airline's insurance company and Arktikugol. Among the issues in the case, which took place at Nord-Troms District Court, was whether the accident was to be considered a working accident, and thus would result in injury compensation from the mining company. In November, it was decided that the Ukrainians needed to make a guarantee for NOK 2.5 million to run the case, which they could not afford. They, therefore, had no alternative but to accept the proposal from the insurance company. In June 1999, the parties agreed on a settlement, where the compensation was not disclosed to the public. It was later disclosed that the settlement was about three times the initial offer from the insurance company. In 1999, the Norwegian Ministry of Foreign Affairs established a scholarship to help children who lost a parent in the accident to take senior secondary and tertiary education.
