= Truls Fyhn =

Norwegian police chief

- Born: 14 May 1945; Tromsø, Norway
- Died: 25 December 2011 (aged 66)
- Occupation: Police chief

Truls Fyhn (14 May 1945 – 25 December 2011) was a Norwegian police chief.

He was born in Tromsø. Fyhn chaired the narcotics section of the Oslo Police District from 1983, and the crime section from 1990 to 1994. He served as Chief of police in the Troms Police District from 1994 to 2011. He died in December 2011.
