= Rogaland Police District =

Agency overview
- Formed: 1 January 2003
- Dissolved: 2016
- Superseding agency: Southwest Police District
- Employees: 738

Jurisdictional structure
- Operations jurisdiction: Sirdal municipality in Vest-Agder county and the southern part, Rogaland, Norway
- General nature: Local civilian police

Operational structure
- Overseen by: National Police Directorate
- Headquarters: Stavanger
- Agency executive: Hans Vik, Chief of Police

Facilities
- Stations: 16

Rogaland Police District (Norwegian: Rogaland politidistrikt) is a former police districts in Norway, which covered most of Rogaland county (except for the Haugalandet area). The district was headquartered in the city of Stavanger and consists of three police stations: at Stavanger, Sandnes and Egersund, and 13 sheriff's offices. The district was led by Chief of Police Hans Vik. As of 2011 the district had 738 employees. The chief of police is responsible for the Joint Rescue Coordination Centre of Southern Norway at Sola. The police district was created in 2003 as a merger between the former Rogaland Police District and Stavanger Police District.

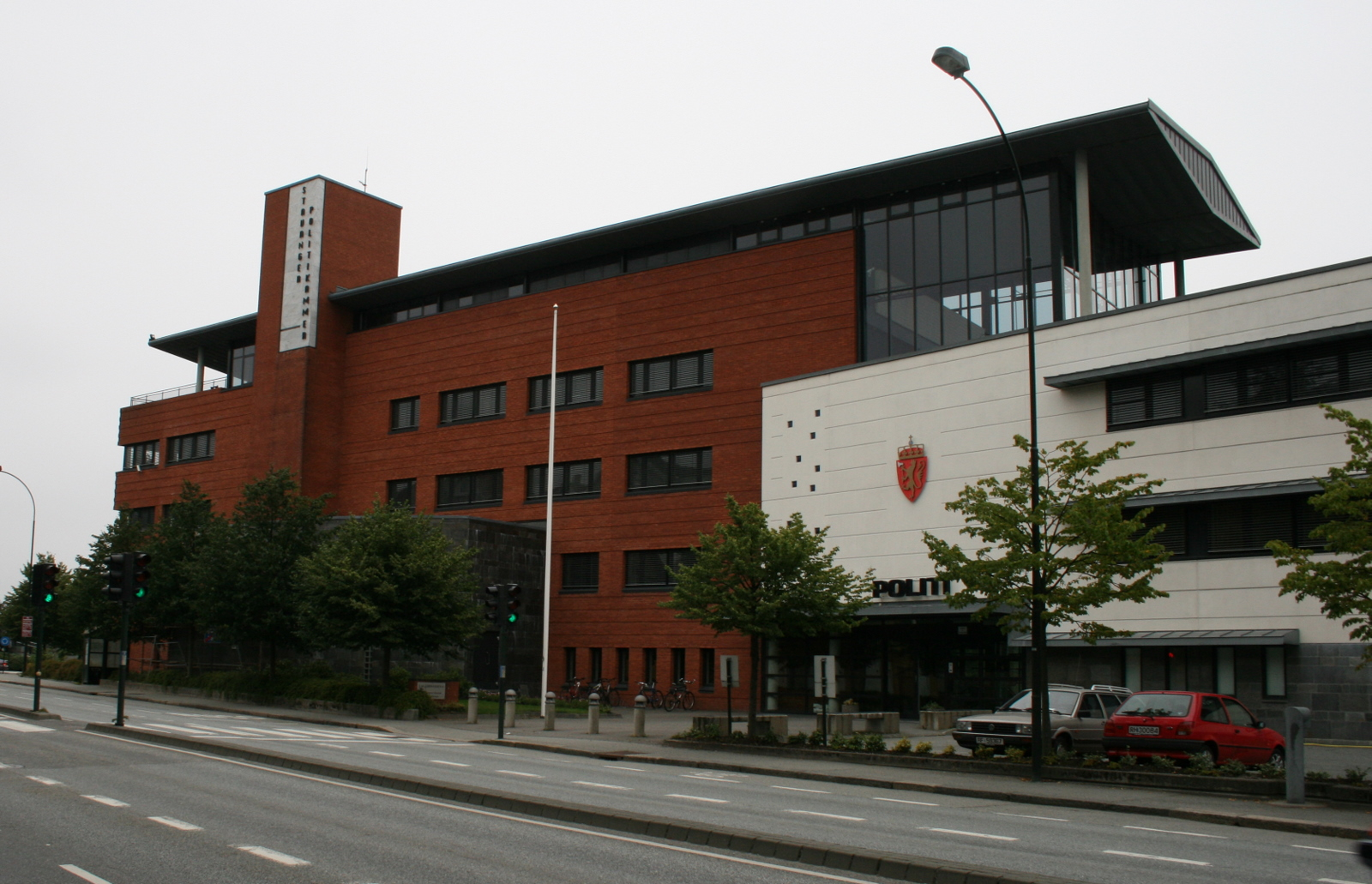
Stavanger Police Station
