= Eastern Finnmark Police District =

Agency overview
- Formed: 1 January 2003
- Dissolved: 31 December 2016
- Employees: 165

Jurisdictional structure
- Operations jurisdiction: Øst-Finnmark, Finnmark (eastern part), Norway
- General nature: Local civilian police

Operational structure
- Overseen by: National Police Directorate
- Headquarters: Kirkenes
- Agency executive: Ellen Katrine Hætta, Chief of Police
- Units: Border Police; Reindeer Police (operates snowmobile)

Facilities
- Stations: 8

Website
- https://www.politi.no/ostfinnmark

Eastern Finnmark Police District (Norwegian: Østfinnmark politidistrikt) was one of 27 police districts in Norway from 2003-2016. It covered the eastern part of Finnmark county in Northern Norway. The district was headquartered in Kirkenes and consisted of three police stations at Kirkenes, Vadsø and Vardø, plus five sheriff's offices. The district was led by Chief of Police Ellen Katrine Hætta prior to its dissolution in 2016. Specifically the police district covered the municipalities of Vardø, Vadsø, Karasjok, Lebesby, Gamvik, Berlevåg, Tana, Nesseby, Båtsfjord, Sør-Varanger. As of 2011 the district had 165 employees. It has a special responsibility for the Norway–Russia border control at Storskog and the Reindeer Police. The police district was created in 2003 as a merger between the former Sør-Varanger Police District, Vadsø Police District, and Vardø Police District. In 2017, it was dissolved and it became part of the newly created Finnmark Police District which covered all of Finnmark county.
