= Salten Police District =

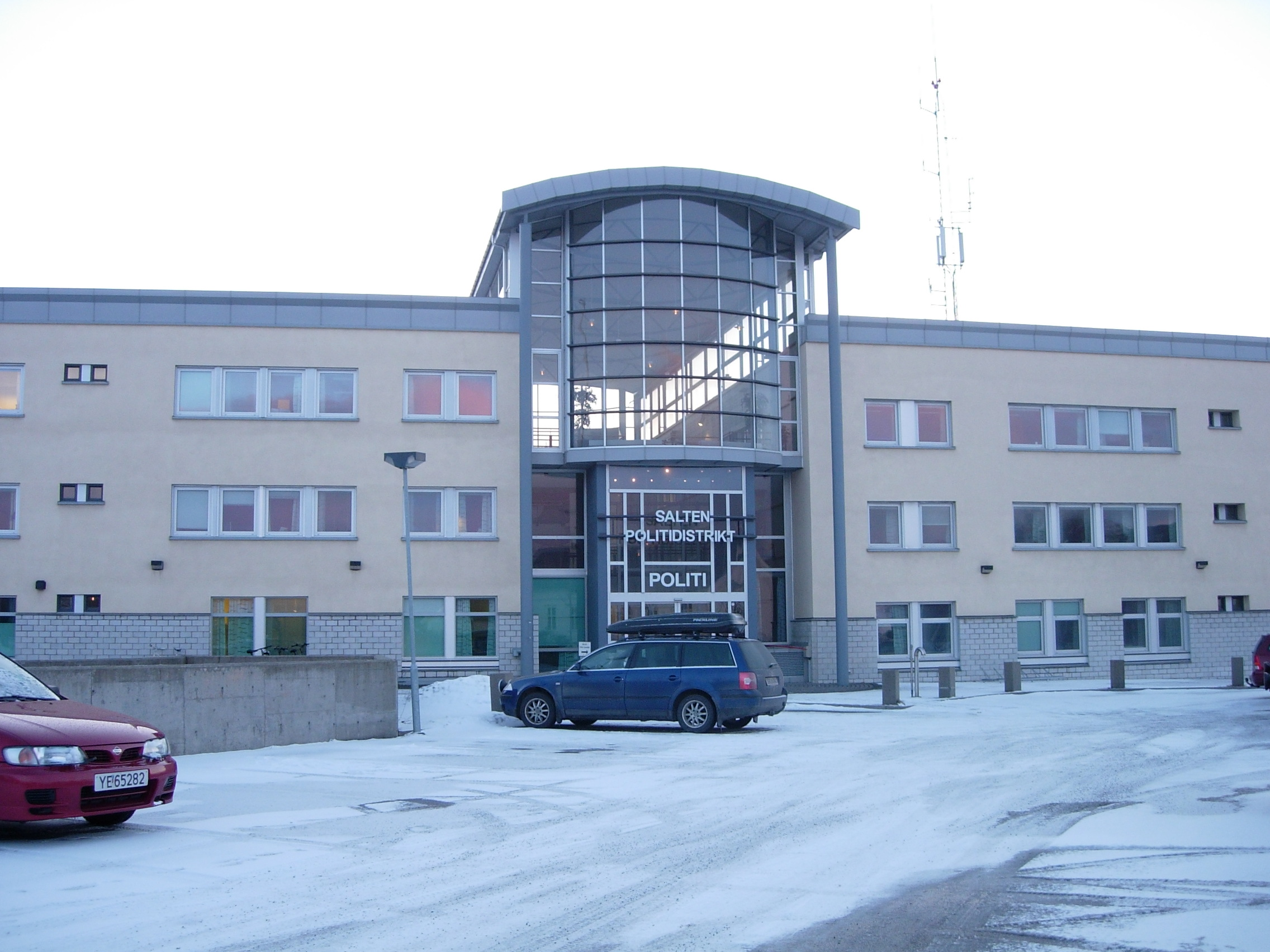
- Bodø Police Station

Agency overview
- Formed: 1894
- Dissolved: 2017
- Superseding agency: Nordland Police District
- Employees: 195

Jurisdictional structure
- Operations jurisdiction: Salten, Nordland, Norway
- General nature: Local civilian police

Operational structure
- Overseen by: National Police Directorate
- Headquarters: Bodø Police Station
- Agency executive: Geir Ove Heir, Chief of Police

Facilities
- Stations: 10

Website
- https://www.politi.no/salten

Salten Police District (Norwegian: Salten politidistrikt) was a police district in Norway until 2017 when it became part of the Nordland Police District.

The Salten Police District covered the Salten district of Nordland county. The district was headquartered in Bodø and consisted of one main police station and nine regional sheriff's offices. The district was led by Chief of Police Geir Ove Heir. The police district covered the municipalities of Bodø, Rødøy, Meløy, Gildeskål, Beiarn, Saltdal, Fauske, Sørfold, Steigen, and Hamarøy in the Salten area plus two municipalities in Lofoten: Røst and Værøy. As of 2011 the district had 195 employees. It has a special responsibility with the chief of police being responsible for operations at the Joint Rescue Coordination Centre of Northern Norway. The police district was historically named Bodø Police District until 2002 when it was renamed Salten Police District.
