= Operafjellet =

Mountain in Svalbard, Norway

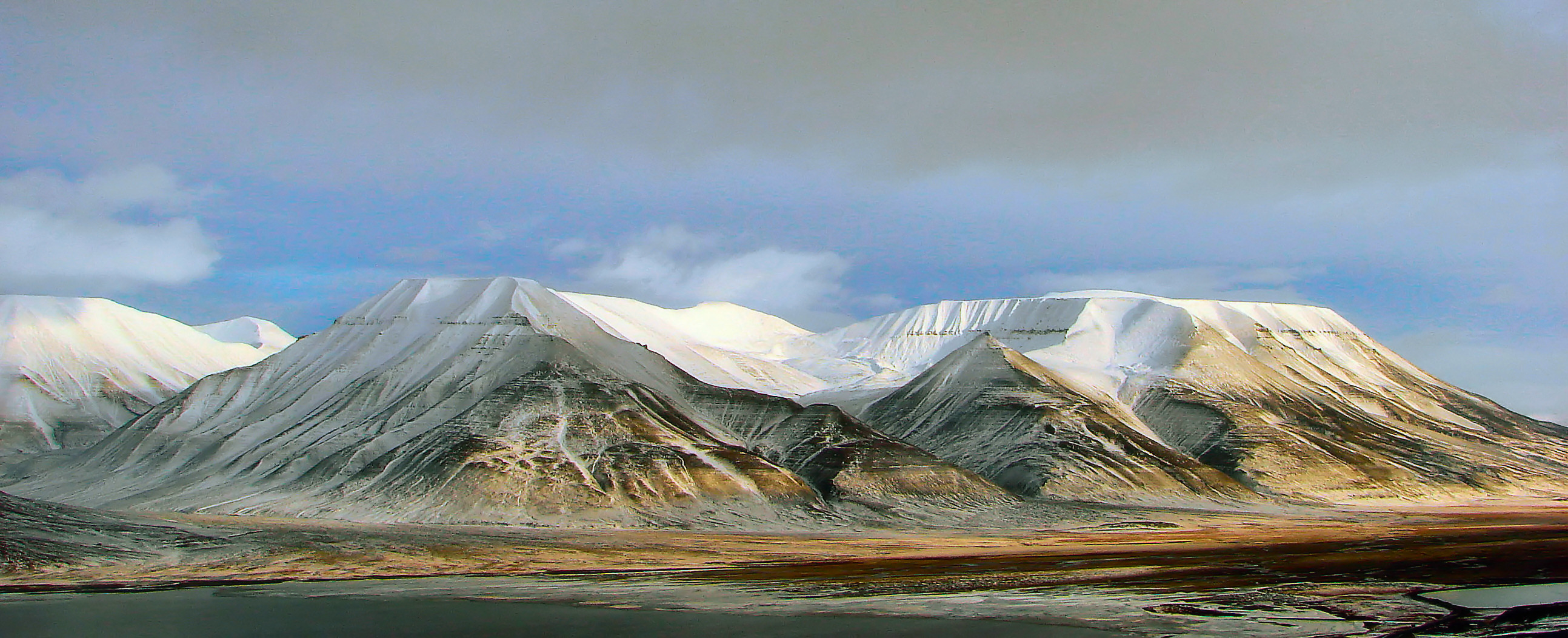

Highest point
- Elevation: 968 m (3,176 ft)
- Coordinates: 78°13.5′N 16°3.1′E

Geography
- Location within Svalbard
- Location: Spitsbergen, Svalbard, Norway

Operafjellet ("The Opera Mountain") is a mountain on Spitsbergen in Svalbard, Norway. It is 968 metres (3,176 ft) tall and is located on the north side of Adventdalen. It is named for the amphitheatre-shape of the mountain on the western side, with the peak Tenoren ("The Tenor") sticking up. On 29 August 1996, it was the site for the crash of Vnukovo Airlines Flight 2801 during approach to Svalbard Airport, Longyear, killing 141 people.
