= Northern Buskerud Police District =

Agency overview
- Formed: 2003
- Employees: 184

Jurisdictional structure
- Operations jurisdiction: Northern Buskerud, Buskerud, Norway
- General nature: Local civilian police

Operational structure
- Overseen by: National Police Directorate
- Headquarters: Hønefoss Police Station
- Agency executive: Sissel Hammer, Chief of Police

Facilities
- Stations: 11

Website
- https://www.politi.no/nordre_buskerud

Northern Buskerud Police District (Norwegian: Nordre Buskerud politidistrikt) was one of 27 police districts in Norway, covering the northern part of Buskerud. The district is headquartered in Hønefoss and consists of one police stations and ten sheriff's offices. The district is led by Chief of Police Sissel Hammer. The police district covers the municipalities of Ringerike, Hole, Flå, Nes, Gol, Hemsedal, Ål, Hol, Sigdal, Krødsherad, Modum, Nore og Uvdal plus Jevnaker in Oppland. As of 2011, the district had 184 employees.
