= Oslo Police District =

Oslo Police District _{Oslo politidistrikt}

Jurisdictional structure
- Operations jurisdiction: Oslo, Norway
- General nature: Local civilian police

Operational structure
- Overseen by: National Police Directorate
- Headquarters: Oslo Police Headquarters; Grønnlandsleiret 44
- Agency executive: Hans Sverre Sjøvold, Chief of Police
- Units: Mounted police (Rytterkorpset); Delta (Beredskapstroppen)

Facilities
- Stations: 7
- Boats: Harbor police
- Police helicopters: 2 x Eurocopter EC135

Website
- https://www.politi.no/oslo

Oslo Police District (Norwegian: Oslo politidistrikt) is the largest police district in Norway. The Police District of Asker og Bærum and Oslo Police District are from January 1, 2016 merged into one, and kept the name Oslo Police District. The police district comprises three municipalities, Oslo, Asker and Bærum. It has a total population of around 800,000 people. Oslo Police District has seven police stations in charge of policing duties, including assignments in terms of order, prevention and investigation purposes in the surrounding areas.

The Police Authority also has special sections for the investigation of serious crime. The investigation led formally by police lawyers, belonging to prosecutors.

Serious drug cases and robbery cases are investigated by the Section for organized crime, homicide cases and cases involving sexual crimes investigated by the Division of Violence and sexual crimes, while serious forms of economic crime investigation by the Financial and Environmental Crime Section. Traffic and sea buffet includes Trafikkorpset and Harbor Police and a specialist on criminal offenses related to the capital's traffic by land and sea. The Police is headquartered at Grønlandsleiret 44 at Grønland in Oslo.

== Police stations ==
Western unit

- Asker police station, located in Torvveien 20, Asker
- Bærum police station, located in Kjørboveien 33, Sandvika (Bærum)
- Majorstuen police station, located in Sørkedalsveien 27 B at Majorstuen

Unit of central Oslo

- Grønland police station, located in the Oslo Police Headquarters at Grønlandsleiret 44, Grønland.
- Sentrum police station, Hammersborggata 12, next door to National Police Directorate (Norway) in central Oslo.
- There is also a smaller police office, located at the Oslo Central Station.

Eastern unit

- Manglerud police station, located in Plogveien 31 at Manglerud.
- Stovner police station, located in Aasta Hansteens vei 10 at Stovner.

== Contact ==
Emergency telephone number is ☎ 112, non emergency calls at ☎ 02800 or ☎ (+47)22 66 90 50.

== Common units ==
- Police Section for Immigration Administration
- Common unit for operational service
- Common criminal unit
- Common unit for intelligence and investigation
- Common unit for prevention
- Common unit for prosecution
- Common unit for foreigners and administration
- Joint unit for civil justice (namsfogd)
- Common unit for national aid resources

== Mobility ==
Oslo Police disposal units that move on land (mounted police in addition to patrols on foot, by car and motorcycle), sea (Harbor Police) and by air (helicopter).

== Gallery ==
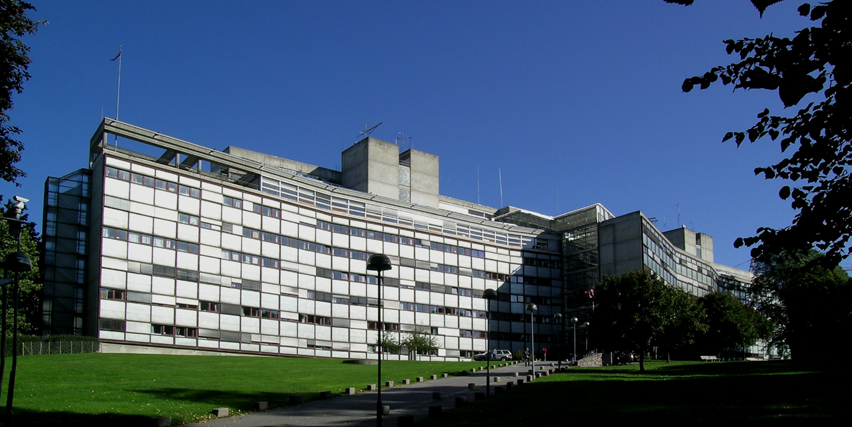
Oslo Police Headquarters

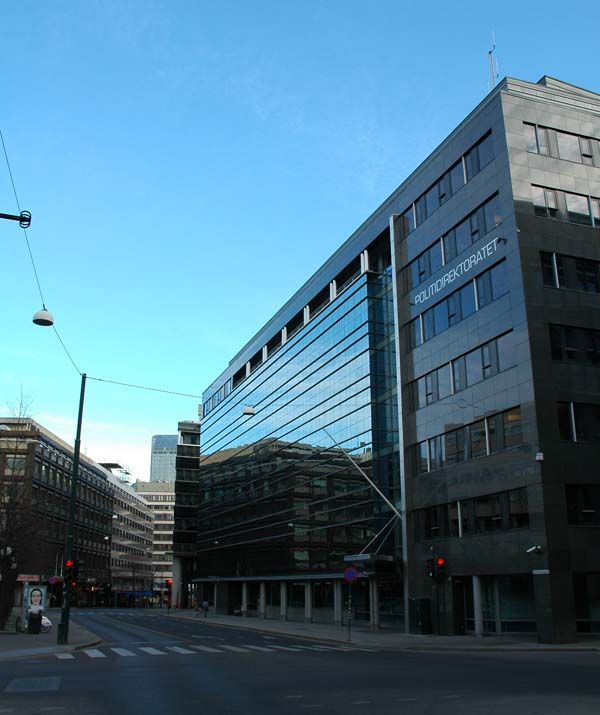
Sentrum Police Station

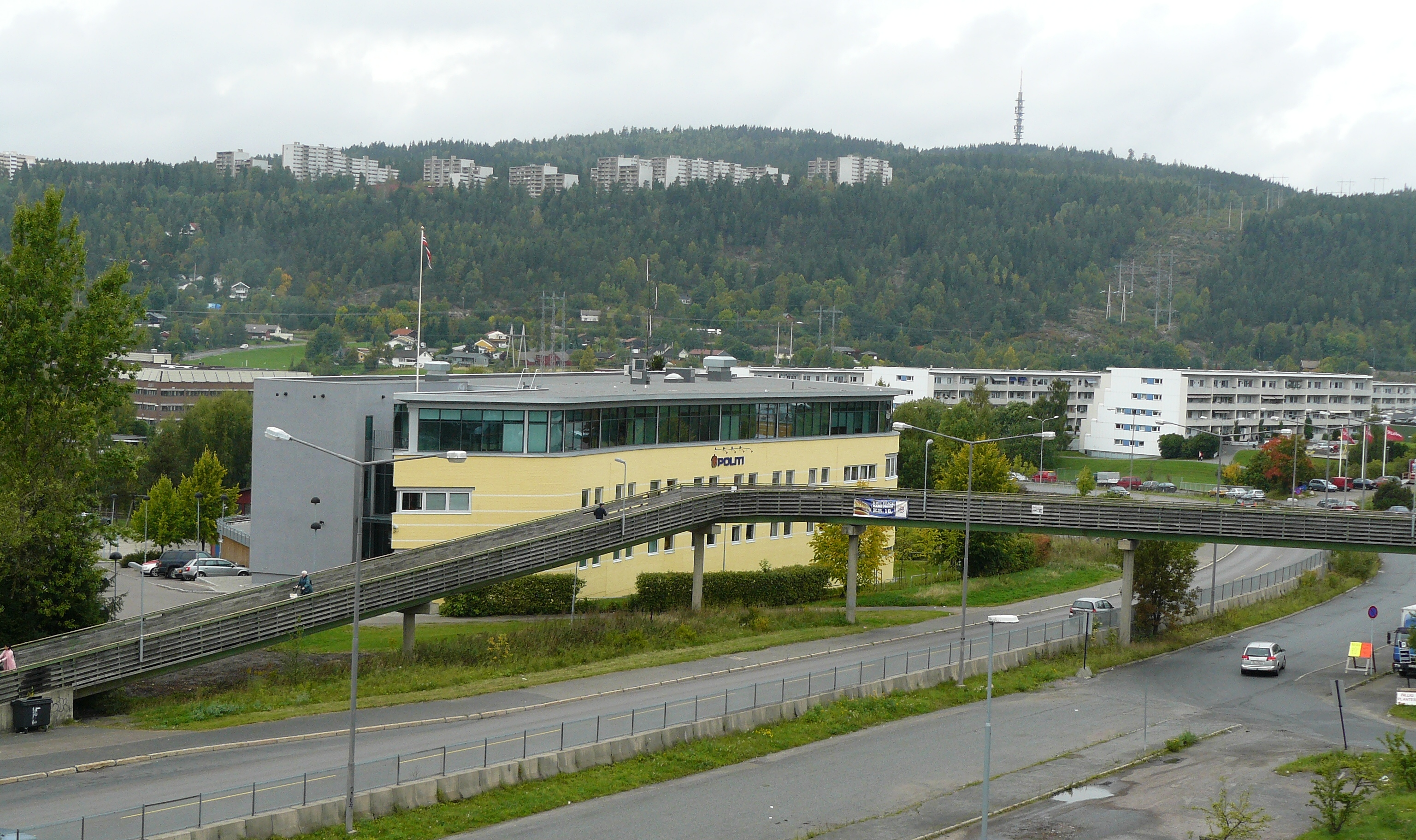
Stovner Police Station

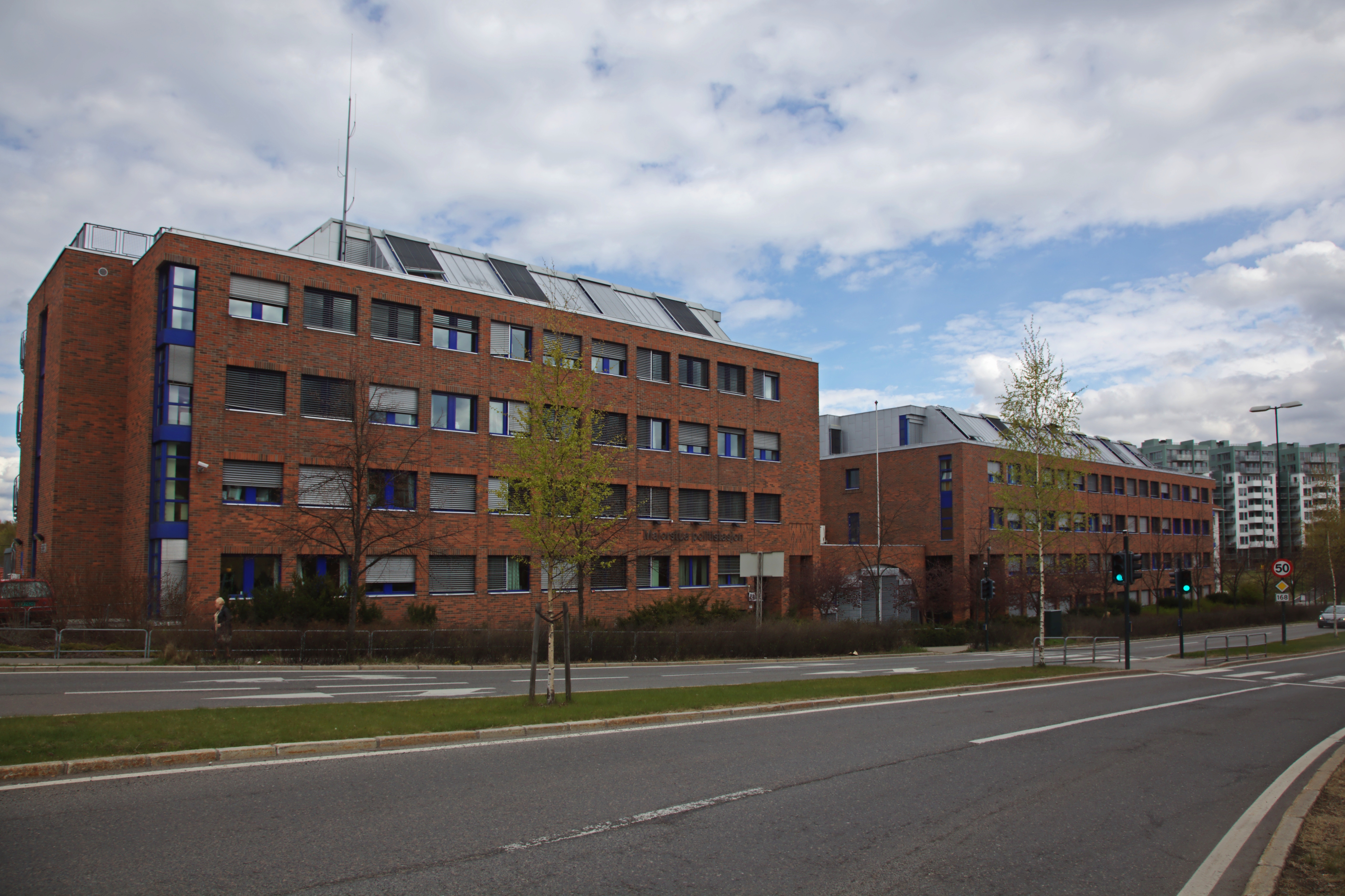
Majorstuen Police Station

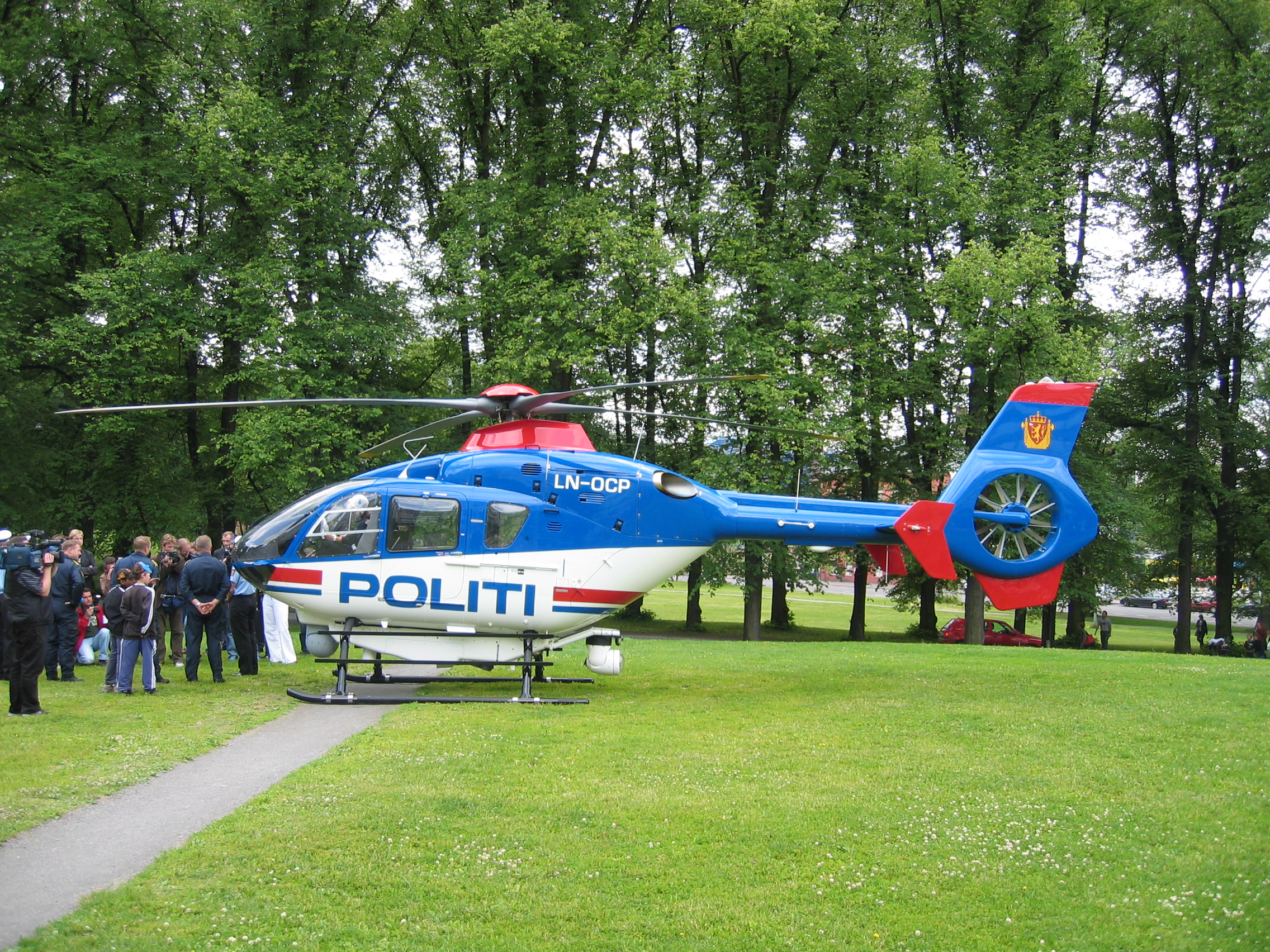
Police Helicopter in Oslo

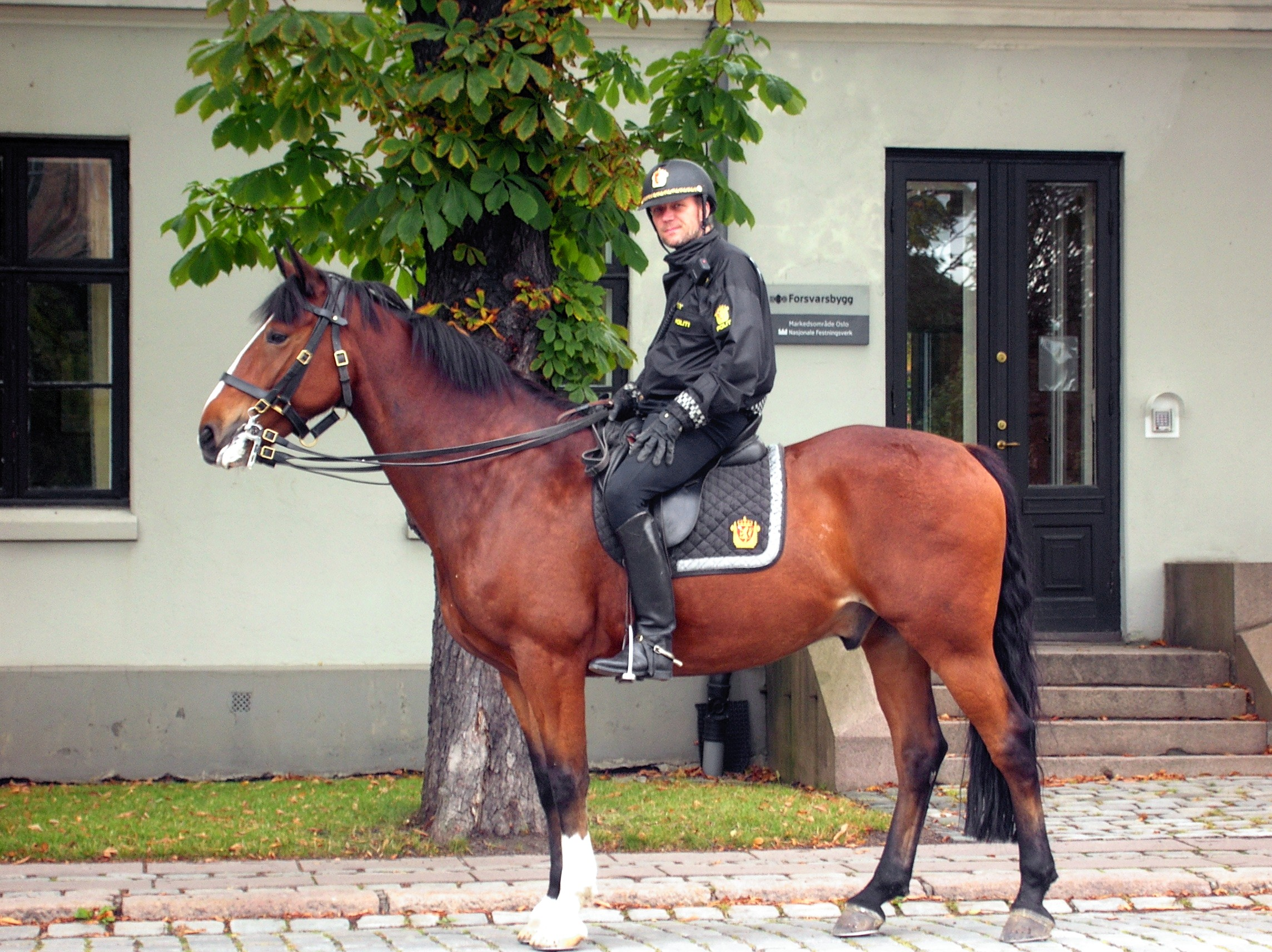
Mounted police in Oslo

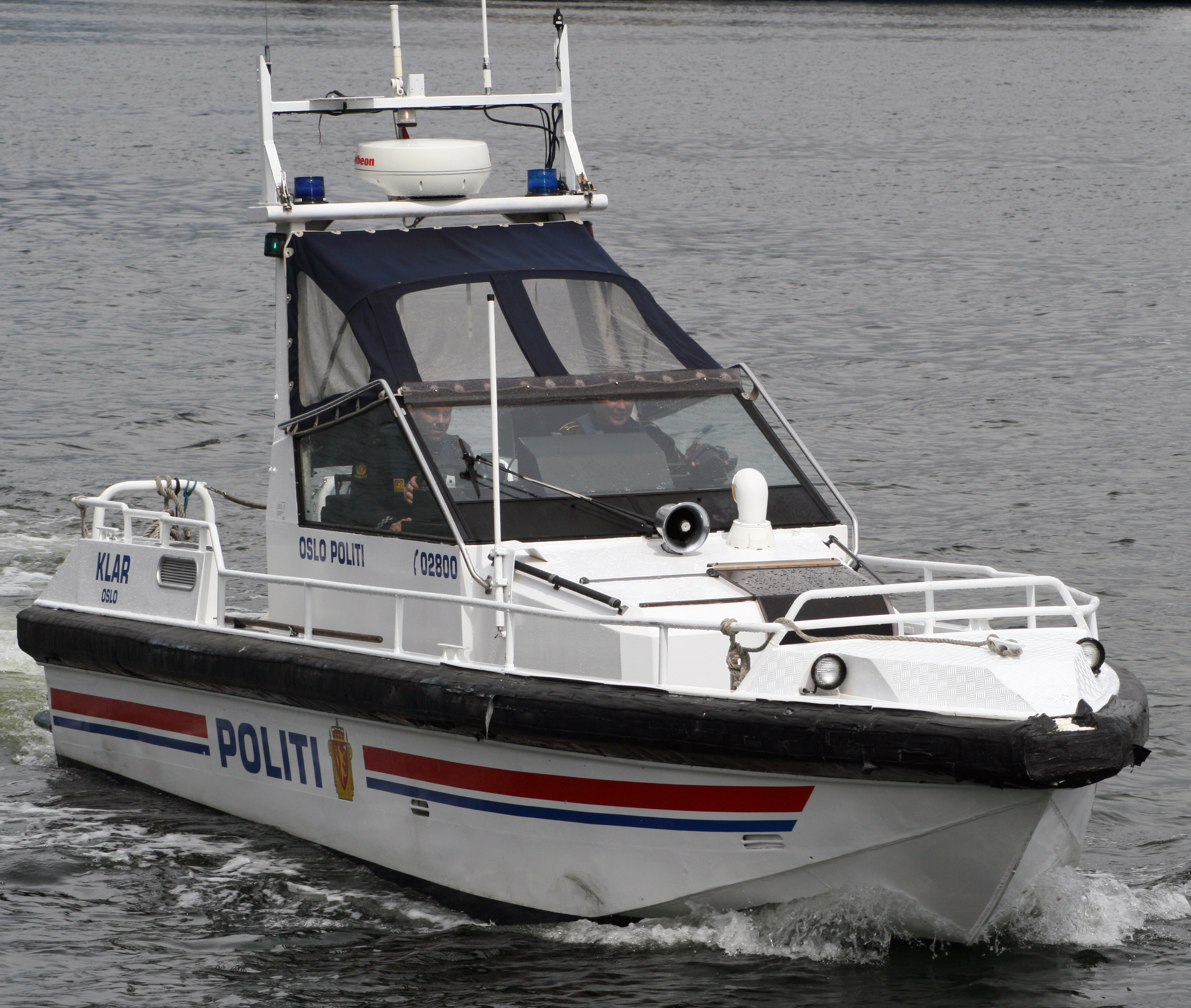
Harbour police in Oslo

== See also ==
- Police Services at Oslo Airport, Gardermoen
- Norwegian Police Service
- National Criminal Investigation Service (Norway)
- National Police Immigration Service (Norway)
- List of police districts in Norway
