= Joint Rescue Coordination Centre of Northern Norway =

Norwegian search and rescue coordination centre

- Hovedredningssentralen i Nord-Norge

Agency overview
- Formed: 1970
- Jurisdiction: Norway north of the 65th parallel north
- Headquarters: Bodø
- Employees: 20
- Parent agency: Ministry of Justice and Public Security
- Website: www.hovedredningssentralen.no

The Joint Rescue Coordination Centre of Northern Norway or JRCC NN (Norwegian: Hovedredningssentralen i Nord-Norge) is a rescue coordination center located in Bodø which is responsible for coordinating major search and rescue (SAR) operations in Norway north of the 65th parallel north. Its area of operation includes Svalbard, but excludes Jan Mayen. Established in 1970, it is a government agency subordinate to the Ministry of Justice and Public Security and led by the Chief of Police of Salten Police District. The agency has twenty-three employees and has at least two rescue controllers at work at any time.

The center is able to call on resources from twenty-one police districts, land, sea and air ambulance services, fire departments, the Coast Guard, the Royal Norwegian Air Force's 330 Squadron, which operates the Westland Sea King SAR helicopters, the Norwegian Society for Sea Rescue and other governmental, commercial and volunteer resources. Communication can be relayed via Telenor Maritime Radio and Avinor's air traffic control. The rest of the country is covered by the Joint Rescue Coordination Centre of Southern Norway.

== History ==
Organized search and rescue operations in Norway were first established with the foundation of the Norwegian Society for Sea Rescue in 1891, a private, non-profit society. The service was based on solidarity and volunteering. As more public and private resources were made available for search and rescue missions, problems with coordination became evident. Thus the government appointed a commission in the mid-1950s to look into the need for a coordinating body. It made its recommendations in 1959, which were implemented in 1970. This resulted in the creation of two JRCCs, a rescue sub-center at each police district and the establishment of the 330 Squadron of Westland Sea King helicopters in 1973.

== Organization ==
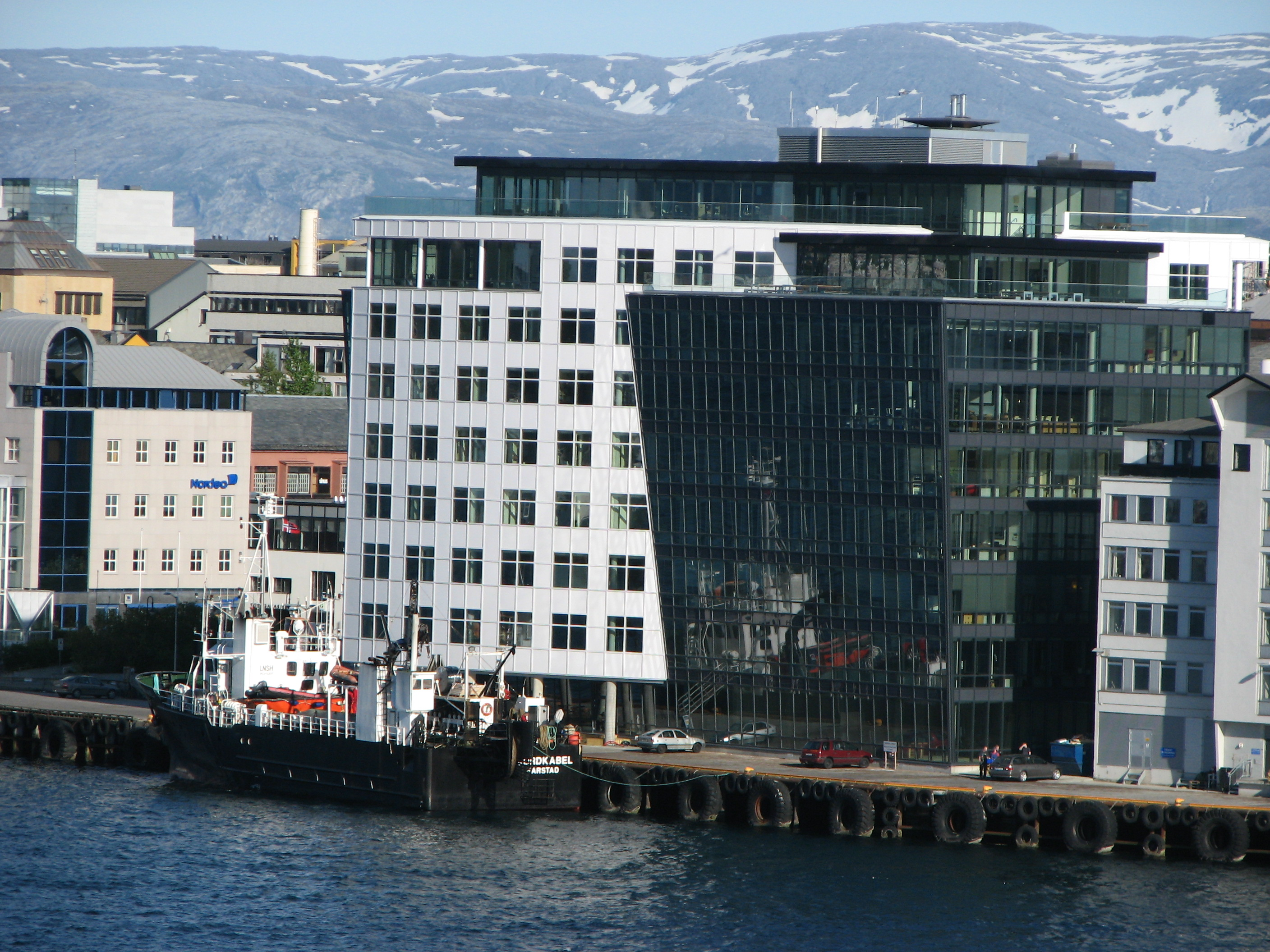
The offices are located adjacent to Telenor Maritime Radio's Bodø Radio at Jakhelln Brygge, Bodø

JRCC NN is organized as government agency subordinate to the Ministry of Justice and Public Security, and is based in Bodø. Its search and rescue region of responsibility, defined by the International Maritime Organization and International Civil Aviation Organization, covers Southern Norway—specified as following the 65th parallel north in the Norwegian Sea and the border between Nord-Trøndelag and Nordland on land. To the south lies the responsibility of the Joint Rescue Coordination Centre of Southern Norway, based in Sola. The JRCC NN's geographic borders towards neighboring countries roughly corresponds to that of Norway's exclusive economic zone (EEZ) and flight information region, with exceptions. To the west the border follows the prime meridian and extends as far north as the North Pole. To the east the border runs along the 35th meridian east south to the Russian/Norwegian border, then following this to the mainland . Thus Svalbard falls within the limits, while Jan Mayen falls outside. The zone covers parts of the Norwegian Sea, the Barents Sea, the Greenland Sea and the Arctic Ocean. There are seven rescue sub-center subordinate JCRR NN—one in each police district as well as one for Svalbard coordinated by the Governor of Svalbard.

The agency is subordinate to the Chief of Police of Salten Police District and led by a manager and two rescue inspectors, one for operations and one for planning, development and training. The facility has 14 to 16 rescue controllers, of which at least two are at any time on duty, and two to three administrative employees. The chief of police is contacted in case of major incidents, and he can choose to call in a rescue leadership group consisting of representatives from the Royal Norwegian Navy, the Royal Norwegian Air Force, Avinor's air traffic control, Nordland Hospital Trust and Telenor Maritime Radio. Rescue controllers are recruited from a range of services, including the navy, air force, air traffic control, police, merchant marine and civil aviation. The agency had 20 employees in 2013.

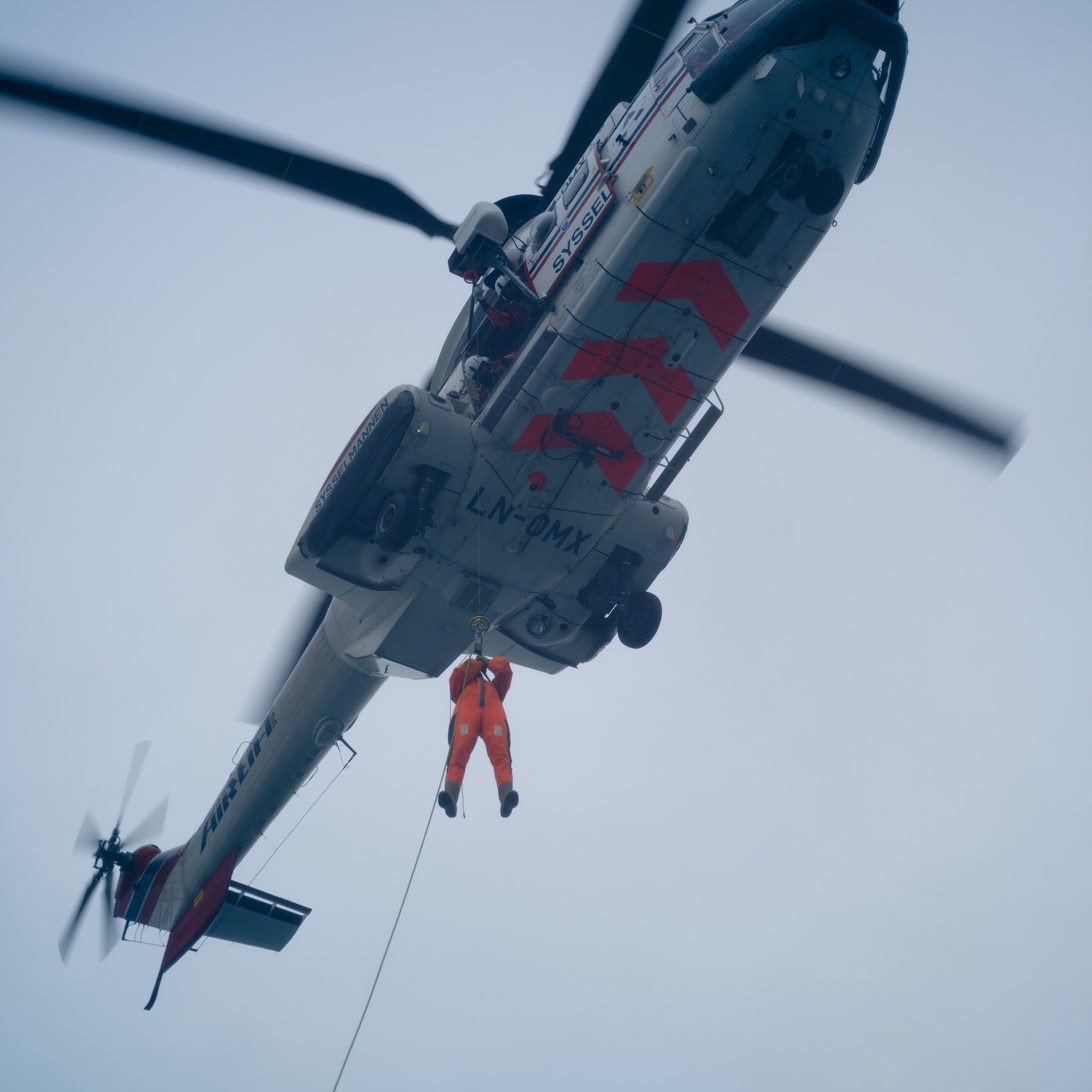
A Eurocopter AS332 Super Puma of the Governor of Svalbard conducting a SAR training exercise in Isfjorden, Svalbard

"Search and rescue service" is a judicially defined term in Norway, which specifically applies to an immediate response to saving people from death and injury. It does not involve rescue of property, protection of the environment or prevention of accidents. Most alarms are channeled through the sub-centers, which double as 1-1-2 emergency telephone number centers. Some alarms may be channeled via the coast radio stations or air traffic control. All Norwegian-registered aircraft are required to have an emergency locator transmitter connected to the Cospar-Sarsat system. JRCC SN is linked to the Global Maritime Distress Safety System, the Automated Mutual-Assistance Vessel Rescue System and Inmarsat.

The sub-centers will always report any search and rescue alarm to JRCC SN, but will by default take action themselves unless JRCC NN chooses to take command itself. Actions are taken based on pre-defined plans. JRCC NN is prepared to handle situations related to land, sea and air, operations tied to offshore constructions and missions requiring international cooperation. This model is chosen for being cost-efficient and resource-efficient, and is unique in the world. The two Norwegian JRCCs are redundant and both can take over the other centers operations if necessary. This most commonly takes place when one center is fully occupied with a major incident and the other center takes over responsibility for the entire country. In case of war the JRCC NN will cease to operate and the employees and resources will be transferred to Norwegian Joint Headquarters, with the Norwegian Armed Forces taking over available resources.

Incidents are handled at one of three levels: on-scene coordination, at a rescue sub-center or at a JRCC. Most land-based SAR missions are coordinated at the second level by the local police district. However, the JRCC is kept informed and may offer advice and allocate resources without coordinating the mission. The JRCCs take over control in situation at sea, by aircraft and at offshore installations, as well as for instances which require international cooperation and prolonged operations. The JRCC may appoint an on-scene coordinator for a search, typically a navy or coast guard vessel. For major accidents, hotlines for next of kin are set up, and crisis psychology and clergy is available to these and search participants. Professional public relations experts are used to handle the media.

== Resources ==
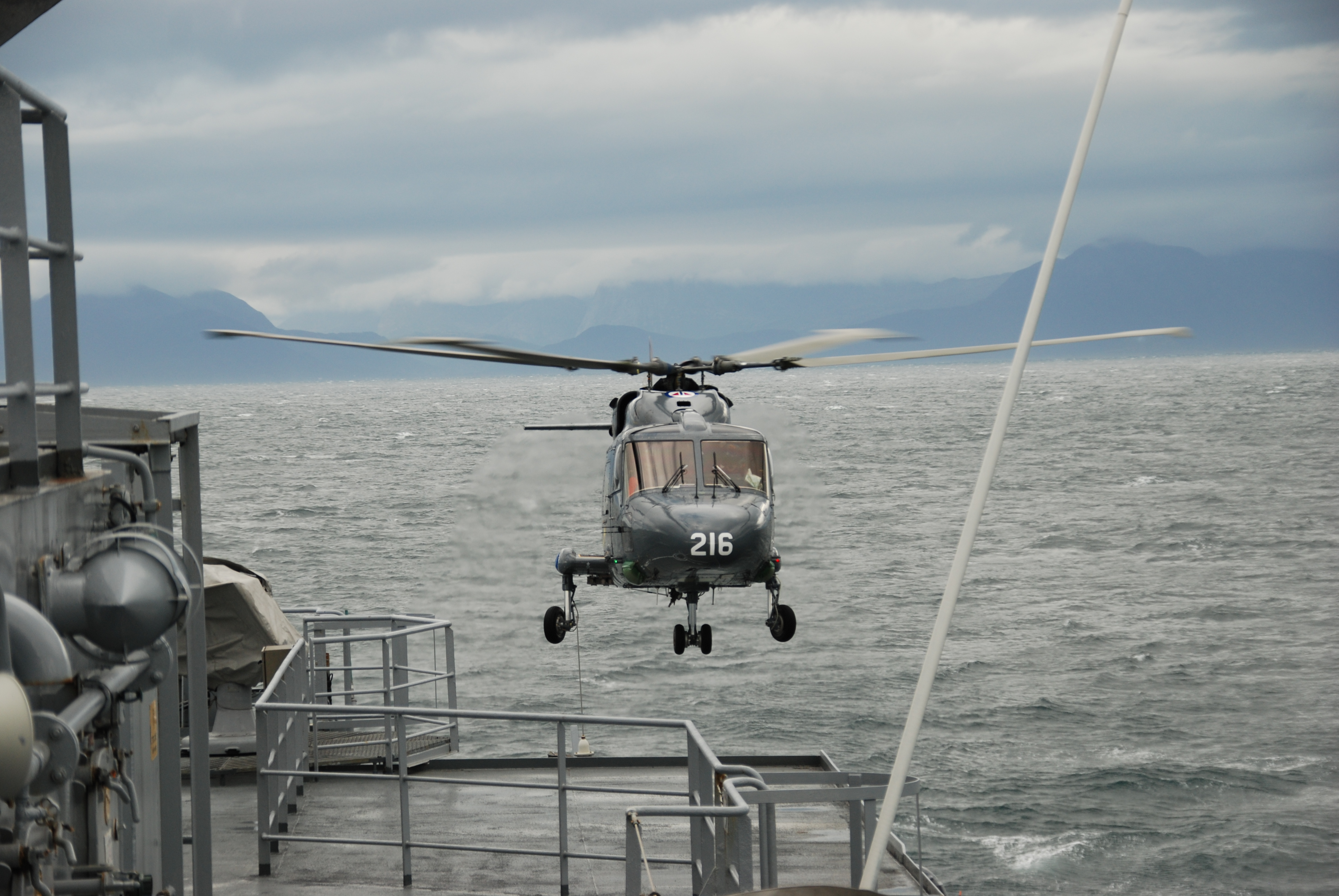
Westland Lynx landing on the Nordkapp-class offshore patrol vessel Senja of the Norwegian Coast Guard

Available resources for search and rescue missions are a pooling of government, commercial and volunteer agencies. Government agencies cover their costs related to SAR missions through their ordinary operational budgets. Volunteer organizations are reimbursed their direct costs. Civilian governmental organizations which JRCC SN can call upon are the Norwegian Police Service, ambulances, the Norwegian Air Ambulance, municipal fire departments and the fire and rescue services at airports. The Coastal Administration, the Climate and Pollution Agency and the Directorate of Fisheries operate a fleet of vessels along the coast. Advice can be called from the Norwegian Geotechnical Institute and the Norwegian Meteorological Institute.

Military resources available include the Air Force's 330 Squadron which operates twelve Westland Sea King helicopters dedicated to search and rescue and air ambulance services, which operate out of Ørland Main Air Station, Bodø Main Air Station and Station Group Banak in Northern Norway. The air force can also provide P-3 Orion observation aircraft, C-130 Hercules transport aircraft and Westland Lynx helicopters if necessary. The Coast Guard operates a network of 14 vessels along the coast, for which search and rescue is a primary duty. The largest Nordkapp and Barentshav class offshore patrol vessels are capable of carrying Lynx helicopters. The navy, army and home guard are also able to assist. The Governor of Svalbard also has a series of vehicles and crew at his disposal.

Volunteer resources included the Norwegian Civil Defence, the Norwegian Red Cross Search and Rescue Corps and the Norwegian People's Aid. The Norwegian Society for Sea Rescue operates a fleet of smaller rescue vessels along the coast. Specialist organizations are called upon for certain tasks, such as the Norwegian Speleological Society for extracting people from caves, Alpine rescue groups, Norwegian Rescue Dogs and the Norwegian Radio Relay League. Commercial resources which can be called upon include the Industrial Civil Defence, which consists of emergency response teams at companies, offshore oil operators and civilian helicopter operators.
