= Agder Police District =

Agder Police District _{Agder politidistrikt}

Agency overview
- Formed: 2002
- Employees: 676

Jurisdictional structure
- Operations jurisdiction: Agder (except Sirdal Municipality), Norway
- General nature: Local civilian police

Operational structure
- Overseen by: National Police Directorate
- Headquarters: Kristiansand Police Station
- Agency executive: Kirsten Lindeberg, Chief of Police

Facilities
- Politistasjon / Lensmannskontors: 27

Website
- https://www.politi.no/agder

Agder Police District (Norwegian: Agder politidistrikt) covers the county of Agder except Sirdal Municipality in Norway, approximately 14,880 square kilometres (5,750 sq mi). The district is headquartered in Kristiansand and consists of five police stations located in Kristiansand, Flekkefjord, Mandal, Grimstad, and Arendal. There are also thirteen sheriff's offices (Norwegian: lensmannskontor). Stays and immigration cases are processed at the headquarters in Kristiansand. In the police district are approximately 280,000 inhabitants. Agder Police District was established on 1 January 2002 by a merger of the former police districts of Vest-Agder, Kristiansand, and Arendal.

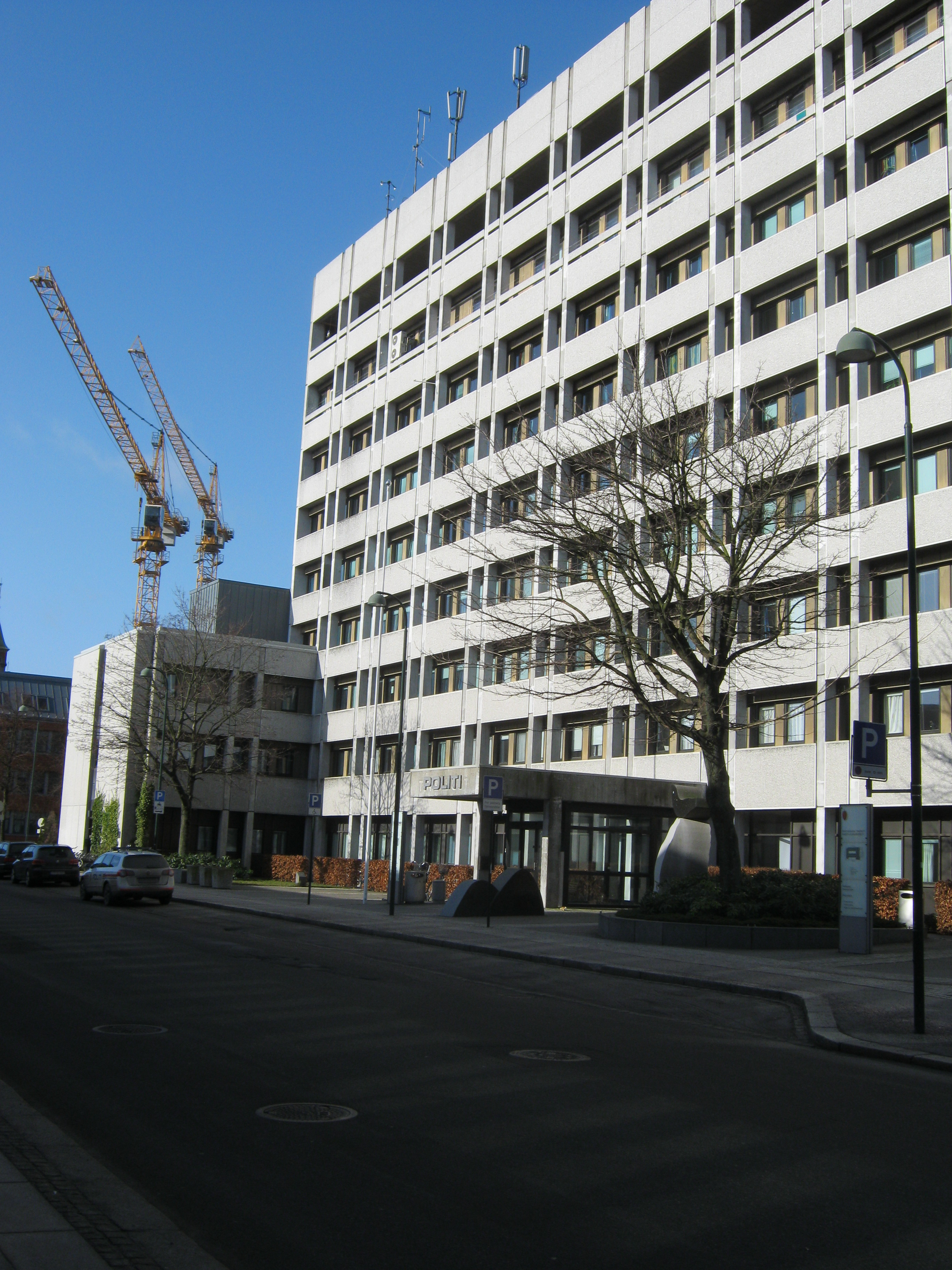
Agder Police Headquarters in Kristiansand

The easiest way to contact the police in Agder is by telephone, emergency ☎ 112, non-emergency calls at ☎ 02800 or ☎ (+47) 38 13 60 00.

== History ==
In 2022, the police district apologized in regard to the mistakes made during the investigation of Baneheia murders; the murders were in 2000.

== See also ==
- Norwegian Police Service
