= Østfold Police District =

Agency overview
- Formed: 2002
- Dissolved: 2016

Jurisdictional structure
- Operations jurisdiction: Østfold, Østfold, Norway
- General nature: Local civilian police

Operational structure
- Overseen by: National Police Directorate
- Headquarters: Sarpsborg Police Headquarters
- Agency executive: Beate Gangås, Chief of Police

Facilities
- Politistasjon / Lensmannskontors: 10

Website
- https://www.politi.no/ostfold

Østfold Police District (Norwegian: Østfold politidistrikt) was a police district headquartered in Sarpsborg, Norway, serving the municipalities of Aremark, Fredrikstad, Halden, Hvaler, Marker, Moss, Rakkestad, Rygge, Rømskog, Råde, Sarpsborg and Våler. Other municipalities in Østfold county belonged to Follo Police District. The police district is on the border with Sweden.

The district had police stations in Sarpsborg, Fredrikstad, Halden and Moss and six sheriff's offices (lensmannskontor).

In 2016, Østfold Police District merged with Follo Police District and Romerike Police District to form East Police District.

== See also ==
- Norwegian Police Service
