= Romerike Police District =

Agency overview
- Formed: 1894
- Dissolved: 2016
- Employees: 651
- Annual budget: 424 million kr

Jurisdictional structure
- Operations jurisdiction: Romerike, Akershus, Norway
- General nature: Local civilian police

Operational structure
- Overseen by: National Police Directorate
- Headquarters: Lillestrøm Police Station
- Agency executive: Jørgen L. Høidahl, Chief of Police

Facilities
- Stations: 11

Website
- https://www.politi.no/romerike

Romerike Police District (Norwegian: Romerike politidistrikt) was one of the 27 police districts in Norway, covering the Romerike district of Akershus until 2016. The district was headquartered in Lillestrøm and consisted of two police stations, at Lillestrøm and Gardermoen (at Oslo Airport, Gardermoen), and nine sheriff's offices. It was led by Chief of Police Jørgen L. Høidahl.

The police district specifically covered the municipalities of Aurskog-Høland, Sørum, Fet, Rælingen, Lørenskog, Skedsmo, Nittedal, Gjerdrum, Ullensaker, Nes, Eidsvoll, Nannestad, Hurdal. As of 2011, it had 651 employees and held a special responsibility for the border control at Oslo Airport, Gardermoen.

In 2016, Romerike Police District was merged with Follo Police District and Østfold Police District to form East Police District.

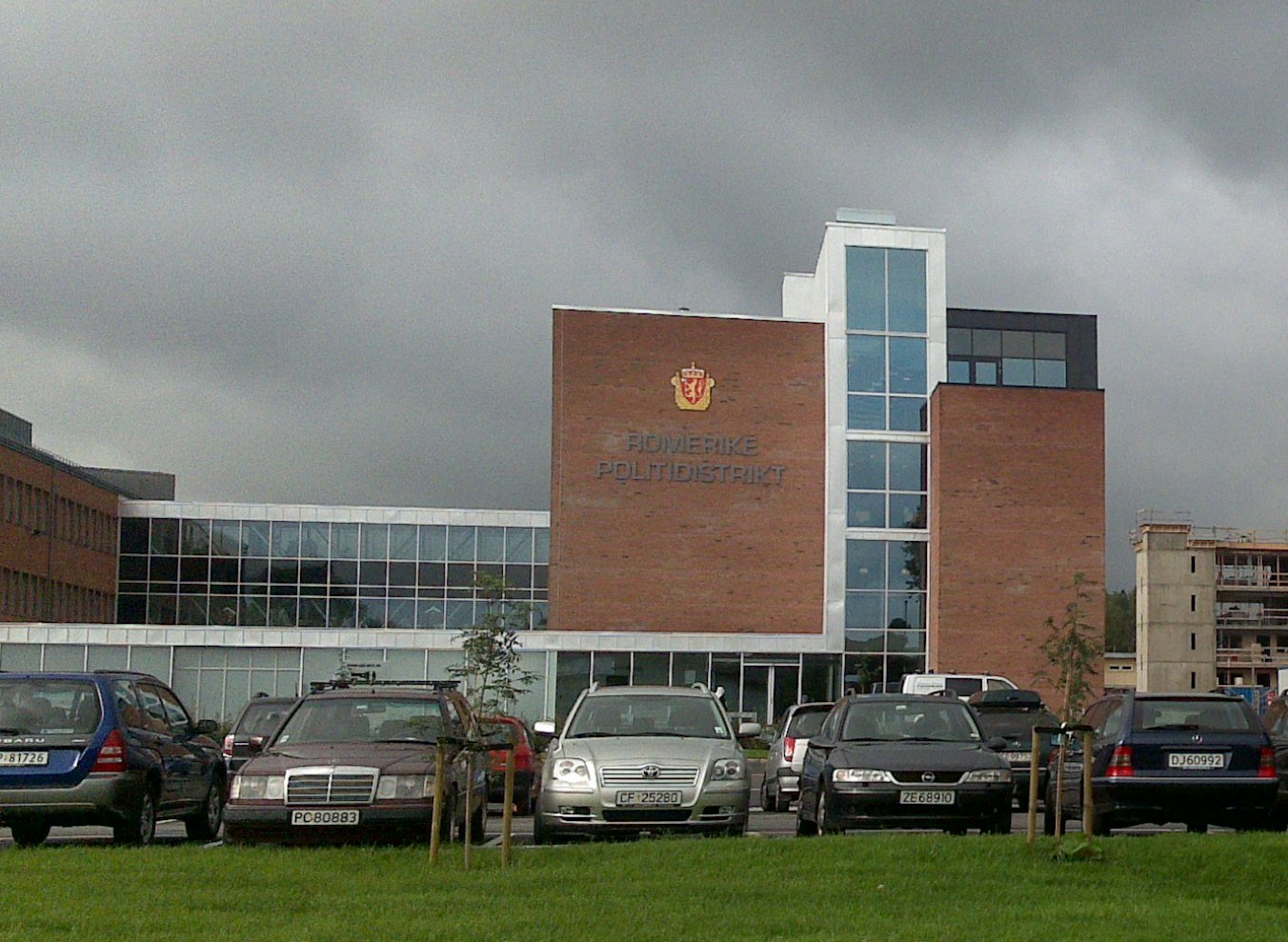
Lillestrøm Police Station
