= Reindeer Police =

Special branch of the Norwegian Police Service

The Reindeer Police (Norwegian: Reinpolitiet) is a special branch of the Norwegian Police Service. Established in 1949 it is a subdivision of Eastern Finnmark Police District. The Reindeer Police is responsible for security, law enforcement etc. related to reindeer herding activities of the Sámi, and is also responsible for preventing and handling environmental crime. They operate in the counties of Troms and Finnmark.

== See also ==
- Alaska Reindeer Service
