= Norwegian Red Cross Search and Rescue Corps =

Hjelpekorps logo

The Norwegian Red Cross Search and Rescue Corps or the NRCSRC/SRC (Norwegian: Norges Røde Kors Hjelpekorps) was created in 1932 as a support for civil society in the event of war, and particularly with gas attacks in other cities.

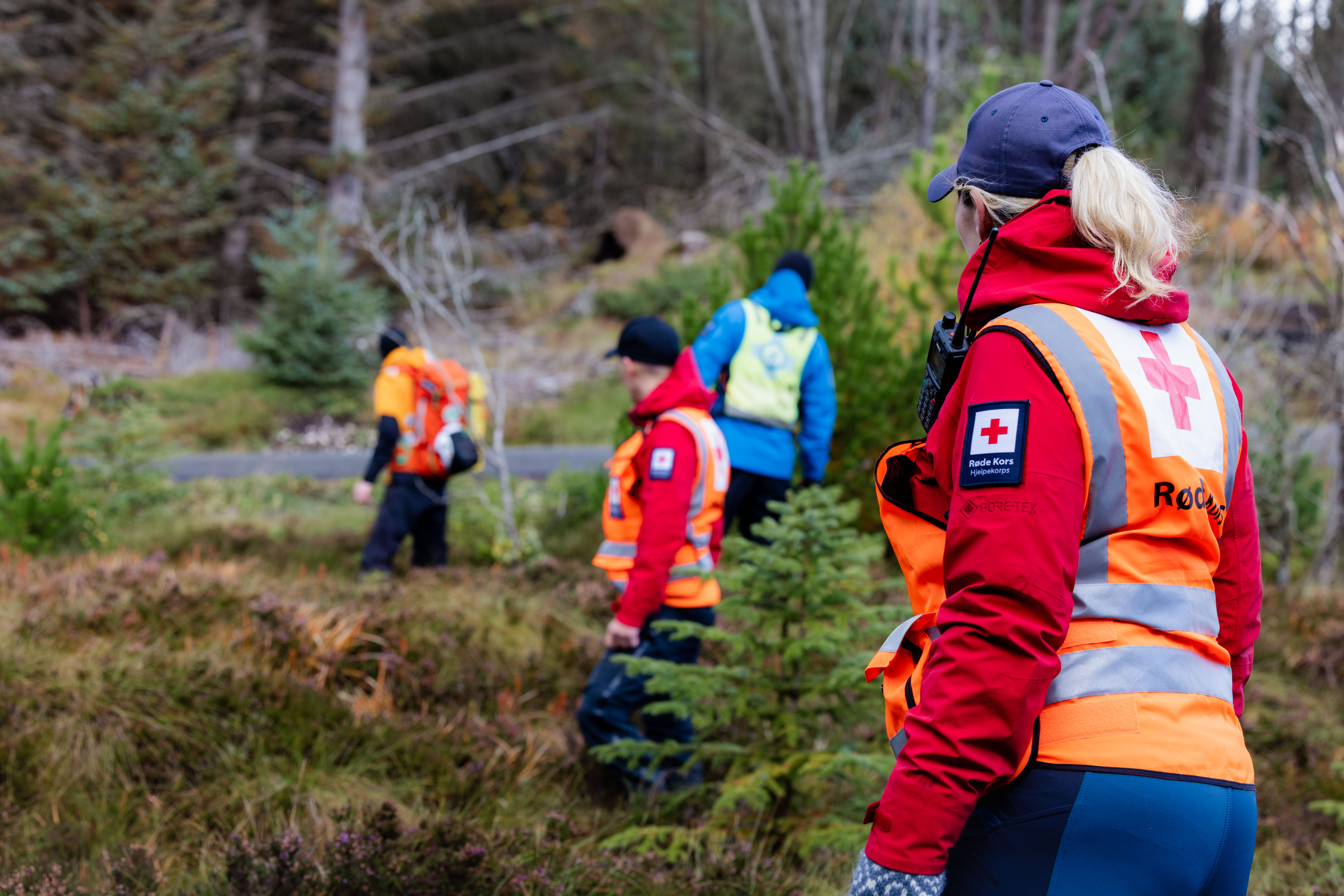
NRCSRC rescue dog training

A NRCSRC vehicle that was involved in rescue operations after the Hummelfjell Accident, here on display during a light festival in Oslo in 2026.

Today, there are over 300 local Search and Rescue Corps around in the country with over 6000 members. All members are qualified in search and rescue, and First Aid. The NRCSRC is one of the biggest agencies in Norway doing voluntary rescue operations. Norway's entire rescue service is based on volunteerism. There is a professional rescue service, but this is reserved and often not enough to carry out the assignment.

The NRCSRC main task is to assist various national agencies: for example, assist police in the search for missing persons, assist the medical service to help an injured person down from a mountain, or assist the Joint Rescue Coordinating Center to locate and assist lost persons in bad weather. In addition, the corps gives medical manpower to various events in the community (e. g. concerts, soccer matches), doing first aid instruction, and in some locations ambulance services to relieve the local ambulance from transportation of a non-critical patient.

== Education ==
Anyone who wants to be an active member in the corps must complete a basic Red Cross course. They can then participate as an aspirant. When they have completed their full training in First Aid, Radio Communications, and a basic course in Search and Rescue, they are qualified members.

All members must pass a practical and theoretical examination in First Aid and do a reassessment of all subjects every three years.

To be included in search and rescue operations, it is also required to train or have documented skills in outdoor activities, and search methods for summer and winter conditions. In addition, there are courses in water rescue, rescue in difficult terrain, the avalanche rescue, communications, advanced first aid, make-up and the cursor service, management, psychological first aid, ambulance and more.
