= Troms Police District =

Troms Police District

Agency overview
- Formed: 2002
- Employees: Approx. 300

Jurisdictional structure
- Operations jurisdiction: Troms, Troms, Norway
- General nature: Local civilian police

Operational structure
- Overseen by: National Police Directorate
- Headquarters: Tromsø Police Headquarters
- Agency executive: Astrid Nilsen, Chief of Police

Facilities
- Politistasjon / Lensmannskontors: 11

Website
- https://www.politi.no/troms

Troms Police District in Norway includes seventeen municipalities in Troms county with approximately 122,000 people and is headquartered in Tromsø. Troms Police Distrikt covers Troms county except Central Hålogaland.

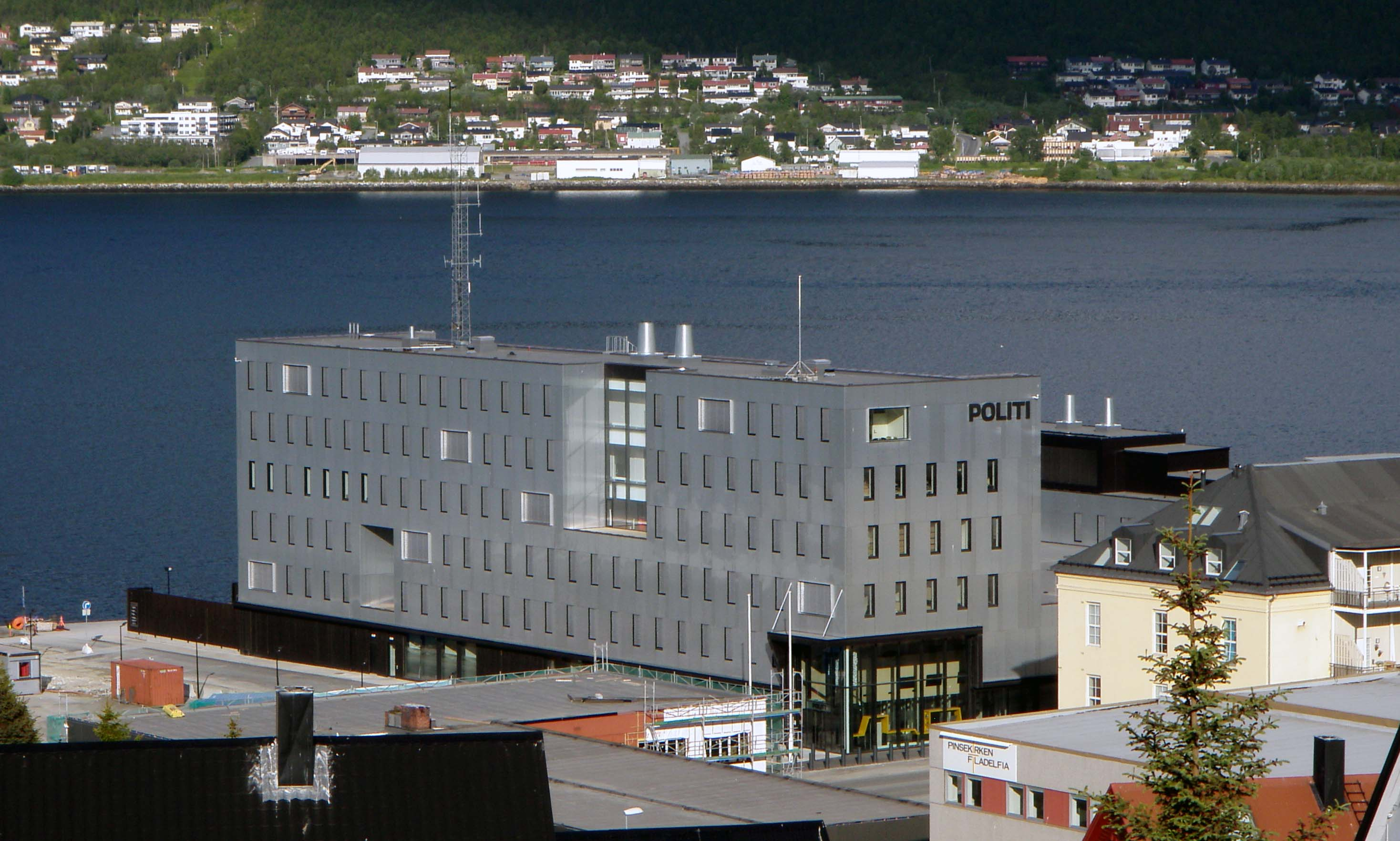
The newly built Tromsø Police Headquarters (2015)

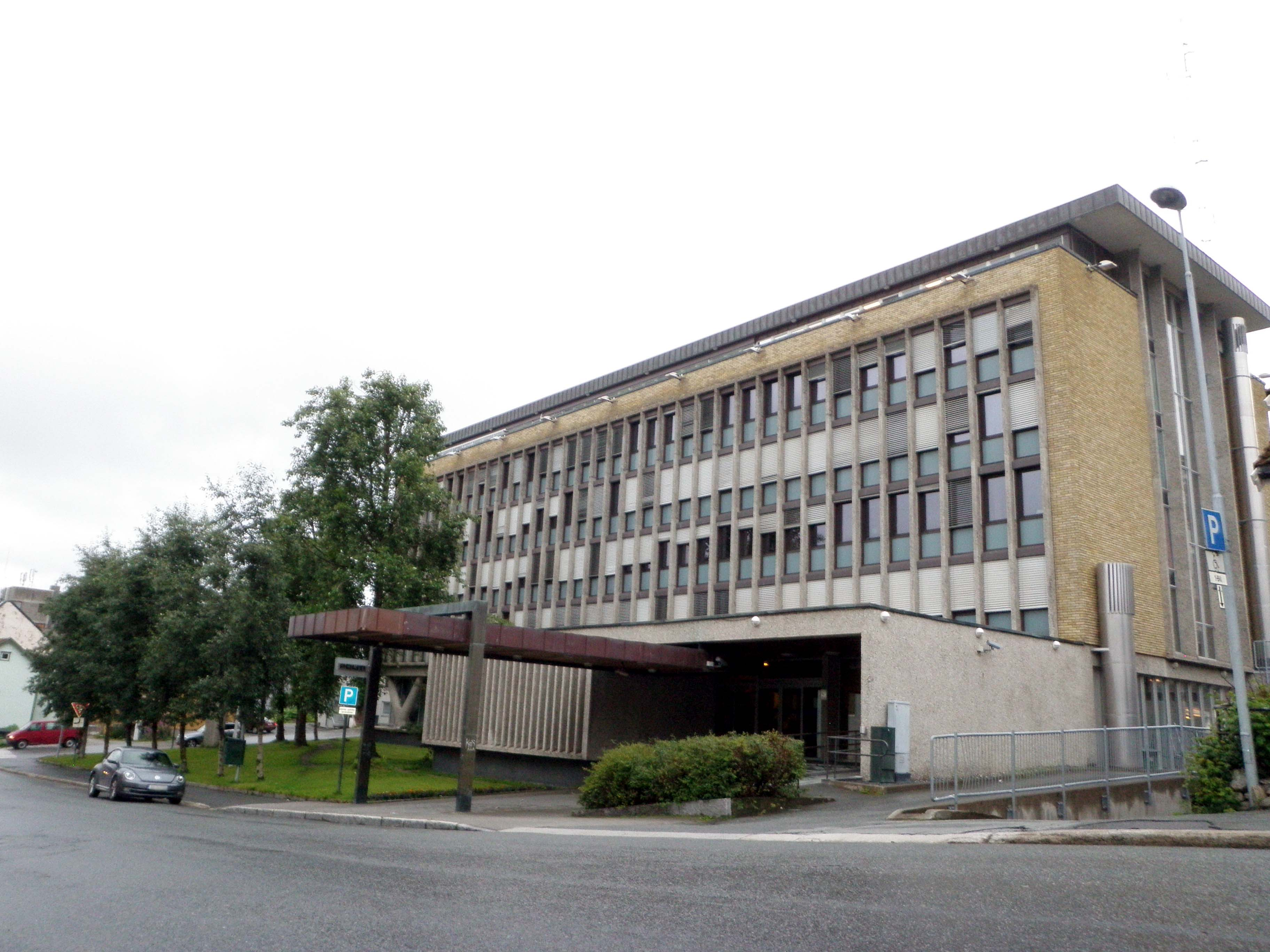
The old Tromsø Police Headquarters (2013)

== See also ==
- Norwegian Police Service
