= Ken Lay (police officer) =

Australian police officer; Chief Commissioner of Victoria Police (born 1956)

Ken Lay AO, APM

14th Lieutenant-Governor of Victoria
- In office 9 November 2017 – 12 November 2021
- Monarch: Elizabeth II
- Governor: Linda Dessau
- Preceded by: Marilyn Warren
- Succeeded by: James Angus

21st Chief Commissioner of Victoria Police
- In office 14 November 2011 – 31 January 2015
- Governor: Alex Chernov
- Preceded by: Simon Overland
- Succeeded by: Graham Ashton

Personal details
- Born: 17 February 1956 (age 70) Korumburra, Victoria, Australia
- Education: Monash University
- Occupation: Police officer

Kenneth Douglas Lay, AO, APM (born 17 February 1956) is a former Australian police officer and Chief Commissioner of Victoria Police from 2011 to 2015. He was Lieutenant-Governor of Victoria from November 2017 to November 2021.

== Early life ==
Lay was born and raised in the town of Korumburra in Victoria's South Gippsland region.

== Police career ==
Lay joined Victoria Police in 1974, serving in Melbourne at Prahran before being stationed in regional Victoria including as an Inspector in his home town.

In 2003, Lay was appointed chief of staff to Chief Commissioner Christine Nixon, then promoted to Assistant Commissioner for North-West Victoria in 2005, Assistant Commissioner (Traffic and Transit Safety) in 2008. In 2009, he became Deputy Commissioner (Road Policing)—Victoria's top "traffic cop".

In October 2009, Lay was photographed by a speed camera driving 10 kilometres per hour (6.2 mph) over the speed limit through the town of Tooborac. He kept the speeding offence under wraps due to concern about undermining a Christmas road-toll campaign, but admitted his error to Chief Commissioner Simon Overland. Lay announced the speeding offence publicly in January 2010.

When Overland resigned as Chief Commissioner in June 2011, Lay was made Acting Chief Commissioner. On 14 November 2011, Premier Ted Baillieu and Police Minister Peter Ryan announced that Lay had been formally appointed as Victoria Police's Chief Commissioner.

On 29 December 2014, Lay announced he was resigning as Chief Commissioner due to his wife's illness. His resignation formally took effect on 31 January 2015; however, he took leave between the announcement and his formal resignation. Deputy Chief Commissioner Tim Cartwright acted in the role until Graham Ashton was appointed as the new Chief Commissioner.

== Family violence work ==
Upon his resignation, Lay was recognised for his contribution to raising awareness of family violence and the destructive attitudes of some men towards women. Senior Sergeant Ron Iddles, the Secretary of the Police Association, commented that "putting family violence on the front page would be Lay's legacy" and "because of his attitude, we now have a Royal Commission which will look into family violence. The Premier commended Lay for "both his advocacy for the prevention of family violence and in challenging all men to call out inappropriate behaviour against women The Police Minister, Wade Noonan observed that "central to his (Lay's) proud legacy will be his action on Family Violence. He, above all others, put this squarely on the public agenda.

In a speech to Parliament, the Police Minister said, "Ken's willingness to place himself at the centre of our community's quest to prevent family violence and violence against women will be his most enduring legacy. He called men to account for inappropriate behaviour towards women, and his advocacy led to Labor's commitment to establish Australia's first Royal Commission into Family Violence".

== Post police career ==
On 28 January 2015, Lay was appointed as the Chair of the Council of Australian Government's Advisory Council on Family Violence. Later that year he was appointed as the Chair of the Prime Minister's Ice Taskforce. In 2016, he was appointed to the Board of the Essendon Football Club.

Until September 2016, he was a Director of the Greyhound Racing Board after the previous board stood down shortly after a widely publicised "live baiting" scandal. He was appointed to the Board of Dixon Hospitality (DHL) in 2016 and as Chair of the Ambulance Victoria Board in January 2016. In 2018, he was appointed as a director of the National Heavy Vehicle Regulator.

Lay was awarded an Honorary Doctorate of Laws by Monash University in 2015. In 2017, Lay was appointed an Officer of the Order of Australia for distinguished service to law enforcement as Chief Commissioner of Victoria Police, through structural reforms to recruitment, training and deployment, and to social and community leadership.

On 9 November 2017, Lay was sworn in as Lieutenant-Governor of Victoria by Governor Linda Dessau, following the retirement of Marilyn Warren as Lieutenant-Governor and Chief Justice of Victoria.

== Honours and awards ==

Officer of the Order of Australia (AO)	26 January 2017	Australia Day Honours. For distinguished service to law enforcement as Chief Commissioner of Police in Victoria, through structural reforms to recruitment, training and deployment, and to social and community leadership
Australian Police Medal (APM)	11 June 2007	Queen's Birthday Honours
National Police Service Medal		
National Medal & Bar		

Police appointments
Preceded by Simon Overland	Chief Commissioner of Victoria Police; 2011–2015	Succeeded by Graham Ashton
Government offices
Preceded by Marilyn Warren	Lieutenant-Governor of Victoria; 2017–2021	Succeeded by James Angus
