= Shane Patton =

Australian police officer

Shane Patton APM
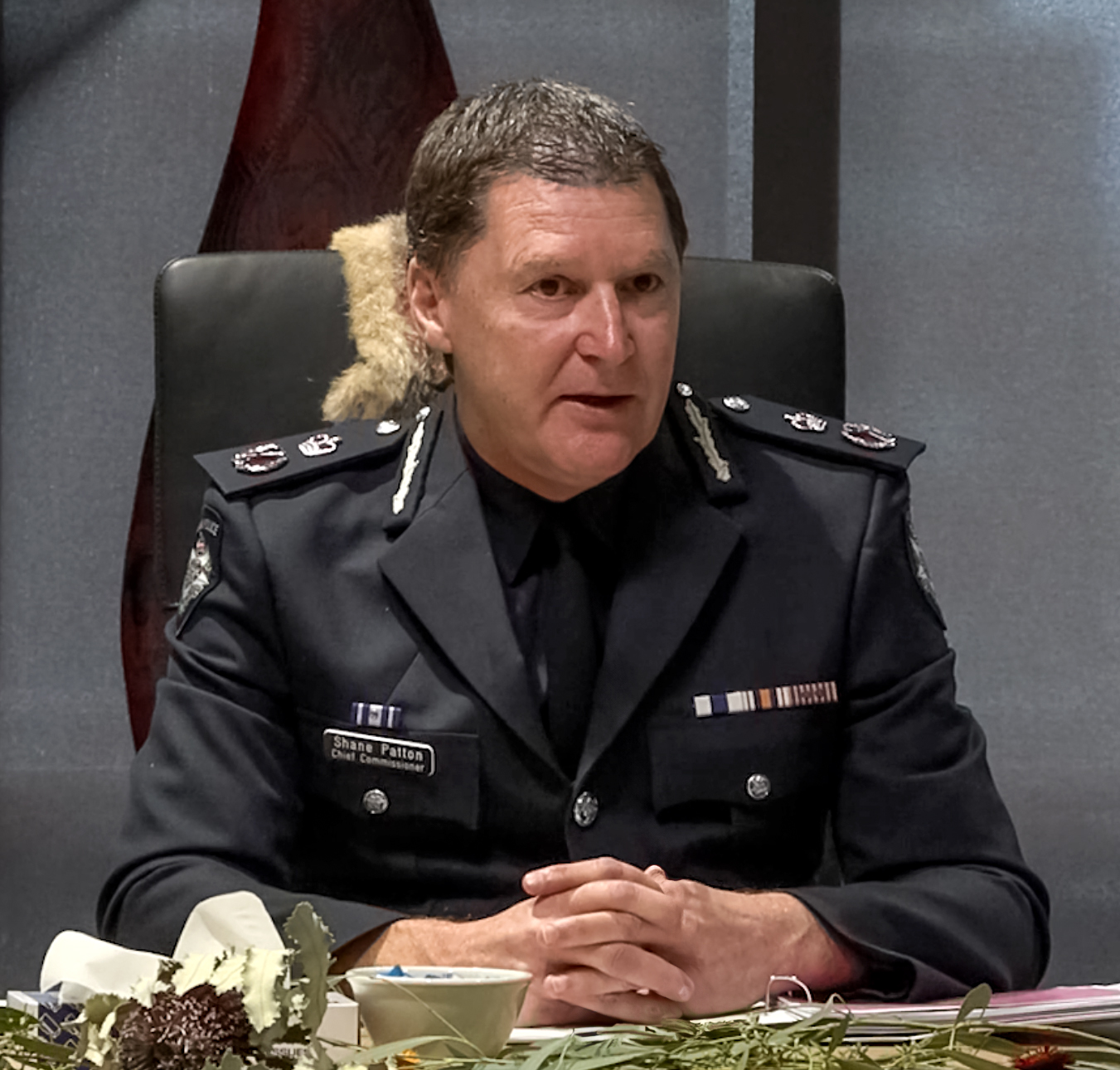

23rd Chief Commissioner of Victoria Police
- In office 27 June 2020 – 16 February 2025
- Preceded by: Graham Ashton
- Succeeded by: Rick Nugent (acting); Mike Bush

Personal details
- Born: Shane Andrew Patton; 1961 or 1962 (age 64–65)
- Occupation: Police officer

Shane Andrew Patton APM (born 1961 or 1962) is an Australian police officer who served as the Chief Commissioner of Victoria Police from June 2020 until February 2025, when he resigned following a no-confidence vote by the police union against his leadership.

Patton grew up in regional Victoria and joined Victoria Police in 1978. Part of his early career was spent at St Kilda Criminal Investigation Branch (CIB) in the 1980s. Other roles have been in general duties, detective work, police prosecutor, ethical standards investigation, transit and education, as well as acting as chief of staff for Simon Overland whilst Overland was Chief Commissioner. Patton was appointed Deputy Commissioner in September 2015 and was made Chief Commissioner on 27 June 2020.

In the 2015 Australia Day Honours, Patton was awarded the Australian Police Medal.

Police appointments
Preceded by Graham Ashton	Chief Commissioner of Victoria Police; 2020–2025	Succeeded by Mike Bush
