= Marilyn Warren =

Australian judge (born 1951)

The Honourable Marilyn Warren AC KC

11th Chief Justice of Victoria
- In office 25 November 2003 – 1 October 2017
- Appointed by: Rob Hulls
- Preceded by: John Phillips
- Succeeded by: Anne Ferguson

13th Lieutenant-Governor of Victoria
- In office 7 April 2006 – 8 November 2017
- Governor: David de Kretser; Alex Chernov; Linda Dessau
- Preceded by: Lady Southey
- Succeeded by: Ken Lay

Judge of the Supreme Court of Victoria
- In office 13 October 1998 – 1 October 2017

Personal details
- Born: 1951 (age 74–75) Melbourne, Victoria, Australia
- Education: Monash University

Marilyn Louise Warren AC KC (born 1951) is a former chief justice of the Supreme Court of Victoria and lieutenant-governor of Victoria, Australia.

== Early life ==
Warren grew up in the Melbourne suburb of Sandringham, and was educated at the Kilbreda Convent in Mentone. She later studied law at Monash University, graduating B.Juris (Bachelor of Jurisprudence) and LL.B. (Hons) (Bachelor of Laws with Honours) in 1973 and 1974 respectively and Master of Laws in 1983. In April 2004, she was made an honorary Doctor of Laws by Monash University. Warren was a champion squash player, winning the university's women's championship ten years in a row. She also represented the State of Victoria three times, in a team which won the Australian championships three years running.

== Professional career ==
Warren completed her articles of clerkship with a solicitor for the Government of Victoria as the first female articled clerk in public service in Victoria. After her admission to practise in 1975, Warren worked as a solicitor in the government sector until 1985, during which time she served as Deputy Secretary of the Law Department of Victoria, and was a senior policy adviser to three attorneys-general of Victoria, namely Haddon Storey QC, John Cain and Jim Kennan SC. She was called to the Victorian Bar in 1985 and practiced as a barrister in areas such as commercial and administrative law. From 1986 to 1994, Warren was a member of the Law Reform Committee of the Victorian Bar. On 25 November 1997, Warren was appointed a QC.

== Judicial office ==
On 13 October 1998, Warren was appointed a judge in the Trial Division of the Supreme Court of Victoria. A representative of the Victorian Bar, giving Warren the customary welcome to new judges, said "We at the Bar look forward to the days of the Warren Supreme Court in this State," alluding to the high reputation of the Supreme Court of the United States under Earl Warren, and recognising Warren's own talent. As a judge, Warren presided over cases in all of the court's lists, but particularly the Commercial List, of which she was the judge in charge from 2000.

Warren was appointed chief justice of the Supreme Court (thus becoming chief justice of Victoria) on 25 November 2003. She is the first female chief justice in any of the states and territories of Australia. At her ceremonial welcome to that office, the attorney-general of Victoria, Rob Hulls, recognised Warren's work in advocating equality of opportunity for women lawyers, and described her as "an eminent jurist, [who] will be an unparalleled and inspirational leader of this Court." Warren retired on 1 October 2017, and was succeeded by Anne Ferguson.

Warren was also lieutenant-governor of Victoria (2006–2017), president of the Victorian Law Foundation, chair of the Judicial College of Victoria, chair of the Council of Legal Education, chair of the Victorian Institute of Forensic Medicine, chair of the Courts Council of Victoria, and chair of the Judicial Commission of Victoria.

== Academic career ==
In January 2018, Warren was appointed a Vice-Chancellor's Professorial Fellow at Monash University, Victoria, Australia.

== Honours ==
- Queen's Counsel in and for the State of Victoria (1997)
- Companion of the Order of Australia (2005) for service to the judiciary and to the legal profession particularly the delivery and administration of law in Victoria, to the community in areas affecting the social and economic conditions of women and to forensic medicine internationally.
- Monash University Distinguished Alumni of the Year (2014)

== Leading cases ==
Leading cases or judgements handed down by Warren include:

- Bayley Walk Pty Ltd v Bayley Views Pty Ltd [2006] VSC 213 – Mareva orders
- Kane Constructions Pty Ltd v Sopov [2005] VSC 237 – repudiation of contracts and unjust enrichment
- Re: OG, a lawyer [2007] VSC 520 – striking off legal practitioner
- Kirkland-Veenstra v Stuart & Ors [2008] VCA – public authority liability

== Personal life ==
Warren chooses to ride a bicycle to work when she can, despite the fact that her job comes with a chauffeur, and she is a regular bushwalker. She is also apparently known for playing Tchaikovsky's 1812 Overture at high volume while travelling between courts.

== See also ==
- Judiciary of Australia
- List of judges of the Supreme Court of Victoria

Legal offices
Preceded by John Harber Phillips	Chief Justice of the Supreme Court of Victoria; 2003–2017	Succeeded by Anne Ferguson
Government offices
Preceded by Lady Southey	Lieutenant-Governor of Victoria; 2006–2017	Succeeded by Ken Lay
