= List of chief commissioners of the Victoria Police =

The chief commissioner of the Victoria Police is the highest-ranking police officer in the Australian state of Victoria. The chief commissioner serves as the primary liaison between Victoria Police, government agencies, and relevant government ministers, and is appointed by the governor of Victoria.

The 1853 Police Regulation Act established the role of chief commissioner, which was first held by Sir William Mitchell. The chief commissioner acts as the chief executive officer and chief constable of Victoria Police, and reports to the minister for police. Under the Victoria Police Act 2013, the chief commissioner has to implement relevant policy and law of the government within the police force, advising and informing the police minister on the operations of the police force, and is responsible for general conduct, performance and operations of Victoria Police. The role is supported by a number of departments, each led by a deputy commissioner responsible for the following areas: regional operations, specialist operations, public safety and security, and capability. The candidate for the role is typically chosen on the advice of the sitting premier of Victoria. The chief commissioner can be appointed for a maximum term of five years and may be reappointed after their five year term expires.

Victoria Police may, in some circumstances, have an acting chief commissioner in place when a chief commissioner has retired and a permanent replacement is being sought. The longest-serving chief commissioner was Frederick Standish, who served from 3 September 1858 to 1 October 1880 for a total term of 22 years and 28 days. The shortest-serving chief commissioner was the inaugural holder of the office, Sir William Mitchell, who served from 3 January 1853 to 24 January 1854 for a total term of 1 year and 21 days in office. The only woman to hold the office was Christine Nixon. She was also Australia's first female police commissioner. The current chief commissioner, Mike Bush will start in the role on 27 June 2025.

== List of chief commissioners ==
List of chief commissioners of the Victoria Police from 1853 – till date.
No.	Portrait	Name	Term began	Term ended	Time in office	Notes
1	Portrait of Sir William Mitchell	Sir William Mitchell	3 January 1853	24 January 1854	1 year, 21 days	
2	Portrait of Sir Charles MacMahon	Sir Charles MacMahon	15 February 1854	17 July 1858	4 years, 152 days	
3	Portrait of Frederick Standish	Frederick Standish	3 September 1858	1 October 1880	22 years, 28 days	
4	Portrait of Hussey Chomley	Hussey Chomley	6 March 1882	27 March 1902	20 years, 21 days	
5	Portrait of Thomas O'Callaghan	Thomas O'Callaghan	1 April 1902	31 March 1913	10 years, 364 days	
6	Portrait of Alfred Sainsbury	Alfred Sainsbury; JP	1 April 1913	28 February 1919	5 years, 333 days	
7	Portrait of Sir George Steward	Sir George Steward; KBE CMG VD JP	1 March 1919	11 May 1920	1 year, 71 days	
8	Portrait of Sir John Gellibrand	Sir John Gellibrand; KCB DSO & Bar	1 September 1920	7 February 1922	1 year, 159 days	
9	Portrait of Alexander Nicholson	Alexander Nicholson	8 February 1922	10 August 1925	3 years, 183 days	
10	Portrait of Sir Thomas Blamey	Sir Thomas Blamey; CB CMG DSO ED	1 September 1925	9 July 1936	10 years, 312 days	
11	Portrait of Alexander Duncan	Alexander Duncan; CMG	14 February 1937	30 December 1954	17 years, 319 days	
12	Portrait of Selwyn Porter	Selwyn Porter; CBE DSO LVO ED	1 January 1955	9 October 1963	8 years, 281 days	
13	Portrait of Rupert Arnold	Rupert Arnold; CBE QPM JP	15 October 1963	1 February 1969	5 years, 109 days	
14	—	Noel Wilby; LVO QPM	1 February 1969	5 October 1971	2 years, 246 days	
15	—	Reginald Jackson; CMG LVO QPM JP	12 October 1971	12 June 1977	5 years, 243 days	
16	—	Mick Miller; AO LVO QPM	13 June 1977	28 November 1987	10 years, 168 days	
17	—	Kel Glare; AO APM	29 November 1987	28 November 1992	4 years, 365 days	
18	—	Neil Comrie; AO APM	4 January 1993	9 March 2001	8 years, 64 days	
19	Portrait of Christine Nixon	Christine Nixon; AO APM	23 April 2001	27 February 2009	7 years, 310 days	
20	Portrait of Simon Overland	Simon Overland; APM	2 March 2009	16 June 2011	2 years, 106 days	
21	—	Ken Lay; AO APM	14 November 2011	31 January 2015	3 years, 78 days	
22	—	Graham Ashton; AM APM	1 July 2015	26 June 2020	4 years, 361 days	
23	Portrait of Shane Patton	Shane Patton; APM	27 June 2020	16 February 2025	4 years, 234 days	
24	Portrait of Mike Bush	Mike Bush; CNZM	27 June 2025	Incumbent	146 days	
