= Simon Overland =

Former Victoria Police Chief Commissioner

Simon Overland APM
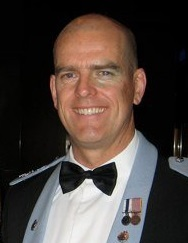

20th Chief Commissioner of Victoria Police
- In office 2 March 2009 – 16 June 2011
- Monarch: Elizabeth II
- Governor: John Landy; David de Kretser
- Preceded by: Christine Nixon
- Succeeded by: Ken Lay

Personal details
- Born: 19 March 1962 (age 64) Murray Bridge, South Australia, Australia
- Education: University of Canberra; Australian National University
- Occupation: Police officer

Simon James Overland APM (born 19 March 1962) is the former Chief Executive Officer at the City of Whittlesea and a former Chief Commissioner of Victoria Police in Australia. He previously worked with the Australian Federal Police and then with Victoria Police focusing on Melbourne's gangland wars. On 2 March 2009 he was named by the Premier, John Brumby, as Victoria Police Chief Commissioner. He resigned from this position on 16 June 2011 after intense public pressure from critics who questioned his performance. In July 2011, he was appointed the chair of the Board of Management of the Tasmania University Union and was responsible for overseeing the direction of the student union.

== Early life and education ==
Born in Murray Bridge, South Australia, Overland was raised in Canberra and attended Holder High School and Stirling College before gaining qualifications from the University of Canberra (Bachelor of Arts in Administration and a Graduate Diploma in Legal Studies) and the Australian National University (Bachelor of Laws, first class honours). He played Australian rules football in the ACT Football League for Eastlake, a total of 117 senior games. In 1985 he won the Mulrooney Medal, as the competition's best and fairest player.

== Career in law enforcement ==
With a Bachelor of Arts degree in Administration from the University of Canberra, he began his career in the Australian Federal Police (AFP) in 1984, where he worked in the taskforce which investigated the murder of AFP Assistant Commissioner Colin Winchester. He served about 19 years with the AFP; during this time he was selected by Australia's police commissioners to lead the Implementation Team that created the Australian Crime Commission in January 2003.

In January 2003, Overland was appointed Assistant Commissioner (Crime) with Victoria Police and led the Purana Taskforce on organised crime which is credited with a prominent role in bringing an end to the Melbourne gangland wars in the world of organised crime, which resulted in convictions and lengthy jail terms for underworld figures Carl Williams and Tony Mokbel.

He was the public face of Victoria Police's campaign against organised crime in Victoria and often appeared in the media speaking about the issue. He lamented that the gangland wars have appeared to desensitise the public to violence and was critical of people in the general public who took the view that we were well rid of criminals murdered in the ongoing feuds. He also insisted that criminal figures are still human beings with the right to a fair trial and who should not be murdered any more than should general members of the public.

In mid-2006 he took the position of Deputy Commissioner in Victoria Police.

He was promoted to Chief Commissioner, replacing Christine Nixon, on 2 March 2009.

He faced criticism in 2011 over failings in a police computer system, which did not alert front-line officers to the parolee status of various criminals they interacted with, allowing the parolees to kill six people. He resigned from the position on 16 June 2011.

== Crime statistics controversy ==
In 2011 there was an Ombudsman investigation into allegations that Overland willingly aided in selectively releasing crime statistics to help make the former Labor-based Brumby government appear more favourable to voters when law and order was considered a major political issue.

The Ombudsman, George Brouwer, investigated the interaction between the former government and senior police figures ahead of the release of the crime statistics on 28 October 2010. Even before the Ombudsman's report was completed, it was expected to be critical of the relationship between the Brumby government and police force.

Overland resigned on 16 June 2011, a few hours after the release of a report from the Ombudsman, which criticised the 'misleading' crime statistics he published. It was revealed that he had had a discussion the previous night with the Police Minister, Peter Ryan, who indicated to him that, if he were to resign, his resignation would be accepted. The Deputy Commissioner, Ken Lay, became acting Chief Commissioner, and by the end of 2011 officially Chief Commissioner.

== Later career ==
Simon Overland was appointed Secretary of the Tasmanian Department of Justice on 4 July 2012. He resigned after fulfilling his five-year contract on 19 July 2017.

On 21 August 2017, Overland was appointed Chief Executive Officer of the Whittlesea City Council, Victoria. After initially taking indefinite leave in November 2019, he was removed from this position following a Whittlesea City Council meeting on 10 December 2019, a week before his scheduled appearance at the Royal Commission into the Management of Police Informants.

== Honours and other achievements ==

| Australian Police Medal | 26 January 2007 | Australia Day Honours – for service as Deputy Commissioner with Victoria Police |
| National Medal | 1999 | For 15 years' service |

He is a Fellow of the Institute of Public Administration Australia and a Graduate of the Australian Institute of Company Directors.

== See also ==
- Ken Jones
- Christine Nixon
- Ken Lay

Police appointments
| Preceded by Christine Nixon | Chief Commissioner of Victoria Police; 2009–2011 | Succeeded by Ken Lay |
