= James Angus (scientist) =

Australian pharmacologist

James Angus AO FAA

Governor of Victoria
- Acting; 1 July 2023 – 9 August 2023
- Monarch: Charles III
- Premier: Daniel Andrews
- Preceded by: Linda Dessau
- Succeeded by: Margaret Gardner

15th Lieutenant-Governor of Victoria
- Incumbent
- Assumed office 12 November 2021
- Governor: Linda Dessau; Margaret Gardner
- Preceded by: Ken Lay

Personal details
- Born: James Alexander Angus; 15 February 1949 (age 77) Sydney, New South Wales, Australia
- Education: University of Sydney
- Profession: Pharmacologist

James Alexander Angus AO FAA (born 15 February 1949 in Sydney) is an Australian pharmacologist, who has served as the Lieutenant-Governor of Victoria since 12 November 2021.

He held the Chair in Pharmacology at the University of Melbourne from 1993 to 2003, and was the Dean of the Faculty of Medicine, Dentistry and Health Sciences at the University of Melbourne from 2003 to 2013.

He was elected a Fellow of the Australian Academy of Science (FAA) in 1996, awarded the Centenary Medal in 2001, and appointed an Officer of the Order of Australia in 2010. Angus was made an Honorary Fellow of the Australian Academy of Health and Medical Sciences in 2015.

After Linda Dessau finished her term in June 2023, he stood in as acting Governor until Margaret Gardner assumed office on 9 August 2023.

Government offices
Preceded by Ken Lay	Lieutenant-Governor of Victoria; 2021–present	Incumbent
