= Linda Dessau =

Governor of Victoria from 2015 to 2023

The Honourable Linda Dessau AC CVO
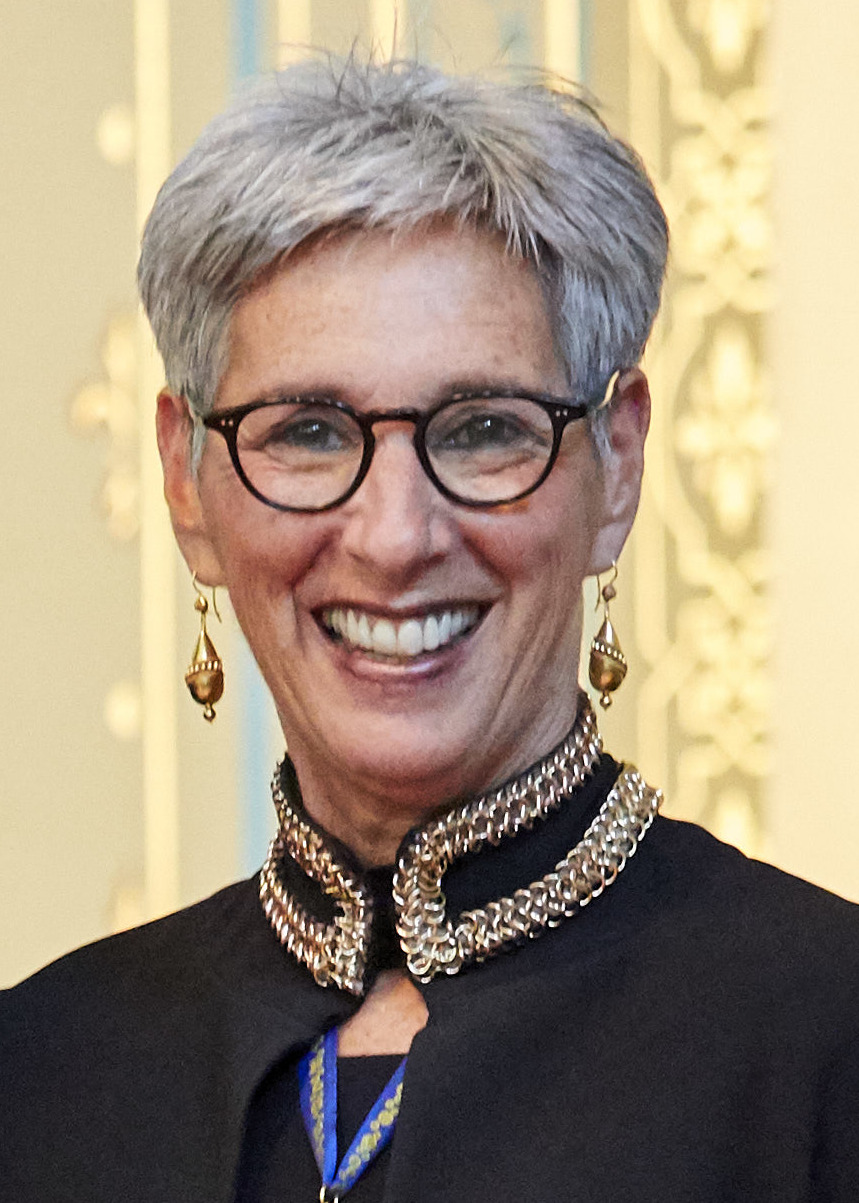
- Dessau in 2019

29th Governor of Victoria
- In office 1 July 2015 – 30 June 2023
- Monarchs: Elizabeth II; Charles III
- Premier: Daniel Andrews
- Lieutenant: Marilyn Warren (2015–2017); Ken Lay (2017–2021); James Angus (2021–2023)
- Preceded by: Alex Chernov
- Succeeded by: Margaret Gardner

Personal details
- Born: Linda Marion Dessau; 8 May 1953 (age 73) East Melbourne, Victoria, Australia
- Spouse: Tony Howard (m. 1982)
- Children: 2 sons
- Education: St Catherine’s School; University of Melbourne
- Profession: Jurist, barrister

Linda Marion Dessau AC CVO (born 8 May 1953) is an Australian jurist and barrister who served as the 29th governor of Victoria from 2015 to 2023. She was the first female and the first Jewish holder of the office. She was previously a judge of the Family Court of Australia from 1995 to 2013.

== Early life ==
Dessau was born in Melbourne, Victoria, on 8 May 1953, the youngest of four children. Her father, John Dessau, arrived in Melbourne from Poland in 1929. At first he took on factory work, but later he became a businessman. He married Sybil, who was born in Melbourne.

Dessau spent time in Israel as a young woman, including several months as a kibbutznik at Sdot Yam.

Dessau was educated at St Catherine's School, Toorak, matriculating at the age of sixteen. She graduated with a Bachelor of Laws with Honours from the University of Melbourne in 1973 as its youngest law graduate.

== Legal career ==
Dessau was admitted to practise as a solicitor and barrister in 1975. She worked as associate partner with Melbourne-based family law firm Wisewoulds, later practising as a barrister in family law matters for four years. In 1982 she moved to Hong Kong and took up an appointment as crown counsel in the Legal Department. She was subsequently appointed senior crown counsel and prosecuted criminal jury trials and appeals. Dessau returned to Australia in 1985 and the following year was appointed as a magistrate with the Magistrates' Court of Victoria. She was supervising magistrate of the court's civil and family division until her appointment to the Family Court of Australia in 1995.

== Community service ==
Dessau was appointed to the AFL Commission in November 2007, the second woman ever appointed to the Commission, and attracted speculation that she might become the first female chair of the Commission. She is a supporter of the Essendon Football Club, and in 1997 she started, and was the inaugural chair of, the Essendon Women's Network, which for more than a decade has maintained a strong presence in the grand final week calendar. She was appointed to the board of the Melbourne Festival, of which she became president in 2014. Dessau was a member of the Council of Trustees of the National Gallery of Victoria from August 2013, resigning on 27 March 2015 following the announcement of her appointment as governor.

Awarding Dessau an honorary doctorate in 2022, Melbourne's La Trobe University described her as "an inspiring pioneer and role model for women in leadership through her judicial appointments and in her numerous community roles in service of others."

== Governor ==
With an eight-year term, Dessau is the longest-serving governor of Victoria since 1974, when Major General Sir Rohan Delacombe, KCMG KCVO KBE CB DSO concluded an eleven-year term. Announcing a three-year extension to her five-year term in 2019, the premier of Victoria, Daniel Andrews, said of Dessau and her husband, “Through their tireless work they have wonderfully represented and celebrated our diverse community and its achievements at home and internationally, while making Government House a more open, accessible and inclusive place.”

On 1 November 2021, Dessau succeeded Queensland governor Paul de Jersey as the longest-serving incumbent state governor. Although she had received a commission to act as Administrator of the Commonwealth in the absence of the governor-general of Australia following her appointment in 2016, it was only after becoming the longest-serving state governor in 2021 that she was routinely called on to fulfill that role.

La Trobe University's 2022 honorary doctorate citation said, "As Governor, she has carried out her constitutional responsibilities and ceremonial duties with distinction and worked tirelessly in the community and international engagement activities."

Dessau is one of five Jews to have served in a viceregal capacity in Australia, after governors-general Sir Isaac Isaacs and Sir Zelman Cowen, and governors Sir Matthew Nathan (Queensland) and Gordon Samuels (New South Wales).

In August 2016, Dessau was embroiled in an expenses scandal, which saw her personally repay the expenses of lunches at a Gordon Ramsay restaurant (Pétrus) and Harrods, which had originally been paid by the Victorian taxpayer. In 2016, the level of expenses for capital works and ongoing maintenance requested by Dessau were alleged to be excessive, and a former Government House employee told the Herald Sun that the working environment there was "toxic".

On the expiration of her term on 30 June 2023, she was succeeded by Margaret Gardner, the then-vice chancellor of Monash University. At the same time as announcing Professor Gardner as the 30th governor of Victoria, the premier thanked Dessau "for her outstanding leadership and compassion during some of our state’s most challenging times. The Governor and her husband Anthony Howard AM KC have supported, represented and championed our diverse community with grace and dedication.”

Dessau was appointed a Commander of the Royal Victorian Order (named for Queen Victoria, not the state) by Charles III in the 2023 New Year Honours. The order is within the personal gift of the sovereign, and recognises distinguished personal service to the monarch.

== Personal life ==
Dessau is married to Anthony Howard, AM, KC, a former judge of the County Court of Victoria. They were married in 1982 and have two sons. In 2021 their son Ollie became engaged to Lauren Thurin, the granddaughter of billionaire property developer John Gandel.

== Honours ==
Viceregal styles of Linda Dessau (2015–2023)
- Reference style: Her Excellency the Honourable
- Spoken style: Your Excellency

Orders

- 14 June 2010: Member of the Order of Australia (AM) "For service to the judiciary, particularly through contributions in the area of family law policy and practice, and to the community."
- 26 January 2017: Companion of the Order of Australia (AC) "For eminent service to the people of Victoria through leadership roles in the judiciary, to the advancement of economic ties and business relationships, and as a supporter of charitable, sporting and arts organisations."
- (United Kingdom) 11 February 2016: Dame of the Order of St John.
- 1 January 2023: Commander of the Royal Victorian Order (CVO)

Organisations

- (Australia) 1994: Churchill Fellowship. She travelled to the United States, Canada and the United Kingdom to study strategies employed to reduce delay within the court system.
- (Victoria (state)) 2018: Victorian Honour Roll of Women by the Victorian State government.

Appointments

- (Australia) 2015–2023: Representative Colonel of the Royal Victoria Regiment.
- (United Kingdom) 2015–2023: Deputy Prior of the Order of St John.

Awards

- (Australia) 2022: Doctor of Laws (honoris causa), La Trobe University

Government offices
Preceded by Alex Chernov	Governor of Victoria; 2015–2023	Succeeded by Margaret Gardner
