= Graham Ashton =

Australian police officer

Graham Ashton AM APM

22nd Chief Commissioner of Victoria Police
- In office 1 July 2015 – 26 June 2020
- Preceded by: Ken Lay
- Succeeded by: Shane Patton

Personal details
- Born: Graham Leonard Ashton; 1962 (age 63–64) Aldgate, South Australia
- Occupation: Police officer

Graham Leonard Ashton AM APM (born 1962) is an Australian police officer who was the Chief Commissioner of Victoria Police from 2015 to 2020. He also served in the Australian Federal Police for a long period.

Ashton was born in Aldgate, South Australia and lived there for a short time until his family moved to the Adelaide suburb of Dernancourt. When he turned 18, he left Adelaide and moved to Canberra to join the Australian Federal Police (AFP), and was later posted to the AFP's Melbourne and Brisbane offices. From 1995 to 1997, he served as the law enforcement liaison officer in Indonesia at the Australian embassy in Jakarta.

In 2002, he returned to Indonesia as operational commander of the Australian police component of Operation Alliance, the joint investigation and victim identification process following the 2002 Bali bombings. In 2003, whilst serving as national manager of counter-terrorism, he was awarded the Australian Police Medal and was made a Member of the Order of Australia (AM) for his work on Alliance.

In 2004, Ashton left the AFP after 24 years of service and accepted a position at the newly formed Office of Police Integrity in Victoria. In 2009, he was made director of forensic services for Victoria Police, thereafter as Assistant Commissioner (Crime) and in 2012, Deputy Commissioner of Specialist Operations. In January 2015, he returned to the AFP as a deputy commissioner, but several months later was appointed as the chief commissioner of Victoria Police, replacing Ken Lay who had retired.

After the AB v CD decision in the High Court of Australia case Ashton said that "Ethics is a murky, murky thing".

During his time as Chief Commissioner of Victoria Police, Ashton had to deal with the following issues:

- January 2017 Melbourne car attack
- December 2017 Melbourne car attack whilst Shane Patton was acting Chief Commissioner
- Investigation of George Pell
- The Royal Commission into Family Violence
- The revelations about Nicola Gobbo and the associated Royal Commission
- The COVID-19 pandemic in Victoria

In May 2020, Victoria Police confirmed that Ashton would retire at the conclusion of his five-year term at the end of June 2020, in keeping with his stated plans when he was appointed to the role. It was announced that his replacement would be appointed from within the force's senior command with Shane Patton taking over the role when Ashton left.

Police appointments
Preceded by Ken Lay	Chief Commissioner of Victoria Police; 2015–2020	Succeeded by Shane Patton
