= Alex Chernov =

Australian jurist

The Honourable Alex Chernov AC KC
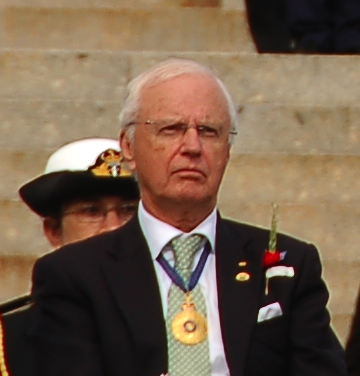
- Chernov at an Anzac Day ceremony in 2013

28th Governor of Victoria
- In office 8 April 2011 – 30 June 2015
- Monarch: Elizabeth II
- Premier: Ted Baillieu; Denis Napthine; Daniel Andrews
- Lieutenant: Marilyn Warren
- Preceded by: David de Kretser
- Succeeded by: Linda Dessau

Personal details
- Born: 12 May 1938 (age 88) Vilnius, Lithuania
- Spouse: Elizabeth Hopkins
- Education: University of Melbourne
- Profession: Barrister, judge

Alex Chernov AC KC (born 12 May 1938) is an Australian lawyer, judge and barrister who served as the 28th Governor of Victoria, from 2011 to 2015. Chernov also served as Vice-President of the Australian Bar Association, from 1986 to 1987, President of the Law Council of Australia, from 1990 to 1991, and the 20th Chancellor of Melbourne University, from 2009 to 2011.

== Early life ==
Chernov was born in Wilno, Poland (now Vilnius, Lithuania) in 1938 to Russian parents, and migrated with his family to Salzburg, Austria, after the Soviet invasion, where he commenced his schooling. In 1949 his family migrated to Australia and he completed his education at Melbourne High School. He graduated as a Bachelor of Commerce and a Bachelor of Laws (with Honours) from the University of Melbourne in 1961 and 1968 respectively as a resident of Ormond College.

== Career ==
Chernov was admitted to practise and signed the Roll of Counsel as a barrister in 1968, practising mostly in commercial law and equity. He was appointed Queen's Counsel in 1980 and later in a majority of other states. He was Chairman of the Victorian Bar (1985–86), Vice-President of the Australian Bar Association (1986–87) and President of the Law Council of Australia (1990–91). He was Vice President of LawAsia (1995–97). Chernov was the co-author with Robert Brooking of Tenancy Law and Practice: Victoria (1972) and the editor of its second edition (1980).

In May 1997, Chernov was appointed to the Trial Division of the Supreme Court of Victoria, and in October 1998 to the Court of Appeal of that Court. He retired from the bench in February 2008.

Chernov was elected the 20th Chancellor of the University of Melbourne in January 2009, serving in that office until he resigned to take up the office of Governor of Victoria.

== Vice-regal office ==
On 21 February 2011, it was announced that Chernov would become the 28th Governor of Victoria. He assumed that office on 8 April 2011. On the retirement of Dame Marie Bashir as Governor of New South Wales on 1 October 2014, Chernov became the longest-serving governor of an Australian state and by custom assumed the additional office of Administrator of the Commonwealth, which exercises the powers of the Governor-General of Australia in the governor-general's absence or disability. Chernov's term of office ended in June 2015; former judge Linda Dessau was appointed as his replacement.

== Personal life ==
Chernov is married and has three children.

== Honours ==
Chernov was appointed Queen's Counsel in and for the State of Victoria in 1980. He was created an Officer of the Order of Australia in the 2007 Queen's Birthday Honours list for service to the law and education.

On 26 January 2012, Chernov was named a Companion of the Order of Australia.

On 14 May 2014, Chernov was awarded an honorary doctorate of laws by Monash University.

Academic offices
Preceded by Ian Renard	Chancellor of the University of Melbourne; 2009–2011	Succeeded by Elizabeth Alexander
Government offices
Preceded by David de Kretser	Governor of Victoria; 2011–2015	Succeeded by Linda Dessau
