= John Landy =

Australian athlete and Governor of Victoria (1930–2022)

The Honourable John Landy AC CVO MBE FTSE
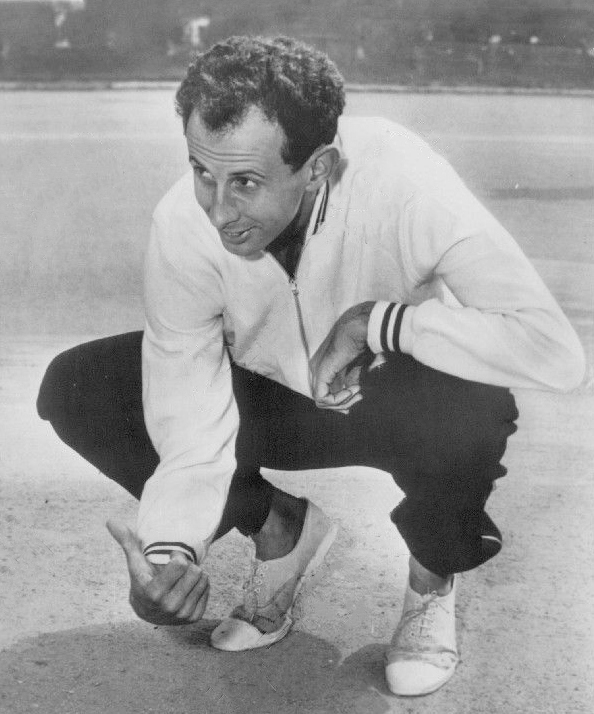
- Landy in 1956

26th Governor of Victoria
- In office 1 January 2001 – 7 April 2006
- Monarch: Elizabeth II
- Premier: Steve Bracks
- Lieutenant: Lady Marigold Southey
- Preceded by: Sir James Gobbo
- Succeeded by: David de Kretser

Personal details
- Born: John Michael Landy; 12 April 1930 Melbourne, Victoria, Australia
- Died: 24 February 2022 (aged 91) Castlemaine, Victoria, Australia
- Spouse: Lynne Fisher
- Education: University of Melbourne
- Occupation: Athlete, governor
- Sports career
- Height: 182 cm (6 ft 0 in)
- Weight: 69 kg (152 lb)
- Sport: Athletics
- Event: 1500 m – 3 miles
- Club: Geelong Guild Athletics Club, Belmont, Victoria

Sports achievements and titles
- Personal bests: 1500 m – 3:41.8 (1954); 3 miles – 13:27.4 (1956); Mile – 3:57.9 (3:58 rounded up) (1954)
Medal record
Men's athletics
Representing Australia
Olympic Games
Bronze medal – third place	1956 Melbourne	1500 m
British Empire and Commonwealth Games
Silver medal – second place	1954 Vancouver	Mile

John Michael Landy AC CVO MBE FTSE (12 April 1930 – 24 February 2022) was an Australian middle-distance runner and state governor. He was the second man to break the four-minute mile barrier in the mile run and held the world records for the 1500-metre run and the mile race. He was also the 26th Governor of Victoria from 2001 to 2006.

== Family ==
The son of Clarence Gordon Landy (1900-1970), and Elva Katherine Landy (1906-1995), née Ashton, John Michael Landy was born in Melbourne, Victoria, on 12 April 1930. He married English journalist Lynne Fisher at Upper Beaconsfield on 30 October 1971. They had two children.

== Education ==
He attended Malvern Memorial Grammar School and Geelong Grammar School. He was initially more interested in nature, and Australian rules football, though in his final year (1948) won the "Associated Public Schools Mile Championship" in a fierce race that resulted in his victory over P.B. Quin, of Xavier College, who was subsequently disqualified for his interference.

He graduated from the University of Melbourne with a Bachelor of Agricultural Science in March 1954.

== Athletics ==
During his school years, Landy enjoyed watching middle-distance track events. He became a serious runner during his university years, joining the Geelong Guild Athletic Club in 1949. He was coached by Percy Cerutty, who trained him to cut his time for running a mile down to 4 minutes, 11 seconds, earning himself a place on the Australian Olympic team at the 1952 Summer Olympics in Helsinki. While at the Helsinki Olympics, Landy befriended Emil Zatopek, the Czech four-time gold medal-winning runner, who persuaded him to increase the intensity of his training programme. He became faster still.

In March 1954 he was awarded the Helms World Trophy for Australasia for his "athletic prowess". On 21 June 1954, at an international meet at Turku, Finland, Landy became the second man, after Roger Bannister, to achieve a sub-4-minute mile. He achieved a world record time of 3:57.9, ratified by the IAAF as 3:58.0 owing to the rounding rules then in effect. He held this record for more than three years.

=== Roger Bannister ===
Landy ran his second sub-4-minute mile on 7 August at the 1954 British Empire and Commonwealth Games, held in Vancouver, British Columbia. He lost the Mile Race to Roger Bannister, who had his best-ever time. This was the first time in history that two men had run a mile in under four minutes in the same race. This meeting of the world's two fastest milers was alternately called "The Miracle Mile", the "Race of the Century", and the "Dream Race"; it was heard over the radio by 100 million people and seen on television by millions more. On the final turn of the last lap, as Landy looked over his left shoulder, Bannister passed him on the right. A larger-than-life bronze sculpture of the two men at this moment was created by Vancouver sculptor Jack Harman in 1967 from a photograph by Vancouver Sun photographer Charlie Warner and stood for many years at the entrance to Empire Stadium; after the stadium was demolished, the sculpture was moved to the Hastings and Renfrew entrance of the Pacific National Exhibition (PNE) fairgrounds. In 2015, it returned to the site of the stadium. Regarding this sculpture, Landy quipped that "While Lot's wife was turned into a pillar of salt for looking back, I am probably the only one ever turned into bronze for looking back."

=== Ron Clarke ===
At the 1956 Australian National Championships prior to the Melbourne Olympic Games, in the final of the mile race, Landy stopped and doubled back to check on fellow runner Ron Clarke after another runner clipped Clarke's heel, causing him to fall early in the third lap of the race. Landy, who was close behind, leaped to clear his body but scraped his spikes on Clarke's shoulder. Clarke, the then-junior mile world record holder, had been leading the race. Landy apologised, helped him back to his feet and they both started running again. In the final two laps Landy made up the deficit and won the race. The National Centre for History and Education in Australia said that "[i]t was a spontaneous gesture of sportsmanship and it has never been forgotten." Sculptor Mitch Mitchell created a bronze sculpture of the moment when Landy helps Clarke to his feet. The sculpture was dedicated in June 2002 and is on Olympic Boulevard, Olympic Park in Melbourne.

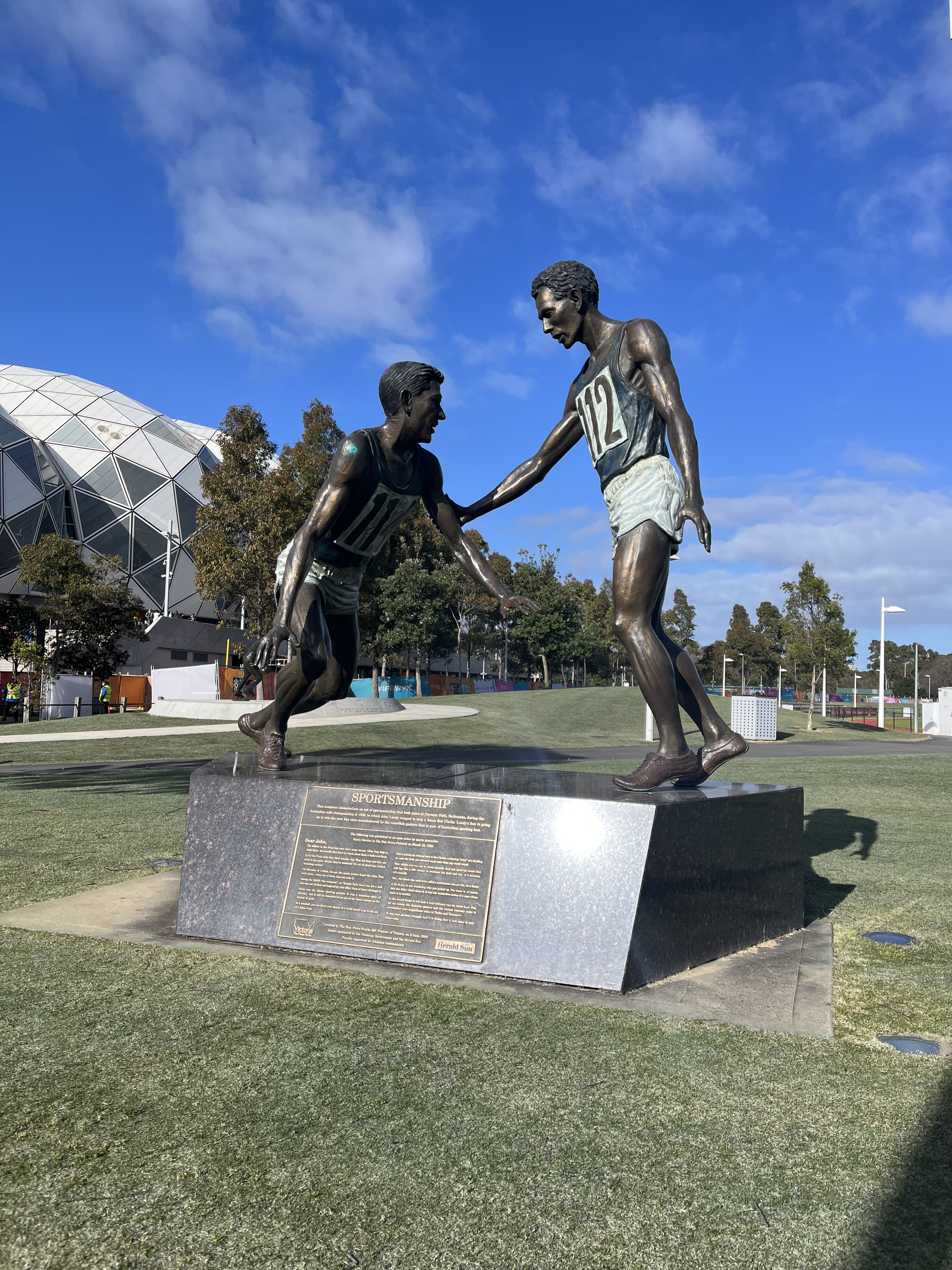
Sportsmanship sculpture of John Landy, Melbourne Australia

== Governor of Victoria ==
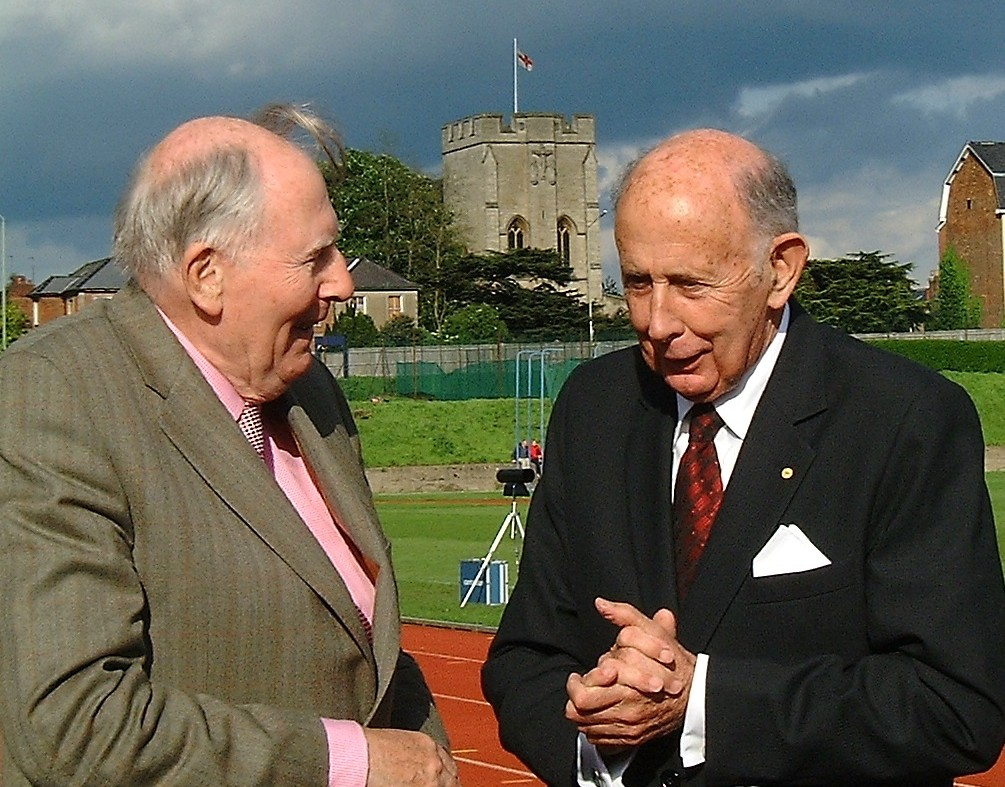
Landy (right) with Roger Bannister in 2004

On 1 January 2001, Landy was sworn in as the 26th Governor of Victoria, succeeding Sir James Gobbo. He was appointed by Queen Elizabeth II on the recommendation of Premier of Victoria Steve Bracks, who remained premier throughout his term. Landy retired as governor on 7 April 2006, and was succeeded by David de Kretser. On 15 March 2006, in the final month of his term as governor, Landy was the final runner in the Queen's Baton relay during the 2006 Commonwealth Games opening ceremony at the Melbourne Cricket Ground stadium in Melbourne, presenting the baton to the Queen.

== Other accomplishments ==
Landy worked as senior manager at ICI Australia, and had a public speaking career. For eight years (1971–78), he served on the Victorian Land Conservation Council, contributing to debates and recommendations about the balanced use of public land across Victoria. Landy authored two books on natural history: Close to Nature (1984) and A Coastal Diary (Pan Macmillan Australia, 1993).

Landy was commissioner-general for the Australian pavilion at Expo 86 Vancouver. On 12 February 2009, he was appointed the chair of the Victorian Bushfire Appeal Fund Advisory Panel. He stood down from the position on 7 September that same year.

== Death ==
Landy died on 24 February 2022 at his home in Castlemaine, Victoria, aged 91. He had Parkinson's disease for a period of time.

His life was commemorated in a State Memorial Service at the Melbourne Cricket Ground on 20 December 2022.

== Honours and awards ==
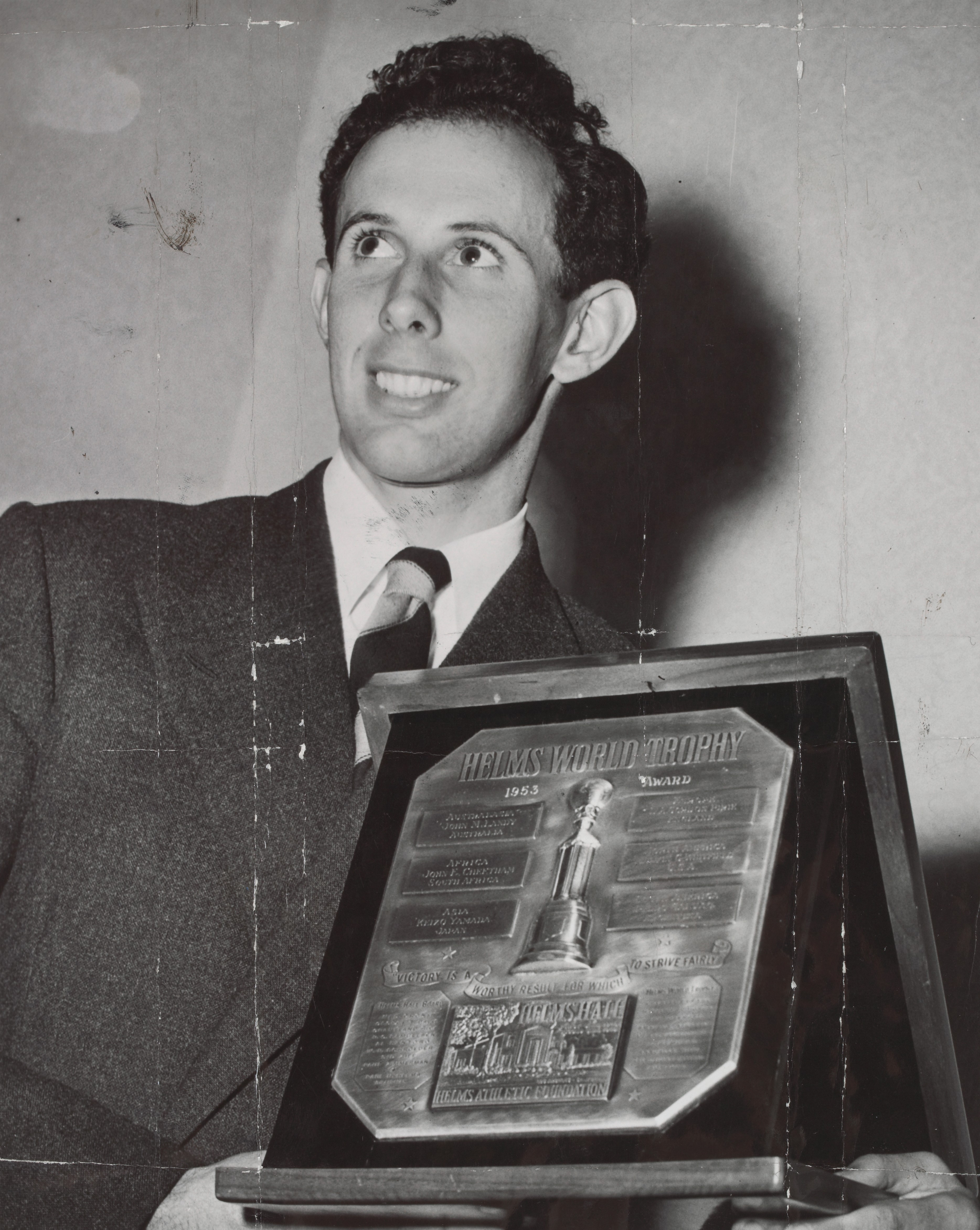
Landy in 1954

In 1949 and 1950, Landy played Australian rules football for Dookie College when he was at the University of Melbourne's Dookie College campus and won the 1950 Central Goulburn Valley Football League's best and fairest award.

In 1955, Landy was made a Member of the Order of the British Empire (MBE) for services to amateur athletics in Australia, was awarded the Australian Sports Medal in 2000, and in 2001 was awarded the Centenary Medal, made a Companion of the Order of Australia (AC), and a Knight of Grace of the Most Venerable Order of the Hospital of St John of Jerusalem. In 2006 he was appointed a Commander of the Royal Victorian Order (CVO) during the Queen's visit to Australia. Landy was inducted into the Sport Australia Hall of Fame in 1985.

Over the years, Landy was awarded honorary degrees, the first being a Doctor of Laws from the University of Victoria in 1994 then, in 1997, a Doctor of Rural Science from the University of New England, followed by a Doctor of Laws from the University of Melbourne in 2003, and Doctor of Laws from Deakin University in 2009.

On 12 July 2008, Landy was the guest speaker at his club's centenary dinner held in North Geelong. He had been a life member of the Geelong Guild Athletic Club since April 1958. Named after Landy, Landy Field in South Geelong is the Geelong region's major athletic facility. East Doncaster Secondary College has a VCE centre dedicated in Landy's honour. Central Park, in Malvern East, Melbourne, has a sports oval dedicated to Landy with a plaque which reads in part "Named in honour of John Landy, resident of Central Park Road, who used this oval for his training."

== In media ==
In the 1988 television miniseries The Four Minute Mile, detailing the rivalry between Landy and Sir Roger Bannister, Landy was portrayed by actor Nique Needles and Bannister was portrayed by actor Richard Huw.

== See also ==
- List of Caulfield Grammar School people

Records
Preceded by (United States) Wes Santee	Men's 1500 metres World Record Holder; 21 June 1954 – 28 July 1955	Succeeded by (Hungary) Sándor Iharos (Hungary) László Tábori (Denmark) Gunnar Nielsen
Preceded by (United Kingdom) Roger Bannister	Men's Mile World Record Holder; 21 June 1954 – 19 July 1957	Succeeded by (United Kingdom) Derek Ibbotson
Government offices
Preceded by Sir James Gobbo	Governor of Victoria; 2001–2006	Succeeded by David de Kretser
