= Mike Bush =

Chief Commissioner of Victoria Police

Mike Bush CNZM
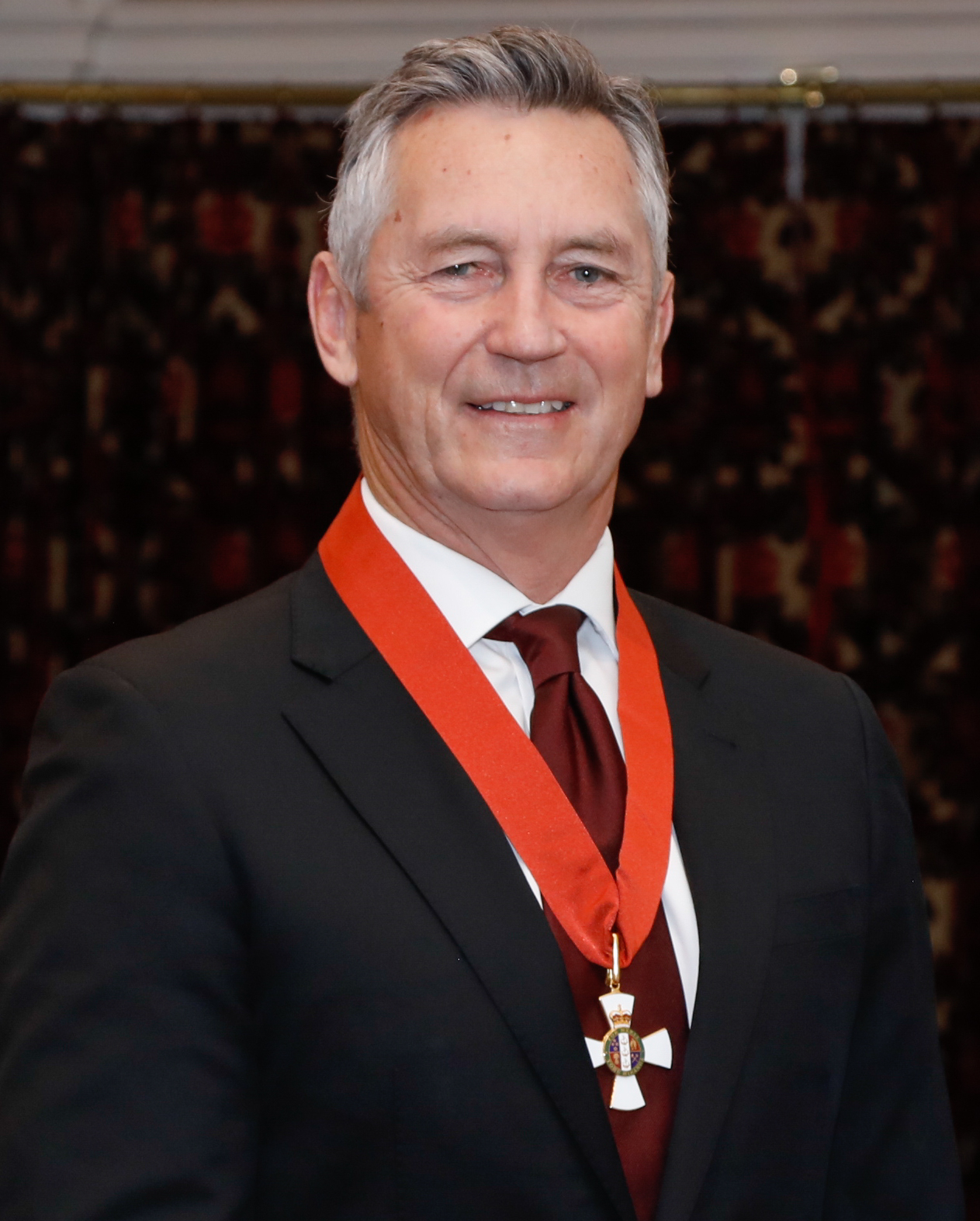
- Bush in 2020

24th Chief Commissioner of Victoria Police
- Incumbent
- Assumed office 27 June 2025
- Preceded by: Shane Patton

32nd Commissioner of New Zealand Police
- In office 3 April 2014 – 2 April 2020
- Preceded by: Peter Marshall
- Succeeded by: Andrew Coster

Personal details
- Born: 1959 or 1960 (age 65–66)

Michael Dennis Bush CNZM is the current Chief Commissioner of Victoria Police in Australia and a former New Zealand police officer. He served as the Commissioner of the New Zealand Police from April 2014 until April 2020. In May 2025, he was appointed as the next Chief Commissioner of Victoria Police in Australia and took office in late June 2025.

== Career ==
=== New Zealand ===
Bush joined the New Zealand Police in 1978, working at both Criminal Investigation Branch and frontline policing. As he progressed through the ranks he was appointed to senior roles, including liaison officer for Southeast Asia. This position was held by Bush at the time of the 2004 Boxing Day tsunami. He was the first New Zealand official on the scene of this incident, arriving on Phuket to assist with relief. In the 2006 New Year Honours, he was appointed a Member of the New Zealand Order of Merit (MNZM) for his relief work. He was also awarded the New Zealand Special Service Medal (Asian Tsunami) recognising this work.

Upon appointment to the role of Commissioner of Police in 2014, Bush made several changes focused on operational models and culture. These included the introduction of a "Prevention First" operating model, where the primary focus of policing resources would be on crime prevention. Bush introduced additional core values of "Empathy" and "Valuing Diversity" in an effort to make cultural changes following the 2007 Commission of Inquiry into Police. Bush was reappointed to the role of commissioner in 2017 for a second term that ran until April 2020.

In the 2020 Queen's Birthday Honours, Bush was promoted to Companion of the New Zealand Order of Merit, for services to the New Zealand Police and the community.

The COVID-19 pandemic reached New Zealand at the end of Bush's tenure as commissioner. Bush was appointed to lead the operational arm of the COVID-19 All-of-Government Response Group on 23 March 2020 and continued to hold this role after retiring from the New Zealand Police in April 2020.

After leaving the police, Bush worked as a private investigator and ran his own international consulting firm specialising in leadership, organisational design, risk management, and security. In 2023, Bush led the independent review into Auckland Council's emergency management system and preparedness following the 2023 Auckland Anniversary Weekend floods.

=== Australia ===
On 6 May 2025, the Victoria State Government announced Bush had been appointed as the Chief Commissioner of Victoria Police, succeeding Acting Chief Commissioner Rick Nugent. His appointment commenced on 27 June 2025.

Bush attracted criticism for non-operational use of the Victoria Police Air Wing helicopter, when travelling to Hobart for a conference prior to October 2025, as well as his wife's presence on a police helicopter on another day.

== Controversies ==
In August 2014 Bush apologised on behalf of the police to the people of Ruatoki and Tūhoe following the actions of police in 2007 during the termination of the Operation Eight investigation into alleged terror activities. Tamati Kruger, acting as spokesman for Tūhoe, stated that the apology was well received by those present, however some iwi had declined to take part.

In 2017 it was revealed Bush had been convicted in 1983 of a drink driving offence while off-duty, when a detective constable. From 1991 onward, new rules were introduced where this conviction would have made Bush ineligible to join the police. Bush had followed the correct process that included disclosing this conviction to the State Services Commission prior to his appointment as a deputy commissioner. It was raised again when he applied to be London Metropolitan Police commissioner in 2022.

Bush was a member of the State Services Commission panel that recommended the appointment of Wally Haumaha to a deputy commissioner role in June 2018. Bush was warned against this appointment by senior officers including Mike Clements, given the historic comments made by Haumaha in regards to the investigation of alleged offences against Louise Nicholas. A government inquiry into the appointment process by Mary Scholtens QC was announced to review the recruitment process, which led to Haumaha's appointment. The inquiry was welcomed by Bush.

== Honours and awards ==
Bush wears a number of New Zealand awards on the uniform:

Honours and awards
New Zealand Order of Merit (CNZM)
New Zealand Special Service Medal (Asian Tsunami) (NZSSM)
New Zealand Police Long Service and Good Conduct Medal (with four devices indicating 40 or more years)
Operation Deans citation
New Zealand Police Silver Merit Award

The Long Service and Good Conduct Medal is not always appearing on the left side.

Police appointments
Preceded by Peter Marshall	Commissioner of New Zealand Police; 2014–2020	Succeeded by Andrew Coster
Preceded by Shane Patton	Chief Commissioner of Victoria Police; 2025–present	Incumbent
