= David de Kretser =

27th Governor of Victoria

The Honourable David de Kretser AC FAA FTSE FAHMS
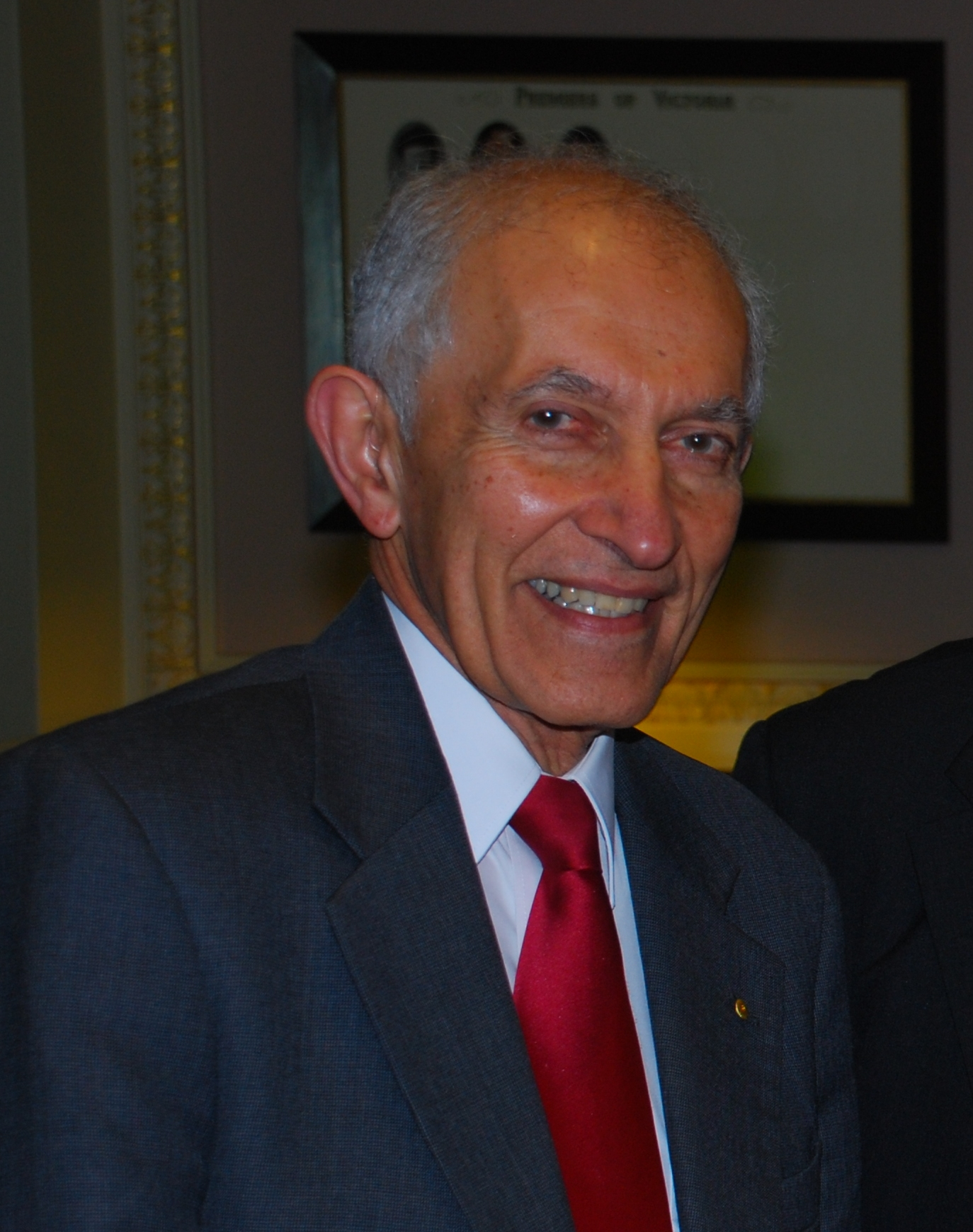
- De Kretser in 2008

27th Governor of Victoria
- In office 7 April 2006 – 7 April 2011
- Monarch: Elizabeth II
- Premier: Steve Bracks; John Brumby; Ted Baillieu
- Lieutenant: Marilyn Warren
- Preceded by: John Landy
- Succeeded by: Alex Chernov

Personal details
- Born: 27 April 1939 (age 87) Colombo, British Ceylon
- Spouse: Jan de Kretser (née Warren)
- Education: Camberwell Grammar School
- Alma mater: University of Melbourne; Monash University
- Profession: Medical researcher

David Morritz de Kretser (born 27 April 1939) is an Australian medical researcher who served as the 27th Governor of Victoria, from 2006 to 2011.

== Early life and medical career ==
David de Kretser was born in British Ceylon (now known as Sri Lanka). He was educated at St. Paul's Milagiriya and Royal College Primary, before migrating to Australia with his family when he was aged nine. He studied at Camberwell Grammar School, Melbourne (where he is currently a member of the school board), received his Bachelors of Medicine and Surgery degrees from the University of Melbourne in 1962, and his Doctor of Medicine degree from Monash University in 1969.

De Kretser is an infertility and andrology expert, and a long-serving academic. He began working at Monash University in 1965, in the university's department of anatomy, and has also worked as foundation director of the Monash Institute of Reproduction and Development (recently renamed the Monash Institute of Medical Research) and as Associate Dean of the Faculty of Medicine, Nursing and Health Sciences (the Biotechnology Department). He was a senior Fellow of endocrinology at the University of Washington in Seattle from 1969 to 1971.

De Kretser founded a medical research group, Andrology Australia. He was elected Fellow of the Australian Academy of Science (FAA) in 1996, Fellow of the Australian Academy of Technology and Engineering (FTSE) and Fellow of the Australian Academy of Health and Medical Sciences (FAHMS).

== Governor of Victoria ==
On the nomination of Premier of Victoria, Steve Bracks, De Kretser was appointed Governor of Victoria by Queen Elizabeth II, taking office on 7 April 2006, succeeding John Landy. He left the post on 8 April 2011, and was succeeded by Alex Chernov.

== Honours ==
In 2001, De Kretser was named as Victoria's Father of the Year. On 12 June 2006, in the Queen's Birthday Honours, he was awarded Australia's highest civilian honour, Companion of the Order of Australia (AC). De Kretser is also a knight of the British Venerable Order of Saint John.

== Personal life ==
De Kretser has been married to Jan Warren for over 40 years, and has four sons: Steve, Mark, Ross and Hugh. Ross and Steve are Chemical Engineers, Mark is a General Practitioner, and Hugh is a Human Rights lawyer.

Government offices
Preceded by John Landy	Governor of Victoria; 2006–2011	Succeeded by Alex Chernov
