= Official Secretary to the Governor =

Official Secretary to the Governor or Official Secretary to the Governor-General is an office in the Government House in various British overseas territories and Commonwealth realms. A similar office may be retained in some of the former British territories. In some countries or territories the titles Private Secretary, Personal Secretary or simply Secretary are used instead of Official Secretary. The Official Secretary is usually the general manager of the Government House and may have additional functions. In New Zealand and Canada, e.g., the Official Secretary is a civil service officer from the Prime Minister's Department or Office, but in Australia, the Official Secretary has become a position independent from the government.

== List of Official Secretaries to the Governor ==
- Official Secretary to the Governor-General of Australia
  - Official Secretary to the Governor of New South Wales (previous as Private Secretary to the Governor of New South Wales)
  - Official Secretary to the Governor of Victoria
- Secretary to the Governor-General of The Bahamas
- Private Secretary to the Governor of Bermuda
- Secretary to the Governor General of Canada
  - Private Secretary to the Lieutenant Governor of Nova Scotia
  - Private Secretary to the Lieutenant Governor of Ontario (previously as Private Secretary to the Lieutenant Governor of Upper Canada)
- Secretary to the Governor General of Ceylon
- Secretary to the Governor of the Falkland Islands
- Private Secretary to the Governor of Hong Kong (office renamed to Private Secretary to the Chief Executive in 1997)
- Personal Secretary to the Governor-General of Jamaica
- Official Secretary to the Governor-General of New Zealand
- Permanent Secretary to the Governor of the Turks and Caicos Islands
