= Christine Nixon =

Australian police commissioner

Christine Nixon AO, APM
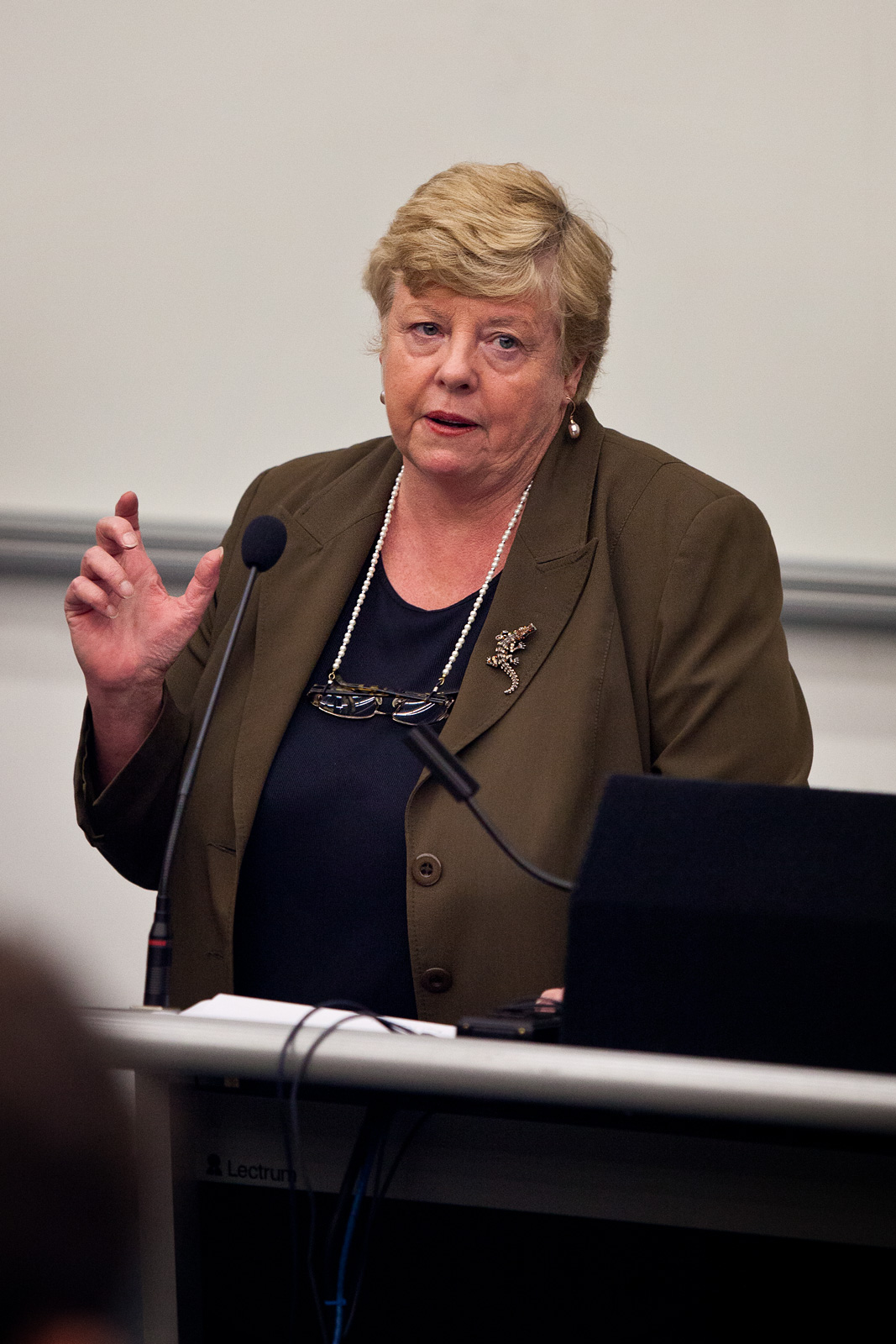

19th Chief Commissioner of Victoria Police
- In office 23 April 2001 – 27 February 2009
- Preceded by: Neil Comrie
- Succeeded by: Simon Overland

Personal details
- Born: 11 June 1953 (age 73) Manly, Sydney, New South Wales, Australia
- Spouse: John Becquet
- Education: BA, Macquarie University; MPA, Harvard Kennedy School
- Known for: First woman to become a police commissioner in Australia.

Christine Nixon AO, APM (born 11 June 1953) is an Australian former police officer who was the chief commissioner of Victoria Police from 23 April 2001 to 27 February 2009, being the first female chief commissioner in any Australian state police force. After leaving Victoria Police, she was appointed as chair of the Victorian Bushfire Reconstruction and Recovery Authority in February 2009 until she stood down from the position in July 2010.

== Education ==
Nixon attended Macquarie University before attaining a Master of Public Administration from Harvard University's John F. Kennedy School of Government.

== Police career ==
The daughter of Ross Nixon, an assistant commissioner with the New South Wales Police Force, Christine Nixon began her policing career with the same police force in 1972, also rising to the rank of Assistant Commissioner.

She was appointed Chief Commissioner of Victoria Police in April 2001 by the Bracks Labor government.

Having initially set a retirement date of late March 2009, Nixon departed earlier at the request of the Victorian Government to take on responsibility for the Victorian Bushfire Reconstruction and Recovery Authority.

She was succeeded as Chief Commissioner by Simon Overland.

=== Pride March ===
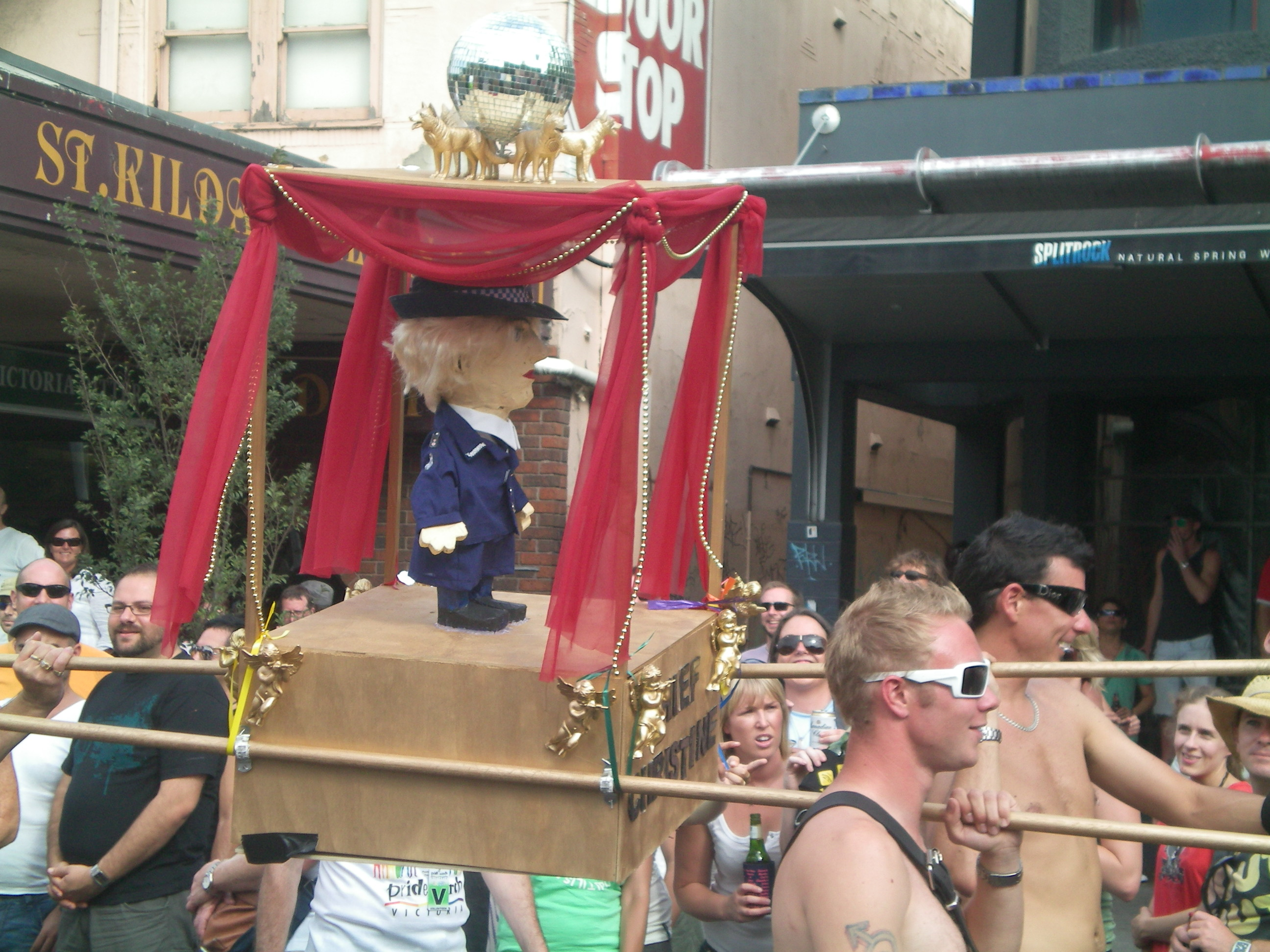
The gay community showed their respect for Nixon in marches at the 2009 Midsumma festival.

As Chief Commissioner, Nixon marched in uniform during Melbourne's gay and lesbian 'Pride March', run as part of the Midsumma Festival. Nixon is heterosexual but marched to express her support for gay and lesbian causes, stating "What I'm doing is supporting decent and reasonable people who want to get on with their lives, and they have been treated appallingly previously by the Police, and I'm prepared to do something about it. And if it's a small symbol of marching with them, then that would be a reasonable thing to do."

=== Criticism ===
Nixon was criticised when she joined her husband, John Becquet, a former Qantas senior executive of crew operations, on the October 2008 inaugural international flight of Qantas' Airbus A380 airliner from Melbourne to Los Angeles, as guests of Qantas in an all-expenses-paid, three-day trip. Ms Nixon called the trip "reasonable" and commented that she was accompanying her husband, and that she had not had a holiday in about 12 months. Mr Becquet defended the trip by saying they were invited to LA after a chance meeting with a Qantas executive. "I am normally her handbag but on this she's my handbag." The couple celebrated their 16th wedding anniversary during this week. The head of the Office of Police Integrity, Michael Strong, sought information on the matter from Ms Nixon at a time of calls for her to reimburse the airline for the cost of the trip.

=== Royal commission ===
Nixon was called to appear before the 2009 Victorian Bushfires Royal Commission concerning her actions as chief commissioner during the Black Saturday bushfires on 7 February 2009. Counsel assisting the commission, Rachel Doyle SC, questioned Nixon on issues such as a morning hairdressing appointment, a lunchtime meeting with her biographer and an evening dinner at a restaurant, all during the worst day of the bushfires. Nixon defended her actions, stating, "It was not my job to swoop in and take control. When you have good people who are more skilled in emergency management than I am, you let those people do the job."

== Bushfire authority ==
In February 2009 Nixon assumed responsibility for the Victorian Bushfire Reconstruction and Recovery Authority, the agency tasked with rebuilding areas affected by the Black Saturday bushfires of February 2009. She stood down from the position on 17 July 2010, and announced she would take on a voluntary advisory role with the authority.

== Chair of RACGP ==
In October 2019 Nixon was selected as the chair of the Royal Australian College of General Practitioners (RACGP) board. This was the first time in the college's 61-year history that a non-GP was chosen for the role. She had been on the RACGP council since 2017. RACGP president Harry Nespolon praised her prior skills in leading large organisations and said of the appointment, "Ideally we would have a GP chairing the RACGP as a member-based organisation, but at the moment, Christine is the right person."

== Other positions ==
Nixon was a non-executive director of Foster's Group from 1 April 2010 to 31 August 2010. She also serves as Patron or Advisor to the Alannah and Madeline Foundation, Onside Victoria, Operation Newstart Victoria and The Phoenix Club Inc. She has been appointed as the Deputy Chancellor of Monash University.

== Awards ==
Nixon has been awarded the Australian Police Medal, the National Medal, the Centenary Medal, the New South Wales Police Medal and clasps for Ethical and Diligent Service and the New South Wales Police Force Olympic Citation. She was inducted onto the Victorian Honour Roll of Women in 2001. She was appointed an Officer of the Order of Australia for "law enforcement, to women in policing, and to tertiary education" in the 2021 Queen's Birthday Honours.

== Health ==
On 18 July 2010 Nixon was taken to hospital. She subsequently underwent gall bladder surgery.

== Memoirs ==
In 2011 Nixon published her memoirs in the book Fair Cop (ISBN 9780522856859), which she wrote with Jo Chandler. The book was launched by the Prime Minister, Julia Gillard. It was criticised by the Police Association Victoria for what the association claims is a biased recollection of events, and by the Herald Sun.

== See also ==
- Crime in Melbourne
- Women in law enforcement

Police appointments
Preceded by Neil Comrie	Chief Commissioner of Victoria Police; 2001–2009	Succeeded by Simon Overland
