= Governor of Victoria =

Representative of the monarch in Victoria

- Coat of Arms of Victoria

- Personal standard

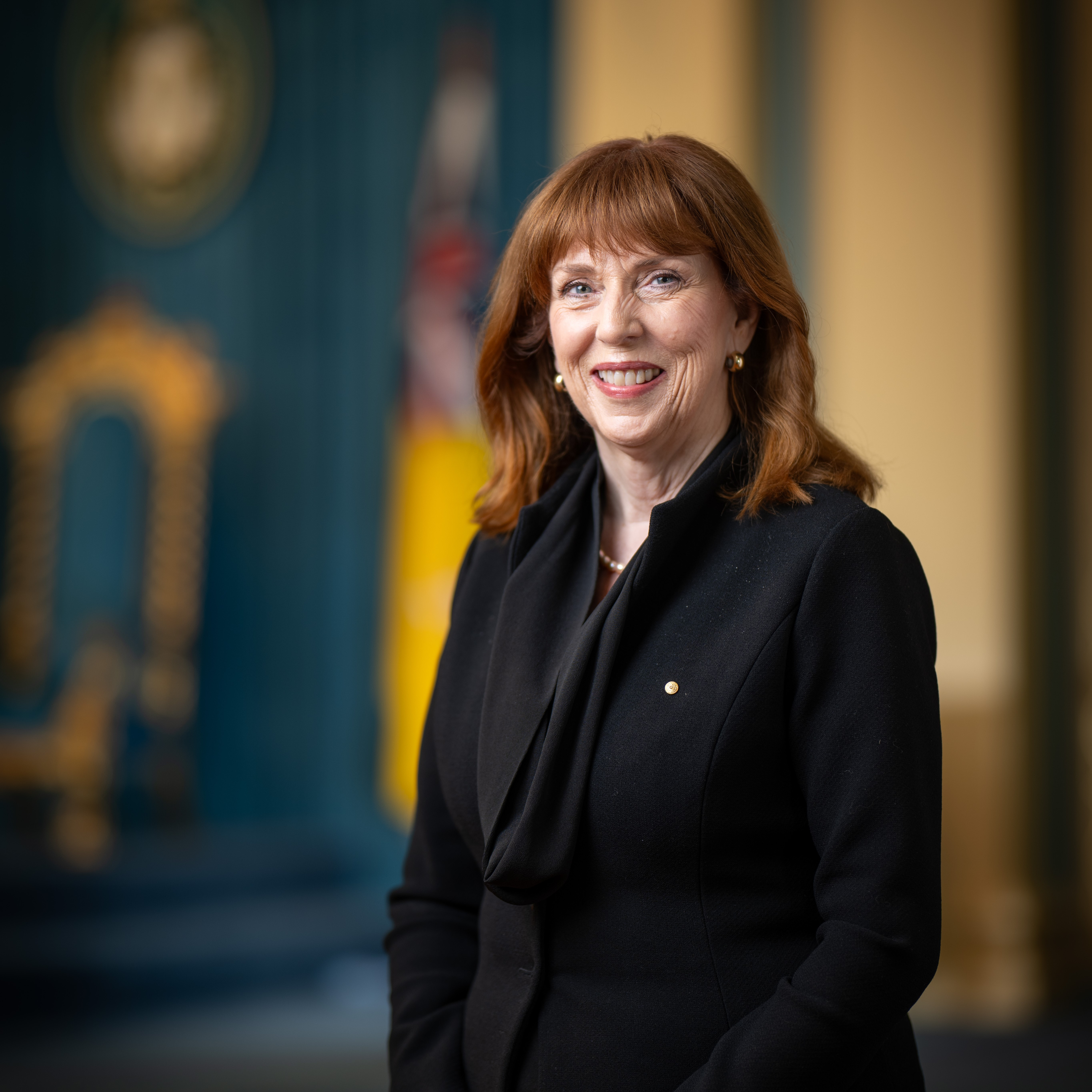
- Incumbent; Margaret Gardner since 9 August 2023
- Viceregal
- Style: Her Excellency the Honourable
- Residence: Government House, Melbourne
- Seat: Melbourne
- Appointer: Monarch; on the advice of the premier
- Term length: At His Majesty's pleasure; (typically 5 years)
- Formation: 22 May 1855; 171 years ago
- First holder: Charles Hotham
- Deputy: Lieutenant-Governor of Victoria
- Salary: $517,650 (2025)
- Website: governor.vic.gov.au

The governor of Victoria is the representative of the monarch, currently King Charles III, in the Australian state of Victoria. The governor has many constitutional and ceremonial roles in the Victorian political system; however, they are generally bound by convention to act on the advice of the premier and the Executive Council of Victoria. They also have a significant community role, through investing Australian Honours on behalf of the governor-general, patronage of community organisations, and representing the state as a whole. The current governor is Margaret Gardner.

Significant functions of the governor include giving royal assent to bills passed by the houses of parliament, issuing writs for elections, exercising executive power on the advice of the Victorian Executive Council, formally appointing government officials (including the premier, other ministers, judges and officials), opening sessions of state parliament, and presenting Australian honours. Although Australia has a federal system of government, the governor is the direct representative of the monarch and is not subordinate to the governor-general.

In almost all instances, the governor only exercises de jure power in accordance with the principles of the Westminster system and responsible government. This requires them to remain politically neutral and to only act in accordance with Parliament (such as when selecting the premier and providing royal assent) or on the advice of ministers (when performing executive actions). In certain limited circumstances, the governor can exercise reserve powers (powers that may be exercised without or against formal advice). Governors are rarely called upon to exercise these reserve powers in the modern period. However, as the Legislative Council of Victoria has always had a majority of elected members, and the Legislative Assembly of Victoria had three major parties forming ministries, the government of Victoria prior to 1960 required more active involvement by the governors than in the other Australian states. Sir Charles Darling in 1868 and Sir George Bowen in 1879 were both recalled for their poor management of constitutional crises, while premiers Albert Dunstan in 1945, Thomas Hollway in 1952 and John Cain Sr. in 1955 all lost office due to failing to maintain supply. The governors consulted Victoria's Chief Justice for advice on their exercise of the reserve powers, with Sir Dallas Brooks also consulting the Chief Justice of the High Court, Victorian Sir Owen Dixon, during the 1955 incident.

In their ceremonial and community roles, the governor represents the state as a whole. Domestically, this role entails attending services and commemorations, sponsoring community organisations and hosting events at their official residence, Government House, located next to the Royal Botanic Gardens and surrounded by Kings Domain in Melbourne. The governor also promotes Victoria's economic, social and cultural interests abroad and is entitled to travel on an Australian diplomatic passport on official business. The governor is supported an Official Secretary, and the Office of the Governor, an administrative office within the Department of Premier and Cabinet which employed 47 FTE staff in 2024.

The governor is selected by the premier and formally appointed by the monarch on the premier's advice. The term of office is not fixed, but they typically serve for five years. Between Victoria's separation from the Colony of New South Wales in 1851 and 1900, ten British-born officials served as governor, including Charles La Trobe and Charles Hotham, who were titled Lieutenant-Governor of Victoria until the colony achieved responsible government in 1855. Three of these colonial governors were minor British nobility, the other seven came from the landed gentry. Since Federation in 1901, the position was held by a series of minor British nobles, including Baron Huntingfield, the first person born in Australia to serve as governor in any state, however Victoria was the last state to begin appointing Australians as governor on a regular basis. The first Australian appointed governor was Sir Henry Winneke in 1974, and all governors since have been Australian citizens. Several governors since 1974 were born overseas, namely Davis McCaughey (born in Ireland) came to Australia for work and David de Kretser (born in Ceylon, now Sri Lanka) and Alex Chernov (born in Lithuania), both of whom came to Australia while at school. The first woman to be appointed governor was Linda Dessau, who served from 2015 to 2023.

== Appointment ==
The governor is formally appointed by the monarch with a commission made under the authority of section 6 of the Victorian Constitution. When a new governor is to be appointed, the current premier recommends a name to the monarch, who by convention accepts that recommendation. Prior to 1986, the governor was appointed by the monarch of the United Kingdom acting on the advice of the Colonial Secretary (after 1966, the Foreign Secretary), although local recommendations were considered and usually accepted by the British minister.

The incoming governor is publicly announced usually several months before the end of the existing governor's term. After receiving their commission, the new governor takes an oath or affirmation of allegiance to the monarch and an oath or affirmation of office. These oaths are administered by the chief justice of Victoria or another justice of the Supreme Court. Traditionally, the ceremony takes place in the Legislative Council chamber, although between 2001 and 2015 it was conducted at Government House.

=== Tenure ===
The Victorian Constitution does not set a term of office, so a governor may continue to hold office for any agreed length of time. The typical term of office is five years, although after this initial term, a commission may be extended. The term of Linda Dessau was extended by three years in June 2020, due to the impact of the COVID-19 pandemic in Australia. This made Deassau the longest-serving governor since Major General Sir Rohan Delacombe, who served 1963 to 1974.

There are two other offices that are authorised to administer the government of Victoria on behalf of the governor. The lieutenant-governor of Victoria is appointed by the governor by commission under the Public Seal of Victoria while the administrator of Victoria is ex officio the chief justice of the Supreme Court, unless:

- The governor has commissioned an administrator under the Public Seal of Victoria,
- There is a vacancy in the office of chief justice,
- The chief justice is the lieutenant-governor,
- The chief justice is unable or unwilling to act as administrator, or
- The chief justice is not in Victoria.

In the latter cases, the administrator is instead the next most senior justice of the supreme course who is in Victoria, willing and able to act as administrator.

The lieutenant-governor may assume the administration of the government of the state when:

- there is a vacancy in the office of Governor,
- the governor has assumed the administration of the government of the Commonwealth,
- the governor is absent from the state, or
- the governor is otherwise unable or unwilling to perform their role.

The administrator may assume the administration of the government of the state in the same situations, but not when there is a lieutenant-governor who is in Victoria, willing and able to assume the administration of the government.

The governor may also appoint the lieutenant governor or administrator as their deputy to perform some or all of the functions of the governor on behalf of the governor while the governor is exercising the office.

=== Dismissal ===
A governor may be dismissed by the monarch before their term is complete. Since the passage of the Australia Act 1986 the monarch may only dismiss a governor on advice from the premier, who is responsible for selecting an immediate replacement or letting the vacancy provisions take effect. Prior to 1986, the governors were dismissed, or recalled to the United Kingdom, by the monarch of the United Kingdom.

== Constitutional role ==
The governor has a key role in performing constitutional duties in all branches of government of the state. The governor also has a subsidiary role performing some constitutional duties relating to the government of the Commonwealth.

=== Role in the Victorian Parliament ===
The Victorian Constitution defines the Parliament of Victoria as consisting of the monarch, the Legislative Council and the Legislative Assembly. However, the monarch's role is no more than titular, with the governor responsible under the Victorian Constitution and Australia Act 1986 for all of the functions undertaken by the monarch in regard to the UK parliament. These include the power to summon, dissolve and prorogue the Parliament, to issue writs for elections, as well as the power to give royal assent to bills in the monarch's name.

The governor also has a ceremonial role in swearing in and accepting the resignations of members of Parliament. All members must make an oath or affirmation of allegiance to the King in the presence of the governor or someone appointed by them before they take their seats. On the day parliament opens, the governor makes a speech in the Legislative Council (similar to the King's Speech in the UK), entirely written by the government, explaining the government's proposed legislative program.

One of the most significant powers of the governor is the power to grant royal assent in the king's name. This assent gives bills that have been passed by the houses of parliament the force of law. It is unclear whether the governor acts on the advice of the government when giving assent, with previous governors giving conflicting views. Previously the Executive Council advised the granting of assent, but since 1996 a standing instruction has been given by the premier stating assent should be given in the absence of advice otherwise. This differs from Commonwealth and other state vice-regal representatives (with the exception of South Australia) who are not given advice regarding royal assent. Assent has not been refused since the early days of responsible government. In 1857, Governor Sir Henry Barkly refused assent to the Oaths of Office Bill 1857 on the grounds that it conflicted with an act of the Imperial Parliament (the Roman Catholic Relief Act 1829). The next year, he similarly refused to assent to the Duration of Parliament Bill 1858, which aimed to alter the new constitution, but had not been passed in the manner required for constitutional alterations. In both cases, Barker assented to replacement bills that he did not consider to be beyond the power of the colonial parliament.

Prior to the Australia Act 1986, the Australian Constitutions Act 1850 (13 & 14 Vict. c. 59 (Imp)) authorised the governor to reserve a bill for the monarch's pleasure, that is allow the monarch to give royal assent personally to a proposed bill. When the governor acted as a representative of the British government, this provision allowed for the governor to refer a bill back to the British government for review, which would then advise the monarch whether or not to grant assent. Since the passage of the Australia Act 1986, the powers of the monarch in relation to the state - save for the power to appoint the governor - are exercised by the governor. Under the Australian Constitutions Act 1842 (5 & 6 Vict. c. 76 (Imp)), the British government could also advise the monarch to disallow a law passed within the last two years, which would annul the law on the governor's proclamation or message to the parliament. This power was also removed by the Australia Act 1986.

Finally, the governor can refer a bill back to the houses with suggested changes.

=== Role in executive government ===
Executive powers vested in governor by statute or as part of the prerogative are exercised on the advice of ministers in accordance with the principles of responsible government. This occurs formally through the Executive Council, a body of all current (and technically former) ministers that advises the governor. Such advice is generally the result of decisions already made in Cabinet, the de facto highest executive body in Victoria.

Formally, the governor exercises the traditional rights of the monarch as identified by Bagehot: the right to be consulted, to encourage and to warn.

=== Role in the government of the Commonwealth ===
The role of state governors in the government of the Commonwealth is limited to the issue and return of the writs for the election of senators representing their state, and the nomination of new senators to fill a casual vacancy.

When the prime minister advises governor-general to call an election of the House of Representatives within the 12 months before the expiration of the term of half the Senate, or the dissolution of both houses of parliament under section 57 of the Australian Constitution, they will also advise the governor-general to invite the state governors to issue the writs for the election of senators on the same date.

While the office of governor of Victoria has little role in the administration of the government of the Commonwealth, the individuals who serve as governors of Victoria are - like all the Governors of the Australian states - normally given a dormant commission to administer the government of the Commonwealth in the absence from Australia, or the death, incapacity or removal from office of the governor-general by the Sovereign. Victorian governors are often also appointed as a deputy of the governor-general to perform certain responsibilities of the governor-general while the governor-general is present in Australia, but unable to perform them personally.

== Ceremonial role ==
Governors' rank insignia

In addition to the formal constitutional role, the governor has a representative and ceremonial role, though the extent and nature of that role has depended on the expectations of the time, the individual in office at the time, the wishes of the incumbent government, and the individual's reputation in the wider community. Governors generally become patrons of various charitable institutions, present honours and awards, host functions for various groups of people including representatives of other countries, and travel widely throughout the state.

The governor is generally invited to become patron of various charitable and service organisations. Historically the governor has often served as Chief Scout of Victoria, Deputy Prior of the Order of St John, and by law is the Visitor of Deakin, Federation, La Trobe, Melbourne, Monash, RMIT, and Victoria Universities.

The governor makes official visits overseas on behalf of Victoria at the request of the state government. During these periods, the Lieutenant-Governor of Victoria or an administrator executes the government of the state.

The governor fills the honorary role of Representative Colonel for the Australian Army Reserve's Royal Victoria Regiment. They are an Honorary Commodore of the Royal Australian Navy, and the Honorary Air Commodore of No 21 (City of Melbourne) Squadron, Royal Australian Air Force. These appointments are strictly honorary, and unlike governors in the United States who exercise operational control their state National Guard, the governor of Victoria plays no formal role in the command structure of these units.

== Privileges ==
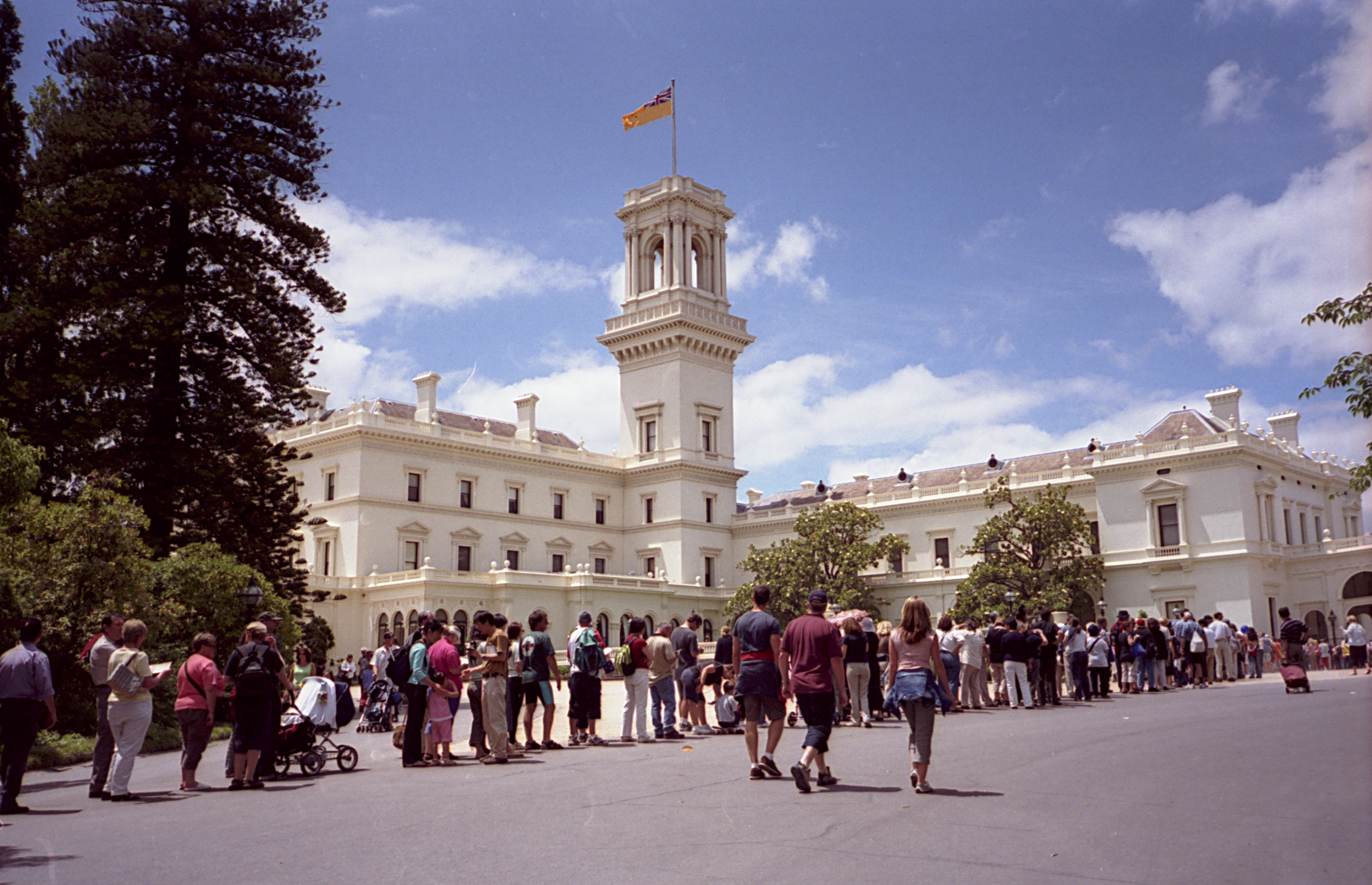
Government House, Melbourne

Governors are entitled to various privileges by virtue of holding the office. These include the right to live in Government House, the largest and grandest vice-regal residence in the Commonwealth of Nations. The state's first lieutenant-governor, (Note: the position would be retitled when the Colony of Victoria achieved responsible government in 1854) Charles La Trobe continued to live in La Trobe's Cottage, which he had built for himself as Superintendent of Port Phillip District. The colonial government then rented Toorak House from 1854 for use as Government House until the construction of the permanent building in King's Domain was completed in 1876. However, lease negotiations broke down and Sir George Bowen resided at Bishopscourt, the official residence of the Anglican Archbishop of Melbourne, during the final months before Government House was completed.

Beginning in 1901, the now-state government provided the use of Government House to the Governor-General of Australia as Melbourne was the capital city of Australia prior to the construction of Canberra. The governor-general remained resident in Melbourne outside of parliamentary sitting periods after the capital moved in 1927, not moving to Yarralumla full-time until Sir Issac Issacs took up the post. During this period, the state government rented Stonnington Mansion for use by the state governor, eventually purchasing the building and its contents in 1928. After the governors returned to live at Government House, Stonnington was used as a school.

The governor's official vehicles use a representation of St Edward's Crown in place of a standard registration plate and fly the governor's personal standard.

=== Salary ===
The salary of the governor was initially set by the Australian Constitutions Act 1850 at £2,000, (Note: That is, pounds sterling; the Australian pound (with the same value) was introduced in 1910.) which also required any bill that altered the governor's salary to be reserved for her majesty's pleasure. As of 2025, the governor is paid the same salary as a justice of the supreme court (currently $517,650)

=== Official dress ===
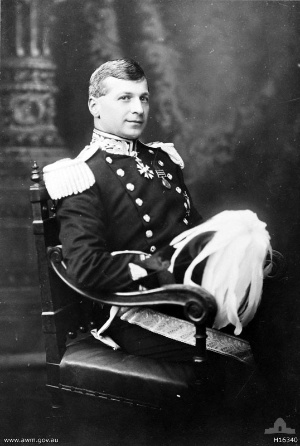
Sir Arthur Stanley, 14th governor of Victoria (1914-20), in his court uniform

Governors before the 1970s wore traditional court uniforms, based on the uniform of the Lord Lieutenants of English counties with the colours reversed. It consisted of a dark navy wool double-breasted coatee with silver oak leaf and fern embroidery on the collar and cuffs trimmed with silver buttons embossed with the Royal Arms and with bullion edged epaulettes on the shoulders, dark navy trousers with a wide band of silver oak-leaf braid down the outside seam, silver sword belt with ceremonial sword, bicorne cocked hat with plume of ostrich feathers, black patent leather Wellington boots with spurs, etc., that is worn on ceremonial occasions. However, that custom fell into disuse and governors now dress in informal wear day-to-day.

=== Titles and honours ===
Governors have during their tenure the style His or Her Excellency the Honourable and their spouses have the style His or Her Excellency. The style used by a former governor is the Honourable.

Since the creation of the Order of Australia in 1975, governors have been routinely invested as Companions of the Order of Australia immediately prior to being commissioned as governor, and several governors including Linda Dessau, Sir James Gobbo, have been appointed Commanders of the Royal Victorian Order (Note: Named in 1896 for Queen Victoria, not the then-colony also named in her honour) for their service to the sovereign as vice-regal representatives. Prior to 1986, Victoria still utilised the imperial honours system, and it was customary for governors to be recognised with awards of Knight Grand Cross or Knight Commander of the Order of St Michael and St George for their service as colonial officials as well as Knight Grand Cross or Knight Commander of the Royal Victorian Order for their services to the sovereign.

Spouses of governors have no official duties but carry out the role of a vice-regal consort. They are entitled to the courtesy style Her Excellency or His Excellency during the office-holder's term of office. Most spouses of governors have been content to be quietly supportive. Some, however, have been notable in their own right, such as Lady Brooks, Margaret, Baroness Huntingfield, and Glyn Davis

=== Governor's personal standard ===
Personal Standard of the Governor of Victoria
- Use: Other
- Proportion: 1:2
- Adopted: 18 April 1984; 42 years ago
- Design: The Governor's badge of a red Southern Cross surmounted by St Edward's Crown, on a golden yellow flag with the Union flag in the upper left (canton) quarter.

The personal standard of the governor of Victoria is the same design as the state flag of Victoria, but with the blue background replaced by gold, and red stars depicting the Southern Cross. The gold is said to represent "Victoria’s golden past and its promise of a golden future".

The current standard has been in place since 1984. Previously, the standard used by Victorian governors after 1870 had been the Union Jack with the Badge of the State of Victoria emblazoned in the centre.

The governor's standard is flown at Government House and on vehicles conveying the governor. The standard is lowered over Government House when the governor is absent from Victoria.

Historical standards of the governor

1870–1877

1877–1901

1901–1984

== Office of the Governor of Victoria ==
The Office of the Governor provides support to the governor to fulfill their constitutional and ceremonial duties, community and international engagements and maintains Government House, including its collections, as a heritage and community asset of national importance.

The Office of the Governor is currently constituted as an administrative office within the Department of Premier and Cabinet under the Public Administration Act 2004. It employed 47 Full-time equivalent staff in 2024 and is headed by the Official Secretary to the Governor.

The official secretary to the governor is Victoria's nominee on the Council of the Order of Australia As of 2025, the official secretary is Jonathan Burke.

== History ==
Charles La Trobe, superintendent of the Port Phillip District of the Colony of New South Wales was appointed the inaugural lieutenant-governor of the new Colony of Victoria on its separation from New South Wales on 1 July 1851. However, he remained subject to Sir Charles FitzRoy who was raised to the position of Governor-General of New South Wales in an early attempt at federalism among the Australian colonies. FitzRoy exercised little authority over the other colonies, particularly after Henry Grey, 3rd Earl Grey resigned as Secretary of State for War and the Colonies in February 1852.

La Trobe had extensive power as lieutenant-governor, able to veto bills passed by the Legislative Council and was responsible for initiating all financial legislation. Within weeks of the new colony being proclaimed, gold was discovered in Ballarat. At the same time as he was called upon to establish the institutions of the new colony, La Trobe also needed to rapidly and drastically expand the area controlled by the new government. Like La Trobe, the other officials of the new government were inexperienced and there were many missteps in the early days of the government as they attempted to manage they tens of thousands of people arriving in the colony in search of gold. The new colony was well-funded from the start, and invested significantly in developing the still-new towns in Melbourne, Ballarat, and the rest of the colony. However, infrastructure remained lacking throughout the gold rush period, and the government was running a budget deficit by the time La Trove returned to the UK.

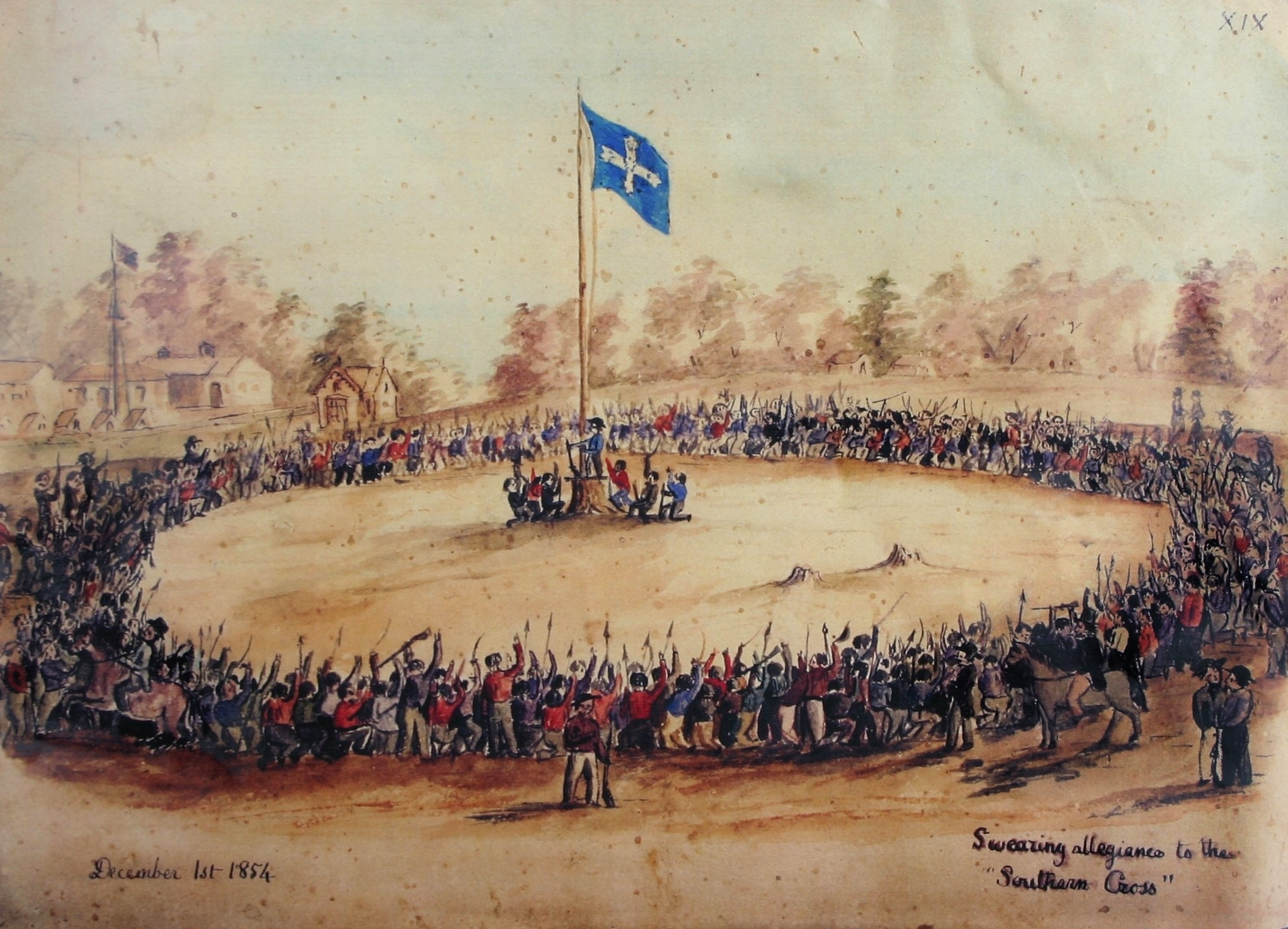
Swearing Allegiance to the Southern Cross by Charles Doudiet, 1854

Despite a last-minute attempt to instead obtain command of a ship when the Crimean War broke out, Captain Sir Charles Hotham relieved La Trobe as lieutenant-governor in June 1854. He attempted to increase government revenue and get the government out of debt by enforcing the mining licences that had been instituted on the goldfields, but at the same time extended political rights to the miners. Hotham was an extremely authoritarian governor for a Crown Colony that was about to be granted responsible government, perhaps influenced by the Eureka Rebellion breaking out within months of his arrival in the colony.

After the nascent rebellion was put down by elements of the 12th Regiment of Foot, the 40th Regiment of Foot and Victoria Police, Hotham had 13 of the miners tried for high treason, however the jury refused to convict them. and he was rebuked by the new colonial secretary, Lord John Russell for mishandling the prosecutions.

=== Responsible government ===
Hotham was appointed as Victoria's first governor following passage of the Victoria Constitution Act 1855 by the imperial parliament. This act formally approved the constitution that had been written by the Legislative Council early in 1854 and established the Legislative Assembly of Victoria, which would begin its first sitting in 1856. When the dispatches returned the approved constitution, they included a provision that the new constitution would not take effect for three months after arrival. Hotham declared that there would be no change to the governance of the state until that time, putting himself and his executive council in conflict with the Legislative Council who believed that the new governor was accountable to legislative oversight. However, this disagreement was short-lived, with Hotham dying on 31 December 1855.

Following the unexpected death of Hotham, the government of Victoria was administered by Major-General Sir Edward Macarthur for most of 1856. The eldest son of the infamous John Macarthur commanded the British Army forces in the colony and had been appointed administrator. Macarthur oversaw the first elections for the Legislative Assembly during the 11 months before the new governor arrived and was well-regarded by the people of Melbourne for his administration.

==== 1865 Supply Crisis ====
In 1865, the government led by James McCulloch announced, and then immediately started collecting, a new tariff. After several months of the Legislative Council refusing to pass the tariff, it was added to a supply bill. Under the colonial constitution, the Legislative Council had no power to amend supply bills and so refused to pass it in its entirety. The first Australian supply crisis begun. Treasurer George Verdon attempted to secure loans to fund the government, but was rejected by all except the London Chartered Bank of Australia. The other banks in the colony published their concerns about the power of the governor and ministry to obtain new loans in the absence of supply, however the influence of their only Victorian director, premier James McCulloch meant that the London Chartered Bank immediately extended a loan of £40,000.

When the government was unable to service the loan the next month, the bank sued for the debt in the Supreme Court and the government offered no defence. After receiving the judgement of the court, the government advised governor Sir Charles Darling to authorise payment for the loan and the bank's costs from the consolidated revenue fund without parliamentary approval, a process that was repeated on a monthly basis. McCulloch took the issue to the electorate by dissolving the Legislative Assembly, and after reelection he continued to try and force the Legislative Council to endorse the new tariff. Various attempts to pass the tariff were rejected by the Legislative Council until the ministry resigned in March 1866, however the Protectionist party held a majority of seat in the Assembly and McCulloch was soon asked to form a new ministry.

Governor Darling's handling of the situation was poorly received by the people of Victoria, newspapers across Australia, and by the colonial office in London. He was recalled in April 1866 and Major General George Carey assumed the administration of the colony until the new governor arrived in August. Darling was widely condemned for allowing the colonial government to so grievously exceed the bounds of constitutional propriety for so long, however, his recall led to a compromise that saw the deadlock resolved, supply restored, and a new tariff bill passed. However, the crisis was not yet quite over.

The Victorian government attempted to gift £20,000 to Lady Darling as compensation for the early termination of Sir Charles' appointment. It was not considered appropriate that the payment be made to Sir Charles directly, however the colonial office was not of a mind to allow the obviously blind and the Secretary of State for the Colonies, Henry Herbert, 4th Earl of Carnarvon sent messages to both the Darlings and the Assembly that the would not be permitted so long as he remained in the Colonial Service. The new governor, Sir John Manners-Sutton, had directions from colonial secretary Henry Pelham-Clinton, 5th Duke of Newcastle not to approve any such payment, so Sir Charles submitted his resignation, but Manners-Sutton was able to convince Newcastle to allow Sir Charles to withdraw it the following year, and he received a pension from the imperial government until he died in 1870.

==== 1878 Supply Crisis ====
At the May 1877 election, with the powerful backing of the Melbourne Age, Graham Berry's liberals won a huge majority in the Assembly and he returned to office at the head of a radical ministry. Berry promised that if the Legislative Council, which was elected on a limited property-based franchise, blocked his program, it would be "dealt with according to its deserts." Given that there was no mechanism in the Victorian Constitution to override the Council, this was taken by conservatives to be a threat of revolutionary violence.

Among other priorities, Berry's government sought to pay members of the Legislative Assembly, a proposal borne of the desire to facilitate middle and working class representation. It was rejected by the Legislative Council, and then tacked to the annual appropriations bill, which was again rejected. After unlawfully sacking over 400 public servants, including magistrates, judges, goldfields commissioners and coroners on what became known as Black Wednesday, Berry's government plunged the state into financial trouble. In an attempt to restore stability, Berry advised governor Sir George Bowen to authorise payments based solely on the approval of the Legislative Council. Bowen authorised these payments after obtaining advice from the attorney-general, but he was reprimanded by the colonial office for approving the payments and allowing other illegal actions of Berry and his ministers.

The Black Wednesday sackings were cancelled, and Bowen was recalled to be assigned as the new Governor of Mauritius, an unimportant backwater Crown Colony that did not have responsible government. Bowen, who had expected to be appointed governor of New South Wales following his time in Victoria, regretted his involvement in the crisis, writing the following year:

My reluctant consent, purely on constitutional grounds, to these dismissals … has damaged my further reputation and my career to a degree that I shall never recover. It will never be forgotten either in England or in the Colony.

=== Post-Federation ===
Following Federation in 1901, the Victorian governors spent the next several decades in a peculiar position. With Melbourne the new nation's temporary capital, John Hope, 7th Earl of Hopetoun and former governor of Victoria, returned to Government House as Governor-General of Australia. His successors remained in residence until Sir Issac Issacs, the first Australian appointed to the position began to live in Canberra full-time in 1930. During this time, the now-state governors resided at Stonnington Mansion.

In 1903, the Victorian parliament first debated abolishing the governor's office on grounds of duplication and economy. Further debates occurred in 1904, 1917, and 1920; the last including a motion that fell only four votes short of calling for the abolition of the office. Governor Sir Arthur Stanley shared their views, requesting an early recall to allow the appointment of a replacement who believed in the utility of his office in 1917. He was convinced by the state government to remain in place until 1920, as ministers feared that public opinion could force them to leave the administration of the state in the hands of an Australian lieutenant-governor.

Between 1931 and 1934, the state was administered by the lieutenant-governor, chief justice Sir William Irvine. During this time, Irvine did not sit as a justice of the supreme court. Irvine was called upon to act as governor for an extended period due to the financial position of the state during the Great Depression. When planning the move, ministers claimed that £7,000 would be saved annually by leaving the post of governor vacant and decommissioning Stonnington as the state's Government House.

==== World War II confidence and supply crises ====
In September 1943, the Country Party government of Sir Albert Dunstan was defeated by a motion of no confidence. When this occurs, the convention is that either the government resigns or a new election is called. Arguing that the 1943 Victorian state election had just been held and no other party had the numbers to form a government, Dunstan attempted to persuade governor Sir Winston Dugan to allow him to remain in office while he negotiated support from the United Australia Party. Dugan instead exercised his reserve powers, requiring the premier to submit his resignation. He then appointed the leader of the opposition, John Cain as premier.

There had been an understanding between Labour and the United Australia Party that UAP leader Thomas Hollway would be the one to be appointed premier. Feeling no loyalty to Cain, the UAP voted with the Country Party to bring down his new government the following day. Instead of submitting his resignation, Cain advised the governor to call for a fresh election, but this advice was refused.

In September 1945, Cain was able to block a supply bill on the floor of the Legislative Assembly. Dunstan's government attempted to pass the bill again, but when it became clear that it did not have the votes to do so, the governor dissolved the assembly and called for an election in November, when the new electoral rolls would be prepared. The proclamation dissolving the legislative assembly did not take effect until the following week, allowing time for an interim supply bill to be passed to fund the election and other aspects of the state government in the meantime.

Cain retained his supporters, and passing a motion explicitly calling on Dunstan to resign, citing the illegal payments made by governments in the 1865 and 1878 supply crises as rationale. Dunstan asked the governor for an immediate dissolution of parliament, but was denied, with Dugan retorting that he was refusing to sanction illegal payments as his 18th-century predecessors had and required the premier's resignation. Both Cain and Holloway were unable to secure the passage of supply to provide for the state's finances until the election, with the deadlock eventually being broken by the appointment of attorney-general Ian Macfarlan as premier to lead a caretaker ministry until the 1945 Victorian state election. After the election John Cain secured a majority and was commissioned as premier, while Dugan was raised to the peerage at the conclusion of his term as governor, becoming Baron Dugan of Victoria.

==== 1952 Supply Crisis ====
The 1950 Victorian state election produced a hung parliament, with the new governor, Sir Dallas Brooks, mediating a minority Country Party government supported on confidence and supply by the Labor Party. This government under premier John McDonald remained in office for two years, before John Cain's Labor Party blocked supply in the Legislative Council in October 1952 in an effort to bring Thomas Holloway to power to lead a caretaker government and institute electoral reform.

Following his defeat on supply, McDonald requested a dissolution but was denied by the governor who appointed Thomas Holloway as premier. Holloway swiftly passed the supply bill through the Legislative Council, funding the government until December. In the Legislative Assembly, Holloway lost a confidence motion, and requested a dissolution of parliament on the grounds that he had achieved his promise of obtaining supply until the election.

However, McDonald argued that Holloway had never achieved the backing of the Legislative Assembly, as he had retained the confidence of the Assembly throughout the incident and was entitled to campaign as premier. After seeking the advice of the chief justices of the supreme court (Edmund Herring) and the high court (Victorian Owen Dixon), Brooks recommissioned McDonald as premier and McDonald immediately requested a fresh election. After this election, John Cain was again commissioned as premier, leading a Labor government.

==== 1955 Confidence and Supply Crisis ====
Cain's third government lasted until the Australian Labor Party split of 1955. After the 1955 Australian federal election, opposition leader H. V. Evatt blamed disloyal elements of the Victorian party for his loss, and set about purging those elements from the party.

With 4 of his ministers amongst the exiled members, Cain requested a dissolution of parliament from the governor. Sir Dallas Brooks again consulted with Herring and Dixon, determining that there was insufficient supply to fund the government until the election, refused to grant a dissolution until supply was passed.

When state parliament was finally summoned, 11 of the ousted Labor MLAs, who would soon establish the virulently anti-communist Democratic Labor Party, (Note: Known as the Australian Labor Party (Anti-Communist) until 1957) joined with Henry Bolte's Liberal and Country Party and the Country Party to pass a motion of no confidence, and as there was sufficient supply to cover the state's expenses through the election, the writs for the 1955 Victorian state election were issued.

==== Later 20th century ====
In 1967, governor Sir Rohan Delacombe was petitioned to exercise the royal prerogative of mercy to commute the execution of Ronald Ryan by four of the jurors in the case who had submitted a guilty verdict in the belief that capital punishment had been abolished in Victoria, and thought Ryan's sentence would be commuted to life imprisonment. Premier Henry Bolte was determined Ryan should hang. Delacombe called a meeting with the Victorian cabinet, at which it was unanimously agreed that the execution should proceed. Ryan was hanged on 3 February 1967, the last person in Australia to be executed.

In 1985, as the Australia Acts 1986 were being developed, Victorian Governor Rear Admiral Sir Brian Murray was embroiled in a scandal. Against the advice of Premier John Cain, (Note: son of the John Cain who was premier during the 1940s and 1950s) Murray had accepted free travel for himself and his wife and was caught up in a police investigation into the use of free airfares by police officers and other state officials. The Premier sought for Elizabeth II to remove Murray, but the British Government was unwilling to act, fearing to appear anachronistic on the eve of the Australia Acts 1986. Cain's attempts to communicate with the Foreign Office were also complicated by the governor being the traditional channel of communication. Sir John Leahy, the British High Commissioner, declined to carry messages on the grounds that he was not accredited to the state governments. Instead, messages were conveyed by the Australian High Commissioner in the United Kingdom, and deputy premier Robert Fordham travelled to London to meet with British ministers. The Foreign Secretary requested legal advice from his department as to the mechanisms of dismissing an Australian state governor, but was ultimately not required to act on the state government's request when Murray submitted his resignation under pressure from the state and Commonwealth governments. There was some enthusiasm amongst the state government for appointing Charles, Prince of Wales to replace Murray as governor, but this was quietly discouraged before a formal request could be made.

== List of governors of Victoria ==
=== Lieutenant-governors ===
Prior to the separation of the Colony of Victoria from New South Wales in 1851, the area was called the Port Phillip District of New South Wales. The governor of New South Wales appointed superintendents of the district. In 1839, Charles La Trobe was appointed superintendent. La Trobe became lieutenant-governor of the new colony of Victoria on separation on 1 July 1851.

From 1850 to 1861, the governor of New South Wales was titled Governor-general of New South Wales in an attempt to form a federal structure. Until Victoria obtained responsible government in 1855, the governor-general of New South Wales appointed lieutenant-governors to Victoria. On Victoria obtaining responsible government in May 1855, the title of the then incumbent lieutenant-governor, Captain Sir Charles Hotham, became governor.

No.	Image	Governor	From	To	Term
1		Charles La Trobe; CB	1 July 1851	5 May 1854	2 years, 309 days
2		Captain Sir Charles Hotham; KCB RN	22 June 1854	22 May 1855	335 days

=== Governors ===
No.	Image	Governor	From	To	Term
1		Captain Sir Charles Hotham; KCB RN	22 May 1855	31 December 1855	224 days
-		(Administrator); Lieutenant General Edward Macarthur; KCB	January 1856	26 December 1856	362 days
2		Sir Henry Barkly; GCMG KCB FRS FRGS	26 December 1856	11 September 1863	6 years, 259 days
3		The Rt Hon Sir Charles Darling; KCB	11 September 1863	7 May 1866	2 years, 239 days
-		(Administrator); Major General George Carey; CB	May 1866	15 August 1866	101 days
4		The Rt Hon John Manners-Sutton, 3rd Viscount Canterbury; GCMG KCB	15 August 1866	2 March 1873	6 years, 200 days
5		Sir George Bowen; GCMG	30 July 1873	22 February 1879	5 years, 208 days
6		George Phipps, 2nd Marquess of Normanby; GCB GCMG PC	29 April 1879	18 April 1884	4 years, 356 days
7		Sir Henry Loch; GCB GCMG	15 July 1884	15 November 1889	5 years, 124 days
8		John Hope, 7th Earl of Hopetoun; KT GCMG GCVO	28 November 1889	28 November 1895	5 years, 227 days
9		Thomas Brassey, 1st Baron Brassey; GCB TD JP	25 October 1895	31 March 1900	4 years, 158 days
10		Sir George Clarke; GCSI GCMG GCIE GBE	10 December 1901	24 November 1903	1 year, 350 days
11		Major-General Sir Reginald Talbot; KCB	25 April 1904	6 July 1908	4 years, 73 days
12		Sir Thomas Gibson-Carmichael; GCSI GCIE KCMG Bt FRSE	27 July 1908	19 May 1911	2 years, 297 days
13		Sir John Fuller; KCMG Bt	24 May 1911	24 November 1913	2 years, 185 days
14		Sir Arthur Stanley; KCMG	23 February 1914	30 January 1920	5 years, 342 days
15		George Rous, 3rd Earl of Stradbroke; KCMG CB CVO CBE VD TD	24 February 1921	7 April 1926	5 years, 43 days
16		Arthur Somers-Cocks, 6th Baron Somers; KCMG DSO MC	28 June 1926	23 June 1931	4 years, 361 days
-		(Lieutenant-Governor); The Hon Sir William Irvine; KCMG	June 1931	14 May 1934	2 years, 326 days
17		William Vanneck, 5th Baron Huntingfield	14 May 1934	4 April 1939	4 years, 326 days
-		(Lieutenant-Governor); The Hon Sir Frederick Mann; KCMG	April 1939	17 July 1939	105 days
18		Major-General Sir Winston Dugan; GCMG CB DSO KStJ	17 July 1939	20 February 1949	9 years, 219 days
-		(Lieutenant-Governor); Lieutenant-General The Hon Sir Edmund Herring; KCMG KBE DSO MC KStJ ED KC	February 1949	18 October 1949	241 days
19		General Sir Dallas Brooks; GCMG KCB KCVO DSO KStJ	18 October 1949	7 May 1963	13 years, 202 days
20		Major General Sir Rohan Delacombe; KCMG KCVO KBE CB DSO KStJ	8 May 1963	31 May 1974	11 years, 24 days
21		Sir Henry Winneke; AC KCMG KCVO OBE QC	1 June 1974	28 February 1982	7 years, 273 days
22		Rear Admiral Sir Brian Murray; KCMG AO RAN	1 March 1982	3 October 1985	3 years, 217 days
-		(Lieutenant-Governor); The Hon Sir John Young; AC KCMG KStJ	3 October 1985	18 February 1986	139 days
23		The Reverend Davis McCaughey; AC	18 February 1986	22 April 1992	6 years, 65 days
24		The Hon Richard McGarvie; AC QC	23 April 1992	23 April 1997	5 years, 1 day
25		Sir James Gobbo; AC CVO QC	24 April 1997	31 December 2000	3 years, 252 days
26		John Landy; AC CVO MBE FTSE	1 January 2001	7 April 2006	5 years, 97 days
27		Professor The Hon David de Kretser; AC FAA FTSE FAHMS	7 April 2006	7 April 2011	5 years, 1 day
28		The Hon Alex Chernov; AC KC	8 April 2011	30 June 2015	4 years, 84 days
29		The Hon Linda Dessau; AC CVO	1 July 2015	30 June 2023	8 years, 0 days
30		Her Excellency The Hon Margaret Gardner; AC FASSA	9 October 2023	Incumbent	3 years, 104 days

== See also ==
- Governor-General of Australia
- Governors of the Australian states
- Monarchy in Australia
