= Lieutenant-Governor of Victoria =

Vice-regal position in Victoria, Australia

- Badge of the Governor of Victoria
- Incumbent; James Angus AO since 12 November 2021
- Office of the Governor, Government of Victoria
- Style: The Honourable
- Nominator: Premier of Victoria
- Appointer: Australian monarch
- Term length: At His Majesty's pleasure
- Website: Governor of Victoria

The lieutenant-governor of Victoria is a government position in the state of Victoria, Australia, acting as a deputy to the Governor of Victoria. When the governor is out of the state, the lieutenant-governor acts as the governor. This office has often been held concurrently by the Chief Justice of Victoria.

== History ==
Prior to the separation of the Colony of Victoria from New South Wales in 1851, the area was called the Port Phillip District of New South Wales. The Governor of New South Wales appointed superintendents of the District. In 1839, Captain Charles La Trobe was appointed superintendent. La Trobe became Lieutenant-Governor of Victoria on Victoria's separation from New South Wales on 1 July 1851. On Victoria obtaining responsible government in May 1855, the title of the then incumbent lieutenant-governor, Captain Sir Charles Hotham, became the Governor of Victoria.

When Victoria became a state, the letters patent provided for a lieutenant-governor, but the office was not filled. Instead, following the practice in New South Wales, the Chief Justice of Victoria acted as the governor when required. This changed on 6 November 1886, when Sir William Stawell, the outgoing Chief Justice, was appointed lieutenant governor. The conferring of honors on retiring dignitaries was a common practice in the UK at the time. After his death in 1889, the position again became vacant until Sir John Madden was appointed lieutenant-governor on 10 June 1899. He had already acted as governor by virtue of being Chief Justice, but in line with Stawell's precedent, his direct appointment as lieutenant-governor superseded the administrative power of the Chief Justice.

== List of lieutenant-governors of Victoria ==
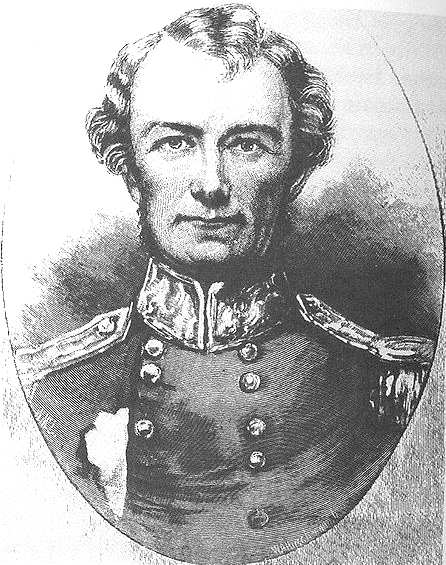
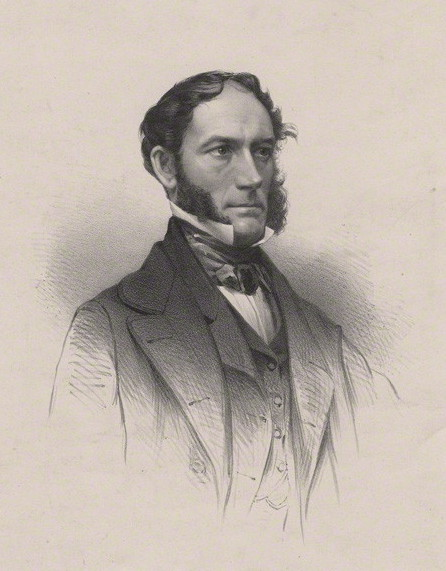
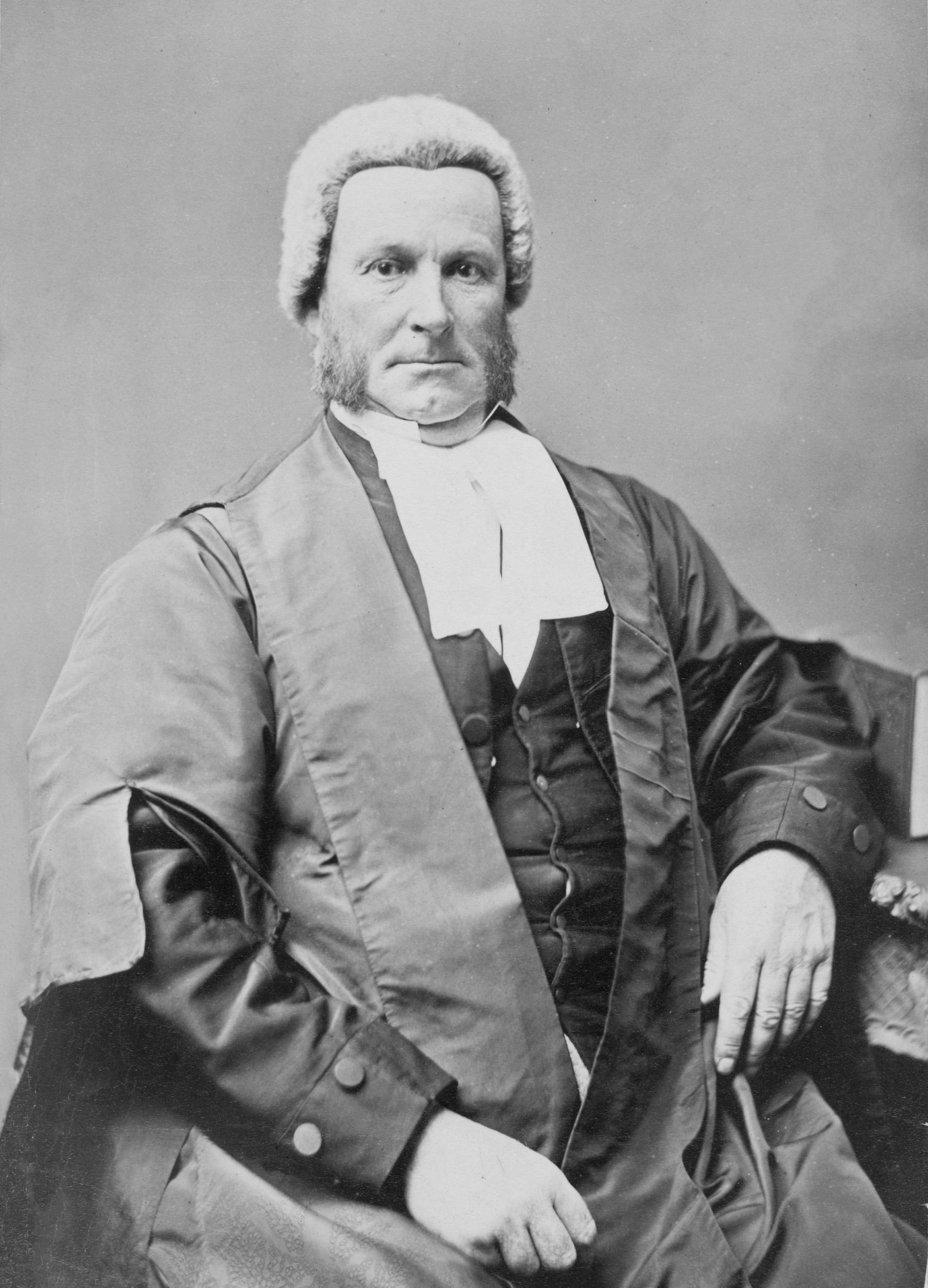
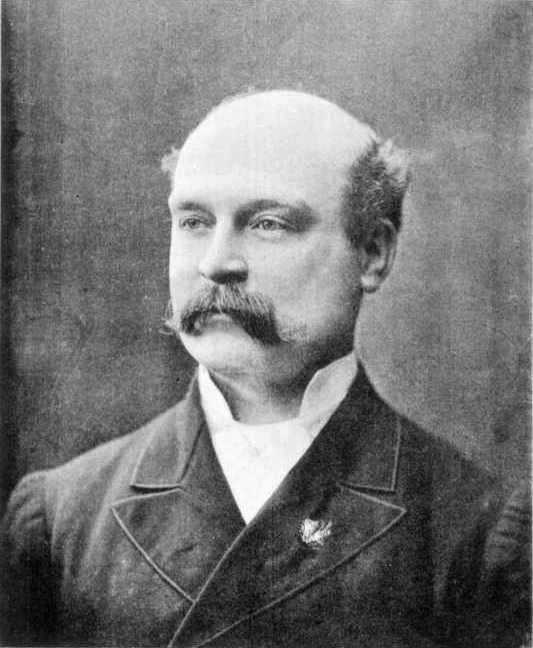
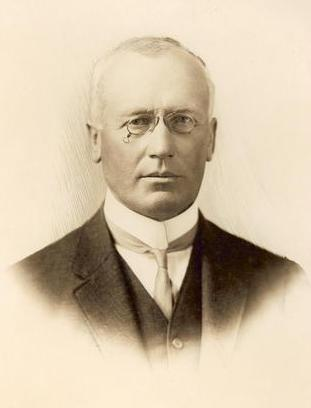
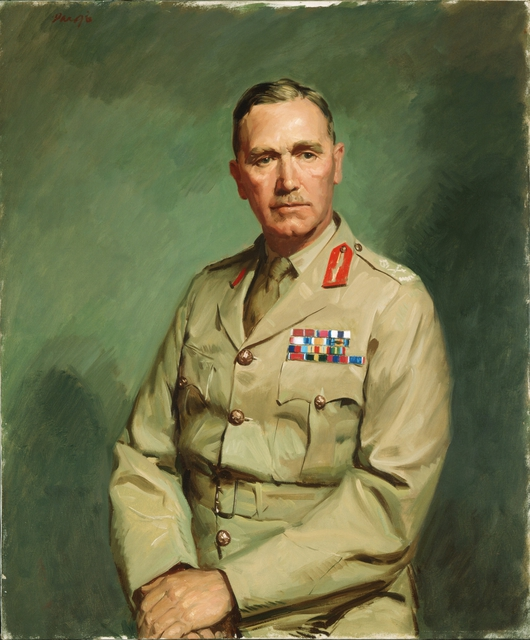
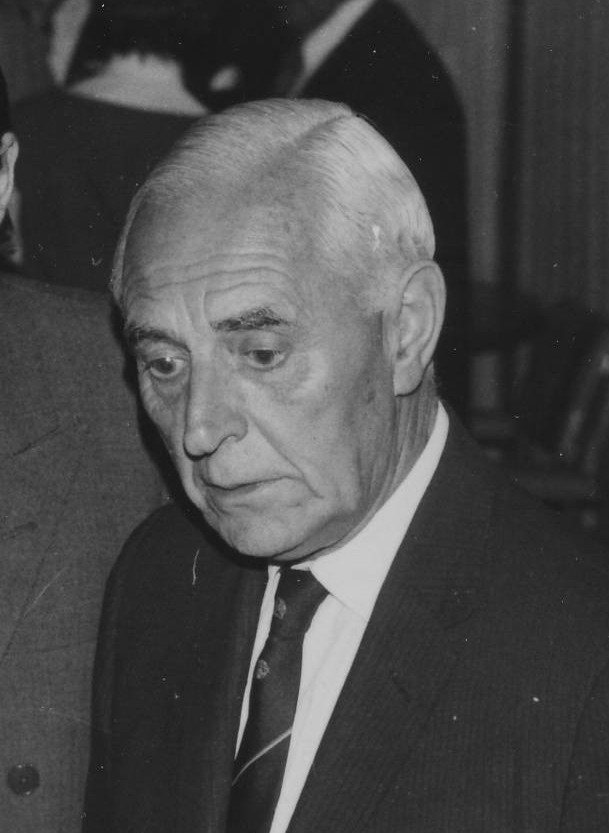
Image	Lieutenant-governor	From	To	Notes	References
	Charles La Trobe	1 July 1851	5 May 1854
	Captain Sir Charles Hotham	22 June 1854	22 May 1855	Governor (May–December 1855)
	Sir William Stawell	6 November 1886	12 March 1889	died
	Sir John Madden	10 June 1899	10 March 1918	Chief Justice (1893–1918); died
	Sir William Irvine	April 1918	January 1936	Chief Justice (1918–1935); resigned
	Sir Frederick Mann	March 1936	April 1945	Chief Justice (1935–1943); resigned
	Sir Edmund Herring	May 1945	2 September 1972	Chief Justice (1944–1964); resigned
	Sir Henry Winneke	31 October 1972	3 June 1974	Chief Justice (1964–1974); Governor (1974–1982)
	Sir John Young	21 July 1974	1995	Chief Justice (1974–1991)
	Sir James Gobbo	October 1995	24 April 1997	Governor (1997–2000)
	Adrienne Clarke	May 1997	2000
	Lady (Marigold) Southey	1 January 2001	4 April 2006
	Marilyn Warren	4 April 2006	9 November 2017	Chief Justice (2003–2017)
	Ken Lay	9 November 2017	12 November 2021
	James Angus	12 November 2021
