= Illingworth =

Illingworth may refer to:

== People ==
- Albert Illingworth, 1st Baron Illingworth (1865–1942), British businessman and politician
- Alfred Illingworth (1827–1907), English worsted spinner and politician
- A. E. Illingworth (1868–1942), Australian Church of Christ minister
- Charlie Illingworth (1871–1926), Australian rules footballer
- Charles Illingworth (1899–1991), British surgeon
- Eddie Illingworth (born 1938), Australian cricketer
- Edward Illingworth (1896–1924), English cricketer
- Francisco Illingworth (1905–1982), Vice President of Ecuador
- Frederick Illingworth (1844–1908), Australian land agent and politician
- George Illingworth (1877–1950), Australian politician
- Illingworth Kerr (1905–1989), Canadian landscape painter
- James Illingworth (born ?), British Army officer
- Jeremy Illingworth (born 1977), English footballer
- Jim Illingworth (1901–1967), Australian rules footballer
- John Illingworth (English Officer) (1786–1853), British naval officer, Ecuadorian Founding Father, South American Admiral
- John Illingworth (yacht designer) (1903–1980), British naval architect
- John Illingworth (footballer) (1904–1964), English footballer
- John Lister Illingworth Fennell (1918–1992), British historian
- J. R. Illingworth (1848–1915), British Anglican priest and academic
- Julian Illingworth (born 1984), American professional squash player
- Leslie Gilbert Illingworth (1902–1979) British cartoonist
- Lucy Illingworth, English pianist
- Max Illingworth (born 1992), Australian Chess Grandmaster
- Nelson Illingworth (1862–1926), English sculptor
- Nigel Illingworth (born 1960), English cricketer
- Percy Illingworth (1869–1915), British politician
- Philip Illingworth (born 1948), Canadian judoka
- Ray Illingworth (1932–2021), English cricketer
- Richard Illingworth (born 1967), English cricketer and umpire
- Ronald Illingworth (1909–1990), British paediatrician
- Sarah Illingworth (born 1963), New Zealand cricketer
- Simon Illingworth (born 1967), Australian anti-corruption spokesman
- William Illingworth (archivist) (1764–1845), English lawyer and archivist
- William H. Illingworth (1844–1893), English photographer

Fictional

- Lord Illingworth, a fictional character from the 1893 play A Woman of No Importance by Oscar Wilde

== Places ==
- Firebase Illingworth, a former United States Army firebase in southwestern Vietnam
- Illingworth, Alberta, a locality in Canada
- Illingworth, West Yorkshire, England, a suburb of Halifax
