= Victoria Police Air Wing =

Australian state police aviation unit

Air Wing
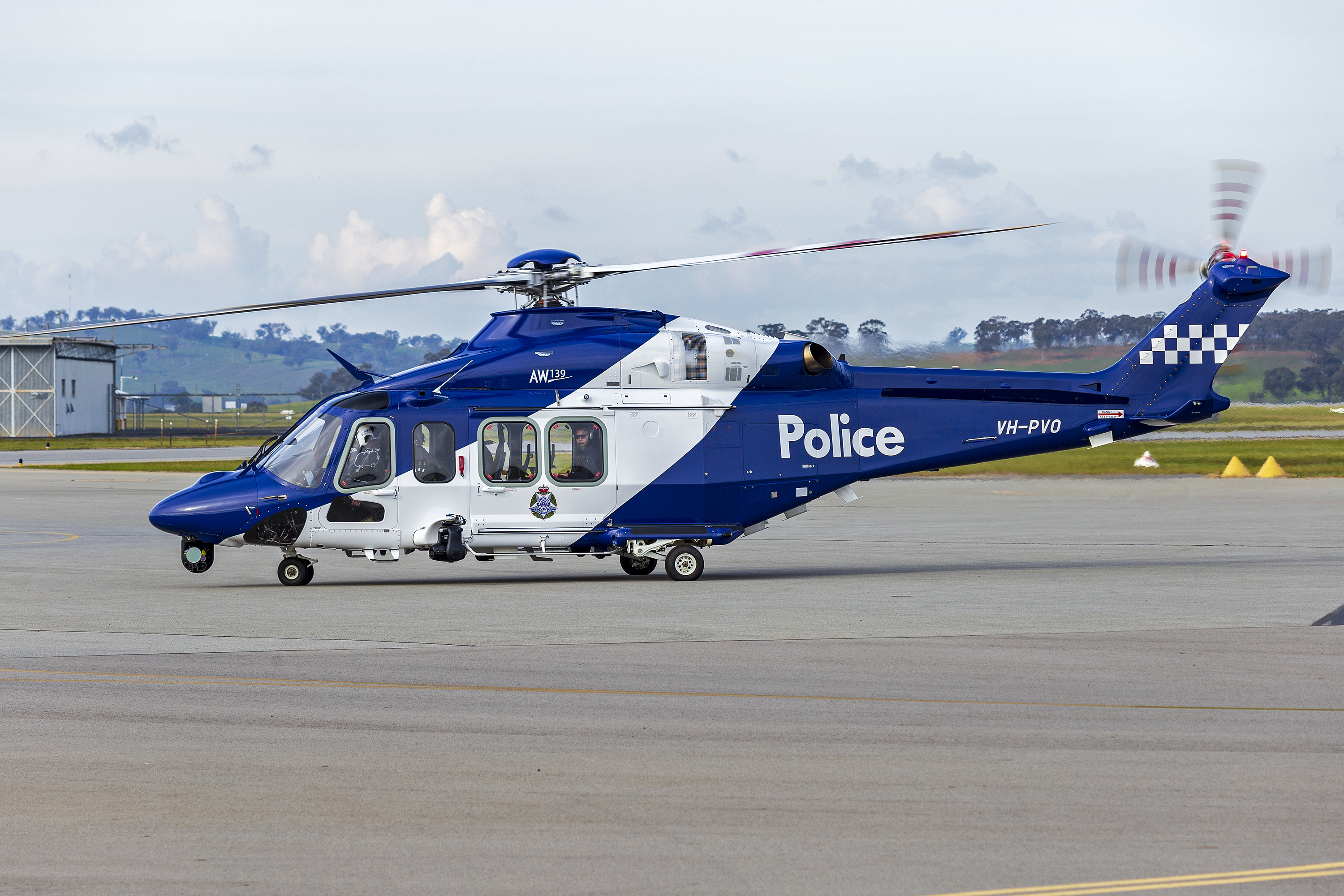
- AW139
- Active: May 1975 – present
- Country: Australia
- Agency: Victoria Police
- Role: Law enforcement; Search and Rescue
- Part of: Specialist Response Division
- Headquarters: Essendon Airport

Equipment
- Aircraft: 3 AW139; 1 King Air 350ER

The Air Wing is the police aviation unit of Victoria Police that operates in metropolitan Melbourne and provides a service to the whole of Victoria.

The Air Wing operates a fleet of three Leonardo AW139 helicopters and a Beechcraft Super King Air fixed-wing aircraft. The Air Wing responds to more than 5000 taskings per year.

== History ==
The Air Wing was formed in 1975 after members of the Victoria Police Aero Club demonstrated to Victoria Police and government the potential of utilising aviation assets for policing roles. The first operational flight was on 22 May 1975 of a fixed wing aircraft. The Air Wing initially leased single engine and twin engine fixed wing aircraft. Various planes were operated including the Aero Commander 500S/Shrike Commander and the PA-31-350 Navajo Chieftain. The last planes operated by the Air Wing were two twin engine Aero Commander. The government did not renew the three-year lease and it expired on 30 June 1993. Approximately 95% of all flights had been for transportation. The government instead provided Victoria Police with access to the existing government charter service by Victorian Airlines. In 2005, the Office of Police Integrity recommended that Victoria Police have fixed wing aircraft for the urgent deployment of specialist police to regional Victoria.

In 1976, the first helicopter pilot joined the Air Wing. In 1977, the Air Wing conducted a six-week evaluation trial of flying regular helicopter patrols. In 1978, the Air Wing leased a Hughes 500D helicopter conducting night time operations. In the same year, a decision was made to purchase a helicopter. In 1979, the Air Wing purchased a twin-engined Aérospatiale SA365C1 Dauphin 2 (VH-PVF), the first of its kind in Australia, with another two former VIP aircraft purchased in 1986 from the Romanian Government (VH-PVA and VH-PVK). On Sunday, 9 August 1987, Air 495 (VH-PVA, the Air Ambulance) was hit by gunfire during its part in the Hoddle Street massacre, and was forced to land in a nearby park.

A single-engined Aérospatiale AS350B Squirrel was added to the fleet in 1988 for routine operations such as surveillance and traffic patrol in the country areas of Victoria, as well as pilot training duties.

In 1996 police helicopter services began to be outsourced and the helicopters sold to Lloyd Helicopters of Australia (now CHC Helicopters), with the aircraft and their maintenance being leased back. Pilots and tactical flight officers (TFO) continue to be provided by the Victoria Police. In December 1998, the Air Wing was involved in the search and rescue effort to rescue sailors participating in the Sydney to Hobart Yacht Race in severe weather conditions. From 2001, the Air Wing began to re-equip with new aircraft provided by CHC Helicopters, with the "much loved" SA365C1 models being replaced by their more powerful and much upgraded derivative, the AS365N3 Dauphin.

Along with the three new Dauphin helicopters, the Squirrel was also replaced with a new twin-engined Eurocopter EC135 T2+ that fulfilled the same role. The two engines of the EC135 meant it was able to safely operate over urban areas where the single-engined Squirrel was limited or excluded. While the new aircraft had much greater capabilities over the previous generation, such as HD Forward looking infrared (FLIR), LogiMap moving map software and Night Vision Goggles (NVG), the new aircraft were also significantly quieter, an important feature when operating over urban areas. The EC135 was not fitted with a hoist so was unable to perform a search and rescue role if the mission required an extraction.

In February 2009, the Air Wing moved into new, larger facilities at Essendon Airport that allowed them to be co-located with Air Ambulance Victoria, with whom they had a partnership, and their Bell 412 specialist aeromedical helicopter.

In 2011, AS365N3 Dauphin VH-PVH assisted the Western Australia Police with the Commonwealth Heads of Government Meeting 2011 CHOGM 2011 held in Perth.

In 2016, it was announced that three new helicopters would be purchased with funding of $63.2 million to replace the ageing Dauphin fleet and to introduce a fixed wing plane. In October 2018, it was announced that the Dauphin would be replaced by the Leonardo AW139 provided by StarFlight Victoria and that the Beechcraft Super King Air 350ER provided by Skytraders had been selected to re-introduce a fixed wing capability. The AW139 has a longer endurance and longer range compared to the Dauphin while the Super King Air has more than double the endurance and range to the Dauphin. The Super King Air will be fitted with the same daylight and infrared camera and mapping and image detection systems as the AW139 and will be flown by contracted pilots. The Super King Air will enable a faster response time to regional and remote areas for tactical deployments of the SOG and the CIRT and by investigators from the Major Collision Investigation Unit.

In 2019, the Air Wing retired the EC135 from service. In October 2019, the Air Wing established a Drone Unit to operate the DJI Matrice 210 drone and to manage all drones within Victoria Police including training other police units to operate basic drones.

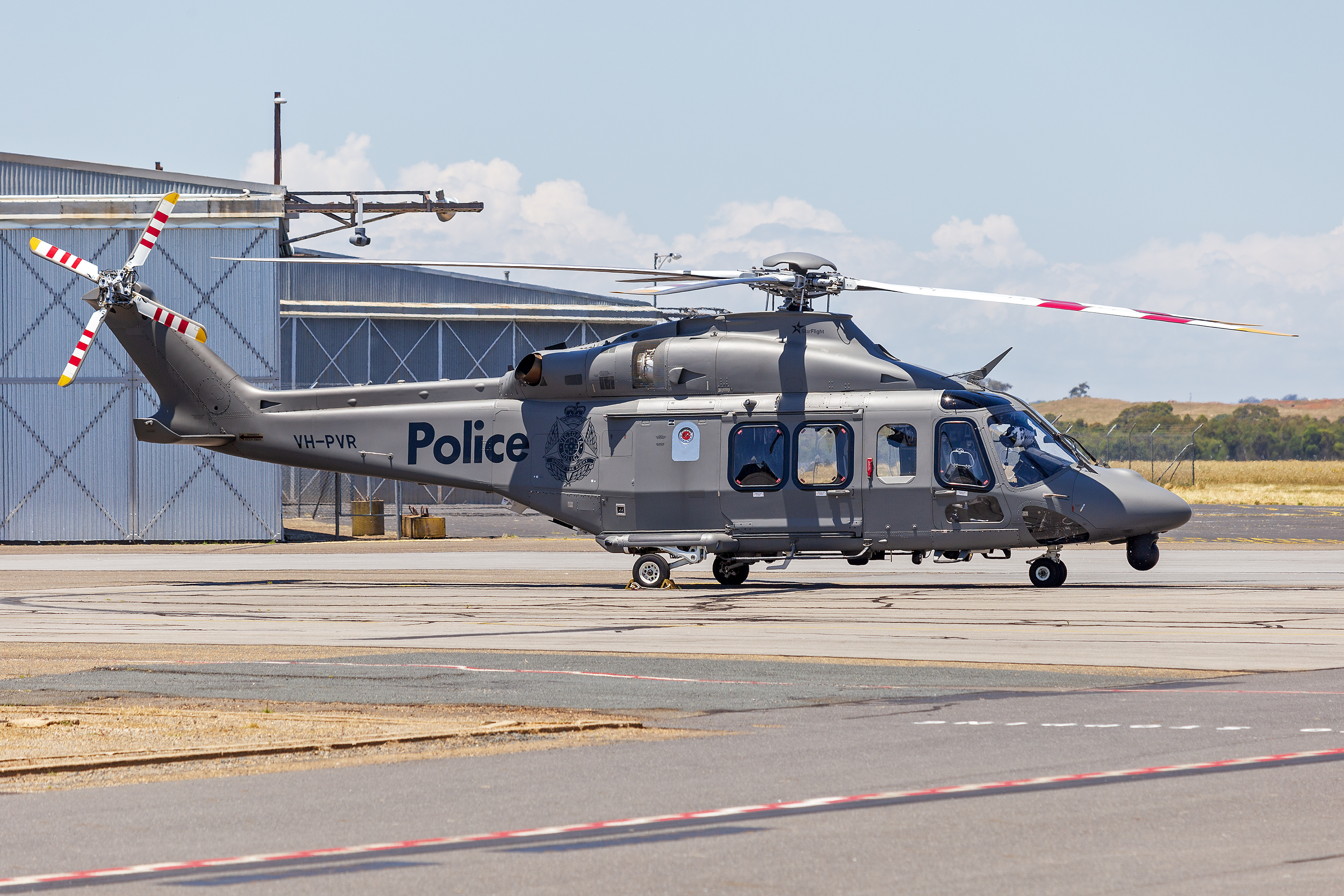
AW139 in the grey livery

In June 2020, the first of the AW139 helicopters entered service with the remaining to enter service shortly after. One of the AW139 helicopters is in grey livery with the other two are in white and blue livery similar to the Dauphin fleet. In August 2020, the Super King Air 350ER entered service. In December 2020, an AW139 conducted the first landing on the helipad of the new 39-storey police headquarters which had opened in June 2020.

=== Air Ambulance Victoria Partnership ===
The Victoria Police Air Wing had a partnership with Air Ambulance Victoria (AAV) from 1986 to 2017 to provide a 24-hour emergency air ambulance capability utilising one of the Dauphin helicopters. This helicopter call sign Air 495 was fitted out for the aeromedical role. The partnership covered joint operations and joint use of the aeromedical Dauphin so it could be utilised for police roles when not required for evacuation, as well as providing a replacement Dauphin helicopter while it is receiving maintenance. This co-operation was aided by having the two organisations sharing facilities at Essendon Airport.

In January 2017, Ambulance Victoria entered into service the last of five new AgustaWestland AW139 helicopters, to be based at Essendon replacing the service provided by the Air Wing Dauphin. The air ambulance Dauphin Air 495 was subsequently reconfigured from its aeromedical configuration to become a dedicated police helicopter.

== Roles ==
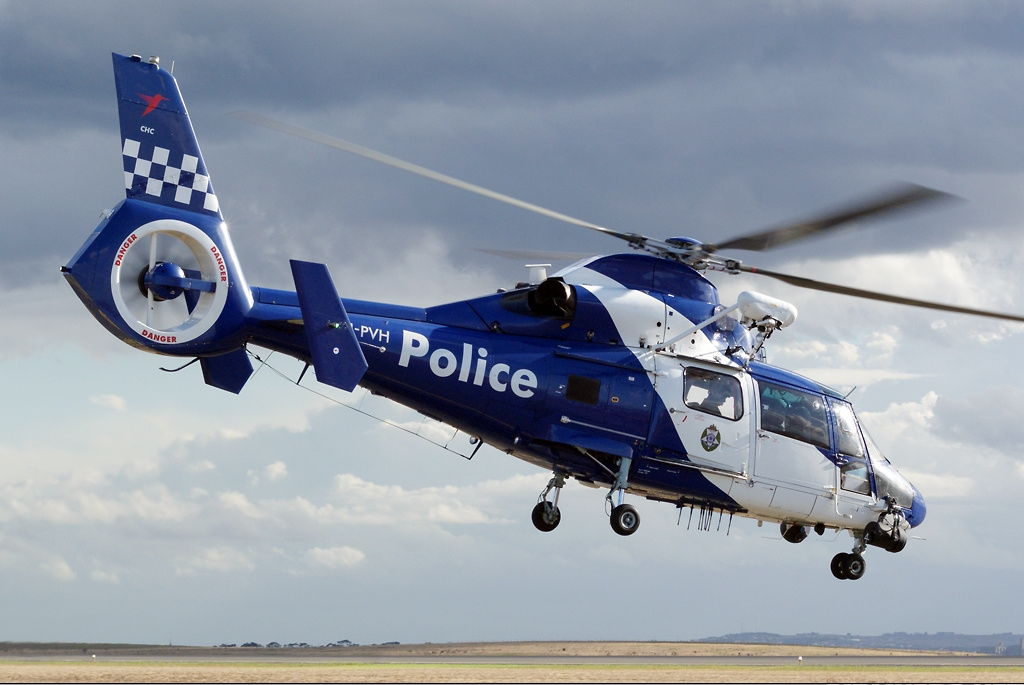
Dauphin 2 helicopter

The Air Wing undertake a wide variety of roles including:

- Crime prevention and detection through regular patrols,
- Traffic surveillance of major traffic thoroughfares,
- Air-to-ground direction, guiding police on the ground to their targets,
- Search and Rescue for missing people at sea and in remote places,
- Fire duties utilising a fire bucket as an aerial fire bomber, and providing the Country Fire Authority (CFA) and the Metropolitan Fire Brigade (MFB) with aerial observation support,
- Photographic tasks providing aerial photography for crime, traffic, planning and routine operations, as well as covert surveillance, observation and photography of criminal activities,
- Tactical deployments.

The majority of pilots are civilian sourced pilots who are required to attend the police academy to complete several police recruit courses to become a sworn officer.

== Aircraft ==
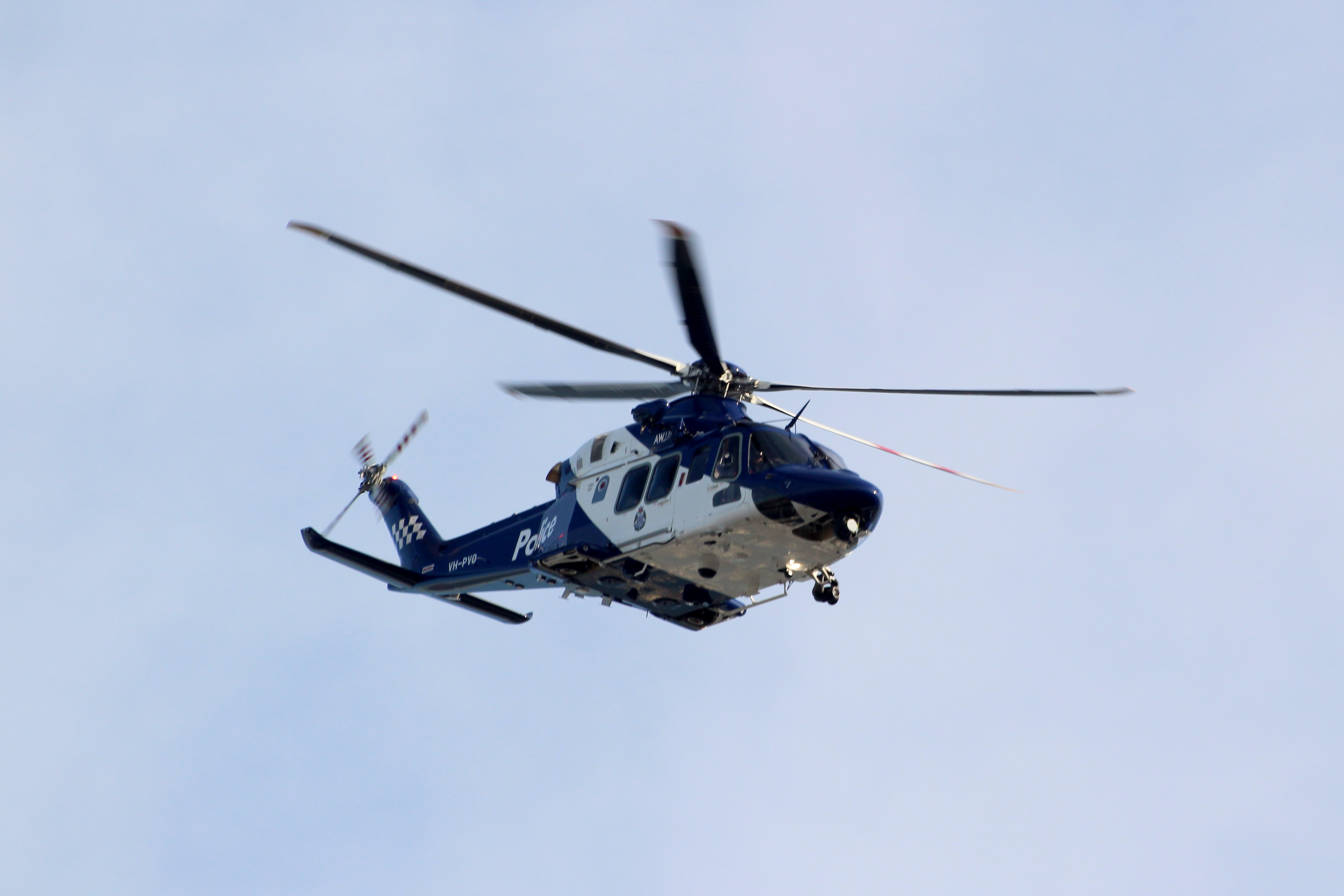
AW139 VH-PVO above Melbourne City, on its delivery flight.

Current Aircraft
Model	Registration	Serial No.	Year built	ICAO hex	Notes
Beechcraft King Air 350ER	VH-PVE	FL-1181	2019	7C4EE8	POL35 - Delivered 22 June 2020
AgustaWestland AW139	VH-PVO	31878	2019	7C4EF2	POL30 - Delivered 11 June 2020
AgustaWestland AW139	VH-PVQ	31884	2019	7C4EF4	POL31 - Delivered 17 July 2020
AgustaWestland AW139	VH-PVR	31885	2019	7C4EF5	POL32 - Delivered 17 July 2020 (Military grey livery)

Past Aircraft
Model	Registration	Serial No.	Year built	Years	Notes
Eurocopter AS365N3 Dauphin	VH-PVD	6846	2009	2002 - 2020	POL36 - ICAO hex 7C4EE7, exported to Ghana January 2021, now registered 9G-VRA
Eurocopter AS365N3 Dauphin	VH-PVG	6597	2001	2002 - 2020	POL34 - ICAO hex 7C4EEA, exported January 2021
Eurocopter AS365N3 Dauphin	VH-PVH	6604	2001	2002 - 2020	POL33 - ICAO hex 7C4EEB, exported January 2021
Aero Commander 500 type				? – 1993	
Aérospatiale SA365C1 Dauphin 2	VH-PVF	5042		1979–2002	First Air Wing helicopter. In private hands, restored and on display at the Moorabbin Air Museum (Victoria).
Aérospatiale SA365C1 Dauphin 2	VH-PVA	5025		1986–2010	
Aérospatiale SA365C1 Dauphin 2	VH-PVK	5033		1986–2001	Donated to CQ Rescue, Queensland. Withdrawn 2010.
Aérospatiale AS350BA Squirrel	VH-PVM	2058	1987	1988–2010	
Eurocopter EC135 T2+	VH-PVE	0834	2009	2010–2019	Now registered as N834UW.

== See also ==
- New South Wales Police Force – Police Aviation Support Branch
- Northern Territory Police – Air Wing
- Queensland Police Service - POLAIR
- Western Australia Police – Police Air Wing
