= Victoria Police Public Order Response Team =

Unit of Victoria Police, Australia

Public Order Response Team
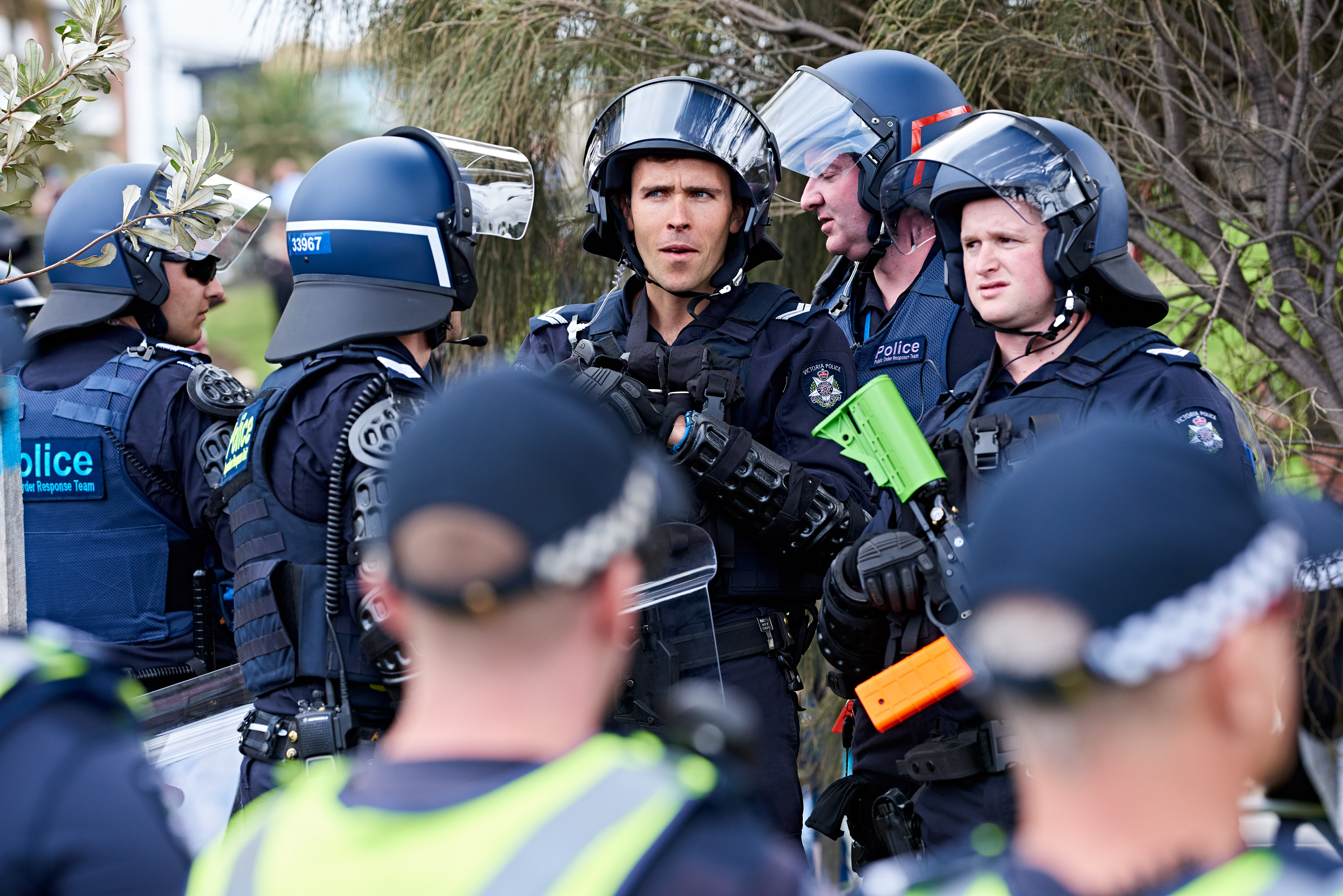
- Officers at a rally in 2019
- Active: 2011–present
- Country: Australia
- Agency: Victoria Police
- Role: Law enforcement; Riot control
- Part of: Operations Support Division
- Headquarters: Melbourne
- Abbreviation: PORT

Structure
- Officers: 324

The Public Order Response Team (PORT) is the full-time riot unit of the Victoria Police. PORT was formed in June 2011 and was originally part of the Operations Response Unit (ORU). The core function of PORT is to respond to demonstrations and public order incidents within metropolitan Melbourne. PORT may be tasked to assist with search warrants and with situations that require a highly visible police presence.

== History ==
The Force Response Unit (FRU) was established in 1993 to provide assistance to police districts throughout the state with public order, emergency and general operational incidents that were, or anticipated to be, beyond the resourcing capabilities of the district. In December 1993, the FRU cleared demonstrators 'picket line' at the Richmond Secondary College using a violent baton charge to forcibly remove them. In February 1994, the FRU cleared environmental demonstrators blocking a Minister's office, using pressure point tactics to forcibly remove them. In September 2000, 953 police officers drawn from throughout the state, led by the FRU, were confronted by thousands of protestors, including violent protestors, at the S11 protest at the World Economic Forum held at Crown Casino. In 2004, the FRU launched the Critical Incident Response Team (CIRT) concept to also provide tactical support.

The Operations Response Unit (ORU) was formed on 1 March 2010 to provide assistance to police service areas throughout the state with public safety, road policing and crime issues and had a total strength of 229 officers. The ORU assumed many of the FRU roles, displaced during the evolution of the CIRT concept, and of which Victoria Police had identified a need for a dedicated large unit from the Black Saturday bushfires. In June 2011, the ORU established PORT with 42 officers trained in crowd control and riot formations and equipped with specially designed uniforms and highly visible police vehicles. In 2012, the ORU had a total strength of 289 officers of which 105 officers had received PORT training. In 2014, PORT had 65 qualified officers.

The Victoria Police Blue Ribbon Foundation released a 'Constable T. Bear' in 2013 based on the Public Order Response Team.

== Structure ==
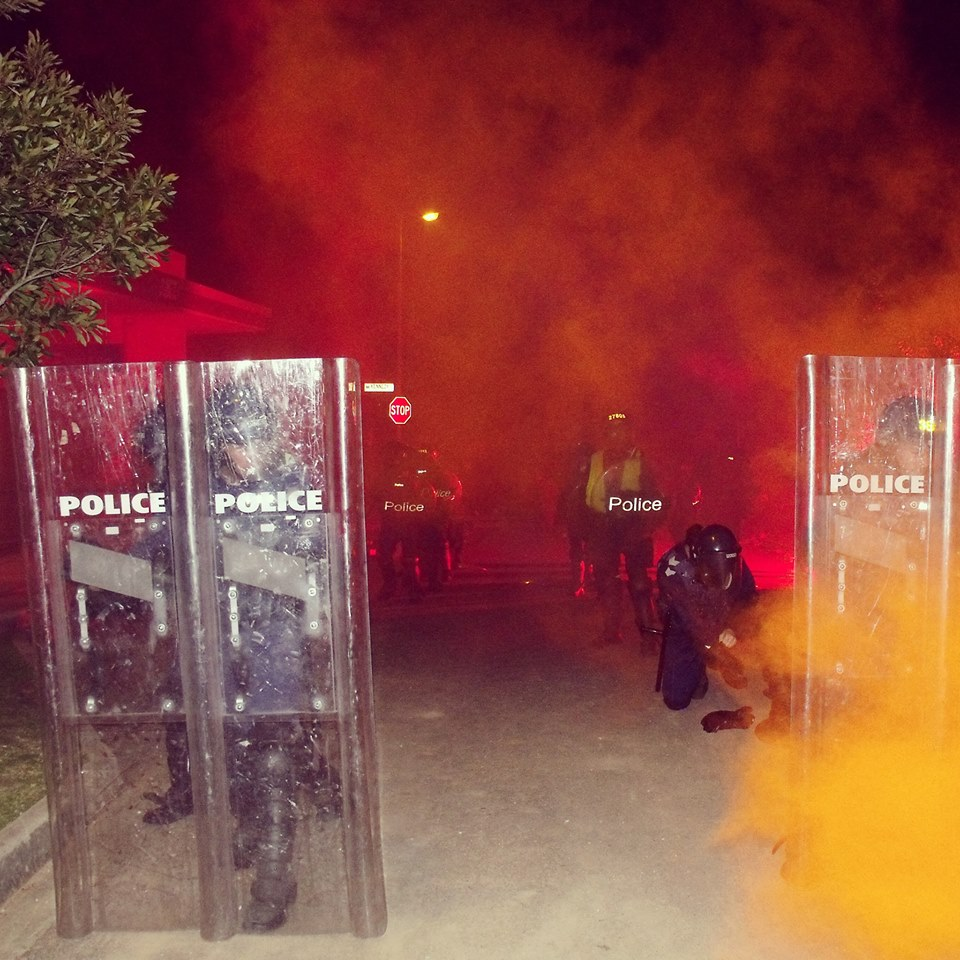
PORT in training

The Public Order Response Team is part of the Operations Support Division of the Transit and Public Safety Command. In 2012, the ORU consisted of five teams: four ORU teams and one PORT.

In 2016, the government provided funding of A$7.6 million to the ORU ongoing over five years as part of the Public Safety Package to improve PORT's response to public order incidents and events. New specialist vehicles, equipment and uniforms were purchased, 40 additional officers allocated to PORT and increased training was delivered. In 2018, Victoria Police said that all of the 324 officers in the ORU would now be required to complete the Public Order Response Team course to be able to supplement PORT if required.

In 2021, Police Life magazine reported that the Operations Response Unit was now known as the Public Order Response Team.

== Operations ==
PORT was involved in the removal of Occupy Melbourne from the City Square in October 2011, the Grocon Emporium site CFMEU dispute in August 2012 over three weeks, and the East West Link Tunnel Protests in January 2014. PORT was involved in the COVID-19 protests in August 2021 to September 2021 that were described as the most violent and largest police operation in Victoria since the S11 protests in 2000.In September 2024, PORT would be involved in the Melbourne Land Forces Expo protests.

PORT regularly deploys large numbers of officers to A-League soccer matches held within Victoria.

PORT provides core assistance each weekend to Operation Safe Streets in the Melbourne CBD conducted on a Friday and Saturday night. Their focus is on visiting licensed premises and other popular late night venues and also assist with out of control parties as well as generalised public order policing. The Safe Streets Taskforce is a highly visible police operation conducted in areas with alcohol related public order issues.

In 2026, for the first time in Victoria Police history, PORT officers equipped with their semi-automatic rifles will patrol the Melbourne Cup horse race at Flemington Racecourse.

== Equipment ==
PORT is issued with a range of crowd control and riot equipment. PORT officers are equipped with a PR-24 rigid side handle baton, plastic handcuffs, helmet, light weight body armour and gas masks. PORT officers use three types of shields: round, intermediate and long. In March 2018, PORT introduced new tactical equipment including the VKS Pepperball paintball gun for pepper balls and paintballs, Stinger rubber ball grenades, stun grenades, OC canister grenades and the Penn Arms L140-4 40mm grenade launcher for foam baton rounds. PORT commenced using the new tactical equipment operationally in September 2018.

In mid-2020, PORT officers received training in the Daniel Defense DDM4V7S semi-automatic rifle which will be securely carried in their vehicles to enable officers to respond to active armed offender and terrorist attacks.

PORT officers regular vehicle is a Toyota Kluger that allows rapid deployment to metropolitan and country locations at short notice. PORT has four Renault Trafic equipment vans and a command truck. In 2018, PORT took delivery of four transporters a Mercedes-Benz Sprinter van capable of carrying up to eight officers and their equipment.

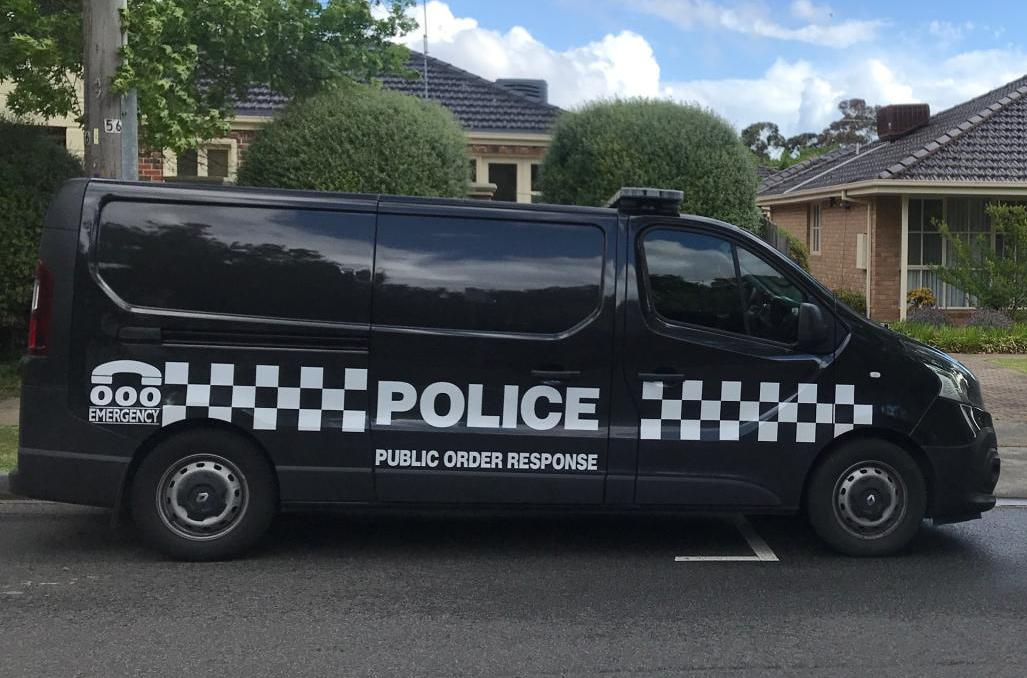
Public Order Response Equipment Carrier

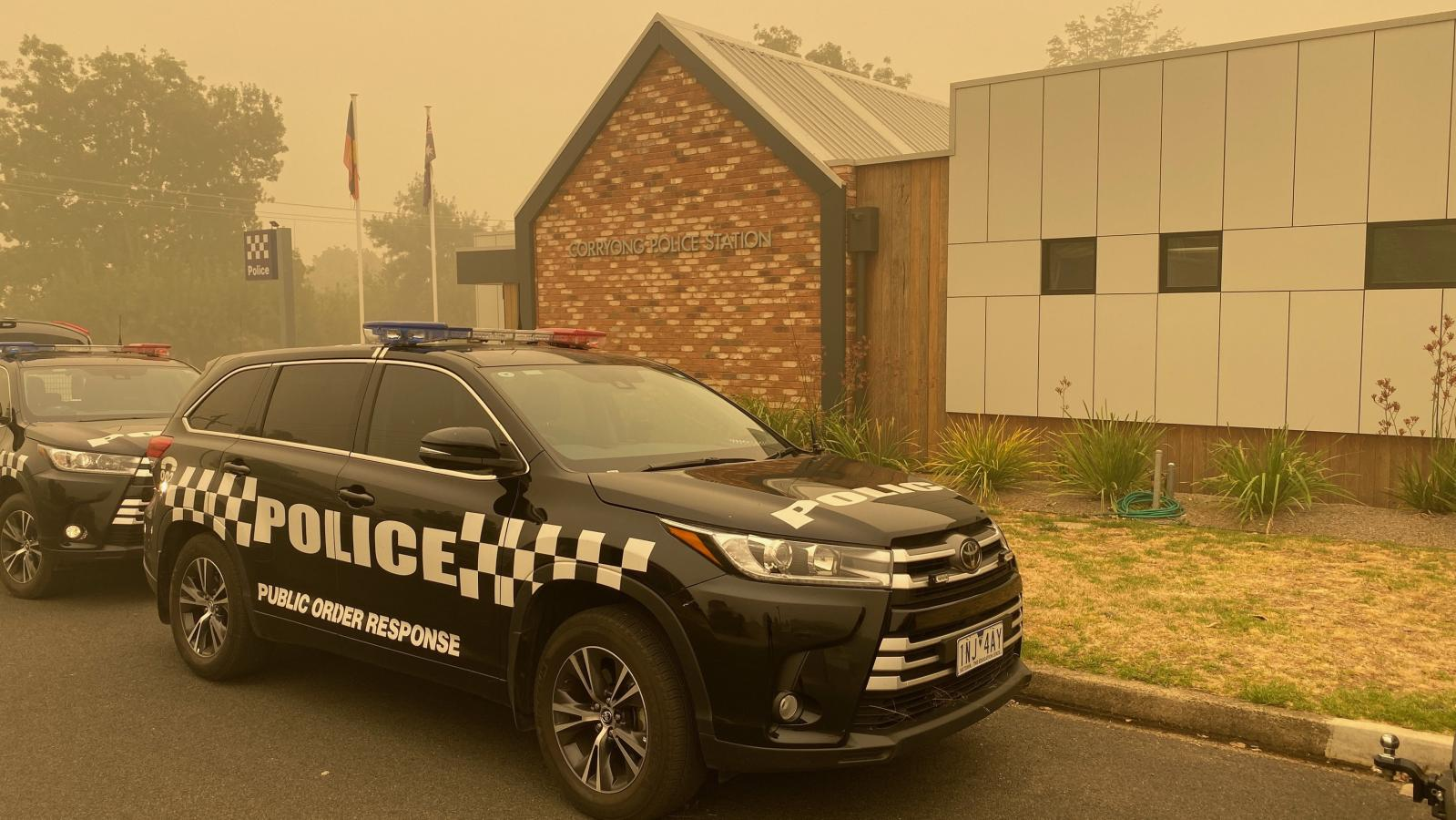
Public order response vehicle, Toyota Kluger

== See also ==
- NSW Police Public Order and Riot Squad
