= Victoria Police =

Police service of Victoria, Australia

- Badge of the Victoria Police

- Flag of the Victoria Police
- Motto: Uphold the Right "Tenez le Droit" until November 1986

Agency overview
- Formed: 8 January 1853
- Employees: 21,326 (June 2023)
- Annual budget: A$4.13 billion (2023–24)

Jurisdictional structure
- Operations jurisdiction: Victoria, Australia
- Victoria Police jurisdiction
- Area: 237,659 square kilometres
- Population: 6,689,377
- Legal jurisdiction: As per operations jurisdiction
- Governing body: Government of Victoria
- Constituting instrument: Victoria Police Act 2013 (VIC)
- General nature: Civilian police

Operational structure
- Overseen by: Independent Broad-based Anti-corruption Commission
- Headquarters: Victoria Police Centre; 311 Spencer Street; Docklands37°48′51″S 144°57′05″E
- Sworn officers: 15,842 (June 2023)
- Minister responsible: Anthony Carbines, Minister for Police
- Agency executive: Mike Bush, Chief Commissioner
- Units: List: Air Wing; Armed Crime Squad; Arson & Explosives Squad; Bomb Response Unit; Central Property Management Unit; Crime Scene Services; Criminal Investigation Unit; Criminal Proceeds Squad; Critical Incident Response Team; Divisional Intelligence Unit; Divisional Licensing Unit; Dog Squad; Family Violence Investigation Unit; General Duties; Heavy Vehicle Unit; Highway Patrol; Homicide Squad; Licensing Services Branch; Major Collision Investigation Unit; Major Drug Squad; Media Unit; Missing Persons Squad; Mounted Branch; Prosecutions Court Branch; Organised Motor Vehicle Theft Squad; Public Order Response Team; Regional Response Unit; Regions and Transit Safety Unit; Search and Rescue Squad; Sexual Offences & Child Abuse Investigation Team; Sex Industry Coordination Unit; Special Operations Group; State Highway Patrol Solo Unit; State Liquor Unit; State Surveillance Unit; Vehicle Impound Unit; Water Police
- Regions: Western, Eastern, North West Metro, Southern Metro

Facilities
- Stations: 333 (2019), 185 police residences, 96 other facilities

Website
- police.vic.gov.au

Victoria Police is the primary law enforcement agency of the Australian state of Victoria. It was formed in 1853 and currently operates under the Victoria Police Act 2013.

As of June 2023, Victoria Police has 21,326 staff, comprising 15,842 police officers, 1,412 Protective Services Officers, 346 Police Custody Officers and 216 Police Recruits in training, 2 reservists and 3,507 Victorian Public Service (VPS) employees across 333 police stations. Victoria Police's budget for 2023–2024 is A$4.13 billion.

Between 31 July 2018 and 18 July 2019, Victoria Police recorded 514,398 offences, an increase of 1.5% from the previous year. Victoria Police also responded to 897,016 emergency calls, a reduction of 0.3% from previous year.

== History ==
=== Background ===
A couple of years after the first Europeans settled there, in September 1836 the area around Melbourne, known as the District of Port Phillip, became part of the colony of New South Wales. From 1851 until 1901 it became the Colony of Victoria, with its own government within the British Empire. In 1901 it became a state of the new Commonwealth of Australia.

=== Early history ===
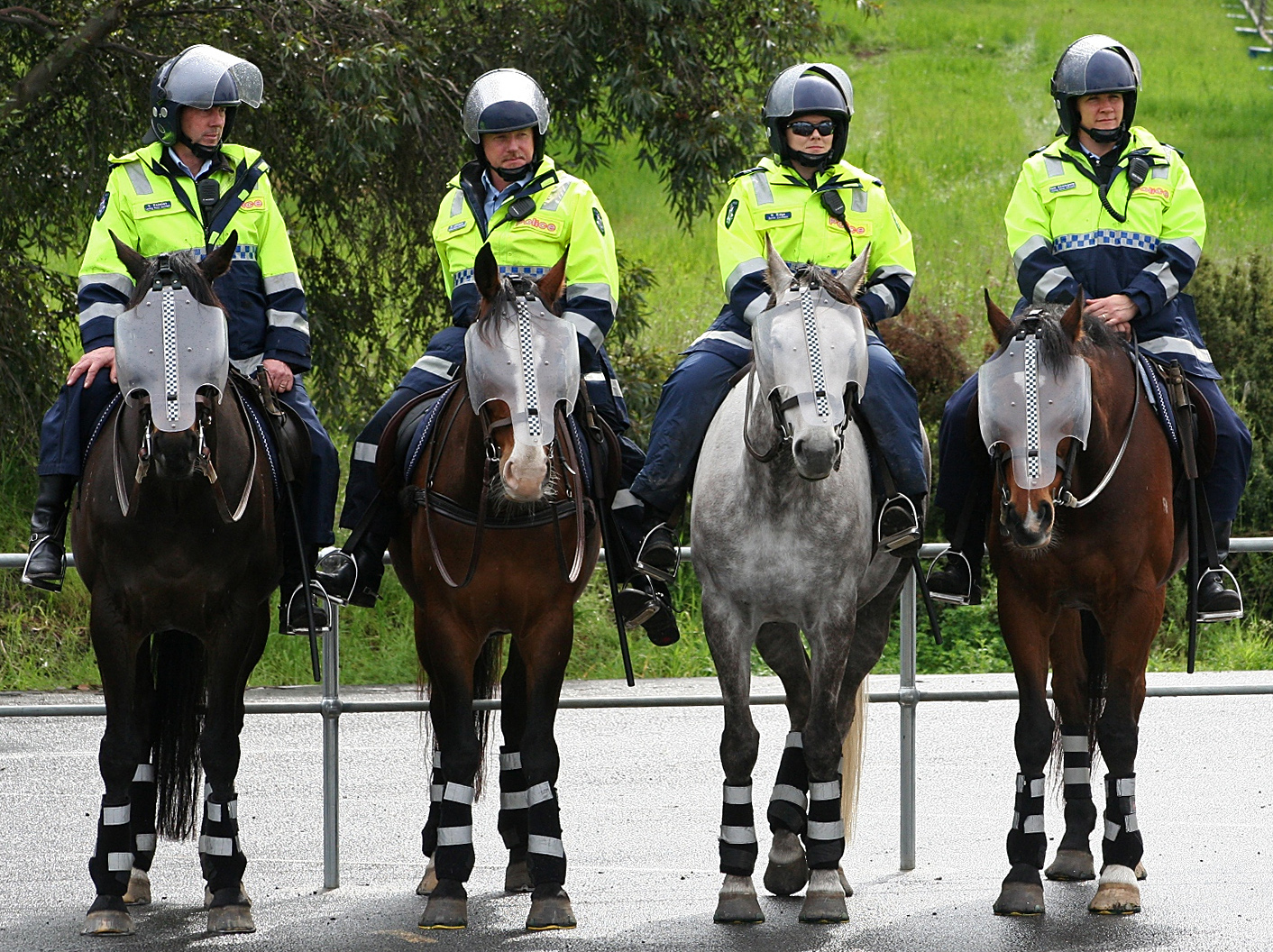
Mounted officers of the Victoria Police

The early settlers of Melbourne provided their own police force, and in 1840 there were 12 constables who were paid two shillings and nine pence per day, and the chief constable was Mr. W. (Tulip) Wright. Charles Brodie followed Wright as chief constable in 1842 and was succeeded by W. J. Sugden, who held the positions of 'town chief constable' and superintendent of the local fire brigade. By 1847, there were police in 'country centres', and the Melbourne force was composed of 'one chief officer, four sergeants, and 20 petty constables'. There was also 'a force of 28 mounted natives' enlisted and trained by DeVilliers and, later, Captain Pulteney Dana.

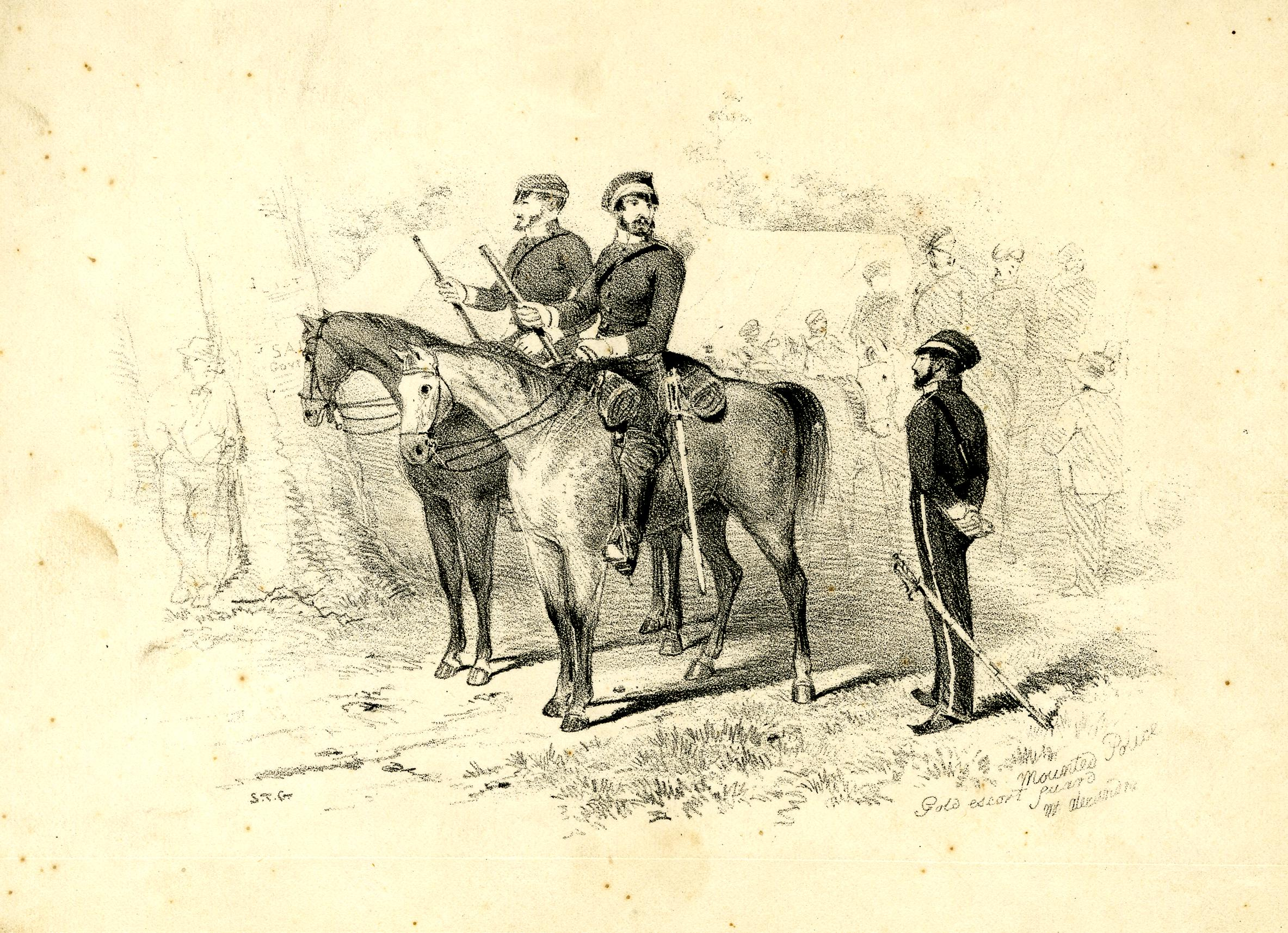
Mounted Police - Gold escort guard - Mt Alexander (1852) by "S.T.G." (S. T. Gill), from his "Sketches of the Victoria Gold Diggings and Diggers As They Are"

The Snodgrass Committee was established in early 1852 to "identify the policing needs of the colony", and, following the committee's report in September 1852, the Victoria Police was formally established on 8 January 1853 from an existing colonial police force of 875 men. Later that month, William Henry Fancourt Mitchell was 'gazetted as Chief Commissioner of Police for the Colony of Victoria'.

In 1853, Victoria Police was the first police organisation in Australia who merged all its police entities into one organisation under Victoria Police Chief Commissioner William Mitchell. Victoria continues to be the only state in Australia with a Chief Commissioner of Police.

Their first major engagement was the following year, 1854, in support of British soldiers during the events leading up to, and confrontation at, the Eureka Stockade where some miners (mostly Irish), police and soldiers were killed. From a report at the time: 'the troops and Police were under arms, and just at the first blush of dawn they marched upon the camp at Eureka'.

Mitchell resigned as Chief Commissioner, and Charles MacMahon was appointed acting chief commissioner that same year. After the formation of the Victorian Police, the first recorded death on duty was Edward Gray in 1853, followed by William Hogan in 1854, both of drowning.

The following couple of decades saw the growth of the police force, including the beginning of construction of the Russell Street police station in 1859.

Clockwise from top left: Constable Lonigan, Sergeant Kennedy, Constable McIntyre and Constable Scanlon.

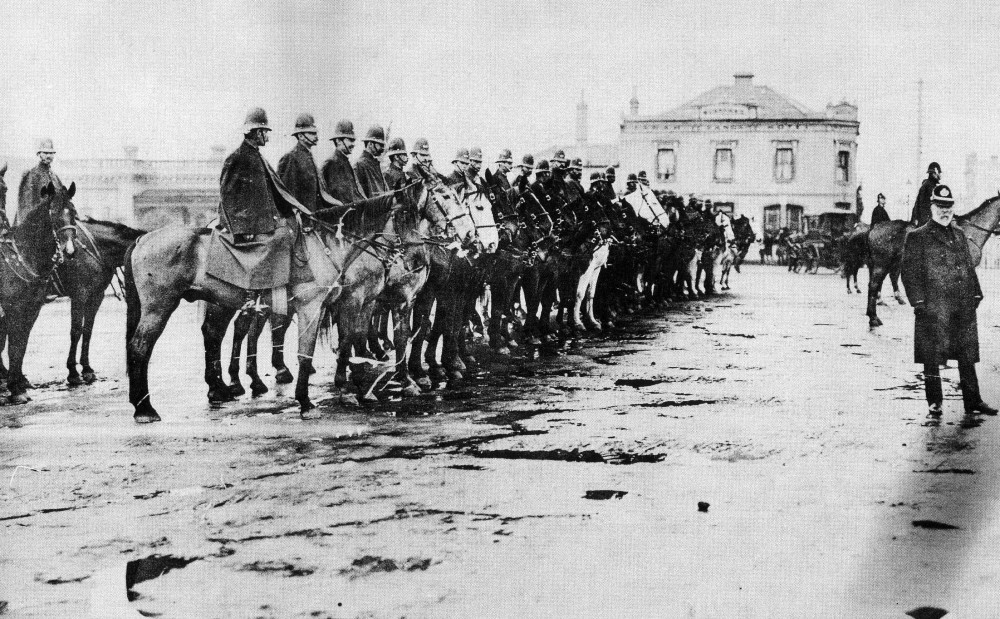
Mounted police outside the Sarah Sands Hotel in Brunswick awaiting a march by the unemployed in 1893.

Six years later, three more officers (Kennedy, Lonigan and Scanlan) who were hunting the Kelly Gang, were killed by them at Stringybark Creek. Two years later, in 1880, the police confronted the Kelly Gang at Glenrowan. A shoot-out ensued on 28 June, during which three members of the Kelly Gang were killed and following which Ned Kelly was shot and captured.

In 1888, senior constable John Barry produced the first Victoria Police Guide, a manual for officers. (The Victoria Police Manual, as it is now known, remains the comprehensive guide to procedure in the Victoria Police.) Police officers were granted the right to vote in parliamentary elections the same year.

In 1899, the force introduced the Victoria Police Valour Award to recognise the bravery of members. Three years later, in 1902, the right to a police pension was revoked.

In October 1917, Victoria Police appointed Madge Connor as a 'police agent'—while not a full sworn officer, Connor was the first woman to be made a member of a police service in Victoria, and was one of four women to be sworn in as officers in 1924, after she led a successful campaign for equal pay and status within the force.

=== 1923 Victoria Police strike ===
On 31 October 1923, members of the Victoria Police Force refused duty and went on strike over the introduction of a new supervisory system. The police strike led to riots and looting in Melbourne's central business district. The Victorian government enlisted special constables, and the Commonwealth of Australia called out the Australian military. Victoria Police are the only Australian police service to ever go on strike.

Only a few of the strikers were ever employed as policemen again, but the government increased pay and conditions for police as a result. Members of the Victoria Police (as its officers are generally known) now have among the highest union membership rates of any occupation, at well over 90%.

=== Recent history ===
In the 1980s and 1990s allegations were made against most Australian police forces of corruption and graft, culminating in the establishment of several Royal Commissions and anti-corruption watchdogs. Inquiries have also been held into Victoria Police (Beach et al.). The force was criticised because members of the public (both innocent and guilty) were being fatally shot at a rate exceeding that of all other Australian police forces combined. Related criticisms emerged after the 2008 killing of Tyler Cassidy by Victoria Police officers, which was partly blamed on inadequate training. In later years, numerous edits were made to the Wikipedia article about the killing from police computers, in an attempt to give a more favourable impression of the officers' conduct and the subsequent investigation.

In 2001, Christine Nixon was appointed Chief Commissioner, becoming the first woman to head a police force in Australia.

In May 2004 former police officer Simon Illingworth appeared on ABC-TV's Australian Story documentary program to tell his disturbing story of entrenched police corruption in Victoria Police. He has also written a book about his experiences entitled Filthy Rat.

In early 2007, Don Stewart, a retired Supreme Court judge, called for a royal commission into Victorian police corruption. Stewart alleged that the force was riddled with corruption that the Office of Police Integrity was unable to deal with.

On 2 March 2009, Simon Overland was named as the new chief commissioner, replacing Christine Nixon, who was retiring. In June 2011, Overland announced his decision to resign prematurely with effect from 1 July 2011 over what many assume were the allegations of corruption, the ombudsman criticism and the government pressure.

In November 2011, then acting chief commissioner Ken Lay was named as chief commissioner after five months' caretaking.

On 21 October 2011, the police force evicted Occupy Melbourne protesters from Melbourne City Square. Despite 173 arrests being made, no charges were laid against any protesters.

On 29 December 2014, Lay announced he was stepping down as the chief commissioner of Victoria Police after three years of service, taking leave until his resignation took effect on 31 January 2015. Deputy chief commissioner Tim Cartwright was acting in the role until a new commissioner was appointed. On 25 May 2015, Deputy Commissioner Graham Ashton of the Australian Federal Police was announced as the new chief commissioner—he took up the role in July 2015.

In April 2016, the treasurer announced an investment of $586 million into Victoria Police. From this investment, $540 million was used to employ 406 additional sworn police officers and 52 additional specialist staff, technology upgrades, and an expanded forensic capability of Victoria Police; $36.8 million to replace and refurbish a number of police stations in regional and rural areas; $19.4 million to continue the Community Crime Prevention Program; $63 million to enhance counter-terrorism capability, including an additional 40 sworn police officers; and 48 additional specialist staff to investigate and respond to an increased terror threat. The budget also funds a package of initiatives for all Victoria Police employees to help deal with mental health problems.

In 2015, Victoria Police employed The Victorian Equal Opportunity and Human Rights Commission (VEOHRC) to examine the nature and prevalence of sex discrimination, including predatory behaviour, amongst Victoria Police personnel. Kate Jenkins was appointed the Commissioner and, in mid December 2015, VEOHRC revealed its findings. Shortly after, on 9 December 2015, Victoria Police Chief Commissioner Ashton apologised over the high tolerance and prevalence of sexual harassment and the sexual discrimination and gender inequality within Victoria Police. Ashton pledged a change of direction and the implementation of all 20 recommendations by VEOHRC.

In December 2016, Police Minister Lisa Neville announced the recruitment of 2,735 new Victoria Police officers, the largest in the organisation's history as part of Victoria's first Community Safety Statement.

In September 2017, Transport Accident Commission (TAC) notified Victoria Police of "anomalies" in the preliminary breath tests statistics data. TAC and Victoria Police analysed more than 17.1m tests starting February 2012 and found that 258,463, or less than 1.5% tests were probably false. As a result, in mid 2018, TAC froze $4m funding to Victoria Police operations. Victoria Police also started an internal investigation into the matter, notified IBAC and appointed former chief commissioner Neil Comrie to conduct an investigation into the causes. A preliminary report suggested that unrealistic management demands of between 50 and 100 breath tests per shift was a possible cause to faking the tests. The methods used by police officers was that of placing a finger over the straw entry hole of breath testing equipment or blowing into the straw themselves.

In December 2018, Premier Daniel Andrews announced the Royal Commission into the Management of Police Informants to examine the actions of Victoria Police in their handling of Nicola Gobbo who informed on her clients whilst working as a barrister. The commission was established following the High Court delivering their decision in AB v CD; EF v CD in November 2018 in which they found Victoria Police to be "guilty of reprehensible conduct".

== Uniform ==
Between 1853 and 1877, when the first Victoria Police officers emerged, the uniforms resembled the military style of the day. Mounted and foot officers wore dark blue jackets buttoned to the neck. Mounted troops wore swords whilst the Gold Escorts carried revolvers and rifles. The foot patrols, as equipment, had wooden batons, notebooks, handcuffs and a whistle to call for assistance when in need. The whistles were fixed to the officer tunic by chain which prevented losing the whistle or falling during a foot chase,

In 1877 and until 1947, Victoria Police's uniform resembled British Metropolitan Police's uniform. In 1920, the Wolseley leather "bobby" helmet was also introduced. Policeman were wearing striped pieces of cloth (brassards) on their lower left cuffs to show they were on duty. During World War II, Victoria Police issued anti-shrapnel steel helmets, also referred as "tin hats".

Between 1947 and 1979, a major uniform change took place for Victorian Police officers. The bobby helmet was replaced by a black cloth peak cap, a silver police badge was introduced along with white shirts and ties for the general police officers. In 1963, a white pith helmet with a puggaree hatband and a hand-held radio were added to the Victoria Police general duties officers. Along with a new uniform, Victoria Police also introduced the first uniform for women. The uniform for females featured a knee-length skirt, a button-up jacket, a shirt and tie, tights, and peak hats made to fit a lady's hairstyle. Starting with 1972 until 1986, female police officers also carried handbags custom-made to hold batons and firearms.

Between 1979 and 2013, police uniforms underwent a number of iterative changes, and there were a total of 83 combinations that a police officer could wear. The changes were mainly as needed based for the general duties policing, with the addition of capsicum sprays, handgun, baton, etc. In 1981, female police officers were approved trousers as part of their uniform and they were issued 54 pantyhose a year. In 2001, the baseball cap was introduced along with akubra and a woollen jumper. One major change happened in 2010 with the introduction of the Integrated Operational Equipment Vest (IOEV).

In November 1986, Victoria Police announced the transition of the motto from "Tenez le droit" to "Uphold the right". This change would start taking place in December 1986.

In June 2013, the new dark navy uniform was introduced to all officers as the new standard. The pants are made from rip-stop fabric, while the undergarment is made from cotton stretch, which can be short-sleeved or long-sleeved and is to be worn under the ballistic vest. Baseball caps remained, although they are darker in colour than pre-2013. The new dark uniform was designed to look more professional and to hide blood, dirt and sweat. The dark blue uniform was modelled after the Oxfordshire and Northumberland police attires.

== Ranks and Insignia ==
Victoria Police has a quasi-military rank structure. The modern policing model developed by Sir Robert Peel for the Metropolitan Police in the United Kingdom in the early 19th century used a military-like organisational structure. Victoria Police has 12 legislated ranks from Constable through to Chief Commissioner with two of the twelve ranks now obsolete. There are also two classifications received through progression First Constable and Leading Senior Constable. In 2002, Victoria Police created the classification of Leading Senior Constable and in December 2011 created the classification of First Constable for confirmed constables both with its own insignia. Reservist is also a rank for former Victoria Police officers who re-join Victoria Police for a non-operational role carrying out administrative duties.

Constable and non-commissioned ranks
Rank	Constable	First constable	Senior; Constable	Leading senior constable	Sergeant	Senior sergeant
Insignia		Rank epaulette of a first constable of the Victoria Police.				

Rank	Reservist
Insignia	

Commissioned ranks
Rank	Inspector	Superintendent	Commander	Assistant commissioner	Deputy commissioner	Chief commissioner
Insignia						

Obsolete ranks

Rank	Chief; Inspector	Chief superintendent
Insignia		

The ranks of chief inspector and chief superintendent are no longer promotable ranks since the changes in hierarchy in 2014. The previous and last chief superintendent, Peter McDonald, retired from Victoria Police on 30 September 2014. The last Chief Inspector Christopher K. Coster retired on 6 June 2019 after 45 years service. He was the only Chief Inspector to wear the current style and colour uniform.

== Working conditions ==
Police officer salaries under the 2025 Enterprise Agreement are:

Rank	Increment	1 June 2025
Commander	1–4	$224,022–$238,046
Superintendent	1–8	$187,216–$219,629
Inspector	1–6	$165,674–$183,956
Senior sergeant	1–6	$151,069–$160,110
Sergeant	1–6	$133,798–$145,008
Leading Senior Constable	13–16	$116,636–$122,337
Senior Constable	5–12	$99,658–$115,480
First Constable	3–4	$87,766–$90,842
Constable	1–2	$81,612–$84,688
Recruit	1	$59,405
Reservist	1	$83,678

Protective Services Officer salaries under the 2025 Enterprise Agreement are:

Rank	Increment	1 June 2025
PSO Senior Sergeant	1–6	$110,889–$117,139
PSO Sergeant	1–6	$102,495–$108,771
PSO Senior	5–10	$81,262–$92,267
PSO 1st Class	3–4	$78,779–$80,358
PSO	1–2	$75,251–$77,237

The ordinary hours of work for full-time police officers is 80 hours per fortnight arranged within various shifts to suit service delivery needs.

There are a number of other penalties that a police officer benefits, including civilian clothing, camping out, uniform allowance, daily meals or attendance to court, courses, trips away from home, etc. Other allowances include leadership allowance for Sergeants and Senior Sergeants, capability allowance for Constable - Senior Constable and PSO's.

Police officers are entitled to the following:

- nine weeks' leave consisting of:
  - five weeks' recreation leave per year
  - additional two weeks in lieu of public holidays
  - and 10 days accrued time off in lieu of the 38-hour week
- Sick leave of 15 days per year. (accruing)
- A range of other generous leave entitlements; including maternity and paternity leave, study leave and defence force leave.
- Long service leave after seven and a half years of service

Recruits are paid a salary whilst training. During the first 12 weeks, recruits are paid $61,187 per annum. At the end of week 12 when a recruit becomes a (constable) sworn officer of Victoria Police is paid $84,060 per annum. Part-time is not available for recruits. Training is ongoing for first two years as a probationary constable. Study leave is available post probationary stage. Further in-house courses and training are available

=== Progression and promotion ===
All sworn officers start at the lowest rank of constable and are able to progress and be promoted to higher ranks. After their 2-year probationary period, the Constable receives their confirmation and becomes a permanent officer of Victoria Police as a First Constable.

Constables are promoted in situ to senior constable after two years of becoming a confirmed Constable and successful completion of re-introduced Senior Constable exams. Promotion beyond senior constable is highly competitive. The newly promoted officer is in probation for 1 year.

Leading senior constable is awarded "in situ" but only after assessments have been made against the senior constable's ability to move to the higher position. Leading senior constables are now capable of being upgraded to acting sergeant and it is expected that the position is one that people will move through as they are promoted.

Promotion to the rank of sergeant is based upon an application and interview process after a vacancy is made available due to transfer or retirement of a pre-existing sergeant. Senior constables must first successfully complete the Sergeant Level Pre-promotional Qualifying Exam. A sergeant normally manages a team during a shift, like Patrol Supervisor of a Police Service Area (PSA) for a shift. A detective sergeant is typically in charge of a team in a specific part of either local detectives at police stations or crime squads.

A senior sergeant oversees the sergeants and traditionally performs more administrative work and middle management duties, for example coordination of policing operations, or specialist work other than active patrol duties. General-duties senior sergeants are traditionally in charge of most police stations or can be a sub-charge (or second in charge) of larger (usually 24-hour) police stations. In each division, or group of divisions on a night shift, a senior sergeant is the division supervisor for a shift and is responsible for managing and overseeing incidents in their area. Detective senior sergeants are usually the officer in charge of crime investigation units.

=== Designations ===
Additional classifications are available for officers skilful enough, and upon completion of certain training and work-based performances, for classification of detective at senior constable level. Detectives also hold classification up to superintendent.

== Structure ==
Victoria Police divides the state into four geographic regions with each region allocated dedicated resources and each region is commanded by an Assistant Commissioner. The regions are:

- Eastern Region
- North West Metro Region
- Southern Metro Region
- Western Region

Victoria Police has the following departments and commands that service the whole of Victoria:

- Capability Department
- Counter Terrorism Command
- Crime Command
- Family Violence Command
- Financial Services Department
- Forensic Services Department
- Gender Equality & Inclusion Command
- Governance and Assurance Department
- Human Resource Department
- Information Systems & Security Command
- Intelligence & Covert Support Command
- Investment Management & Reporting Department
- Legal Services Department
- Media & Corporate Communications Department
- Operational Infrastructure Department
- People Development Command
- Police Enquiry & Data Sharing Department
- Professional Standards Command
- Regulatory Services Department
- Road Policing Command
- State Emergencies & Support Command
- Transit & Public Safety Command

== Protective Services Unit ==
PSO tartan colours used on uniforms

The Protective Services Unit (PSU) was established in 1986 following a security review. The first deployment of a Protective Services Officer (PSO) was on 1 May 1988. The PSU has two divisions: Security and Transit. The PSU is part of Transit and Public Safety Command (TPSC).

=== PSO Security ===
The PSO security division maintains static security at designated locations in the Melbourne metropolitan area. PSOs have specific powers for the area they serve.

Designated areas include:

- Melbourne's Supreme Court, County Court, Children's Court and Magistrates' Court
- Various suburban magistrates' courts
- Victoria Civil and Administrative Tribunal
- Department of Premier and Cabinet
- Department of Justice and Community Safety
- Parliament House Victoria
- Government House
- The Shrine of Remembrance
- Victoria Police Centre
- Spencer Street Police Complex

=== PSO Transit ===
Protective Services Officers are based at all railway stations on the Melbourne rail network in metropolitan Melbourne. PSOs are also based at four regional stations: Geelong, Ballarat, Traralgon and Bendigo. PSOs conduct static patrols of railway stations from 6pm until the last train. In February 2012, Flinders Street and Southern Cross railway stations became the first stations to be patrolled by PSOs after the PSOs completed a 12-week training course. The roll out of PSOs to all 215 railway stations was completed in June 2016. PSOs focus mostly on anti-social behaviour, alcohol and drug related offences, weapon offences, property damage, and crimes against the person.

PSOs powers at railway stations include:

- arrest and detain people including for breaching parole
- search people and property – and seize items
- issue on-the-spot fines
- issue a direction to 'move on' from the area

In January 2018, a trial was conducted of mobile teams of PSOs patrolling trams stops for the Australian Open tennis tournament with the government providing funding for 100 mobile PSOs. In September 2018, mobile teams of PSOs began conducting patrols on trains in the Melbourne rail network. In January 2019, mobile teams of PSOs began conducting patrols on trams for the first time for the Australian Open.

During the COVID-19 response by Victoria Police, PSOs duties included hotel quarantine, interstate border checks and patrols of businesses in commercial retail precincts. To enable PSOs to perform COVID-19 duties, in April 2020, the areas where PSOs could operate were temporarily expanded to include all of the Melbourne metropolitan area and regional areas. In December 2020, the areas where PSOs could patrol were permanently expanded to enable PSOs to be deployed in emergencies. In April 2021, the areas where PSOs could patrol were further expanded with the Melbourne Grand Prix precinct in April 2022 the first designated place to be patrolled by PSOs.

=== Operation Pulse ===
During Operation Pulse, from December 2025 until February 2026, PSOs on their days off, as voluntary duties, will patrol several metropolitan shopping centres together with general duties officers.

== Police Custody Officers ==
Police Custody Officers (PCOs) are public servants responsible for managing people in custody at police stations with gaols, including supervising prisoners and escorting them to and from court, and guarding offenders in hospital. The roll out of 400 PCOs commenced in January 2016 and was completed in February 2018. PCOs are equipped with a baton, handcuffs, and oleoresin capsicum spray (OC spray). PCOs complete eight weeks of training including six weeks at the police academy.

== Reservists ==
In November 2025, the government announced that Chief Commissioner Mike Bush had requested funding to recruit up to 200 reservists to free up hundreds of frontline police officers. Training commenced for the first 25 reservists at the Victoria Police Academy on 20 July 2026 with reservists required to complete one week of training. Former police officers who have at least two years' experience either in Victoria or from interstate, New Zealand or the United Kingdom are eligible to apply for a reservist position. Reservists will not be equipped with operational safety equipment such as firearms. In late July and early August 2026, the first 50 reservists commenced duties at 26 police stations across the state.

== Honours and awards ==
Recognition of the bravery and good conduct of Victoria Police employees is shown through the awarding of honours and decorations. Employees (including both sworn and unsworn personnel) are eligible to receive awards both as a part of the Australian Honours System and the internal Victoria Police awards system.

=== Australian honours system ===
Victoria Police employees, like those of their counterparts in other states police forces, are eligible for awards under the Australian Honours System, including:

- Australian Bravery Decorations, namely the Cross of Valour (CV), Star of Courage (SC), Bravery Medal (BM) and the Commendation for Brave Conduct.
- Australian Police Medal – The Australian Police Medal (APM) recognises distinguished service by a sworn police employee and is awarded on Australia Day and King's Birthday each year;
- Police Overseas Service Medal – The Police Overseas Service Medal (POSM) recognises service by employees of Australian police forces with international peacekeeping organisations;
- Humanitarian Overseas Service Medal – The Humanitarian Overseas Service Medal (HOSM) honours members of recognised Australian groups that perform humanitarian service overseas in hazardous circumstances;
- National Medal – Available to sworn police employees only, the National Medal (NM) is awarded to specified categories of employees from recognised organisations for diligent service and good conduct over a sustained period. Issued for 15 years service with a clasp issued for each additional 10 years of eligible service;
- Public Service Medal – The Public Service Medal (PSM) is awarded for outstanding public service and is awarded on Australia Day and King's Birthday each year;
- Campaign medals such as United Nations Medal For Service, when seconded or attached to an appropriate United Nations position overseas.

=== Internal Victoria Police honours and awards ===
Victoria Police medal ribbon bars
Valour Award	Victoria Police Star	Medal for Excellence	Medal for Courage	Medal for Merit	Service Medal

- Victoria Police Valour Award – The Victoria Police Valour Award (VA) is awarded to sworn police employees for a particular incident involving an act that displayed exceptional bravery in extremely perilous circumstances;
- Victoria Police Star – The Victoria Police Star is an award for employees killed or seriously injured, on or off duty;
- Victoria Police Medal for Excellence – Awarded to an employee/s who has/have demonstrated a consistent commitment to exceeding the organisational goals and priorities of Victoria Police;
- Victoria Police Medal for Courage – Awarded to an employee/s who has/have performed an act of courage in fulfilment of their duties in dangerous and volatile operational circumstances;
- Victoria Police Medal for Merit – Awarded to an employee/s who has/have demonstrated exemplary service to Victoria Police and the Victorian community;
- Victoria Police Service Medal – The Victoria Police Service Medal (VPSM) is recognition by the chief commissioner of the sustained diligent and ethical service of Victoria Police employees. The medal issued for 10 years service with a clasp issued for each further period of five years' eligible service. Additionally the medal is available to former employees who left Victoria Police before the introduction of the VPSM on 26 February 1996;
- Victoria Police Thirty Five Years Service Award – The Thirty Five Years Service Award recognises employees who have an extensive and dedicated employment history with Victoria Police
- Victoria Police Unit or Group Citation for Courage or Merit – As per the Medal for Courage and/or Medal for Merit criteria;
- Victoria Police Department or Regional Commendation – A department or regional commendation provides recognition of exceptional performance or service;
- Victoria Police Divisional Commendation – A divisional commendation provides recognition of exceptional performance or exceptional service;
- Victoria Police Unit or Group Commendation – a unit or group commendation can be awarded at department, regional or divisional level.

== Equipment ==
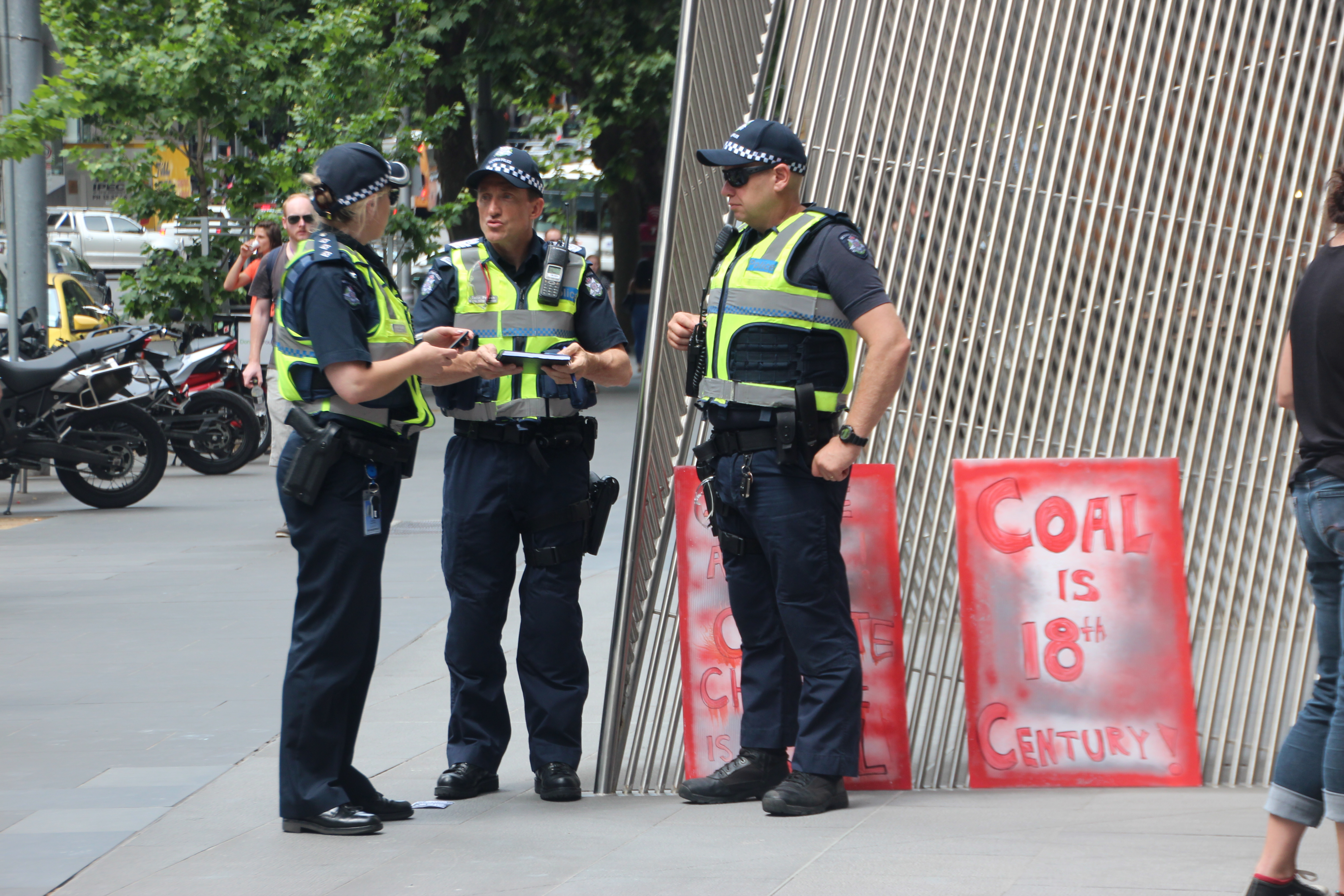
Victoria Police officers on duty

=== Operational and station/office dress ===
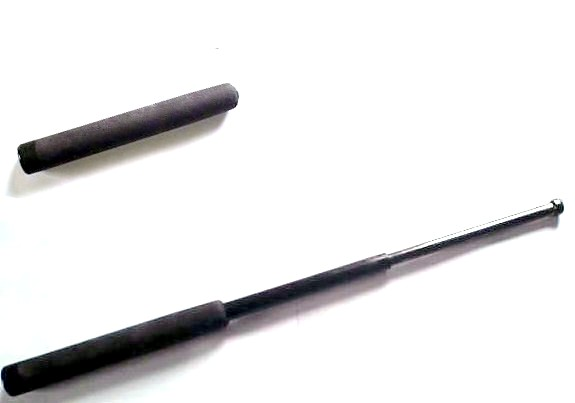
ASP 21' baton in expandable and collapsed state.

Equipment is carried by officers in a nylon equipment belt, also known as a gun or weapon belt. The nylon belt, specifically designed to be very light-weight, was first issued in 2003 as a replacement for worn leather belts. The belt consists of one firearm holster placed on the hip (either side), one firearm magazine pouch, one ASP (baton) pouch, one OC Spray pouch, one hand cuff pouch and one holder for the portable radio.

Victoria Police started a roll-out of a new uniform design in June 2013 for sworn members, protective service officers, reservists and recruits. The new uniform was the first time in over thirty years Victoria Police had significantly changed their uniform, which at the time of replacement could be worn in over eighty different combinations. The new design can be worn in either an operational or station/office dress configuration.

Other holsters can be added to the belt to suit members duties such as a clip to hold the polycarbonate baton or mag light. In 2007/08, the chief commissioner approved the issue of firearm holsters which could be strapped around the members thighs, to replace the low-riding belt gun holster. These holsters are not standard issue but are issued to members upon request, and are commonly requested by members who suffer from back aches (as a result of heavy utility belt), or those who find it more operationally sound to draw their firearms from a lower position (as this option offers a more comfortable reach).

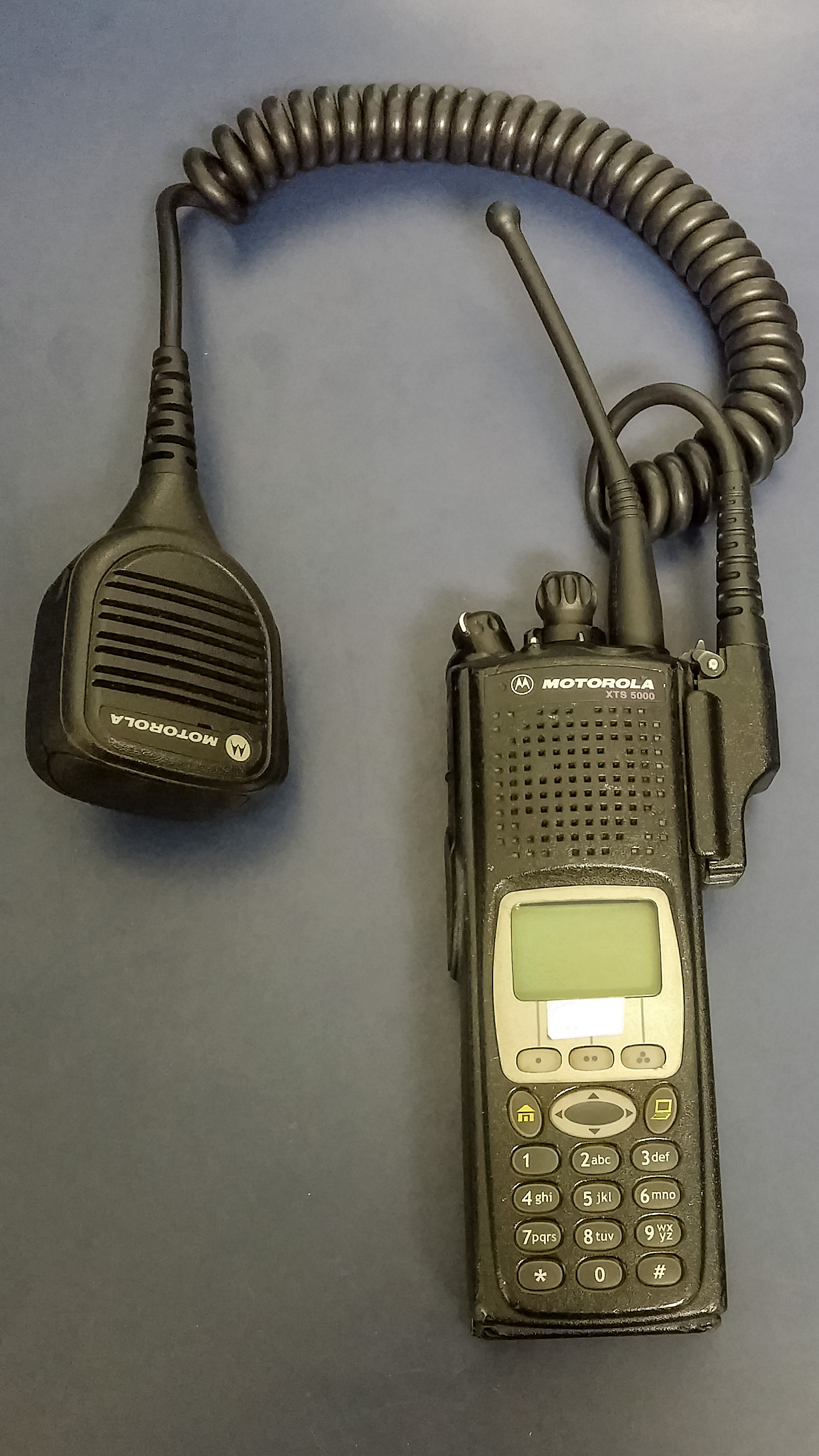
Motorola Radio model XTS 5000 used by Victoria Police

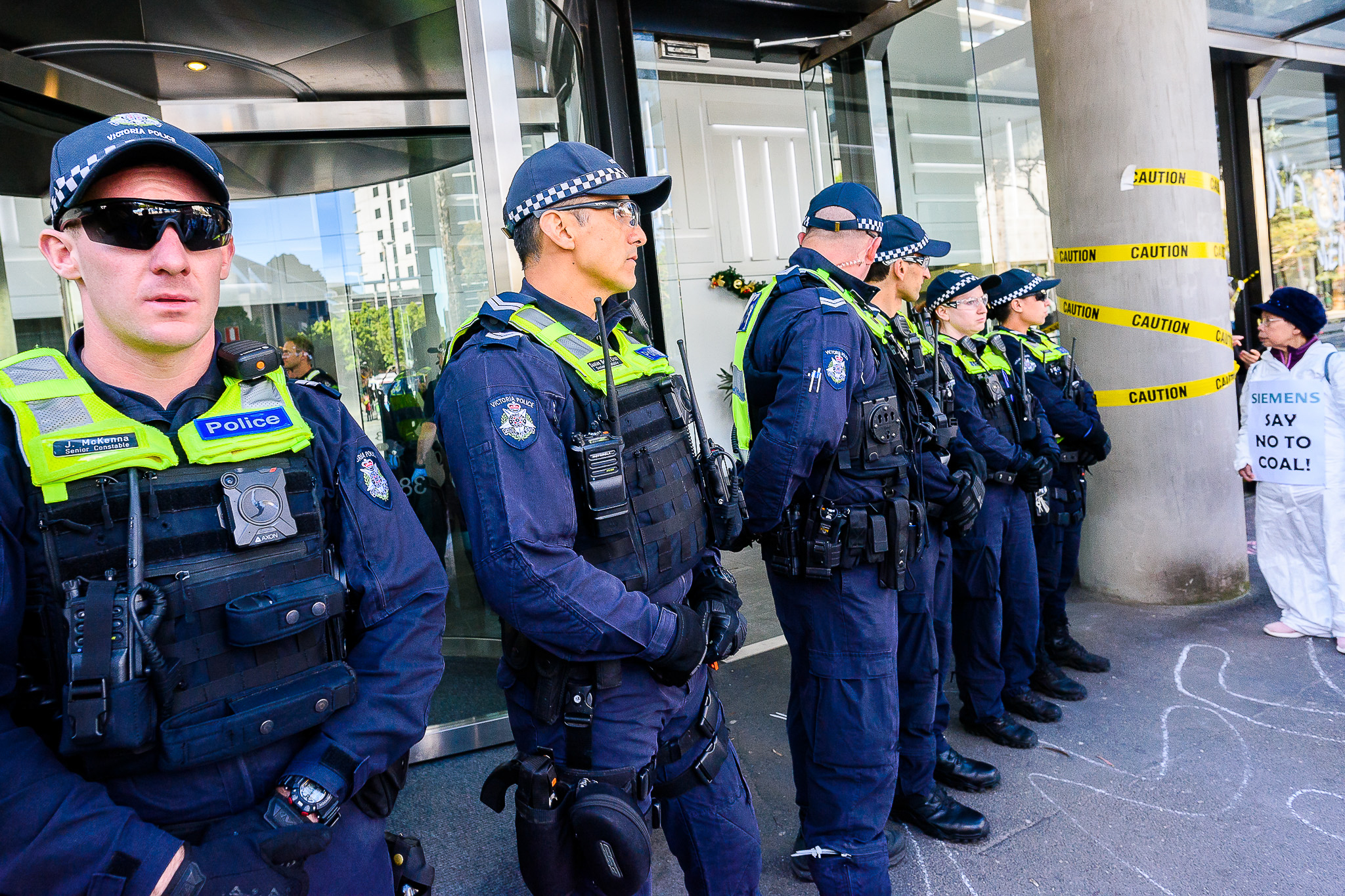
A line of officers at a protest

Operational Dress of Victoria Police consists of navy blue cargo/tactical pants, a navy blue long/short sleeved undergarment or shirt, a black ballistic equipment vest, a navy blue baseball cap or a wide Brimmed hat (common in rural areas) and black boots.

In 2018, the first body worn camera was issued.

In July 2019, a new lightweight black ballistic vest was issued to all officers to replace the navy Integrated Operational Equipment Vest (IOEV) that had been rolled out in 2010.

Station/office dress consists of navy blue trousers, navy blue long or short sleeved shirts (which can be worn either open-neck or with a tie), navy blue peaked hat and black boots/shoes.

Some specialist units of Victoria Police, such as the Air Wing, Public Order Response Team, Critical Incident Response Team, Search and Rescue Squad and the Special Operations Group, wear uniforms which are customised to their specialist roles.

=== Operational safety equipment ===
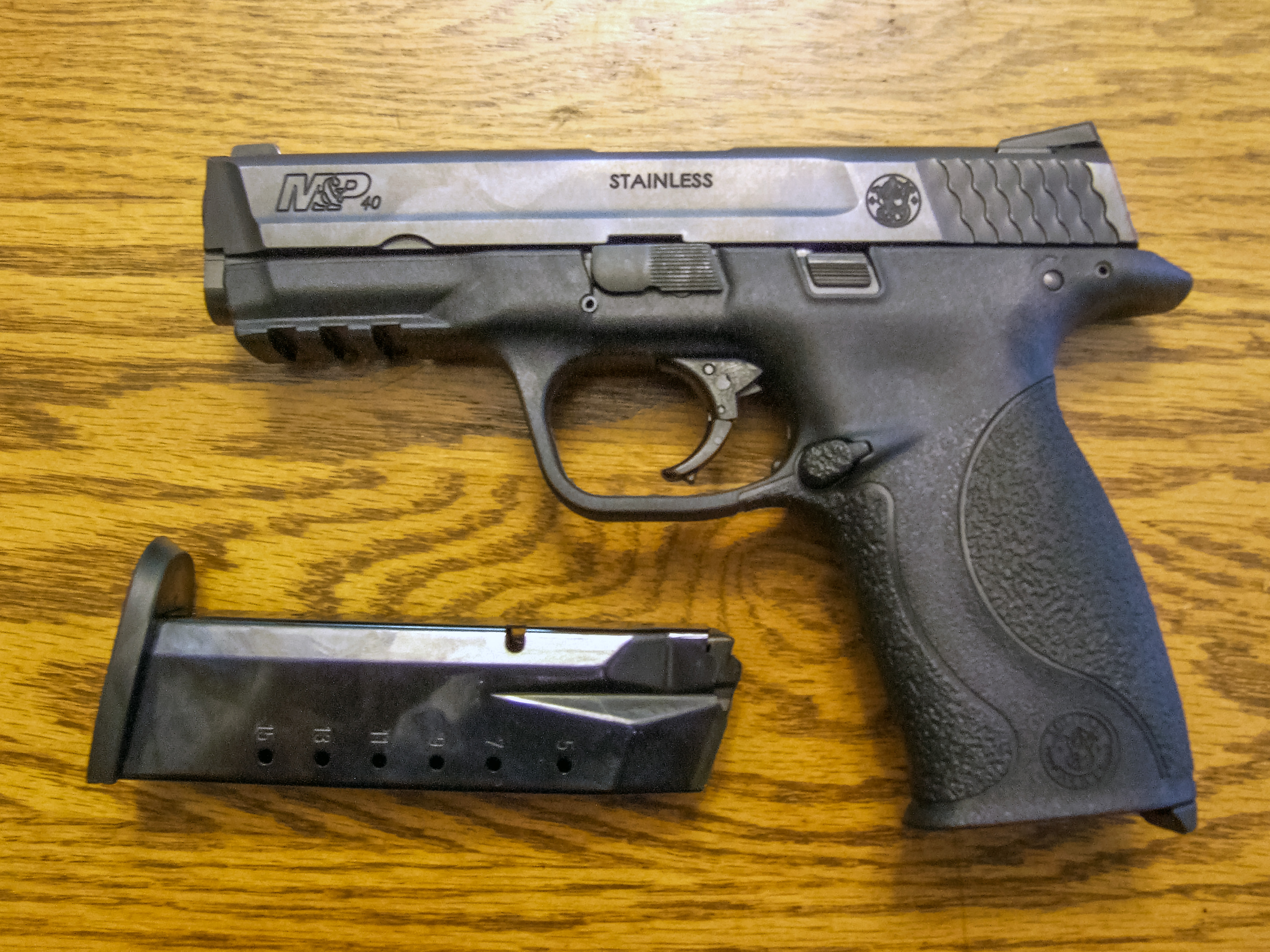
The Smith & Wesson M&P is the standard issue firearm of the Victoria Police

Officers are issued with the Smith & Wesson M&P semi-automatic pistol and also carry an ASP brand 21-inch expandable baton, Oleoresin Capsicum (OC) Spray, handcuffs and small torch. The vast majority of officers carry a Motorola brand portable radio (with or without handpiece) for use on either the Metropolitan Mobile Radio (MMR) or Regional Mobile Radio (RMR) network, utilizing a Motorola APX8000 radio.

In the 1970s, officers were trained to use the FN Model 1910 .32 semi-automatic pistol which they could carry concealed in their tunic. In 1979, Victoria Police began replacing the Model 1910 with the Smith & Wesson Model 10 revolver. By the mid-1980s, all officers were routinely openly carrying a revolver.

In the mid-2000s, Victoria Police was set to become the last police service in Australia still using a revolver. Chief Commissioner Christine Nixon was reluctant to transition to a modern semi-automatic pistol. The Bracks Labor government was convinced by the police association and made an election policy for the 2006 Victorian state election to allocate $10 million in funding which would also cover equipping all police cars with tasers.

Nixon was placed in a precarious position as police operational decisions including equipment are made independent of government. In September 2007, months after the Bracks government had been re-elected, Nixon set up an Independent Expert Advisory Panel to advise her if the revolver needed replacing. In March 2008, the panel recommended to replace the revolver with a self-loading pistol. In May 2008, a police officer was shot in the leg during a violent shootout in which he had to re-load his revolver. The police association erroneously informed the media the officer had been shot whilst re-loading and called for semi-automatic pistols.

On 6 June 2008, Nixon announced that Victoria Police would upgrade to semi-automatic pistols and would not be equipping officers with tasers. On 29 April 2010, Victoria Police announced that the M&P40 semi-automatic pistol with a tactical light had been selected to replace the revolver. The roll-out of the new personal issue firearm commenced in November 2010 with all officers required to complete a four-day training course over 18 months.

On 19 December 2019, Victoria Police announced the purchase of 300 Daniel Defense DDM4V7S semi-automatic rifles. The rifles will be issued to the Public Order Response Team (PORT) and four 24-hour regional uniform stations – Geelong, Ballarat, Morwell and Shepparton to be securely stored in vehicles. Over 700 Victoria Police officers are to be trained in the use of the rifles to be able to respond to critical incidents. The roll-out of the rifles will commence in June 2020 and will be completed by the end of 2021. In June 2026, Chief Commissioner Mike Bush announced that Wodonga and Wangaratta would also receive rifles. The Special Operations Group (SOG) and the Critical Incident Response Team (CIRT) are both issued with the SIG MCX SBR rifle and a variety of shotguns.

From 2023, Victoria Police will begin rolling out the Axon Taser 7 model to all police officers and PSOs including in metropolitan areas. In 2017, Victoria Police completed a roll out of an earlier taser model to thirty-seven 24-hour regional stations. Tasers were first trialled in regional stations over three years from 2010 to 2013. The SOG trialled tasers for twelve months from 2003 to 2004.

=== Fleet ===
Victoria Police's fleet comprises a wide range of different vehicles including Mercedes, Volkswagen, Hyundai, BMW, and Tesla. In 2018/19 Victoria Police introduced a revamp to their highway patrol fleet, which previously contained mainly Holden VFs. Victoria Police's general duties fleet now mainly uses SUVs including the new Volkswagen Tiguan, Kia Sorento, Hyundai Santa Fe and Toyota Kluger (in some markets called, Toyota Highlander) along with Hyundai Palisade. They also use 4WDs in rural areas Toyota LandCruiser Prado and Mitsubishi Pajero.

VICPOL's main frontline response vehicle is their divisional 'divvy' van based on the Ford Ranger that replaced the Holden Colorado from 2021. The Ford Ranger includes numerous new safety features including CCTV cameras all over the van. The Holden Colorado two door 4x2 'divvy' van replaced the Holden Commodore ute based 'divvy' van in 2018 and featured air conditioning and a 360-degree-view camera in the prisoner pod. A small number of the Colorado 'divvy' vans located in country areas were four door 4x4 and were equipped with a bull bar and winch. VICPOL will now be replacing the divvy every three years. In 2023, the latest generation Ford Ranger 'divvy' van was unveiled which will all be fitted a steel bull bar previously only fitted to country and urban fringe located vans. Most VICPOL stations across the state have at least one divisional van including other general duties and specialist vehicles.

In March 2014, the Water Police purchased a new catamaran vessel. The A$1.9 million, 14.9-metre-long boat will assist in the search for people stranded at sea or washed overboard and during periods of total darkness, poor light and rough seas. The vessel has the ability to scan the seabed for sunken vessels, and a radar can be switched into heat seeking mode to help locate a person at night, or in situations of poor visibility and rough conditions.

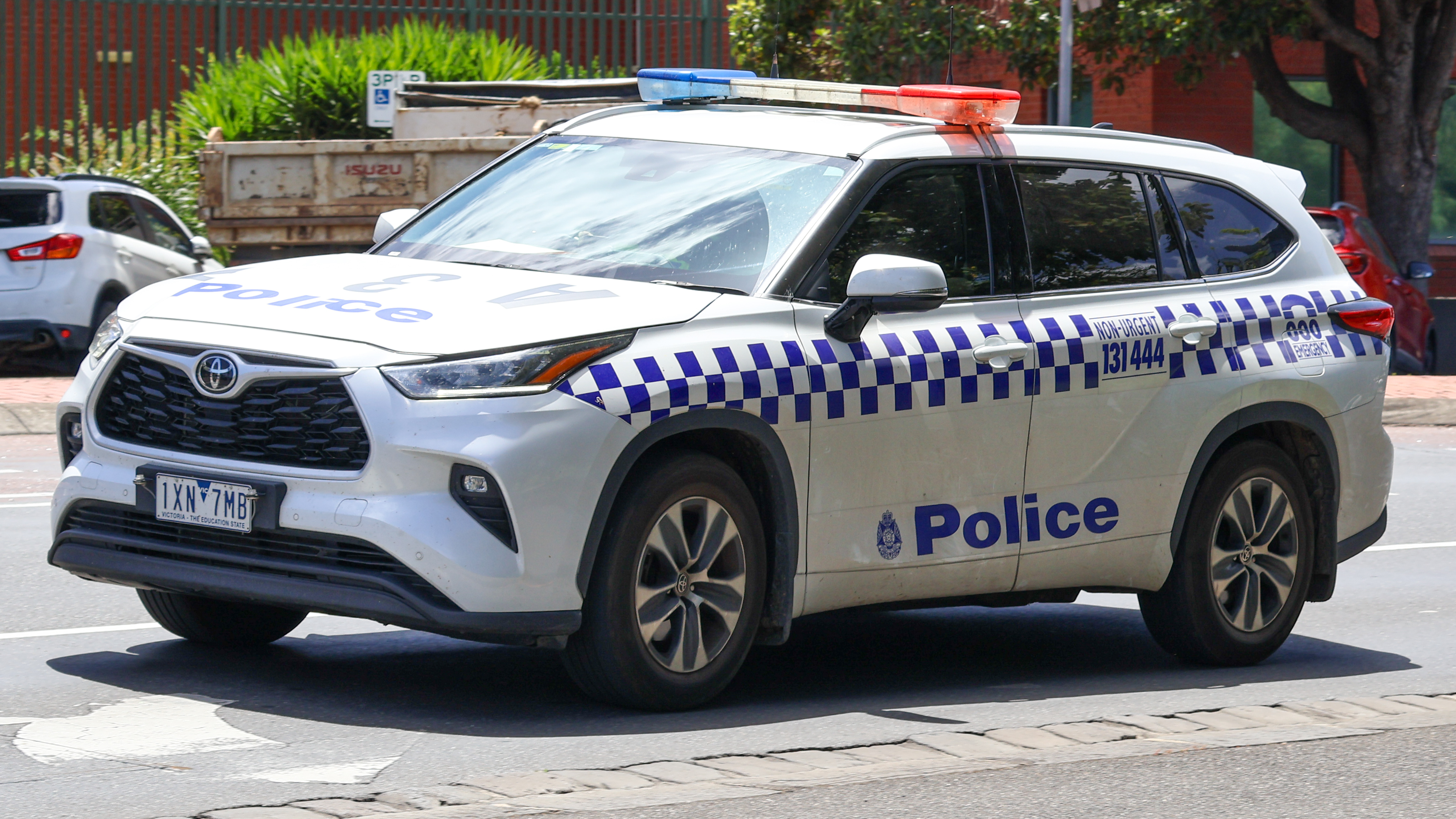
Toyota Kluger General Duties

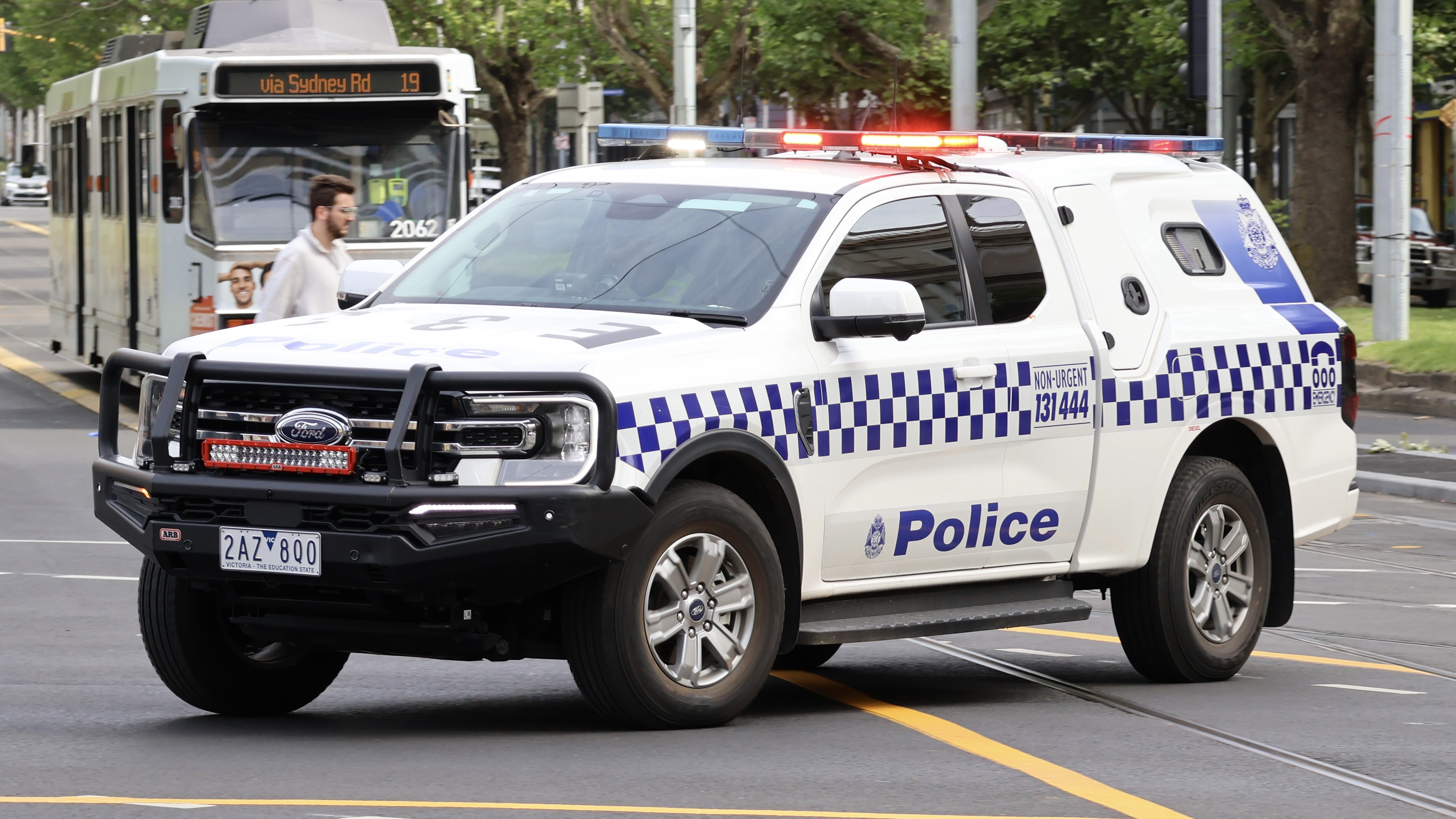
Ford Ranger Divisional Van

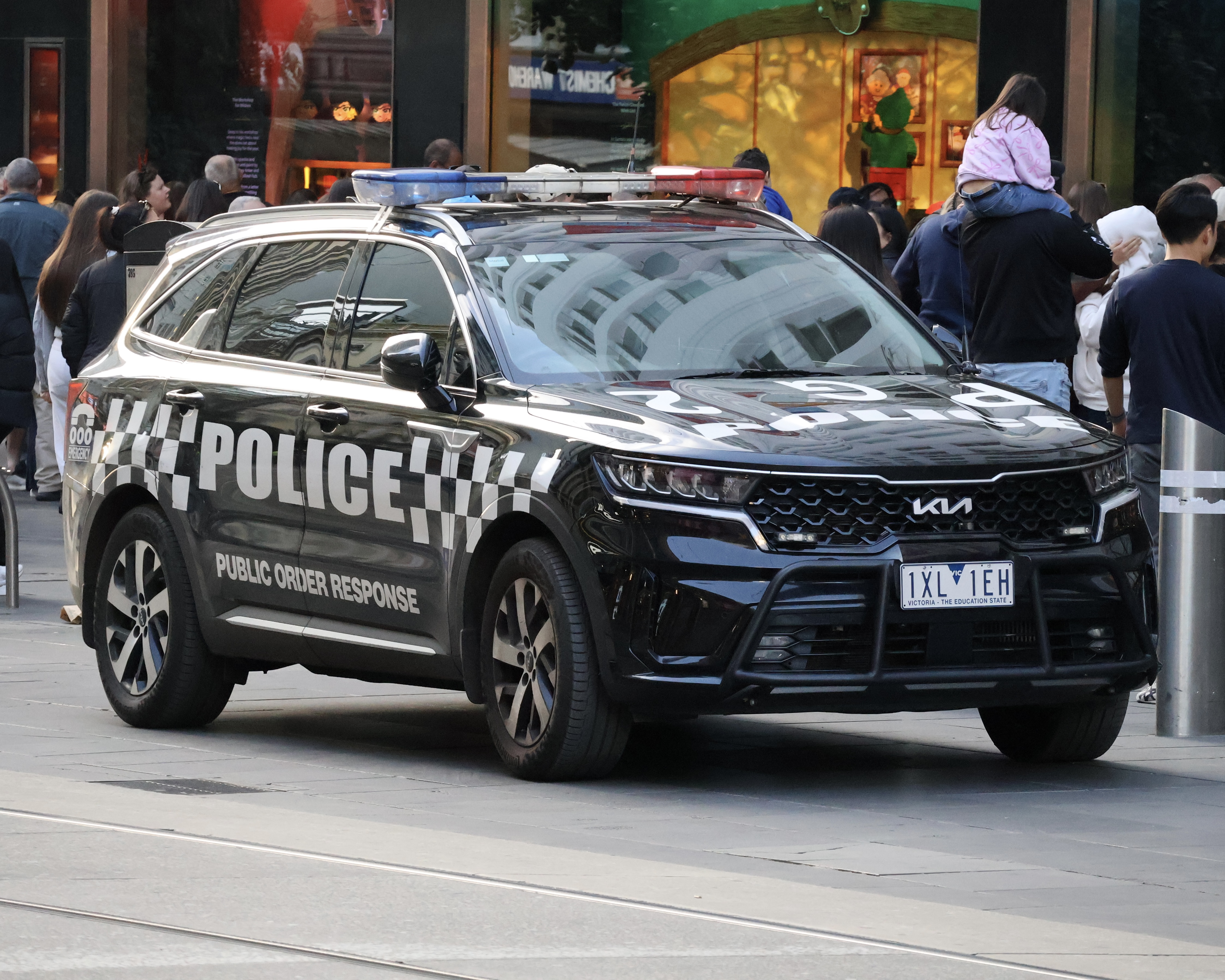
Kia Sorento public order response

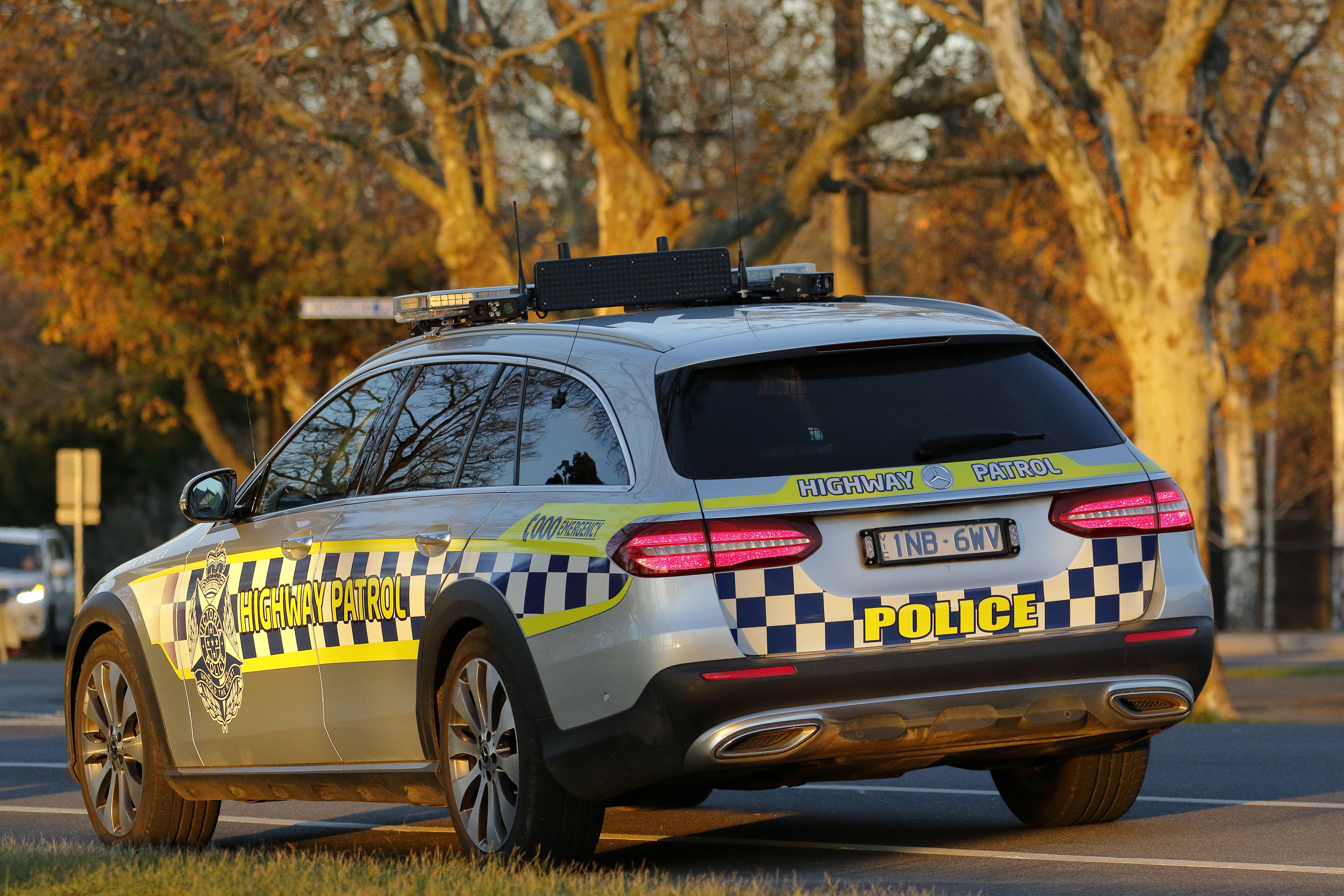
Pictured a Mercedes-Benz E-Class (W213) (400D engine) in June, 2020

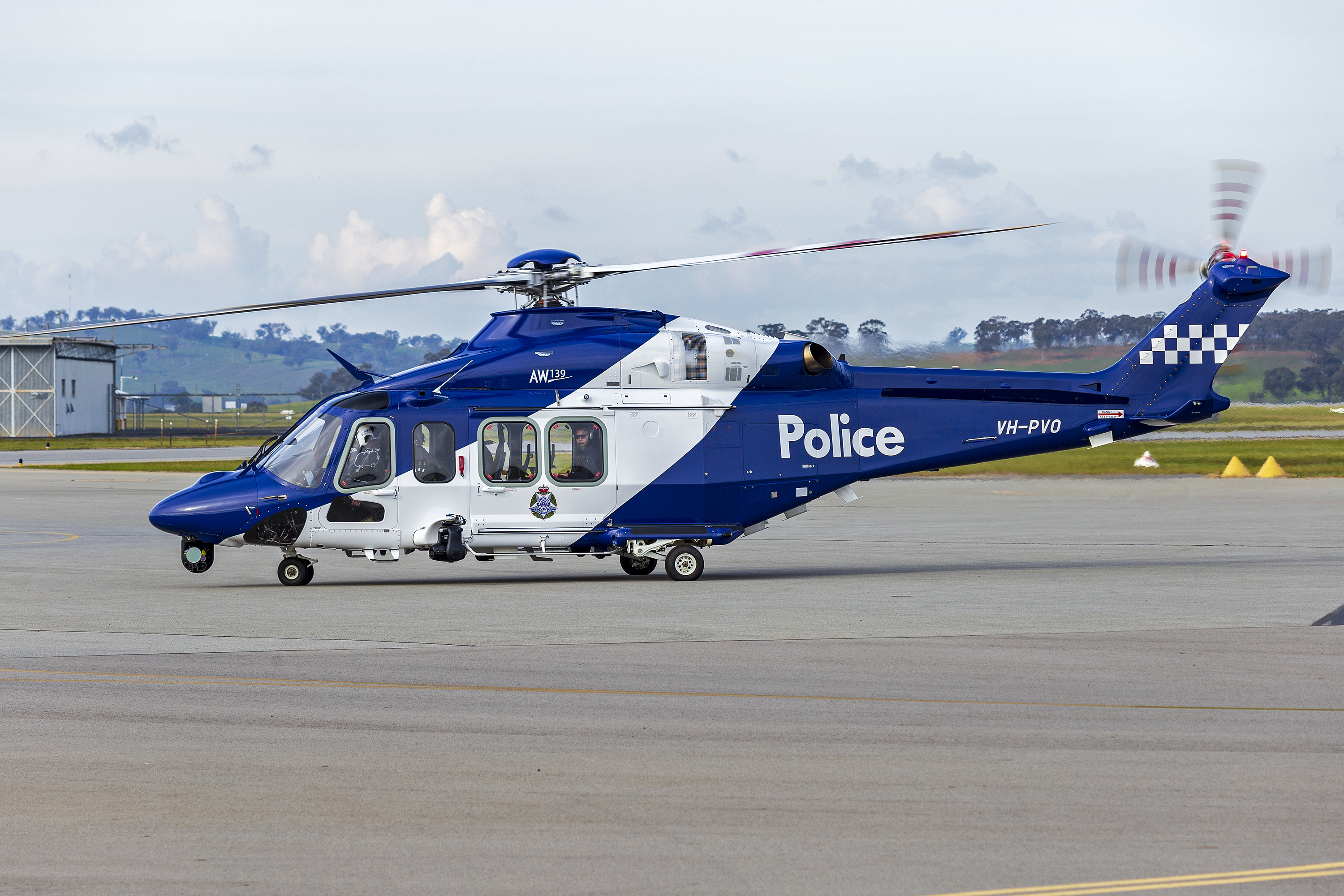
Pictured a AgustaWestland AW139 in June, 2020

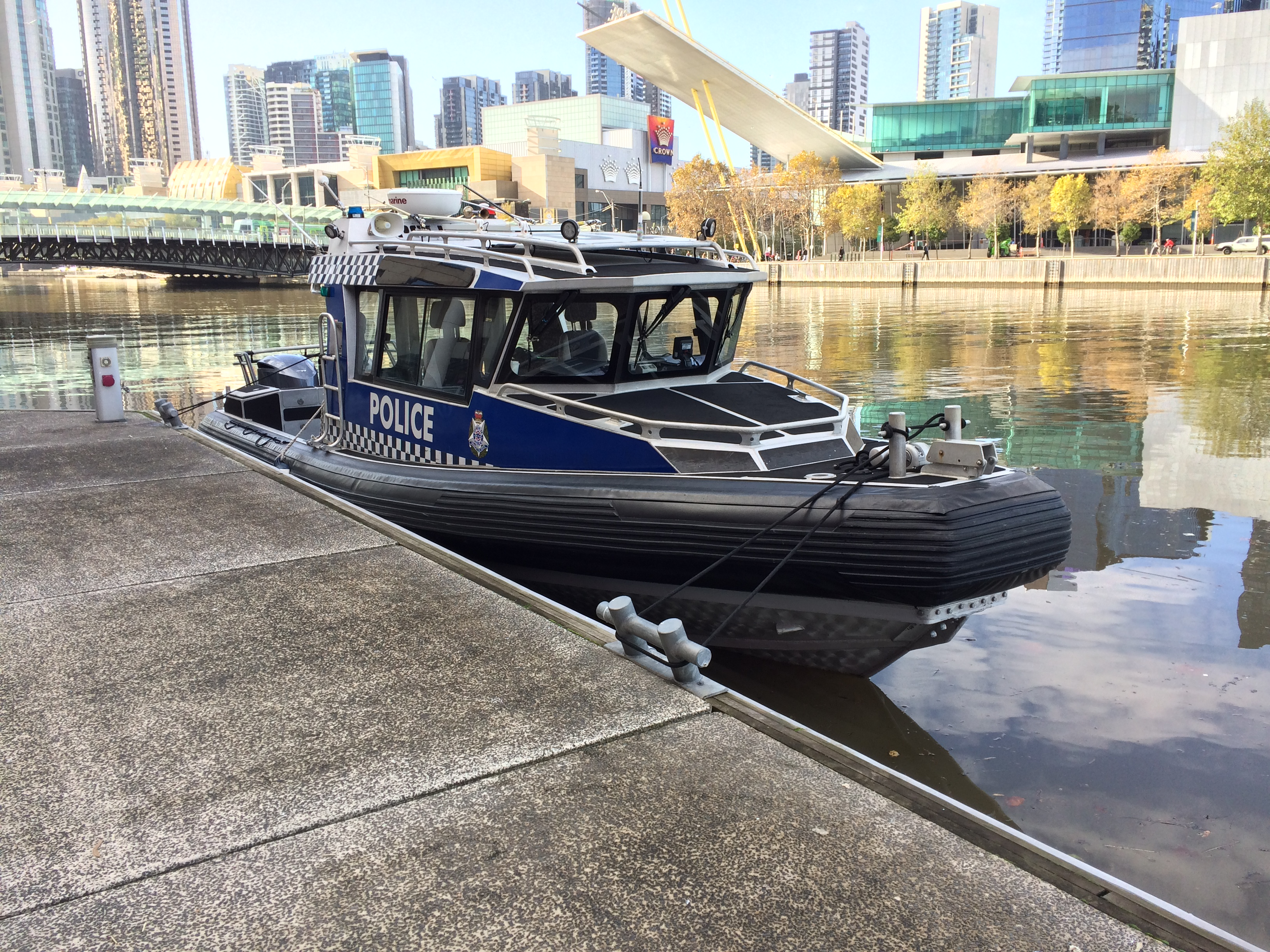
Police boat in May, 2017

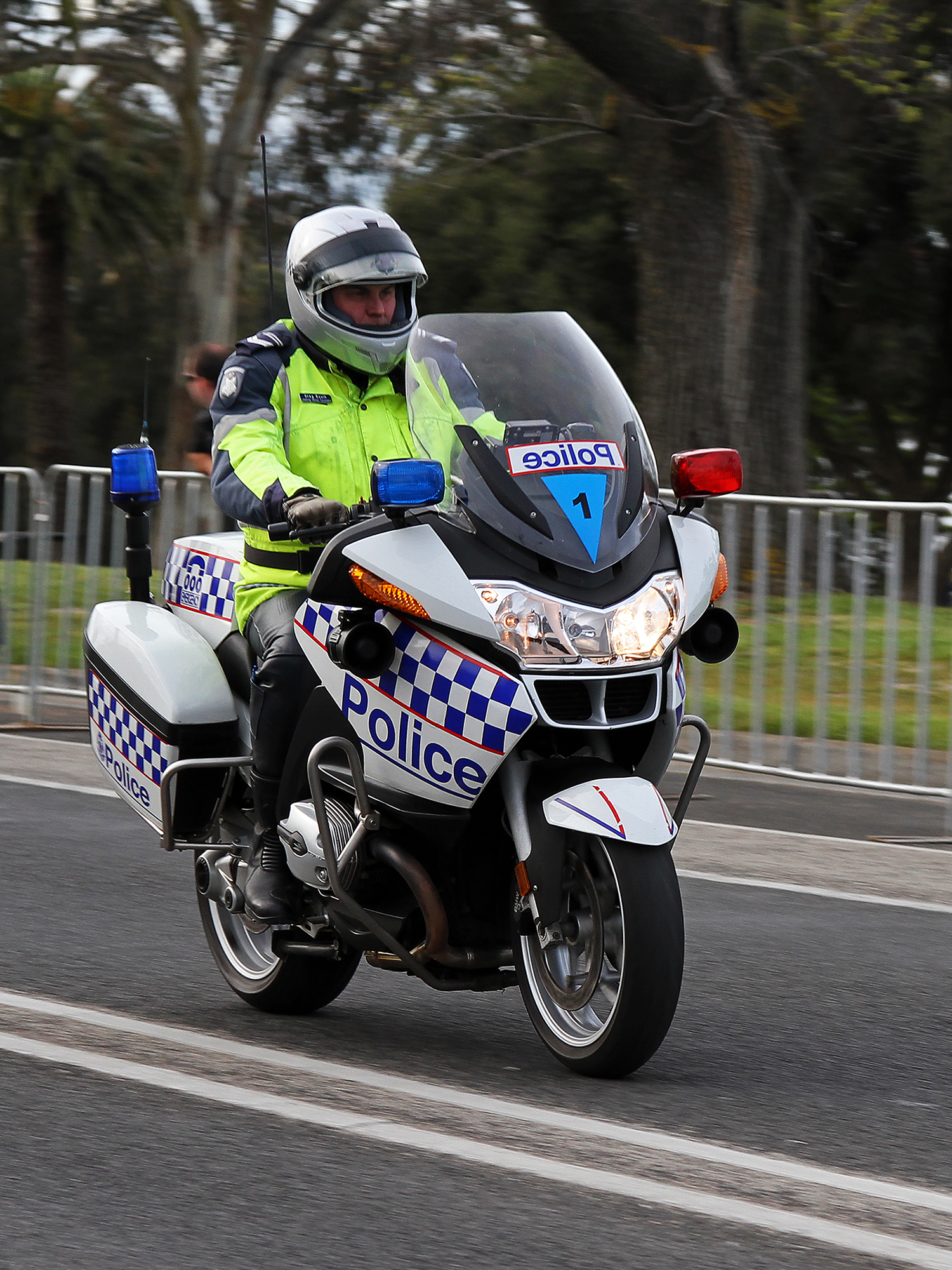
Pictured a BMW R1200RT-P in September, 2010

=== Training facilities ===
The main training for Victoria Police during the first 25 weeks, until a member becomes fully operational, is done at Victoria Police Academy. Commencing from July 2025, the length of the academy training will be reduced from 31 weeks to 25 weeks. The new program according to Victoria Police best prepares officers for the realities of the job and is more practical and interactive.

==== Academy ====
In July 2014, a A$18 million upgrade of the Academy's operational training and safety tactics (OTST) facilities was officially opened.

The significant works include:

- a new firing range, a 'soft fall' area for conducted energy device and defensive tactics training, and a simulator, which will be used for firearm and operational safety training, using bluetooth technology
- a new training system, called Hydra, which simulates a variety of operational scenarios, ranging from vehicle intercepts to large-scale criminal investigations and emergencies, such as bushfires
- a railway platform for PSO training and new classrooms for training

In January 2027, a new regional police academy based in Mildura will begin training recruits who will receive the same 25-week program as delivered at the Victoria Police Academy in Glen Waverley. In July 2026, the government announced that a Gippsland based regional police academy would be established. The Gippsland regional police academy is expected to open in late 2027 or early 2028.

==== Craigieburn OTST facility ====
In 2015, a A$30 million purpose-built Operational Tactics and Safety Training (OTST) facility opened in Craigieburn. The facility is alongside the Victorian Emergency Management Training Centre and replaced the existing facility located at Essendon Fields.

The facility includes two indoor firing ranges, a physical training area and the scenario village – a purpose-built mock village offering real-life scenario training. Police complete compulsory OTST training twice a year to maintain their skills in conflict resolution, defensive tactics and arrest scenarios.

== Demographics ==
Victoria Police employees by classification and gender as at 30 June 2016
Rank	Males	Females
Police	73.7%	26.3%
Recruits	50.5%	49.5%
Reservists	25%	75%
PSOs	90.7%	9.3%
Total sworn	74.9%	25.1%
Public servants	32.7%	67.3%
Total workforce	67.6%	32.4%

Victoria Police employees by employee type and age grouping as at 30 June 2015
Age grouping (years)	Police	Recruits	Reservists	PSOs	Public servants
<25	3.8%	31.8%		13.3%	5.5%
25–34	26.3%	44.9%		41.9%	26.5%
35–44	31%	19.6%		22.5%	24.1%
45–54	29.6%	3.7%		16.7%	24.8%
55–64	9.1%		50%	5.1%	17%
65+	0.3%		50%	0.6%	2%
Total workforce	76.1%	0.6%	0%	7.4%	16.%

== Fatal police shootings ==
From 1990 to 2004, Victorian police accounted for 38% of fatal police shootings in Australia. Victoria police were also responsible for 2 fatal police shootings between 2008 and 2011.

== Officers killed on duty ==
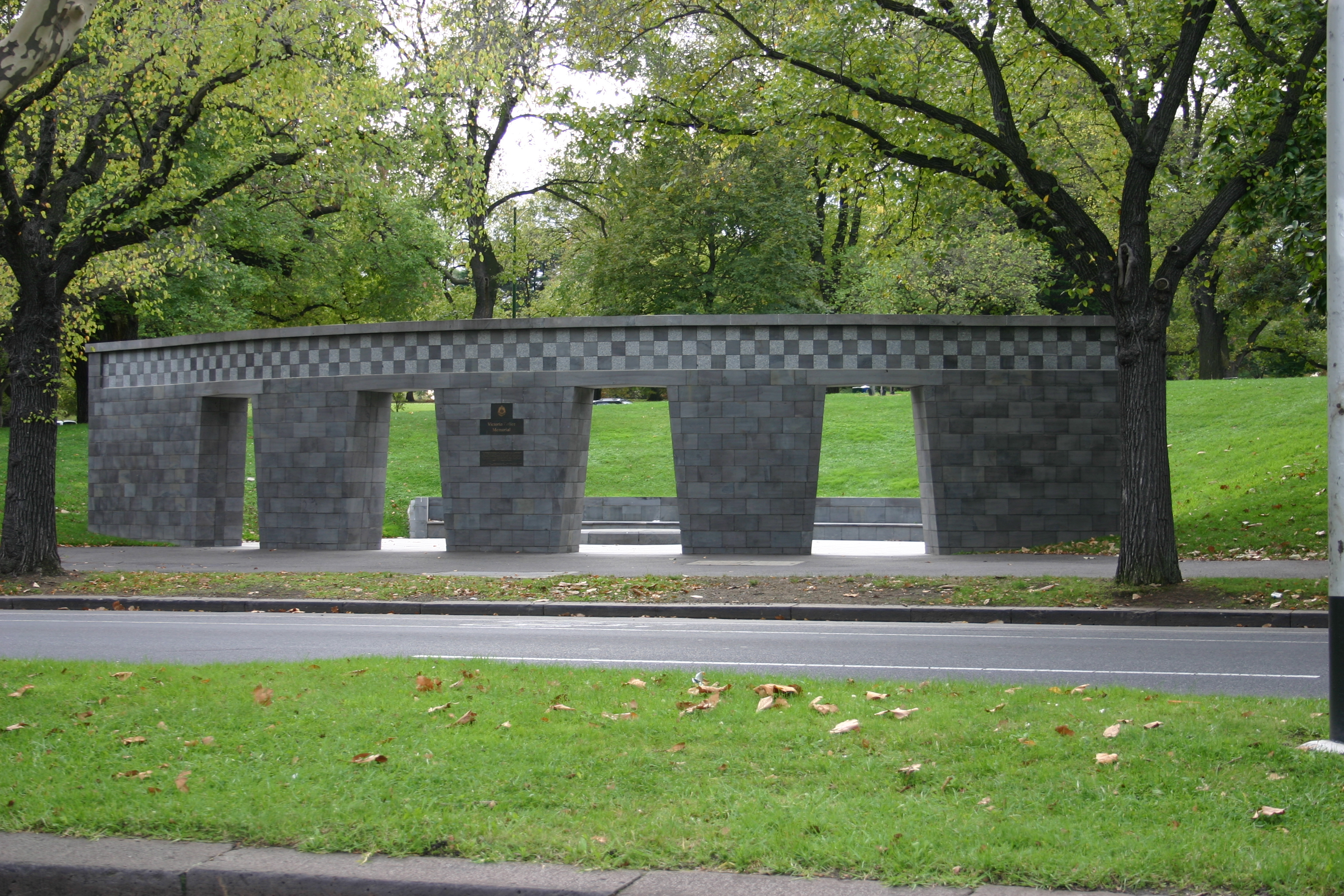
Memorial in Kings Domain, Melbourne to Victoria Police officers killed in the line of duty

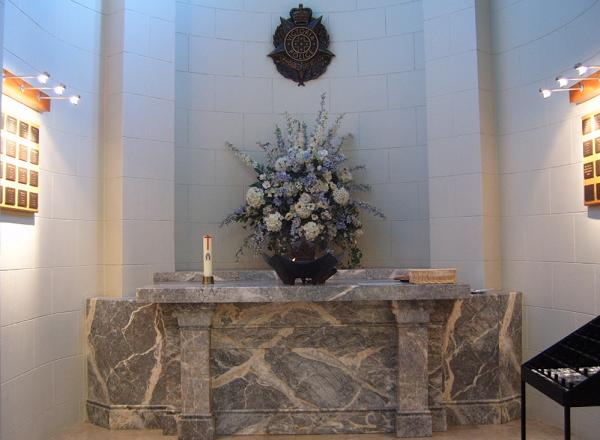
Chapel of Remembrance, within the main Chapel, Victoria Police Academy.

As of 2024, 175 Victoria Police officers have died in the line of duty, including:

- 13 July 1979, Detective Senior Constable Robert Lane was shot and killed while performing a routine interview. Lane was the first officer to be slain on duty since the end of the Vietnam War.
- 27 March 1986, Constable Angela Taylor was killed in the Russell Street Bombing. Taylor was the first female police officer killed in the line of duty in Australian history.
- 12 October 1988, officers Steven Tynan and Damian Eyre were gunned down in the Walsh Street police shootings.
- 16 August 1998, officers Gary Silk and Rodney Miller were gunned down in the Silk–Miller police murders.
- 24 April 2005, officer Anthony 'Tony' Clarke was shot with his own revolver by a drunk driver whom he had pulled over for an RBT. Clarke is the 30th member of the Victoria Police to have been feloniously slain whilst in the line of duty.
- 22 April 2020, Leading Senior Constable Lynette Taylor, Senior Constable Kevin King, Constable Glen Humphris and Constable Josh Prestney were speaking to the driver of a Porsche 911 for speeding on the Eastern Freeway, near Kew, when they were fatally struck by a truck (driven by a drugged driver) that had veered into the emergency lane where they were standing. The incident marked the worst loss of life in a single incident for the force.
- 8 April 2022, Senior Constable Bria Joyce died after a civilian vehicle crashed into her unmarked police vehicle.
- 26 August 2025, Detective Leading Senior Constable Neal Thompson and Senior Constable Vadim De Waart were killed in the Porepunkah police shootings.

Memorials to officers killed on duty are maintained at the Chapel of Remembrance within the main chapel of the Victoria Police Academy at Glen Waverley in the eastern suburbs of Melbourne. There is also a memorial to police officers who have died on duty in Kings Domain, Melbourne, as well as the National Police Memorial in Canberra. Online Honour Rolls are maintained on the Victoria Police website:

- 1800–1899
- 1900–1949
- 1950–1999
- 2000–current

== Sustainability ==
In the Victoria Police Strategy of 2023–2028, the Victorian Police commits to more sustainability in its operations including:

- Collaborating with partners to improve and reduce energy emissions
- Focusing on environmental standards to build and refurbish police stations
- Trying to implement a zero-emission strategy where possible.

== See also ==
- Australian native police
- Victoria Police Mounted Branch
- Victoria Police Special Operations Group
- Victoria Police Search and Rescue Squad
- Victoria Police Air Wing
- Critical Incident Response Team
- Victoria Police Public Order Response Team
- Victoria Police Pipe Band
- Victoria Police Academy
- Corrections Victoria
- Independent Broad-based Anti-corruption Commission
- Crime in Victoria
