= Critical Incident Response Team =

Police tactical unit of Victoria Police

- Active: 2004–present
- Country: Australia
- Agency: Victoria Police
- Type: Police tactical unit
- Role: Law enforcement
- Part of: Security Services Division
- Headquarters: Melbourne

Structure
- Sworn officers: 185

The Critical Incident Response Team (CIRT) is a specialist unit of the Victoria Police that provides assistance to general duties police, including a negotiator capability, to resolve high risk incidents utilising specialist tactics and equipment. CIRT was formed to conduct regular patrols of metropolitan Melbourne 24-hours, seven-day-per-week, ready to rapidly respond to incidents in Melbourne, and if necessary, in regional Victoria, by a small team of officers. CIRT has evolved to include conducting planned operations for high risk searches and arrests.

== History ==
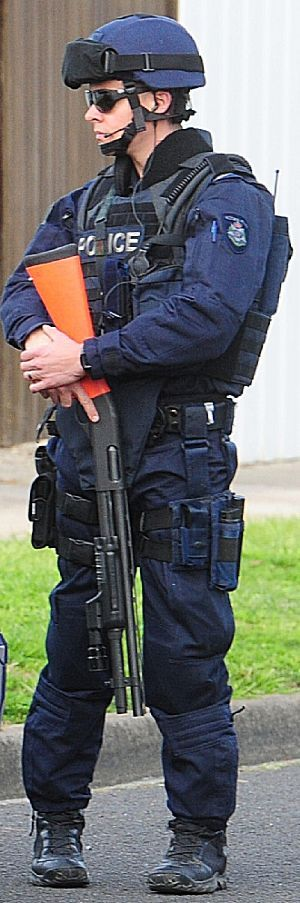
A Critical Incident Response Team member at a siege in Belmont, Geelong on 27 September 2012.

In March 2004, the Force Response Unit (FRU) launched the CIRT concept consisting of two teams of officers patrolling in a Van each to provide specialist assistance to general duties police with a primary focus on tactical support and negotiation capabilities supported by a greater range of less-than-lethal options, and as a consequence to relieve the Special Operations Group (SOG), the elite Police Tactical Group of Victoria Police, from attending incidents not within their call out criteria. Prior to the creation of CIRT, the FRU had maintained the negotiator capability for Victoria Police.

The CIRT concept was similar to the United Kingdom police armed response vehicle (ARV) that patrols ready to respond to provide specialist assistance. A CIRT unit became known as a Van due to their use of this vehicle similar to use of the acronym ARV. This concept was first considered by Victoria Police during the review of the Special Operations Group as part of Project Beacon conducted in 1995. Each CIRT consisted of a Sergeant and three other officers, one of whom was a trained negotiator. In 2010, three Vans were operated providing a third team.

As the CIRT evolved, the Force Response Unit relinquished roles to the Operational Response Unit (ORU) formed in May 2010 including the sub unit Public Order Response Team (PORT) formed in June 2011, to focus on CIRT.

Over time, certain less-than-lethal equipment used by CIRT became accessible to general duties police. In 2005, CIRT commenced using Tasers which were later trialled by general duties police in 2010. From 2014 to 2017, Tasers were rolled-out to 37 24-hour police stations in regional Victoria for general duties use. Flammable oleoresin capsicum (OC) spray was replaced as a consequence of the Taser roll-out to a water based streamer as used by CIRT. OC Foam that had been used by CIRT since inception, and that previously had only been available to general duties officers of the rank of Sergeant or above, was made available to all general duties officers in 2008.

In December 2017, CIRT introduced Security Teams to patrol the Melbourne central business district and also major events, including the use of unmarked vehicles, to enable faster response times in the event of a terrorism incident.

The television police drama Rush produced by Network Ten from 2008 to 2011 was inspired by the CIRT concept.

Notable incidents include the Bourke Street car attack in January 2017 with CIRT ramming the offender's vehicle and shooting the offender, the shooting of a couple at a fancy dress party at a King Street nightclub in July 2017, the fatal shooting of Mohammed Ibrahim in Kew in March 2020 and the fatal shooting of a male on the Monash Freeway in Dandenong North in May 2020. COVID-19 protests in the Melbourne CBD and Shrine of Remembrance war memorial in September 2021.

In December 2025, during the Boxing Day Test, CIRT officers conducted foot patrols outside the Melbourne Cricket Ground (MCG) equipped with their long-arm semiautomatic rifles. Weeks later for the Australian Open, CIRT officers equipped with their rifles conducted patrols outside the event and the approaches to Melbourne Park.

== Role ==
The primary function of CIRT is to provide a rapid specialised response to high risk incidents, such as:-

- Sieges
- Barricade incidents
- Armed offender incidents
- Violent confrontations
- Suicide interventions
- High risk escorts
- Chemical, biological, and/or radiological CBR incidents
- Cell clearances for violent prisoners

The incidents pose a threat to general duties police or are difficult to resolve due to violence or other dangers. Any general duties police supervisor can request assistance from CIRT who rapidly respond if approved by a CIRT supervisor. CIRT has specialised training and is equipped with more "less than lethal" options to resolve an incident than general duties police.

An incident may fall within the call out criteria of the SOG such as a firearms incident. The SOG has significantly higher call-out criteria than a CIRT, such as requiring Senior Commissioned officer approval, and with Vans already patrolling, this enables CIRT to rapidly respond to the incident whilst awaiting SOG arrival with CIRT providing a cordon and containment. On arrival of the SOG, CIRT can provide assistance to the SOG such as perimeter containment.

The majority of CIRT deployments are related to mental illness, for example between 2010 and 2011 of the total 685 call outs, 324 of these (47%) were mental illness related, with 29% of these mental illness call outs including drug and alcohol use.

In 2020, CIRT was called out more than 1700 times, or an average of four times per day. More than 450 CIRT deployments related to mental health incidents in 2020.

CIRT also provides close personal protection and the provision of security for protected witnesses. CIRT provides trained and qualified police negotiators and equipment such as for Special Operations Group incidents.

== Structure ==
The CIRT is part of the Security Services Division of the Transit & Public Safety command within Victoria Police, which also includes the SOG, and has a reported strength of 185 officers, including thirty two female officers. CIRT has about 50 negotiators who perform this role in addition to general CIRT duties.

In 2013, CIRT formed the Tasked Operations team to conduct planned operations for high risk search warrants on premises and high risk arrests below the scope / deployment criteria of the SOG. The Tasked Operations team consisting of 17 officers receives further training completing the Tactical Arrest Options Training (TAOT) to conduct forced entries.

== Training ==
CIRT has three intakes each year, applicants are required to meet minimum fitness requirements and successfully complete an eight-week training course. Once qualified, officers have fitness tests every six months. Every six weeks, one week is dedicated to firearms training and conducting exercises.

Specialist courses are available to complete including the negotiator course, close personal protection course and tactical arrest options course.

== Equipment ==
The original CIRT Vans were Mercedes-Benz Sprinters which were later replaced by Volkswagen Transporters. In 2018, CIRT received the SOG's former Lenco BearCat armoured vehicle.

CIRT officers have a range of specialised equipment and weapons in their inventory ranging from ballistic and tactical vests, Team Wendy EXFIL helmets, Minuteman ballistic shields, Taser 7s, bean bag rounds, ferret rounds, gas masks, riot shields, ladders, breaching tools, various oleoresin capsicum delivery systems, and the Penn Arms P540 40mm grenade launcher.

Officers are armed with Smith & Wesson M&P .40 pistols, SIG MCX SBR rifles and shotguns including the Kel-Tec KSG and Remington Model 870. Officers were formerly issued the Heckler & Koch UMP .40 sub-machine gun.

== See also ==
- Queensland Police Mobile Response Capability
- South Australia Police Security Response Section
