= Jim Illingworth =

Australian rules footballer

Personal information
- Full name: Jim Illingworth
- Born: 27 September 1901
- Died: 18 October 1967 (aged 66)
- Original team: Elsternwick

Playing career^{1}
Years	Club	Games (Goals)
1924	St Kilda	2 (0)
- ^{1} Playing statistics correct to the end of 1924.

Jim Illingworth (27 September 1901 – 18 October 1967) was an Australian rules footballer who played with St Kilda in the Victorian Football League (VFL).
