= Edward Illingworth =

English cricketer

Edward Arnold Illingworth (11 April 1896 – 2 April 1924) was an English cricketer who played first-class cricket in six matches for Warwickshire in 1920. He was born in Ossett, West Yorkshire and died at Wilthorpe, Barnsley, South Yorkshire.

Illingworth appeared in six matches in the early part of the 1920 season as a professional left-handed tail-end batsman and slow left-arm orthodox spin bowler. He made only 17 runs in 12 innings (three of them not out) and took just eight wickets, and was not offered a further contract. In his final match, the game against Surrey in June 1920, he had just come out to bat at No 11 on the final afternoon of the game with 29 still needed to avoid an innings defeat when the match had to be abandoned because of a torrential thunderstorm.
