= Charlie Illingworth =

Australian rules footballer

Personal information
- Full name: Charles Illingworth
- Born: 11 February 1871; Nerring, Victoria
- Died: 15 December 1926 (aged 55); Castlemaine, Victoria
- Original team: Bairnsdale

Playing career^{1}
Years	Club	Games (Goals)
1899	Melbourne	14 (0)
- ^{1} Playing statistics correct to the end of 1899.

Charles Illingworth (11 February 1871 – 15 December 1926) was an Australian rules footballer who played with Melbourne in the Victorian Football League (VFL).
