= Simon Illingworth =

Australian police officer

- Born: 10 November 1967 (age 59); Geelong, Australia
- Occupations: Police Officer, Writer, Business Man, Speaker,
- Known for: Fighting police corruption
- Website: Ethical Strength

Simon Illingworth (born 10 November 1967) is an Australian former police officer. He is now a farmer, business owner and CFA member.

== Career ==
He served in many different roles throughout his time with the Victoria Police, but his most significant contribution was with the Victoria Police Ethical Standards Department (the Victoria Police version of Internal Affairs) where he helped weed out and prosecute corrupt police officers.

After retiring from the force he has written a book about his experiences entitled "Filthy Rat", selling 9,000 copies before being out of print in 2007. He also appeared on "Australian Story" in May 2004 to tell his unique story and offer insight on the Melbourne underworld and police corruption.

Due to the upsurge of interest in the 1995–2004 gangland war in Melbourne sparked by the recent Australian Underbelly TV series, publisher Fontaine Press has re-released "Filthy Rat" in May 2008.

Simon appeared on a follow-up episode of "Australian Story" on 20 April 2015 alongside Robert Doyle, who Simon contacted when he was then Leader of the Opposition in the Parliament of Victoria, recounting their experiences during the anti-corruption investigations. By that time, Simon had resettled in rural Victoria and was happily married with a young family.

At the 2016 Victorian local council elections, Simon stood as a candidate for the Coastal Ward in the Shire of Corangamite and was duly elected to serve for one term until 2020.

In 2016, Simon also identified and warned of the rising number of international tourist driver caused road crashes and fatalities along the Great Ocean road; this has since become a National issue. As a CFA member Simon fought the St Patricks Day fires in south West Victoria in 2018 and also responded to the Sherbrook beach rescue where two surf life savers lost their lives attempting to rescue a drowning tourist in Easter 2019 in big seas.

== Ethical Strength ==
Simon currently runs his own company Ethical Strength with the mission to help people faced with moral and ethical dilemmas.

== See also ==
- Office of Police Integrity
