= Russell Street bombing =

Terror attack in 1986 in Melbourne, Australia

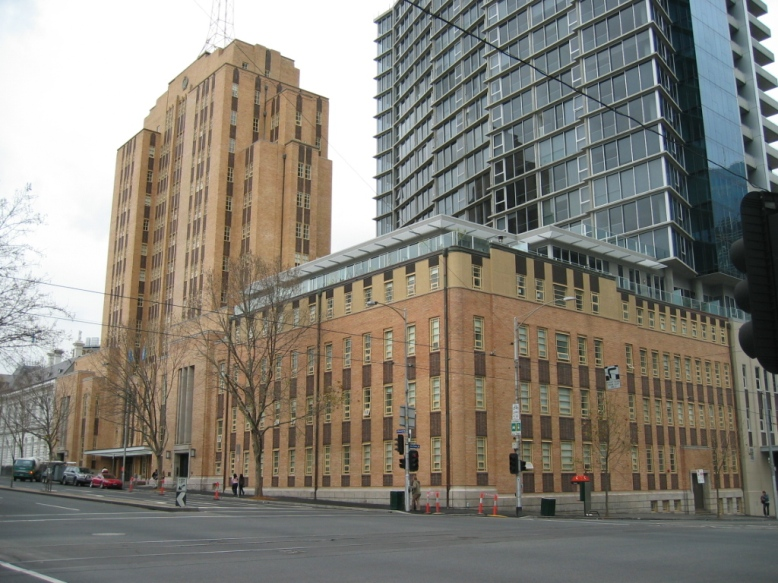
- Russell Street Police Headquarters
- Location: 37°48′29.85″S 144°57′58.19″E; Russell Street Police Headquarters, Russell Street, Melbourne, Victoria, Australia
- Date: 27 March 1986; 1:00 pm (GMT+10)
- Attack type: Car bomb
- Deaths: 1
- Injuries: 22
- Perpetrators: Craig Minogue, and Stanley Brian Taylor

The Russell Street bombing was the 27 March 1986 bombing of the Russell Street Police complex in Melbourne, Victoria, Australia. The explosion killed Angela Rose Taylor, the first Australian policewoman to be killed in the line of duty. The materials for the bomb were stolen from Tyrconnel Mine. Several men were arrested for suspected involvement with the bombing. Stanley Taylor and Craig Minogue were convicted of murder and various other offences related to the bombing. Peter Reed and Rodney Minogue were acquitted of any offences related to the bombing, but Reed was convicted of a number of offences related to his arrest, which involved a shootout with police officers in which he and an officer were wounded. He was sentenced to 12 years' imprisonment.

== Explosion ==
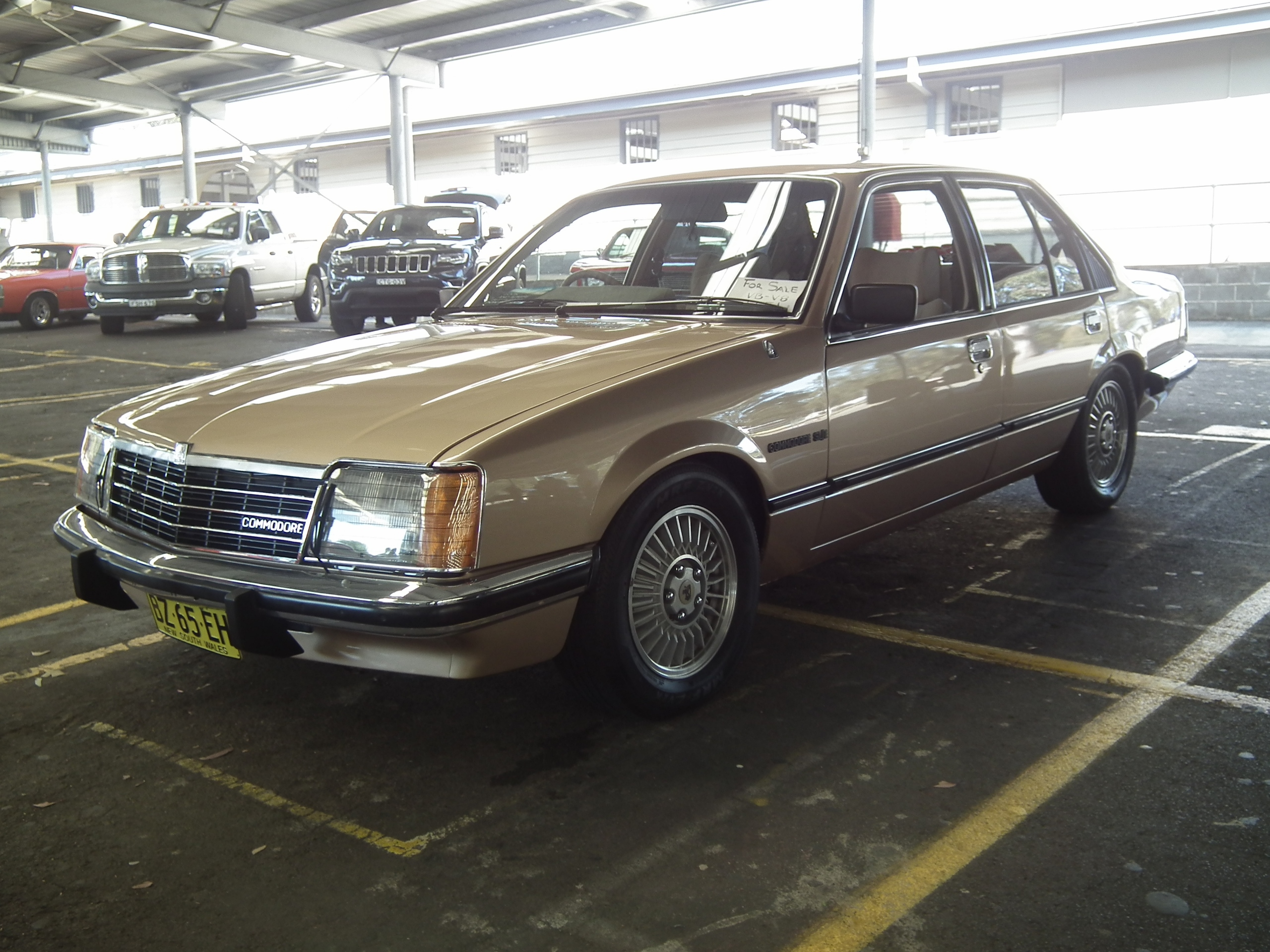
A Holden Commodore like the one used in the Russell Street bombing

The explosion was caused by a car bomb hidden in a stolen 1979 Holden Commodore, bearing Victoria registration plate AVQ-508. The explosion caused a massive amount of damage to the police station and surrounding buildings, estimated at more than A$1 million (A$5.36 million in 2025 terms). The Age reported that the blast's impact was enhanced by the open-floor design of the offices, which had acted like a Claymore mine, sending more shrapnel as the blast ripped through the floors and adding more pressure to the blast as it followed its path. The blast seriously injured 21-year-old Police Constable Angela Rose Taylor, who later died of her wounds on 20 April and became the first Australian policewoman to be killed in the line of duty. Twenty-two other people were also injured.

== Investigations ==
On 7 October 1985, gelignite and detonators were stolen from the Tyrconnel Mine at Blackwood, Victoria. On 25 March 1986, a Holden Commodore car was stolen. Both crimes were later found to provide equipment needed for the construction of the bomb.

During the earlier stages of the investigation, detectives initially believed that the bomber's target was the Melbourne Magistrates' Court located opposite the Police Headquarters. Prior to the Russell Street bombing, a series of bombings and murders had been committed against a number of Family Court judges in Sydney between June 1980 and April 1985. Detectives initially believed there was a connection, but evidence uncovered during the investigation quickly ruled out links between the Family Court attack and the Russell Street bombing.

A week after the bombing, on 4 April 1986, an anonymous caller had contacted Police Commissioner Mick Miller, stating that they had footage of the offenders responsible just before the explosion. The caller then stated they wanted US$500,000 (A$2.8 million in 2025 terms) to be placed in a Swiss bank account in exchange for the footage. The caller contacted Miller's office on five occasions; each of the calls made was traced to a series of public phone boxes in and around the St. Kilda area. In an attempt to get the caller to make contact again, Commissioner Miller and Victoria's Premier, John Cain, had made an appeal to the media and offered the caller's amount as a reward for information (not in US currency or placed in a Swiss bank account). The caller was later identified as a 38-year-old industrial chemist, Vladimir Rhychta, who was arrested while calling Commissioner Miller's office from another public phone box by a St. Kilda detective on 16 April 1986 and charged with hindering a police investigation after it was found that Rhychta's information was false. As a result, Rhychta was convicted and sentenced to two months' imprisonment.

With Rhychta's information proven to be false, the taskforce then received information from a female witness who stated that she saw a male suspect parking a Commodore identical to the bomb car in front of the Russell Street Police HQ at around 12:30 p.m. on the day of the bombing. The witness's description was enough to provide detectives with an identikit picture of the suspect; the identikit matched the description of career criminal Claudio Crupi. Crupi was an armed robber who had a hatred towards police and at the time of the bombing had a grudge against a detective in the Victoria Police Major Case Squad who worked at Russell Street. Prior to the bombing, Crupi had been charged with a burglary and was on bail. Crupi had left Melbourne shortly after the bombing. In a raid on Crupi's home, taskforce detectives found a homemade device on Crupi's kitchen table, making him a prime suspect. Detectives tracked Crupi to Sydney, where he was arrested on 15 April 1986 and brought back to Melbourne. Under police questioning, Crupi denied that he had any involvement in the bombing but admitted that the homemade device recovered in his home was a fake and was meant to be planted at a police station in Flemington.

A major breakthrough in the investigation came from a police report filed three weeks prior to the bombing. On 6 March 1986, a Victoria Police Traffic Unit was in pursuit of a stolen red Daimler Sovereign in East Keilor. During the pursuit, the Daimler turned into a side street and crashed. The driver fled on foot into nearby St. Albans where he stole another car from a passing motorist at gunpoint and made his escape. In the boot of the Daimler, police found a backpack containing a set of Victorian number plates that had been cut into pieces. When the pieces were put back together, the number plates, CCH-997, came back to a silver 1985 VK Commodore HDT that also had been stolen before the bombing. This second Commodore matched the description of a vehicle being used in an armed robbery of a bank in Donvale at 4:00 p.m. on the day of the bombing in which the vehicle was used to ram-raid the front of the bank. The vehicle was later recovered from the Yarra River at Wonga Park on 7 April 1986.

Upon the examination of the silver Commodore by the Victoria Police Stolen Motor Vehicles Squad, detectives discovered that the vehicle's VIN on the chassis had been drilled out. The drill marks on the silver Commodore's VIN were found to be identical to the VIN on the Commodore used in the bombing. With the silver Commodore's number plates recovered from the Daimler, investigators linked both the stolen Daimler and the Donvale robbery to the Russell Street Bombing.

In a statement given to the detectives, the traffic officer caught a glimpse of the driver of the Daimler during the chase, and out of a series of mugshots, identified the driver as Peter Reed. Reed (born Peter Komiazyk) was a suspected armed robber and car thief. As Reed was a person of interest in matters relating to several violent armed robberies and car thefts, his address and those of his family members (who were also suspected in matters relating to theft of motor vehicles) and several of his associates were placed under police surveillance.

One of the addresses under surveillance was a house of an associate on Haros Avenue in Nunawading. Police checks on the house identified the associate as Karl Zelinka. While Zelinka had no criminal background, he was known to Reed, who visited him on multiple occasions.

== Arrests ==
On 25 April 1986, ten Victoria police officers raided the Kallista home of Peter Michael Reed at 5:45 a.m. It was alleged that upon attempting to enforce the arrest by forcing entry to the premises, Reed produced a .455 Smith & Wesson revolver and fired at police, seriously wounding Detective Sergeant Mark Wylie. Reed was then fired upon by Det. Sgt. Steve Quinsee, hitting and wounding Reed.

During the search of Reed's home, detectives found several firearms with drill marks on the serial numbers similar to the drill marks on both the bomb car and the stolen silver Commodore. Also recovered at Reed's home was a police scanner, several stolen number plates and two detonators sitting on a backpack identical to the detonators used in the bombing. Inside the backpack were sticks of gelignite identical to those used in the Russell Street bomb.

Fingerprints found on the door of the toilet at Reed's home matched to Craig Minogue, and fingerprints found on the newspaper wrapped around the sticks of gelignite matched Craig Minogue's brother, Rodney Minogue. Further investigations had revealed that Rodney Minogue and Peter Reed had served time in prison together.

Police later raided Zelinka's house; evidence recovered matched components used in the construction of the bomb, including a fence post from a neighbouring yard that matched a block of wood found at the Russell Street scene, and a metal rubbish bin that matched a metal strip used to hold the wired components of the bomb in place.

Under police questioning, Zelinka admitted that he knew Peter Reed through his association with Craig Minogue. He also admitted that he saw Craig Minogue pulling into the garage of Zelinka's home in a Holden Commodore identical to the bomb car. Zelinka also stated that Craig Minogue had paid for Zelinka and his girlfriend to fly to Sydney for the Easter holiday with airline tickets dated the day before the bombing occurred, and the return tickets dated for after the bombing. Zelinka stated that when he and his girlfriend returned from Sydney after the bombing, he saw the Minogue brothers filling up a small trailer and was told by Craig Minogue that he and his brother were moving out from Zelinka's home. Zelinka then admitted that Craig Minogue had told him to grab the lid of the metal rubbish bin and put it on a pile of rubbish in the trailer. When the detectives asked about the pile in the trailer, Zelinka said that the Minogue brothers took the pile in the trailer to a rubbish tip.

Zelinka then told the detectives that while the Minogue brothers were staying at his home, they were visited on several occasions before the bombing by an associate known to Craig Minogue. Zelinka described the associate as an older male aged in his fifties who was referred to as "Stan the Man". That matched armed robber Stanley Brian Taylor. Born on 28 September 1937, Taylor had an extensive criminal record dating back to his childhood in the mid 1940s. He first came to the attention of the authorities at the age of eight when he was arrested for truancy and spent two years in the Bayswater Boys Home at The Basin where he was subjected to physical abuse from staff and other inmates, and had been introduced to a life of crime. In 1949, he was arrested again after being caught fishing in a prohibited area. During his early adult years, Taylor had been in and out of jail on criminal charges relating to burglary and motorcycle theft.

In 1961, Taylor had been convicted of an armed robbery of a milk bar in Clayton and was sent to Pentridge and housed in H Division, where he met Ronald Ryan. While in H Division, Ryan approached Taylor and offered him to take part in Ryan's infamous 1965 escape, but Taylor refused. Instead, Taylor and another prisoner escaped from Pentridge. While on the run, Taylor committed seven bank robberies before recaptured five days after escaping from Pentridge. While in prison, Taylor became a model prisoner and took part in several prison stage shows. In 1971, Taylor was interviewed in a television documentary about life inside Pentridge.

After his release in 1978, Taylor became a social worker to help young men avoid a life of crime. As a bit-part actor, Taylor starred in Episode 55 of Prisoner, aired in 1979, where he was a service station attendant who was robbed by Leanne Bourke's boyfriend Denny.

Detectives arrested Taylor in a pre-dawn raid on his home at Birchip on 30 May 1986. A search of Taylor's property only turned up a vehicle that later came back as stolen. Under questioning, Taylor claimed that he had no involvement in the bombing and that he knew Craig and Rodney Minogue through his job as a social worker and that he met them to prevent them from getting involved in any further crimes. He alleged that Craig Minogue, Rodney Minogue and Peter Reed were responsible for the Russell Street Bombing.

Detectives ran a search for Craig and Rodney Minogue and found that they moved into a house within close distance of Taylor's home in Birchip. A raid on the house failed to locate the Minogue Brothers but turned up evidence linking them to Russell Street Bombing. At the house, detectives recovered evidence linking the Minogue Brothers to the bombing including:

- A large high-speed engraving machine that matched the drill marks found on both the stolen silver Commodore used in the Donvale bank robbery and on the Commodore used in the bombing.
- Terrier-type dog that matched the hairs found on a travel rug recovered from the bomb car.

Hours after Taylor's arrest, detectives had located both Craig and Rodney Minogue at the Motor Inn Motel in Swan Hill. Under police questioning, Both Craig and Rodney Minogue had denied that were involved in the bombing. However, after speaking to their mother, Rodney Minogue later admitted that he and his brother along with Peter Reed and Stan Taylor was responsible for the Russell Street Bombing and had named Taylor as the mastermind behind the bombing. The motive for the bombing seems to have been revenge against the police.

Further police investigations revealed that the Minogue Brothers, Reed and Taylor were known members of an armed robbery crew dubbed the Animals and The Boys Crew. The Animals and The Boys Crew under Stan Taylor had been named in several armed robberies and several thefts of motor vehicles.

== Trial ==
Reed was charged with attempted murder, recklessly causing serious injury, using a firearm to prevent apprehension and possessing explosives in suspicious circumstances, in addition to charges related to the Russell Street bombing. Reed later reportedly stated at his trial in unsworn evidence that "the police started the shooting and I only used [my] firearm in self defence."

Prosecutors did not allege that any person played any particular role in the bombing, but that each of them were members of a team which planned the bombing and caused the bomb to explode. Evidence against the accused was as follows:

- Gelignite and detonators used in the construction of the bomb were of the same type as those stolen from a mine.
- Gelignite was found at Reed's house wrapped in newspaper with Rodney Minogue’s fingerprints on it.
- Craig Minogue owned a pair of side cutters which produced cuts similar to those found on detonator wires.
- A file with traces of brass deposits matched with brass deposits found at the bomb site.
- A block of wood from which a part of the bomb had been sawn was found at Craig Minogue's premises.
- Tinned copper wire, similar to that used with detonators at the bomb site, was found at Craig Minogue's premises.
- Residue of gelignite matched residue found at a previous address of Craig Minogue in Lower Templestowe.
- Evidence from a witness that Craig Minogue called around Easter 1986, to ask about the use of detonators.
- A witness testified that Craig Minogue was seen driving a 1979 Commodore around the CBD before the explosion.
- Karl Zelinka testified that before the bombing, he discovered a box of explosives in the garage of the Haros Avenue home.

At the end of a six-month trial in 1988 in the Supreme Court of Victoria before Justice Vincent, Taylor and Craig Minogue were convicted of murder and various other offences related to the bombing. Peter Reed and Rodney Minogue were acquitted of any offences related to the bombing, but Reed was convicted of a number of offences related to his arrest, and was sentenced to 12 years imprisonment.

Taylor was sentenced to life imprisonment with no minimum term (i.e. never to be released), the first person in Victoria to be so sentenced. Taylor died in prison at the age of 79. Craig Minogue was sentenced to life imprisonment with a minimum term of 28 years. Although Minogue thus became eligible for parole in 2016, the Victorian Parliament has twice legislated to keep him in prison. Minogue and Reed have both been recently charged with sexual assault offences that allegedly occurred just before the bombing.

== Aftermath ==
In 1995, police headquarters moved to the Victoria Police Centre with the old headquarters many years later redeveloped into an apartment complex. There is a memorial plaque to Angela Rose Taylor on the side of the building. Wylie, who was shot by Reed, later recovered from his wounds, but eventually left the police force; in July 2014, he died by suicide, aged 61.

== Media ==
- Phoenix – a 1992–1993 13-part Australian police drama television series loosely based on the Russell Street bombing
- The case was covered by Casefile True Crime Podcast on 2 and 9 July 2016.
- A dramatisation of the bombing was featured in the "A Step Closer to the Madness" episode of the Australian drama series The Newsreader, broadcast on ABC on 5 September 2021. Scenes depicting the bombing were filmed at the actual site.
