= List of acts of the Parliament of Victoria from 1980 =

This is a list of acts of the Parliament of Victoria, Australia for the year 1980.

== 1980 ==
Short title, or popular name	Citation	Royal assent
Long title
Constitutional Powers (Coastal Waters) Act 1980	No. 9366	18 March 1980
An Act to request the Parliament of the Commonwealth to enact an Act to extend the legislative Powers of the States in and in relation to Coastal Waters.
Agricultural Chemicals Act 1980 (repealed)	No. 9368	22 April 1980
An Act to provide for Pesticides to be described as Agricultural Chemicals, to make provision concerning the Use of Agricultural Chemicals, to amend the Pesticides Act 1958, (Note: Fungicides Act 1958 (No. 6257)) the Health Act 1958, (Note: Health Act 1958 (No. 6270)) the Stock Medicines Act 1958, (Note: Stock Medicines Act 1958 (No. 6384)) the Fertilizers Act 1974 (Note: Fertilizers Act 1974 (No. 8604)) and for other purposes. (Repealed by Statute Law Revision Act 1984 (No. 10087))
Central Gippsland (Brown Coal Land Compensation) Act 1980	No. 9369	30 April 1980
An Act to make Provision with respect to the Compensation payable for certain Land in Central Gippsland, and for other purposes.
Motor Car (Payments by Pensioners) Act 1980 (repealed)	No. 9370	30 April 1980
An Act to amend the Motor Car Act 1958 (Note: Motor Car Act 1958 (No. 6325)) with respect to certain Payments by Pensioners and for other purposes. (Repealed by Statute Law Revision Act 1984 (No. 10087))
Navigable Waters (Oil Pollution) (Amendment) Act 1980 (repealed)	No. 9371	
An Act to amend the Navigable Waters (Oil Pollution) Act 1960, (Note: Navigable Waters (Oil Pollution) Act 1960 (No. 6705)) to enable Public Statutory Bodies to recover the Cost of removing Oil Pollution, and for other purposes. (Repealed by Statute Law Revision Act 1984 (No. 10087))
Extractive Industries (Amendment) Act 1980 (repealed)	No. 9373	6 May 1980
An Act to amend the Extractive Industries Act 1966 (Note: Extractive Industries Act 1966 (No. 7499)) and the Town and Country Planning Act 1961. (Note: Town and Country Planning Act 1961 (No. 6849)) (Repealed by Statute Law Revision Act 1984 (No. 10087))
Railways (Bridges) Act 1980 (repealed)	No. 9377	6 May 1980
An Act to amend section 80 of the Railways Act 1958. (Note: Railways Act 1958 (No. 6355)) (Repealed by Transport Act 1983 (No. 9921))
Supply (1980-81, No. 1) Act 1980 (repealed)	No. 9379	6 May 1980
An Act to make Interim Provision for the Appropriation of Moneys out of the Consolidated Fund for the Service of the Financial Year 1980-81. (Repealed by Statute Law Revision Act 1984 (No. 10087))
Crown Land (Mineral Springs) Act 1980 (repealed)	No. 9380	6 May 1980
An Act to amend the Crown Land (Reserves) Act 1978 (Note: Crown Land (Reserves) Act 1978 (No. 9212)) with respect to Mineral Springs Reserves and for other purposes. (Repealed by Statute Law Revision Act 1984 (No. 10087))
Groundwater (Mineral Water) Act 1980 (repealed)	No. 9381	6 May 1980
An Act to make further Provision with respect to Groundwater, being Mineral Water, to amend the Groundwater Act 1969 (Note: Groundwater Act 1969 (No. 7849)) and for other purposes. (Repealed by Statute Law Revision Act 1984 (No. 10087))
Melbourne Underground Rail Loop (Land Development) Act 1980 (repealed)	No. 9382	6 May 1980
An Act to enable the Melbourne Underground Rail Loop Authority to develop certain lands, to make further Provision with respect to the powers of the Authority to borrow moneys, to amend the Melbourne Underground Rail Loop Act 1970 (Note: Melbourne Underground Rail Loop Act 1970 (No. 8023)) and for other purposes. (Repealed by Transport Act 1983 (No. 9921))
Youth, Sport and Recreation (Guarantees) Act 1980	No. 9384	6 May 1980
An Act to authorize the Treasurer of Victoria to guarantee the Repayment of Moneys borrowed by Voluntary Organizations for the Purpose of providing Sporting or Recreation Facilities.
Motor Car Traders (Amendment) Act 1980 (repealed)	No. 9386	13 May 1980
An Act to amend the Motor Car Traders Act 1973 (Note: Motor Car Traders Act 1973 (No. 8408)) and for other purposes. (Repealed by Statute Law Revision Act 1984 (No. 10087))
Country Fire Authority (Amendment) Act 1980 (repealed)	No. 9389	13 May 1980
An Act to amend the Country Fire Authority Act 1958. (Note: Country Fire Authority Act 1958 (No. 6228)) (Repealed by Statute Law Revision Act 1984 (No. 10087))
Upper Yarra Valley and Dandenong Ranges Authority (Amendment) Act 1980	No. 9395	13 May 1980
An Act to amend the Upper Yarra Valley and Dandenong Ranges Authority Act 1976. (Note: Upper Yarra Valley and Dandenong Ranges Authority Act 1976 (No. 8968)))
Hospitals Superannuation (Amendment) Act 1980 (repealed)	No. 9397	13 May 1980
An Act to amend the Hospitals Superannuation Act 1965 (Note: Hospitals Superannuation Act 1965 (No. 7354)) and for other purposes. (Repealed by Statute Law Revision Act 1984 (No. 10087))
Motor Registration Act 1980 (repealed)	No. 9403	20 May 1980
An Act to transfer the staff and administration of the Motor Registration Branch to the Transport Regulation Board, to expand the membership of the Transport Regulation Board for certain purposes, to amend the Commercial Goods Vehicles Act 1958, (Note: Commercial Goods Vehicles Act 1958 (No. 6222)) the Country Roads Act 1958, (Note: Country Roads Act 1958 (No. 6229)) the Motor Car Act 1958, the Recreation Vehicles Act 1973, (Note: Recreation Vehicles Act 1973 (No. 8407)) the Stamps Act 1958, (Note: Stamps Act 1958 (No. 6375)) the Transport Regulation Act 1958, (Note: Transport Regulation Act 1958 (No. 6400)) and for other purposes. (Repealed by Transport Act 1983 (No. 9921))
Epworth Hospital Act 1980 or the Epworth Foundation Act 1980	No. 9404	20 May 1980
An Act to establish a Body Corporate under the name of Epworth Hospital, to repeal the Epworth Hospital (Guarantee) Act 1977 (Note: Epworth Hospital (Guarantee) Act 1977 (No. 8986)) and the Epworth Hospital (Guarantee) (Amendment) Act 1977, (Note: Epworth Hospital (Guarantee) (Amendment) Act 1977 (No. 9034)) and for other purposes.
Archaeological and Aboriginal Relics Preservation (Amendment) Act 1980 (repealed)	No. 9405	20 May 1980
An Act to amend the Archaeological and Aboriginal Relics Preservation Act 1972, (Note: Archaeological and Aboriginal Relics Preservation Act 1972 (No. 8273)) the Ministry for Conservation Act 1972, (Note: Ministry for Conservation Act 1972 (No. 8364)) and the National Museum of Victoria Council Act 1970. (Note: National Museum of Victoria Council Act 1970 (No. 8072)) (Repealed by Statute Law Revision Act 1984 (No. 10087))
Geelong Performing Arts Centre Trust Act 1980	No. 9406	20 May 1980
An Act to Constitute the Geelong Performing Arts Centre Trust, to make Provision with,respect to the Construction, Management and Operation of the Geelong Performing Arts Centre and for other purposes.
Imperial Law Re-enactment Act 1980 (repealed)	No. 9407	20 May 1980
An Act to re-enact certain Imperial Laws applying in Victoria as part of the Statute Law of Victoria, to repeal Part III. of the Imperial Acts Application Act 1922, (Note: Imperial Acts Application Act 1922 (13 Geo. V. No. 3270)) to amend various Acts and for other purposes. (Repealed by Statute Law Revision Act 1984 (No. 10087))
Constitutional Powers (Request) Act 1980	No. 9408	20 May 1980
An Act to request the Parliament of the Commonwealth to enact an Act to remove certain Restrictions on the Exercise of Legislative Power by the Parliament of Victoria.
Baker Medical Research Institute Act 1980	No. 9411	20 May 1980
An Act to establish a Body Corporate under the name of the Baker Medical Research Institute and for related purposes.
Stamps (Amendment) Act 1980 (repealed)	No. 9413	20 May 1980
An Act to amend the Stamps Act 1958. (Repealed by Statute Law Revision Act 1984 (No. 10087))
Liquified Petroleum Gas Subsidy Act 1980	No. 9414	20 May 1980
An Act to subsidize the cost of Liquified Petroleum Gas when used for certain purposes.
Transport (Road Funds) Act 1980 (repealed)	No. 9418	20 May 1980
An Act to validate certain payments made out of the Roads (Special Projects) Fund, to close the Road Maintenance Account in the Country Roads Board Fund, to abolish the Roads (Special Projects) Fund, to amend the Business Franchise (Petroleum Products) Act 1979, (Note: Business Franchise (Petroleum Products) Act 197] (No. 9272)) the Commercial Goods Vehicles Act 1958, the Country Roads Act 1958, the Motor Car Act 1958 and for other purposes. (Repealed by Transport Act 1983 (No. 9921))
Legal Profession Practice (Leo Cussen Institute) Act 1980 (repealed)	No. 9420	20 May 1980
An Act to make Provision with respect to the Funding of the Leo Cussen Institute for Continuing Legal Education, to amend the Legal Profession Practice Act 1958 (Note: Legal Profession Practice Act 1958 (No. 6291)) and for other purposes. (Repealed by Statute Law Revision Act 1984 (No. 10087))
Instruments (Powers of Attorney) Act 1980 (repealed)	No. 9421	20 May 1980
An Act to amend the law with respect to Powers of Attorney, to re-enact Part XI. of the Instruments Act 1958, (Note: Instruments Act 1958 (No. 6279)) to amend the Public Trustee Act 1958, (Note: Public Trustee Act 1958 (No. 6350)) the Transfer of Land Act 1958 (Note: Transfer of Land Act 1958 (No. 6399)) and the Trustee Companies Act 1958 (Note: Trustee Companies Act 1958 (No. 6402)) and for other purposes. (Repealed by Statute Law Revision Act 1984 (No. 10087))
Post-Secondary Education (Amendment) Act 1980 (repealed)	No. 9424	20 May 1980
An Act to amend the Post-Secondary Education Act 1978, (Note: Post-Secondary Education Act 1978 (No. 9145)) to repeal the Victoria Institute of Colleges Act 1965 (Note: Victoria Institute of Colleges Act 1965 (No. 7291)) and the State College of Victoria Act 1972 (Note: State College of Victoria Act 1972 (No. 8376)) and for other purposes. (Repealed by Statute Law Revision Act 2013 (No. 70 of 2013)
Imperial Acts Application Act 1980	No. 9426	27 May 1980
An Act to make further provision with respect to certain enactments of the Parliament of England and of the Parliament of Great Britain and of the Parliament of the United Kingdom of Great Britain and Ireland in force at the time of the passing of the Act 9 George IV. c. LXXXIII., (Note: Australian Courts Act 1828 (9 Geo. 4. c. 83 (Imp))) to incorporate into the Statute Law of Victoria certain of such enactments, to amend the Imperial Acts Application Act 1922 and for other purposes.
Statute Law Revision Act 1980 (repealed)	No. 9427	27 May 1980
An Act to revise Statute Law. (Repealed by Statute Law Revision Act 1984 (No. 10087))
Estate Agents Act 1980	No. 9428	27 May 1980
An Act to re-enact with Amendments the Law relating to Estate Agents and Sub-agents.
Bank of Adelaide (Merger) Act 1980	No. 9430	30 September 1980
An Act to supplement The Bank of Adelaide (Merger) Act 1980 (Note: Bank of Adelaide (Merger) Act 1980 (No. 59 (SA))) of the State of South Australia which provides for the transfer to Australia and New Zealand Banking Group Limited of the undertaking of The Bank of Adelaide and for the transfer to Australia and New Zealand Savings Bank Limited of the undertaking of The Bank of Adelaide Savings Bank Limited and for other purposes.
Cemeteries (Amendment) Act 1980 (repealed)	No. 9431	7 October 1980
An Act to amend the Cemeteries Act 1958 (Note: Cemeteries Act 1958 (No. 6217)) to permit Burials in Private Mausoleums at Public Cemeteries and for other purposes. (Repealed by Statute Law Revision (Repeals) Act 1999 (No. 3 of 1999))
Alcoa (Portland Aluminium Smelter) Act 1980	No. 9434	11 November 1980
An Act to ratify validate approve and otherwise give Effect to an Agreement between the Premier for and on behalf of the State of Victoria and Alcoa of Australia Limited with respect to the establishment of an aluminium smelter at Portland in the State of Victoria and for the Granting of certain other Rights incidental to establishing and carrying on such a smelter and for other purposes.
Country Roads (Road Marking) Act 1980 (repealed)	No. 9437	18 November 1980
An Act to amend section 113 of the Country Roads Act 1958. (Repealed by Transport Act 1983 (No. 9921))
Appropriation (1980-81, No. 1) Act 1980 (repealed)	No. 9443	28 November 1980
An Act to appropriate certain Sums out of the Consolidated Fund for the Service of the Financial Year 1980-81 and to appropriate the Supplies granted in the last preceding Session of Parliament and for other purposes. (Repealed by Statute Law Revision Act 1984 (No. 10087))
Stamps (Amendment No. 2) Act 1980 (repealed)	No. 9445	2 December 1980
An Act to amend the Stamps Act 1958 and for other purposes. (Repealed by Statute Law Revision Act 1984 (No. 10087))
Criminal Injuries Compensation (Amendment) Act 1980	No. 9447	2 December 1980
An Act to amend Section 14 of the Criminal Injuries Compensation Act 1972. (Note: Criminal Injuries Compensation Act 1972 (No. 8359))
Transport Works and Services Act 1980 (repealed)	No. 9448	2 December 1980
An Act to authorize Expenditure on Works and Services and other Purposes relating to Railways and other services. (Repealed by Transport Act 1983 (No. 9921))
Youth, Sport and Recreation (Agreements) Act 1980	No. 9449	2 December 1980
An Act to amend the Youth, Sport and Recreation Act 1972 (Note: Youth, Sport and Recreation Act 1972 (No. 8344)) with respect to the powers of the Minister to enter into agreements and arrangements and for other purposes.
Agriculture Acts (Repeal) Act 1980 (repealed)	No. 9456	9 December 1980
An Act to repeal the Brands Act 1928 (Note: Brands Act 1928 (19 Geo. V. No. 3646)) and the Cattle Breeding Act 1958. (Note: Cattle Breeding Act 1958 (No. 6215)) (Repealed by Statute Law Revision Act 1984 (No. 10087))
State Bank Act 1980 (repealed)	No. 9458	9 December 1980
An Act to constitute the Commissioners of the State Savings Bank of Victoria into the Commissioners of the State Bank of Victoria, to amend the State Savings Bank Act 1958 (Note: State Savings Bank Act 1958 (No. 6379)) in relation thereto and for other purposes. (Repealed by Statute Law Revision Act 1984 (No. 10087))
Attorney-General and Solicitor-General Act 1980 (repealed)	No. 9462	16 December 1980
An Act to amend the Attorney-General and Solicitor-General Act 1972 (Note: Attorney-General and Solicitor-General Act 1972 (No. 8305)) with respect to the Remuneration and Pension of the Solicitor-General. (Repealed by Statute Law Revision Act 1984 (No. 10087))
Railway Construction and Property (Amendment) Act 1980 (repealed)	No. 9463	16 December 1980
An Act to amend the Railway Construction and Property Board Act 1979 (Note: Railway Construction and Property Board Act 1979 (No. 9345)) in relation to the Establishment and Operation of a Railway Construction and Property Fund, and in relation to the Vesting of Crown Land in the Board, and for other purposes. (Repealed by Transport Act 1983 (No. 9921))
Institute of Educational Administration Act 1980	No. 9465	16 December 1980
An Act to establish a Body Corporate under the Name of the Institute of Educational Administration, and for other purposes.
Liquor Control (Fees) Act 1980 (repealed)	No. 9472	16 December 1980
An Act to amend the Liquor Control Act 1968 (Note: Liquor Control Act 1968 (No. 7695)) with respect to Licence Fees and the Orderly Marketing of Packaged Beer. (Repealed by Statute Law Revision Act 1984 (No. 10087))
Motor Car (Miscellaneous Provisions) Act 1980 (repealed)	No. 9477	23 December 1980
An Act to amend the Motor Car Act 1958 with respect to the Cancellation of Licences and Permits issued under Part III., the use of Breath Analysing Instruments and for other purposes. (Repealed by Statute Law Revision Act 1984 (No. 10087))
Post-Secondary Education Remuneration Tribunal Act 1980	No. 9485	23 December 1985
An Act to establish a Post-Secondary Education Remuneration Tribunal and for other purposes.
Port Phillip Authority (Amendment) Act 1980 (repealed)	No. 9487	23 December 1980
An Act to amend the Port Phillip Authority Act 1966 (Note: Port Phillip Authority Act 1966 (No. 7498)) to alter the membership of the Port Phillip Authority, to amend the Town and Country Planning Act 1961 and the Ministry for Conservation Act 1972 (Note: Ministry for Conservation Act 1972 (No. 8364)) and for other purposes. (Repealed by Statute Law Revision Act 1995 (No. 11 of 1995))
Country Fire Authority (Penalties) Act 1980 (repealed)	No. 9488	23 December 1980
An Act to amend the Country Fire Authority Act 1958. (Repealed by Statute Law Revision Act 1984 (No. 10087))
Coroners (Amendment) Act 1980 (repealed)	No. 9493	23 December 1980
An Act to amend the Coroners Act 1958 (Note: Coroners Act 1958 (No. 6227)) and the Magistrates (Summary Proceedings) Act 1975 (Note: Magistrates (Summary Proceedings) Act 1975 (No. 8731)) with respect to Depositions. (Repealed by Statute Law Revision Act 1984 (No. 10087))
Liquor Control (Amendment) Act 1980 (repealed)	No. 9496	23 December 1980
An Act to amend the Liquor Control Act 1968 and for other purposes. (Repealed by Statute Law Revision (Repeals) Act 1999 (No. 3 of 1999))
Court Security Act 1980	No. 9499	23 December 1980
An Act to make Provisions in relation to the secure and orderly operation of Courts and other Tribunals, and for other purposes.
Stamps (Amendment No. 3) Act 1980 (repealed)	No. 9502	23 December 1980
An Act to amend the Stamps Act 1958 and for other purposes. (Repealed by Statute Law Revision Act 1984 (No. 10087))
Road Traffic (Amendment) Act 1980 (repealed)	No. 9503	23 December 1980
An Act to amend the Road Traffic Act 1958, (Note: Road Traffic Act 1958 (No. 6359)) the Motor Car Act 1958 and for other purposes. (Repealed by Transport Act 1983 (No. 9921))
Crimes (Sexual Offences) Act 1980 (repealed)	No. 9509	23 December 1980
An Act to amend the Law relating to Sexual Offences, to amend the Crimes Act 1958, (Note: Crimes Act 1958 (No. 6231)) the Evidence Act 1958, (Note: Evidence Act 1958 (No. 6246)) the Vagrancy Act 1966, (Note: Vagrancy Act 1966 (No. 7393)) the Summary Offences Act 1966, (Note: Summary Offences Act 1966 (No. 7405)) the Magistrates' Courts Act 1971 (Note: Magistrates' Courts Act 1971 (No. 8184)) and the Magistrates (Summary Proceedings) Act 1975, and for other purposes. (Repealed by Statute Law Revision Act 1984 (No. 10087))
Adoption of Children (Information) Act 1980	No. 9510	23 December 1980
An Act to make Provision for Access to Information concerning Adoptions and for that Purpose to amend the Adoption of Children Act 1964 (Note: Adoption of Children Act 1964 (No. 7147)) and for other purposes.
Transport (Deregulation) Act 1980 (repealed)	No. 9511	23 December 1980
An Act to make Provision with respect to the Operation of Commercial Goods Vehicles, to provide that the Victorian Railways Board shall cease to be a Common Carrier, to amend the North Geelong to Fyansford Railway Construction Act 1916, (Note: North Geelong to Fyansford Railway Construction Act 1916 (7 Geo. V. No. 2870)) the Motor Car Act 1958, the Railways Act 1958 and the Transport Regulation Act 1958, to amend and subsequently repeal the Commercial Goods Vehicles Act 1958 and for other purposes. (Repealed by Transport Act 1983 (No. 9921))
Planning Appeals Board Act 1980 or the Planning Appeals Act 1980 (repealed)	No. 9512	23 December 1981
An Act to make Provision for the Establishment and Constitution of a Planning Appeals Board, to confer Jurisdiction thereon, to amend the Country Roads Act 1958, the Drainage Areas Act 1958, (Note: Drainage Areas Act 1958 (No. 6237)) the Health Act 1958, the Local Government Act 1958, (Note: Local Government Act 1958 (No. 6299)) the Town and Country Planning Act 1961, the Port Phillip Authority Act 1966, the Strata Titles Act 1967, (Note: Strata Titles Act 1967 (No. 7551)) the Environment Protection Act 1970, (Note: Environment Protection Act 1970 (No. 8056)) the Cluster Titles Act 1974, (Note: Cluster Titles Act 1974 (No. 8661)) the Drainage of Land Act 1975 (Note: Drainage of Land Act 1975 (No. 8811)) and the Central Gippsland (Brown Coal Land Compensation) Act 1980 (Note: Central Gippsland (Brown Coal Land Compensation) Act 1980 (No. 9369)) and for other purposes. (Repealed by Tribunals and Licensing Authorities (Miscellaneous Amendments) Act 1998 (No. 52 of 1998))
West Gate Bridge Authority Act 1980	No. 9513	23 December 1980
An Act to establish the West Gate Bridge Authority as a statutory authority, to confer certain powers on the Authority, to repeal the Lower Yarra Crossing Authority Act 1965 (Note: Lower Yarra Crossing Authority Act 1965 (No. 7365)) and for other purposes.
Residential Tenancies Act 1980 (repealed)	No. 9514	23 December 1980
An Act to simplify and modernize the Law relating to Residential Tenancies, to define the Rights and Duties of Landlords and Tenants of Residential Premises, to promote the quick and inexpensive Resolution of Disputes between Landlords and Tenants of Residential Premises, to provide for a Residential Tenancies Tribunal, to amend the Landlord and Tenant Act 1958, (Note: Landlord and Tenant Act 1958 (No. 6285)) the Ministry of Consumer Affairs Act 1973 (Note: Ministry of Consumer Affairs Act 1973 (No. 8442)) and the Administrative Law Act 1978 (Note: Administrative Law Act 1978 (No. 9234)) and for other purposes. (Repealed by Residential Tenancies Act 1997 (No. 109 of 1997))
Building Societies (Amendment) Act 1980	No.	
Building Societies (Claims on Liquidation) Act 1980	No.	
Business Franchise (Tobacco) (Amendment) Act 1980	No.	
Cancer (Amendment) Act 1980	No.	
Cancer (Cancer Reporting) Act 1980	No.	
Cattle Compensation (Amendment) Act 1980	No.	
Charlton (Land Exchange) Act 1980	No.	
Chiropodists (Amendment) Act 1980	No.	
Community Welfare Services (Extradition) Act 1980	No.	
Dog (Amendment) Act 1980	No.	
Educational Grants (Continuation) Act 1980	No.	
Educational Institutions (Guarantees) (Amendment) Act 1980	No.	
Egg Industry Stabilization (Amendment) Act 1980	No.	
Estate Agents (Amendment) Act 1980	No.	
Fisheries (Amendment) Act 1980	No.	
Forests (Amendment) Act 1980	No.	
Forests (Australian Newsprint Mills Limited) Act 1980	No.	
Forests (Further Amendment) Act 1980	No.	
Forests (Penalties) Act 1980	No.	
Friendly Societies (Benefits) Act 1980	No.	
Gift Duty (Amendment) Act 1980	No.	
Hairdressers Registration (Amendment) Act 1980	No.	
Health (Reporting to Parliament) Act 1980	No.	
Health (Special Accommodation Houses) Act 1980	No.	
Health Commission (Amendment) Act 1980	No.	
Home Finance (Borrowing Powers) Act 1980	No.	
Hospitals and Charities (Appointment of Administrators) Act 1980	No.	
Judges' Salaries and Pensions Act 1980	No.	
Labour and Industry (Amendment) Act 1980	No.	
Labour and Industry (Lifting of Weights) Act 1980	No.	
Land Tax Act 1980	No.	
Local Authorities Superannuation (Amendment) Act 1980	No.	
Local Government (General Amendment) Act 1980	No.	
Local Government (Validation) Act 1980	No.	
Magistrates' Courts (Jurisdiction) Act 1980	No.	
Marine (Amendment) Act 1980	No.	
Market Court (Amendment) Act 1980	No.	
Melbourne (Yarra Park) Land Act 1980	No.	
Mildura College Lands (Easements) Act 1980	No.	
Mildura Irrigation and Water Trusts Act 1980	No.	
Nurses (Amendment) Act 1980	No.	
Old Colonists' Association (Borrowing Powers) Act 1980	No.	
Parliamentary Committees (Public Bodies Review) Act 1980	No.	
Parliamentary Committees Act 1980	No.	
Parliamentary Salaries and Superannuation Act 1980	No.	
Patriotic Funds (Amendment) Act 1980	No.	
Pay-roll Tax Act 1980	No.	
Pensioners' Rates Remission Act 1980	No.	
Police Regulation (Amendment) Act 1980	No.	
Police Regulation (Charges and Appeals) Act 1980	No.	
Police Regulation (Retired Police Reserve) Act 1980	No.	
Port of Melbourne Authority (Amendment) Act 1980	No.	
Probate Duty Act 1980	No.	
Professional Boxing Control (Amendment) Act 1980	No.	
Protection of Animals (Amendment) Act 1980	No.	
Protection of Animals Act 1980	No.	
Public Authorities (Contributions) (Amendment) Act 1980	No.	
Public Lands and Works (Amendment) Act 1980	No.	
Public Service (Amendment) Act 1980	No.	
Public Works and Services Act 1980	No.	
Racing (Amendment) Act 1980	No.	
Racing (Further Amendment) Act 1980	No.	
Revocation and Excision of Crown Reservations Act 1980	No.	
Sale of Land (Deposits Amendment) Act 1980	No.	
Sale of Land Deposits Act 1980	No.	
Sewerage Districts (Rebates) Act 1980	No.	
State Employees Retirement Benefits (Amendment) Act 1980	No.	
State Employees Retirement Benefits (Eligibility) Act 1980	No.	
State Forests Works and Services Act 1980	No.	
Subordinate Legislation (Amendment) Act 1980	No.	
Superannuation Act 1980	No.	
Supreme Court (Criminal Appeals) Act 1980	No.	
Swine Compensation (Partial Suspension) Act 1980	No.	
Teaching Service (Amendment) Act 1980	No.	
Town and Country Planning (Amalgamation) Act 1980	No.	
Valuation of Land (Interest Rate) Act 1980	No.	
Victorian Film Corporation (Amendment) Act 1980	No.	
Victorian Film Corporation (Commencement) Act 1980	No.	
Victorian Government Travel Authority (Amendment) Act 1980	No.	
Victorian Solar Energy Council Act 1980	No.	
Wangerrip (Land Exchange) Act 1980	No.	
Water (Amendment) Act 1980	No.	
Water (Valuation Equalization) Act 1980	No.	
Water Supply Works and Services Act 1980	No.	
Wildlife (Amendment) Act 1980	No.	
Wodonga Area Land Acquisition (Validation) Act 1980	No.	
Workers Compensation (General Amendment) Act 1980	No.	

== Sources ==
- "1980 Victorian Historical Acts". AustLII.
