= Noel Wilby =

Australian police officer (1914–1975)

Noel Wilby LVO QPM

14th Chief Commissioner of Victoria Police
- In office 1 February 1969 – 5 October 1971
- Preceded by: Rupert Arnold
- Succeeded by: Reginald Jackson

Personal details
- Born: Noel Wilby; 1914
- Died: 1975 (aged 60–61)
- Occupation: Police officer

Noel Wilby LVO QPM (1914–1975) was an Australian police officer and chief commissioner of Victoria Police from 1969 to 1971.

Wilby, the son of a butcher from Bendigo, joined Victoria Police in 1938. Wilby served on the beat, in the homicide squad and in the wireless squad. In 1963, he was promoted to assistant commissioner and given responsibility for traffic and technical matters. In 1968 he was appointed to deputy commissioner and one year later was appointed chief commissioner on the resignation of Rupert Arnold.

Poor health affected Wilby's term as chief commissioner. He suffered from hypertension and in 1970, a heart attack. In 1971 Wilby retired from the force, on the advice of his doctor.

== Honours and awards ==

Lieutenant of the Royal Victorian Order (LVO)	29 May 1970	For service as Chief Commissioner of the Victoria Police during the 1970 royal visit by Queen Elizabeth II. Originally appointed as a member fourth class. Re-classified as Lieutenant in 1984.
Queens Police Medal (QPM)	1 January 1971	New Year Honours
Police Long Service and Good Conduct Medal		

Police appointments
Preceded by Rupert Arnold	Chief Commissioner of Victoria Police; 1969–1971	Succeeded by Reginald Jackson
