= Craig Minogue =

Australian murderer

Craig William John Minogue
- Minogue c. 1986
- Born: 1962 (age 63–64); Australia
- Occupation: Convicted murder
- Status: Incarcerated
- Criminal charge: Murder
- Penalty: Life imprisonment, with a non-parole period of 30 years

Craig William John Minogue (born 1962) is an Australian convicted murderer responsible for the 1986 bombing of the Russell Street Police Headquarters in Russell Street, Melbourne, Victoria, Australia. Minogue was sentenced to life imprisonment, with a non-parole period of 30 years. In 2012, Minogue was awarded his PhD in applied ethics, human and social services by La Trobe University. The thesis, entitled "Seeing who's who: identifying a violently oppositional sense of self and other which is emerging from an immoral discourse of punishment and revenge" is not available to the public for safety reasons. Access is restricted until November 2027.

== Russell Street Bombing ==
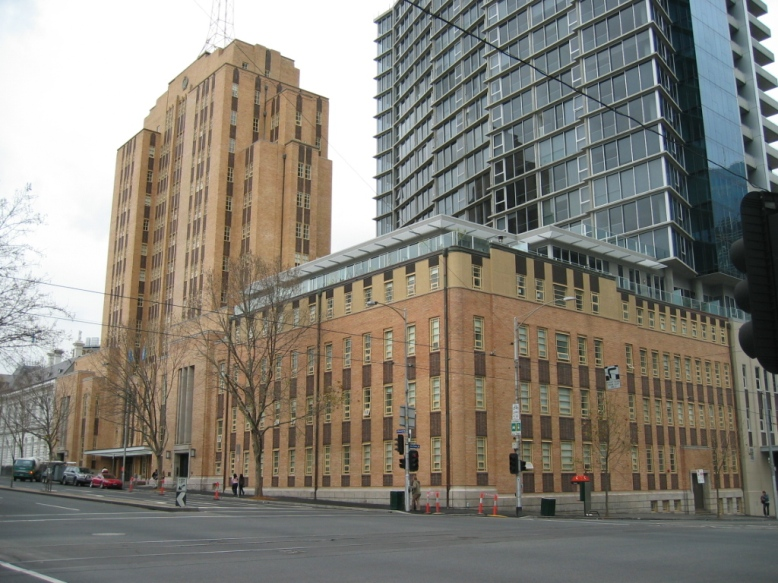
The Russell Street Police Headquarters.

The Russell Street Bombing occurred at approximately 1 pm on 27 March 1986, Holy Thursday. The blast killed 21-year-old Constable Angela Taylor, left 22 people injured and caused massive damage to the Russell Street Police Headquarters and surrounding buildings, with damage estimated at over $500,000.

== Prison life ==
At about 11.30 am on 22 July 1988, in the maximum security industry yard, Craig Minogue, then 26, beat Alex Tskamakis, 40, to death with a pillow case loaded with 5 kg gym weights.

Minogue initiated many legal challenges against the Victorian government, mostly concerning his treatment while imprisoned. In 2002 Minogue applied unsuccessfully to the Victorian Civil and Administrative Tribunal (VCAT) and sought copies of prison management and operation manuals. His request was refused, but he was granted access to limited information and restricted to viewing such information while within the prison library. This decision was widely criticised by academics and lawyers as promoting a lack of administrative transparency in the prison system and creating a situation where the rules that prisoners are supposed to abide by are concealed from them.

In 2005, Minogue, who entered the prison system illiterate, completed his Bachelor of Arts degree with honours from Deakin University. In the same year he was accepted as a PhD student at La Trobe University, the first prisoner in Australia and one of the few in the world to do so. Minogue uses his website to post information about his academic work. He writes on his website that he is remorseful for his crimes, and claims that he is among the victims. He also condemns the media's annual remembrance of his crimes, stating that his victims would not want the events remembered.

In a coronial inquest into deaths in the fire at the prison Minogue gave evidence over three days. At the completion of the inquest, the State Coroner found Corrections Victoria was, in his words, "moribund and corrupt". A book by Monash University academic and historian Dr. Bree Carlton, Imprisoning Resistance, examined prisoner resistance which led to the Jika Jika fire.

== Parole ==
In 2016, after it was revealed Minogue had applied for parole and following media and public pressure on the Victorian government, the Parliament of Victoria legislated to eliminate the possibility of parole for persons "convicted and sentenced" to a term of imprisonment "for the murder of a person who the prisoner knew was, or was reckless as to whether the person was, a police officer" unless the board is satisfied that the prisoner is in imminent danger of dying or is seriously incapacitated. The law was applied retrospectively and impacted Minogue's application for parole.

=== High Court 2018 ===
In 2017, Minogue sought to challenge the validity of the new legislation. On 20 June 2018, the High Court unanimously held that the section did not apply to Minogue because he was not sentenced on the basis that the prisoner knew, or was reckless as to whether, the person murdered was a police officer.

=== High Court 2019 ===
On 1 August 2018, the Victorian parliament amended the Corrections Act to section 74AB that Minogue personally could not be granted parole unless the board is satisfied that he is in imminent danger of dying or is seriously incapacitated. This was based on provisions in relation to Kevin Crump and Julian Knight that the High Court had previously upheld. The High Court held that a prisoner had no right to be released on parole and the decision was an exercise of the executive power. The punishment imposed by the court was the life sentence and while the legislation removed any practical hope Minogue had for release on parole, this did not alter the sentence imposed by the court.

== Other charges ==
On 23 May 2019, Minogue was charged with 38 offences including abduction by force and aggravated rape. The charges related to two alleged offences which occurred on 22 November 1985 and 26 March 1986, the day before the Russell Street bombing. Charged with the same offences was Peter Komiazyk (aka Peter Reed) who was also involved with the Russell St bombing. Police alleged that a third man, Stanley Taylor, participated in the alleged rape in March 1986. Taylor, the instigator of the bombing, died in prison in 2016. A fourth man is yet to be identified.

== Selected works ==
- Minogue, Craig. 'Legal Professional Privilege?', Alternative Law Journal, Vol. 17, No.6, December 1992.
- Minogue, Craig. 'Human rights and excursions from the flat lands', Alternative Law Journal, Vol 25, No.3, June 2000, pp. 145–146.
- Minogue, Craig. 'Frustrated Access to Educational Programmes', Abolition, Vol. 1, August 2001, pp. 12–24.
- Minogue, Craig. 'Downsizing', Winnowings, School of Literary & Communication Studies, Deakin University Geelong, Victoria, 2002, pp. 146–150.
- Minogue, Craig. 'An Insider's View: Human rights and excursions from the flat lands', in Brown, David and Wilkie, Meredith, (eds) Prisoners as Citizens: Human Rights in Australian Prisons, The Federation Press, Annandale, NSW, 2002, pp. 196–212.
- Minogue, Craig. 'Welcome Home Dad', Crossfire (Deakin University Student Association Magazine), No. 15, 7 October 2002, Deakin University Geelong, Victoria, p. 8.
- Minogue, Craig. 'Post-Apocalyptic Landscaping and Keeping Your Head Down: Tertiary Study Behind Bars', Crossfire (Deakin University Student Association Magazine) Issue 4, August 2004, Deakin University Geelong, Victoria p. 14.
- Minogue, Craig. 'The Use of a Military Level of Force on Civilian Prisoners: Strip Searching, Urine Testing, Cell Extractions and DNA Sampling in Victoria', Alternative Law Journal, Vol 30, No.4. August 2005, pp. 170–173.
- Minogue, Craig. 'Dealing with the Criminal Justice System: A Practical "How To" Handbook', Darebin Community Legal Centre Inc., October 2006.
- Minogue, Craig. 'Then and Now, Us and Them: A Historical Reflection on deaths in and out of Custody', Social Justice: A Journal of Crime, Conflict & World Order, Vol 33, No.4, 2006, 107–117.
