= Rupert Arnold =

Australian police commissioner (1904–1974)

Rupert Arnold CBE QPM JP
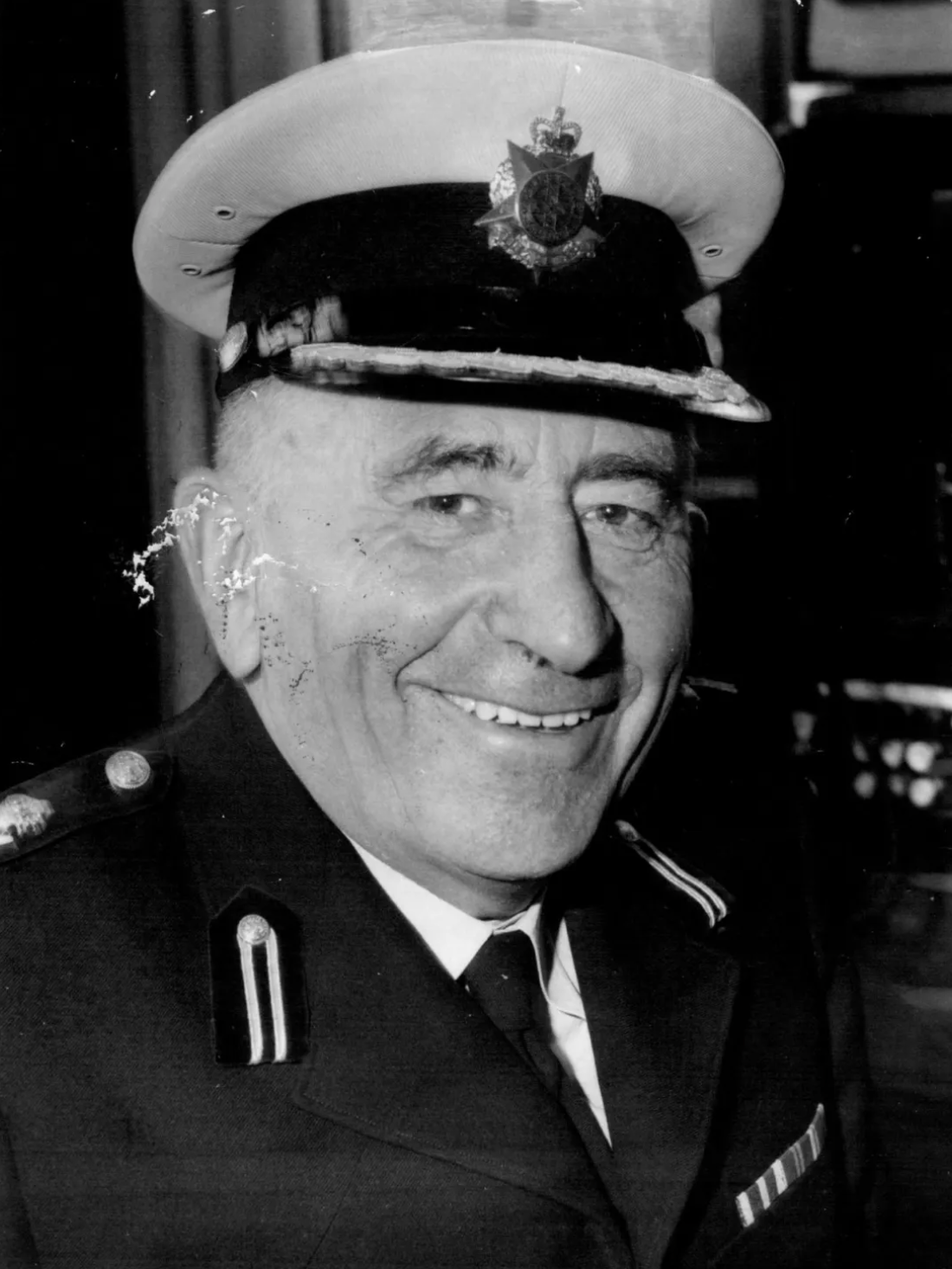

13th Chief Commissioner of Victoria Police
- In office 15 October 1963 – 1 February 1969
- Preceded by: Selwyn Porter
- Succeeded by: Noel Wilby

Personal details
- Born: Rupert Henry Arnold; 1 February 1904 Port Fairy, Victoria
- Died: 10 June 1974 (aged 70) Hampton Park, Victoria

Rupert Henry Arnold (1 February 1904 – 10 June 1974) served as a member of Victoria Police for 41 years and was appointed Chief Commissioner of Victoria Police serving from 1963 to 1969.

== Chief Commissioner of Victoria Police ==
During Arnold's time with Victoria Police, much change occurred with the mass uptake of motor vehicles. This meant that much of the police's resources shifted to dealing with traffic matters, monitoring roads, issuing licenses, and issuing vehicle registration.
