= Kel Glare =

Australian police officer

Kel Glare AO, APM

17th Chief Commissioner of Victoria Police
- In office 29 November 1987 – 28 November 1992
- Preceded by: Mick Miller
- Succeeded by: Neil Comrie

Personal details
- Born: Kelvin Glare; 6 January 1938 (age 88) Hopetoun, Victoria, Australia
- Occupation: Police officer

Kelvin Glare AO, APM (born 6 January 1938 in Hopetoun, Victoria) is a former Australian police officer, who was Chief Commissioner of Victoria Police from November 1987 to November 1992.

== Biography ==
Kelvin "Kel" Glare joined the Victoria Police on 10 May 1957, and transferred to the fingerprint section in January 1960. He became a detective in 1966 and, after studying law, became a lawyer in 1977. In 1981, he was promoted to chief inspector, then in 1984 to first assistant commissioner, and chief commissioner in 1987.

During his career, Glare was involved in investigating several highly publicised cases, including the Hoddle Street massacre. He was awarded the Australian Police Medal in 1987, the Order of St. John in 1990, and the Order of Australia in 1993.

After he retired, Glare worked for a security company and was employed by Argyle Diamonds to look into the case of stolen pink diamonds. He was unable to retrieve any pink diamonds from Europe but was involved in investigating how Western Australia Police had approached their theft, which culminated in a discussion of possible corrupt or criminal conduct by police at the Kennedy Royal Commission. He also worked for other consulting firms as well (in Papua New Guinea and the United States) and released his biography in 2015.

Police appointments
Preceded by Mick Miller	Chief Commissioner of Victoria Police; 1987–1992	Succeeded by Neil Comrie
