= Neil Comrie =

Australian police officer

Neil Comrie AO, APM

18th Chief Commissioner of Victoria Police
- In office 4 January 1993 – 9 March 2001
- Preceded by: Kel Glare
- Succeeded by: Christine Nixon

Personal details
- Born: Murray Neil Comrie; 10 March 1947 (age 79) Ballarat, Victoria, Australia
- Education: RMIT University; Deakin University
- Occupation: Police officer

Murray Neil Comrie AO, APM (born 10 March 1947 in Ballarat, Victoria), known as Neil Comrie, is a former Australian police officer. He was Chief Commissioner of Victoria Police from 1993 to 2001.

== Police career ==
Neil Comrie joined Victoria Police in 1967, continuing a family line of Victorian police officers including his father and grandfather. Working his way through the ranks, he succeeded in attaining several high-ranking positions in the Queensland Police Force. In 1980 Neil studied at the State College of Victoria at Coburg (which later became part of RMIT University) to complete an Associate Diploma in Criminal Justice Administration. Later he completed a Bachelor of Arts (Police Studies) degree at Deakin University. He was appointed Chief Commissioner of Victoria Police in 1993, succeeding Commissioner Kel Glare.

In May 2000, Comrie considered resigning after facing political pressure from police minister Andre Haermeyer to appoint assistant commissioner Noel Ashby to the vacant position of deputy commissioner, over Comrie's preferred candidate Peter Nancarrow. In December, Comrie announced his retirement from Victoria Police, two years before the end of his contract. Ashby and Nancarrow were considered, but a panel consisting of Premier Steve Bracks, Haermeyer and Lynne Kosky eventually unanimously selected Christine Nixon as his successor.

== Post-police career ==
In 2005, Comrie was appointed by the Commonwealth Ombudsman to investigate and report on the unlawful deportation of Australian citizen Vivian Solon to the Philippines. His report, "Inquiry into the Circumstances of the Vivian Alvarez Matter" was released in October, and was critical of the "catastrophic" handling of the case by the Department of Immigration.

In 2008, Comrie undertook a confidential review which identified "unacceptable risks" within the prison system due to an inability to process intelligence about threats to gangland prisoners. Although the head of the Justice Department, Penny Armytage, was "very concerned", by the 2010 prison death of Carl Williams only some of the 32 recommendations had been implemented.

In November 2009, Premier John Brumby announced that Comrie would be appointed to monitor the implementation of the recommendations of the Royal Commission into the Black Saturday bushfires.

Comrie was appointed President of the Metropolitan Fire Brigade board on 30 June 2010. He held this post until December 2014 before resigning and being replaced by Andi Diamond.

== Honours ==

Officer of the Order of Australia (AO)	12 June 2000	For service to the community as the Chief Commissioner of Police in Victoria, particularly through the development of strategies to address community safety issues, crime prevention measures and crime investigation.
Australian Police Medal (APM)	13 June 1994	
Officer of the Order of St John	6 February 1996	
National Medal	1982	
Australian Defence Medal		

Police appointments
Preceded by Kel Glare	Chief Commissioner of Victoria Police; 1993–2001	Succeeded by Christine Nixon
