= Reg Jackson =

Australian police officer

Reg Jackson CMG LVO QPM JP

15th Chief Commissioner of Victoria Police
- In office 12 October 1971 – 12 June 1977
- Preceded by: Noel Wilby
- Succeeded by: Mick Miller

Personal details
- Born: Reginald Jackson; 5 April 1913
- Died: 7 August 1989 (aged 76) Kew, Victoria, Australia
- Occupation: Police officer

Reginald Jackson (5 April 1913 – 5 August 1989) was an Australian police officer and Chief Commissioner of Victoria Police from 1971 to 1977.

== Police career ==
=== Early career ===
Jackson joined Victoria Police in 1934 and served for 44 years, including postings at Mildura, Malvern and South Melbourne as well as the Breaking Squad and the Stolen Motor Vehicle Squad. He was appointed Inspector in 1961 and made responsible for police public relations. In 1963 he was appointed Assistant Commissioner and in 1969 Deputy Commissioner. Jackson was also a part president and life member of the Police Association Victoria—the police union—Chairman of the Youth Advisory Panel and a member of the Police Superannuation Board.

=== Promotion to Chief Commissioner ===
On the retirement on the grounds of ill-health of Noel Wilby in 1971, Jackson was appointed Chief Commissioner at the age of 58. Jackson held the post until 1977 when he was replaced by Mick Miller. While Chief Commissioner, Jackson maintained his membership of the Police Association Victoria. He was responsible for the acquisition of the Victoria Police Academy at Glen Waverley.

Jackson was Chief Commissioner during the Beach Inquiry, established by the Victorian government to investigate corrupt behaviour by police officers relating to illegal abortion activity. The inquiry was unpopular with serving police officers and over 4,000 police officers met at Festival Hall to discuss possible strike action. Jackson addressed the meeting and urged officers to show restraint. At the end of his address, the officers unanimously passed a vote of confidence in Jackson as Chief Commissioner. The meeting put forward a series of demands that were accepted by the government and strike action was averted.

Jackson was described as a "Policeman's policeman" and "one of the most popular Chief Commissioners in the history of the Victoria Police force". He died in 1989 aged 75. Jackson was married with three daughters.

=== Controversy ===
At the Royal Commission into Institutional Responses to Child Sexual Abuse in 2015, Jackson's successor Mick Miller testified that he believed that Jackson, while Chief Commissioner, was part of a criminal conspiracy to obstruct an investigation into child sex offences allegedly committed in 1971 in Mildura by Monsignor John Day.

== Honours and awards ==

| Companion of the Order of St Michael and St George (CMG) | 12 June 1976 | For services Chief Commissioner, Victoria Police. |
| Lieutenant of the Royal Victorian Order (LVO) | 5 August 1977 | For service as Commissioner of the Victoria Police during the 1977 Royal Visit. Originally appointed as a member fourth class. Re-classified as Lieutenant in 1984. |
| Officer of the Order of St John | 26 February 1976 | |
| Queens Police Medal (QPM) | 24 February 1970 | For distinguished service. Deputy Commissioner, Victoria Police Force. |
| Queen Elizabeth II Silver Jubilee Medal | 1 August 1977 | |
| National Medal | 25 January 1982 | |
| Police Long Service and Good Conduct Medal | 1956 | |

Police appointments
| Preceded by Noel Wilby | Chief Commissioner of Victoria Police; 1971–1977 | Succeeded by Mick Miller |
