= Mick Miller (police officer) =

Australian police officer (1926–2019)

Mick Miller AO, LVO, QPM

16th Chief Commissioner of Victoria Police
- In office 13 June 1977 – 28 November 1987
- Monarch: Elizabeth II
- Governor: Sir Henry Winneke; Sir Brian Murray; Davis McCaughey
- Preceded by: Reginald Jackson
- Succeeded by: Kel Glare

Personal details
- Born: Sinclair Imrie Miller; 13 October 1926 Flemington, Victoria, Australia
- Died: 6 August 2019 (aged 92) Melbourne, Victoria, Australia
- Occupation: Police Commissioner

Sinclair Imrie Miller AO LVO QPM (13 October 1926 – 6 August 2019), known as Mick Miller, was an Australian police officer. Miller served as Chief Commissioner of Victoria Police—the police force of the Australian state of Victoria—from 1977 to 1987.

While Chief Commissioner, Miller introduced initiatives such as the air wing, task force policing and the Special Operations Group. Miller also integrated women into the police force by placing them on the general seniority list, thus giving them enhanced career opportunities.

Earlier in his career, Miller was appointed to lead the Gaming Branch in an operation against illegal SP bookmaking operations that had encouraged corruption both in the police force and the Postmaster-General's Department. Miller was the first Australian police officer to graduate from the FBI Academy and was awarded a Churchill Fellowship.

== Honours and awards ==

Officer of the Order of Australia (AO)	9 June 1986	Queen's Birthday Honours “For public service, particularly with the Victoria Police Force."
Lieutenant of the Royal Victorian Order (LVO)	2 October 1981	For service as Commissioner of the Victoria Police during the 1981 royal visit for CHOGM. Originally appointed as a member fourth class. Re-classified as Lieutenant in 1984.
Commander of the Order of St John	30 January 1986	Originally appointed as a Serving Brother in 1975 and then promoted to Officer in 1981.
Queens Police Medal (QPM)	1 January 1971	New Year Honours "For distinguished service" while at the rank of Sergeant.
War Medal 1939-45	1946	
Australian Service Medal 1939-45	1946	
Australian Service Medal 1945-1975	1995	With JAPAN clasp.
National Police Service Medal	2010	
Queen Elizabeth II Silver Jubilee Medal	1 August 1977	
Australian Sports Medal	27 February 2001	For work with the AFL Foundation and as patron of the Recreation Link (Reclink) Football League and the Football Integration Development Association.
National Medal	25 January 1982	
Australian Defence Medal	2007	
Police Long Service and Good Conduct Medal	1969	
Knight of the Order of Merit of the Italian Republic Cavaliere Ordine al Merito della Repubblica Italiana	2 June 2001	For contribution to the Italian community in Victoria, particularly from the 1950s through to the 1970s.

== Personal life ==
Miller attended Melbourne High School in 1940 and 1941. He enlisted in the Australian Army in January 1945 and served in World War Two. He also served in the 1st Armoured Car Squadron in the occupation of Japan.

Miller died in 2019. He was married to Beverley Smith for 55 years, with whom he had three children.

Police appointments
Preceded by Reginald Jackson	Chief Commissioner of Victoria Police; 1977–1987	Succeeded by Kel Glare
