= Vehicle registration plates of Victoria =

Victoria, Australia vehicle license plates

The Australian state of Victoria requires its residents to register their motor vehicles and display vehicle registration plates. Current regular issue plates are to the standard Australian dimensions of 372 mm (14.6 in) in length by 134 mm (5.3 in) in height, but Victoria has used its own serial dies since 1977.

== Issuing authorities ==
- Victoria Police: originally (Motor Car Act 1909, Motor Car Act 1915, Motor Car Act 1928, Motor Car Act 1930, Motor Car Act 1951, Motor Car Act 1958)
- Transport Regulation Board: 1980 to 1982 (Motor Registration Act 1980, Motor Car (Registration and Drivers' Licences) Act 1982)
- Road Traffic Authority: 1982–1989
- VicRoads: 1989–present

== Previous general series ==
Cars

- 1910–1939: nnn·nnn - Numerals only, not letters.
- 1939–1953: AB·nnn – AA-000 to ZZ-999, I and Q are not issued.
- 1953–1977: GAB·nnn – GAA-000 to LZZ-999, I and Q are not issued until the I series plates
- 1977–1994: ABC-nnn – AAA-000 to FZZ-999; RAA-000 to RBZ-999
- 1994–2013: NAB-nnn – NAA-000 to QZZ-999; RCA-000 to UZZ-999; WAA-000 to ZZZ-999

Trailers

- 1910–1930: nnn·nnn
- 1930–1963: Tnn·nnn – T-1 to T31-999
- 1963–1977: Tnn·nnn – G00-000 to M36-999
- 1977–1994: Tnn-nnn – A00-000 to E55-999
- 1994–2022: Tnn-nnn – E56-000 to Z99-999 then reissues from B00-000 to D99-999

Motorcycles

- 1910–1953: nn·nnn
- 1953–1977: AB·nnn – AA-000 to DZ-999; GA-000 to HZ-999; JA-000 to LZ-999
- 1977–1994: AB-nnn – MA-000 to PZ-999; RA-000 to WO-999
- 1994–2010: AB-nnn – WP-000 to ZZ-999; AA-000 to JZ-999

Registration plates have been issued in Victoria since 1910. Like other Australian plates, these are usually particular to a vehicle, changing hands with it, and are generally permanent (yearly registration is required, however). Victorian registration plates are manufactured at Hopkins Correctional Centre in Ararat, Victoria.

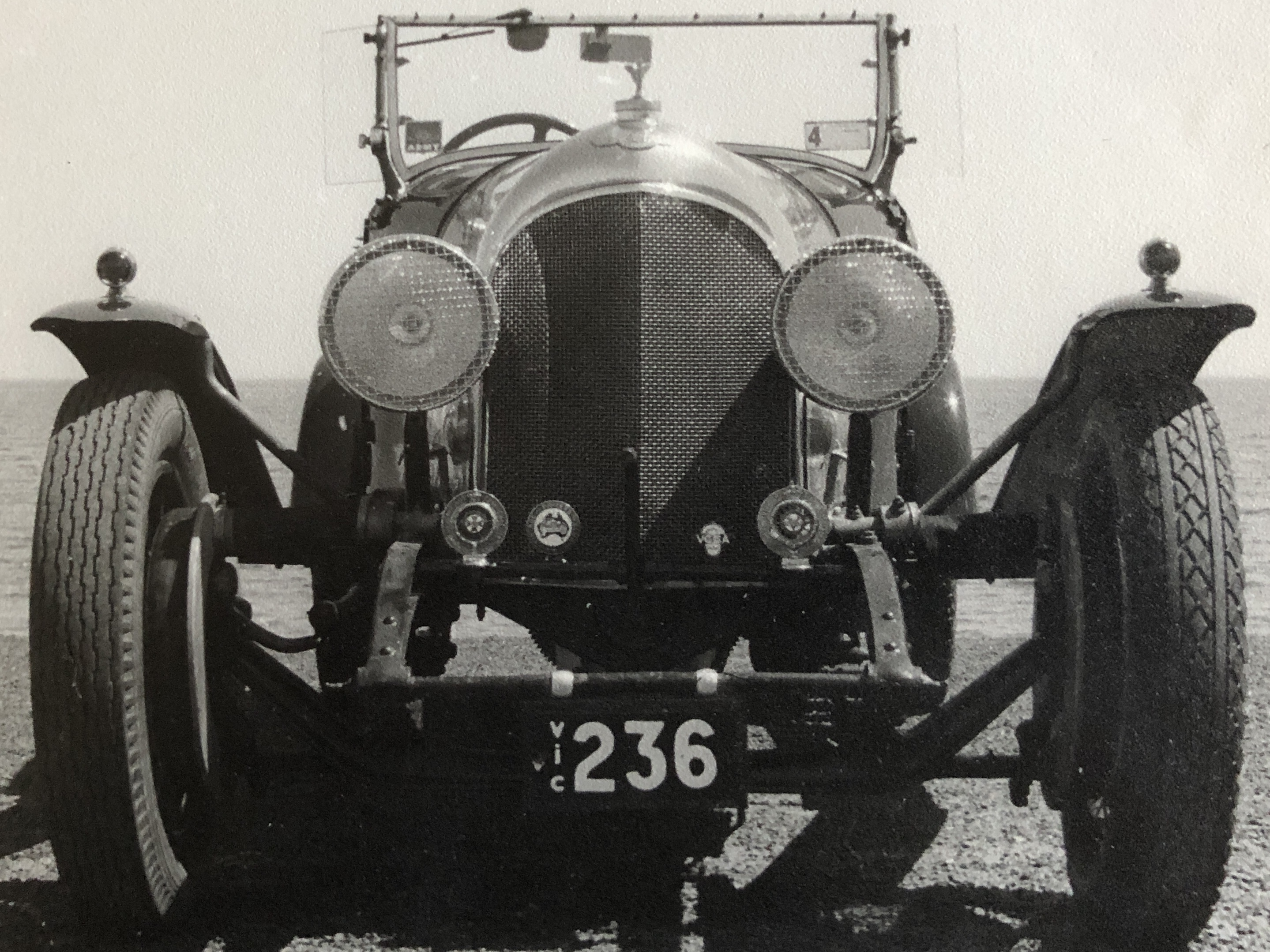
Example of Victorian car registration (1910-1939)

Initial Victorian plates, issued from 1910 to 1939, were in numerals only, from 1 to 285-000. From 1930, "Vic" inserts were added vertically down the left-hand side of the plate.

(1) Every motor car shall be registered by the Chief Commissioner [of Police] who shall keep a register and shall assign a separate identifying number to every car so registered and shall enter in the register every such number and such other particulars as are required by this Act or the regulations thereunder.

(2) The identifying number of each car shall be fixed and kept fixed on the car or on a vehicle drawn by the car or on both as may be prescribed.

— Section 4, Motor Car Act 1909

In 1939, Victoria switched to a two-letter, three-number scheme (AA-000 to ZZ-999) of which also bear "Vic" down the left-hand side. This format was later used for motorcycles. In 1972, the two-letter, three-number scheme was reintroduced as an optional, personalised plate style for cars. These had an embossed "Vic" above the plate's embossed characters in full length.

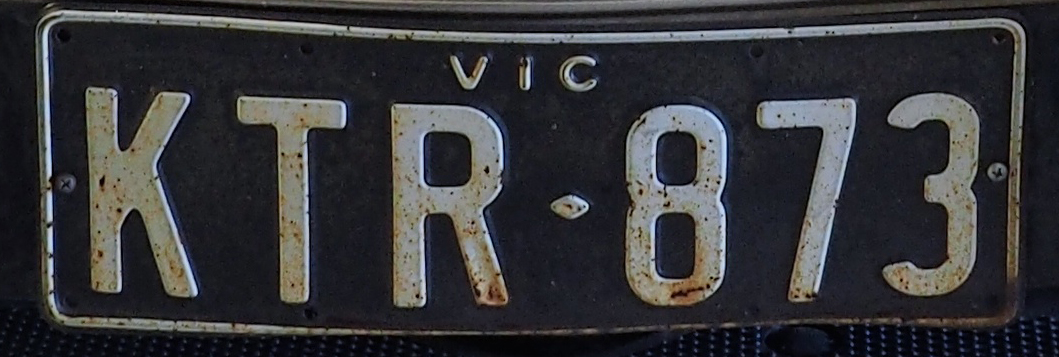
Victoria (1952–1977)

From January 1953, owing to the Federal number plate system, Victorian plates switched to the three-letter, three-number standard: GAA-000 to HZZ-999, and JAA-000 to LZZ-999, coloured white lettering on a black background, and a "Vic" insert on the top of the plate. The first three-lettered plate, GAA-000 was issued on 27 January 1953. The letters "I" and "Q" were not issued in any combinations, due to these being easily mistaken for "1" and "O" or "0". For the same reason, In 1964, Victoria skipped the I-prefix series and went straight from HZZ-999 to JAA-000. However, having reached the end of their Federal allotment of letters, Victoria in 1974 commenced from LZZ-999 to IAA-000 (in some later plate sequences, the capital I had noticeable staves to tell them apart from the number 1. The earlier sequences did not, due to the I-series plates being made by two different manufacturers, who used different dies for the "I"). This was only a temporary measure, naturally, as Victoria faced the same problem having proceeded through the I-series three years later.

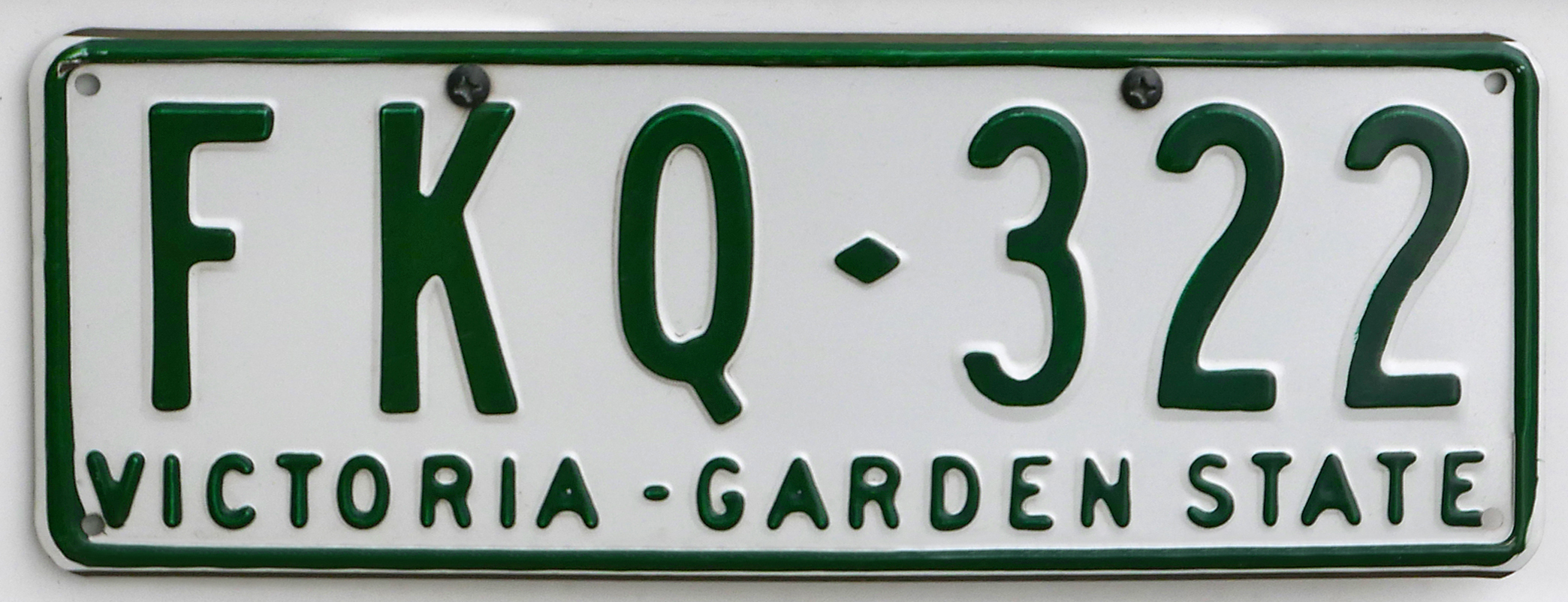
Victoria – Garden State (1977–1994)

Having exhausted the I-series plates, in November 1977, reflective green-on-white plates were introduced, beginning at AAA-000 and running to FZZ-999, and then skipping to a brief run of RAA-000 to RBZ-999 in 1994 (free issued as a replacement for defective A and B series plates), bearing the slogan Victoria – Garden State at the bottom of the plate initiated by premier Rupert Hamer. In the early 1990s, it was discovered that the reflective properties of many registration plates in the range from AAA-000 to EZZ-999, and principally the C-series, were defective and this had coincided with the rapid introduction of traffic enforcement cameras in Victoria. Due to the number of plates which were unidentifiable in photographs, all defective plates were recalled and new plates issued free of charge. This caused the rapid consumption of the plate stocks especially late in the F-series and some plates (those were starting with FVA-000 to FVZ-999 and FYA-000 to FYZ-999) were produced in Queensland to meet demand. These plates are identifiable by their different embossed dies and vertical diamond separator (as opposed to Victoria's horizontal diamond). It is a popular myth that the defective paint was caused by prisoners manufacturing the plates urinating in the paint mixture.

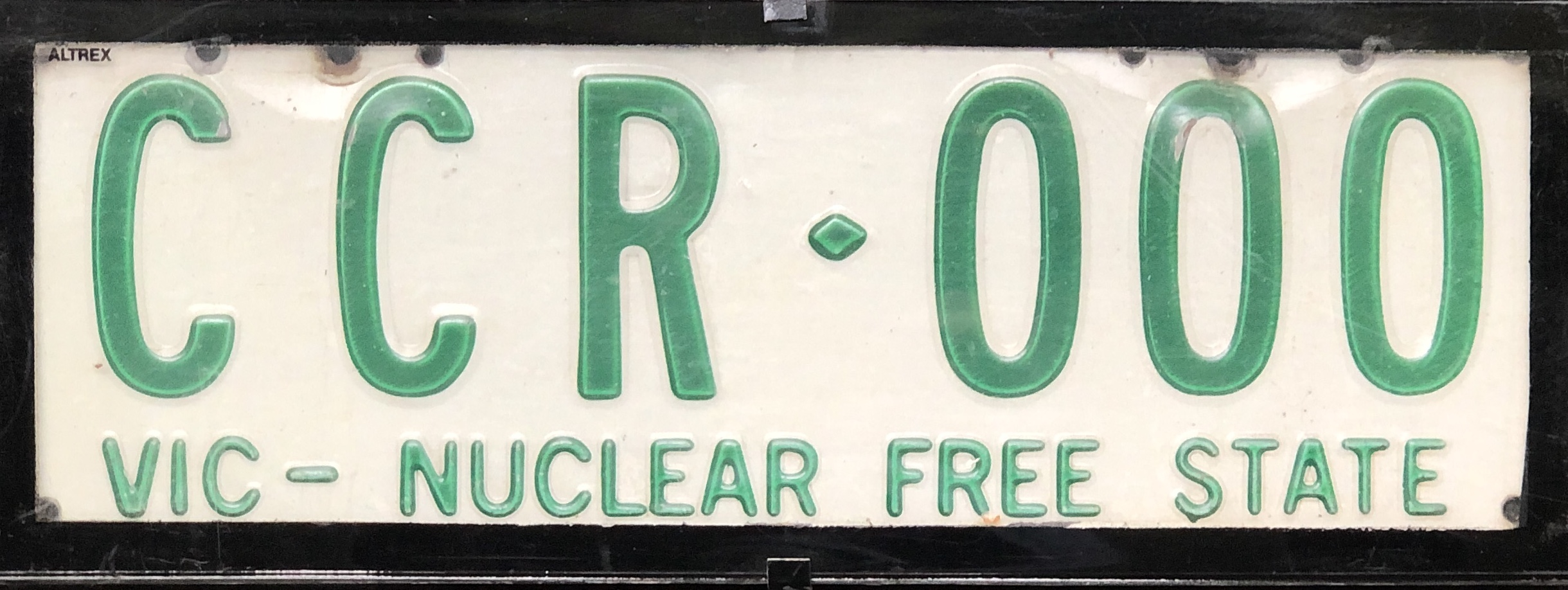
Vic - Nuclear Free State (1985)

To commemorate the 150th anniversary of European settlement in Victoria, plates from late 1984 to 1985 bore the slogan Victoria – 150 Years across the bottom. These plates were issued for the CBK-000 to CDZ-999 range and were the same green colour. In 1985, some of the CGI-000 to CGQ-999 or CGZ-999 series plates bore the slogan Vic – Nuclear Free State across the bottom, also in green initiated by John Cain the premier at the time. The Vic - Nuclear Free State slogan was also available on some ordered plates in 1985. For the Australian Bicentenary in 1988, plates in the DJE-000 to DRZ-999 range bore the "Vic" insert vertically down the left-hand side and the slogan Australia 1788 – 1988 in green across the bottom. In 1992, the EWA-000 to EYF-999 plates were produced with the slogan Victoria – Drive Safely across the bottom in green.

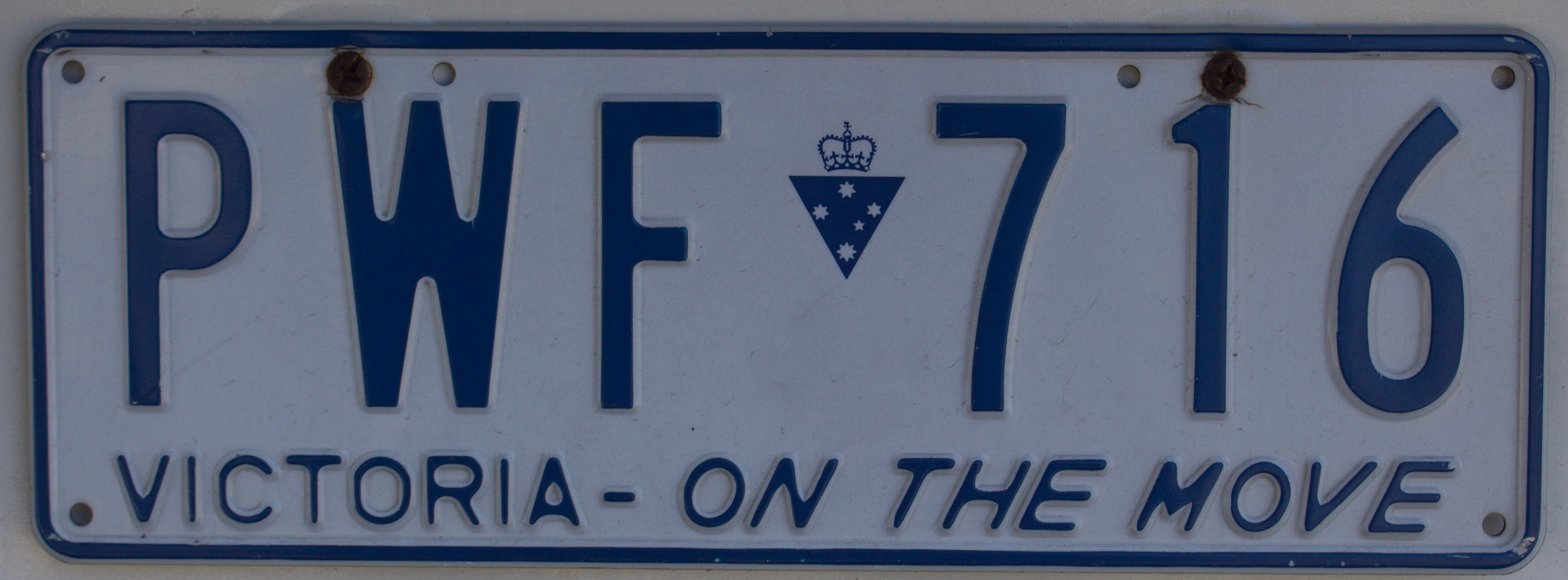
Victoria – On the Move (1994–2000)

In September 1994, in an initiative by Liberal Premier, Jeff Kennett, reflective blue-on-white plates were introduced, beginning at NAA-000 and ending at QDQ-999. The diamond-dot in the middle was changed to the state logo of a blue St Edward's Crown over an upside-down blue triangle with the Victorian Southern Cross in white inside. These plates bore the slogan Victoria – On the Move across the bottom. In 1996, shorter slimline plates which bear the "Vic" insert vertically down the left-hand-side, and use a different font were issued. These are usually the same width as regular plates and were offered as remakes of existing plates in either blue or green on white, all with the Victoria – On the Move slogan. Unlike slimline or premium plates used in other states, Victorian premium plates follow the same numbering as standard plates, meaning a slimline plate can be matched with a full-sized equivalent.

After the Labor Party headed by Steve Bracks was elected at the September 1999 state election, the Premier by press release on 4 January 2000 announced a public campaign to choose a new slogan that ended on 21 January. This was done because of the affiliation of the old design and slogan to previous government. The old state logo and motto were phased out in February 2000 to prepare for the introduction of a new one. Until the new design was finalised, interim plates in the QDR-000 to QNF-999 series reverted to the old diamond-dot with just Victoria stated across the bottom (for the regular size) and "Vic" vertically printed on the left-hand side for the slimline design.

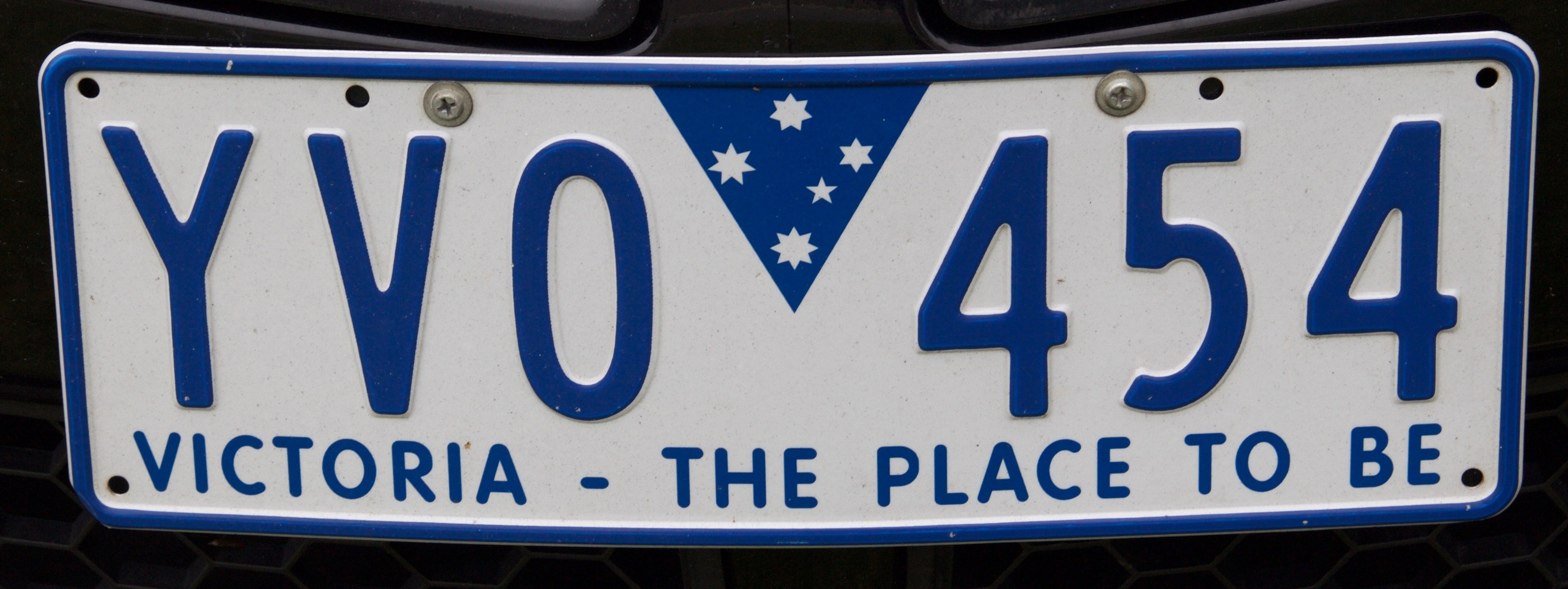
Victoria – The Place to Be (2000–2013)

On 18 May 2000, Bracks announced the winning slogan to be Victoria – The Place to Be, as nominated by three contestants. This was controversial as it was later learned that the government had paid an advertising firm associated with the Labor Party A$87,000 to assist with the slogan and updated plate design despite it being presented as a public competition. The first plates were issued on 17 October 2000 to the three winning entrants. Starting with QNG-000, these plates dispensed with the diamond-dot separator for the new state logo—an enlarged blue triangle containing the Victorian Southern Cross—the top of which merging with the upper border of the plate. The slimline version retained the previous interim design, which remains the current style.

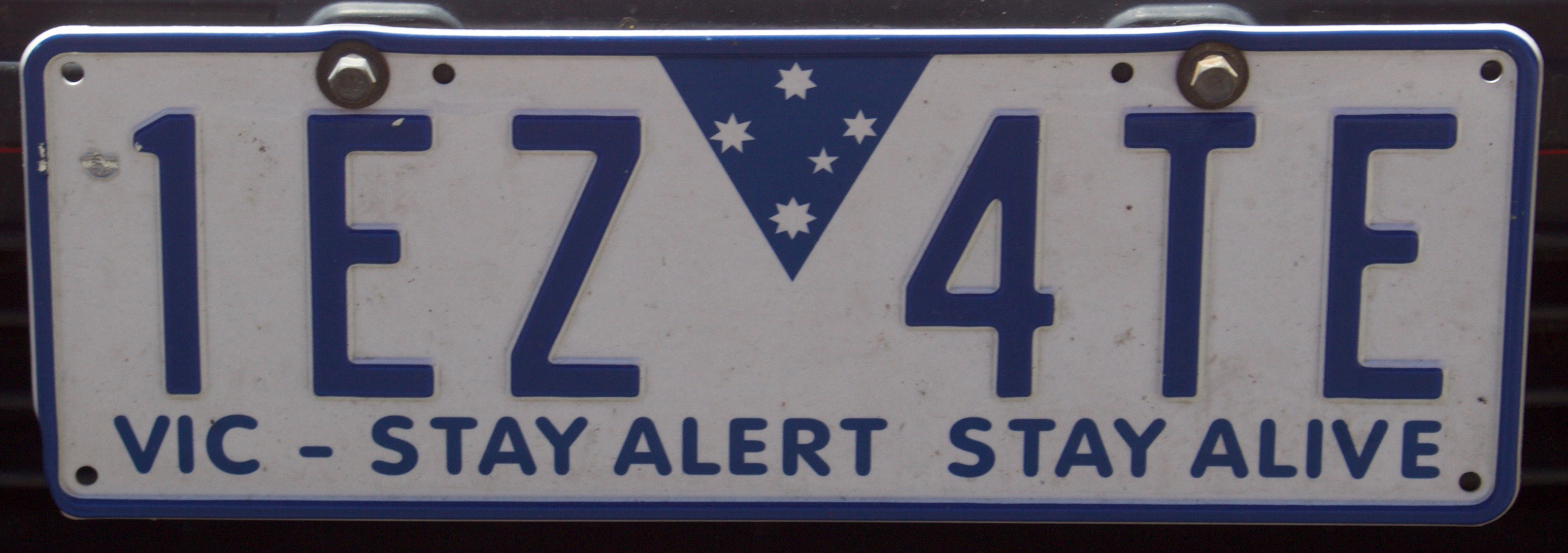
Vic – Stay Alert Stay Alive (2013–2015)

In December 2010 the new Ted Baillieu Liberal government announced its intent to drop the slogan The Place to Be from the regular sized plates. On 10 June 2013 the Victorian government announced that the current series was exhausted with the final plate ZZZ-999 already purchased.

== Current general series ==
For information regarding skipped combinations please refer to Skipped Combinations section

- Vehicles: 2GJ-1AA EHC·nnn
- Trailers: 700-00E
- Motorcycles: 3K-1AA

The new series utilises the format naa-naa starting from 1AA-1AA and was launched on 19 August 2013 using the slogan Vic – Stay Alert Stay Alive. The new format is estimated to last for 50 years. During the transitional period, Z-series stocks will still be available for motorists who lose or damage their plates, while the new series will be for general everyday issue. This combination with four separate sequences (one number, two letters, one number, two letters) is one of the most complex structure adopted for a vehicle registration plate around the world. It has also been suggested that the "1" at the front of the combination followed by two letters might be confused with "I", for example, making 1CE look like ICE. Another issue with the new series is that the letter "O" and the number "0" are the same shape in the font used on Victorian plates, so the combination ending in "4OW" for example, is more likely to be read as "40W". This mistake was less likely to be made on the older series as the letters and numbers were isolated by a separator. Progression: 1AA-1AA, 1AA-2AA...1AA-9AA, 1AA-1AB...1AA-9AZ, 1AA-1BA...1AA-9ZZ, 1AB-1AA...1AZ-9ZZ, 1BA-1AA...1ZZ-9ZZ, 2AA-1AA...9ZZ-9ZZ.

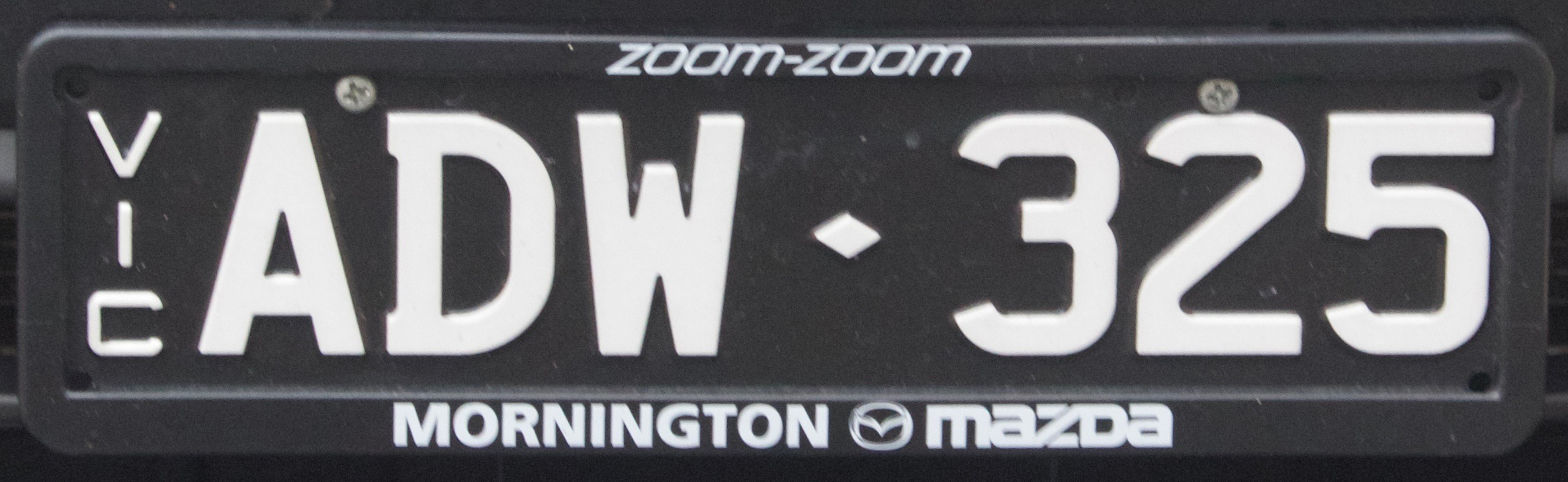
Slimline black registration plate (2013–present)

The older aaa-nnn combinations have been reissued to the public and dealers as a reflective white on black slimline on a limited but now expanded scale since June 2013 as demand for more white on black slimline plates grows. The plates were reissued from AAA-000, skipping those that are still in active registration. Particular serial combinations is manufactured then, customers receive them off the box at VicRoads service centres. As of May 2026, this numbering scheme has reached the EBA-000 combination.

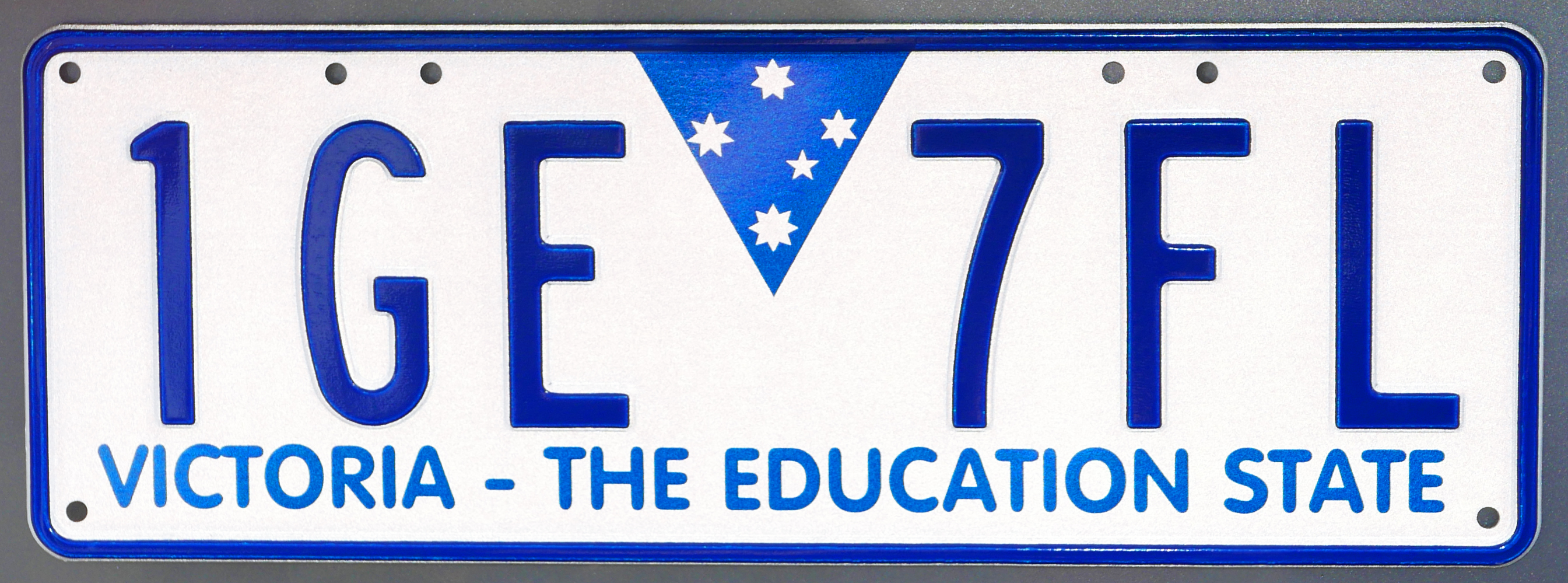
Victoria – The Education State (2015–2016)

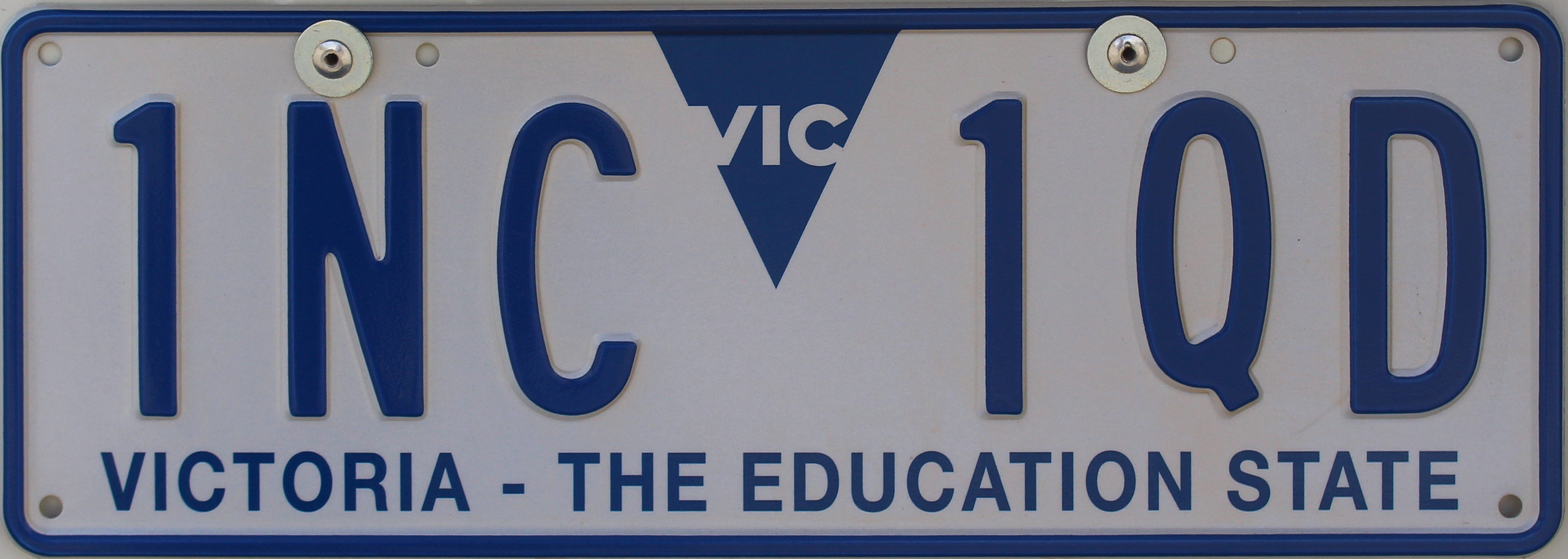
Victoria – The Education State (2016–present)

As part of Labor's campaign for the November 2014 state election, the Daniel Andrews-led party announced its intention if winning office to replace the Vic – Stay Alert Stay Alive with the slogan Victoria – The Education State. After winning this election, the Andrews government honoured this pledge, with the new plates released on 16 October 2015, starting at 1GA-1AA. Unlike previous combinations, the "1G" combination was only produced in standard dimensions with the Victoria – The Education State slogan. Slimline plates continued under the "1F" series. In circa February 2016, the slimline plates progressed to the "1I" series, skipping "1H" which was allocated to the standard size plates from circa March 2016. Once VicRoads exhausted the "1H" combinations in early August 2016, the standard size plates recommenced from "1IE" onwards (with 1IA to 1ID used for slim plates). Starting 1 September 2016, plates bearing the new Victorian state logo replaced the previous Southern Cross design starting at combination 1IL-1AA. The Victorian government had earlier unveiled this logo on 12 August 2015. As of 31 December 2022, all plates are now manufactured with holograms as an extra security measure.

== Allocated series ==
General issue combinations at the start of each year (cars and trucks)
1960	1961	1962	1963	1964	1965	1966	1967	1968	1969
HCK-620	HHK-501	HMG-525	HSH-114	HXU-733	JDS-007	JKH-768	JRD-884	JXE-287	KEB-500
1970	1971	1972	1973	1974	1975	1976	1977	1978	1979
KMD-422	KUC-214	LBD-967	LKC-042	LTE-459	IBU-000	IJD-445	ITA-643	ABF-325	AJL-467
1980	1981	1982	1983	1984	1985	1986	1987	1988	1989
ARN-000	AZL-000	BGS-000	BPY-000	BYM-000	CBX-931	CSG-007	DAV-000	DGE-555	DRS-002
1990	1991	1992	1993	1994	1995	1996	1997	1998	1999
ECT-525	EMH-000	EUB-000	FCJ-400	FLR-000	NEI-000	NRA-000	OET-650	OUU-000	PLH-000
2000	2001	2002	2003	2004	2005	2006	2007	2008	2009
QAA-000	QSA-000	RLA-000	SCZ-999	SRR-989	TIM-959	TZH-877	UPG-951	WFK-999	WYA-000
2010	2011	2012	2013	2014	2015	2016	2017	2018	2019
XRA-000	YIA-000	ZAA-000	ZSA-000	1BA-1AA	1DX-6UF	1GP-4AA	1JI-1AA	1LC-1AA	1ON-1AA
			AAA-000	ABA-000	AEA-000	AHA-000	AMB-000	ASA-000	AYV-000
2020	2021	2022	2023	2024	2025	2026			
1RC-1AA	1TD-1AA	1VI-1AA	1XF-1AA	1ZI-1AA	2BR-1AA	2EE-1AA			
BFN-000	BLO-000	BVJ-000	CFT-000	CUG-000	DJA-000	DYA-000			

== Slimline allocations and combination skipping ==
Slimline combinations: 1AA-1BA - 1AB-9ZZ, 1AN-1AA - 1AO-9ZZ, 1BA-1AA - 1BD-9ZZ, 1CA-1AA - 1CF-9ZZ, 1DA-1AA - 1DF-9ZZ, 1FA-1AA - 1FC-9ZZ, 1FX-1AA - 1FZ-9ZZ, 1IA-1AA - 1ID-9ZZ, 1JA-1AA - 1JD-9ZZ, 1KA-1AA - 1KB-9ZZ, 1MA-1AA - 1MC-9ZZ, 1NA-1AA - 1NB-9ZZ, 1PA-1AA - 1PA-9ZZ, 1QA-1AA - 1QA-9ZZ, 1RA-1AA - 1RB-9ZZ, 1SA-1AA - 1SB-9ZZ, 1TA-1AA - 1TB-9ZZ, 1UA-1AA - 1UB-9ZZ, 1VA-1AA - 1VA-9ZZ, 1ZA-1AA - 1ZA-9ZZ, 2AT-1AA - 2AT-9ZZ

Skipped combinations

1939–1953: AB-123, AI-000 to AI-999, AQ-000 to AQ-999, BI-000 to BI-999, BQ-000 to BQ-999 up to ZI-000 to ZI-999, ZQ-000 to ZQ-999, IA-000 to IZ-999 and QA-000 to QZ-999, I and Q are not issued.

1953–current: ABC-123, ASS-000 to ASS-999 (Premium plates), BUM-000 to BUM-999, FUC-000 to FUC-999, FUK-000 to FUK-999, GAI-000 to GAI-999, GAQ-000 to GAQ-999, GBI-000 to GBI-999, GBQ-000 to GBQ-999 up to LZI-000 to LZI-999, LZQ-000 to LZQ-999, GIA-000 to GIZ-999, GQA-000 to GQZ-999, HIA-000 to HIZ-999, HQA-000 to HQZ-999 up to LIA-000 to LIZ-999, LQA-000 to LQZ-999 (All except IAA-000 to IZZ-999 + I & Q combinations were issued from 1977, starting with AAI-000), ISA-000 to ISZ-999, MVV-000 to MVZ-999, MZQ-000 to MZQ-999, NIG-000 to NIG-999, NSW-000 to NSW-999, OII-000 to OII-999, OIO-000 to OIO-999, OOI-000 to OOI-999, OOO-000 to OOO-999, PIG-000 to PIG-999, PIS-000 to PIS-999, POX-000 to POX-999, SES-000 to SES-999, SEX-000 to SEX-999, SNE-000 to SNE-999, SPV-000 to SPV-999, SQE-000 to SQE-999, SUX-000 to SUX-999, TIT-000 to TIT-999, TJX-000 to TJZ-999, TKP-277 to TKZ-999, UPU-000 to UPU-999 (VBC-000 to VGZ-999 and VIA-000 to VZZ-999 reserved for "Euro plates"), WOG-000 to WOG-999.

2013–current: 1AB-2CD - 1CU-(1-9)NT, 1FU-(1-9)CK, 1II-(1-9)II, 1KI-(1-9)LL, 1OO-(1-9)OO, 1RA-(1-9)PE, 1SH-(1-9)IT, 2CU-(1-9)NT, 2FU-(1-9)CK.

2010–current Motorcycles: 1A-2BC – 1F-(1-9)CK, 1I-(1-9)II, 1O-(1-9)OO, 2F-(1-9)CK, 2I-(1-9)II, 2O-(1-9)OO, 3F-(1-9)CK.

1963-current Trailers: A12-345 - I00-000 to I99-999, M37-000 to M99-999, O00-000 to O99-999, A00-000 to A99-999 (reissue run set a side for special trailer issues as general series reissues started at B00-000 since 2018, skipping those that are still in active registration).

2020-current - General series ahead are now allowed outside current series allocations for light vehicles up to 9ZZ-9ZZ and motorbikes 9Z-9ZZ

== Personalised plates ==
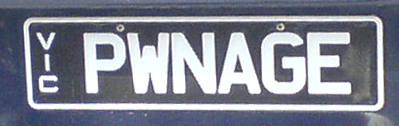
A custom vanity plate (this example shows a slimline white-on-black plate)

Format options (in any colour): a, aa, aaa, aaaa, aaaaa, aaaaaa, a-n,a-nn, aa-n, aa-nn, aa-nnn, aa-nnnn, aaa-n, aaa-nn, aaaa-n, aaaa-nn, aaaaa-n, nnn-nnn, ccc–ccc, n-aaaaa, nn-aaaa, n-aaaa, nn-aaa, nnn-aaa, n-aaa, nnn-aa, nnnn-aa, nn-aa, n-aa, n-a, and the number series 300-000 to 999-999 (285-001 to 299-999 was never issued). The 100 to 285-000 range is reserved for the exclusive, handmade "Heritage" series plates. Three (100-999), four (1000-9999) and five-digit (10000-99999) combinations can only be purchased via public auction.

There are a number of custom plate options in Victoria, issued by V Plates on behalf of VicRoads. Custom or personalised plates come with the optional purchase of a contract. This contract allows the plate holder to retain the plates whether on a vehicle or not. Holding a contract on certain plates, means that when the plates are no longer registered they cannot be resold/issued to another person unless the contract holder sells the contract. VicRoads (who own V Plates) do not know the cumulative figure of the total number of custom registration plates sold since they were first launched in 1986. This is because many personalised plates are not on vehicles, or they are held on self-retention, or have been handed back to VicRoads. However, VicRoads do know that around 30,000 sets of custom registration plates are made every year, and they estimate 10 percent of registered vehicles have custom registration plates.

Sometimes car importers or dealerships reserve a range of plates to put on their cars, the contracts for which are often sold on to customers with the purchase of a car. For example, Subaru bought STI-000 to STI-999 and WRX-000 to WRX-999 for their Subaru Impreza WRX and STI models.

Victorian Euro plate

There are two types of plates, (standard and mini) designed specifically to look like European registration plates, called Euro plates. The standard Euro plates, introduced in 2005 are 520 millimetres (20.5 in) wide and 112 millimetres (4.4 in) high and the mini ones are 372 millimetres (14.6 in) wide and 100 millimetres (3.9 in) high. Euro plates have a blue section to the left containing "Vic" vertically above a Victorian Southern Cross, and in the main section contain the letter "V", a full-coloured Victorian coat of arms, and two letters, a space and three numbers (V aa-nnn). These plates use the FE-Schrift font and look like German plates. The general series range from VAA-000 to VZZ-999 are reserved for Euro plates. As of 1 January 2019, the crest was changed to a new design, incorporating the state bird emblem, the Helmeted Honeyeater and the state animal emblem, Leadbeaters Possum as supporters and the latin motto 'salvum itineribus' meaning 'safe travels'. The change was due to the Victorian government not allowing the state's coat of arms to be used on commercial products.

In 2006, to commemorate the 2006 Commonwealth Games being held in Melbourne, VicRoads offered a limited edition of 1,000 series of plates in the format M06-nnn. These had the slogan Melbourne 2006 and featured a red-tailed black cockatoo (the official mascot of the 2006 Commonwealth Games). The proceeds were donated to the Department of Sustainability to raise funds to preserve this bird.

All official vehicles actually used in the Commonwealth Games were supplied by Toyota Australia and used general issue XAA-nnn plates. The following year, VicRoads issued a similar limited edition Penny the Penguin series in the format M07-nnn, to commemorate the 2007 FINA Swimming World Cup. In 2008, AFL Premiership plates were released. The Hawthorn Football Club won the premiership in that year and hence the registration plate format was HH-08-aa (HH for Hawthorn Hawks, and 08 designating the year they won the premiership). The customer was able to choose the last two characters. The plate was brown on reflective white and featured a watermark of the club's logo in the centre of the plate.

Recently some prestige plates have been issued, which consist of four numbers or two groups of three numbers. Plates using the format B-nnnnn has been released for vehicles registered in Bendigo (B-0001 to B-4999) and Ballarat (B-5001 to B-9999). These have a customised insert of their town, and are usually blue lettering on a reflective yellow background; slogans vary. Since 1993, those also registered to horse studs across Victoria can reserve a V-nnnn series, usually brown lettering on a yellow background and stating Victorian Thoroughbred as a slogan. Others are designed after football teams, and a limited edition Grand Prix series (GP-001 to GP-999) was authorised when Melbourne first hosted the Australian Grand Prix in 1996. Slimline editions of these plates have also been produced.

In July 2014, the old general issue Garden State and On the Move slogans have been reintroduced as a "Retro" option. The plates come in green for "Victoria – Garden State" starting from AAA-000 to FZZ-999 (though some black slimline plates also use that combination), plus RAA-000 to RBZ-999, and Victoria – On the Move in blue on reflective white bases starting from NAA-000 to QDZ-999. These are produced in screen-printed slogans (rather than embossed when they were originally issued) and all features are only an approximation of the original dyes.

== Other vehicles ==
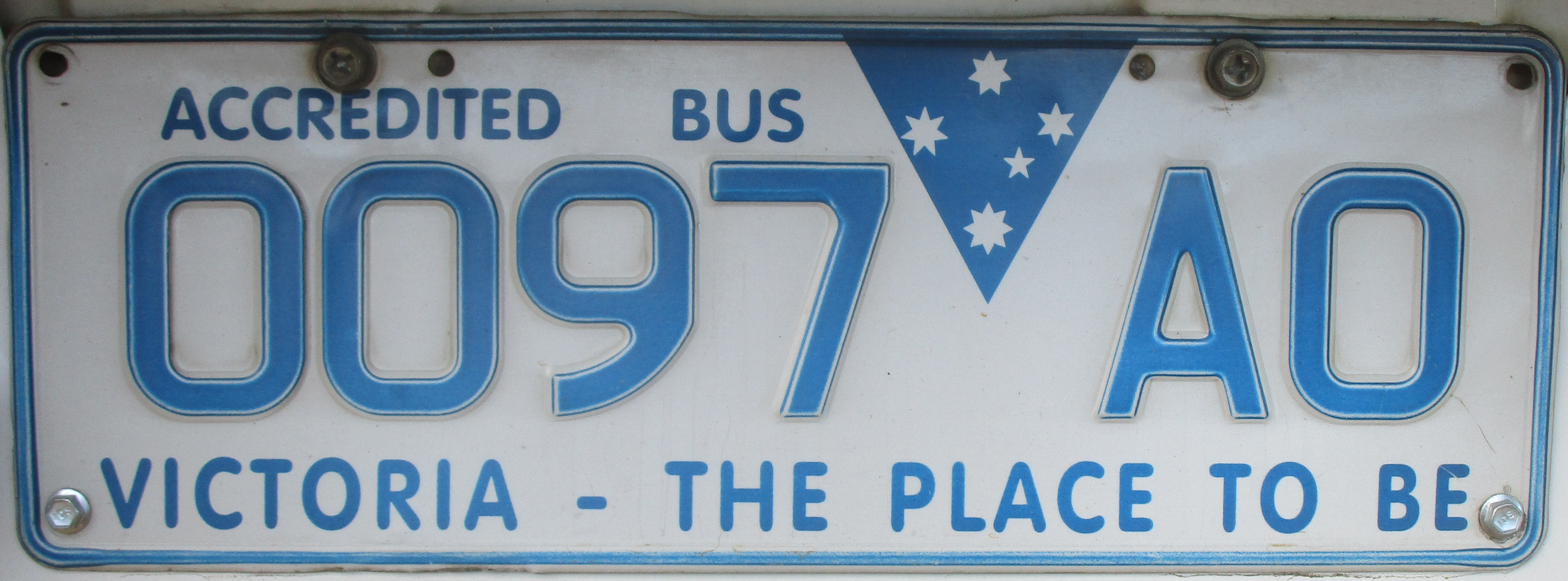
Accredited Operator (bus)

Non-Commercial (bus)

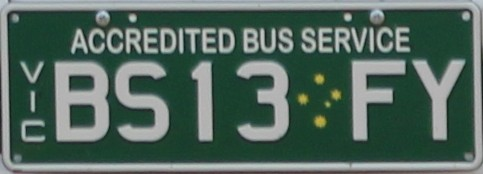
Accredited Bus Service

- Trucks and other heavy vehicles: are also given standard issued plates (i.e. the same as cars). Until 1987, trucks had the interstate black on white series from IS-0000 to IU-6999 and was replaced by the now obsolete Federal Interstate Registration Scheme.
- Buses, coaches and commercially owned or run mini-buses: bear plates using a four-number, two-letter (nnnn-aa) format. Between 2001 and 2013, these suffixes were AO, AC, SO or NC, depending under which registration they fall under (accredited operator, accredited charter, school operator and non-commercial). Special issue registration plates of "Accredited Bus Service" may only be issued to buses operated by persons who have been granted bus operator accreditation by the Director Bus Safety, Transport Safety Victoria (TSV) to operate bus services. As of December 2013, the AO series ran out at 9999-AO and as a result a replacement series was launched BS12-AB in white on green "Accredited Bus Service" at the top the "Vic" embossed vertically on the right and the number/alpha sequence in white stamped slimline dies, with the Southern Cross in yellow as the separator as Victorian taxis. AC, SO and NC plates can continue to be displayed until the bus retires from service and these suffixes will not be allowed to be reallocated to another bus. Hence, AO or BS plates are the only current bus series authorised by the Transport Safety Victoria's Safety Director. Previously, the style usually bear the usual state logo, with "Accredited Bus" across the top and the Victoria – The Place to Be across the bottom. Until 2000, buses used whatever plate was available in the general issue series. Some bus operators requested general issue registration plates with numbers that matched the fleet numbers of the buses they operated. In 2001 the entire Victorian bus fleet had their old general issue plates removed and replaced with the new accreditation plates, with some operators being allocated blocks of plates to match bus fleet numbers. Some fleets re-use plates when a bus in the fleet is replaced. On some occasions AO, AC, SO and NC plates were made in a plain Victoria in regular dies and can be described as an error manufactured plates, but allowed to be put on buses. It is noted that some AO suffixes received remakes under the current state slogan Vic – Stay Alert Stay Alive. Operators whose buses possess personalised plates have until 31 December 2015 to re-register to the accredited BSR bus plate scheme or when a bus will be accredited as part of TSV's bus accreditation transitional program.

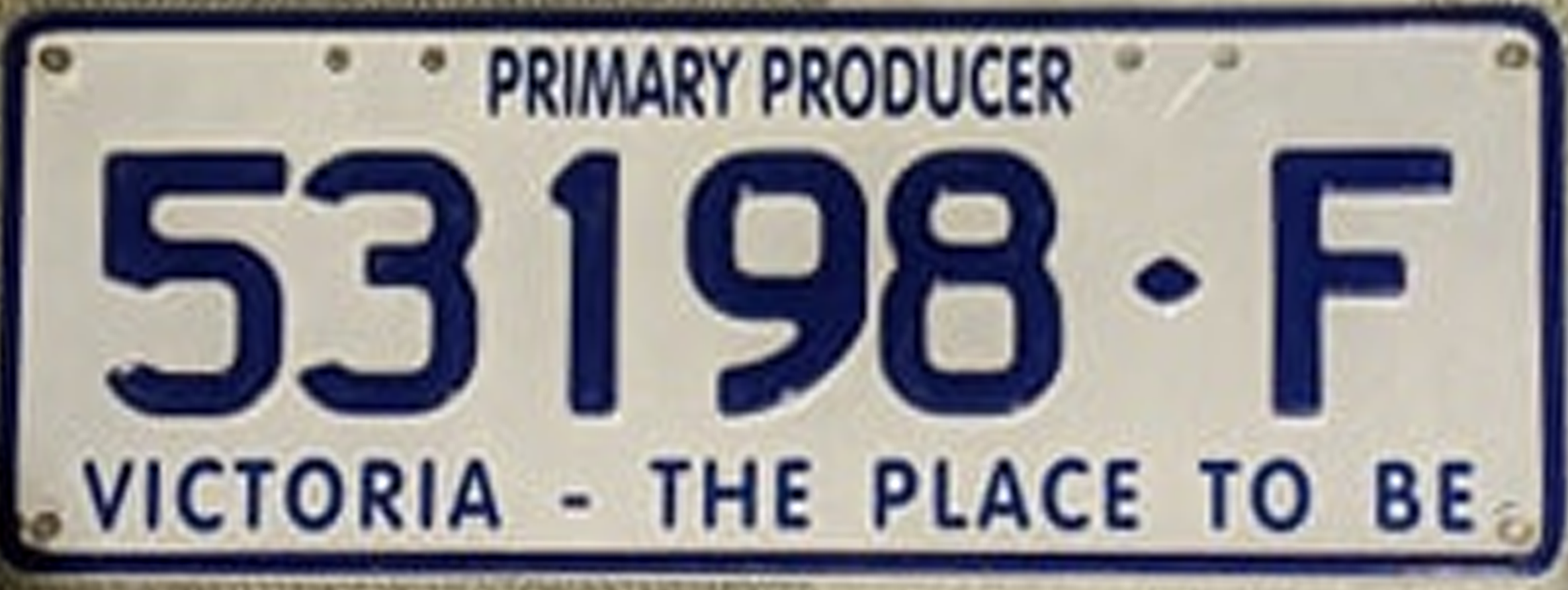
Primary Producer F series, "The Place To Be" Slogan

- Primary producers vehicles: are eligible for a discounted registration fee, such vehicles are issued using format nnnnn-P plates, with Primary Producer across the top. Runs current slogan at the bottom like standard issue plates. Number and letter combo is in slimline sizing on a standard issue plate size to fit added text.
- Tow trucks: used TOW-nnn for the first 1,000 registrations from 1981–1996 using the green Garden State plates. When the 1,001st tow truck was registered in 1996, the format swapped to the blue On the Move plates using nnnn-TT, the TT standing for "tow truck". This allowed for another 10,000 to be registered. In 2000, the interim style was adopted as per the general issue plates. With the release of The Place to Be plates, tow trucks now use general issue plates.

- Tow trucks: TOW-000 to TOW-999

- Tow trucks: 0000-TT to 9999-TT

- Heavy tow trucks: 000-HTT to 999-HTT. A batch of plates was produced in error with the letters reading HHT (rather than HTT) and the On the Move slogan; these were unused and sold to collectors.

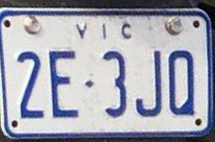
Motorcycle

- Motorcycles: have smaller plates compared to cars and trucks. The colouring and format of motorcycle plates has changed with the standard car-issued plates, except for the emblem inserts or other symbols that may take more space to represent. They used white-on-black plates until 1978, after which moving to green-on-white; blue-on-white has been used since 1994 or 1995. A replacement series, 1A-2BC, has been implemented as of 24 October 2010, replacing the previous two-letter, three-number format (aa-nnn) ending at JC-999.

- Recreational: Vic – Recreation (red on yellow) 0000-A to 9999-G then starts again at 0000-I to 9999-U. The 0000-H to 9999-H and the 000A-H to 000Z-H series is used for historic motorcycles. Some error plates were made in 000-DH as the diamond should have been positioned between alphas but allowed to be issued.

- Farm: Vic – Farm Bike (brown on white), 0000-V to 9999-Z, commenced 1 January 2011.

General issue combinations at the start of each year (motorcycles)
1960	1961	1962	1963	1964	1965	1966	1967	1968	1969
CO-026	CT-086	CW-290	CZ-402	DC-262	DF-180	DH-177	DL-086	DP-958	DV-121
1970	1971	1972	1973	1974	1975	1976	1977	1978	1979
GB-227	GL-663	HA-365	HR-023	JJ-029	JY-244	KN-280	LA-172	LN-138	MA-000
1980	1981	1982	1983	1984	1985	1986	1987	1988	1989
MP-300	NL-010	OG-171	PD-135	PX-000	RJ-650	SA-500	SS-900	TD-450	TQ-625
1990	1991	1992	1993	1994	1995	1996	1997	1998	1999
UF-100	US-045	VE-705	VQ-725	WC-820	WO-995	XC-460	XR-000	YH-000	YY-000
2000	2001	2002	2003	2004	2005	2006	2007	2008	2009
ZQ-000	AP-000	BG-000	BZ-000	CS-000	EA-000	FK-000	FU-000	HA-000	IA-000
2010	2011	2012	2013	2014	2015	2016	2017	2018	2019
JA-000	1B-1AA	1D-7AA	1J-7AA	1O-1AA	1Q-8BY	1U-6LO	1Y-1AA	2B-6AA	2F-3AA
2020	2021								

- Semi Trailers: requiring their own registration follow the one-letter, five-number format (A00-000). Trailers that requiring their own registration if: over 3 metres (10 ft) in length, business-owned, 200 kilograms (441 lb) or heavier, can carry 750 kilograms (1,653 lb) or more, wider than the towing vehicle or used for hauling boats. Larger, heavier semi-trailers use the nnnnn-S format exclusively but now has a new series format started in late 2016 as nnnn-Sn as the previous nnnnn-S series are exhausted.
- Trailers
  - 1932-1963: the format was in T-1 to T36-999 in white on black base porcelain finish was issued.
  - 1963–1977: G01-000 to M99-999 the first embossed plate format for trailers, with black ink on a white base background, VIC embossed at the top.
  - 1977–1994: A01-000 to E56-999 series in 1994 – change of dies style and to white reflective base – Victoria The Garden State
  - 1994–2000: E57-000 to F88-999 the colour ink was changed to blue on reflective white in the Victoria – On the Move slogan,
  - 2000-2013: F89-000 to F99-999 then skipped to N00-000 to V67-999 Victoria – The Place to Be
  - 2013–2016: V68-000 to X11-999 Vic – Stay Alert Stay Alive
  - 2016-2022: X12-000 to Z99-999 then B00-000 to D99-999 (currently at 400-00C as of September 2024)
- Bike rack plates: fitted onto the rear of vehicles (naturally having bicycles obstructing the registration plate) can have smaller numerical plates (black-on-white design) with Victoria – Bike Rack as the insert, fixed on the end of the rack and clearly visible. The bike rack plates has been updated as of December 2013 with screen printed bottom legend Vic – Stay Alert Stay Alive and Bike Rack legend at top and the ink was changed from black to blue. The slogan was later replaced with the current slogan Victoria – The Education State.
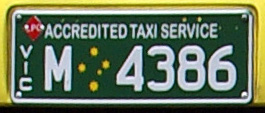
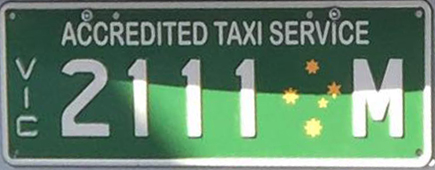
Metropolitan taxis
- Taxis: In August 1956, taxi specific green and white plates were introduced. Taxis in Melbourne were prefixed with T, while those in regional Victoria had TC prefixes. They were redesigned in November 2008 with a green background, the legend Accredited Taxi Service at the top the Vic embossed vertically on the right and the number/alpha sequence in white stamped slimline dies, with the Southern Cross in yellow as the separator. In Victoria, taxis have the following plates:
  - M-nnnn: metropolitan taxis (Melbourne), issued in the series M 0000 to M 9999 (except for M 5000 to M 5099 which are issued for taxis with wheel-chair licences only)
  - nnnn-M: metropolitan taxis (Melbourne), issued in the series 0000 M to 9999 M as the website published on 26 October 2017 shows as referred to
  - U-nnnn: taxis in urban and large regional areas - initially Ballarat, Bendigo, Geelong; later extended to Dandenong, Frankston and the Mornington Peninsula in 2014; issued in the series U 0000 to U 9999 (except for U 5000 to U 5099 which are issued for taxis with wheel-chair licences only).
  - R-nnnn: regional taxi plates, issued for taxis based in smaller regional towns, as well as areas on the fringes of Melbourne and Geelong not covered by M or U plated vehicles; a new zone introduced in 2014; issued in the series R 0000 to R 9999.
  - C-nnnn: country taxis located in areas other than those covered by metropolitan, urban or regional zones, issued in the series C 0000 to C 9999 (except for C 5000 – C 5099 which are issued for taxis with wheel-chair licences only).
  - nnnn-PS: peak service taxis, issued to taxis that can only operate during 3 pm and 7 am daily and 24 hours during the Australian Grand Prix, Melbourne Cup Day and Crown Oaks Day. Peak service plates are issued in the series 0000 PS to 9999 PS.
  - ST-nnnn: substitute taxis, issued in the series ST 0000 to ST 9999 to spare vehicles which replace licensed taxis when they are off the road for repairs. First commenced in 1970.
- Motor hire cars: were originally issued with the plates VHA-000 to VHA-999, with VHA standing for "Vehicle Hire Australia". Hire cars continued with VHB after the first 1,000 were issued, and then moved onto the VHC series. The company is no longer VHA, but VHA Corporate Cabs. This company runs a luxury car hire service. A large number of black Holden Caprice and similar limousines are seen with VH combinations, particularly in and around the Melbourne's CBD. Motor hire cycles have plates issued in the S-000 to S-999 range. The VHA and VHB Hire car plates are expected to be discontinued in Victoria during 2018, which confirms VHA or VHB plates are now no longer required to be registered but remain valid for pre-existing issues. Any VHA to VHC plates does not have to be in standard blue style as owners can restyle into mostly white on black colours. As of November 2019, VHD-000 to VHZ-999 range has been made available to any vehicle with the new plates bearing as "Commercial Passenger Vehicle" printed at the bottom of the plate and in blue/white colours.

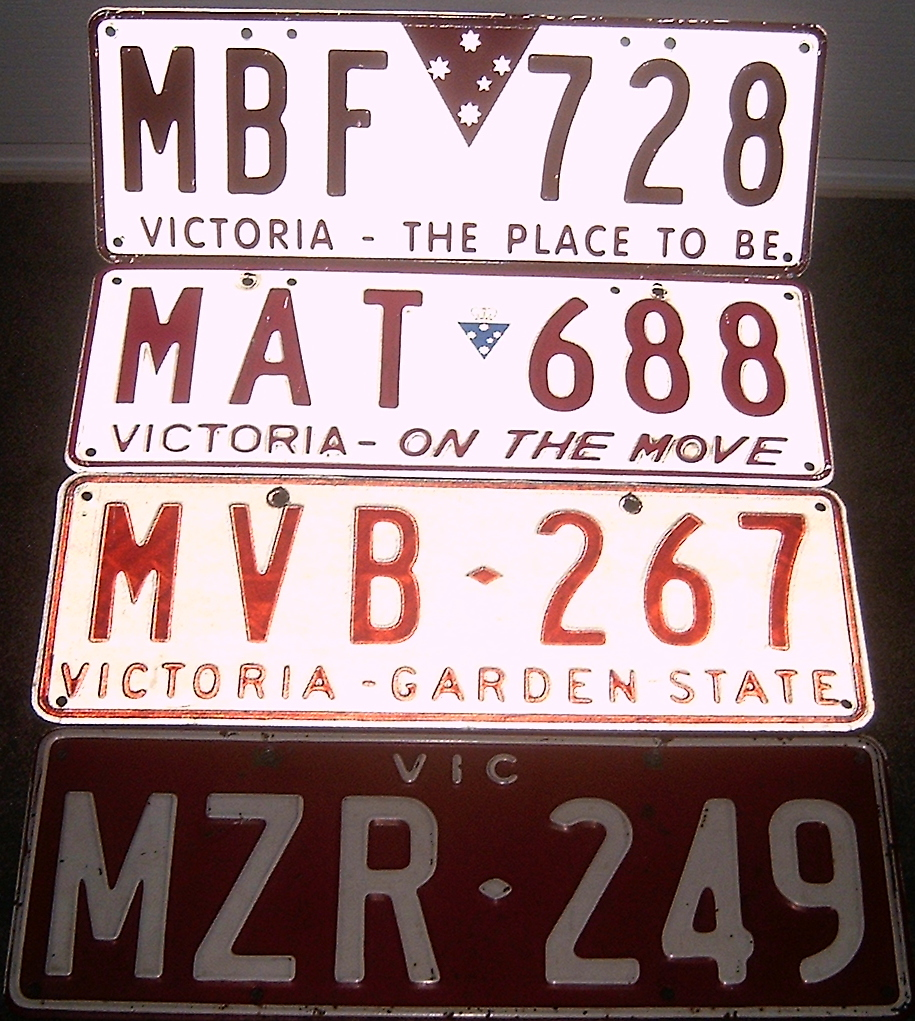
Victorian Government plates

- Consular Corps: CC-000 to CC-999. These plates used to appear identical to regular standard issue plates, except Victoria – Garden State or Victoria – On the Move was replaced with Vic – Consular Corps. In 2000, they were redesigned—the plate has the same dimensions as regular plates, but has the rego number in the font used for slimline plates. The legend "Consular Corps" appears at the top, while the legend "Victoria" appears at the bottom. As of 20 February 2016, the design was replaced with navy blue background, reflective white with VIC embossed vertically at left hand side, reflective white bottom legend Consular Corps in screen print and Consular Corp Melbourne gold logo in the middle between CC and the three-digit number. Character embossed reverted to the full style used in the Garden State and On the Move era.
- State government: including police cars, fire engines, and other state government cars usually use a combination in the Maa-nnn series of plates for registration. These plates exclusively use the Maa-nnn combinations and their design has always mirrored that of general issue plates. The government plate series started at MZA-000 to MZZ-999, MYA-000 to MYZ-999, MXA-000 to MXZ-999, MWA-000 to MWZ-999 and MVA-000 to MVU-999. The original state government plates were identical in design to the general issue equivalents. With the release of the Victoria – Garden State plates in 1977, the green text on white background was replaced with red text on white for government applications. This colour scheme has remained ever since, even with the adoption of newer plate designs and slogans. In 1992, plates in the MVE-000 to MVU-999 series sported a Victoria – Drive Safely slogan as per the general issue plates of this time. With the switch in 1994 to the slogan, Victoria – On the Move, the plates started at MAA-000 having skipped from MVV-000 to MVZ-999. The design and slogan changed in 2000 to the Victoria – The Place to Be type starting at MBE-000. Sometime between August 2013 and April 2015, the series continued from MCV-000 under the new slogan Vic – Stay Alert Stay Alive. From circa March 2016, Government red plates began to be produced with the Education State slogan from MCZ-000 onwards. Due to a supplier change, emergency service vehicles temporarily reverted to general issue plates (blue on white) in late 2016. The new plates appear to have a lighter shade of red and the new series began at MDA-000. As of September 2024, the series was up to MDQ-000.
- Federal government: cars owned by the Australian Government but registered in Victoria use plates in the ZED-nnn series, with the letter Z being red. This is a carryover from the Federal Registration Scheme of the 1950s, when the Zaa-nnn series was allocated to the Australian Government. Trailers owned by the Federal Government use the combinations Znn-nnn.
- Electric vehicle trial: between October 2010 and June 2014, the Victorian Government operated an electric vehicle trial with 54 vehicles as of December 2012. These trial vehicles featured special registration plates in the same design as the regular plates of the same vintage, but using the format nnn-EVT (e.g. 024-EVT) and the slogan Vic – Electric Vehicle Trial.
- Historic Vehicle: Originally issued as CH-nnnn and nnnnn-H and as of 22^{nd} December 2018 the new format series has commenced nnnn-Hn by simply shifting the H from the last place to the second last. White on Maroon base.
- Rally Vehicle: nnnn-RP in white on navy blue base.

== Discontinued plates ==
- Interstate trucks: IS·nnnn Allocated from IS-0000 to IU-6999 as it was replaced by the current FIRS scheme in 1987.
- T- and TC-series taxis: Melbourne: T·nnnn Country: TC·nnnn introduced in 1953 and was recalled when replaced by the current M, C, U, and PS series
- P-series 28-day permit: P·1 to P31·999 This series started in 1930 and was only valid for 28 days. Five different styles were issued, starting with enamel, then the second style in vertical "Vic" with dot separator between alphanumerics. The third style has "Vic" across the top, and the fourth style changed to a diamond separator. The final style had the diamond separator moved to between the second and third numerals. The P-series plates was discontinued in the late 1980s as plates were not returned on expiry and was replaced with paper permits.
- V- and MZx-series Government plates: V·nnnn Introduced in the late 1930s starting with vertical "Vic", which was later relocated to the top of the plate. Replaced in 1963 with the previous style as shown MZZ·nnn allocated from MZZ·999 to MZA·000.
