= Myer (name) =

Myer is both a surname and a given name. Notable people with the name include:

Surname:

- Albert Myer (disambiguation), various people
- Baillieu Myer (1926–2022), Australian businessman and philanthropist
- Buddy Myer (1904–1974), American baseball player
- Dillon S. Myer (1891–1982), American government official
- George Val Myer, English architect and portrait painter
- Horatio Myer (1850–1916), British businessman and politician
- James Myer (born 1951), American documentarist and educational filmmaker
- Jarret Myer (born 1973), American media entrepreneur
- Jon Myer (1922–2001), experimental physicist and inventor
- Ken Myer (1921–1992), American-born Australian philanthropist and businessman
- Luke Myer (born 1995), British politician
- Merlyn Myer (1900–1982), Australian philanthropist
- Norman Myer (1897–1956), Australian businessman
- Rupert Myer (born 1958), Australian businessman
- Sidney Myer (1878–1934), businessman who co-founded the Australian department store chain; father of Ken
- Steve Myer (born 1954), American football player
- Val Myer (1883–1959), British architect and portrait painter

Given name:

- Myer Fredman (1932–2014), British-Australian conductor
- Myer Galpern (1903–1993), British politician
- Myer Horowitz (1932–2022), Canadian academic and administrator
- Myer Lyon (c. 1750–1797), opera singer in London and Dublin
- Myer Prinstein (1878–1924), American long jumper and triple jumper
- Myer Rosenblum (1907–2002), Australian rugby player and lawyer
- Myer Skoog (1926–2019), American basketball player
- Myer Strouse (1825–1878), American politician from Pennsylvania

== Fictional ==
- Prince Myer, the player character in the video game Deadly Towers
