= Myer family =

Australian family

- Country: Australia
- Earlier spellings: Baevski
- Etymology: Russian: Майер
- Origin: Mogilev, Belarus
- Founder: Sidney Myer; Merlyn Myer (née Baillieu); Sir Norman Myer
- Members: Ken Myer; Baillieu Myer; Lady Marigold Southey; Neilma Gantner; Carrillo Gantner; Sid Myer; Rupert Myer
- Connected families: Hordern family; Baillieu family
- Traditions: Jewish (initially); Anglican

The Myer family is an Australian retailing dynasty of Jewish origin. It was founded in Australia by Sidney Myer, who started the department store Myer, and Merlyn Myer, his wife. Following the death of Sidney Myer in 1934, his nephew, Sir Norman Myer, continued much of his retailing dynasty. The family has a strong history of philanthropy and established one of Australia's first single family offices in 1976.

== History ==
The Myer family were founded by brothers Elcon (1875-1938) and Simcha (Sidney) Myer Baevski (1878-1934). They were two of eleven sons of Ezekiel Baevski and Koona Dubrusha, who were Russian Jews in Krychaw (Krichev), present-day Belarus. With little money, Elcon, and later Sidney, would migrate to Australia, learning English and taking the family name Myer. Sidney would found the Myer department store, where he established his family's wealth. On 8 January 1920, Sidney married Merlyn Baillieu, a member of the wealthy Baillieu family.

== Family tree ==
- Ezekiel Baevski m. Koona Dubrusha née Shur
  - Yacov Meer Baevski (2 May 1928 – 1899), m. Chaya née Sitz
    - Sir Norman Myer (born Nahum Moshe Baevski; 25 May 1897 – 17 December 1956) m. (1) Gladys Margaret née Roche, divorced in 1951.
      - Pamela Myer m. Simon Warrender DSC (11 August 1922 – 8 May 2011), a businessman and former Royal Navy officer, the son of Victor Warrender, 1st Baron Bruntisfield. Myer and Warrender divorced in 1986.
    - Sir Norman Myer (born Nahum Moshe Baevski; 25 May 1897 – 17 December 1956) m. (2) Pamela Margaret née Sallmann.
  - Elcon Myer (born Elcon Baevski; 4 December 1875 – 18 February 1938) m. Rose née Marks ( – 4 August 1927), later divorced.
  - Sidney Myer (born Simcha Myer Baevski (Russian: Симха Майер Баевский); 8 February 1878 – 5 September 1934) m. (1) Hannah Nance née Flegeltaub (1868–1963) on 8 March 1905; divorced.
  - Sidney Myer (8 February 1878 – 5 September 1934) m. (2) Merlyn née Baillieu DBE (8 January 1900 – 3 September 1982)
    - Ken Myer AC (1 March 1921 – 30 July 1992) m. Prudence née Boyd in 1947, divorced 1976.
      - Joanna Baevski
      - Michael Myer
      - Philip Myer
      - Martyn Myer, a Coles Myer director since 1996.
      - Andrew Myer
    - Ken Myer AC m. Yasuko née Hiraoka (16 March 1945 – 30 July 1992). Ken is a co-founder of the Myer Foundation. Ken and Yasuko Myer were killed in a light aircraft crash in Alaska on 30 July 1992.
    - Neilma (7 November 1922 – 15 June 2015) m. Vallejo Gantner (1911–1996) on 8 August 1941 in Toorak, Melbourne, and later divorced. Neilma is a co-founder of The Gantner Myer Collection of Australian Aboriginal Art, which was assembled over a four-year period by curator Jennifer Isaacs. The collection was unveiled in San Francisco in September 1999. Neilma Gantner was a member of the Executive of International Social Service, and of the Myer Foundation and the Sidney Myer Fund. She worked as a novelist, poet and short story writer under the pseudonym of Neilma Sidney, and founded the Four Winds Cultural Festival (Bermagui, New South Wales). In 2017 Writers Victoria announced the first recipients for the Neilma Sidney Literary Travel Fund, named in her memory.
      - Carrillo Gantner, a co-founder of The Gantner Myer Collection of Australian Aboriginal Art
      - Vallejo Gantner Jnr ( – 1962) at the age of 19. Along with her son Carillo and brother Baillieu Myer, she established
    - Sidney Baillieu Myer AC (Bails) (11 January 1926 – 22 January 2022) m. Sarah née Hordern. Sidney Baillieu Myer was a co-founder and past president of the Myer Foundation. He was a Trustee of the Sidney Myer Fund from 1958 to 2001 and chairman from 1992 to 2001. He was chairman of The Myer Emporium Limited, president of the Howard Florey Institute and Executive Member of the CSIRO. His career has spanned the fields of business, medical research, aged care, Australia-Asian relations, the arts, conservation, education and rural communities. His commitments and appointments include: Patron of Asialink, Patron of the Foundation for Rural & Regional Renewal, Trustee Emeritus, National Gallery of Victoria, Director of the Howard Florey Institute, 1971–2002, and President, 1988–1992, chairman, The Myer Emporium Limited, 1978–1986, Executive Member, CSIRO, 1981–1985. He was made an Honorary Doctor of Law, University of Melbourne, in 1993.
      - Sid Myer
      - Samantha Myer
      - Rupert Hordern Myer AO (13 August 1958 – ), currently the chair, Australia Council for the Arts, since 2012, and a Deputy Chairman of Myer Holdings Limited.
        - Edgar Myer, current chairman of the Melbourne Symphony Orchestra, since 2025.
    - Marigold Merlyn Baillieu Myer AC m. (1) Ross Shelmerdine ( – 1979) in 1950.
      - Tom Shelmerdine
      - Stephen Shelmerdine AM, a winemaker
    - Marigold Merlyn Shelmerdine (Lady Southey) AC m. (2) Sir Robert Southey (1922 - 1998) on 22 July 1982. Lady Southey has a longstanding service to the community in the support of health care, medical research and the arts. She was Lieutenant-Governor of Victoria 2001–2006; and served as president of Philanthropy Australia between 2000 and 2006; and the St Catherine's School Foundation. She resigned as president of the Myer Foundation in 2004. Lady Southey is a supporter and Honorary Life Member of the Australian Ballet, Life Member of the Nuffield Farming Scholars Association, and a supporter of Birds Australia.
