= Baillieu Myer =

Australian businessman and philanthropist (1926–2022)

Baillieu Myer AC
- Born: Sidney Baillieu Myer; 11 January 1926; San Francisco, California, United States
- Died: 22 January 2022 (aged 96); Merricks, Victoria, Australia
- Education: University of Cambridge
- Title: Chairman of the Myer Emporium
- Spouse: Sarah Hordern (m. 1955)
- Children: 3, including Sid and Rupert
- Parents: Sidney Myer; Merlyn Myer
- Relatives: Myer family

Sidney Baillieu Myer AC (11 January 1926 – 22 January 2022), also known as Bails Myer, was an Australian businessman and philanthropist. A member of the Myer family retailing dynasty, he was the son of Sidney and Merlyn Myer. He joined his family's company, the Myer Emporium, in 1949 and became its chairman in 1983. Myer helped found what is now Target Australia in 1968. He oversaw its merger with GJ Coles & Company to create Coles Myer and retired from business in 1994. In his later life, Myer was involved with philanthropic, scientific and arts organisations.

== Early life and education ==
Myer was born on 11 January 1926 in San Francisco, California. He was one of four children of Sidney Myer, who founded the Australian department store chain Myer in 1900, and Merlyn Myer (née Baillieu). Because Sidney Myer's divorce from his first wife was not recognised under Australian law, his second wife, Merlyn, travelled to San Francisco for the birth of each of her four children so that they would be considered legitimate. Baillieu had an older brother, Ken, and two sisters, Neilma and Marigold. In 1929, the family moved to Toorak, Victoria, Australia.

Myer attended Geelong Grammar School where one of his teachers was the historian Manning Clark. He served as a sub-lieutenant in the Royal Australian Navy during World War II aboard HMAS Pirie. After the war, he studied commerce at the University of Melbourne for one year and then attended Pembroke College, Cambridge, where he received a Master of Arts degree in economics. He then trained in retail at Macy's in New York and Harrods in London. In London, he worked with the speech therapist Lionel Logue to manage his stammer.

== Business career ==
Myer joined his family's business, the Myer Emporium, in 1949, and was named executive director in 1955. Over the next two decades, he and his brother Ken advocated for an aggressive expansion of the business into the suburban market, though this strategy was met with initial resistance from the company's board. In 1960, Myer and his brother established a Myer store in the Chadstone Shopping Centre. The store's success led to the company establishing numerous other suburban centres in Melbourne and Sydney. Myer oversaw the 1968 rebranding of the Myer Emporium–acquired retail chain Lindsay's as Lindsay's Target (now Target Australia) after negotiating the right to use the name and logo of the American Target. He attempted to open three Lindsay's Target supermarkets in South Australia, but they were unable to compete with the Coles and Woolworths supermarkets.

Myer stepped down from his position as executive director in 1972 but remained on Myer's board. After Ken Myer's retirement, Myer became the non-executive chairman of the board in 1978. He was named executive chairman of the company in 1983 during a major recession and led its takeover of the department store chain Grace Bros that year. He also oversaw the Myer Emporium's merger with GJ Coles & Company to create Coles Myer and served as the deputy chairman of the merged company from 1986 to 1994. He was named a Companion of the Order of Australia as part of the 1990 Australia Day Honours "for service to business and commerce, to government and to the community". He retired from the company in 1994.

Outside of his family's business, Myer was a director and chairman of the financial services company National Mutual from 1978 to 1992. He was a member of the boards of Cadbury Schweppes, the Commonwealth Bank, Henry Jones IXL, Elders IXL, NM Rothschild & Sons and Ten Network Holdings.

== Other activities ==
Myer was actively involved in philanthropic, scientific, arts and agricultural activities. He and Ken Myer established the Myer Foundation, a philanthropic organisation, in 1959; he was the vice-chair or chair of the foundation until 1995. From 1971 to 1996, he was a director and president of the Howard Florey Institute of Experimental Physiology and Medicine. In the 1970s and 1980s, he was on the boards of CSIRO and the Salvation Army and served as a deputy chairman of the National Gallery of Victoria and the Victorian College of the Arts. In 1993, he received an honorary Doctor of Law degree from the University of Melbourne.

== Death ==
Myer died at his home in Merricks, Victoria, on 22 January 2022, eleven days after his 96th birthday. He was survived by his wife of 66 years, Sarah Myer (née Hordern), and their three children, Sid, Rupert and Samantha.
