= Vallejo Gantner Hut =

Australian bush hikers' hut

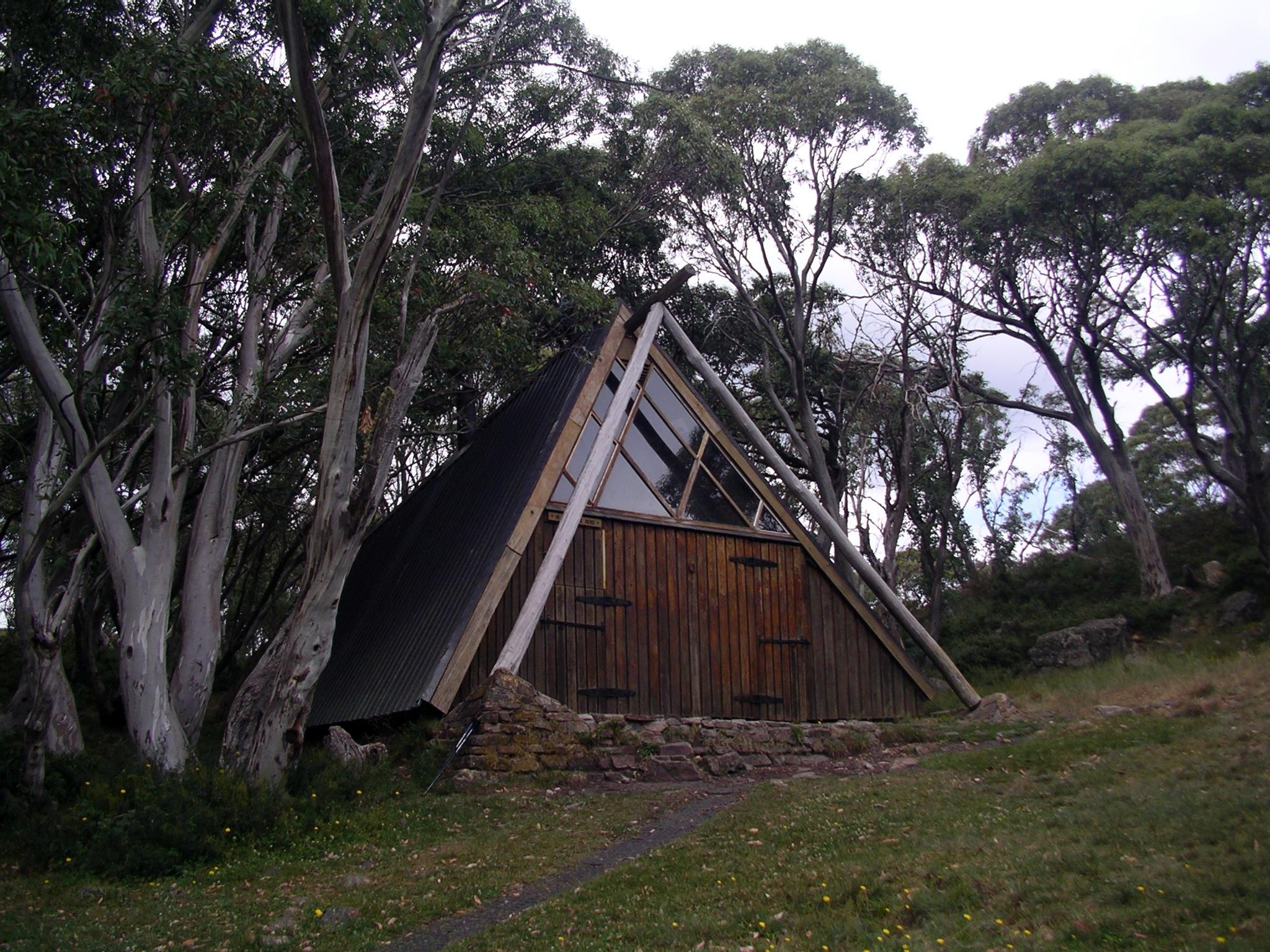
- Interactive map of the Vallejo Gantner Hut area

General information
- Coordinates: 37°10′19.6″S 146°40′13.3″E
- Year built: 1971

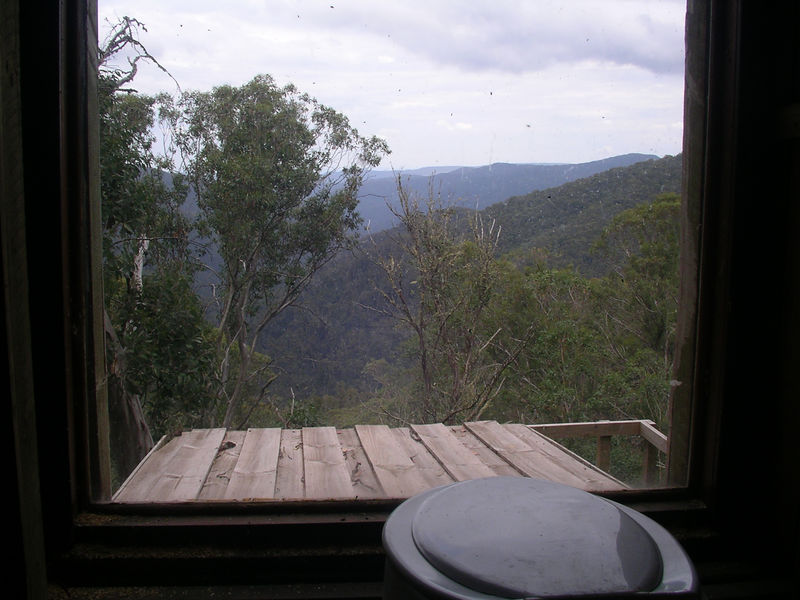
The nearby toilet with a view

The Vallejo Gantner Hut is located at Macalister Springs near Mount Howitt and the Crosscut Saw. The construction commenced in late 1968. The hut was built as a memorial following the death of Vallejo Gantner, the grandson of Sidney Myer the founder of the Myer department store chain.

== Ganter Biography ==
Vallejo Gantner was born in San Francisco, California to author Neilma Gantner and his brother Carrillo Gantner, a noted philanthropist, actor, director and theatre entrepreneur, he moved with his family to Melbourne, Australia at the age of 12. He attended Melbourne Grammar School and was involved in outdoor activities throughout his student life. He was killed at the age of 19 when his shotgun accidentally discharged while hunting rabbits.

His mother asked the Victoria State Government permission to construct the hut as a memorial to her son. The hut was built with considerable difficulty due to poor access and adverse weather conditions over a two-year period from 1970 to 1971 with the help of friends from student days at Melbourne Grammar School and from other schools.

== Vallejo Gantner hut ==
The hut was designed by architect David McGlashen. Its unusual triangular design like a hiking tent readily sheds snow in winter.

The hut is a popular destination for bushwalkers in summer and for cross country skiers in winter and is known colloquially as "Gantner's", and amongst many students from the local schools including Timbertop simply as "Mac Springs". It is now within the boundaries of the Alpine National Park.

In 2013, Parks Victoria unveiled the "loo with a view", at Macalister Springs, which uses a sealed tank system to ensure no waste or seepage into the local environment. The project cost $50,000 including design, construction and installation. .

The site is listed in the Victorian Heritage Register.
