= Lee Neil =

Australian businessman (1872 – 1934)

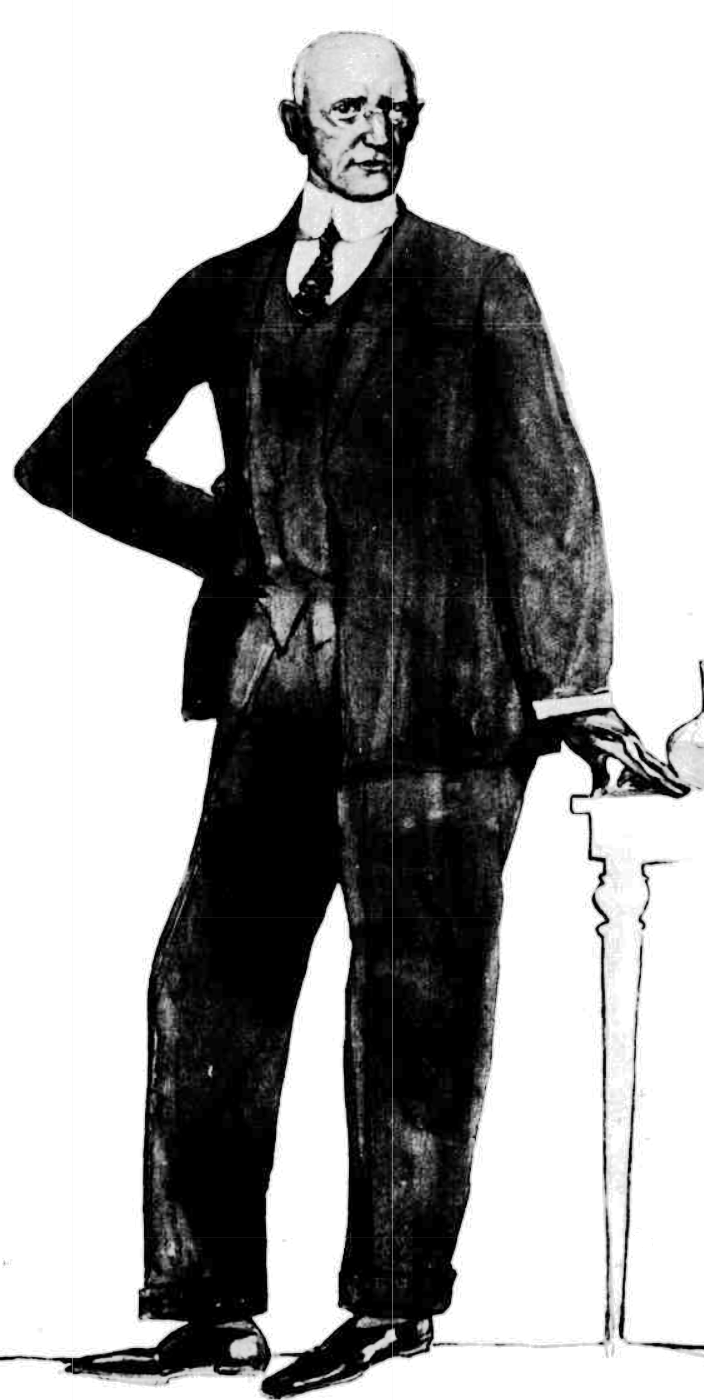
- 1927 caricature by Will Dyson
- Born: Edwin Lee Neil; 13 October 1872; Chorlton-on-Medlock, Lancashire, England
- Died: 17 December 1934 (aged 62)
- Occupations: Accountant; Company director; company manager; managing director

Edwin Lee Neil CBE (13 October 1872 – 17 December 1934) was an Australian businessman. He was born in Chorlton-on-Medlock and emigrated with his family to Australia in 1884. He joined his father's drapery firm, Wright & Neil, as an accountant in 1895. The company was taken over by Sidney Myer in 1911, and Neil worked for Myer for the rest of his life. During World War I, there was a shortage of men and Neil recognised the ability of Adeline May Keating. In 1919 Keating sailed for Japan to purchase toys as stock for the company. He became managing director of Myer Emporium Ltd when it formed in 1925, and took over as chairman on Myer's death in September 1934. Neil himself, however, died a few months later.

Neil married Lucy Hunt in 1900, and they had a son and three daughters. Their son, Alan, served as a medical missionary with the South Seas Evangelical Mission and later became co-founder of a group known as the Fellowship.

The Australian Dictionary of Biography describes Neil as a "tall, careful, religious, conservative man" and suggests that his "caution, business connexions and experience" complemented Sidney Myer's "intuitive flair and energy". He played the organ at St Hilary's, Kew and served as lay canon at St Paul's Cathedral, Melbourne. Wei-Han Kuan notes that Neil was "capable and energetic both in mission societies and in diocesan affairs". He was also instrumental in Myer's conversion to Christianity. Neil was a close friend of C. H. Nash, and he was the prime mover in the establishment of the Melbourne Bible Institute (now the Melbourne School of Theology) in 1920, with Nash as the founding principal. Kuan suggests that Neil considered MBI "a necessary institution for the training of overseas missionaries and as an appropriate avenue for the deployment of the exiled Nash's gifts," since Nash had been forced to resign from the Anglican Church.

Neil was appointed Commander of the Order of the British Empire in 1926 for his work as Australian Commissioner at the British Empire Exhibition.
