= Robert Southey (businessman) =

Australian businessman and politician

Sir Robert Southey AO, CMG

President of the Liberal Party of Australia
- In office 1970–1975

Chairman of the Australian Ballet Foundation
- In office 1980–1990

Personal details
- Born: 20 March 1922 Melbourne, Victoria, Australia
- Died: 29 September 1998 (aged 76) Melbourne, Victoria, Australia
- Spouses: Valerie Clarke (m. 1946; died 1977); Marigold Shelmerdine (née Myer) (m. 1982)
- Education: Geelong Grammar School: Dux; Trinity College, Melbourne Magdalen College, Oxford: First Class Honours; Master of Arts

Sir Robert John Southey AO, CMG (20 March 1922 – 29 September 1998) was an Australian businessman, who was president of the Liberal Party of Australia from 1970 to 1975, and chairman of The Australian Ballet Foundation from 1980 to 1990.

== Early life, education and military service ==
Southey was born in Melbourne in 1922, the son of Allen Hope Southey and his wife, Ethel Thorpe (Nancy) McComas. He was schooled at Geelong Grammar School, at which he was dux of his final year. At the completion of his schooling, he entered Trinity College, Melbourne in 1940 before travelling to England to study classics at Magdalen College, Oxford. When World War II broke out, Southey enlisted in the British Army, and following completion of training at the Royal Military College, Sandhurst he was commissioned in the 2nd Battalion of the Coldstream Guards. He saw service in North Africa and Italy, attaining the rank of captain.

After the war, Southey returned to Oxford, graduating in 1948 with first-class honours and a Master of Arts. He also rowed for Oxford and was elected to the Leander Club.

== Business and political career ==
On his return to Australia, Southey joined the company William Haughton as a wool buyer. He became active in conservative politics, joining the Malvern branch of the Liberal Party.

In 1970, he became federal president of the Liberal Party, where he managed leadership turmoil within the party after the election of the Whitlam government in 1972 which saw many of Australia's ties with Britain abolished. With parliamentary preselection virtually assured, Southey's political hopes were dashed after confidential memos he had sent to Prime Minister William McMahon, in which he called for several newspaper editors to be "straightened out", were published in a book. Southey stood down as president in 1975, and did not seek election. By that time he was managing director of William Haughton, as well as chairman of several other companies.

In 1978, he was invited to join the Australian Ballet as a director, and was appointed chairman in 1980 after resolving an industrial dispute and dancers' strike. Southey's involvement with the dance world had begun during his childhood, when his uncle, the ophthalmologist Ringland Anderson, looked after members of the Ballets Russes when they visited Australia.

== Honours ==
- Companion of the Order of St Michael and St George (CMG) in the Queen's Birthday Honours of 1970, as President of the Liberal Party of Victoria
- Knight Bachelor in 1976, for services to politics
- Officer of the Order of Australia (AO) in 1993, for service to the arts particularly through the Australian Ballet Foundation

== Personal life ==
Southey was married twice, first, on 20 August 1946, to Valerie Clarke, the daughter of Liberal politician Sir Frank Clarke, who was President of the Victorian Legislative Council. Valerie Southey died on 30 November 1977, and from 1982 he was married to Marigold Shelmerdine (née Myer) until his death in 1998.
