= Adeline Keating =

Australian businesswoman

Adeline May Keating
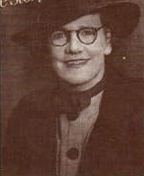
- Born: 8 January 1885; Bendigo
- Died: 7 March 1957 (aged 72); Brighton, Victoria
- Occupation: buyer
- Employer: Myer Emporium
- Known for: buyer for the Myer Emporium

Adeline May Keating (8 January 1885 – 7 March 1957) was an Australian businesswoman. She rose to be an international buyer for Sidney Myer's emporium. She was said to be the highest paid businesswoman in Australia.

== Life ==
Keating was born in Bendigo in 1885. Her mother was Ann Jobling (born Todd) and her father was William Keating and she was their seventh surviving child. She had a complex relationship with her father who was a sharebroker. He regarded her as an unwanted child and her feelings for him evolved from respect to hate. He went broke and died in 1908. For the next ten years she and her mother lived in poverty and Keating gave up her dream of becoming an actress.

On 5 August 1915 Sidney Myer opened his emporium, a building so iconic that its frame is still retained in the Emporium Melbourne on the same site over 100 years later. Keating who had met Myer walked miles to join the crowd and she was hired to be a salesperson in the store. She found success in the business.

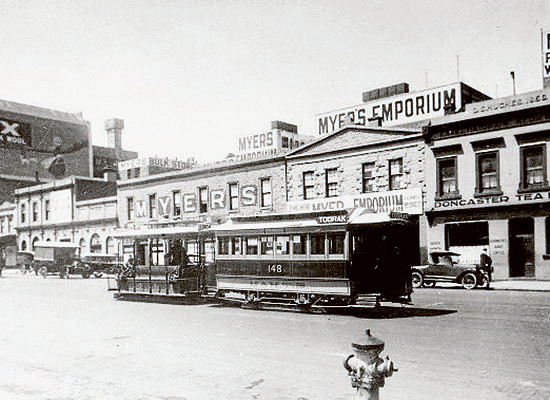
c.1924 – Myer's Melbourne Emporium

During World War One there was a shortage of men and Lee Neil recognised the ability of Keating. In 1919, she was paid three pounds per week and she sailed for Japan to purchase toys as stock for the company. She became the stores chief buyer which was a role normally held by a man. She was the highest paid Australian businesswoman and she treated Myer disrespectfully. She was known for her tirades against him which included anti-semitic insults. However he did not sack her.

She travelled for three-quarters of every year and she would return each Christmas to organise that year's toy display in the store. She went to the USA, Germany, the UK and other European countries. She was brought back in disgrace once but she kept her job. She began buying again in Japan. In 1932 she resigned and started her own manufacturing business. Keating died in the Melbourne suburb of Brighton.

In 1987 Joan Hellegers' biography of her was published. It was titled "Against the Current: The Story of Adeline Keating."
