= John W. Searle =

Australian minister and educator

John William Searle (29 March 1905 – 7 July 1969) was an Australian minister and educator. He was the second Principal of the Melbourne Bible Institute (now the Melbourne School of Theology), serving from 1944 to 1963.

Searle was born in Normanby, Yorkshire and arrived in Australia in 1925. He studied at MBI from 1928 to 1930 and at the University of Melbourne from 1934 to 1939. He became a minister of the Presbyterian Church of Australia and served in Queenstown, Tasmania from 1940 to 1941.

Searle was then appointed Vice Principal at MBI and took over as Principal when C. H. Nash retired. Rowland Ward notes that Searle "was loyal to the vision of the founders and of Nash, his mentor." Like Nash, Searle "had faced opposition from those unsympathetic to the Evangelical faith, but had not been embittered by it."
