= Carrillo Gantner =

Australian cultural leader and philanthropist

- Born: Carrillo Baillieu Gantner; San Francisco, California, United States
- Occupations: Cultural leader, philanthropist
- Family: Neilma Gantner (mother) Merlyn Myer (grandmother) Sidney Myer (grandfather)

Carrillo Baillieu Gantner AC is an American-Australian cultural leader and philanthropist, noted for his work in the state of Victoria. He is a member of the Melbourne retailing Myer family.

== Early life ==
Carrillo was born in San Francisco, California, the son of Neilma Gantner with philanthropist and author Vallejo Gantner, and grandson of Merlyn Myer and Sidney Myer, founder of the Myer retail chain.

== Career ==
Carrillo's most well-known achievement lies in the area of founding theatres and theatre companies. He founded the Playbox Theatre in 1976 and in the late 1980s was the driving force for the building of the Malthouse Theatre complex which opened in 1990. He was president of the Myer Foundation 2004-2010 and was in 2008 Chairman of the Sidney Myer Fund, the Myer family's two philanthropic arms.

Carrillo was a Melbourne City Councillor, where he was Chairman of the Planning and the Docklands Committees and had portfolio responsibility for Cultural Development. He worked for the Australian Foreign Affairs Department as Cultural Counsellor at the Australian Embassy in Beijing (1985–1987).

He toured many companies from China and Japan to Australia and, with writer Rodney Hall was joint artistic director of the Four Winds Festival in Bermagui, New South Wales. Because of his long and distinguished career in the arts, arts administration and the theatre where he worked as an actor and director, Carrillo was appointed by the Victorian state government as president of the Victorian Arts Centre Trust from July 2000. He served three terms to 2009.

The government appointed him as chairman of the Melbourne International Arts Festival from mid-2010. He was Chairman of the Melbourne International Comedy Festival for six years to March 2000, Chair of the Performing Arts Board and a member of the Australia Council 1990–1993. He was a member of the Australian International Cultural Council (chaired by the Minister for Foreign Affairs) for three years until 2003. Until 2002 he served for three years as a member of the Cultural Network of the Australian National Commission for UNESCO. He was also a member of the Trilateral Commission.

== Television career ==
In 1979, Carrillo appeared in several episodes of the Australian TV series Prisoner (known internationally as Prisoner: Cell Block H) internationally as sociology lecturer Peter Clements.

== Recognition and honours ==
In 2003, Carrillo received the inaugural Dame Elisabeth Murdoch Cultural Leader of the year Award.

He won the Dorothy Crawford Award for services to Australian writers.

In 2007 Carrillo was named Victorian of the Year in recognition of his cultural and philanthropic service to Victoria. In the same year he was named Victorian Senior Australian of the Year.

In 2008 he was elected an Honorary Fellow of The Australian Academy of the Humanities.

In 2018 he was appointed an adjunct professor at the Australia-China Institute for Arts and Culture, Western Sydney University.

Carrillo was appointed Companion of the Order of Australia (AC) in January 2019 for professional engagement in, and philanthropic support of the performing and visual arts, and for promoting cultural exchange between Australia and Asia. He was made an Officer of the Order of Australia (AO) in June 2001, and in the same year was awarded the Centenary Medal.
