= Rupert Myer =

Australian businessman and philanthropist

Rupert Myer AO
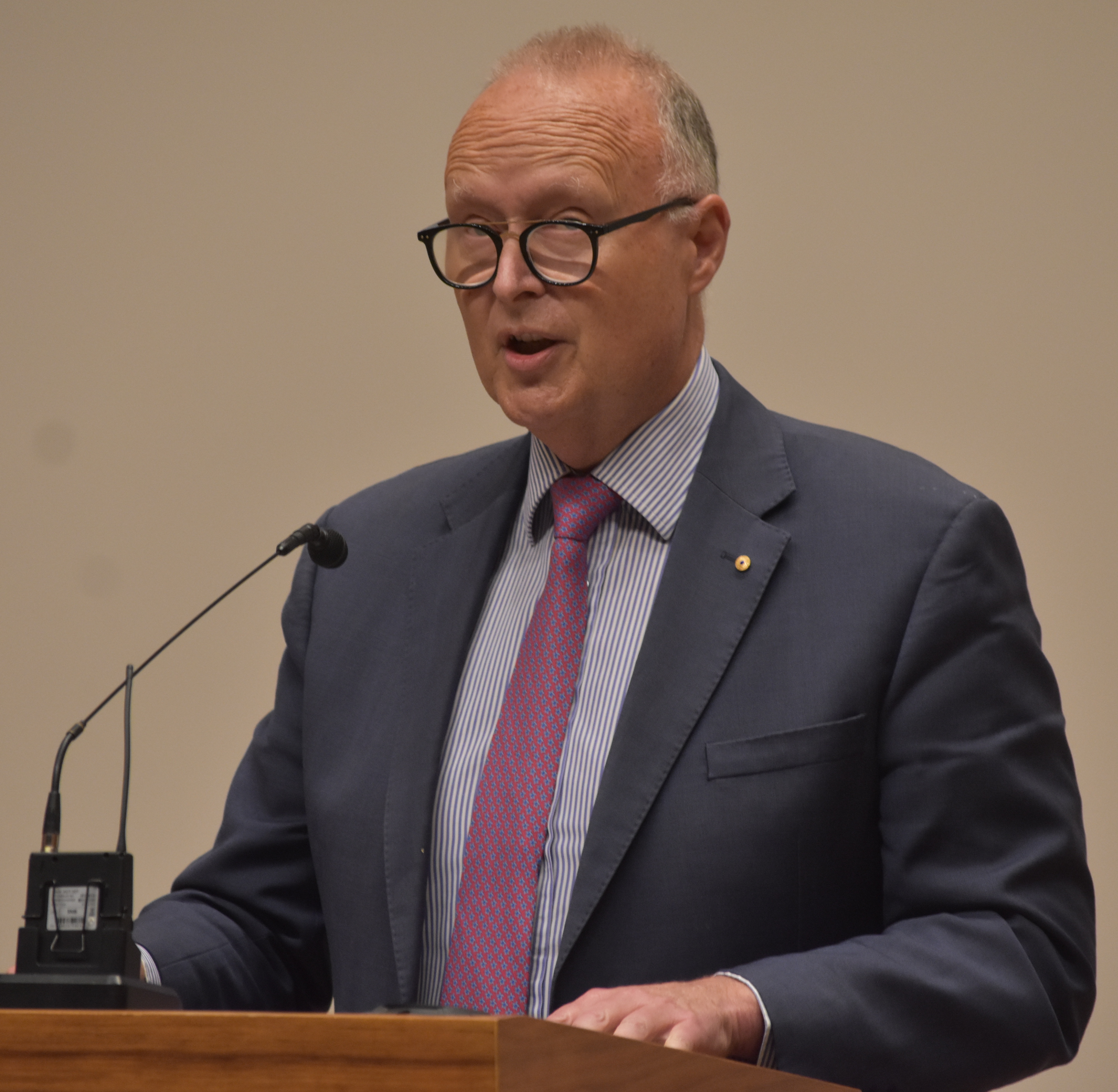
- Myer in 2025 at Trinity College
- Born: 13 August 1958 (age 68); Melbourne, Victoria, Australia
- Occupations: Chair, Australia Council for the Arts (2012-present); Deputy Chairman, Myer Holdings Limited (2012–2015)
- Board member of: Amcil (ASX: AMH); Ecargo (ASX: ECG); Healthscope (ASX: HSO)
- Parent(s): Baillieu Myer (father); Sarah Hordern (mother)
- Relatives: Sidney Myer (brother); Samantha Myer (sister); Merlyn Myer (paternal grandmother); Sidney Myer (paternal grandfather); June Baillieu (maternal grandmother); Samuel Hordern, OBE (maternal grandfather); Ken Myer (uncle)
- Awards: Member of the Order of Australia (2005); Officer of the Order of Australia (2015)

Rupert Hordern Myer AO (born 13 August 1958) is an Australian businessman and philanthropist. The Myer family’s largest investment portfolio is managed by The Myer Family Company, where Rupert Myer was chairman until 2012.

Myer's grandfather, Sidney Myer, was the founder of Myer, the largest department store company in Australia, and his father, Baillieu Myer, also served as company chairman. He serves as a director on the boards of Amcil (ASX: AMH), Ecargo (ASX: ECG) and Healthscope (ASX: HSO). Myer is a supporter of the arts, and has served as chairman of both the Australia Council for the Arts and the National Gallery of Australia.

== Education ==
Myer attended Trinity College while studying at the University of Melbourne, from which he graduated with a Bachelor of Commerce (Honours) degree. He subsequently gained a Master of Arts from the University of Cambridge.

== Arts and philanthropy ==
Myer was the chair of The Australia Council for the Arts from 2012 until 2018 . His previous roles in the arts include serving as chairman of the National Gallery of Australia, Opera Australia, Capital Fund, Kaldor Public Art Projects and National Gallery of Victoria Foundation and as a trustee, National Gallery of Victoria, a board member, Museum of Contemporary Art, Sydney, a member of the advisory board, Melbourne Symphony Orchestra, a member, National Council & Melbourne Committee, The Australian Opera (now Opera Australia), and as a council member, Australian Association of Philanthropy (now Philanthropy Australia). He served on the board of Myer from when it was separated from Coles Myer Limited in 2006 until 2015.

== Awards and honours ==
Myer became a member of the Order of Australia in January 2005 for service to the arts, for support of museums, galleries, and the community through a range of philanthropic and service organisations. He was made an officer of the Order of Australia in 2015.
