= Malthouse Theatre =

Theatre in Melbourne, Australia

- Formation: 1976
- Founders: Carrillo Gantner, Graeme Blundell and Garrie Hutchinson
- Type: Theatre group
- Location: Melbourne
- Artistic director: Dean Bryant
- Website: malthousetheatre.com.au
- Formerly called: Hoopla!, Playbox Theatre Company
The Malthouse
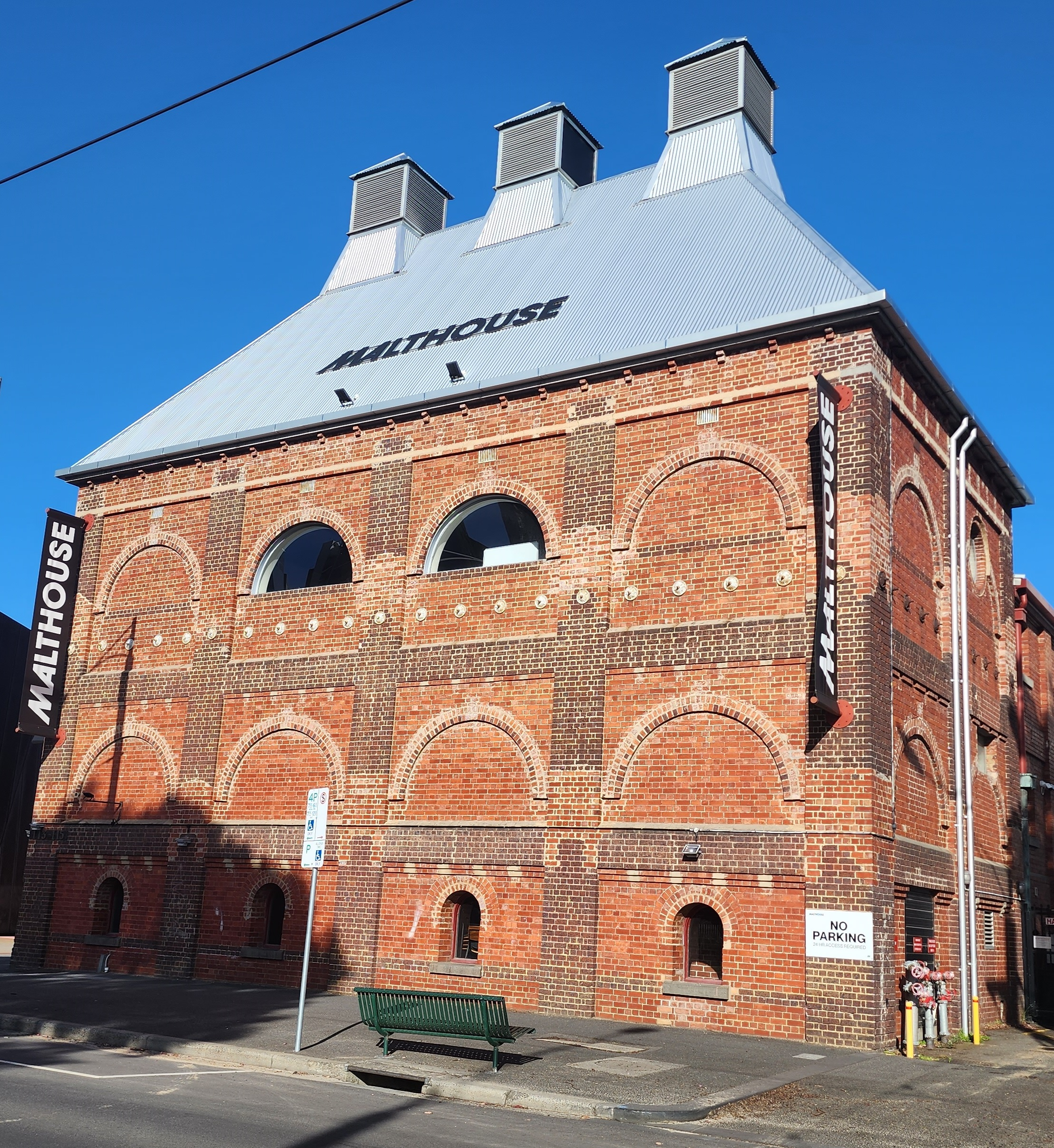
- View from Sturt Street
- Interactive map of The Malthouse
- Address: 113 Sturt St; Southbank, Victoria; Australia
- Coordinates: 37.827°S 144.9665°E
- Capacity: Merlyn Theatre: 500; Beckett Theatre: 175; The Tower: 100
Construction
- Opened: 1990; 36 years ago

Malthouse Theatre is the resident theatre company of The Malthouse building in Southbank, part of the Melbourne Arts Precinct. In the 1980s it was known as the Playbox Theatre Company and was housed in the Playbox Theatre in Melbourne's CBD. It is a heritage-listed building which contains three theatres: Merlyn Theatre, Beckett Theatre, and The Tower.

A multidisciplinary contemporary theatre, Malthouse Theatre produces and/or presents many productions annually, from drama and comedy to contemporary opera, music theatre and cabaret, to contemporary dance and physical theatre. The Company regularly co-produces with local and national performing arts companies and tours nationally and internationally.

Malthouse Theatre productions have been performed internationally including Solaris, a new play by David Greig adapted from Stanisław Lem’s novel at The Royal Lyceum Theatre in Edinburgh, in 2019 and Picnic at Hanging Rock, in 2018 adapted by Tom Wright and directed by Matthew Lutton at the Barbican Centre in London.

Nationally touring works include Wake in Fright in 2019, adapted from Kenneth Cook’s novel by Declan Greene with Zahra Newman, and Cloudstreet adapted by Nick Enright and Justin Monjo from the novel by Tim Winton.

== History ==
Malthouse Theatre had its beginnings as ‘Hoopla!’ in 1976 when Carrillo Gantner AC, Graeme Blundell and Garrie Hutchinson formed the Hoopla Theatre Foundation. In 1980 the name was changed to Playbox Theatre Company after moving to the Playbox Theatre at 55 Exhibition Street, before it was destroyed by fire in 1984. In 2004, Michael Kantor reimagined Playbox as Malthouse Theatre after the historic venue that has been the company's home since 1990.

== Malthouse building ==
=== Original uses ===
The Malthouse was built in 1882 by the Castlemaine Brewery, then one of the largest in Australia, to supply its brewery on nearby Queensbridge Street. The building was constructed by Nicholas and Edward Fitzgerald, with their managing director J.B. Perrins to establish the South Melbourne Branch of the Castlemaine Brewery. It was built in the Victorian Industrial era and style.

The three-storey malthouse building was converted into a theatre in the 1980s. On the front facing façade, blind arcading were modified to create window openings on the second floor level. A steel roof with unique ventilation monitors tops the building.

Other important features include unpainted decorative bricks with contrasting colours for pilasters and horizontal banding at first and second floor levels, which create a visual separation between floors. However, on the side elevation, the brickwork is uniform across all pilasters and banding.

It was later leased to Barrett Bros & Burston & Co., who also operated the large malting works on the Yarra River in Richmond. By the 1970s it had ceased operating and had been painted white and lost much of its architectural detail.

=== As theatre ===
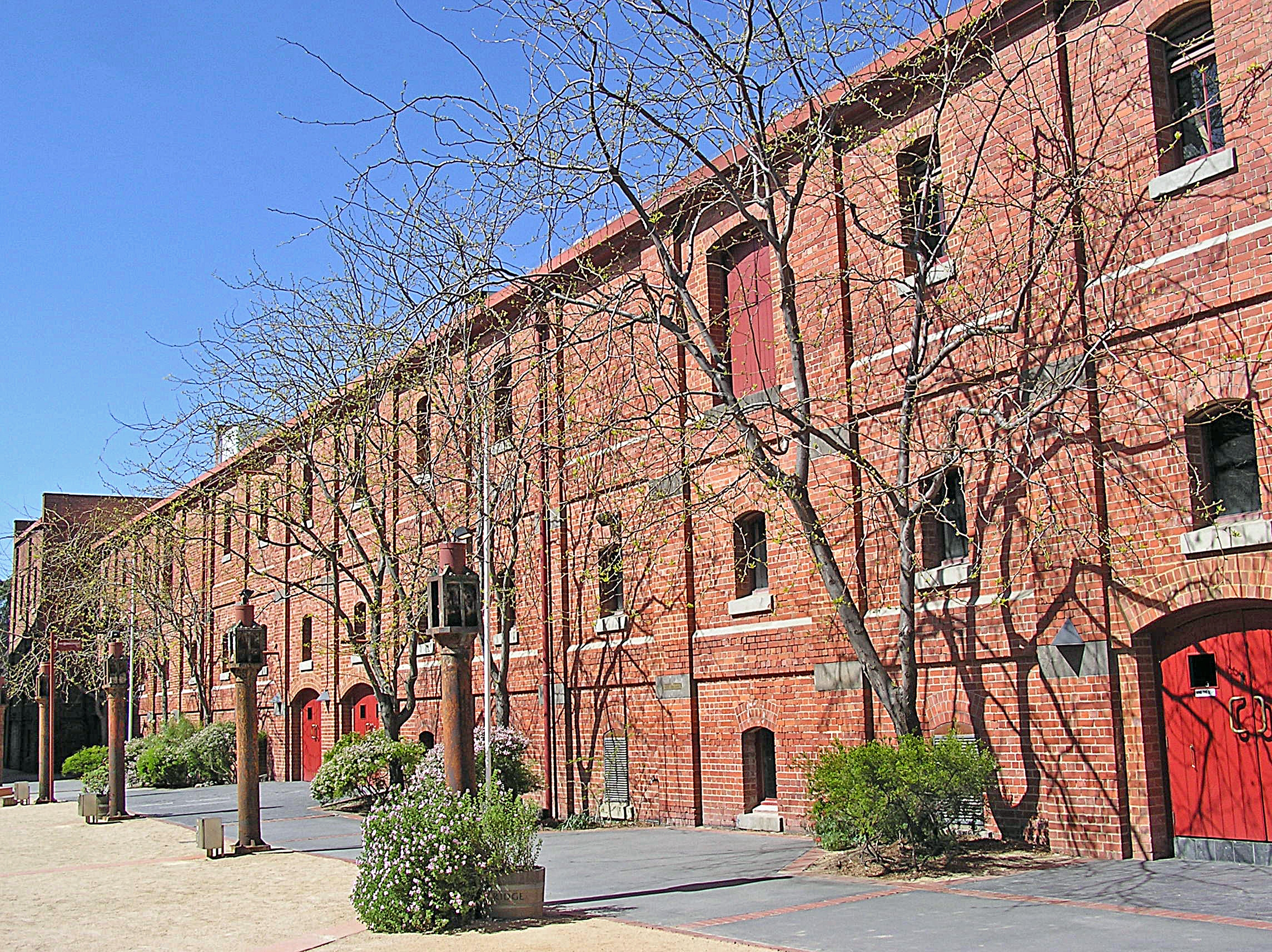
The building from The Malthouse's Courtyard

In 1986 owners Carlton & United Breweries donated the building to Playbox Theatre Company to refurbish as their permanent home. After years of fundraising and construction, The CUB Malthouse theatre complex opened officially on 25 August 1990. The Beckett Theatre had opened on 16 March 1990 with The Forty Lounge Cafe by Tes Lyssiotis, and the Merlyn Theatre on 28 May 1990 with Cafe Fledermaus by Robyn Archer.

The Malthouse is a heritage-listed building and contains several indoor and outdoor spaces. This includes three theatres: the 500-seat Merlyn Theatre (named after philanthropist Merlyn Myer); the 175-seat Beckett Theatre (named after designer John Beckett); and the 100-seat flexible space, The Tower. Directly outside is The Malthouse's Courtyard, and a forecourt which is shared with the Australian Centre for Contemporary Art (ACCA), Chunky Move and the Victorian College of the Arts. Malthouse Theatre's scenic workshop is located in the neighbouring ACCA building, completed in 2002, which also includes rehearsal spaces for Chunky Move, a Melbourne-based contemporary dance company.

The Malthouse venue hosts over 100 external hirer events annually ranging from festivals, performances, conferences, rehearsals and workshops. This includes large-scale festivals such as RISING and Yirramboi. Since 2016, The Malthouse has been a part of the Melbourne International Comedy Festival.

== Artistic team ==
Malthouse Theatre's core artistic team is currently led by Executive Producer & Co-CEO, Vivia Hickman and Artistic Director & Co-CEO, Dean Bryant. The team also includes Annie Bourke (Senior Producer), Rhys Velasquez (Casting Director), Erica Browne (Producer), Keziah Warner (New Work Associate, Dramaturg) and Jessica Arthur (New Work Associate, Artist Development).

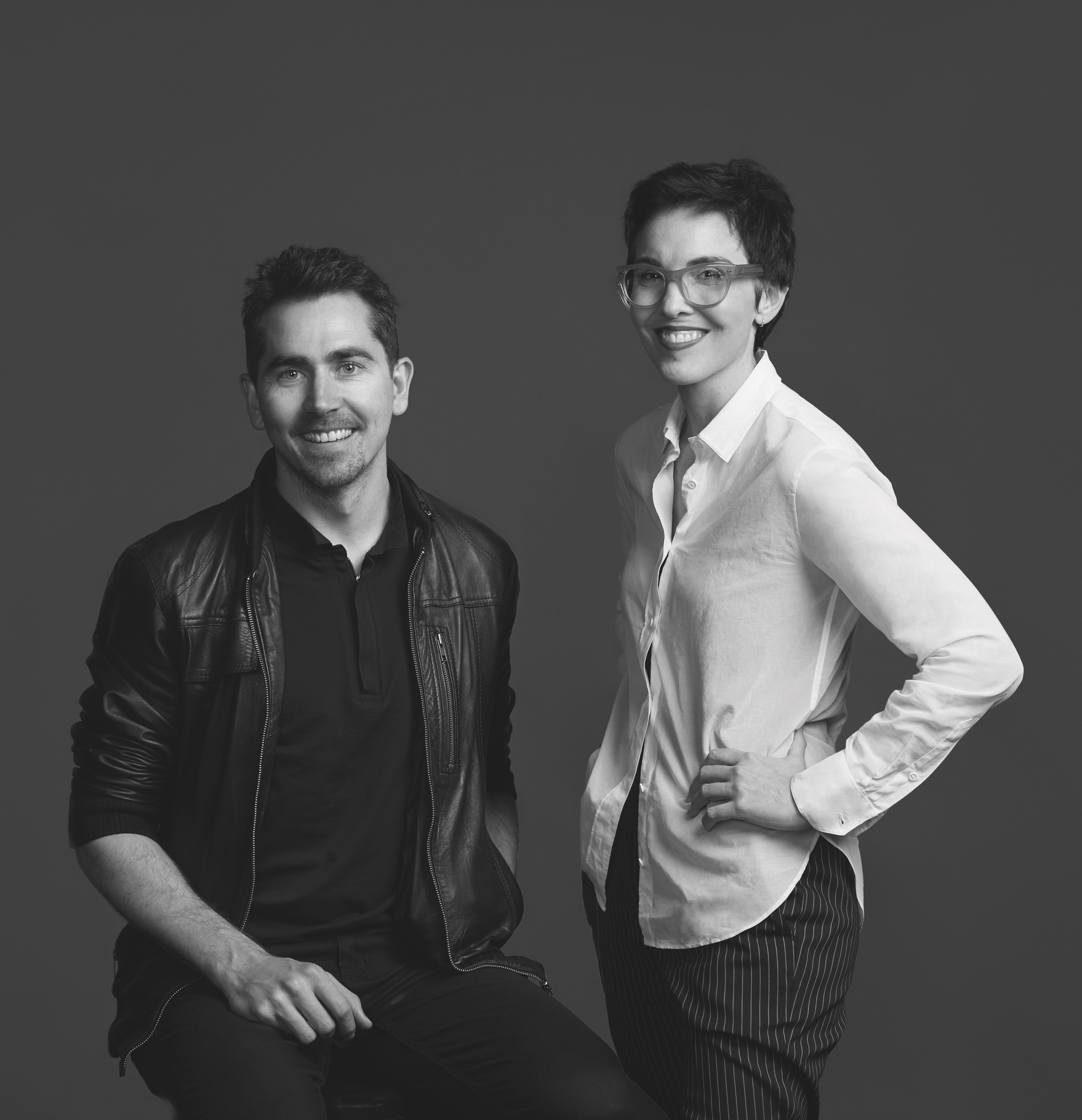
Co-CEOs Matthew Lutton & Sarah Neal

== Board of directors and artistic directors ==
Malthouse Theatre's board members (in 2026) include: Jacob Varghese (Chair), Jada Alberts, Jennifer Darbyshire, Dr Anna Foley, Alison Whyte, Alan Wong.

Artistic directors have included:

- November 2025 - ongoing Dean Bryant
- 2015 – February 2025 Matthew Lutton
- 2010 – 2015 Marion Potts
- 2004 – 2010 Michael Kantor (chair of Melbourne Fringe as of March 2025)
- 1993 – 2004 Aubrey Mellor
- 1988 – 1993 Carrillo Gantner
