= Adrienne Clarke =

Australian botanist

Adrienne Clarke AC FAA FTSE

Chancellor of La Trobe University
- In office 26 February 2011 – 26 February 2017
- Preceded by: Sylvia Walton
- Succeeded by: Richard Larkins

Lieutenant Governor of Victoria
- In office 1997–2000
- Preceded by: Sir James Gobbo
- Succeeded by: Lady Southey

Chair of the CSIRO
- In office 5 December 1991 – 4 December 1996
- Preceded by: Neville Wran
- Succeeded by: Charles Allen

Personal details
- Born: Adrienne Elizabeth Petty; 6 January 1938 (age 88) Melbourne, Victoria
- Scientific career
- Education: University of Melbourne; Baylor University; University of Michigan
- Spouse: Charles Clarke
- Awards: Officer of the Order of Australia (1991); Companion of the Order of Australia (2004); Fellow of the Australian Academy of Science; Fellow of the Australian Academy of Technological Sciences and Engineering
- Fields: Botany, plant genetics
- Workplaces: University of Auckland; University of Melbourne; CSIRO Australia

Adrienne Elizabeth Clarke AC FAA FTSE (née Petty; born 6 January 1938) is professor emeritus of Botany at the University of Melbourne, where she ran the Plant Cell Biology Research Centre from 1982 to 1999. She is a former chairman of the Commonwealth Scientific and Industrial Research Organisation (CSIRO, 1991–1996), former Lieutenant Governor of Victoria (1997–2000) and former Chancellor of La Trobe University (2011–2017).

== Biography ==
Born in Melbourne, Clarke reports she experienced some sexism as a bright student in the 1950s. She attended Ruyton Girls' School and entered the University of Melbourne in 1955 where she was a resident of Janet Clarke Hall (then still part of Trinity College) reading Science. She graduated with an Honours degree in Biological Sciences in 1959, and gained her PhD in 1963. She married Charles Peter Clarke on 14 August 1959. Hired by Victor Trikojus as a researcher in the Department of Biochemistry, University of Melbourne, she conducted research on beta glucans with Bruce Stone in 1960.

In 1964 she became a research fellow at the United Dental Hospital of Sydney, then moved to Baylor University in Houston and the University of Michigan, later teaching at the University of Auckland. She worked at the University of Melbourne as Research Fellow (1969–1977), then lecturer, senior lecturer and reader before being appointed Professor of Botany in 1985 and Laureate Professor in 1999. She retired from the university in 2005.

Clarke is a former chairman of CSIRO (1991–1996) and a former Lieutenant Governor of Victoria (1997–2000). She is a Fellow of Janet Clarke Hall at the University of Melbourne. In 2010 she joined the La Trobe University Council, and succeeded Sylvia Walton as Chancellor of La Trobe University on 26 February 2011.

She has also been involved in the commercial sector; she was a director of a number of public companies and sat on a number of boards, including Western Mining, Alcoa, Fisher and Paykel, Woolworths and the AMP Society. She was also a member of the Australian Advisory Board of the Global Nature Conservancy. In 1998, in association with three University of Melbourne colleagues, she founded the agribusiness Hexima.

== Contributions ==
Clarke's scientific work provided critical insight to the biochemistry and genetics of flowering plants, their reproduction, and their growth. It led to industrial applications for next-generation controls of insect pests and fungal disease of crops. Her team was the first to clone the gene which regulates self-compatibility in plants and the first to clone the "c" DNA of an arabinogalactan protein.

She describes her expertise as:

- The molecular basis of self-incompatibility
- The chemistry and biology of a class of proteoglycans, the arabinogalactan-proteins
- Proteinase Inhibitors and their use in control of insect development

She is co-editor of major scientific books dealing with chemistry, cell biology and genetics.

== Honours and awards ==
- 1991 Fellow of the Australian Academy of Science (FAA)
- Fellow of the Australian Academy of Technological Sciences and Engineering (FTSE)
- 1991 Officer of the Order of Australia (AO)
- 1992 Mueller Medal, ANZAAS
- 1993 Outstanding Achievers Award, National Australia Day Council
- 2001 Centenary Medal
- 2001 Victorian Honour Roll of Women
- 2004 Companion of the Order of Australia (AC)
- Foreign Associate of the National Academy of Sciences (USA)
- Foreign Member of the American Academy of Arts and Sciences (USA)

Government offices
Preceded by Sir James Gobbo	Lieutenant-Governor of Victoria; 1997–2000	Succeeded by Marigold Southey
Business positions
Preceded by Neville Wran	Chair of the CSIRO; 1991–1996	Succeeded by Charles Allen
Academic offices
Preceded by Sylvia Walton	Chancellor of La Trobe University; 2011–2017	Succeeded by Richard Larkins
