= Emporium Melbourne =

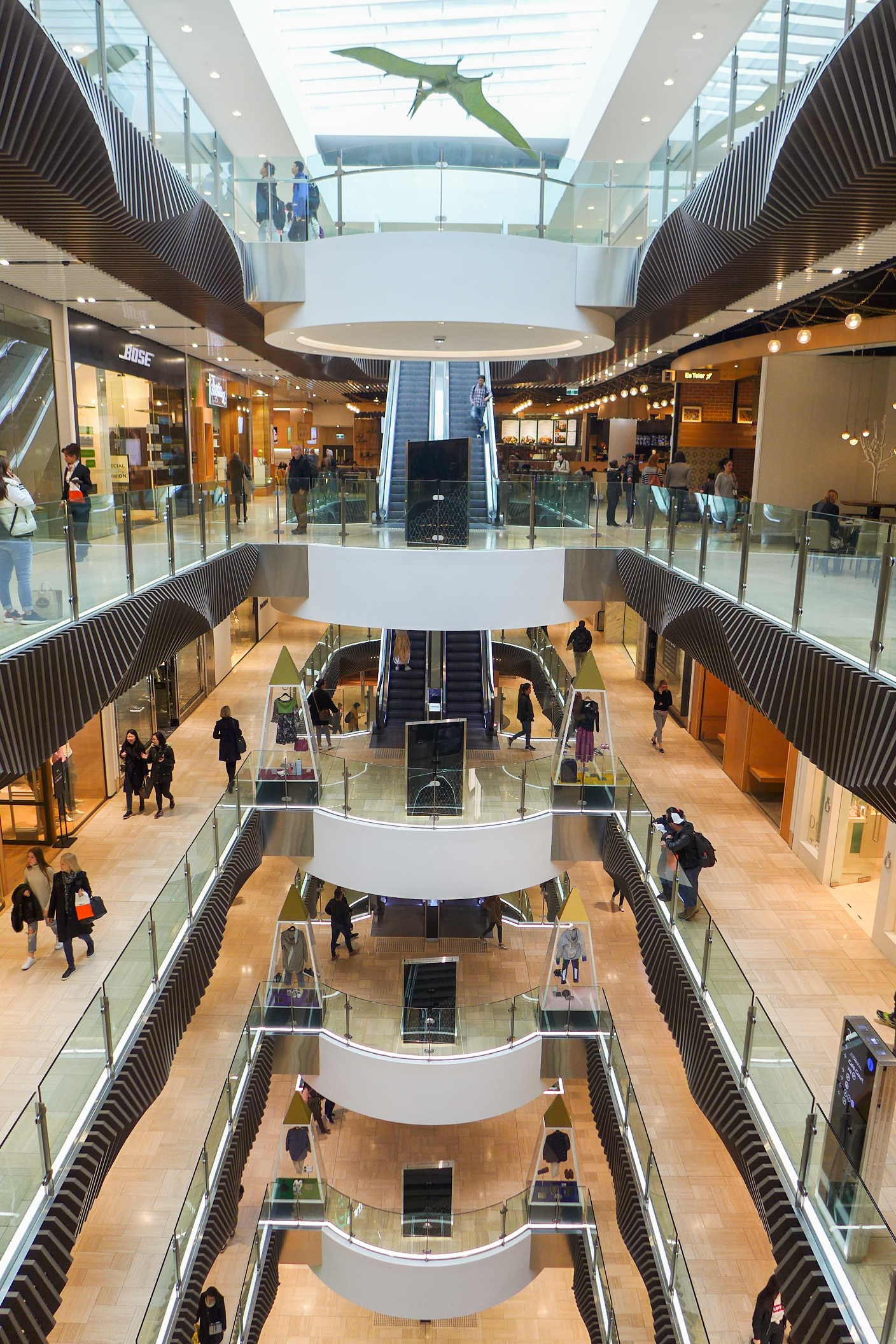
- Atrium of the mall
- Location: Melbourne, Victoria, Australia
- Coordinates: 37.8124°S 144.9638°E
- Address: 287 Lonsdale Street
- Opened: 16 April 2014; 12 years ago
- Developer: Vicinity Centres
- Manager: Vicinity Centres
- Architect: NH Architecture
- Num. of stores: 224
- Num. of anchor tenants: 9
- Floor area: 45,241 square metres (486,970 sq ft)
- Floors: 8
- Website: emporiummelbourne.com.au

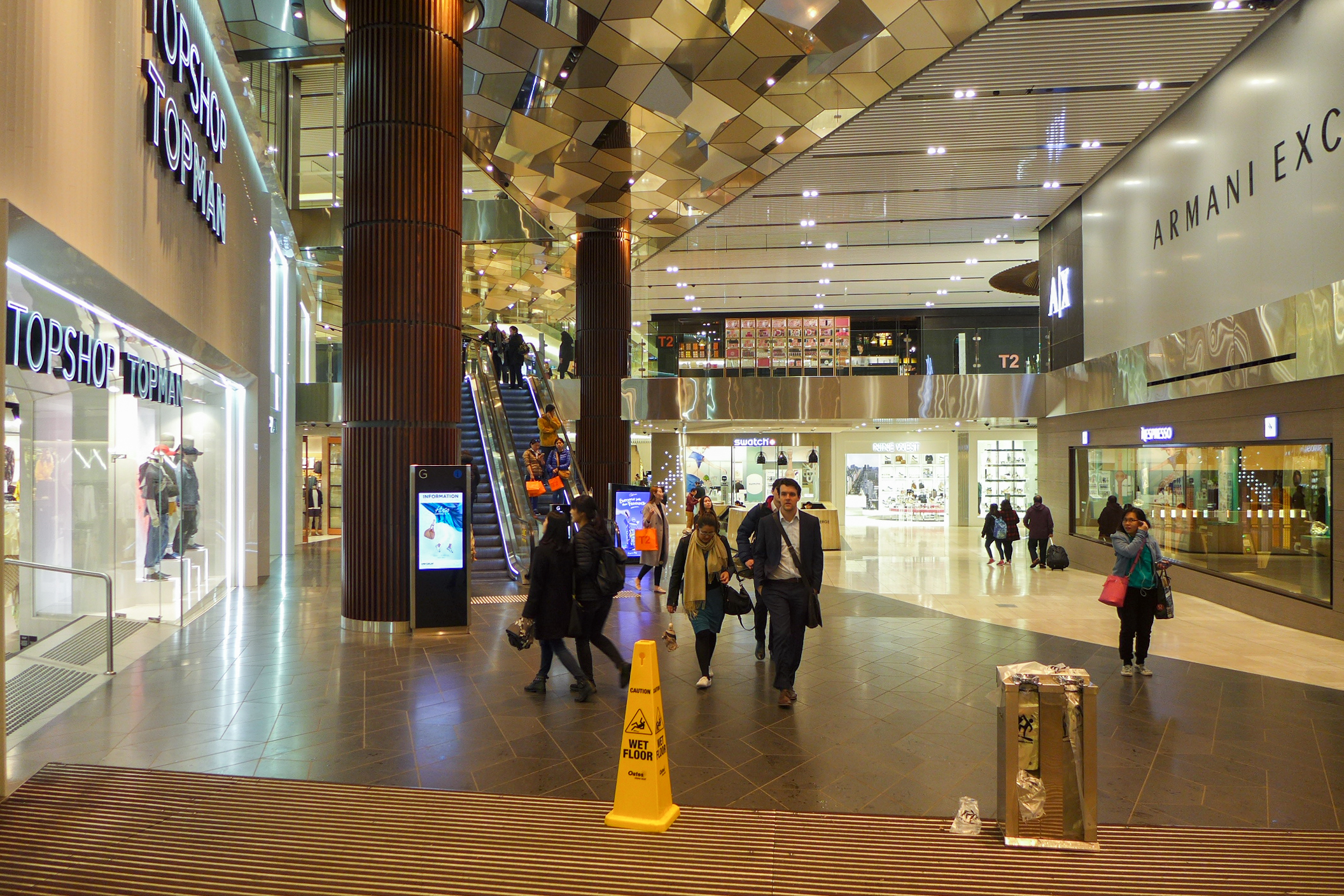
Mall Entrance

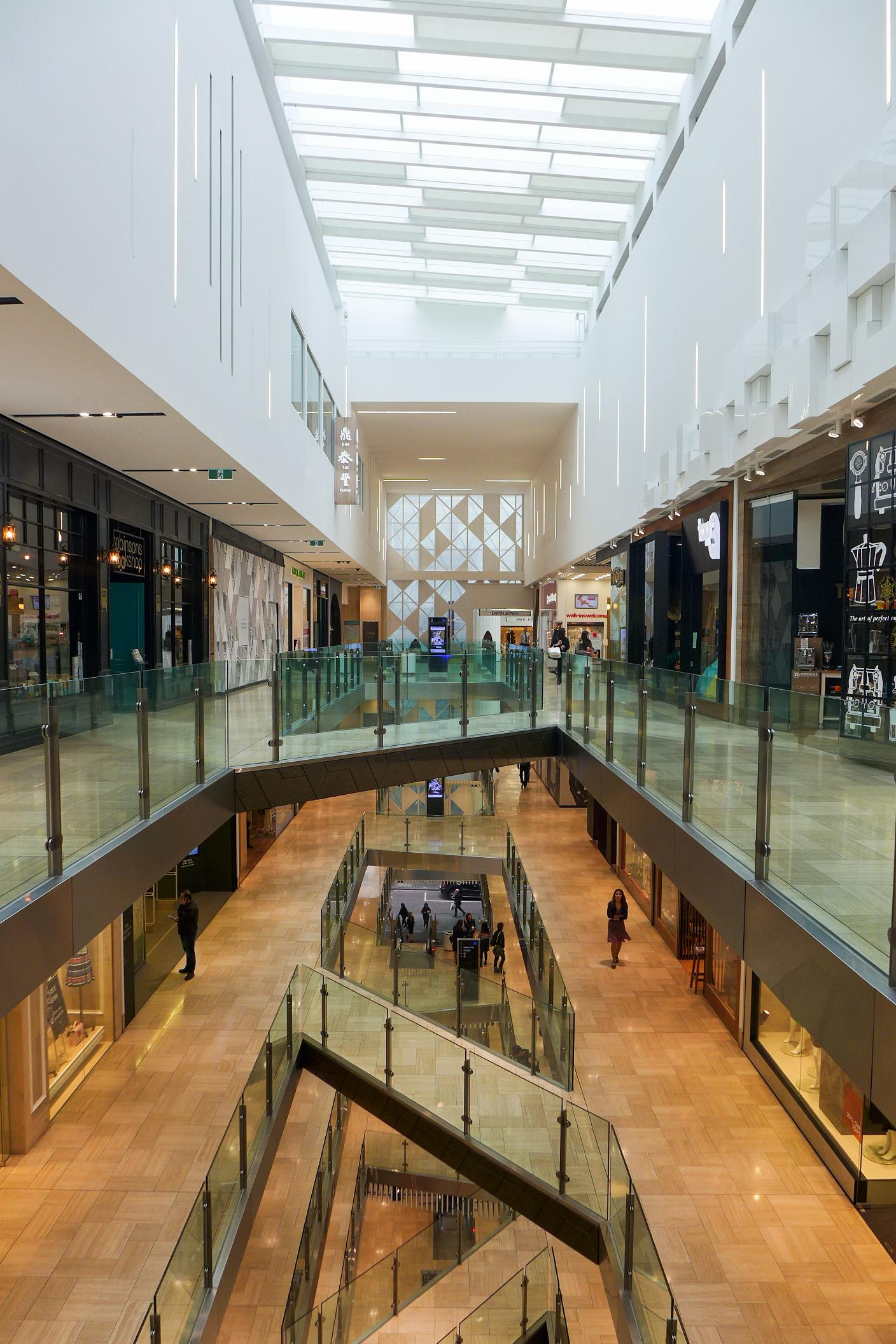
Mall Atrium linked to David Jones

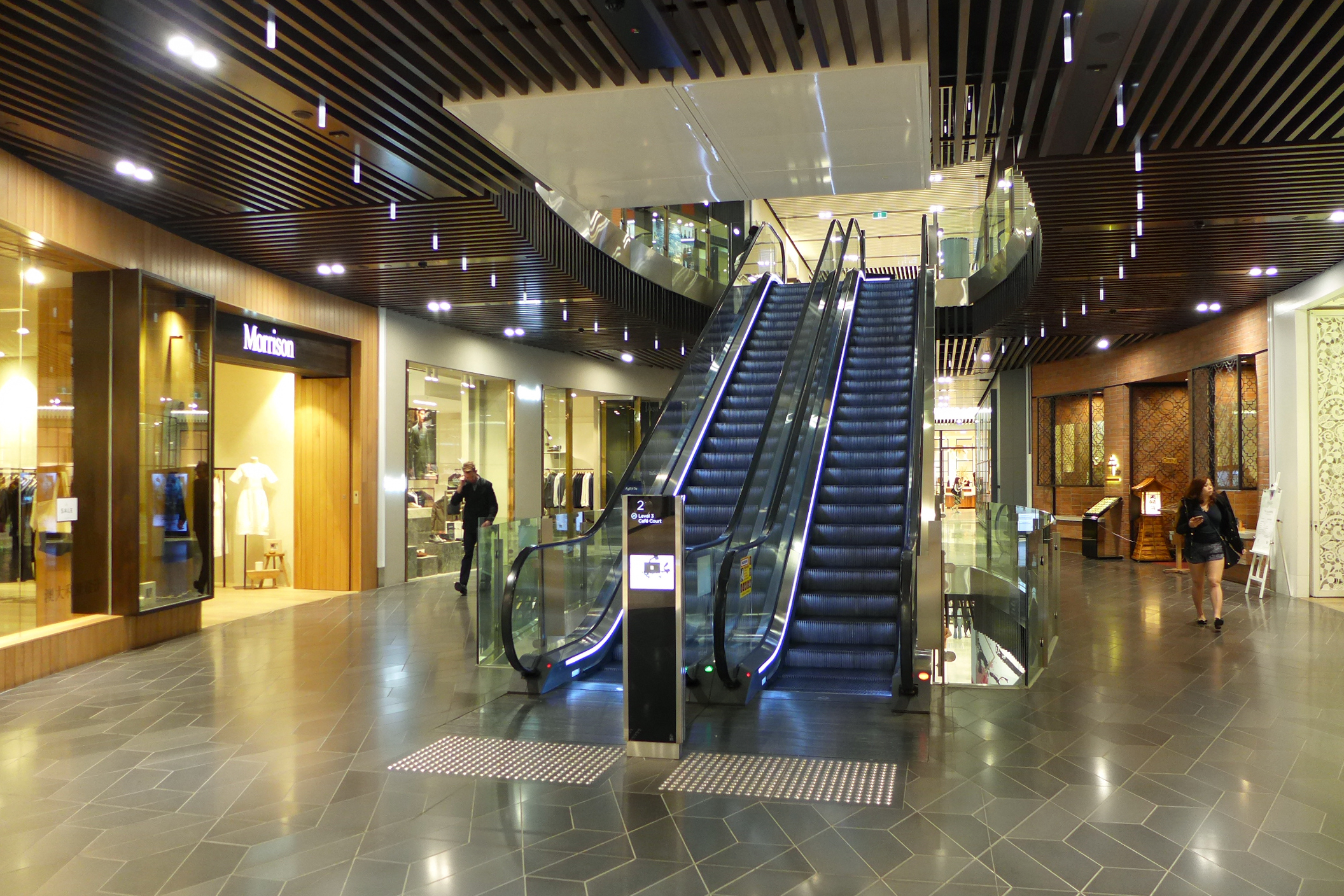
Level 2 Shops

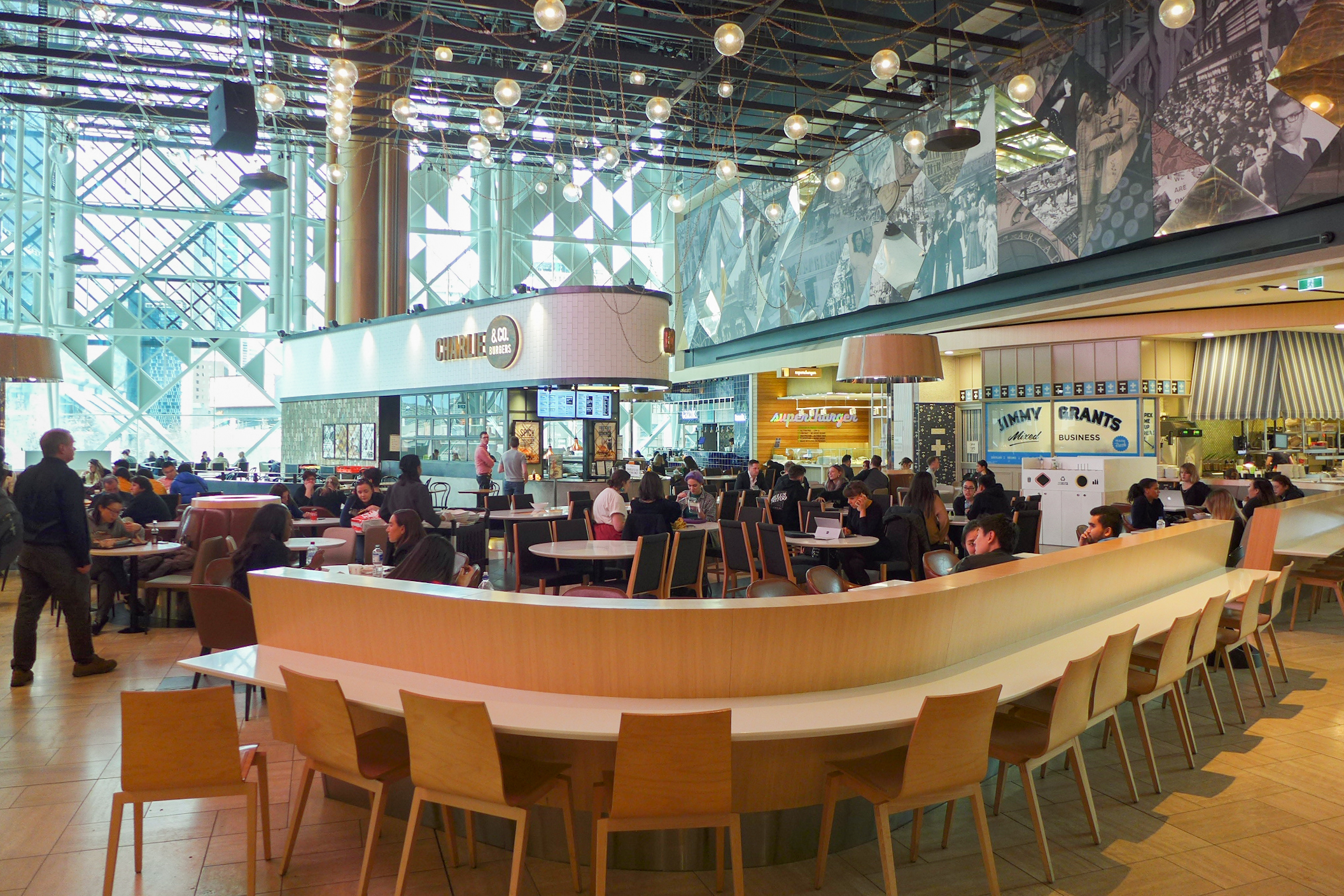
Level 3 Food Court

Emporium Melbourne (or simply Emporium) is a luxury shopping centre on the corner of Lonsdale and Swanston streets in Melbourne, Victoria, Australia. Occupying the former Lonsdale Street site of Myer's Melbourne store, Emporium opened in 2014 following extensive redevelopment. The centre includes a food court, specialty stores and several multi-level anchor retailers. Emporium forms part of a 188,000 square metres (2,020,000 sq ft) precinct of linked shopping centres in the Melbourne central business district, which also includes the Myer and David Jones city stores, Melbourne Central, General Post Office and Elizabeth Street's The Strand.

== History ==
From 1911 to 1934, Melbourne businessman Sidney Myer acquired and constructed 10 buildings between Lonsdale and Bourke streets in the central city while establishing his Myer chain of department stores. The first new building was completed facing Bourke Street in 1914, and the 8-storey structure was named the "Myer's Emporium". In 1925, work began on a new, 11-storey building facing Lonsdale Street, designed by H.W. and F.B. Tompkins and influenced by Classical and Beaux-Arts architectural styles. One of the first employees was Adeline Keating who rose to be Chief Buyer and the most highly paid business woman in Australia. She toured the world and once a year she would create a special display for Christmas in the store.

This structure incorporated parts of previous buildings, which resulted in a complex layout and multiple mezzanine levels. In 1962, a pedestrian bridge was constructed between first, second and third storeys (Note: In Australian English, this refers to the first, second and third floors above ground level.) of the Bourke Street and Lonsdale Street buildings.

In March 2007, Myer announced plans to close the Lonsdale Street store as part of a $40 million redevelopment in which it would sell both buildings and lease back the Bourke Street store. It was expected by Myer's real estate agents that the Lonsdale Street building would be converted into "a mixed-use development with retail, hotel and serviced-apartment components". By March 2009, the sale had not been finalised, with potential buyer and owner of Melbourne Central GPT Group concerned that the redevelopment of the Lonsdale Street site would interfere with pedestrian flows in the area .

In August of that year, the Victorian Government approved a redevelopment of the Lonsdale Street site as a shopping centre name "Emporium Melbourne". It was speculated that an Apple Store would be the flagship retailer in the new centre, and that the project would be completed by December 2012. Construction commenced in August 2011, by which time developers Colonial First State Global Asset Management hoped for completion by Christmas 2013.

Beginning on 22 August 2012, construction was delayed by strike action by the Construction, Forestry, Mining and Energy Union, who demanded the right for their members to elect shop stewards and display union regalia. The dispute continued when the union refused to comply with a Supreme Court of Victoria order to end the strike and workers from builder Grocon were escorted onto the site by Victoria Police. Despite the union's subsequent threats of a statewide building industry strike, the blockade ended on 7 September when Grocon agreed to further negotiations. The union was eventually forced to pay a $1.25 million fine and $3.5 million in a damages settlement over the incident.

Emporium Melbourne was opened by Premier of Victoria Denis Napthine in April 2014. The final cost of the project was estimated at $1.2 billion. A "gala opening" event in August was directed by Australian film director Baz Luhrmann.

== Current centre ==
Emporium has 224 tenancies across 7 of the building's floors, with an eighth floor containing only management offices. Major tenants include Din Tai Fung, Muji, Genesis Studio, lululemon, Uniqlo, Victoria's Secret and Rebel. Other key tenants include Furla, Polo Ralph Lauren, Arc'teryx, On, Mulberry, Aesop, Nespresso, Oroton, Witchery, Tommy Hilfiger, Hugo Boss, Coach, Marimekko, Zimmermann, Rodd & Gunn, Ganni and Chanel Beauty. Level 4 was entirely occupied by a department of the Bourke Street Myer store, which, like levels Lower Ground, 1, 2 and 3, was connected by a pedestrian bridge to the main Myer building. This extension, opened in May 2014, was marketed as the "Myer Emporium" and described by the company as "the final stage of the transformation of Myer Melbourne". Myer announced in August 2019 it would exit the fourth floor the following year. The space was converted into co-working facilities. In 2023, a Rebel flagship store opened on this level, which became the largest Rebel store in Australia, while the rest of the level’s space retained the co-working facilities. A second footbridge from levels 1, 2, 3 and 4 also connects directly to the David Jones store which occupies the property next to Myer between Bourke and Little Bourke streets.

A food court with approximately 30 food outlets is located on Level 3 and includes mostly independent food outlets. The food court has been described by managers as an attempt to appeal to "discerning" customers and consequently takes inspiration from luxury food courts in Asia.
