= Marigold Southey =

Australian philanthropist

Lady Southey AC

12th Lieutenant-Governor of Victoria
- In office 1 January 2001 – 7 April 2006
- Monarch: Elizabeth II
- Governor: John Landy
- Preceded by: Adrienne Clarke
- Succeeded by: Marilyn Warren

Personal details
- Born: Marigold Merlyn Baillieu Myer; 2 May 1928 (age 98) San Francisco, California, United States
- Spouse(s): Ross Shelmerdine (1950–1979); Sir Robert Southey (1982–1998)
- Parent(s): Sidney Myer and Merlyn Myer
- Education: St Catherine's School, Toorak; University of Melbourne

Marigold Merlyn Baillieu Southey, Lady Southey AC (née Myer; born 2 May 1928) is an Australian philanthropist who served as Lieutenant-Governor of Victoria from 2001 to 2006.

Lady Southey was born in San Francisco into the Myer family, the youngest of four children of Sidney Myer and Dame Merlyn Myer (née Baillieu). She was educated at St Catherine's School, Toorak and the University of Melbourne.

From the mid-1950s until 1999, she was director of the Myer family companies. In 1996, she succeeded her brother, Sidney, as president of the philanthropic Myer Foundation until she resigned in 2004.

On 1 January 2001, Lady Southey was appointed Lieutenant-Governor of Victoria under Governor John Landy.

In 1950, she married Ross Shelmerdine, who died in 1979—they had four children. In 1982, she married businessman and former Liberal Party president Sir Robert Southey, becoming Lady Southey.

Government offices
Preceded by Adrienne Clarke	Lieutenant-Governor of Victoria; 2001–2006	Succeeded by Marilyn Warren
