= Melbourne School of Theology =

Coordinates: 37°51′35″S 145°12′33″E

- Former names: Melbourne Bible Institute; Bible College of Victoria
- Motto: Biblical Depth. Spiritual Formation. Missional Heart
- Type: Tertiary Christian education
- Established: September 1920
- Religious affiliation: Nondenominational Christian Borneo Evangelical Mission
- Academic affiliations: Australian University of Theology
- Principal: Tim Meyers
- Students: 350+
- Location: Melbourne, Australia
- Campus: Wantirna South, Victoria, Melbourne CBD
- Website: mst.edu.au

The Melbourne School of Theology (MST) is an evangelical Christian theological college with its main campus in Wantirna, an eastern suburb of Melbourne, Victoria, Australia. It offers undergraduate and post-graduate programs in biblical studies, pastoral studies, theology and related fields.

The school has a Chinese department, known as MST Chinese, in which undergraduate and graduate courses are taught in both Mandarin and Cantonese which also has a postgraduate research section known as MST Centre for the Study of Chinese Christianity.

In 2011 the main (Wantirna) campus relocated from the suburb of Lilydale in the outer eastern suburbs of Melbourne to its present location. The Chinese department, which used to operate in Box Hill, also relocated to the new campus and was renamed MST Chinese.

== List of principals ==
- C. H. Nash (1920–1942)
- John W. Searle (1944–1963)
- J. Graham Miller (1965–1970)
- Neville Andersen (1971–1980)
- Arthur Cundall (1981–1989)
- David Price (1990–2004)
- Michael Raiter (2006–2011)
- Tim Meyers (2012–2025)
