= Norman Myer =

Australian businessman (1897–1956)

Sir Norman Myer
- Born: Nahum Moshe Baevski; 25 May 1897; Tatarsk, Russia
- Died: 17 December 1956 (aged 59); Toorak, Victoria, Australia
- Education: Wesley College
- Military career
- Allegiance: Australia
- Branch: Australian Imperial Force
- Service years: 1916–1920
- Rank: Lieutenant

Sir Norman Myer (25 May 1897 – 17 December 1956) was an Australian businessman best known for his role in the development of the Myer department store.

== Early life ==
Myer was born Nahum Moshe Baevski in 1897 in Tatarsk Smolensk, Russia. He studied at Ashwick School (run by C. H. Nash) and Wesley College. He enlisted in the Australian Imperial Force in 1916 and served on the Western Front from August 1917 as a driver with the 1st Divisional Ammunition Column. He became a lieutenant in April 1919.

== Honours ==
Myer was made a knight bachelor in May 1956 for services to philanthropy in Victoria.
