= Myer Foundation =

Australian nonprofit organization

The Myer Foundation is a major Australian philanthropic organisation.

== History ==
The Sidney Myer Charitable Trust was established by the will of Sidney Myer, who died in 1934, leaving a portion of his estate for the benefit of the community. Myer's will was proved at £922,000. The most famous philanthropic funding by the Sidney Myer Fund was for the construction of the Sidney Myer Music Bowl in the Kings Domain, Melbourne in 1958, which is named in his honour.

In 1959, The Myer Foundation was established by Sidney's sons, Baillieu and Ken Myer – their sisters, Neilma Gantner and Lady Southey, became founding members. The Myer Foundation was established in order to award grants in sectors not covered by Sidney Myer's will. The Myer Foundation was endowed in 1992, after Ken Myer died, leaving most of his estate to the foundation.

The fund and foundation have been supported by four generations of Myer family members. In 2011, Carrillo Gantner AC, grandson of Sidney Myer through Sidney's daughter Neilma Gantner, was chair of the fund, while Martyn Myer AO, Sidney's grandson through Ken Myer, was president of the Myer Foundation.

In 2017, the foundation collaborated with the Tim Fairfax Family Foundation and the Keir Foundation in creating an initiative called A New Approach, to address a gap in up-to-date and accurate research and data about arts and cultural philanthropy.

== Governance ==
As of November 2022, members of the Myer family involved in the governance of the foundation and fund include:

- Andrew Myer AM: chair of Sidney Myer Fund (since 2020)
- Sidney Myer AM: trustee
- Sally Lindsay: trustee
- Anna Foley: trustee
- Rupert Myer AO: president of the Myer Foundation (since 2020)
- Emily Myer: vice-president
- Lady Southey AC: life governor
- Carrillo Gantner AC, life governor
- Martyn Myer AO: life governor

== Awards and fellowships ==
Sidney Myer Performing Arts Awards were created by the Sidney Myer Fund trustees in 1984, to commemorate the 50th anniversary of the death of Sidney Myer. As of 2022 there are three awards, given annually: an Individual Award (A$60,000), a Group Award (A$90,000) and a Facilitator's Prize (A$25,000).

The Sidney Myer Creative Fellowships have been awarded since 2011, and in 2022 awarded the 100th fellowship and hit a total of A$16m. Each of the annual fellowships is awarded to an individual, with no restrictions or required outcomes necessary. From 2011 to 2022, the fellowships were each worth A$160,000. In 2023, the value increased to A$200,000. The fellowships are tax-free and paid over two years, over which time it is expected that the recipients largely remain in Australia. Mid-career Australian artists, arts managers, and "thought leaders" in the humanities are all eligible. The choice of recipients by the selection panel is based on two criteria: outstanding talent, and exceptional courage. Financial hardship is not considered. Many Indigenous Australian creatives have been Sidney Myer Creative Fellows, including Jonathan Jones, Alexis Wright, Ellen van Neerven, Eric Avery, Vernon Ah Kee, and (in 2022) artist Vincent Namatjira.
