= Neilma Gantner =

Australian writer and philanthropist

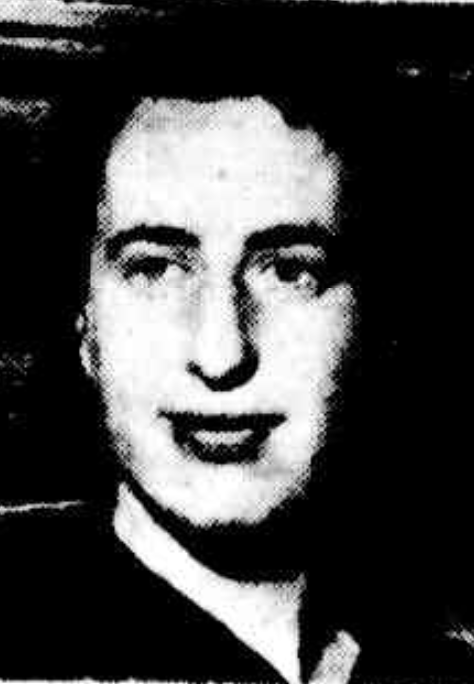
- Born: Neilma Baillieu Myer; 7 November 1922; San Francisco, California
- Died: 15 June 2015 (aged 92); Bermagui, New South Wales, Australia
- Other name: Neilma Sidney
- Occupations: Writer and philanthropist
- Children: Vallejo and Carrillo Gantner
- Family: Sidney Myer (father) Merlyn Myer (mother)

Neilma Bailieu Gantner (7 November 1922 – 15 June 2015) was an Australian philanthropist and author who wrote as Neilma Sidney.

== Early life and education ==
Born in San Francisco, California on 7 November 1922, Neilma Baillieu Myer was the elder daughter of Merlyn (née Baillieu) and Sidney Myer. The family moved back to Melbourne, Australia in 1929. In 1952, following her divorce, she studied for a Bachelor of Arts in English literature and creative writing at Stanford University.

== Career ==
Gantner returned to Melbourne with her two sons in 1954. In 1955 she was a member of the Victorian board of the International Social Service. In mid-1955 she was responsible for signing up hundreds of subscribers to Meanjin, prior to its 15th anniversary. In the same year she self-published her first collection of short stories. Twelve more books followed.

Her elder son, Vallejo, aged 19, was killed in a shooting accident. Gantner subsequently was granted permission to build a hut for bushwalkers in his memory. The Vallejo Gantner Hut is in the Alpine National Park.

In 1991 she founded the biennial Four Winds Festival at Bermagui, bringing classical music performers to the far south coast of New South Wales.

Gantner was a member of The Myer Foundation and other Myer family philanthropic funds.

== Works ==
- Sidney, Neilma (1955), AB initio but ne illegitimi haec legant, N. Sidney
- — (1959), Saturday afternoon and other stories, F. W. Cheshire
- —; Williams, Margaret; Western Australian Teaching and Curriculum Collection (1964), Beaches, Oxford University Press
- — (1966), Beyond the bay (1st ed.), F. W. Cheshire
- — (1970), The eye of the needle, Lloyd O'Neil, ISBN 978-0-85550-021-4
- — (1970), November in India, Community Aid Abroad
- — (1976), The return, Thomas Nelson (Australia), ISBN 978-0-17-005082-1
- — (1986), Journey to Mourilyan: A coastal pilgrimage, J.M. Dent, ISBN 978-0-86770-044-2
- — (1988), Sunday evening : stories, McPhee Gribble/Penguin, ISBN 978-0-14-011547-5
- — (1993), The sweet cool south wind, Barragga Books, ISBN 978-0-646-13402-4
- — (1994), Isola, N. Sidney
- —; Yi, A. (illustrator) (2009), The tale of Henrietta the hen and Pepe, a sea cat, Black Jack Press, ISBN 978-0-9806069-1-1
- —; Yi, Ann (illustrator) (2015), My travelling life, St Kilda, [Victoria] Oryx Publishing, ISBN 978-0-9924865-1-8

== Legacy ==
Two awards have been established and named in her honour, the Neilma Sidney Short Story Prize and the Neilma Sidney Literary Travel Fund, supported by The Myer Foundation. In June 2026, shortly after announcement of the 14th round of recipients, Writers Victoria advised the closure of the travel fund.

== Personal ==
At 18 Gantner married Vallejo Gantner, an apparel manufacturer in San Francisco on 8 August 1941 at St John's Church, Toorak. Her younger sister, Marigold Myer (later Lady Southey) was bridesmaid.

The couple made their home in San Francisco, where Gantner gave birth to two sons, Vallejo junior in 1942 and Carrillo in 1944. In July 1949 she was granted a divorce from her husband on the grounds of cruelty and, although given physical custody of her sons, was prevented from bringing them to Australia for their education.

Gantner died on 15 June 2015 in Bermagui, New South Wales. She was survived by her son, Carrillo, five grandchildren and three great-grandchildren.
