= C. H. Nash =

English-Australian clergyman

Clifford Harris Nash (16 December 1866 – 27 September 1958) was an English-Australian clergyman who became the founding principal of the Melbourne Bible Institute (now the Melbourne School of Theology). According to Darrel Paproth, he "dominated evangelicalism in Melbourne between the wars."

== Education and initial ministry ==
Nash was born in Brixton and educated at Oundle School, Corpus Christi College, Cambridge, and Ridley Hall. At Corpus Christ he became an evangelical Anglican and was particularly influenced by Brooke Foss Westcott. Nash taught at the Loretto School before being ordained a priest in 1893. According to the Australian Dictionary of Biography, "two years later Nash's promising career was curtailed because it was alleged that while engaged to his vicar's daughter he had made advances to her younger sister." He subsequently emigrated to Australia and worked in Tasmania for two years before resuming his ministry in Sydney. He was relicensed by Bishop Saumarez Smith and spent two years there before moving to Victoria in 1900.

== Controversy in Victoria ==
Nash was vicar of St Columb's Anglican Church, Hawthorn, from 1900 to 1906. He was popular and successful, and appeared on his way to becoming a bishop: he was made canon of St Paul's Cathedral, Melbourne in 1903, and in 1906 was on the short list to become the second Bishop of Bendigo. He accepted the incumbency at Christ Church, Geelong in 1906, but the following year disaster struck: Nash was forced by Archbishop Lowther Clarke to resign due to another indiscretion with a female parishioner, this time at Hawthorn. Wei-Han Kuan notes, however, that "Nash's evangelical supporters were vocal, active, and sustained in support of him." Paproth suggests the sour relationship between Nash and Clarke reflected the division in the diocese between evangelicals and non-evangelicals.

In 1908, Nash was relicensed by Bishop Arthur Pain of Gippsland and became rector of St Paul's, Sale, and archdeacon of Gippsland. In 1909 John Norton wrote a newspaper article attacking Clarke for his role in the affair, but the publicity from a subsequent libel case forced Nash to resign from the Anglican Church in 1912. (He was relicensed by Clarke's successor, Harrington Lees, in 1926.)

== Melbourne Bible Institute ==
Nash ran his own school (called Ashwick School) from 1913 to 1915, and pastored Prahran Independent Church (which belonged to the Congregational Union of Australia) from 1915 to 1920. He then started the Melbourne Bible Institute and remained principal there until his retirement in 1942. Nash also taught at the City Men's Bible Class, where he "gathered and energized an incredibly influential group of evangelical Melbourne businessmen." This group included his close friend Lee Neil, who was "the prime mover behind the founding of MBI as a necessary institution for the training of overseas missionaries and as an appropriate avenue for the deployment of the exiled Nash's gifts."

== Personal life ==
Nash married Louise Pearse in 1899 and had three sons and three daughters.

== Works ==
- Christ Interpreted (1940)
- The Fourfold Interpretation of Jesus Christ (1946)
