= Ken Myer =

Australian businessman

Ken Myer AC, DSC

Chairman of the Australian Broadcasting Corporation
- In office 1983–1986
- Preceded by: Leonie Kramer
- Succeeded by: David Hill

Personal details
- Born: 1 March 1921 San Francisco, California, United States
- Died: 30 July 1992 (aged 71) Alaska, United States
- Civilian awards: Companion of the Order of Australia

Military service
- Allegiance: Australia
- Branch/service: Royal Australian Navy
- Years of service: 1941–1946
- Unit: HMAS Arunta; HMS Tenacious; HMS Louis; HMS Ursa
- Military awards: Distinguished Service Cross; Mentioned in Despatches

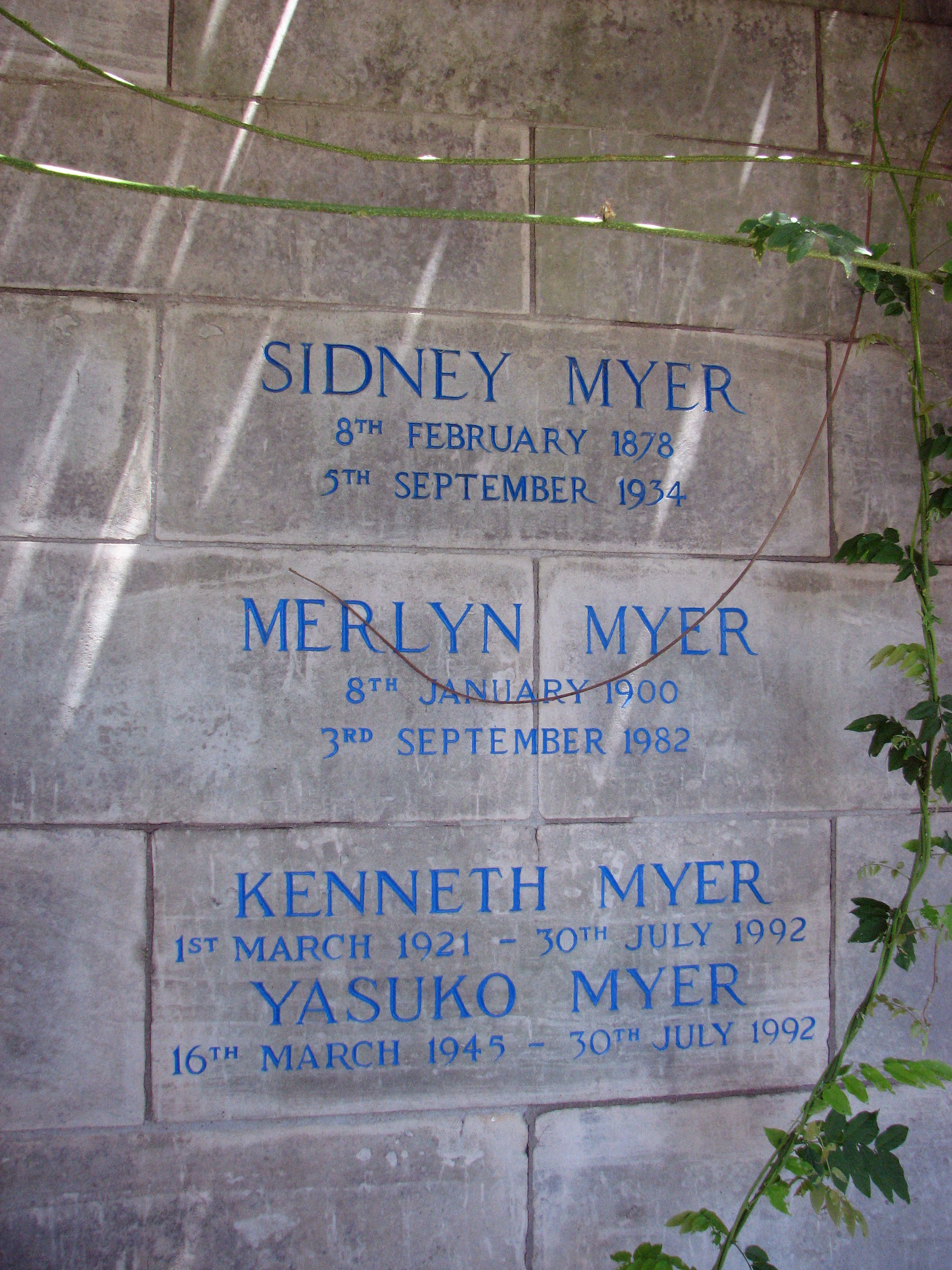
Gravesite, Box Hill Public Cemetery

Kenneth Baillieu Myer, AC, DSC (1 March 1921 – 30 July 1992) was an American-born Australian patron of the arts, humanities and sciences; diplomat, administrator, businessman and philanthropist. He was a member of the notable Melbourne retailing Myer family. Myer made significant philanthropic and personal contributions to the development of major national institutions, most notably the Howard Florey Laboratories of Experimental Physiology and Medicine, the School of Oriental Studies at the University of Melbourne, the Victorian Arts Centre and the National Library of Australia. In 1959, he became Benefactor and Co-Founder of The Myer Foundation with his brother Baillieu Myer AC. He was also the founding chairman of the Australian Broadcasting Corporation.

== Early life and Second World War ==
Ken Myer was born in San Francisco, California, United States in 1921, the eldest son of Sidney Myer, who migrated to Australia from Russia in 1899, then moved to the United States to make his fortune. Sidney Myer had divorced his first wife in Reno, Nevada, but this divorce was not recognised under Australian law. His second wife, (later Dame) Merlyn Myer, travelled to San Francisco for the birth of each of her four children to ensure they would be considered legitimate. The family returned to Australia in 1929 and Myer was educated at Geelong Grammar School, where his strengths were in music, the arts, the classics and languages. His father died at an early age in 1934, when Ken was 13 years of age. He enrolled at Trinity College, the University of Melbourne, for a term in 1939 before being accepted to the University of Oxford but could not attend due to the outbreak of the Second World War. He attended Princeton University for a year, then returned to Australia and served in the Royal Australian Navy (RAN).

Myer was temporarily seconded to the Royal Navy in mid-1943, and rose to the rank of lieutenant. On 15 August 1944, he was awarded a Distinguished Service Cross for his role in an attack by HMAS Arunta on the Japanese submarine Ro-33 that had torpedoed a merchant ship, Malaita, outside Port Moresby. He was also mentioned in despatches in 1944. Later he served in the occupation forces in Shanghai, Hong Kong and Tokyo.

== Career ==
In 1948, Myer became a Director of the Myer Emporium, a role he continued until 1985. He was Deputy chairman and managing director 1960–1966, Chairman 1966–1976, and a non-executive Director 1976–1985. He was also a Director of Coles Myer Ltd 1985–89.

Together with his siblings, Myer brought the Sidney Myer Music Bowl into existence in 1959. Ken Myer donated it to the people of Victoria and Australia, and it was accepted on their behalf by the then prime minister, Robert Menzies.

Myer championed the introduction of freeways and shopping malls to Australia, and was instrumental in setting up the Chadstone Shopping Centre in Melbourne.

In 1972, Myer surprised and to a degree alienated his family by publicly supporting the Australian Labor Party led by Gough Whitlam during the federal election campaign. Labor won government in December 1972 and Whitlam became prime minister. In early 1974, Whitlam offered Ken Myer the opportunity of succeeding Sir Paul Hasluck as Governor-General. He declined, and the post went to Sir John Kerr.

Myer's other activities were extensive and varied. He was:

- Honorary Secretary of the National Gallery Society of Victoria 1948–53
- President of the Town and Country Planning Association of Victoria 1953–1958
- a member of the Victorian Arts Centre Building Committee 1958–80, and chairman 1965–80
- a member of the Interim Council of the National Library of Australia 1960 (at the personal invitation of the then Australian Prime Minister, Robert Menzies)
- a founding member of the statutory Council 1961
- Chairman of the Council 1974–82
- a member of the Australian Universities Commission 1962–65
- a member of the Committee of Economic Inquiry (the first Vernon Committee) 1963–65
- Chairman of the Victorian Arts Centre 1965–89
- a member of the founding Council of the Australian Institute of Urban Studies in 1967
- a member of the interim Council of the Australian National Gallery 1968–71
- a director of the National Retail Merchants Association of the USA 1969–79
- a member of the Australian National Capital Planning Committee 1971–82
- President of the Board of the Howard Florey Institute of Experimental Physiology and Medicine 1971–92
- a member of Australia's first trade mission to China in 1973
- a member of the Committee, chaired by Sir John Crawford, whose unanimous report led to the Australia-Japan Foundation
- Chairman of the Victorian Arts Centre Trust from 1980 to 1989
- founding Chairman of the Australian Broadcasting Corporation 1983–86. This last was one of his few unsuccessful appointments, and it ended in his sudden resignation mid-term; it was widely seen as a reward by Bob Hawke for Myer's support for Gough Whitlam's election in 1972.

Myer successfully fostered new research in organisations such as the Division of Plant Industry of the CSIRO and helped build the Oriental Collection of the Art Gallery of New South Wales. At his death in 1992, he was the greatest collector of Japanese art in Australia.

== Honours and awards ==
Myer won the International Retailers Award in 1970. On Australia Day 1976 he was appointed a Companion of the Order of Australia (AC).

In 1989 the Australian Libraries and Information Association gave Myer its Redmond Barry Award, which goes to a lay person not employed in a library who has rendered outstanding service to the promotion of a library and to the promotion of a library and the practice of librarianship.

In April 1992 Myer was elected to the Fellowship of the Australian Academy of Science, under the provision for special election of people who are not scientists but have rendered conspicuous service to the cause of science.

=== Kenneth Myer Lecture ===
The annual Kenneth Myer Lecture was founded by the Friends of the National Library of Australia in 1990. The inaugural lecturer was Gough Whitlam, and later Kenneth Myer Lecturers have included H. C. Coombs, Dr Davis McCaughey, Emeritus Professor John Mulvaney, Sir Gustav Nossal, Professor Peter C. Doherty, Fred Chaney, Professor Fiona Stanley, Harry Seidler, Tim Costello, Geoffrey Robertson, Michelle Grattan, Professor Tim Flannery, Professor Ian Frazer, Kim Williams, Laura Tingle and Professor Megan Davis.

=== Kenneth Myer Medallion for the Performing Arts ===
The Kenneth Myer Medallion for the Performing Arts was awarded by the Arts Centre Melbourne between 1991 and 2010.

Recipients of the award included Clifford Hocking (inaugural award, 1991); Liz Jones (1994 or 1995); Jenny Kemp and Daniel Keene (1998); Shirley McKechnie and John Romeril; Malcolm Robertson and Mary Kenneally (2000); actor and teacher John Bolton (2002); Bob Sedergreen (2006); choreographer Helen Herbertson (2007); and theatre maker and teacher Robert Draffin (2010).

== Personal life ==
In 1947, Myer married Prudence Boyd (1925–2005) and they had five children: Joanna, Michael, Philip, Martyn and Andrew. Ken and Prudence were divorced in 1977. Ken married Yasuko Hiraoka (16 March 1945 – 30 July 1992) in 1979.

Myer and Yasuko, along with three other people, were killed in a light aircraft crash in Alaska on 30 July 1992.

Martyn Myer is a Life Governor of the Myer Foundation. Andrew Myer is a property developer and film producer. Andrew is Chairman of Sidney Myer Fund and for five years held the position of Director and Co-Vice-President of The Myer Foundation. Joanna Baevsky is a psychologist, and she and Michael Myer were producers, with Andrew Myer, of the 1988 film Radiance.

Media offices
Preceded by Leonie Kramer	Chairman of the Australian Broadcasting Corporation; 1983–1986	Succeeded by David Hill
