= Merlyn Myer =

Australian philanthropist and charity worker

Dame Merlyn Myer DBE
- Born: Margery Merlyn Baillieu; 8 January 1900; Queenscliff, Victoria, Australia
- Died: 3 September 1982 (aged 82); Parkville, Melbourne, Australia
- Education: University of Melbourne
- Occupation: Philanthropist
- Spouse: Sidney Myer (m. 1920; died 1934)
- Children: Ken; Neilma; Baillieu; Marigold

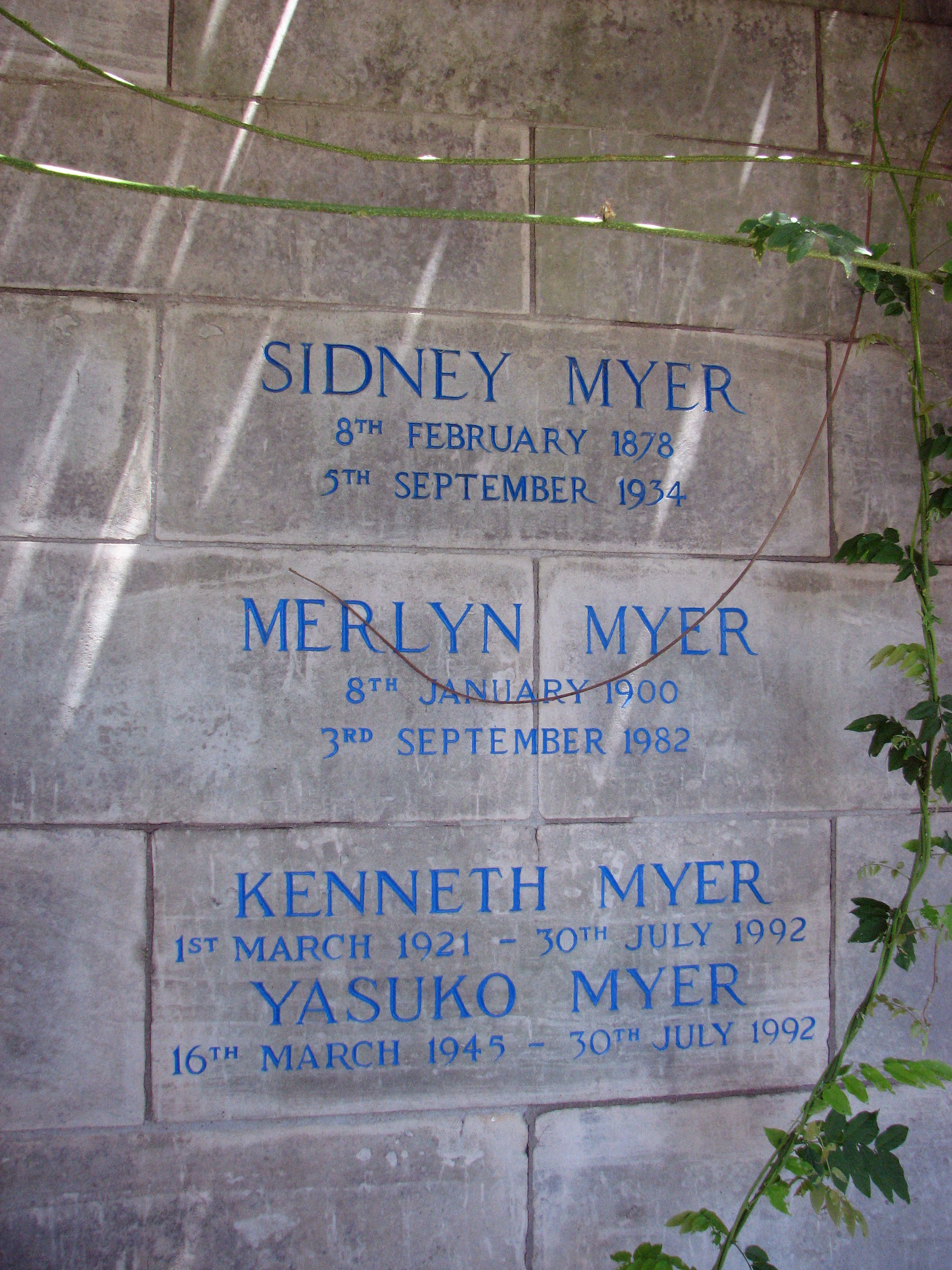
Gravesite, Box Hill Public Cemetery

Dame Margery Merlyn Myer DBE (née Baillieu; 8 January 1900 – 3 September 1982) was an Australian philanthropist, who was notable for her charitable work.

== Birth and marriage ==
Born as Margery Merlyn Baillieu in Queenscliff, Victoria, Australia, to George Francis Baillieu and Agnes Sheehan, a well-to-do couple, she attended Cromarty Girls' School, and the University of Melbourne. On her 20th birthday, 8 January 1920, she married Melbourne retail businessman Sidney Myer; she was his second wife. Her husband, who was originally named Simcha Baevski, arrived in Australia as a penniless Russian immigrant in 1899. He was a businessman and entrepreneur, who founded the Myer retail company.

== Children ==
The couple had four children: Ken, Neilma, Baillieu, and Marigold, all of whom were born in San Francisco, California, United States. The family returned to Australia in 1929, where Sidney Myer died in 1934, leaving Merlyn a 34-year-old widow with four young children.

== Charitable work ==
At the time of his death Sidney was a member of the Board of Management for the Royal Melbourne Hospital and after his death Merlyn was asked to join the Board, on which she continued until 1976. She gave a lot of her time to the hospital. For 10 years from 1937, she was a member of the National Council of the Australian Red Cross Society. Merlyn was a generous benefactor of the Red Cross. She was the motivation for the establishment of the Sidney Myer Music Bowl in 1959, as a gift to the people of Victoria.

The Melbourne Symphony Orchestra was founded with a grant given by the Myers to the University of Melbourne.

== Honours ==
In 1948, Merlyn Myer was appointed an Officer of the Order of the British Empire and on 11 June 1960, was elevated to Dame Commander within the order in recognition of her charitable work. Her title name became Dame Merlyn.

The Merlyn Theatre at the Malthouse Theatre complex in Melbourne was named in her honour to mark the generosity of the Sidney Myer Fund, the Myer Foundation and the individual members of the Myer family who supported the conversion of the Malthouse Theatre.

The Merlyn Myer Music Commission was named in honour of Myer, and is awarded biennially by the Melbourne Recital Centre to a female Australian composer. Composers Sally Greenaway (2015), Andrea Keller (2017), Deborah Cheetham AO (2019), Nat Bartsch (2021) and Brenda Gifford (2023) have previously been commissioned by the award to compose, and have their works recorded and performed at the Melbourne Recital Centre.
