= Sidney Myer =

Australian businessman (1878–1934)

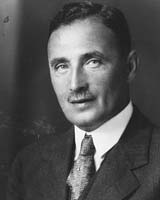
- Born: Simcha Myer Baevski; 8 February 1878; Krychaw, Mogilev Governorate, Russian Empire (present-day Belarus)
- Died: 5 September 1934 (aged 56); Melbourne, Victoria, Australia
- Occupations: Retail businessman, philanthropist
- Known for: Founder of Myer Department Stores
- Spouses: Hannah Nance Flegeltaub (m. 1905; div. 1919) Merlyn Baillieu (m. 1920)
- Children: Ken; Neilma; Baillieu; Marigold

Sidney Myer (born Simcha Myer Baevski (Russian: Симха Майер Баевский, Belarusian: Сімха Маер Баеўскі); 8 February 1878 – 5 September 1934) was a Belarusian-born Australian businessman and philanthropist, best known for founding Myer, Australia's largest chain of department stores.

== Early life ==
Myer was born in Krychaw (Krichev), Mogilev Governorate, Russian Empire (within the Pale of Settlement, present-day Belarus), the youngest of eleven children born to Ezekiel Baevski, a Hebrew scholar, and his wife, Koona Dubrusha (née Shur). He was educated at the Jewish Elementary School in Krichev, and later managed his mother's drapery business. He emigrated to Melbourne in August 1899 with very little money and little knowledge of English to join his elder brother, Elcon Myer (1875–1938), who had left Russia two years earlier.

== Personal life ==
On 8 March 1905, Myer married Hannah Nance Flegeltaub (1868–1963), a cousin of Travers Vale. They had no children, but in 1911 he acted as guardian of his nephew, Norman Myer. In mid-1919, Sidney Myer went to the United States to study retailing. While there he divorced Hannah in Reno, Nevada, although the divorce was not recognised under Australian law.

While in Nevada, Myer also converted to Christianity. As Darrel Paproth notes, however, this was also "the culmination of Lee Neil's witness to him over the years of their friendship and working together."

On 8 January 1920, Myer married (Margery) Merlyn Baillieu (later Dame Merlyn Myer), on her 20th birthday. They had two daughters and two sons: Ken Myer AC (1 March 1921 – 30 July 1992), Neilma (7 November 1922 – 15 June 2015, later Neilma Gantner), Sidney Baillieu Myer AC (11 January 1926 – 23 January 2022), and Marigold Merlyn Baillieu Myer (Lady Southey AC) (born 2 May 1928). Merlyn traveled to San Francisco, California for the birth of each of their four children to ensure they would be considered legitimate.

The Myers returned to Australia in 1929. Ken Myer was a philanthropist, a prime mover behind the Victorian Arts Centre; chairman of the Australian Broadcasting Corporation; and was offered and declined the governor-generalship of Australia. Ken Myer and his brother Baillieu set up the Myer Foundation in 1959. Sidney Baillieu Myer married Sarah June Hordern (born 1935) of the Sydney Hordern retailing family on 15 December 1955, thus linking two of Australia's wealthiest families. Sidney Baillieu Myer and Sarah Hordern had three children: Sid Myer, Rupert Myer and Samantha Hordern Baillieu AM, nee Myer, formerly Bartlett.

One of Myer's granddaughters, Joanna Baevski (the only daughter of Kenneth and Prue (née Boyd) Myer) is a Director of The Myer Foundation. She is Vice-President of the Governance Committee, and a member of the Social Justice Committee, the Water Committee and the Environment Grant Making Committee. She represents The Myer Foundation as a council member of the organisation Our Community, and is a board member of Australians for Just Refugee Programs. A member of Philanthropy Australia, Joanna Baevski is also a supporter of the Victorian Women's Trust.

== Death ==
Myer collapsed and died on Woorigoleen Road, Toorak, a few hundred metres from his home at 'Cranlana', 62 Clendon Road, Toorak on 5 September 1934. The cause of death was given as congestive heart failure. Myer's gravesite, a sepulchre for the reception of urns of ashes, is in Box Hill Public Cemetery in Melbourne. Also interred in the tomb are Dame Merlyn Myer, and Ken Myer and his wife, Yasuko, who perished together in a light aircraft crash in Alaska in 1992. The grave is listed on the Victorian Heritage Register.

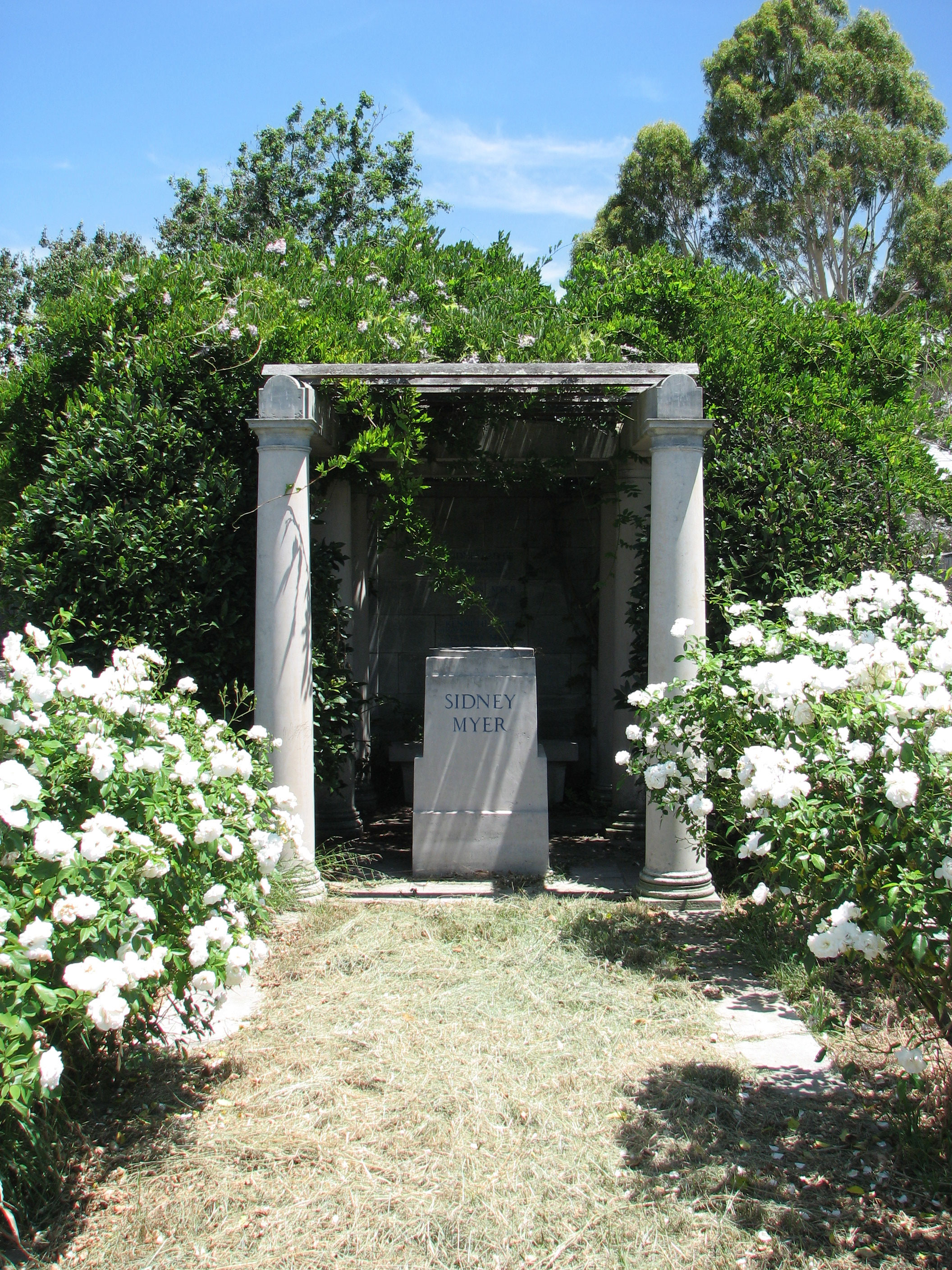
Front approach to the Myer gravesite.

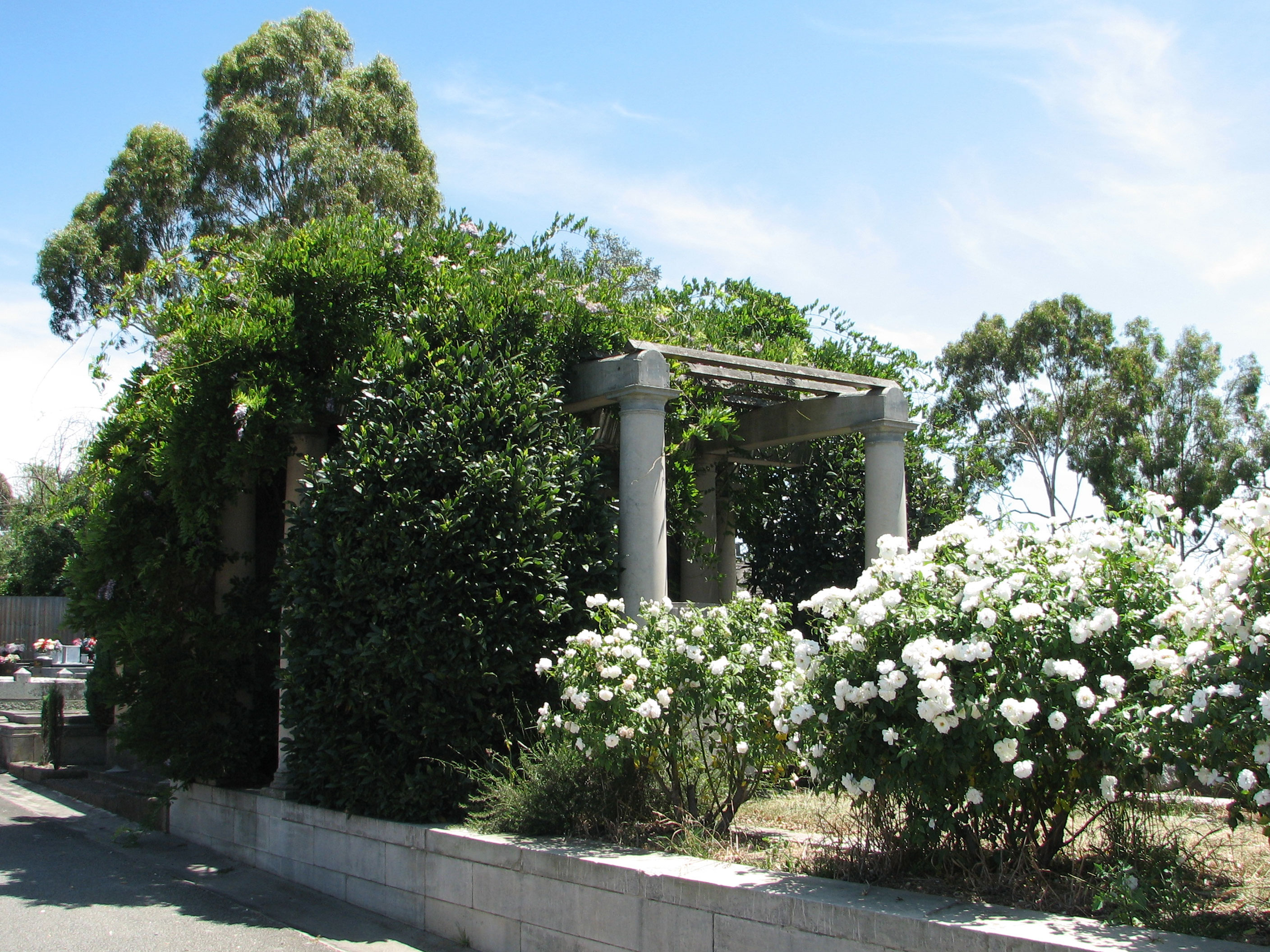
Side view of the Myer gravesite.

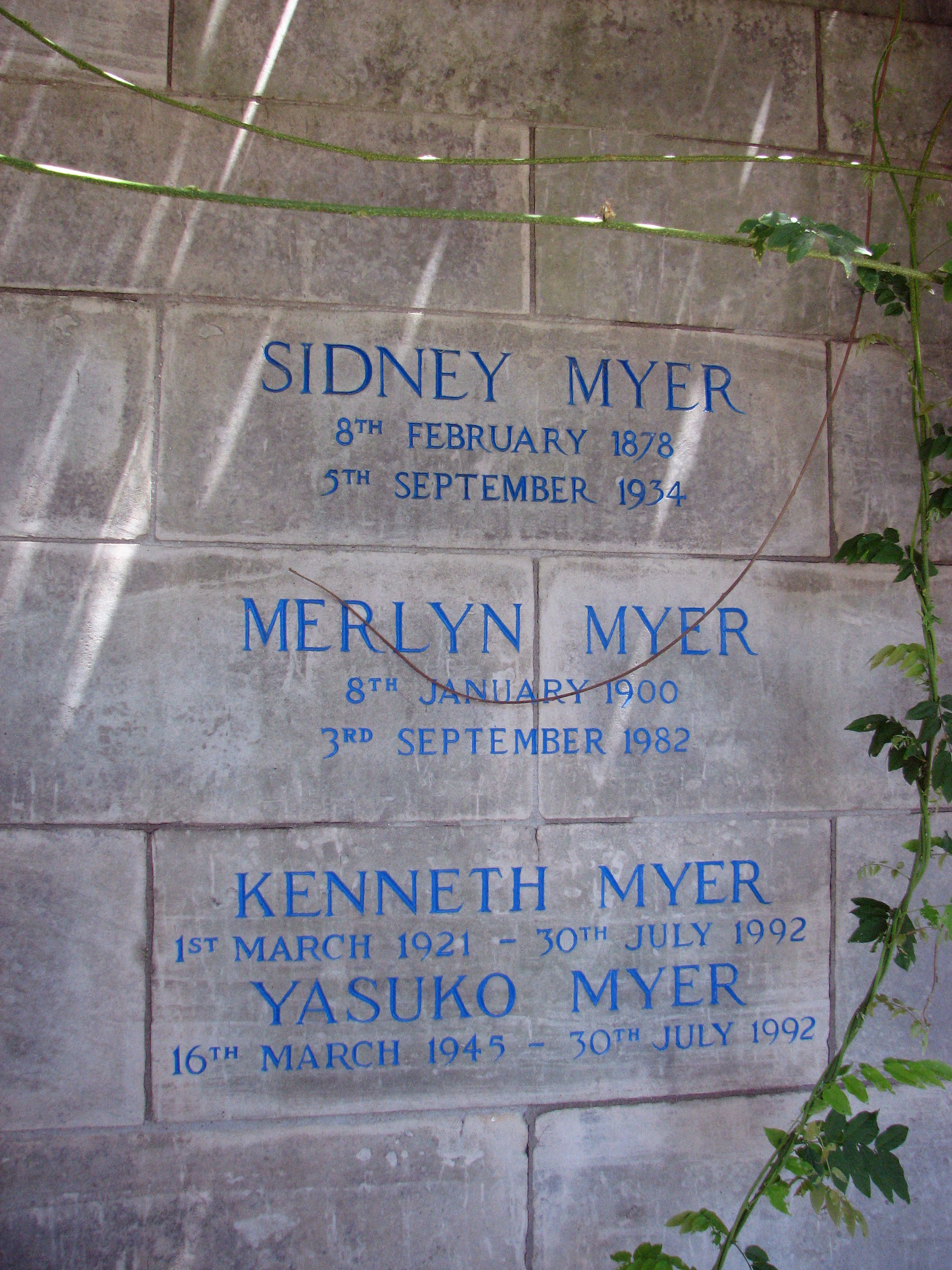
Inscription on the Myer gravesite.

== Philanthropy ==
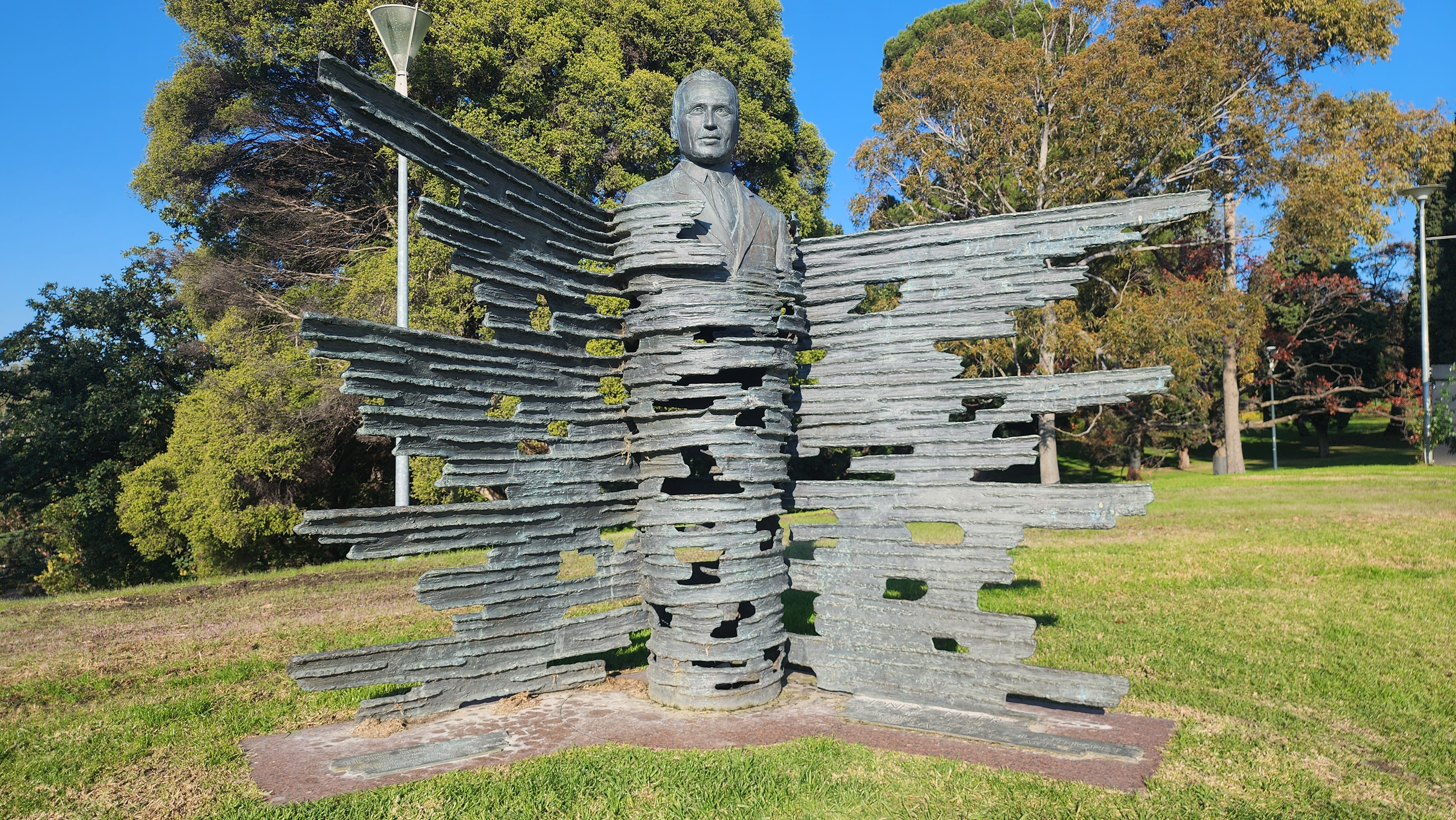
Sidney Myer's statue at Sidney Myer Music Bowl

A violinist who enjoyed music, Sidney Myer established free, open-air concerts with the Melbourne Symphony Orchestra in 1929, which were always well attended by Melburnians.

During the depression of the 1930s, Myer felt a responsibility to contribute something to the community that had assisted him in achieving business success and a personal fortune. Rather than terminate employment of workers in his Department Store, all staff, including himself, had their wages cut. Relief work was personally financed by a £22,000 sum, to provide employment opportunities. For the unemployed at Christmas, he financed a Christmas dinner for 10,000 people at the Royal Exhibition Building, including a gift for every child.

== Legacy ==
Myer's will was proved at £922,000. His funeral was attended by some 100,000 people. One-tenth of his estate went to establish the Sidney Myer Charitable Trust, now known as the Sidney Myer Fund, to continue the tradition of philanthropy begun by its founder. The most famous philanthropic funding was for the construction of the Sidney Myer Music Bowl in the Kings Domain, Melbourne in 1958, which is named in his honour. He is also the namesake for the Sidney Myer Asia Centre building at the University of Melbourne.
