= History of the Norwegian Police Service =

The Norwegian Police Service is the civilian police agency for Norway. The police service dates to the 13th century when sheriffs were first appointed. The first chief of police was appointed for Trondheim in 1686, and Oslo received a uniformed police corps in 1859. Police districts were introduced in 1894, with the current structure dating from 2003.

== History ==
The police force in Norway was established during the 13th century. Originally the 60 to 80 sheriffs (lensmann) were predominantly used for writ of execution and to a less degree police power. In the cities there were originally gjaldker who had police power. The sheriffs were originally subordinate to the sysselmann, but from the 14th century they instead became subordinate to the fogd (bailiff) and the number of sheriffs increased. In the cities the police authority was transferred directly to the fogd, known as byfogd. By the mid-17th century there were between 300 and 350 sheriffs. With the introduction of the absolute monarchy in 1660 and subsequent strengthening of the civil service, the importance of the police increased. The fogd as such became part of the police structure, with their subordinates, the county governors, received a similar role as that of chief of police. The first chief of police was hired in Trondheim in 1686, thus creating the first police district, although his jurisdiction only covered the city. Additional chiefs of police were hired in Bergen in 1692, Christiania (Oslo) in 1744 and Christianssand in 1776.

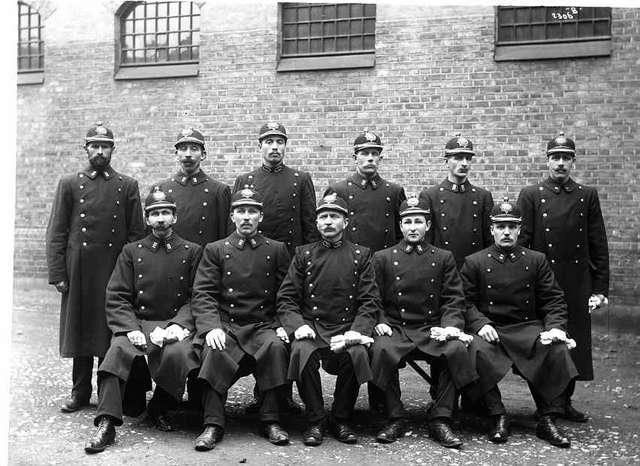
Norwegian police constables in 1908

From the 19th century deputies were hired in larger areas to assist the sheriffs. Neither the democratization in 1814 nor the introduction of municipal councils in 1837 effected the police structure. However, the Ministry of Justice and the Police were created in 1818 and have since had the primary responsibility of organizing the police force. The 19th century saw a large increase in the number of chiefs of police, increasing to sixteen by the middle of the century. Christiana established the country's first uniformed corps of constables from 1859, which gave the force a more unified appearance. Similar structures were soon introduced in many other cities. From 1859 the municipalities would finance the wages of the deputies and constables, which made it difficult for the police to use those forces outside the municipal borders. The first organized education of police officers started in Christiana in 1889.

The fogd position was decided abolished in 1894 and it was decided that some of its tasks would be transferred to the sheriffs. This resulted in 26 new chief of police positions, largely corresponding to the old fogderi areas (bailiwicks). Some received both cities and rural areas, other just rural areas. At the same time the existing police districts were expanded to include the surrounding rural areas. However, the individual fogd were not removed from office until their natural retirement, leaving some in place until 1919. This removed the difference between the rural and city police forces; however, the sheriffs were only subordinate to the chief of police in police matters—in civil matters and administration they remained under the county governors.

The police school was established in 1920 and the Governor of Svalbard was created in 1925. To increase the police force's flexibility, the municipal funding was cut and replaced with state funding in 1937. Also in 1937 the first two specialty agencies were created, the Police Surveillance Agency (later the Police Security Service) and the Mobile Police Service, while the former State Police was discontinued.

After a border agreement was reached between Norway and the Soviet Union in 1949, the Norwegian Border Commission was established the following year. The Criminal Investigation Service was established in 1959. The search and rescue system with two joint coordination centers and sub-centers for each police district was created in 1970.

The number of police districts was nearly constant from 1894 to 2002, although a few have been creased and closed. However, the organization in the various police districts varied considerably, especially in the cities. In particular some cities had the civilian responsibilities undertaken by the municipality. Especially for the public this was confusing, and the police services received a homogeneous organization during the 1980s, with the civil tasks being organized as part of the police stations. Økokrim was established in 1988 and in 1994 the administrative responsibilities for the sheriff's offices was transferred to police districts. The police school became a university college in 1993 and introduced a three-year education; in 1998 a second campus opened in Bodø. Police Reform 2000 was a major restructuring of the police force. First the National Police Directorate was created in 2001. From 2003 the number of police districts was reduced from 54 to 27. The Police Computing and Material Service and the Criminal Investigation Service were both established in 2004. Ten police officers have been killed in service since 1945.
