= Canadian Police Association =

Organization

CPA
- Canadian Police Association
- Headquarters: Ottawa, Ontario
- Location: Canada
- Members: 54,000
- Website: www.cpa-acp.ca

The Canadian Police Association (CPA) is an advocacy and fundraising organization that is also a registered lobbyist with the Canadian government. The CPA represents Canadian police officers. It is divided into 27 regional chapters at municipal, provincial, and federal levels. Each of these chapters is represented by either a president or director.

In 2003, the original "Canadian Police Association" was merged with the National Association of Professional Police, a coalition of American "police unions and associations" with a mandate to promote "the interests of America's law enforcement officers". The merger resulted in the formation of the Canadian Professional Police Association. At their annual convention in Victoria, British Columbia in August 2006, Canadian Professional Police Association members agreed to revert the name back to the Canadian Police Association because it was more recognizable and user friendly.

Their 60,000 members serve in 160 police services across Canada at the federal, provincial and municipal level.

== Membership ==
On their website, The Canadian Police Association say their "membership includes over 60,000 police personnel serving in 160 police services across Canada." There are 27 regional chapters at municipal, provincial, and federal levels.

They also have members from small towns to those working in large municipal and provincial police forces, as well as members of the RCMP, railway police, and first nations police personnel.

Provincial associations include British Columbia Police Association, Police Association of Ontario (PAO). At the municipal levels, Calgary Police Association and the Blood Tribe Police are also affiliated with the CPA.

Police unions, such as the Vancouver Police Union, which represents about "1,450 front-line police officers, jail guards and Special Constables of the Vancouver Police Department", for example, are "also affiliated with the British Columbia Police Association (BCPA) and the Canadian Police Association (CPA)."

== Mandate ==
According to their website, the CPA is "The national voice for Canadian police personnel." The role of the Canadian Police Association is to:

- lobby governments on police-related legislative and policy issues;
- provide a collective support network for Member Associations to successfully improve representation and conditions for their own members in collective bargaining, education and training, equipment, health and safety, and protecting members' rights;
- advocate for adequate and equitable resources for policing;
- identify key national issues which impact on Member Associations and facilitate the resolution of these issues;
- react and respond, upon request, to local policing issues that may have national ramifications; and
- liaise with the international policing bodies on issues affecting Canadian police personnel.

== History ==
According to the National Association of Professional Police (NAPO), "a coalition of police unions and associations from across the United States" which was established in 1978 it was "organized for the purpose of advancing the interests of America's law enforcement officers through legislative advocacy, political action and education."

In 1996, the Canadian Police Association invited international police association executives to a formal meeting in Windsor, Ontario where they established the International Council of Police Representative Associations (ICPRA). The ICPRA meets biannually to "bring national police unions together to discuss police union issues, to share information and to foster strong relationships between national associations." Participants included representatives from the Police Federation of England and Wales, Police Federation of Northern Ireland, Police Federation of England and Wales, the Scottish Police Federation, National Association of Police Organizations (NAPO) USA, and the Scottish Police Federation.

In 2003, the original "Canadian Police Association" was merged with the National Association of Professional Police to form the Canadian Professional Police Association.

At their annual convention in Victoria, British Columbia in August 2006, Canadian Professional Police Association members agreed to revert the name back to the Canadian Police Association because it was more recognizable and user friendly.

== Lobbying ==
Part of the mandate of the Canadian Police Association is to "lobby governments on police-related legislative and policy issues." The Canadian Police Association first registered as a lobbyist, with Tom Stamatakis as President on November 13, 2003. Since 2003, the CPA has lobbied Aboriginal Affairs and Northern Development Canada, Canada Labour Relations Board (CLRB), Canadian Pension Commission (CPC), Citizenship and Immigration Canada, Correctional Service of Canada (CSC), Finance Canada (FIN), Health Canada (HC), Human Resources Development Canada (HRDC), Immigration and Refugee Board (IRB), Justice Canada (JC), National Research Council (NRC), Public Service Staff Relations Board (PSSRB), Public Works and Government Services Canada, Revenue Canada (RC), Royal Canadian Mounted Police (RCMP), Solicitor General Canada (SGC), Statistics Canada, Transportation Safety Board of Canada (TSB), and the Treasury Board Of Canada Secretariat (TBS).

== Administration ==
Tom Stamatakis has served as a CPA board member since 2003. He was President in 2003, then Vice-President in 2005. Tony Cannavino was President for a term beginning in 2005. Stamatakis has been serving a second term as President since September 2014." The Director of the Canadian Police Association is Tom Stamatakis, who was President of the Vancouver Police Union. Stamatkis is also Chair of the International Council of Police Representative Associations (ICPRA).

== Police Officers' Bill of Rights ==
The Canadian Police Association is promoting an initiative for police officers' rights. The association argues that the nature of police work requires members of police services to accept risks in order to preserve public safety, and that police officers are often called upon to intervene in situations when the safety of others as well as their own may be at risk. The Canadian Police Association states that police officers accept this risk, with the expectation that they will be properly supported by their employers, lawmakers and the justice system when they are the subject of malicious attacks, including malicious allegations with respect to conduct.

In Canada the statutory authority regarding policing is governed by federal law, provincial law and often municipal by-laws. The laws, policies and practices concerning the support and treatment afforded to police officers often vary by jurisdiction.

The Canadian Police Association is therefore promoting a "Police Officers' Bill of Rights". The association seeks to have this Bill of Rights adopted by federal, provincial and municipal governments, as a basic and consistent set of principles governing the standards applied to their members.

== Professional fundraisers advisories ==
According to a public advisory by the Calgary Police Foundation (CPF) the CPA had a contract with Front Line Support Inc, a professional for-profit fundraising telemarketer with headquarters in Toronto, Ontario and Rio Rancho, New Mexico. The Calgary Police Foundation sought to clarify that the CPF was not involved in a Canadian Police Association (CPA) fundraising campaign "to allow underprivileged families to attend a CPA-hosted Stampede Family Fun Day."

The Vernon-North Okanagan RCMP spokesperson said, "It appears the [contracted] telemarketers on some occasions, have implied the RCMP is involved in the campaign, which we are not." Their "national anti-bullying educational program" is legitimate, but these claims are not.

== Police associations in Canadian context ==
In his 2000 book entitled Police: Current Issues in Canadian Law Enforcement, sociologist Dennis Forcese described "the role and militancy of police unions."

== Police lobby groups ==
In 2016, a BC Human Rights Tribunal observed that the "noted that lobby groups like The Canadian Association of Chiefs of Police do almost nothing but advocate for law reform, and theirs cannot be the only legitimate voice." Canadian Association of Chiefs of Police, "is often taken as the de facto 'voice of Canadian policing'. In 2016, they lobbied for "legislation that would give police the ability to get a warrant to 'compel the holder of an encryption key or password to reveal it to law enforcement' to unlock electronic devices.

== See also ==
- Canadian Association of Chiefs of Police
- Law enforcement in Canada
