= National Police Computing and Material Service (Norway) =

National Police Computing and Material Service (Norwegian: Politiets data- og materielltjeneste, PMDT) is an agency of the Norwegian Police Service which has the responsibility for information and communications technology, procurement, security and real estate. Subordinate to the National Police Directorate, it was established in 2004.

== Equipment ==
As of 2011 the police's new patrol cars are four-wheel drive Volkswagen Passat with automatic transmission. New transport cars are Mercedes-Benz Vito for light transport and Mercedes-Benz Sprinter for heavy transport. The police force operates two Eurocopter EC135 helicopters, which are based at Oslo Airport, Gardermoen. In addition, the Emergency Response Unit can use the Royal Norwegian Air Force's Bell 412 helicopters.

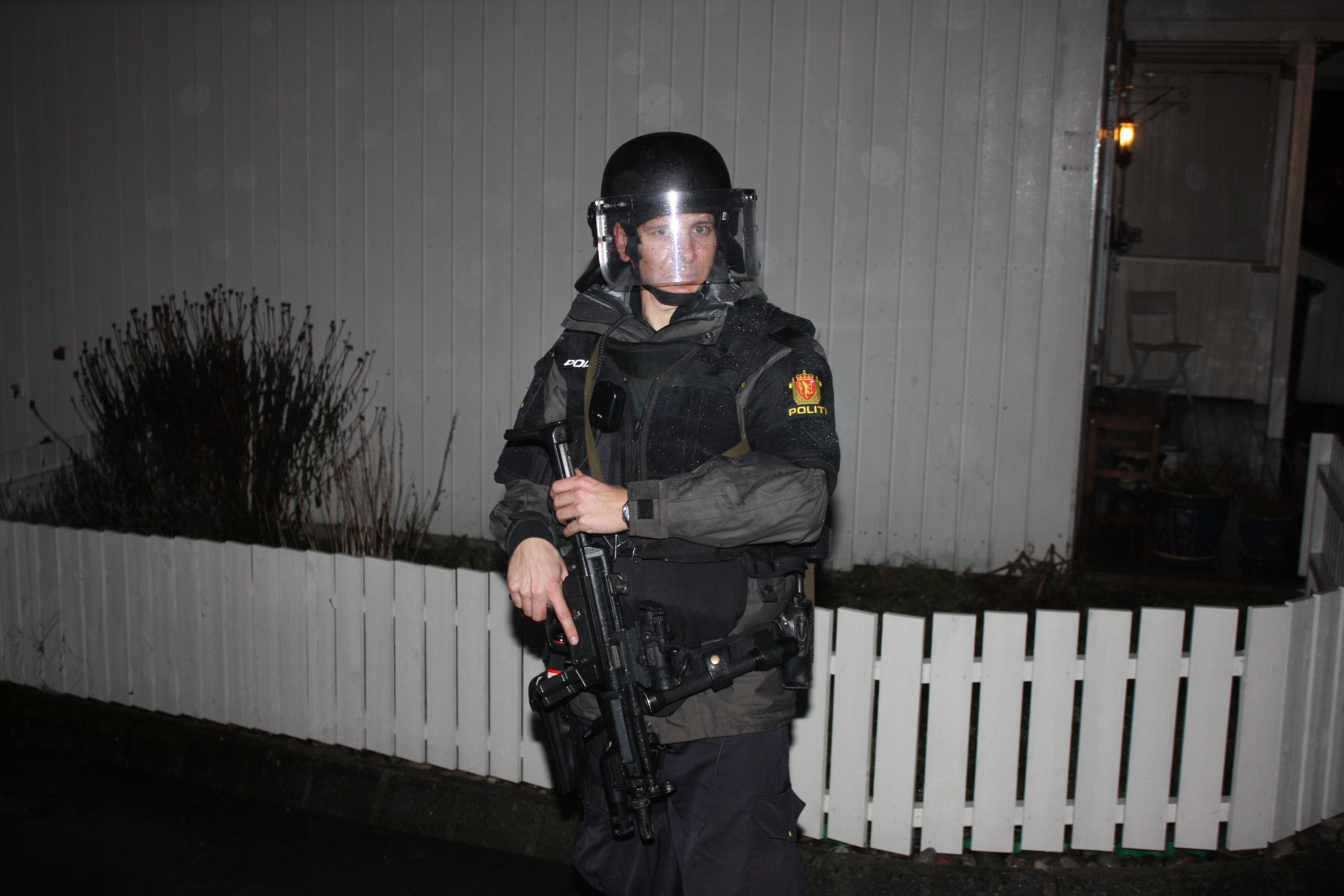
Police officer armed with a Heckler & Koch MP5

The police have two main types of uniforms, type I is used for personnel which primarily undertake indoor work, and type II is used for personnel which primarily undertakes outdoor service. Both types have summer and winter versions, and type I also has a dress uniform version. Both types use black as the dominant color with light blue shirts. Police officers are not armed with firearms during patrolling, but have weapons locked down in the patrol cars. Arming requires permission from the chief of police or someone designated by him. The police use Heckler & Koch MP5 submachine guns and Heckler & Koch P30 semi-automatic pistols. Specially-trained forces use Diemaco C8 assault rifles. Norwegian police officers do not use electroshock weapons.

Previously the police used a decentralized information technology system developed during the mid-1990s. As late as 2012 servers were still being run with Windows NT 4.0 from 1996 and log-on times were typically twenty minutes. The new IT-system D#2 was introduced in 2011 and will have been taken into use by all divisions by 2012. D#2 will be operated by ErgoGroup and will have two redundant server centers. Personnel have access to the system via thin clients. The police have a system to raise a national alarm to close border crossings and call in reserve personnel. The one time it was activated the message was not received by any of the indented recipients. Since 2009 it has been possible to report criminal damage and theft of wallets, bicycles and mobile telephones without known perpetrator online.

The Norwegian Public Safety Radio has been installed in Oslo, Østfold, Akershus and southern Buskerud. The system is uses Terrestrial Trunked Radio and allows for a common public safety network for all emergency agencies. Features include authentication, encryption and possibilities to transmit data traffic. As the system is rolled out, central parts will receive transmission speeds of 163 kbit/s. The rest of the country uses an analog radio system specific for each police district. In addition to lack of interoperability with paramedics and fire fighters, none of the systems are encrypted, forcing police officers to rely heavily on GSM-based mobile telephones for dispatch communication when transmitting sensitive information. Police cars lack GPS navigation devices and mobile data terminal. Instead, all communication must be radioed to the dispatcher at the joint operations center, and officers must rely on printed road atlases for navigation. In contrast, navigation and terminal equipment was finished installed in ambulances and fire trucks in 2003. The Norwegian Public Safety Radio is scheduled for completion in 2015.
