= Norwegian Police Service =

Law enforcement agency

Norwegian Police Service Politi- og lensmannsetaten
- Coat of arms
- Common name: Politi

Agency overview
- Formed: 1937
- Employees: 13,000
- Annual budget: 13 billion kr (2010)

Jurisdictional structure
- National agency: Norway
- Operations jurisdiction: Norway
- General nature: Local civilian police

Operational structure
- Minister responsible: Astri Aas-Hansen, Minister of Justice and Public Security
- Agency executive: Marie Benedicte Bjørnland, National Police Commissioner
- Parent agency: Ministry of Justice and Public Security
- National units: List: National Criminal Investigation Service; National Authority for Investigation and Prosecution of Economic and Environmental Crime in Norway; National Police Immigration Service; National Mobile Police Service; Norwegian Border Commissioner; National Police Computing and Material Service; Norwegian Police University College
- Police districts: 12

Facilities
- Stations: 66
- Sheriff's offices: 301
- Helicopters: 3 AgustaWestland AW169

Website
- politi.no

The Norwegian Police Service (Norwegian: Politi- og lensmannsetaten) is the Norwegian national civilian police agency. The service dates to the 13th century when the first sheriffs were appointed, with the current structure established in 2003. It comprises a central National Police Directorate, seven specialty agencies and twelve police districts. The government agency is subordinate to the Ministry of Justice and Public Security and has 16,000 employees, of which 8,000 are police officers. In addition to police powers, the service is responsible for border control, certain civil duties, coordinating search and rescue operations, counterterrorism, highway patrolling, writ of execution, criminal investigation and prosecution. The directorate is led by the National Police Commissioner.

Each police district is led by a chief of police and is subdivided into several police stations in towns and cities, and sheriffs' offices for rural areas. The Governor of Svalbard acts as chief of police for Svalbard. As of July 1, 2025, Norwegian police officers are generally armed while on duty, following a parliamentary decision in June 2025 to amend the Police Act. Prior to this, officers typically did not carry firearms, but kept weapons secured in patrol vehicles. The Norwegian Prosecuting Authority is partially integrated with the police.

Specialist agencies within the services include the National Criminal Investigation Service, the National Authority for Investigation and Prosecution of Economic and Environmental Crime (Økokrim), the National Police Immigration Service, the National Mobile Police Service, the Norwegian Border Commissioner, the National Police Computing and Material Service and the Norwegian Police University College. Several other national responsibilities are under the command of Oslo Police District, such as the police tactical unit Delta and the two police helicopters. The Police Security Service is separate from the National Police Directorate.

== History ==
The police force in Norway was established during the 13th century. Originally the 60 to 80 sheriffs (lensmann) were predominantly used for writ of execution and to a less degree police power. In the cities the duties were originally taken care of by a gjaldker. The sheriffs were originally subordinate to the sysselmann, but from the 14th century they instead became subordinate to the bailiff (fogd) and the number of sheriffs increased. In the cities the police authority was transferred directly to the bailiff. By the mid-17th century there were between 300 and 350 sheriffs. With the introduction of the absolute monarchy in 1660 and subsequent strengthening of the civil service, the importance of the police increased. The bailiffs as such became part of the police structure, with their superiors, the county governor, receiving a similar role as that of chief of police. The first titled chief of police was hired in Trondheim in 1686, thus creating the first police district, although his jurisdiction only covered the city proper. Chiefs of police were hired in Bergen in 1692, Christiania (Oslo) in 1744 and Christianssand in 1776.

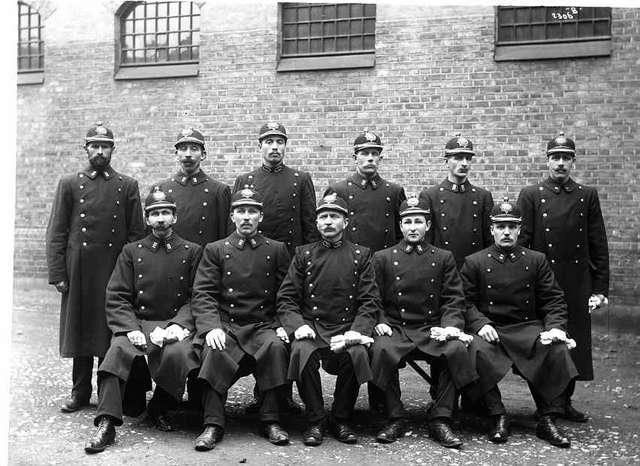
Norwegian police constables in 1908

From the 19th century, deputies were hired in larger areas to assist the sheriffs. Following the democratization in 1814, the Ministry of Justice was created in 1818 and has since had the primary responsibility for organizing the police force. The 19th century saw a large increase in the number of chiefs of police, reaching sixteen by the middle of the century. Christiania established the country's first uniformed corps of constables in 1859, which gave the force a more unified appearance. Similar structures were soon introduced in many other cities. From 1859 the municipalities would finance the wages of the deputies and constables, which made it difficult for the police to use those forces outside the municipal borders. The first organized education of police officers started in Christiania in 1889.

In 1894 the authorities decided to abolish the position of bailiff and it was decided that some of its tasks would be transferred to the sheriffs. This resulted in 26 new chief of police positions, largely corresponding to the old bailiwicks. Some received jurisdiction over both cities and rural areas, other just rural areas. At the same time the existing police districts were expanded to include the surrounding rural areas. However, the individual bailiff were not removed from office until their natural retirement, leaving some bailiwick in place until 1919. The reform eliminated the difference between the rural and city police forces; yet the sheriffs were only subordinate to the chief of police in police matters—in civil matters and administration they remained under the county governors.

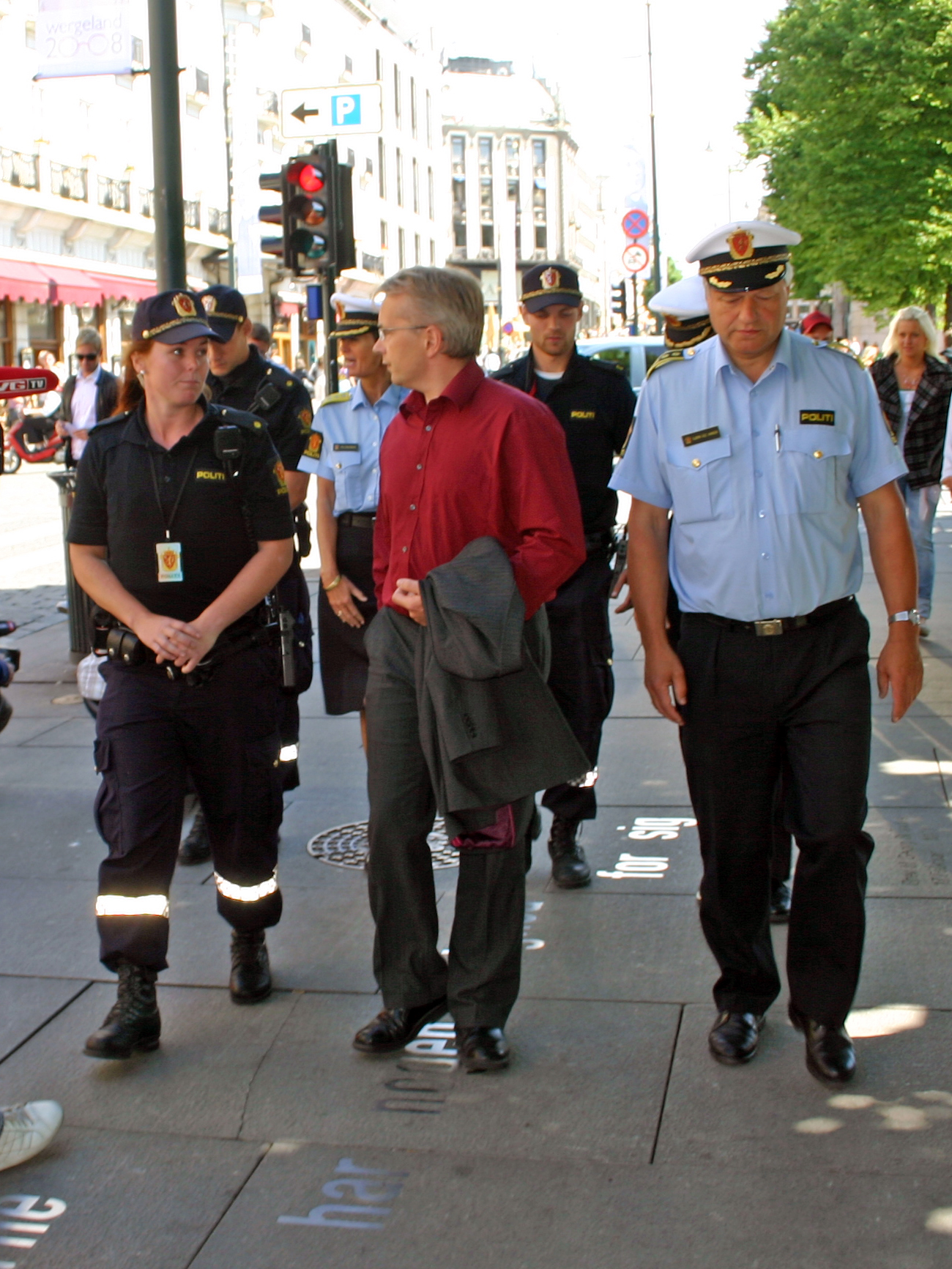
Police students (left), Minister of Justice and the Police Knut Storberget (middle) and Oslo Chief of Police Anstein Gjengedal (right) in 2008

The police school was established in 1920 and the Governor of Svalbard was created in 1925. To increase the police force's flexibility, the municipal funding was cut and replaced with state funding in 1937. That year also saw the first two specialty agencies were created, the Police Surveillance Agency (later the Police Security Service) and the Mobile Police Service. After a border agreement was reached between Norway and the Soviet Union in 1949, the Norwegian Border Commission was established the following year. The Criminal Investigation Service was established in 1959, and the search and rescue system with two joint coordination centers and sub-centers for each police district was created in 1970.

The number of police districts was nearly constant from 1894 to 2002, although a few have been creased and closed. However, the organization in the various police districts varied considerably, especially in the cities. In particular, some cities had their civilian responsibilities taken care of by the municipality. This was confusing for the public, resulting in the police services reorganizing to a homogeneous organization during the 1980s, whereby the civil tasks being organized as part of the police stations. Økokrim was established in 1988 and in 1994 the administrative responsibilities for the sheriff's offices was transferred to police districts. Only once has the order to shoot to kill been issued, during the Torp hostage crisis in 1994. The police school became a university college in 1993 and introduced a three-year education; in 1998 a second campus opened in Bodø. Police Reform 2000 was a major restructuring of the police force. First the National Police Directorate was created in 2001, and from 2003 the number of police districts were reduced from 54 to 27. The Police Computing and Material Service and the Criminal Investigation Service were both established in 2004. Ten police officers have been killed in service since 1945. The Gjørv Report following the 2011 Norway attacks criticized several aspects of the police force, labeling the work as "unacceptable". National Commissioner Øystein Mæland withdrew following the criticism, in part because an internal report of the attacks had not found any criticism of the police force.

=== Arming ===
On 12 June 2025, a majority in the Storting (Norwegian parliament) voted to introduce general arming of the Norwegian police. The decision was based on a government proposal to amend the Police Act, allowing officers to carry firearms during routine duties. The Norwegian Police Directorate was given the authority to determine whether – and to what extent – the police should be armed. The policy of routine arming officially came into effect on 1 July 2025.

Previously, Norwegian police officers were typically unarmed during daily service, although firearms have been stored in patrol vehicles. The Ministry of Justice and Public Security is drafting a proposal for permanent rules on general arming. The police have advocated for such a system for several years, arguing that it will improve preparedness for serious and unforeseen incidents.

== Structure ==
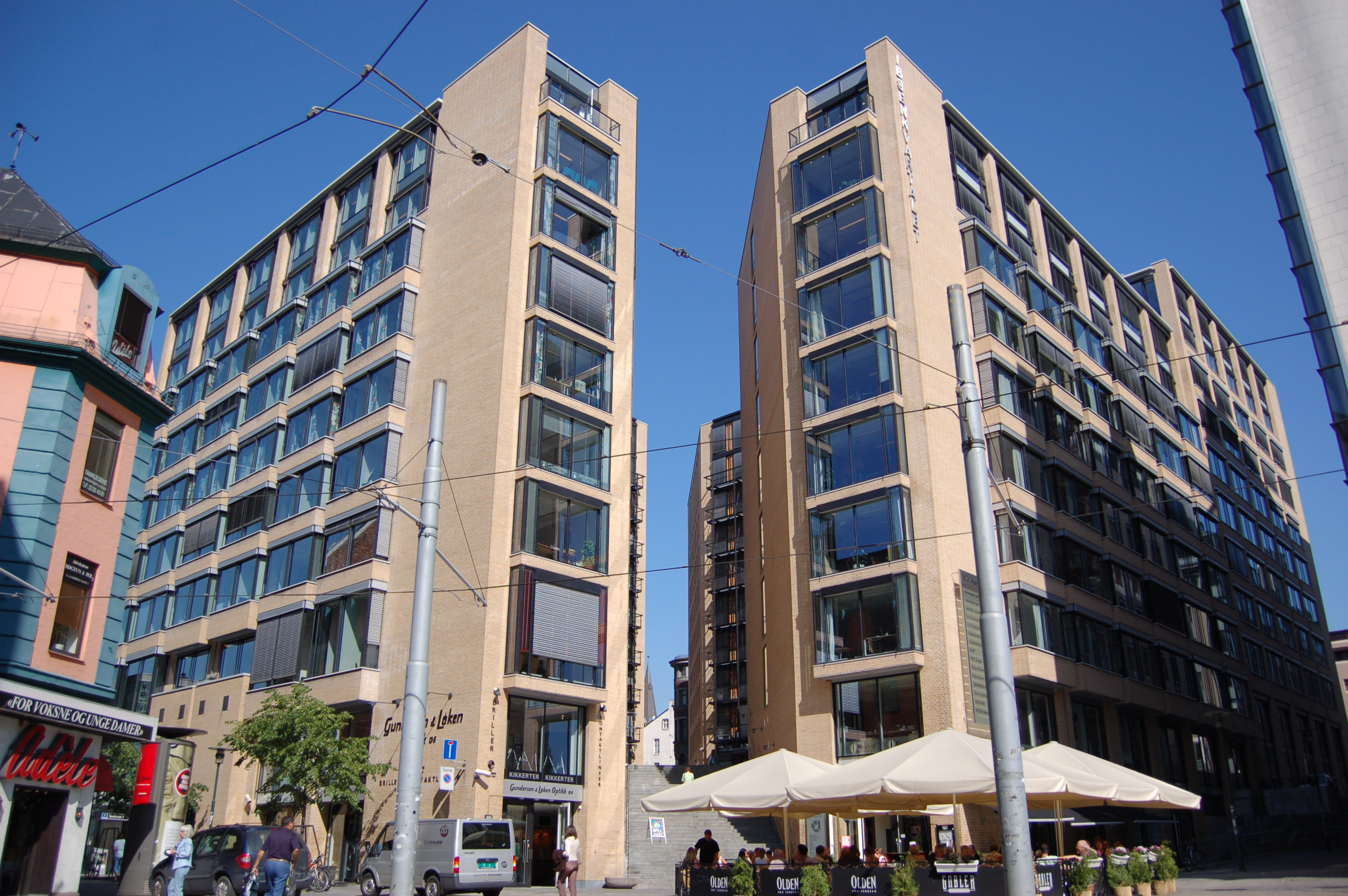
Head offices of the National Authority for Investigation and Prosecution of Economic and Environmental Crime in Norway in Oslo

The National Police Directorate, located in Downtown Oslo, is the central administration for the Norwegian Police Service. It conducts management and supervision of the specialist agencies and police districts, including organizational development and support activities. The directorate is led by the National Police Commissioner, who, since 2012, has been Odd Reidar Humlegård. The National Criminal Investigation Service is a national unit which works with organized and serious crime. It both works as an assistant unit for police districts, with special focus on technical and tactical investigation, in addition to being responsible on its own for organized crime. It acts as the center for international police cooperation, including participation in Interpol and Europol. The National Authority for Investigation and Prosecution of Economic and Environmental Crime is responsible for complex cases of economic crime and acts as a public prosecutor for those cases. The National Police Immigration Service registers and identifies asylum seekers and returns those which have their applications rejected. The National Mobile Police Service is based in Stavern and operates throughout the country. Their primary role is as highway patrol and manages the police reserves, although they also assist police districts in extraordinary events where extra manpower is needed or where they are in the vicinity.

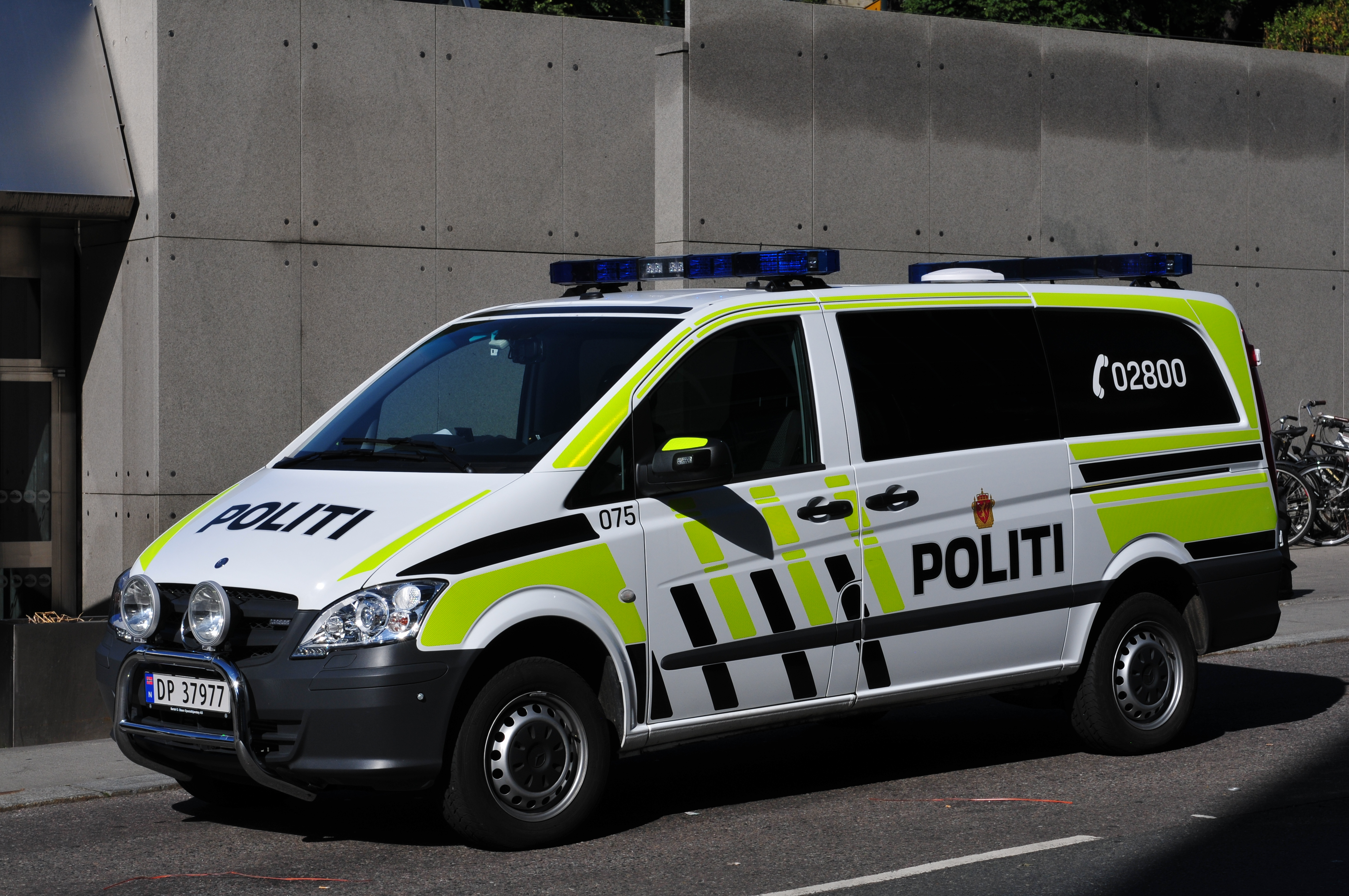
Mercedes-Benz Vito police transport van

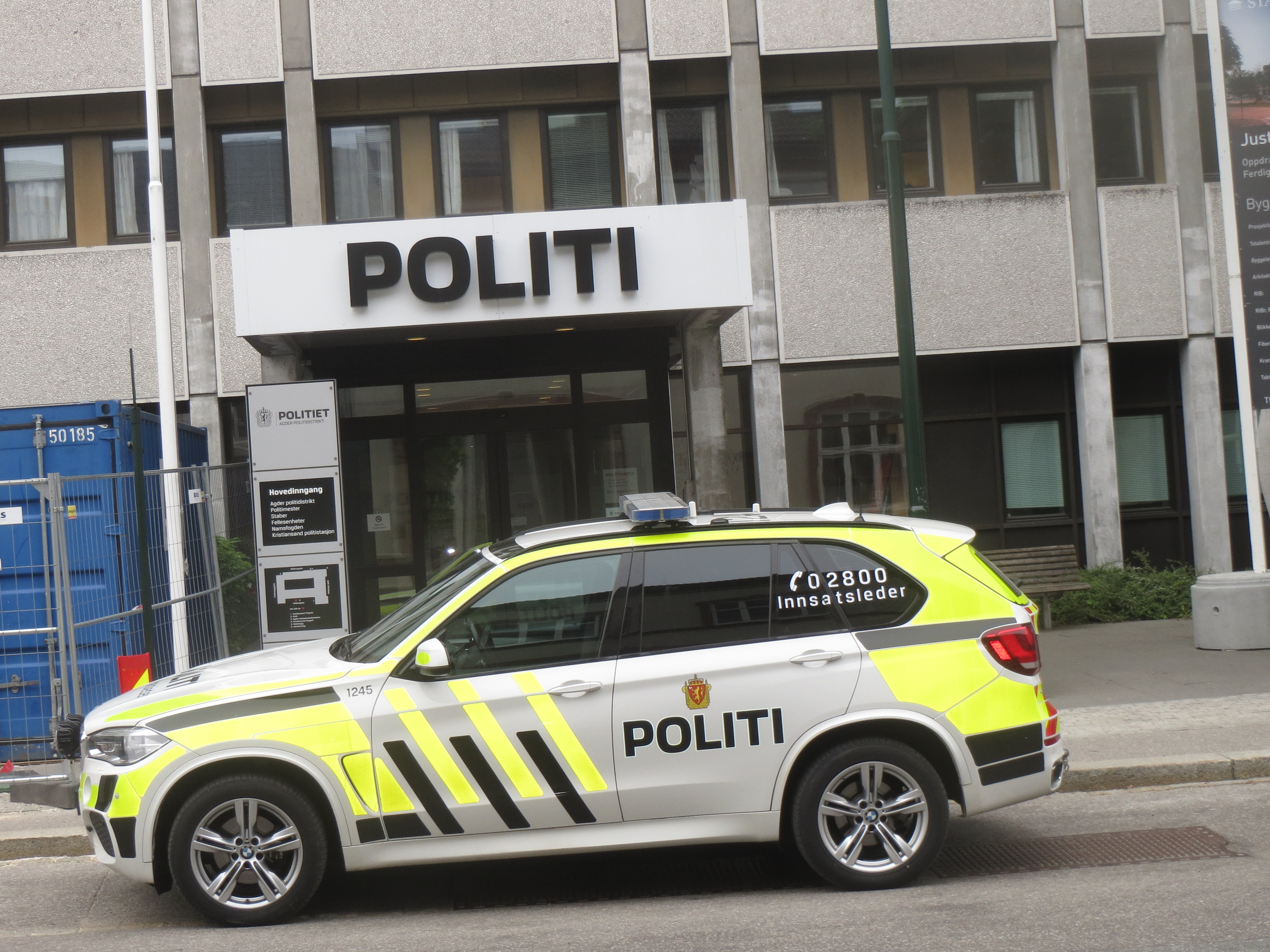
BMW X5 command vehicle

The Norwegian Border Commissioner is located in Kirkenes and is responsible for managing the Norway–Russia border and upholding the border agreement. Special consideration is needed as it is the only non-Schengen Area land border of Norway. Border controls are the responsibility of the respective police district. The National Police Computing and Material Service is responsible for managing the police's information and communications technology, procurement, security and real estate. Norway has two joint rescue coordination centers, one for Northern Norway located in Bodø and on one for Southern Norway located in Sola. Their jurisdiction border goes at the 65th parallel north (Nord-Trøndelag–Nordland border). Organizationally they are directly subordinate to the Ministry of Justice and the Police, although their operations are subordinate to the chiefs of police in Salten and Rogaland, respectively. The Police Security Service is Norway's security agency; although considered a law enforcement agency, it is not subordinate to the National Police Directorate nor part of the Norwegian Police Service.

Metropolitan Norway is divided into 27 police districts. Each district is further subdivided into local police stations and rural police districts, the latter led by a sheriff. Each police district is headquartered at a main police station and is led by a chief of police. Police districts hold a common pool of resources and personnel and have a common administration and budget. Each also has a joint operations center which also acts as an emergency call center for 112. Many of the larger districts have their own execution and enforcement authority, while this in integrated in the smaller districts. The size of the police districts varies, from Oslo with 2,500 employees and covering a population of 570,000 to Eastern Finnmark which has 160 employees and 30,000 residents.

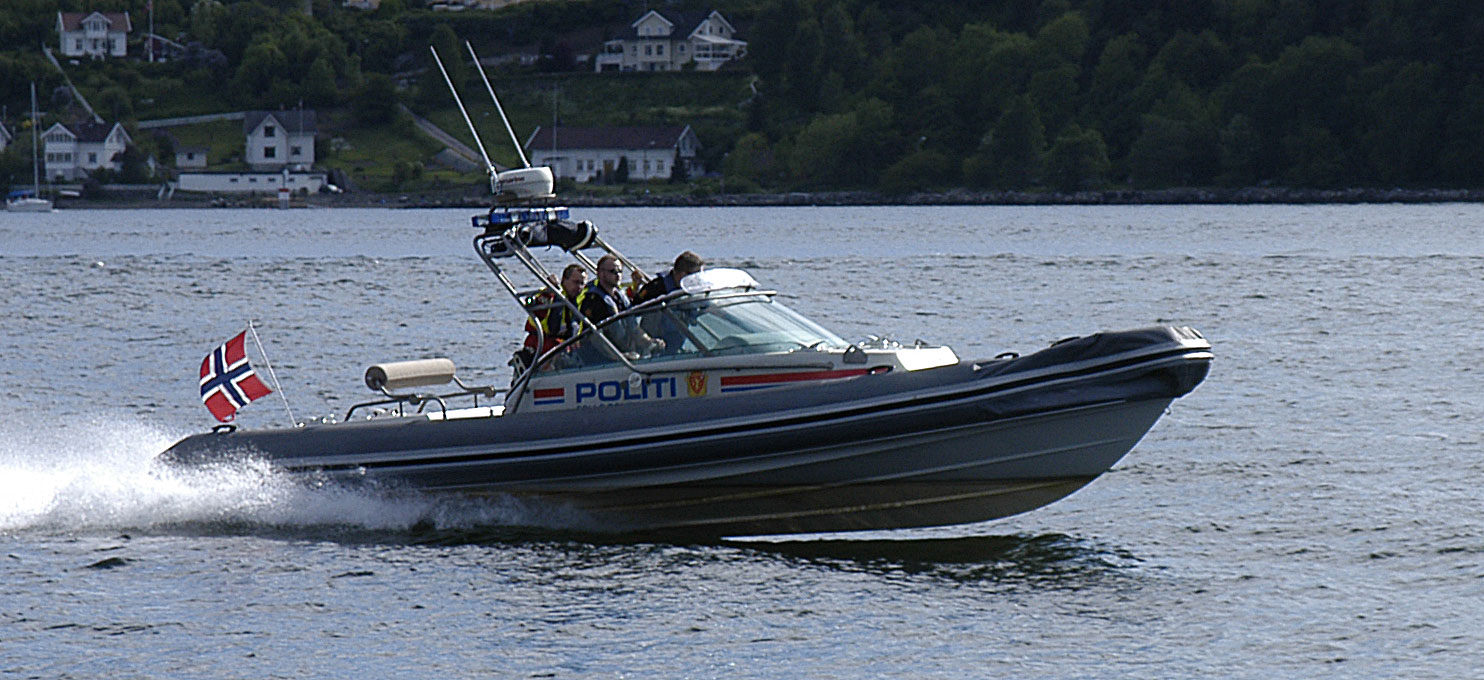
Water police mission near Drøbak in the Oslofjord

Each districts has specially-trained mobile units for armed and other challenging missions, and dog units for narcotics and search and rescue missions. The police districts also have police boats for coastal waters and selected lakes, with focus on driving under the influence, speeding and environmental monitoring. In Troms and Finnmark, the Reindeer Police are responsible for monitoring and supervising reindeer husbandry and environmental supervision. As of 2009 there were 301 rural police districts, 68 local police stations and 10 execution and enforcement authorities.

Oslo Police District has a series of special divisions and task forces which provide aid to all other police districts when necessary. It is responsible for the two police helicopters, which is mostly used for traffic motoring, search and rescue and apprehension. The tactical unit Delta is for terrorism, sabotage and hostage incidents, which is separate from the crisis and hostage negotiation service. Oslo's dog patrol service includes the national bomb squad. The departments further has a mobile deployment squad against demonstrations and riots, a Police Negotiation Unit for use against barricades and kidnapping, a mounted police, and the responsibility for protecting high-ranking government and royal officials.

Svalbard is not part of the regular police districts—instead its law enforcement is handled by the Governor of Svalbard, who holds the responsibility as both county governor and chief of police, as well as other authority granted by the executive branch. Duties include environmental policy, family law, law enforcement, search and rescue, tourism management, information services, contact with foreign settlements, and adjudication in some areas of maritime inquiries and judicial examinations—albeit never in the same cases as acting as police. Jan Mayen is subordinate to Salten Police District.

== Jurisdiction and capabilities ==
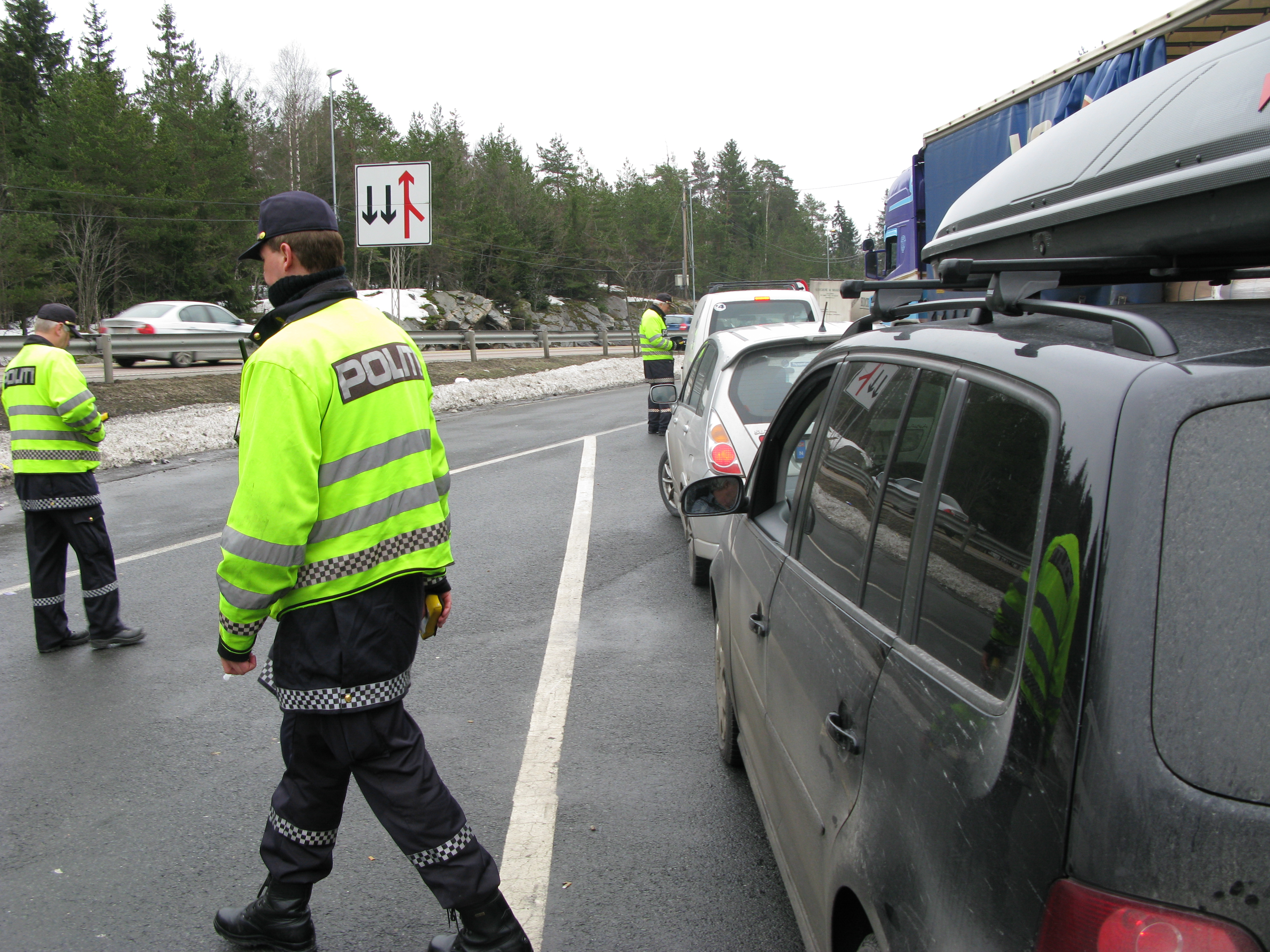
The National Mobile Police Service performing a traffic control on E18

Norway has a unified police, which means that there is a single police organization and that police power and prosecutor power is not granted to other agencies within Norway. The sole exception is the military police, albeit which only has jurisdiction over military personnel and on military installations, except during martial law. The police are decentralized and generalized to allow a more flexible resource allocation, while remaining under political control. This entails that police officers have no geographical or sector limitations to their powers. The Police Act and several special laws regulate the agencies and the officer's powers and responsibilities. The police are required to assist other public institutions, including the healthcare authorities, and can be asked by other agencies to assist when it is necessary to enact a decision by force. Conversely, the police can ask for assistance from the Coast Guard when necessary. The police are responsible for all responses against terrorism and sabotage unless Norway is under armed attack.

Responsibilities and functions related to security includes patrolling, continual emergency availability, highway patrolling, sea patrolling, coordination of search and rescue activities, embassy security and as a body guard service for members of the government, the royal family and other in need. The crime fighting responsibility is split between preventative measures, such as information, observation and controls, and consequential measures, such as investigation and prosecution. The police further have duties related to civilian court cases, such as writ of execution, evaluation of natural damage, assisting the courts after bankruptcies and functioning as a notary public.

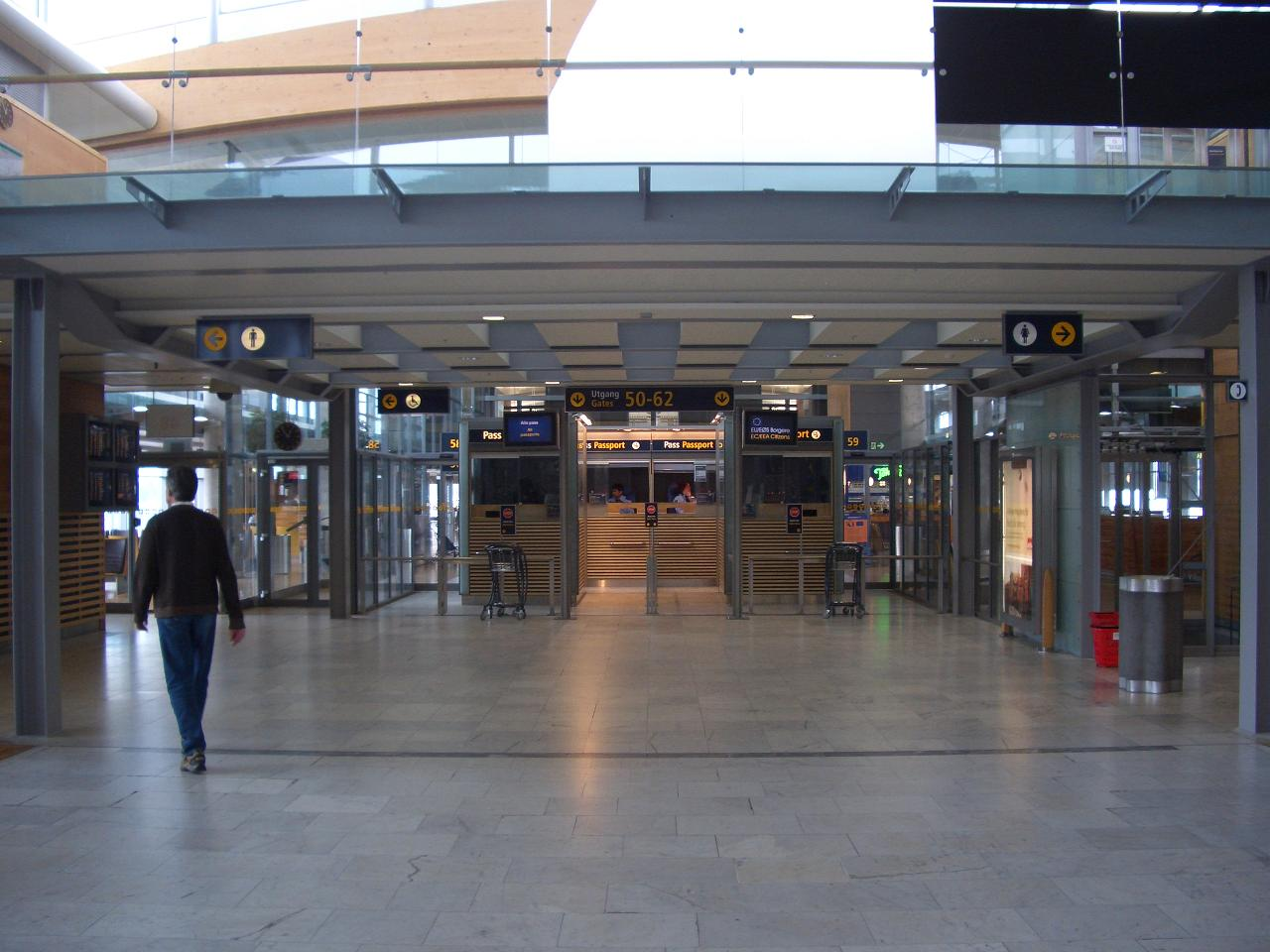
Romerike Police District is responsible for the passport control at Oslo Airport, Gardermoen

The police have a series of functions related to public management, such as the issuing of passports and national identity cards, firearms licenses, police certificates, permissions for lotteries and withdrawal of driving licenses, approval of security guard companies and bouncers, recommendations to municipal councils for issuing alcohol sales licenses, approval of second-hand shops and arrangements which are otherwise unlawful, dealing with unowned dogs and animals in the care of people sentenced unsuitable to hold animals.

The police also have the responsibility for prisoner transport during detention, including transport to and from court. The police serve as border guards for the outer border of the Schengen Area. The busiest are Oslo Airport, Gardermoen, which has 130 person-years tied to it, Storskog on the Russian border and Sandefjord Airport, Torp. These are the only borders with designated border employees—all other are staffed with regular officers. The police is not responsible for customs, which is the responsibility of the Norwegian Customs and Excise Authorities. Norway participates in a series of international police cooperation, such as Interpol, Europol, the Schengen Information System, Frontex, and the Baltic Sea Task Force on Organized Crime. Norway also has a close cooperation with the other Nordic police forces. The Norwegian Police Service occasionally participates in international operations.

In 2011 the police force had 746,464 assignments, the most common with 180,000 assignments being investigation cases, such as reported deaths, controls and reports of motor vehicle theft. This was followed by traffic assignments, public disturbance of peace, animal cases, theft, private disturbance of peace, and sickness and psychiatry. Seventy-five percent of assignments are solved with a single patrol, while ninety percent are solved with one and two. In armed situations only twenty percent are solved with a single patrol. In 2010 the Norwegian Police Service had 13 billion Norwegian krone in costs, of which seventy percent was used on wages. It employed 13,493 person-years, or 1.6 person-years per 1000 residents. There were 394,137 reported offenses, or 81.1 per 1000 people, of which 46 percent were solved. There were 5,399 debt settlements, 226,491 applications for writ of execution, 195,345 immigration cases and 4,615 forced returns.

== Investigation and prosecution ==
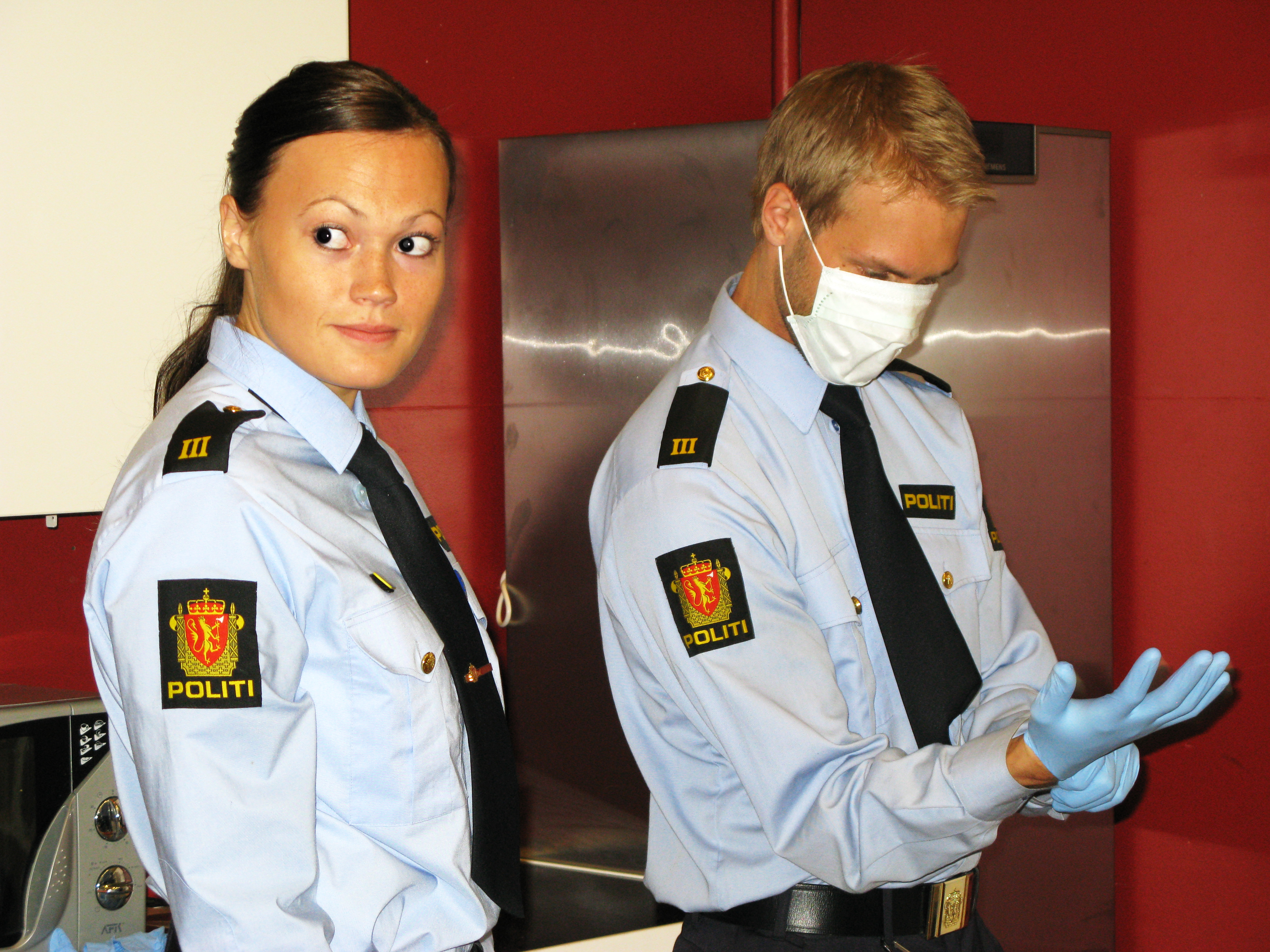
A police student demonstrates securing DNA evidence.

The Norwegian Prosecuting Authority is integrated into the Norwegian Police Service. The authority is divided into a higher and lower authority, with the higher authority (public prosecutor) being a separate government agency and the lower authority (police prosecutor) being members of the police. The latter includes chief of police, deputy chief of police, police prosecutors and deputy police prosecutors. In questions of prosecution the police districts are subordinate to the Norwegian Prosecuting Authority and in other matters subordinate to the National Police Directorate.

The higher authorities will take decisions in serious criminal charges and for appeals. The Norwegian Persecuting Authority is led by the Director General of Public Prosecutions, which since 1997 has been Tor-Aksel Busch. The director general makes decisions of indictment in cases with a maximum penalty of twenty-one years and certain other serious crimes. There are twelve subordinate agencies, ten regional and two supporting Kripos and Økokrim, respectively. The regional public prosecution offices take decisions regarding cases not covered by the director general or the police prosecutors.

If an offense is filed, the issue may be investigated by police on duty. Permission for search and seizure is issued by the police prosecutor on duty at the police district. Apprehended people are permitted a free defense counsel at the public's expense. If the police wish to keep apprehended people in detention, the issue is brought to the relevant district court, a process which may be repeated several times if the custody needs to be extended. Investigations are led by a police prosecutor. During investigation, the case may be concluded as a non-criminal offense, dismissed, or transferred to another police district. Minor cases with a positive finding may be resolved by police penalty notice, settlement by a conflict resolution board and withdrawal of prosecution.

Criminal cases with an assumed perpetrator are sent to the public prosecutor, who will consider issuing an indictment. If positive, the trial will take place at a district court, with a police prosecutor presiding over the case. Cases with more than six years maximum penalty will normally be carried out with public prosecutors prosecuting. Either party can, on specified terms, appeal the outcome of the case to the court of appeal and ultimately the Supreme Court of Norway.

== Education and employment ==
Education of police officers is the responsibility of the Norwegian Police University College, which is subordinate to the National Police Directorate. The main campus is located at Majorstuen in Oslo, while the secondary campus is located at Mørkved in Bodø. In addition the college has training centers in Kongsvinger and Stavern. Police officer training is a three-year bachelor's degree, where the first and third year take place at the college and the second year is on-the-ground training in police districts.

In 2009, 1990 people applied for 432 places at the college. From 2010, admission is administrated through the Norwegian Universities and Colleges Admission Service. The college also has a three-year part-time master's degree in police science. As the chief of police and deputy chief of police are part of the prosecuting authority, they must be a candidate of law to act in such a position. Although there no longer is a formal requirement for such an education, the role as prosecutor effectively hinders others from holding the position.

At the time of graduation all officers are qualified for operational service. However, each employee must undergo 40 hours of yearly training, including firearms practice, to keep their operational certification. Without this, they cannot patrol, use firearms or participate in actions. Forty-four percent of police officers in 2012 lacked such certification. The main reason is that the police districts see it as a waste of resources to train investigation and administrative staff which do not participate in operative duty, and that a higher quality is achieved through specialization of tasks, such as dedicated investigation personnel.

Each police district may dictate that operational personnel have a higher amount of training, for instance 80 hours is required in Oslo. Officers are certified at five levels, of which the top four can use firearms. Level three consists of a call-out unit for each police district, consisting of a combined 646 people. This requires 103 hours of special training per year. Higher levels are required for body-guard service (55 officers) and the tactical unit Delta (73 officers). All certification curriculum is developed by and organized by the university college.

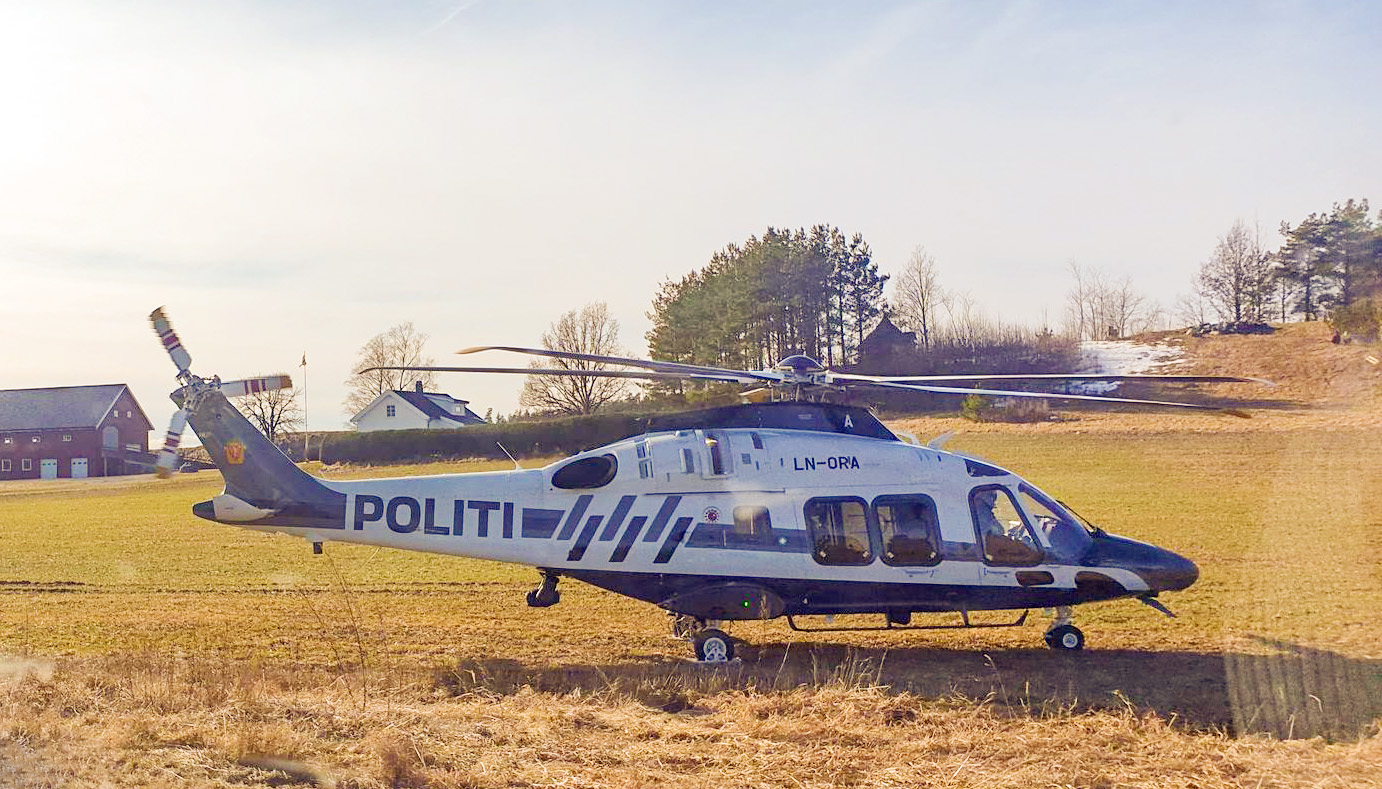
AW169 operated by the Norwegian Police Service.

The Norwegian Police Federation is the trade union which organizes employees from all levels within the police force. The federation is a member of the Confederation of Unions for Professionals, Norway and the European Confederation of Police. It is illegal for police officers to strike. The federation have nonetheless undertaken several actions, including collective sick leave to close a police station and by members sabotaging courses by not participating. Reports of misconduct and criminal offenses by officers during duty is investigated by the Norwegian Bureau for the Investigation of Police Affairs. Based in Hamar, it is directly subordinate to the Ministry of Justice and the Police and is not part of the Norwegian Police Service.

== Equipment ==
As of 2023 the police's new patrol cars are four-wheel drive Volvo V90CC with automatic transmission. New transport cars are Mercedes-Benz Vito for light transport and Mercedes-Benz Sprinter for heavy transport. The police force operates three AW169 helicopters, which are based at Oslo Airport, Gardermoen. In addition, Delta can use the Royal Norwegian Air Force's Bell 412 helicopters.

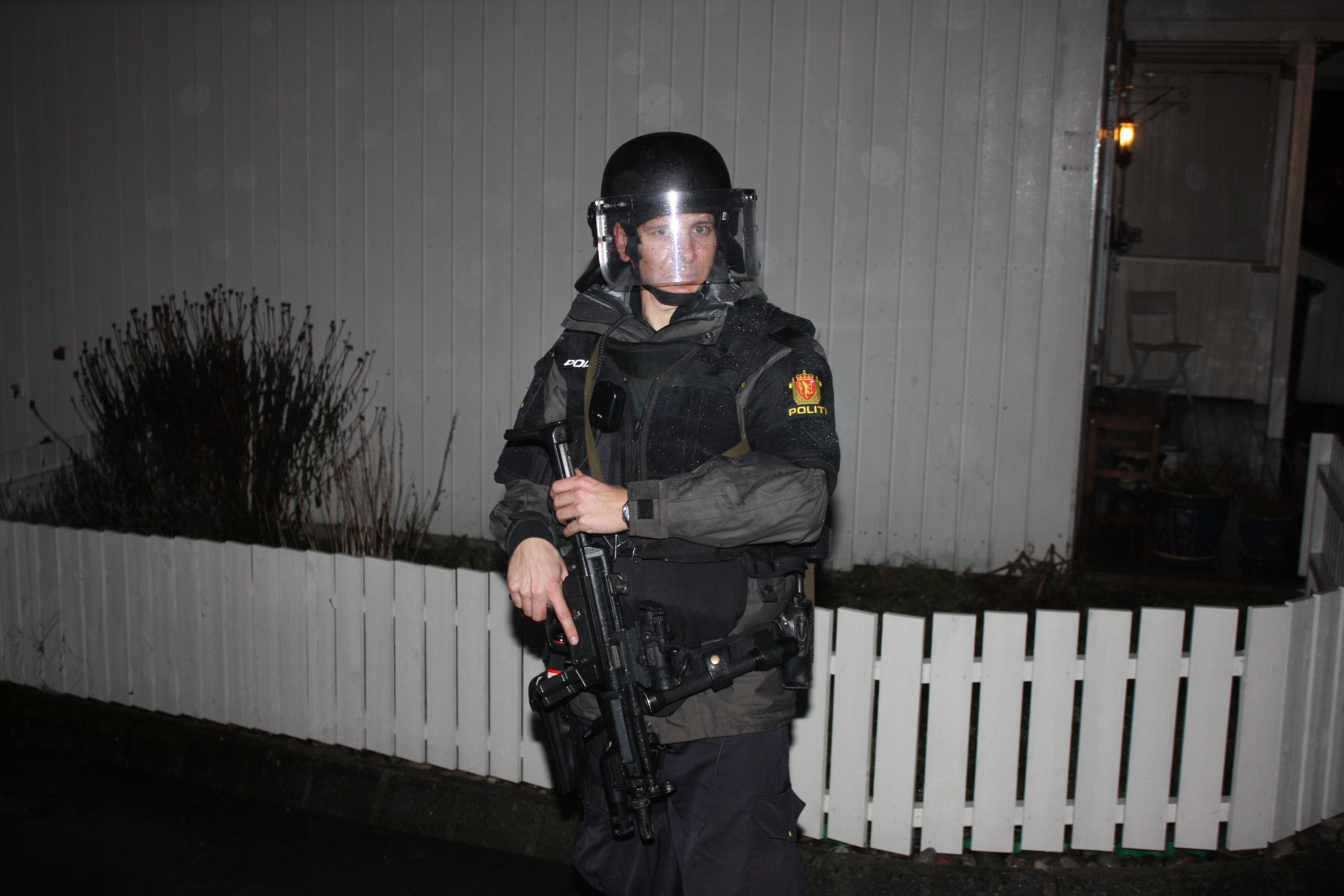
Police officer armed with a Heckler & Koch MP5.

The police have two main types of uniforms, type I is used for personnel which primarily undertake indoor work, and type II is used for personnel which primarily undertakes outdoor service. Both types have summer and winter versions, and type I also has a dress uniform version. Both types use black as the dominant color with light blue shirts.

Police officers were until 2025 not permanently armed with firearms during patrolling, but had weapons locked down in the patrol cars. Arming of the locked-down weapons required permission from the chief of police or someone designated by him. The police use Heckler & Koch MP5 submachine guns, Glock G45 semi-automatic pistols, DD4 M4A1 RIII semi-automatic rifle and DD5 V4 as sniper rifle. Delta uses Diemaco C8 assault rifles. Norwegian police officers use electroshock weapons called Taser X2 which they started using in 2018.

Previously the police used a decentralized information technology system developed during the mid-1990s. As late as 2012 servers were still being run with Windows NT 4.0 from 1996 and log-on times were typically twenty minutes. The new IT-system D#2 was introduced in 2011 and will have been taken into use by all divisions by 2012. D#2 will be operated by ErgoGroup and will have two redundant server centers. Personnel have access to the system via thin clients. The police have a system to raise a national alarm to close border crossings and call in reserve personnel. The one time it was activated the message was not received by any of the intended recipients. Since 2009 it has been possible to report criminal damage and theft of wallets, bicycles and mobile telephones without a known perpetrator(s) online.

The Norwegian Public Safety Radio has been installed in all districts. The system is uses Terrestrial Trunked Radio and allows for a common public safety network for all emergency agencies. Features include authentication, encryption and possibilities to transmit data traffic.

== Ranks ==
Police ranks of Norway
Rank	Politidirektør	Assisterende politidirektør	Politimester	Visepolitimester	Politiinspektør; Politiadvokat (appointed before 1 Aug 2002)	Politiadvokat (appointed after 1 Aug 2002)	Politifullmektig
Translation	Police Director	Assistant Police Director	Police Master	Vice Police Master	Police Inspector; Police Advocate	Police Advocate	Police Deputy
Official Translation	National Police Commissioner	Assistant National Commissioner	Chief of Police	Deputy Chief of Police	Assistant Chief of Police; Police Prosecutor	Police Prosecutor	Junior Police Prosecutor
Insignia
Rank	Politistasjonssjef; Lensmann; Politioverbetjent (appointed before 1 Aug 2002)	Politioverbetjent (appointed after 1 Aug 2002)	Politiførstebetjent	Politibetjent 3	Politibetjent 2	Politibetjent 1	Politireserven
Translation	Police Station Chief; Lensmann; Police Senior Constable	Police Senior Constable	Police First Constable	Police Constable 3	Police Constable 2	Police Constable 1	Police Reserve
Official Translation	Police Chief Superintendent	Police Superintendent	Police Chief Inspector	Police Inspector	Police Sergeant	Police Constable	Police Reserve
Insignia

== See also ==
- Crime in Norway
- Incarceration in Norway
- Royal Police Escort
