= Immigration officer =

Law enforcement official

An immigration officer is a law enforcement official whose job is to ensure that immigration legislation is enforced. This can cover the rules of entry for visa applicants, foreign nationals or those seeking asylum at the border, detecting and apprehending those that have breached the border and removing them, or pursuing those in breach of immigration and criminal laws.

== United Kingdom ==
In the United Kingdom, immigration officers are present in the Border Force and Immigration Enforcement – both law enforcement commands of the Home Office – and the National Crime Agency. Powers are conferred by the Immigration Act 1971 and who also act in accordance with Immigration Rules. The Immigration Rules are statutory instruments laid down by Parliament under Section 3(2) of the 1971 Act which governs the regulation of entry into the United Kingdom. The Rules are amended by Primary Legislation when required, and provide a framework to ensure that those that come to, or remain in, the UK do so legally, and those that do not can be removed.

Immigration officers have the power of arrest and detention conferred on them by the Immigration Act 1971, when both at ports and inland. In practice, port immigration officers exercise powers under Schedule 2 of the Immigration Act 1971 and inland immigration Officers under S28A-H of the Immigration Act 1971 and paragraph 17 of Schedule 2. This has led to separate training for port and inland officers, where port officers are not trained in Police and Criminal Evidence Act 1984 (PACE). "Designated Immigration Officers" are port immigration officers who have been trained in detention under PACE. The archetypal power of arrest is for an immigration or nationality offence, which involves a person's entitlement to be in the UK. Though immigration officers also have powers of arrest outside immigration and nationality offences under the Criminal Justice and Public Order Act 1994, the Crime and Courts Act 2013, and under the Terrorism Act 2000 discussed below. NCA Officers holding immigration powers are tri-warranted, also holding the powers of a constable and customs officer.

Border Force and Immigration Enforcement immigration officers are typically uniformed, carrying personal protective equipment including body armour, handcuffs and extendable batons. NCA officers with immigration powers can work in uniformed or undercover capacities.

Border Force immigration officers can also hold the powers of a customs officer, typically carrying out both customs and immigration roles at ports of entry.

=== At ports ===
An immigration officer at a port has the power to detain any person without arrest who is not a British citizen to investigate whether they qualify for entry to the United Kingdom under Schedule 2 of the Immigration Act 1971. Schedule 2 also gives an immigration officer the power to arrest without warrant anyone who is liable to detention.

The passing of the Borders, Citizenship and Immigration Act 2009 created a provision for the Secretary of State to designate individuals as a "general customs official" and a “customs revenue official” . Immigration officers who have received the appropriate training are designated as general customs officials and can carry out customs functions in additions to their immigration ones. The passing of the act supersedes the process where the Customs Commissioners would designate officers as customs officials.

Designated Immigration Officers (DIOs) are designated by the Home Secretary, and only if they are fit and proper for the purpose, and suitably trained. Under Section 2 of the UK Borders Act 2007, DIOs can detain any person without arrest in a port in England, Wales or Northern Ireland if they think that the individual may be liable to arrest by a constable for any offence under Section 24 of the Police and Criminal Evidence Act 1984 or Article 26(1), (2) or (3) of the Police and Criminal Evidence (Northern Ireland) Order 1989, or if there is a warrant for their arrest. They can be searched and detained using reasonable force for up to three hours, and can be pursued if they leave the port. If a DIO detains a person, they must arrange for a constable to attend as soon as is reasonably practicable. It is an offence to abscond, assault or obstruct a DIO exercising their powers under this section.

However, Immigration Officers also have far broader powers under the Terrorism Act 2000 to examine, question, and search anyone in order to establish whether or not they appear to be or have been concerned in the commission, preparation or instigation of acts of terrorism. A person may be detained under Schedule 7 for up to 9 hours. The Immigration Officer need not have reasonable suspicion that the detainee has in fact been involved in terrorism. The detainee has a duty to provide the Immigration Officer with all information requested and a failure to do so constitutes an offence, punishable by 3 months imprisonment and a fine.

=== Inland ===
Under Section 28A of the Immigration Act 1971, Immigration Officers have wide-ranging arrest powers. They can arrest:

- non-British citizens if they are in the country illegally, or have remained beyond the conditions imposed on them.
- non-British citizens if, be means of deception, they obtain, or seek to obtain, entry or permission to remain in the UK.
- any person who assists a breach of EU Immigration Law by a non-EU national.
- any person who assists a breach of asylum law for gain.
- any person who assists a facilitate a breach of a deportation order in force against an individual who is a citizen of the European Union.
- any person who obstructs an Immigration Officer or other person lawfully acting in the execution of the 1971 Act.
- any person who has an immigration stamp or replica immigration stamp in their possession.
- any person who
  - alters a registration card with intent to deceive or to enable another to deceive,
  - has a false or altered registration card in his possession without reasonable excuse,
  - uses or attempts to use a false registration card for a purpose for which a registration card is issued,
  - uses or attempts to use an altered registration card with intent to deceive,
  - makes or possess an article designed to be used in making a false registration card,
  - makes or possess an article designed to be used in altering a registration card with intent to deceive or to enable another to deceive.

A specially-trained Immigration Officer working in a Criminal Investigation Team also has the power to arrest without warrant any person that he has reasonable suspicion of committing criminal offences of obtaining or seeking to obtain leave to remain by deception, assisting unlawful immigration to a member state, helping an asylum seeker to enter the UK, and assisting entry to UK of anyone in breach of a deportation or exclusion order; and also several non-immigration criminal offences such as conspiracy to defraud, bigamy, perjury, theft, obtaining services by deception, fraud, forgery and counterfeiting, trafficking for sexual exploitation, possessing and making false identity documents.

An Immigration Officer can enter and search a premises owned or occupied by someone arrested for an offence without warrant for nationality documents.

It is an offence to assault an Immigration Officer, and an Immigration Officer may arrest a person if they reasonably suspect that the person has committed or is about to commit that offence.

At all times, an Immigration Officer may arrest any person that he has a reasonable suspicion of committing an indictable offence using the "any person powers" (also known as citizen's arrest) contained in Section 24A of the Police and Criminal Evidence Act 1984.

== Hong Kong ==
The immigration legislation in Hong Kong is enforced by the Immigration Department. They are also tasked with protecting the territory against terrorism, distributing identity cards and official travel documents, and take care of issues related to the territory's census and potential discrimination against those engaged in immigration related processes in Hong Kong.

== Indonesia ==
Indonesian immigration officers are immigration officers who have the status of State Civil Apparatus (Indonesian: Aparatur Sipil Negara) and serve as law enforcers and public servants at the forefront of guarding the country's gates. Based on the latest government structure, the Directorate General of Immigration (Indonesian: Direktorat Jenderal Imigrasi) is under the Ministry of Immigration and Correction of the Republic of Indonesia, a new ministry resulting from the split of the Ministry of Law and Human Rights.

== Sri Lanka ==
In Sri Lanka, as per the Immigrants and Emigrants Act no 20 of 1948, enforcement is carried out by the Department of Immigration and Emigration headed by the Controller General of Immigration and Emigration who is also the Commissioner for Registration of Persons of Indian Origin.

== Australia ==
In Australia, immigration officers are employees of the Department of Home Affairs (Australia). Immigration officers are law enforcement officials that operate under the Migration Act 1958.

The term "immigration officer" can apply to officers of the department who assess and make decisions on visa applications.

It can also be related to Australian Border Force Officers that perform immigration duties at sea ports, airports, immigration detention facilities, and field compliance. Border Force Officers have additional powers under the Australian Border Force Act 2015.

== South Korea ==
In South Korea, immigration officers are employees of Korea Immigration Service which is a part of the Ministry of Justice.

Immigration Officers oversee Human Movements at Port of Entry, protect the Border and issue Visa and enforce Korean Immigration Laws.

They also conduct Naturalisation to get the South Korean Citizenship, control Permanent Residency of South Korea and other foreign citizens in Korea.

== See also ==
- UK Immigration Service
- U.S. Immigration and Customs Enforcement
- Department of Home Affairs (Australia)
- Australian Border Force
- National Police Immigration Service (Norway)
