= VPU =

VPU may refer to:

== Technology ==
- Vector processing unit, a special processor architecture with features of pipelining for vector processing
- Versatile Processor Unit, an Intel AI accelerator for inference, computer vision and deep learning
- Video processing unit and visual processing unit, related to graphics processing units
- Vision processing unit, a class of processor intended for accelerating machine vision tasks

== Other uses ==
- Viral protein U (Vpu), a regulatory protein found in HIV-1
- Vancouver Police Union, a trade union in Canada
