= Vancouver's Downtown Ambassador Program =

Crime-prevention program

Vancouver's Downtown Ambassador Program was put into place in an effort to create a friendly, welcoming atmosphere for people visiting Vancouver’s downtown area as well as to prevent crime. The ideas of the Ambassador Program parallel thoughts from the Broken Windows Theory, also used for crime prevention in New York City.

== Background ==
In 1993, the program was developed by the Downtown Vancouver Business Improvement Association (DVBIA) and consisted of four ambassadors hired as entertainment (music and comedy) for pedestrians. Later in the year, 40 volunteer ambassadors were brought in to provide help to any downtown mall visitors. The successes of the program led to changes for the ambassadors. In 2000, the roles of the ambassadors changed from being mainly information providers to including first aid responsibilities and crime prevention. The ambassadors also increased their presence from tourist-season work to year-round service.

In 2006, Vancouver’s mayor, Sam Sullivan, introduced “Project Civil City.” The project was aimed at solving public disorder problems in order to prepare the city for the publicity of the 2010 Winter Olympics. One part of the project was to expand the existing Downtown Ambassador Program in order to ensure a public sense of security and to lower crime rates. With the added financial support of the City of Vancouver, in April 2007, Genesis Security, a British Columbia-based security company, was contracted to staff the revised program. In 2012, the program consisted of 18 full-time paid ambassadors.

== Roles ==
The Vancouver Downtown Ambassador Program aims to make downtown Vancouver's streets a comfortable and safe place to work, live, and visit. Ambassadors help the public with directions, check in with local businesses, and act as role models for good citizenship. They are a liaison between the Downtown business community and the DVBIA, and they are also a friendly face for visitors to ask their questions about the area.

== Controversy ==
An issue common in urban ambassador programs around North America is ambassadors giving the impression that they are police officers. In Vancouver's case, this issue can become a liability for the ambassadors, the DVBIA, and the City of Vancouver.

There has been tension between the Vancouver Police Department and the Downtown ambassadors in the past. In 2008, the question arose as to whether the ambassadors were worth what the city spent on them. Tom Stamatakis, Vancouver Police Union president at the time, stated, “… I still have a number of concerns around the use of tax dollars to fund that program.” His main concern, along with the VPD and civil councillors, was that a large amount of tax dollars was only going to benefit a small region of Vancouver

There have been questions about whether or not the ambassadors go through adequate training to ensure they are ready to take to the streets. There have also been several human rights allegations against the ambassadors. In 2008, formal complaints were issued, stating that the ambassadors discriminated against the homeless by harassing them and imposing no-go zones on individuals. However, in 2012, a human rights tribunal ruled that the ambassadors did not discriminate against the homeless.
