= Constables' Central Committee =

The Constables' Central Committee is one of the tripartite organisations that make up the Police Federation of England and Wales. It is the representative body for those police officers of the rank of constable, of which there are approximately 107,000 members.

== History ==
The Constables' Central Committee was founded as part of the Police Federation of England and Wales, which was set up by the Police Act 1919, following two police strikes. The Liberal government of David Lloyd George was frightened by the prospect of the police going on strike and created the Police federation of England and Wales and withdrew the right of officers in the UK to strike.

Police officers are technically not employees, but crown-appointed warrant holders. This allowed the police their unique independent status and notionally provides the citizens of the UK a protection from any government that might wish unlawfully to use the police as an instrument against them.

The Police Federation was set up by the statute to represent the rights and interests of its members, hence its recent involvement in campaigns involving drugs and licensing hours. Many observers mistakenly equate the Police Federation with a trade union. This is an incorrect assumption as it was set up specifically by the government of the day not to be a trade union.

== Organisation ==
The Constables' Central Committee is the largest of the tripartite organisations of the Police Federation along with the Inspectors' Central Committee and the Sergeants' Central Committee. Each of the 43 police forces within England and Wales has its own federation structure based on the three branch boards based on rank. The Constables' Central Committee join the other two rank boards to meet as a Joint Board, or in the Metropolitan Police's case, as a Joint Executive.

The 43 forces are grouped into eight regions. Each of the regions send a Constable, Sergeant and Inspector to the National Body called the Joint Central Committee. Due to its size, The Metropolitan Police Federation send two officers of each rank to the Joint Central Committee.

The incumbent Chairman of the Constables' Central Committee is Julie Nesbit, who also takes the role of Constables' National Police Women's Representative. The Committee shares its HQ with the other rank boards and the Joint Central Committee, at Federation House, Leatherhead. This HQ also incorporates the federation's national training centre and hotel facility for Federation members.
