= Association of Scottish Police Superintendents =

The Association of Scottish Police Superintendents (ASPS), established in 1924, is a Scottish police staff association. It represents all police superintendents and chief superintendents in the country.

The association exists to liaise with police and legal authorities on service-related welfare issues, and to shape both policy and operational practice.

== See also ==
- Scottish Police Federation
- Association of Chief Police Officers in Scotland
