= Police Federation for Northern Ireland =

The Police Federation for Northern Ireland (PFNI) is the representative body to which all members of the Police Service of Northern Ireland belong up to and including the rank of Chief Inspector, as well as the ranks of reserve and part-time officers. The federation was established on 15 July 1971 as a result of the Police Act (NI) 1970. There are 6800 members as of June 2016 according to their website and the current chairman is Liam Kelly.

The make-up of the federation is designed with similarity to political constituency. Representatives are provided for five larger regional divisions and various districts within. A fixed number of representatives are allocated to each district and to each region with a predetermined percentage within the ranks of constable, sergeant, inspector and part-time officer. Only four of the regions are based on the geography of Northern Ireland with Region 5 being dedicated to officers of Training Branch, Road Policing, Urban Region TSG, Headquarters, and Crime Operations. Regions 1 to 4 are allocated representation on an equal basis of region, district and officer count whereas Region 5 has additional allocation rules based on each department. Region 1 is based exclusively in the Greater Belfast area with four districts. Region 2 covers the south of Northern Ireland and is divided into four districts; G District (Fermanagh & Omagh District Council Area), F District (Cookstown, Dungannonand Magherafelt), ABC District (Armagh, Banbridge & Craigavon) and NMD (Newry, Mourne and Down).3 covers the west and is divided into eight districts. Region 4 covers the north and is divided into nine districts. Meetings take place on six obligatory occasions each year with further meetings occurring upon approval. The federation votes internally to elect a Central Committee comprising 10 constables, 5 sergeants, 3 inspectors and one part-time officer. The Central Committee then elects four full-time officials from its members. These positions include Chairman, Secretary, Assistant Secretary, and Treasurer. Federation offices are based in Garnerville and positions are open to election once every three years.

The federation seeks to provide "Welfare and Efficiency" for the police service with its main activities performed in maintaining the RUCGC - PSNI Benevolent Fund and providing legal advice. Representatives meet the Secretary of State, the Northern Ireland Office, and the Security Minister regularly as well as the occasional meet with the Prime Minister. Negotiations involve pay, pensions, and general conditions as well as consultation on all levels of service within the PSNI. The federation is a member of the Luxembourg based European Confederation of Police (EUROCOP) which serves as a go-between for the European Parliament and forum for matters of mutual concern including terrorism, pay and working conditions. Representatives also attend conferences regularly in the United Kingdom, United States of America, and Republic of Ireland including the International Law Enforcement Committee.

Annual reports are produced as well as various reports and press releases, much like news reports.

Obligations fall under five general categories, General Services, Health & Safety, Health Services, PFNI Applications, and Travel Services. These services branch out as the provision of, General Services: Police Treatment Centers, Credit Union, Discipline Coordination, Police Federation Lottery, Police Rehabilitation and Retraining Trust, Retired Members Card, Benefits Scheme, and RUC Benevolent Fund, Health & Safety: Health & Safety Role, Legislation information, and Appeal Boards, Health Services: BUPA Dental Plan, Critical Illness Plan, and Private Health Scheme, PFNI Applications: Legal Advice Applications, and Lottery Funding Applications, Travel Services: Family Travel insurance, Hotelshop, and Stenaline special rates.

The federation represents the police service on a similar basis to that of a trade union although the police force has no legal right to some civil actions such as a strike action.

In 1999, in response to the Patton Report, the federation produced a statement supporting radical changes to facilitate peace. With a view to recruiting Catholics for the police force, the statement suggested voluntary severance to make jobs available. It went on to plea for extra investment in constable and sergeant training and promised that, the then Royal Ulster Constabulary, had changed and was committed to evolving to meet demands and standards. The statement expressed opposition to changing the name of the police service, now the Police Service of Northern Ireland (PSNI) as a proud tradition and memorial to those officers injured or killed in connection with The Troubles, as well as opposition to changing the dark green uniform or symbols of harp and crown as representative of either community. Other views expressed the preference for neutral working areas, to be an unarmed force (in common with the Garda Síochána and UK Police in Britain), freedom from political direction, that accepting former paramilitaries or terrorists into the police is unacceptable and that a divided police force was unfeasible within such a small population.

== See also ==
- Scottish Police Federation
- Police Federation of England and Wales
