= European Confederation of Police =

EuroCOP
- European Confederation of Police
- Founded: 2002
- Headquarters: Luxembourg, Luxembourg
- Location: Europe
- Members: 230,000
- Key people: Jonne Rinne, President
- Affiliations: ETUC
- Website: eurocop.org

The European Confederation of Police (EuroCOP) is the umbrella organization umbrella organisation for 30 police unions and staff organisations in Europe. Representing the interests of over 230,000 police officers in 25 European countries, it was founded in 2002 at a conference in Roskilde, Denmark, emerging from the Union Internationale des Syndicats de Police (UISP), which had existed since 1953. It was created in order to enable further organizations, particularly ones from the United Kingdom, to join. The union's headquarters is in Luxembourg.

EuroCOP represents its members in European matters and at European Union institutions. For example, the union has an observer status at the Council of Europe. Its goals include enhancing the efficiency of police work under democratic control, the creation of norms for the qualifications of police employees, the preservation of the civil status of police officers, and the prevention of the privatization of police duties. One example of a current mission of EuroCOP has been to push the Spanish government to follow its election promise to completely de-militarize the Guardia Civil.

EuroCOP is part of the ETUC and ETUF making it one of the 10 union federations in Europe and the only one representing European police officers as an individual sector.

It is a member of the Council of Europe being part of the Conference of International Non-Governmental Organisations (INGOs) of the Council of Europe. EuroCOP is a member of ICPRA.

It is registered as a lobbyist.

In 2016 then EuroCOP president Àngels Bosch Campreciós met President Juncker and in 2018 she met Commissioner Julian King

The organization should not be confused with the idea of "Euro-Cops", EUROPOL police officers, whose jurisdiction would reach into all of Europe.

== Background ==
The European Confederation of Police (EuroCOP) is the umbrella organisation for 30 police unions and staff organisations in Europe, which includes more than 230,000 police officers from 25 countries. EuroCOP was founded in a conference in 2002 in Roskilde, Denmark as a revision to the precious Union Internationale des Syndicats de Police (UISP), which had existed since 1953. The organization was created to allow police organizations from the United Kingdom to join. EuroCOP are members of the European Union Institutions, which allows the union to have a say in the council of Europe. The goal is to enhance the police work under democratic control, to prevent private investor of police duties, and to create norms for the police employees.

== No. 83/2012 European Confederation of Police (EUROCOP) v. Ireland ==
EuroCOP filled a complaint against Ireland on 7 June 2012, dealing with the fact that police representative associations in Ireland do not have full trade union rights, including the right to join an umbrella organisation. An umbrella organization is an association of institutions, who work together formally to coordinate activities or pool resources. The EuroCOP requested that Ireland grants complete full trade union rights for the police representations in Ireland. Meaning, that the police representative associations are kept out of the overall national negotiations that ICTU conduct on behalf of their members, such as those on salaries in the public service.

== Presidents ==
- 2002–2003: Hermann Lutz
- 2003–2011: Heinz Kieffer
- 2012–2015: Anna Nelberg Dennis
- 2015–2020: Àngels Bosch Campreciós
- 2020–2022: Calum Steele
- 2022–present: Jonne Rinne

== Member organizations ==
- Association of Garda Sergeants and Inspectors (Ireland)
- Association Syndicale Autonome des Personnels de la Police d'Etat de Monaco (Monaco)
- British Transport Police Federation (United Kingdom)
- Confederazione Sindacale Autonoma di Polizia (Italy; observer)
- ELA / ERTZAINTZA (Spain)
- Federación de Sindicatos de Policía (Spain)
- Garda Representative Association (Republic of Ireland)
- Landssamband Lögreglumanna (Iceland)
- Latvijas Iekšlietu darbinieku arodbiedrība (Latvia; associate member)
- Natzionalen Poltzeyski Syndicat (Bulgaria; observer)
- Odborovy zväz Policie vsr (Slovakia)
- Österreichische Polizeigewerkschaft (Austria; observer)
- Panhellenic Federation of Police (Greece)
- Police Federation for Northern Ireland (Northern Ireland)
- Policijski Sindikat Slovenije (Slovenia)
- Norwegian Police Federation (Norway)
- Politiforbundet i Danmark (Denmark)
- Scottish Police Federation (Scotland)
- Sindicatul Democratic al Poliţiştilor SIDEPOL (Romania)
- SIULP (Italy)
- SLFP-Police/VSOA-Politie (Belgium)
- SNPS/NSPV (Belgium)
- SPC-CCOO Catalunya (Spain)
- Suomen Poliisijärjestöjen Liitto SPJL (Finland)
- Polisförbundet (Sweden)
- Syndicat National de la Police Grand-Ducale Luxembourg (Luxembourg)
- Verband Schweizerischer Polizeibeamter (Switzerland)
- Nezávislý odborový svaz Policie České republiky (NOSP) (Czech Republic)
- Sindicato Nacional da Policia (SINAPOL) (Portugal)
- Niezalezny Samorzadny Zwiazek Zawodowy Policjantów (NSZZP) (Poland; observer)
- Lietuvos VRS Respublikiné Profesiné Sajvisited (LPTU) (Lithuania)
- Vereniging van Middelbare en Hogere Politieambtenaren (VMHP) (Netherlands)
