= Statspolitiet (1931–1936) =

Statspolitiet (English:The State Police) was a police force in Norway.

Statspolitiet was a rapid reaction force, consisting of 76 men, who had fighting riots as their main task. It was established June 11, 1931 and directly subordinated the Norwegian Ministry of Justice. At this point of time the police in general was a municipal responsibility. Most famous and infamous were Statspolitiet for their efforts against the strikers during the Menstad conflict. This led to the Labour movement, after the Labour Party formed a government in 1935, to proceed to reform the police. Statspolitiet was dissolved with expanded duties and was renamed to Utrykningspolitiet in 1936. All police authorities in Norway were subordinated the Norwegian National Government.

In 1941, during World War II, Statspolitiet was reintroduced as a name by the Norwegian collaborators of the Quisling regime. Neither this police force's working methods nor the organization can be compared to the police force in the 1930s. No Norwegian police force after the war has subsequently called itself Statspolitiet.
