= Norwegian Bureau for the Investigation of Police Affairs =

Law enforcement oversight agency in Norway

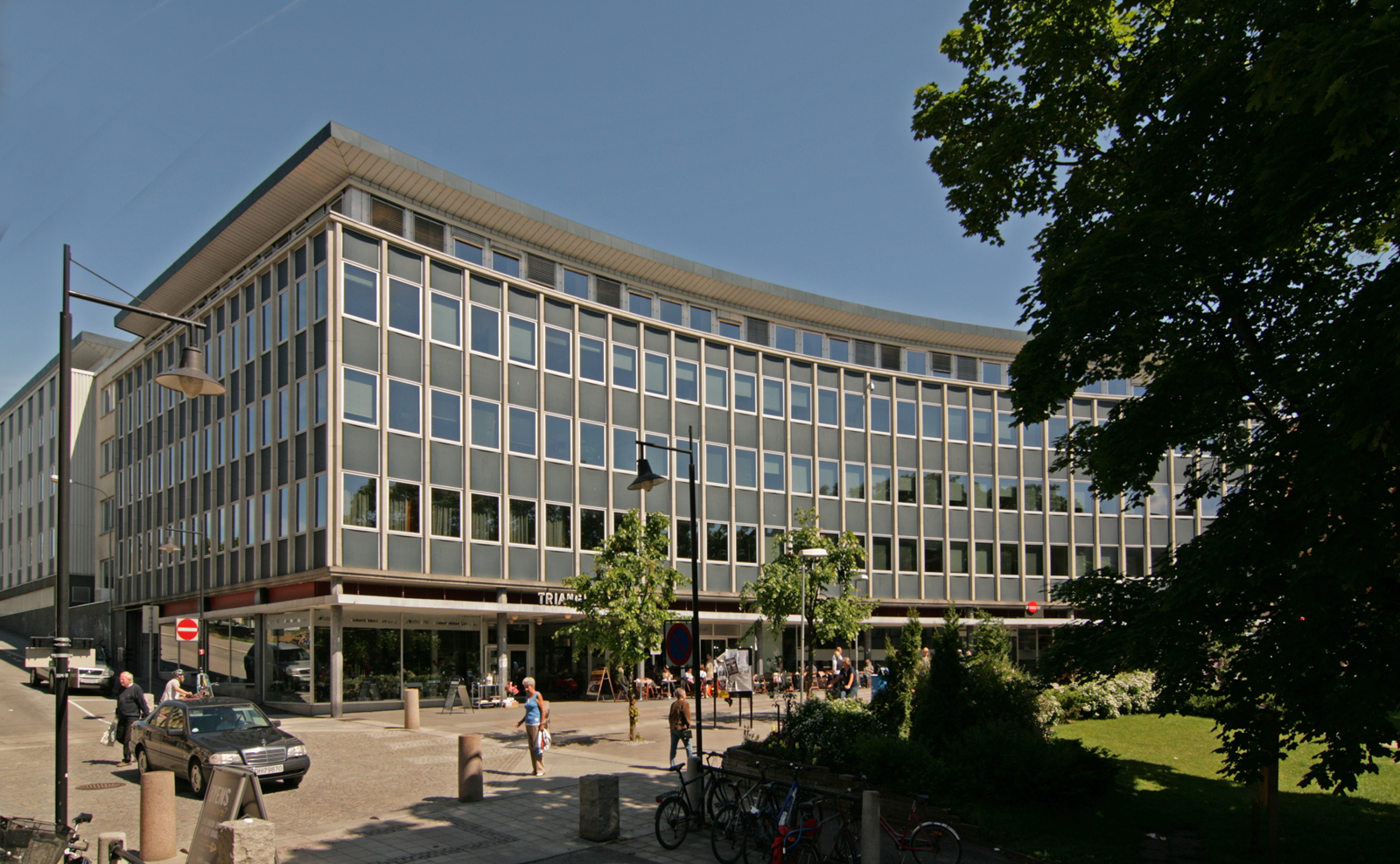
The agency is based at Triangelgården in Hamar

The Norwegian Bureau for the Investigation of Police Affairs (Norwegian: Spesialenheten for politisaker) is a government agency under the Ministry of Justice and the Police. Located in Hamar, it is responsible for investigating reports of misconduct and criminal offenses by members of the Norwegian Police Service and the Norwegian Prosecuting Authority.
