= Astri Aas-Hansen =

Norwegian politician

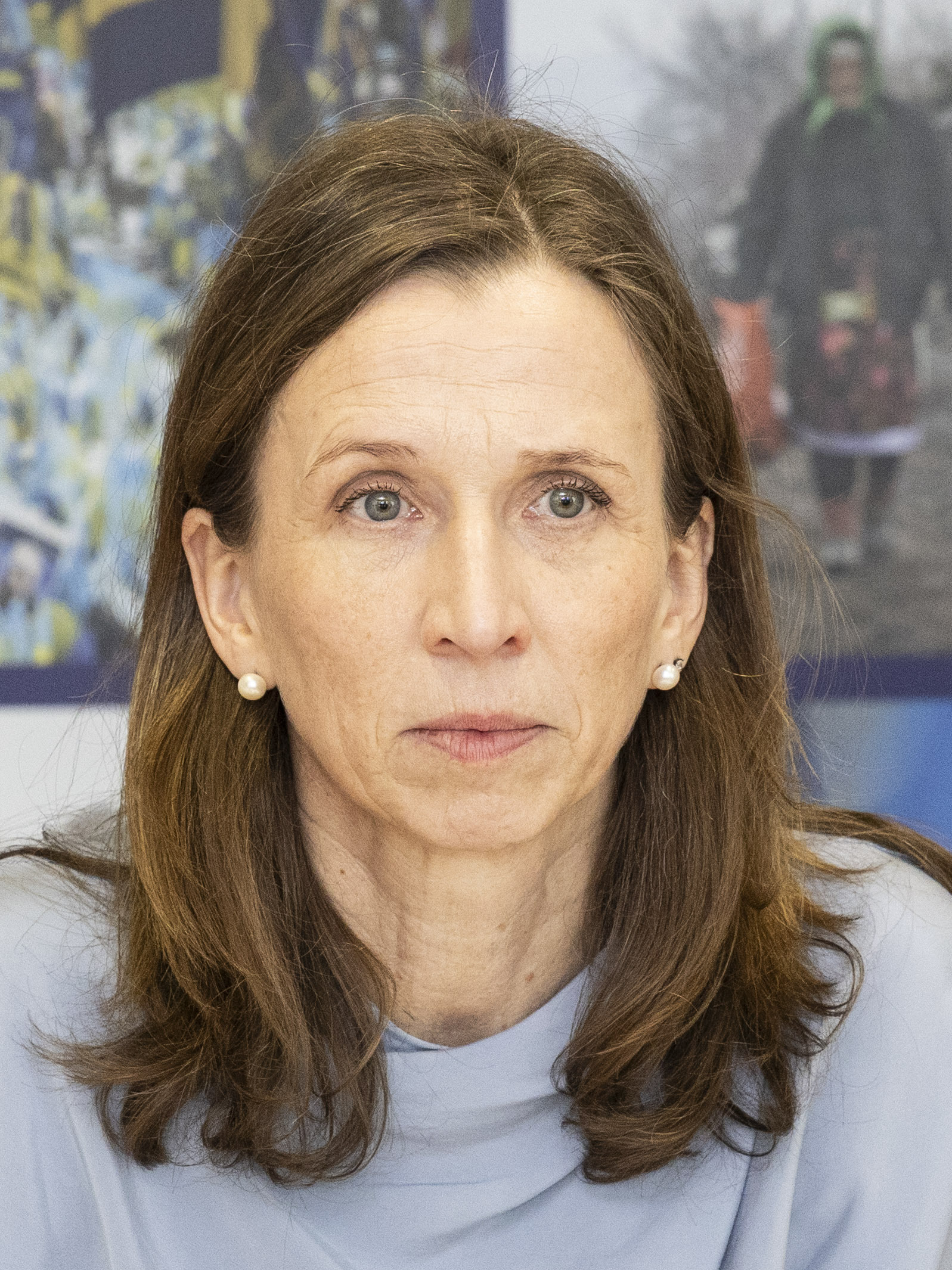
- Aas-Hansen in 2026

Minister of Justice and Public Security
- Incumbent
- Assumed office 4 February 2025
- Prime Minister: Jonas Gahr Støre
- Preceded by: Emilie Mehl

Personal details
- Born: 16 December 1970 (age 55) Lillesand, Aust-Agder, Norway
- Party: Labour
- Education: University of Oslo
- Profession: Lawyer

Astri Aas-Hansen (born 16 December 1970) is a Norwegian lawyer and politician for the Labour Party. She has served as the minister of justice since February 2025.

== Political career ==
From 1995 to 2002 she worked as an advisor for the Labour Party.

In 2005, when Stoltenberg's Second Cabinet assumed office, she was appointed a political adviser in the Ministry of Justice and the Police. She was promoted to State Secretary in February 2007, and remained there until April 2013.

She joined the Norwegian Parliamentary Intelligence Oversight Committee in 2019 and served as its deputy leader from 2019 to 2021, when she took over as leader.

=== Minister of Justice ===
Following the Centre Party's withdrawal from government, she was appointed minister of justice and public security on 4 February 2025.

==== 2025 ====
Upon becoming justice minister, she expressed skepticism and doubt about her predecessor's proposal of allowing the police to search people without cause.

She announced in early March that the government would be aiming to propose a sexual consent law by Easter, fulfilling an objective made in the government's platform. The proposal did however face some criticism by defence attorney Mette Yvonne Larsen, who argued that the law would contribute to issues with evidence and potentially compromising the security of the judicial system. Once the proposal was presented, a draft was subsequently sent to the Storting and was later approved in June.

In October, she announced that the government would be seeking to increase the amount of time the police can keep fifteen to eighteen-year-olds in custody in severe criminal cases. Additionally, she stated that they also would seek to increase the amount of time the police can hold individuals under the age of fifteen in custody and also increase the sentence for carrying weapons in public spaces.

==== 2026 ====
In February 2026, she announced that the government would be removing collective protection for Ukrainian men between 18 and 60, with a few exceptions, with the intention for them to follow the regular immigration process and rules when applying for asylum.

The Standing Committee on Scrutiny and Constitutional Affairs determined in June that Aas-Hansen had misled Parliament on two occasions when responding do questions from member Bent-Joacim Bentzen regarding how much the Norwegian Army had been involved in the writing of a controversial report by the Joint Rescue Coordination Centre. Her claims were denied by the Army, the Norwegian Defence University College, the 130 Air Wing and the 330th Squadron. Furthermore, she denied having breached the information obligation when delivering her responses to Bentzen.

During an informal meeting between interior and justice ministers of the European Union in the wake of the Ceuta migrant crisis, Aas-Hansen issued her support for Spain and how Spanish authorities had handled the crisis. She furthermore emphasised the importance of finding the cause of the sudden influx of migrants and how Europe can be better prepared.

Following the annual convention of the Progress Party, Aas-Hansen refuted claims from party leader Sylvi Listhaug that criminal clans and other criminal organisations were getting a foothold in Norway. She further cited the government's efforts to strengthen police capabilities to combat organised crime and strengthen rules and regulations. She furthermore argued the governemnt would govern without polarising rhetoric.

== Civic career ==
From 2002 to 2017, she worked as a lawyer. She has also given lectures at the University of Oslo and Nesna University College.

Following her stint in Stoltenberg's second government, she returned to her former job in Advokatfirmaet Elden.

In 2017, she became a district court judge at the Oslo District Court.

== Personal life ==
She hails from Lillesand Municipality, and graduated from the University of Oslo with the cand.jur. degree in 1999. Up until November 2025, she had resided in Asker Municipality while working in Oslo, before relocating back to her native Lillesand and gave her Asker residence to her son.
