= Portuguese National Police Officers' Union =

The Portuguese National Police Officers' Union (Portuguese: Sindicato Nacional da Polícia (SINAPOL) was created in 2004 and represents all the ranks of the Portuguese Public Security Police (PSP).

SINAPOL was member of EUROCOP (the European Confederation of Police), from 2005 to 2013.

SINAPOL returned as member of EUROCOP in 2021.

SINAPOL is also in UGT (União Geral de Trabalhadores), one of the main labour confederation in Portugal.

SINAPOL is one of the representative police unions in Portugal, status that allows SINAPOL to be present in all collective bargain and labour negotiations with the portuguese government, regarding police officers rights.

Its current president (since the 2004) is Armando Ferreira, re-elected several times and always without any opposition, he is recognized by is direct speech and dedicated mission for the recognition of police officers rights. Usually he confronts fearless the police director and interior minister, when other police union presidents remain in silence fearing some kind of persecution.

SINAPOL has a national wide representation, including the autonomous regions of Azores and Madeira, being the only police union with offices in both autonomous regions. In mainland Portugal, SINAPOL has the main office in Lisbon and another office in O'Porto
