= National Police Immigration Service (Norway) =

Norwegian Police Service unit

The National Police Immigration Service (NPIS) (Norwegian: Politiets utlendingsenhet) is the unit in the Norwegian Police Service for handling immigration cases.

The NPIS's main tasks are to register asylum seekers who come to Norway and to establish their identity, forcibly return people without lawful residence and to run the police immigration detention centre.

The NPIS is part of the immigration administration in Norway and cooperates closely with other agencies in the immigration field. The Directorate of Immigration (UDI) and the Immigration Appeals Board (UNE) are key agencies in this context. As part of the police, the NPIS has the authority to use coercive measures.

The NPIS is a special national police agency, that assists the rest of the police service in immigration cases. The unit was established in 2004.

== Leaders ==
- Knut Holen (2004)
- Arne Jørgen Olafsen (2005–2006)
- Ingrid Wirum (2007–2013)
- Kristin Ottesen Kvigne (2013–2016)
- Morten Hojem Ervik (2016–present)
- Arne Jørgen Olafsen (2018–present) while Hojem Ervik is on leave.
