= Scottish Police Federation =

- Coat of Arms of the Scottish Police Federation

- Scotland in the UK and Europe
- Formation: 1919
- Legal status: Police Act 1996
- Purpose: Welfare and efficiency of policing in Scotland
- Headquarters: Glasgow
- Location: Scotland
- Members: 18,000 (constables, sergeants, inspectors, chief inspectors, cadets and special constables)
- Chair: David Threadgold
- Vice Chair: Brian Jones
- General Secretary: David Kennedy
- Deputy General Secretary: Lorna Cunningham
- Website: www.spf.org.uk

The Scottish Police Federation (SPF) is an organisation representing Scottish police officers. It has approximately 18,500 members across the Police Service of Scotland. It campaigns on issues that affect pay and conditions though police officers are not allowed to strike and reports to authorities on matters which affect their welfare and efficiency.

The Scottish Police Federation is led by General Secretary Calum Steele who has been in post since October 2008.

== Chairperson ==
1919–20
Peter McAusland, Edinburgh
1920
Edward Malcolm, Aberdeenshire
1920–21
Neil Macleod, Glasgow
1921–22
John J Ryan, Glasgow (1st term of office)
1922–23
George Kay, Ayrshire
1923–24
John J Ryan, Glasgow (2nd term of office)
1924–25
William Webster, Edinburgh
1925–27
John J Ryan, Glasgow (3rd term of office)
1927–30
Arthur McIntosh, Glasgow
1930–32
John J Ryan, Glasgow (4th term of office)
1932–33
William Cowie, Glasgow (1st term of office)
1933
Alexander Alexander, Glasgow
1933–34
John B Rothney, Aberdeenshire
1934–39
William Cowie, Glasgow (2nd term of office)
1939–42
Thomas O Porter, Wigtownshire
1942–44
Andrew K Robertson, Glasgow
1944–46
Robert Allan, Ayrshire
1946–47
Archibald Carswell, Argyll
1947–49
William Mortimer, Aberdeen City
1949–50
George Watson, Ayr Burgh
1950–54
James Spowart, Perthshire & Kinross-shire
1954–56
James L Murchie, Glasgow
1956–57
John D Stephen, Edinburgh
1957–58
Thomas McCallum, Berwick, Roxburgh & Selkirk
1958–61
Charles L Jack, Glasgow
1961–63
Norman Clark, Edinburgh
1963–66
Donald McCulloch, Glasgow
1966–68
John Black, Glasgow
1968–70
Stuart Waldman, Glasgow
1970–73
Ronald Munro, Fife
1973–76
Donald McLean, Glasgow/Strathclyde
1976–78
Frederick Conner, Lothian & Borders
1978–81
Hamish Forrest, Strathclyde
1981–82
John Hamilton, Strathclyde
1982–84
Patrick Kennedy, Strathclyde
1984–87
Alistair W A Wallace, Strathclyde
1988–89
Kenneth MacDonald, Lothian & Borders
1989–91
Elizabeth Stewart, Strathclyde
1991–00
James Fraser, Strathclyde
2000–09
Norrie Flowers, Strathclyde
2010–12
Leslie Gray, Strathclyde
2012–16
Brian Docherty, Strathclyde
2017–20
Andrea MacDonald, West Area
2020–23
David Hamilton, North Area (Tayside)
2023-
David Threadgold, North Area

Footnote: John J Ryan, Glasgow, served four terms of office as chairman; William Cowie, BL, Glasgow, served two terms of office as chairman.

== General Secretaries ==
1919–22
William Webster, Edinburgh (1st term of office)
1922–24
John B Craib,, Ayr Burgh
1924–26
William Cowie, Glasgow
1926–28
Andrew Valentine, Midlothian
1928–30
William Webster, Edinburgh (2nd term of office)
1930–34
George Machray, Edinburgh
1934
Robert Watson, Edinburgh
1934–41
William Brander, Glasgow
1941–42
William Forgie, Glasgow
1942–51
George Mitchell, Coatbridge
1951–56
James Watson, Glasgow
1956–63
Robert McClement, Glasgow
1963–75
Daniel Wilson, Scottish North-Eastern Counties Constabulary
1975–83
Joseph Black, Strathclyde
1983–87
Alexander Gowl, Grampian
1988–91
Alistair W A Wallace, Strathclyde
1991–05
Douglas J Keil, Grampian
2005–08
Joe Grant, Strathclyde
2008– 23
Calum Steele, Northern
2023–
David Kennedy, West Area

Footnote: William Webster, Edinburgh, served two terms of office as Secretary.

== See also ==
- Association of Scottish Police Superintendents
- Police Federation of England and Wales
- Police Federation for Northern Ireland
