= Norwegian National Road Policing Service =

Agency of Norwegian police

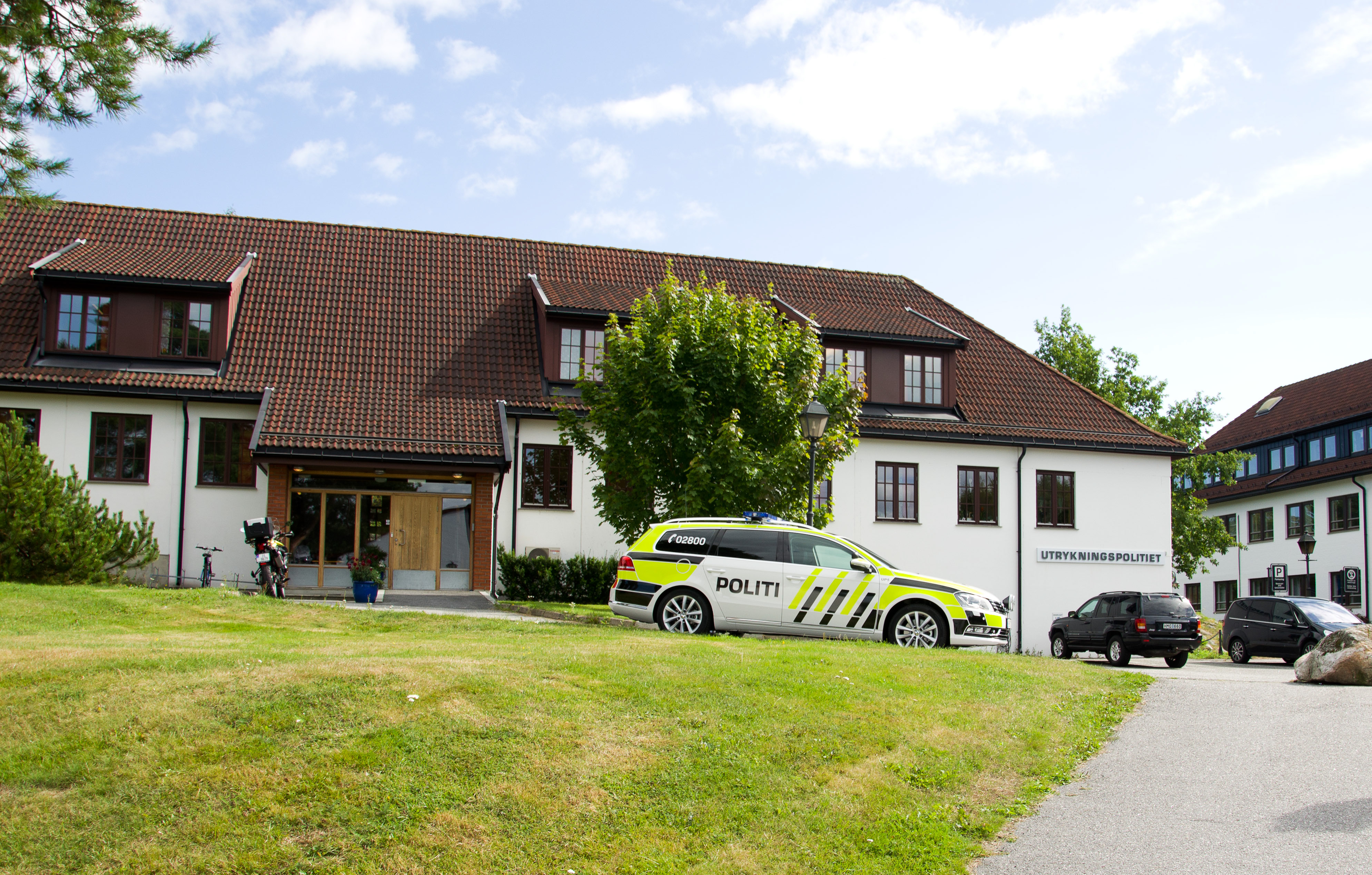
National Road Policing Headquarters in Stavern

The Norwegian National Road Policing Service (Norwegian: Utrykningspolitiet), commonly known by its abbreviation UP, is a specialty agency of the Norwegian Police Service, subordinate to the National Police Directorate. Its main task is highway patrol, in addition to managing the police reserves. As its officers have full police power it will assist police districts in special circumstances. The agency is based in Stavern and was created in 1937, replacing the former State Police agency.
