= Ministry of Justice and Public Security =

Government ministry of Norway

Royal Ministry of Justice and Public Security
- Det kongelige justis- og beredskapsdepartement

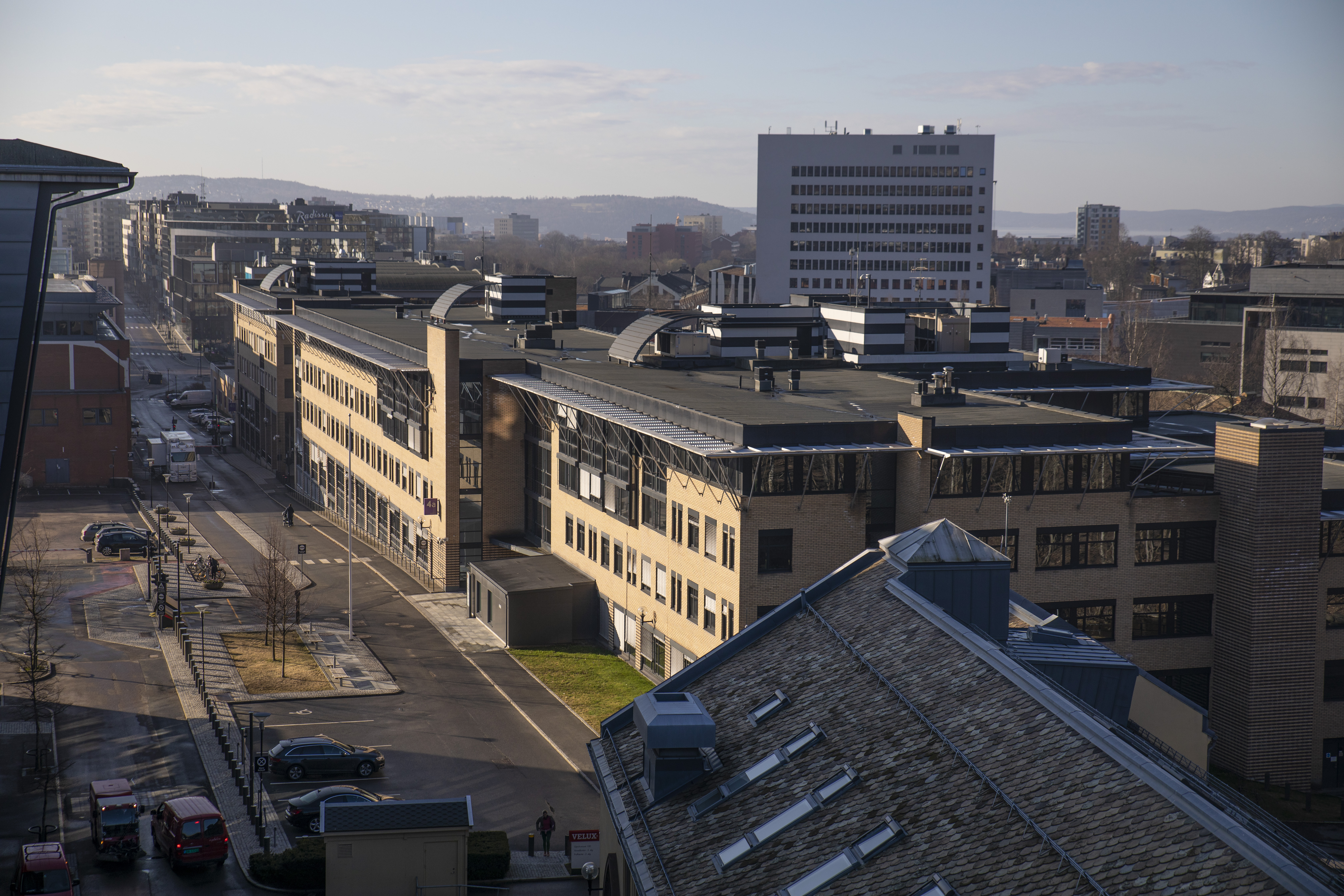

Agency overview
- Formed: 1818; 208 years ago
- Jurisdiction: Government of Norway
- Headquarters: Oslo
- Employees: 400
- Minister responsible: Astri Aas-Hansen
- Website: www.regjeringen.no/jd

The Royal Ministry of Justice and Public Security (Norwegian: Det kongelige justis- og beredskapsdepartement) is a Norwegian government ministry that oversees justice, the police, and domestic intelligence. The main purpose of the ministry is to provide for the maintenance and development of the basic rule of law. An overriding objective is to ensure the security of society and of individual citizens. The ministry was founded in 1818 and currently employs about 400 people in the central government department. Its subordinate agencies include the Norwegian Police Service, the Norwegian Correctional Service, the Norwegian Police Security Service, the Norwegian Prosecuting Authority, the Judiciary of Norway, and the Directorate of Immigration, and employ around 30,000 people. The Ministry of Justice of Norway oversees the administration of justice in Svalbard.

== History ==
The ministry was founded in 1818 and was known as the Royal Ministry of Justice and the Police from its establishment until 2012, when it was renamed the Royal Ministry of Justice and Public Security. The ministry's headquarters was bombed in the 2011 terrorist attacks, killing three employees. The ministry subsequently moved to its current location at Gullhaug Torg in Nydalen.

== People ==
The Minister of Justice and Public Security is the head of the ministry. Since February 2025 Astri Aas-Hansen has served as Minister of Justice and Public Security.

== Organisation ==
It is organised into the following sections:

- Press and public relations
- Penal and rehabilitation matters
- Legal issues
- Arctic affairs
- Police
- Rescue and readiness
- Civil rights issues
- Planning and administration
- Analytics

== Subordinate agencies ==
- Norwegian Police Service
- Norwegian Correctional Service
- Norwegian Police Security Service
- Norwegian Prosecuting Authority
- Judiciary of Norway
- Norwegian Directorate for Civil Protection
- Directorate for Emergency Communication
- Norwegian Military Prosecution Authority
- Joint Rescue Coordination Centres
- Mediation Service
- Norwegian Advisory Council on Bankruptcy
- Office for Compensation for Victims of Violent Crime
- Norwegian Bureau for the Investigation of Police Affairs
- Norwegian Civil Affairs Authority
- Crime Prevention Council
- Norwegian Centre for Violence and Traumatic Stress Studies
- Directorate of Immigration
- Directorate of Integration and Diversity

== Current issues ==
On September 8, 2006, the government commissioned an inquiry on the wrongful conviction of Fritz Moen.
