= Norwegian Public Safety Network =

Public safety network system

Nødnett - Norwegian Public Safety Network
- Type: Public safety network
- Location: Norway
- Protocols: Terrestrial Trunked Radio
- Use: police, health services, fire and rescue services, organisations involved in public safety
- Owner: Directorate for Emergency Communication (DNK)
- Operator: Motorola Solutions
- Established: 2006
- Website: www.dinkom.no

The Norwegian Public Safety Network (Norwegian: Nødnett literally Emergency Network) is a public safety network system based on Terrestrial Trunked Radio (TETRA). Nødnett is implemented by the Directorate for Emergency Communication (Norwegian: Direktoratet for nødkommunikasjon). The network is primarily used for internal and interdisciplinary communication by the police, fire departments and health services. Nødnett is also used by several organisations participating in rescue and emergency work. Planning of the network started in 1995 and in 2006 the contract to build it was awarded to Nokia Siemens Networks. As Nokia Siemens Networks was unable to complete the contract, it was passed on to Motorola Solutions in 2012. The critical infrastructure of Nødnett was finished and was operational in all districts of mainland Norway by December 1, 2015.

The network replaced nearly 300 local and regional networks which operated independently for the fire, police and healthcare agencies. Nødnett allows functionality such as authentication, encryption and higher reliability.

== Background and choice of technology ==
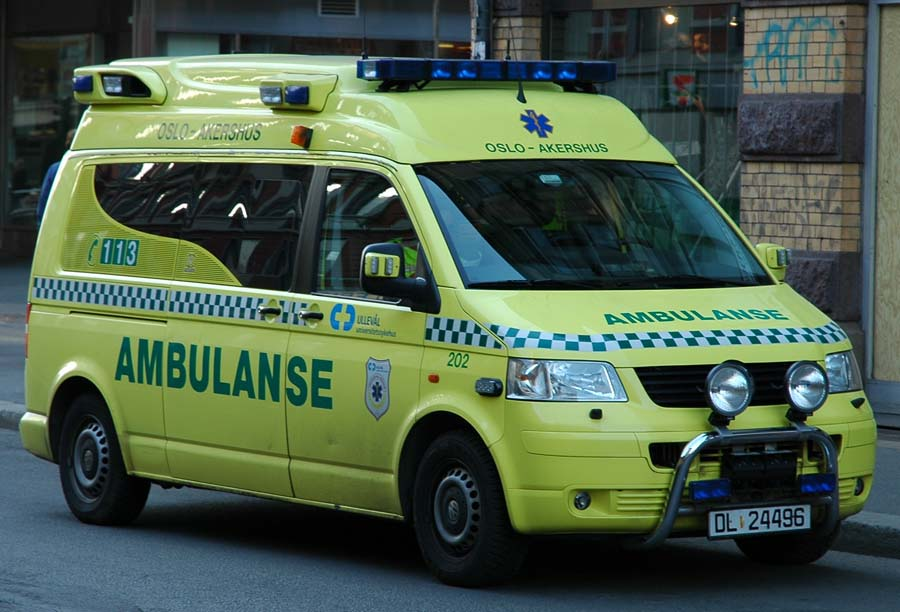
Ambulance operating in Oslo

Before Nødnett, there was one radio network for each emergency service, all based on analog radio. The old system had two main downsides: it was not encrypted with no privacy (as was requested by the Norwegian Data Inspectorate) - giving crimainals a chance to evade arrest by listen in on police radio action, and it prevented communication between agencies, which was vital during disasters and because Norway is also a member of the Schengen Agreement, which required the capability of cross-border communications. The encryption upgrade would either have had to be done through an expensive upgrade to the existing systems, or through the construction of a new, digital network. Officials also toyed with using conventional GSM, but opted against it because of the lack of functionality provided by TETRA.

There were 27 different networks for the police, one for each police district. In Oslo, Akershus and Østfold, the police had also been using Enhanced Digital Access Communication System, or EDACS since 1994 - a technology more dominant, at the time, in North America than anywhere in Continental Europe. There were 230 municipal fire department radio systems, and a manual mobile phone system for the health sector. The health network was built by the county municipalities between 1990 and 1995 that covered all parts of the health service, including paramedics, ambulance services, midwives and medical doctors. The various systems had different levels of coverage. In addition, Global System for Mobile Communication (GSM) and Nordic Mobile Telephone (NMT450) telephones were being used where encrypted communication was necessary. For a time, officials even contemplated adding encryption to the existing radio systems, but the idea was aborted after questions arose on whether the level would be sufficient and reliable. Global System for Mobile Communication – Railway (GSM-R) was also considered because at the time, the Norwegian National Rail Administration was at the time building a GSM-R network to cover the entire Norwegian railway network; it was, however, rejected because of the lack of trans-border functionality and the need for more base stations, and thus higher investment costs, and longer start-up time for calls. Eventually, the TETRA standard won due to having multiple features such as group conversations and emergency activation and the fact that it supported gear from multiple suppliers and had a fallback feature allowing users close to the base station to still communicate if part of the system broke down.

The government considered using a similar procurement solution to that in Denmark, where the spectrum was licensed to private enterprise, and the agencies purchase services from private telecommunications companies, based on conventional GSM technology. However, in Denmark this had not led to the desired results, with only Metropolitan Copenhagen being covered. Instead, the Norwegian Government chose to establish a government agency to build and operate the network. Use of the GSM and NMT450 network was insufficient because of lack of capacity in the conventional network in case of larger amounts of communication, lack of ability of group conversations, lack of priority systems and long dial-up times.

In a parliamentary hearing in 2002 both DNK director Tor Helge Lyngstøl and Minister of Justice, Odd Einar Dørum, stated that the choice of TETRA would provide sufficient data capacity. In a parliamentary decision in 2004 it was decided to opt for the open European Telecommunications Standards Institute (ETSI) as a data transmission standard, which is used by all other police TETRA systems in Europe, but this was later changed by the directorate to the proprietary TETRA Enhanced Data Service (TEDS) owned by Motorola. The latter would limit the number of supplies and would increase the investment costs.

In 2000, the annual cost of agency communication was NOK 175 million, while this had increased to NOK 260 million in 2004. The increase was largely caused by the increase in use of mobile telephones. The costs of the fire department networks was paid for by the municipalities, the health network paid for by the municipalities and the regional health authorities, and the police networks by the respective police districts.

== Implementation ==
Work with the system started in 1995, when the Norwegian Board of Health Supervision took initiative for a new mobile telecommunications platform. The issue was coordinated by the Ministry of Justice, and the issue was first discussed politically in 1997, and in 1998 a project group was created. In 2001, a pilot project was established in Trondheim, which included all three agencies. The trial was successful and terminated in June 2003. Later that year, the Parliament of Norway made the principal decision to establish the network. Quality control of the project was concluded in June 2004, and construction was estimated at NOK 3.6 billion.

The procurement process was initially led by the Ministry of Justice and the Police, in cooperation with the Ministry of Health and Care Services, the National Police Directorate, the Directorate for Health and Social Affairs and the Directorate for Civil Defence and Emergency Planning. The public tender was launched in May 2005, and on 22 December 2006 the contract was signed with Nokia Siemens Networks. The project is the largest single information technology contract ever awarded in Norway. The Directorate for Emergency Communication was established on 1 April 2007.

Original plans called for the system to be built between 2007 and 2011. Implementation was planned in six phases, numbered zero through five. Between phases zero and one, an evaluation of the process was planned.

Phase	Area	Completed
0	Oslo, Akershus, Østfold, southern Buskerud	May 2010
1	Hedmark, Oppland	November 2013
2	Northern Buskerud, Vestfold, Telemark, Agder	June 2014
3	Rogaland, Hordaland, Sogn og Fjordane	June 2015
4	Møre og Romsdal, Trøndelag	December 2014
5	Nordland, Troms, Finnmark	December 2015

By June 2007, the project was delayed by half a year. One of the major delays in the project has been the development of the software for the health sector's communication centers—which consist of emergency wards, casualty wards, emergency dispatch centers and aircraft coordination centers. The system is being developed by Frequentis in Austria, who have stated that they did not receive sufficient specifications. In December 2009, the state granted NOK 110 million extra for development of the system. Health workers will therefore be taking the network into use in May 2010, after the police and fire departments in Follo and Østfold. Representatives for the Police Directorate have criticized the implementation model and stated that in most other countries, the system was implemented first just for the police and afterwards taken into use by the fire and paramedic agencies. For instance, Østfold Police District had installed a new center in February 2008, but had to wait 21 months to take it into use while waiting for Public Safety Radio.

The Police Directorate sees the use of the encrypted communication as the system's greatest benefit, and has stated that it sees no reason for the implementation to stop while it is being evaluated, and that there is no alternative to implementing it nationally. The system was first taken into use in Østfold and Follo in December 2009, and by Oslo in March 2010. In Oslo, the police chose to close the analog network down before the TETRA system had been installed in all vehicles, and instead give all officers hand-held devices, to speed up the closing of the old network, which is regarded as a security hazard. Traditionally, journalists have learned about events by listening to the police radios. The police have appointed press officers who will inform the press about newsworthy incidents. The alarm center for the fire departments in Østfold and Follo started using the system in June 2010.

In August 2010, the emergency health communication centers in Østfold and the casualty ward at Fredrikstad Hospital started using the system. This was followed by the emergency rooms in Halden and Aremark, in Rakkestad and Sarpsborg, and in Oslo. For the health sector, phase zero involved 40 communication centers, of which 20 were emergency rooms, 16 casualty wards at hospitals, one air ambulance coordination center and three emergency health communication centers, in addition to radios in the 150 ambulances that serves the region.

The official opening of the network took place on 17 August 2010. In October 2010, Arne Johannesen, the leader of the Norwegian Police Federation, stated that he wanted to place the building of the radio network on hold and instead use the funding for a new information technology system for the police force, named D#2.

DNK carried out tests with the system in 2010 for firefighters using self-contained breathing apparatus in structure fires, and found the system to be sufficient. Similar test were carried out by Oslo Fire Department later that year, and they found that the radio system was insufficient for their needs. Oslo Fire Department concluded that the DNK tests were only successful because of the use of additional directional gateway/repeater-radio equipment. Because of this firefighters in Oslo continued to use the old ultra-high frequency radios during indoor fires. Both the Norwegian Police Security Service's bodyguard service and the service for protection of the royal family have opted to not use the new radio system, citing poor coverage indoors and while lying on the ground, even in downtown Oslo. The services have stated that this does not allow for interoperability with other agencies, which is a drawback in case of major incidents. Also the joint rescue coordination centers, the Norwegian Air Ambulance and the 330 Squadron which operates Westland Sea King search and rescue helicopters have opted out of using the system because of poor coverage. During the 2011 Norway attacks at Utøya, located in northern Buskerud, police officers from surrounding police districts were not able to communicate with local police because the area did not have coverage for the TETRA system.

== Organization ==
Nødnett is owned by the Directorate for Emergency Communication, which is subordinate to the Ministry of Justice. The ministry signed an agreement with Nokia Siemens Networks to install the system. In 2012, Motorola Solutions signed an agreement to take over the project.

The directorate is led by Tor Helge Lyngstøl and has its offices in Nydalen in Oslo.

The cost of constructing the network has been covered by the ministry. The costs of operating and maintaining the network are covered by the users, who also purchase their own terminals. Payment to the directorate is by an annual subscription fee per terminal, based on the terminal's use. For a terminal only used for stand-by, the annual subscription cost is NOK 1,700 per year (2016), while that for a terminal in a control room is NOK 45,000 (2016). As the cost of running the network is fixed independently of the amount of traffic, there is no cost for using the network. As additional users start implementing the system, the costs per subscriber will be reduced.

== Network ==
The Terrestrial Trunked Radio network has three components: the core net, which is a centralized computer center based on an Internet Protocol structure; the transmission net, which connects the core net, the radio net and other connection points with high-capacity lines; and the radio net, which consists of about 2100 base stations with antennas in masts, on buildings and in some tunnels. The network is controlled by Motorola. In case a base station no longer can communicate with the core net, the base station can still relay communication within its range. Should the base station fall out or operations occur in areas without coverage, the terminals can communicate directly with each other.

All communication from mobile terminals to the base stations is encrypted with a key known only to the base station and the terminal. For group conversations, two keys are used, one from the terminal to the base station, and one from the base station to all users. In addition, there are 32 fixed keys used for terminal-to-terminal communication should the base station fall out. In addition, the police can use a user-to-user encryption where the communication is encrypted all the way through the network from the one user to the other.

Nødnett ensures 100% population coverage and 86% area coverage, which exceeds any of the existing GSM networks. This includes good coverage indoors, to aid fire fighters, as well as full coverage of the coastline and coverage up to 2,500 meters (8,000 ft) height for aircraft. Nødnett gives full coverage along all national and county roads. The system also allows interoperability towards the maritime radio. The network also allows for transmission of data at a speed of 12-13 kbit/s.

There has been raised criticism against several fundamental shortcomings in the network system. The most fundamental is the lack of indoor coverage. This has in part been reversed by increasing the signal strength in urban areas and installing repeaters at for instance medical clinics, Oslo Courthouse and Oslo Airport, Gardermoen. Other shortcomings are that the location of base stations are publicly known, allowing for easy sabotage and increased investment costs because of the choice of the proprietary TEDS instead of the open ETSI system.

== Terminals ==
The system has two types of receivers: radio terminals, which can either be hand-held or mounted in vehicles, and desktop equipment for control centers. The system will include 40,000 radios throughout the country. Compared to the analog network, the digital radio equipment will be smaller and have options for additional equipment such as hands free, and allow special radios for motorcycles, snowmobiles, boats, undercover activities and smoke diving. Communication can either be performed as one-to-one conversations, group calls for predefined or ad-hoc groups, with radios able to be part of several groups, or as walkie talkies in areas without network coverage. The digital transmission reduced background noise and allows monitoring terminal identity to prohibit unauthorized use. All radios are equipped with an emergency button that will give priority in the network.

Control room terminals will have new functionality including identification of all users and radio terminal positioning, radio and telephone inquiries made on the same equipment, use of either loudspeakers or head sets, and allowing operators to listen to each other's conversations. Operators have access to telephone books and speed dials, touch screen operations of voice and data traffic, monitoring of other talk groups, simultaneous calls to several talk groups and access to voice logs.
