= Norwegian Police Federation =

Norwegian police trade union

- Politiets Fellesforbund
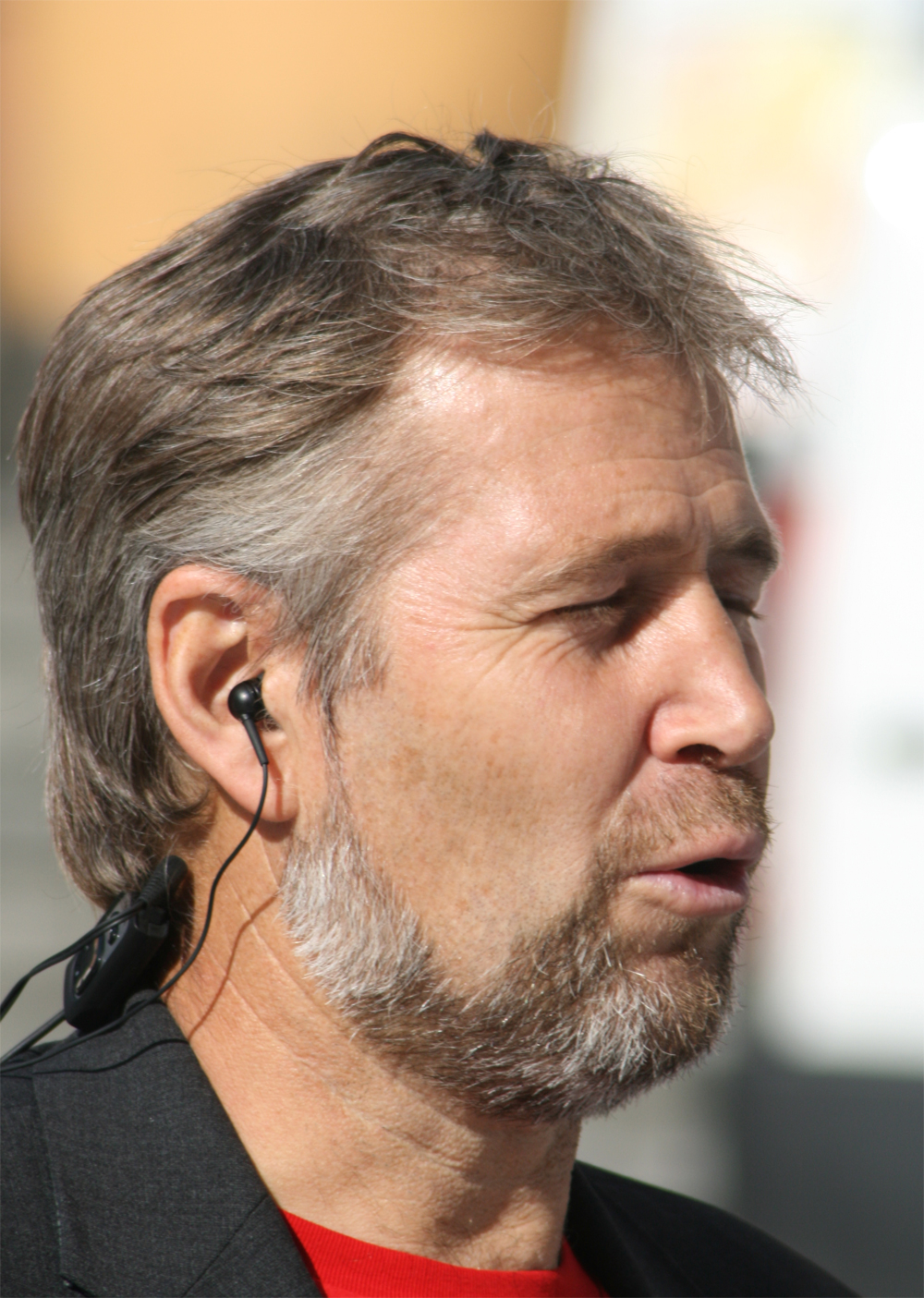
- Arne Johannessen, former head of the federation
- Founded: 1997
- Headquarters: Norway
- Key people: Arne Johannessen (2000–2013)
- Affiliations: Confederation of Unions for Professionals, Norway; European Confederation of Police

The Norwegian Police Federation (Norwegian: Politiets Fellesforbund) is the trade union which organizes employees from all levels within the police force. The federation is a member of the Confederation of Unions for Professionals, Norway and the European Confederation of Police. It is illegal for police officers to strike. The organization was established in 1997. Arne Johannessen was head of the organisation from 2000 to May 2013.
