= Vancouver Police Union =

Canadian trade union

VPU
- Vancouver Police Union
- Founded: 15 July 1918
- Headquarters: Vancouver, BC Canada
- Location: Canada
- Members: 1,450
- Key people: Ralph Kaisers, president
- Affiliations: CPA
- Website: www.vpu.ca

The Vancouver Police Union (VPU) is a trade union representing 1,450 front-line police officers, jail guards and special constables of the Vancouver Police Department in Vancouver, British Columbia, Canada.

== History ==
The Vancouver Police Union received its charter from the Trades and Labour Council (TLC) under the name Vancouver Police Federal Association, Local 12, on 15 July 1918, making it the second unionized police force in Canada. Unlike many other police unions, the VPU survived the backlash against police rank and file organizations following the British police strikes in 1918 and 1919, the Boston Police Strike, and the Winnipeg General Strike of 1919. Police unions were outlawed in many jurisdictions and subsequently reduced to "police associations." As a result, the VPU was the first police union certified under the new industrial relations regulatory regime in 1945, and remained one of the few rank and file police organizations that were covered by labour legislation. It therefore enjoyed an advantage in collective bargaining with such things as mandatory arbitration in disputes with management compared with other police organizations.

== Role ==
The VPU is the collective bargaining agent for approximately 1,450 members of the Vancouver Police Department and negotiates labour contracts. It also represents its members in disciplinary cases and cases relating to the Workers' Compensation Act and Employment Standards Act.

Through its president and spokesperson, the union acts as a political lobby on behalf of its membership. The union opposed the Insite safe injection site in Vancouver, calling it an "unmitigated disaster" for the Downtown Eastside and claiming that all it has accomplished is the creation of a "sense of entitlement" for the neighbourhood's drug addicted population. The union also questioned the credibility of former mayor Sam Sullivan in his capacity as the then chair of the police board. Critics of the Vancouver Police have been publicly denounced by the union, particularly lawyers Phil Rankin, Cameron Ward, and John Richardson of the Pivot Legal Society.

During the 2022 Vancouver municipal election, the union took the unprecedented step of endorsing candidates in the election. The union supported Ken Sim and his ABC slate. VPU President, Ralph Kaisers, went on to stand in the 2025 by-election. Kaisers won 13% of the vote, losing to Sean Orr, who is a vocal critic of the VPU. The relationship between the VPU and ABC has raised concerns with UBC political science lecturer Stewart Prest stating, "at a certain point that starts to erode the appearance, and perhaps even the reality, of insulation between elected officials and the police force."

Union president Tom Stamatakis is also the vice-president of the Canadian Police Association. The Vancouver Police Union’s office address is 1819 Victoria Diversion, Vancouver, BC.

== See also ==
- Police union
