= Police Federation of England and Wales =

Mandatory union alternative for police officers

- Founded: 1919
- Headquarters: Federation House, Leatherhead
- Location: England and Wales
- Members: 130,000+
- Website: www.polfed.org

The Police Federation of England and Wales (PFEW) is the statutory staff association for police constables, sergeants, inspectors, chief inspectors and special constables in the 43 territorial police forces in England and Wales. Under UK labour law, the police are prohibited from joining ordinary trade unions to defend pay and working conditions, by the Police Act 1996, because of the view that a police strike would pose an exceptional public safety risk. The PFEW was originally established by the Police Act 1919 as an alternative system, which would serve to represent staff, and where disputes could be resolved through arbitration so long as the government (as employer) continued to bargain in good faith. The Federation is not a trade union, but operates similarly to one in practice, bargaining collectively with police forces and the Home Office.

PFEW represents more than 130,000 members. Members can elect not to pay subscriptions and thereby not receive the legal representation and other benefits that paying members receive, but they still continue officially to be members of the Federation. Superintendents and chief superintendents are represented by a separate staff association, the Police Superintendents' Association of England and Wales (PSA), while the most senior officers are members of the National Police Chiefs' Council (NPCC).

== History ==
The Police Federation of England and Wales was set up by the Police Act 1919 after two British police strikes in 1918 and 1919. The government of the day were frightened by the prospect of the police going on strike and created the PFEW and withdrew the right of officers in the UK to strike.

Police officers hold office and are not employees. Each officer is an independent legal official and not an "agent of the police force, police authority or government". This allows the police their unique status and notionally provides the citizens of the UK a protection from any government that might wish unlawfully to use the police as an instrument against them. Many observers mistakenly equate the Police Federation with a trade union. This is technically an incorrect assumption, as it was set up specifically by the government of the day not to be a trade union; however in reality the Federation does function in a similar manner. It negotiates with key decision makers including the government and chief constables on all matters concerning its membership's pay, allowances, hour of duty, annual leave, pensions and other conditions of service. However, unlike a union, the federation is controlled entirely by serving police officers, has no political affiliations, and has no powers to call a strike. That is not to say the federation remains aloof from applying political pressure, as shown by the successful 1976 ballot regarding the right to strike and the 2012/13 "Plebgate" affair.

== Organisation ==
Each of the 43 police forces in England and Wales has its own Federation branch board and council. The 43 forces are grouped into eight regions. Due to its size, the Metropolitan Police Federation branch board is structured differently.

At the end of December 2012, the PFEW announced it would be independently reviewed. The review was conducted by Sir David Normington and the Police Federation accepted all 36 recommendations of the review in May 2014 and started working through making these organisational changes.

As such, an Interim National Board (INB) was set up (formerly the Joint Central Committee) which had responsibility for national pay negotiations on behalf of its members. This has now been superseded by the National Board. It also performs many other functions, such as training, administering legal representation and liaising with government and other national bodies on policy and legislative matters. The present national board chair is Steve Hartshorn.

The PFEW's headquarters is at Leatherhead, Surrey, in a complex which also incorporates the Federation's national training centre and a hotel facility for Federation members.

== Controversies ==
The chair and general secretary of PFEW both retired after a "turbulent period" on 7 April 2014. Steve Williams and Ian Rennie announced their plans to retire from the police service at the end of May. Steve White was elected as chair and Andy Fittes elected as General Secretary at the Police Federation's Annual Conference in May 2014.

At the same conference (on 21 May 2014), the Home Secretary Theresa May announced that public funding of the Police Federation would end in August 2014.

On 4 March 2026, three members of the national board, including chief executive Mukund Krishna, were arrested by the City of London Police's Domestic Corruption Unit on suspicion of fraud by abuse of position.

== See also ==
- Constables' Central Committee
- European Confederation of Police
- UK labour law
