= Great Resignation =

2021–2023 surge in job quits

After U.S. resignations plummeted during the initial stages of the COVID-19 pandemic, they quickly rose to reach record numbers, peaking in late 2021. March 2021 – June 2023: approximate period of the Great Resignation, where quits exceed the previous record January 2015 – March 2021; July 2023 – January 2025

The Great Resignation, also known as the Big Quit and the Great Reshuffle, was a mainly American economic trend in which employees voluntarily resigned from their jobs en masse, beginning in early 2021 during the COVID-19 pandemic. Among the most cited reasons for resigning included wage stagnation amid rising cost of living, limited opportunities for career advancement, hostile work environments, lack of benefits, inflexible remote-work policies, and long-term job dissatisfaction. Most likely to quit were workers in hospitality, healthcare, and education. In addition, many of the resigning workers were retiring baby boomers, who are one of the largest demographic cohorts in the United States.

Some economists have described the Great Resignation as akin to a general strike, especially with regard to retail workers. However, workforce participation in some regions had returned to or even exceeded the pre-pandemic rate. This suggests that instead of remaining out of the workforce for extended periods (which can be financially difficult, especially at a time of high inflation), many workers were simply swapping jobs. Some regretted quitting their old positions.

The term "Great Resignation" was coined by Anthony Klotz, a professor of management at University College London's School of Management, in May 2021, when he predicted a sustained mass exodus. In response, businesses have increased the rate of automation, creating a boom in robotics and artificial intelligence. Furthermore, while workers might feel empowered by being able to quit as soon as they see fit, they might struggle to climb up the career ladder due to their lack of experience and professional connections. Klotz later predicted the plateauing of the quit rate in 2023, and the end of the Great Resignation. By mid-2023, the quit rate more or less returned to what it was in 2019.

== Background ==
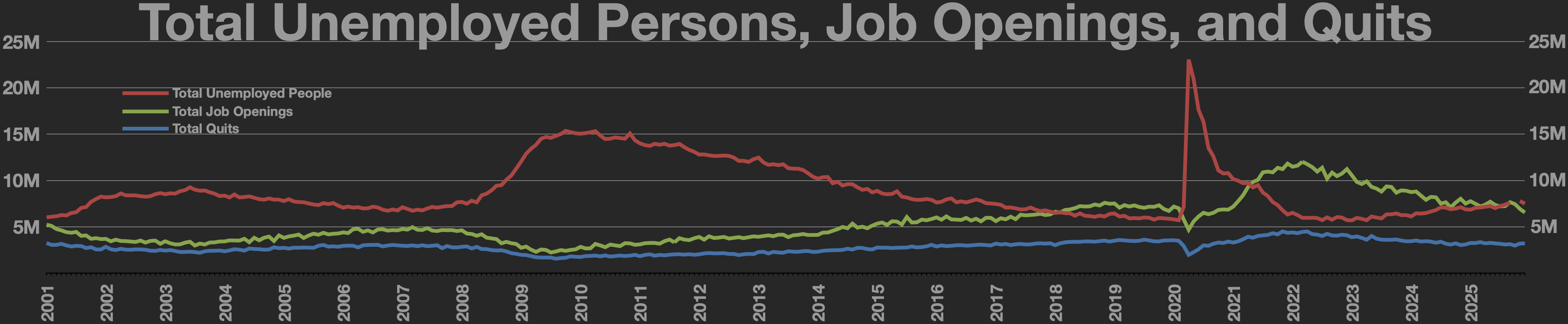
Total unemployed people Total job openings Total quits

Between December 2000, when quit rates were first measured by the United States Department of Labor, and February 2021, roughly a year following the beginning of the COVID-19 pandemic, the U.S. resignation rate never surpassed 2.4% of the total workforce per month. High quit rates indicate worker confidence in the ability to get higher paying jobs, which typically coincides with high economic stability and low unemployment rates. Conversely, during periods of high unemployment, resignation rates tend to decrease as hire rates also decrease. For example, during the Great Recession, the U.S. quit rate decreased from 2.0% to 1.3% as the hire rate fell from 3.7% to 2.8%.

Resignation rates in the U.S. during the pandemic initially followed this pattern. In March and April 2020, a record 13.0 and 9.3 million workers (8.6% and 7.2%) were laid off, and the quit rate subsequently fell to a seven-year low of 1.6%. Much of the layoffs and resignations were driven by women, who disproportionately work in industries that were affected most by the lock-downs, like service industries and childcare.

As the pandemic continued, however, workers began to quit their jobs in large numbers despite initially high unemployment. The hospitality industry was especially negatively impacted during this time, which will present new challenges and opportunities for its eventual recovery.

== Causes ==
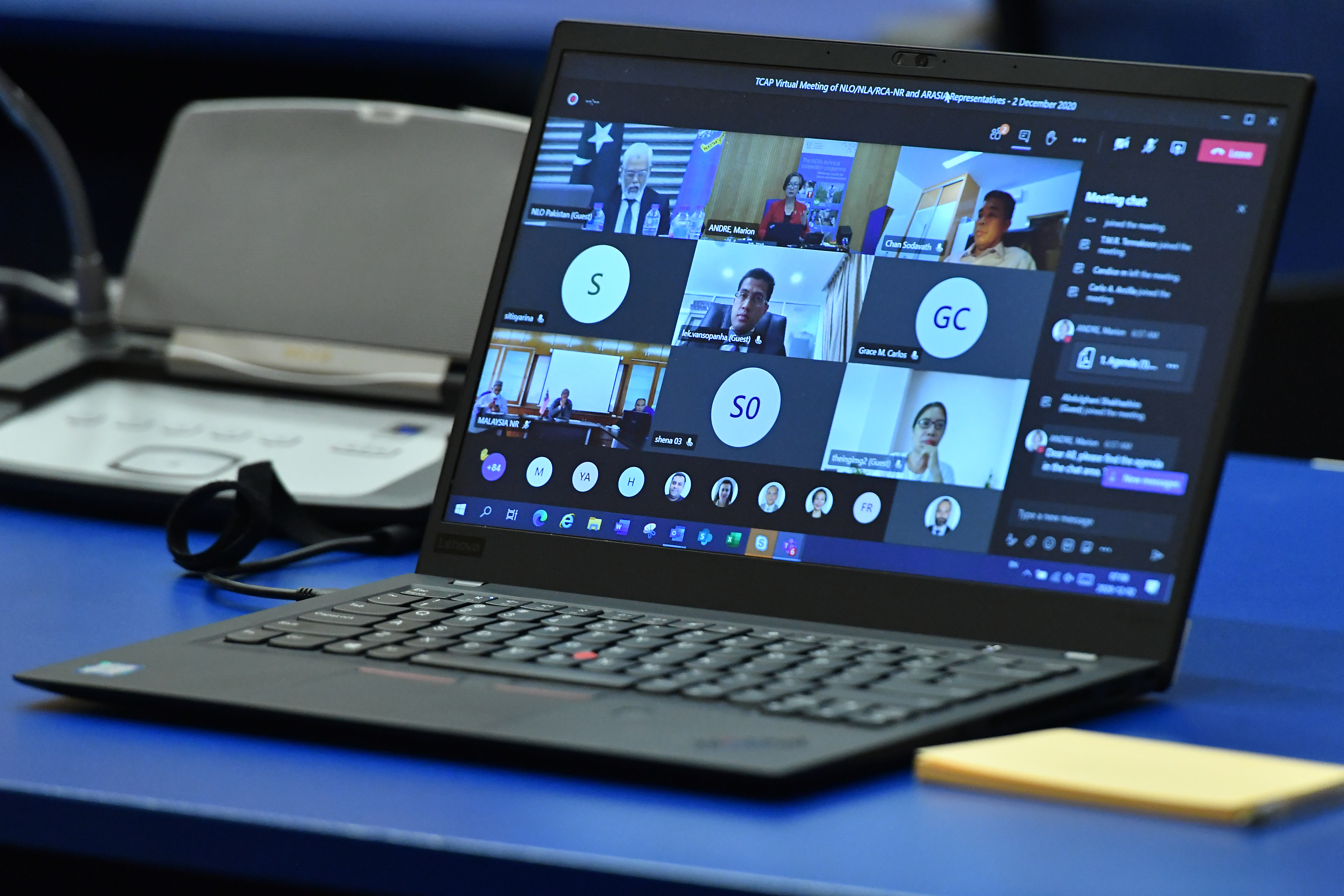
COVID-19 lockdowns necessitated remote work arrangements; workers later advocated for more permanent remote work policies.

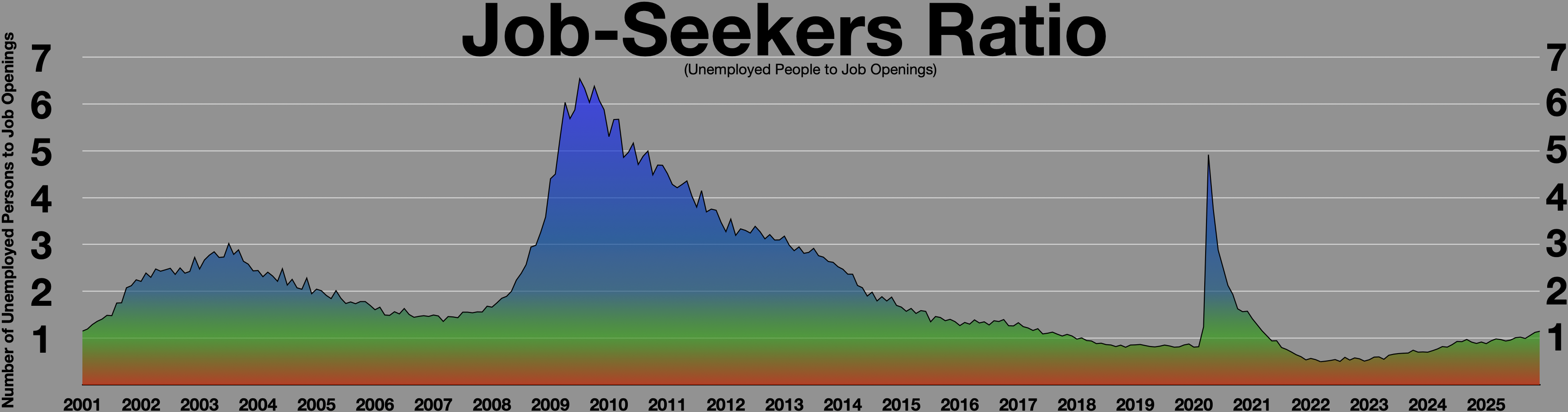
Job seekers ratio Cold job market Balanced job market Hot job market

According to Microsoft's Work Trend Index, more than 40% of the global workforce considered quitting their job in 2021. The COVID-19 pandemic allowed workers to rethink their careers, work conditions, and long-term goals. As many workplaces attempted to bring their employees in-person, workers desired the freedom that remote work afforded them during the COVID-19 pandemic, as well as schedule flexibility, which was the primary reason to look for a new job of the majority of those studied by Bankrate in August 2021. Additionally, many workers, particularly in younger cohorts, are seeking to gain a better work–life balance. In the U.S., connections are also being drawn to reported increases in workplace stress and employee burnout. Moreover, millions of people now have long COVID; this disability can alter the ability or desire to work. Lambert (2022) finds that the concept of labor market segmentation is useful in explaining resignation rates across different industries.

Restaurants and hotels, industries that require in-person interactions, have been hit the hardest by waves of resignations. COVID-19 stimulus payments and rises in unemployment benefits allowed those who relied on low-wage jobs for survival to stay home, although places where unemployment benefits were rolled back did not see significant job creation as a result. On the other hand, many workers who felt dissatisfied with their jobs reported that they cannot resign due to economic barriers. Sekou Siby, president and CEO of the U.S. nonprofit Restaurant Opportunities Center United, commented, "There's more competition across industries, so workers are feeling more empowered than ever before, but that doesn't mean everyone is able to leave their current jobs."

According to a study conducted by Adobe, the exodus is being driven by Millennials and Generation Z, who were more likely to be dissatisfied with their work. More than half of Gen Z reported planning to seek a new job within the next year. Harvard Business Review found that the cohort between 30 and 45 years old had the greatest increase in resignation rates. Racial minority, low-wage, and frontline workers are also more dissatisfied with their work in the United States, according to the asset management firm Mercer.

An IMF working paper by Carlo Pizzinelli and Ippei Shibata focused on causes of the loss in employment within the U.S. and U.K. labor markets in comparison to pre-COVID-19 levels. They identified job mismatch (that is, mismatch between the areas where people search for work and where the most vacancies are) as playing a "modest" role, being less significant than after the 2008 financial crisis. The effect of the pandemic on women, sparking the so-called "She-cession", was deemed as accounting for some 16% of the total U.S. employment shortfall but little to none of the shortfall in the U.K. Meanwhile, the authors attribute 35% of the shortfall in both the U.K. and U.S. to older workers (aged 55–74) withdrawing from the labor force. On the other side, Harvard Business Review reported resignation rates for those aged 60–70 actually fell in 2021 (in comparison to 2020 rates).

Some suggested that the tightness of the labor market was not due to workers resigning en masse or turning towards self-employment, but instead due to a shortage of migrant workers caused by travel restrictions during the pandemic and a general rise in anti-immigrant sentiment.

== Impacts ==
There is disagreement as to whether or not the Great Resignation is having or had a lasting effect. Although quit rates remained high in late 2021 and early 2022, many workers in Western countries returned to the labor force in large numbers. In general, an aging population and a labor shortage accelerate industrial automation, not just to replace the "missing" workers but also to cut costs.

=== In the United States ===
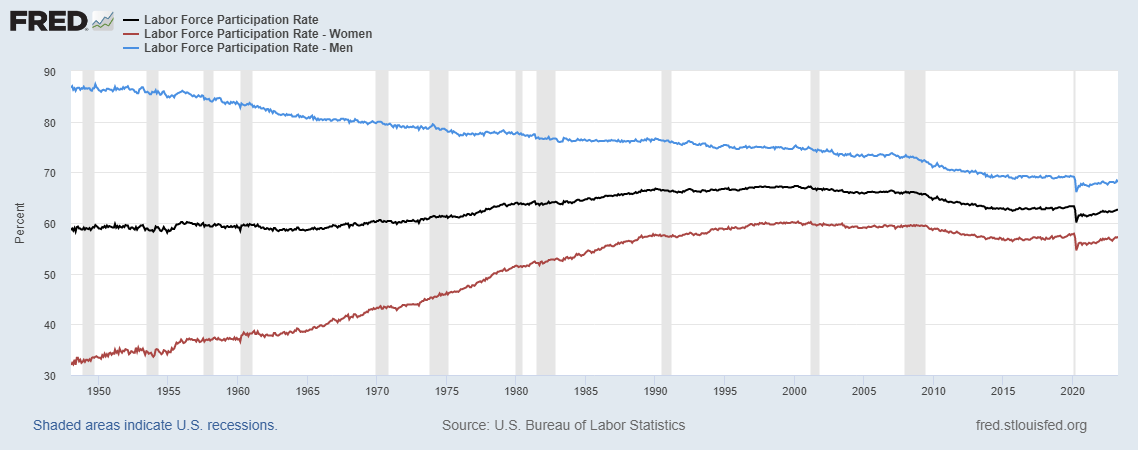
U.S. workforce participation has increased since the worst of the COVID-19 pandemic.

According to the Bureau of Labor Statistics, a total of 47 million Americans quit their jobs in 2021. Resignations are consistently the most prevalent in the South, where 2.9% of the workforce voluntarily left their jobs in June, followed by the Midwest (2.8%) and the West (2.6%). The Northeast is the most stable region, with 2.0% of workers quitting in June. The COVID-19 stimulus checks likely provided the financial security needed for many workers to voluntary resign their positions. Furthermore, some of the people behind the Great Resignation were retiring Baby Boomers, the youngest of whom reached their mid-60s in the early 2020s. According to the Federal Reserve Bank of St. Louis, many Baby Boomers chose to retire early during the pandemic, resulting in 2.4 million more retirements than predicted between February 2020 and August 2021.

According to a PricewaterhouseCoopers survey conducted in early August 2021, 65% of employees said they were looking for a new job and 88% of executives said their company was experiencing higher turnover than normal. A Deloitte study published in Fortune magazine in October 2021 found that among Fortune 1000 companies, 73% of CEOs anticipated the work shortage would disrupt their businesses over the next 12 months, 57% believed attracting talent is among their company's biggest challenges, and 35% already expanded benefits to bolster employee retention.

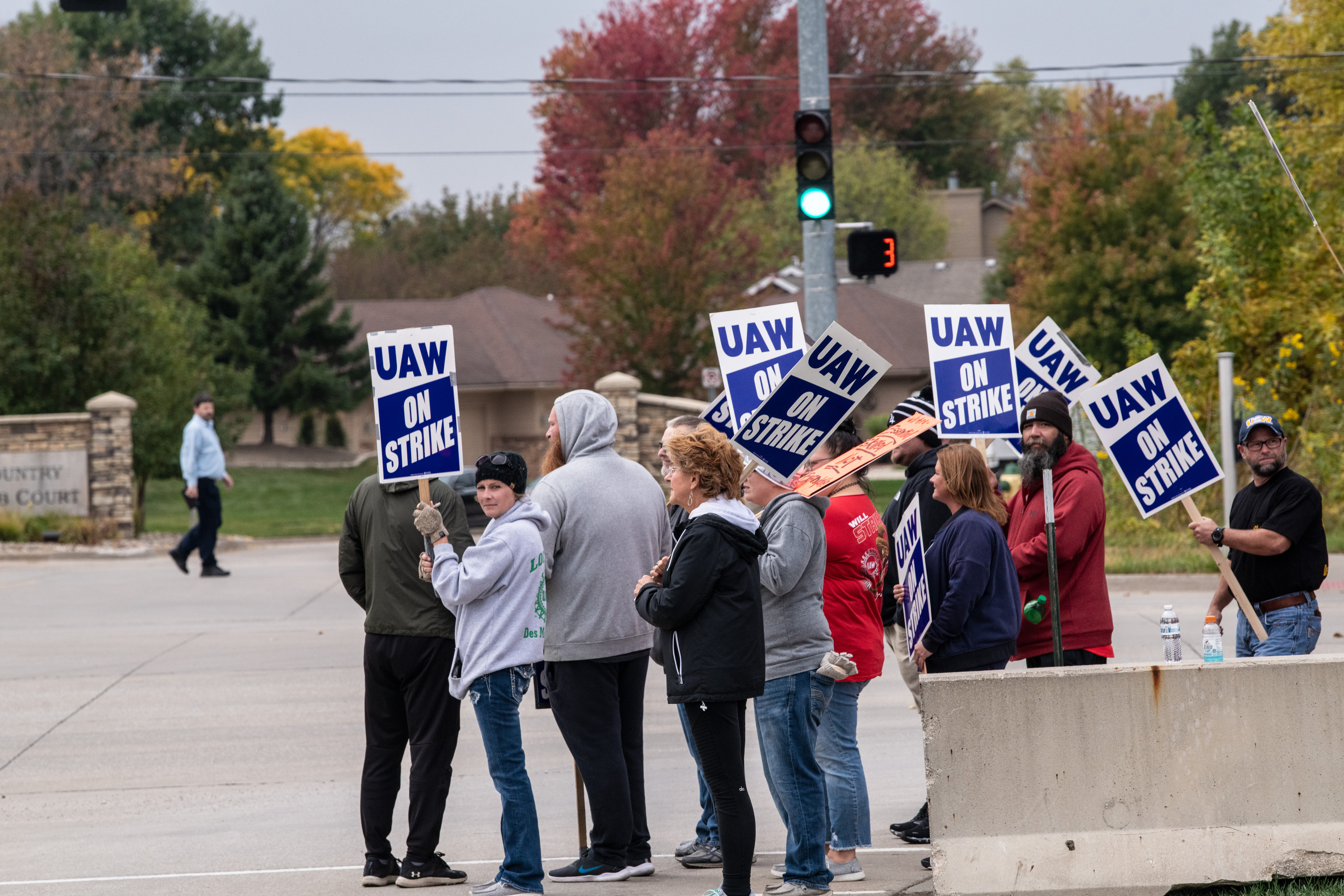
The Great Resignation has been compared to labor strike waves like Striketober. Pictured here are Iowa workers of John Deere striking as part of the United Auto Workers on October 20, 2021.

Workers in the leisure and hospital industries had relatively high quit rates. In October 2021, the U.S. Bureau of Labor Statistics reported that food service workers' quit rates rose to 6.8%, which is well above the industry average of 4.1% over the previous 20 years and still higher than the industry's quit peaks of 5% in 2006 and 2019. The retail industry had the second highest quit rates at 4.7%. From the start of the pandemic to November 2021, approximately one in five healthcare workers quit their jobs.

Amidst the Great Resignation, October 2021 saw a strike wave known as Striketober, with over 100,000 American workers participating in or preparing for strike action. While discussing Striketober, some economists described the Great Resignation as workers participating in a general strike against poor working conditions and low wages.

By August 2022, however, the U.S. workforce had surpassed its size from before the COVID-19 pandemic. Many American workers took advantage of the labor shortage to trade their current jobs for those with higher salaries, more benefits, and better schedules. Some have started or joined labor unions. A number of prospective employers are also offering paid training in order to attract recruits. Still, the recovery of employment has been uneven, as low-wage sectors—especially leisure, hospitality, retail, manufacturing, and education—lose jobs to those that offer higher income. Although retirees (who need to supplement their incomes) have returned at a rate not seen since 2019, it remains unclear whether workers aged 55 and over, people more likely to quit, will ever return. Many older workers decided to retire during the pandemic, continuing a long-term trend in the U.S. labor market of growing rates of voluntary quitting dating back to 2009. Unsatisfied with their current positions, a record number of Americans quit to start their own businesses, only to face an acute labor shortage they helped to create. In fact, small businesses are the most likely to struggle to find qualified recruits. Some 16 million Americans suffer from long COVID, and of these, 2 to 4 million are kept out of work because if it. The shortage of workers has exacerbated the disruption of the domestic supply chain of the United States.

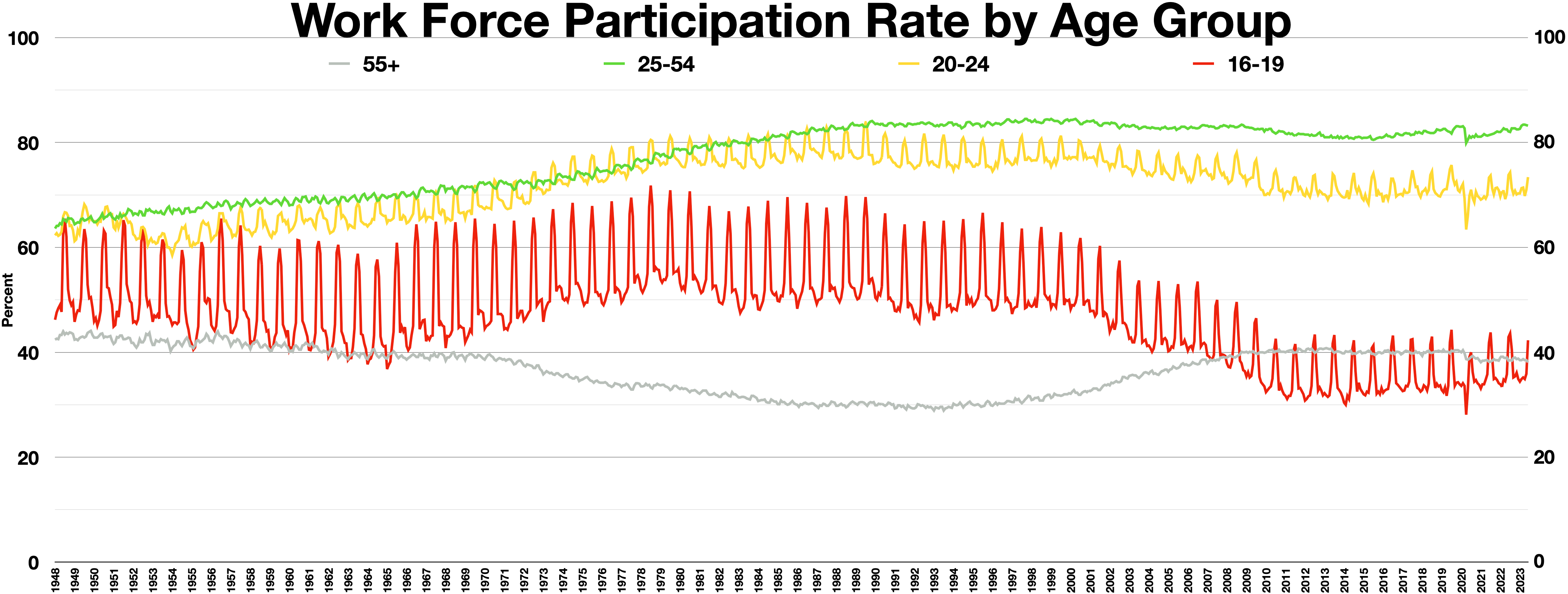
Work Force Participation Rate by Age Group 55+ 25–54 20–24 16–19

In response to the problem, a number of firms have relocated to states with lower costs of doing business (and possibly with subsidies), a large pool of skilled workers, quality education, high standards of living, and good infrastructure. Wage growth has jumped; in December 2021, wage growth reached 4.5%, the highest since June 2001. According to the International Monetary Fund (IMF), U.S. GDP per capita in 2023 will be 4.6% higher than what it was in 2019. The number of workers in positions earning less than US$29,000 has fallen noticeably compared to January 2020. Some employers in the fast food industry, like McDonald's, are providing more benefits, like college scholarships and healthcare benefits, to bring back workers. In 2023, the labor participation rate of Americans aged 15 to 64 has exceeded peak before the pandemic, already the highest since 2007. Still, although inflation remains high, many service-sector workers who got laid off during the pandemic have not returned. Public sector jobs have had higher worker retention as compared to private sector jobs, largely due to stronger benefits like paid family leave. However, some Americans have regretted leaving their old jobs as they are unsatisfied with their new positions, especially Generation Z, while businesses are not always keen to re-hire those who have quit, questioning their motives and loyalty.

According to the US Bureau of Labor Statistics, economic productivity dropped 4.1% in 2021, the sharpest slope since 1948. 20 million American workers were laid off within the first weeks of the lock down, a blow to the moral for those still employed. In order to counter the effects of a labor shortage, many American companies, especially those in the automotive, restaurant, and food delivery industries, have opted to invest more in automation. The robotics industry is booming as a result. In the entertainment industry, artificial intelligence is becoming an increasingly popular tool for reducing labor and cutting costs.

The early 2020s also saw faculty members are leaving academia for good, especially those from the humanities. In the life sciences, many postdoctoral fellows have left academia for industry, which offers better salaries. (Also see the higher education bubble in the United States and elite overproduction.)

By March 2023, the Great Resignation showed signs of petering out with fewer people quitting their positions as the job market became more competitive. Employers no longer needed to offer as many benefits in order to fill vacancies. Wage growth has slowed. The retail and hospitality industries saw quit rates returning to pre-pandemic levels. Many workers were actually working two jobs in order to make ends meet or because they are anxious about the state of the economy. Although unemployment remains under four percent and job growth continues to be positive, fears of a possible recession and improved working conditions have prompted many employees to stay where they are, leading to a drop in the monthly rate of quitting. By July 2023, there were signs that of significant expansion of the U.S. labor force thanks to women of prime working age, disabled people, and immigrants (both legal and illegal) seeking employment. Economist Anthony Klotz indicated in February 2023 that the quit rate has fallen as if the pandemic never happened. However, he noted that the health care, retail, transportation and industries were still facing a labor shortage, and that 2019 still saw a historically high rate of quitting. Nevertheless, by the end of 2023, the balance of power in the job market has shifted in favor of employers as hiring cooled and fewer vacancies were available. As 2024 began, layoffs picked up pace, though not to the level that would pose problems for the economy at large. Demand for labor remained strong as the U.S. economy continued to see net job gains.

Economist Adam Posen of the Peterson Institute for International Economics argued that the silver lining of the COVID-19 pandemic was that it had enabled low-income workers to move towards higher-paying jobs, with dividends for the U.S. economy in terms of workforce participation, wage growth, and productivity, a trend not seen in other G7 nations.

Another consequence of the Great Resignation and the growth of remote working was an oversupply of office spaces, to which developers responded by demolition or conversion to residential units, especially in places with critical housing shortages.

Following the upheaval of the great resignation, a number of neologisms were coined to better highlight employment practices including: bare minimum Monday, quiet firing, quiet hiring, quiet quitting, quiet thriving, loud quitting, live quitting, lazy girl job, personality hire, and resenteeism. The Big Stay followed the great resignation in which employers experienced reduced turnover due to a competitive labor market.

Many women in the United States have left their full-time or permanent jobs, according to The New York Times, as part of the broader phenomenon known as the "Great Resignation." Economist Kathryn Anne Edwards notes that the gender pay gap has continued to widen, pointing out that men still earn more than women across all racial and educational groups. This underscores the persistent structural inequalities that have contributed to driving women out of the workforce.

=== In other countries ===
==== Australia ====
In February 2022, Australian treasurer Josh Frydenberg reported that the labor market had been experiencing a "Great Reshuffle" rather than a "Great Resignation". He also reported that over one million workers started new jobs in the three months prior to November 2021, an increase of almost 10% prior to the pre-pandemic average. In the three months prior to February 2022, 300,000 workers reported resigning for better job opportunities, a record number. A main incentive may have been higher pay, as the typical Australian worker who switched jobs received a pay bump of 8% to 10%.

==== China ====
A similar social protest movement is occurring in China, referred to as tang ping (Chinese: 躺平; lit. 'lying flat'). It started roughly during the same time as the Great Resignation, in April 2021. It is a rejection of societal pressures to overwork, such as in the 996 working hour system. Those who participate in tang ping instead choose to "lie down flat and get over the beatings" via a low-desire, more indifferent attitude towards life. Business magazine ABC Money claimed the lifestyle resonated with youth disillusioned by the government-endorsed "Chinese Dream", which encourages a life of hard work and sacrifice without life satisfaction to show for it. The Chinese Communist Party (CCP) has worked to reject the idea through state-owned media and internet censorship, though some party voices offer that the movement provides an opportunity to reflect on how best to cultivate diligence in young generations.

==== Europe ====
A survey by HR company SD Worx of 5,000 people in Belgium, France, the U.K., Germany, and the Netherlands, found that employees in Germany had the most COVID-19-related resignations, with 6.0% of the workers leaving their jobs. This was followed by the United Kingdom with 4.7%, the Netherlands with 2.9%, and France with 2.3%. Belgium had the fewest resignations with 1.9%.

Some preliminary data show an increase in the number of quits in Italy, starting in the second quarter of 2021. The registered increase was not only in absolute terms, but also in terms of quit rate (computed as quits over employed population) and of quit share (computed as quits over total contract terminations).

In the United Kingdom between July and September 2021, over 400,000 workers left their jobs, up from 270,000 two years prior. There were a record high 1.3 million job vacancies in December 2021, or 4.4 vacancies for every 100 jobs. The U.K. workforce got smaller in 2020, the first time in over twenty years, largely due to older people retiring according to Tony Wilson, director of the Institute for Employment Studies. Between October and December 2021, the rate of U.K. workers aged 16 to 64 moving job-to-job was at an all-time high of 3.2%. Workers in their 30s (Millennials) are the most likely to quit their jobs, followed by those in their 20s (Generation Z). However, by August 2022, many British workers have returned to their previous positions after quitting and some elderly Britons have opted out of retirement in order to pay their bills in the wake of high inflation.

Some industries, like nursing, have been hit especially hard by burnout. In October 2021, before the Omicron variant caused a new wave of cases, the Royal College of Nursing conducted a survey of over 9,000 British nursing staff in which 57% of respondents were either thinking about leaving or actively planning to leave their jobs. The primary factors reported were feeling undervalued, exhausted, and not being able to give adequate care.

==== India ====
India has witnessed large scale resignations in the information technology sector, with over a million resignations in 2021.

== In popular culture ==
Fans and media outlets drew connections between the Great Resignation and Beyoncé's 2022 song "Break My Soul", specifically in the verse "Now I just fell in love / And I just quit my job".

The South Park episode "DikinBaus Hot Dogs" features a plot in which businesses are able to hire children due to the labor shortage caused by the Great Resignation.

== See also ==
- 2021–2023 global supply chain crisis
- 2021–2023 inflation surge
- 2023 Writers Guild of America strike
- 2023 United Auto Workers strike
- American Rescue Plan Act of 2021
- COVID-19 recession
- Great Reset
- Labor history of the United States
- Quiet quitting
- Ghost job
