= Jobless employed =

Term for employees given very little work

In human resources, jobless employed is an oxymoron that refers to employees who have little to no work while remaining employed. The presence of jobless employed can negatively impact work culture and breed resentment among those who are overworked. Such positions are seen as a rejection of corporate work culture and an embrace of work-life balance and anti-work.

The transition to remote work following the COVID-19 pandemic, coupled with increased automation, outsourcing, and organizational disruption have increased the prevalence of the jobless employed. Absenteeism, a lack of middle management and disengaged managers enables the issue.

Jobless employed may be uncovered through performance audits and business process reviews, and replaced through the use of artificial intelligence driven business process automation.

The term was coined by Emily Stewart in May 2023 in a Vox article.

== See also ==
- Bullshit jobs
- Quiet quitting
- Lazy girl job
