= BMM =

BMM may refer to:

- Bachelor in Mass Media, a college degree
- Bandhua Mukti Morcha, an Indian non-governmental organization
- Baptist Mid-Missions, a Baptist mission agency
- Bare minimum Monday, work ethic
- Beneficial Microbes Museum and Tourism Factory, a museum in Yilan County, Taiwan
- Biker Mice from Mars, American animated television series
- Biomimetic materials
- Birmingham, Michigan (Amtrak station), United States Amtrak station code
- Böhmisch-Mährische Maschinenfabrik AG (BMM) successor company to ČKD (Českomoravská Kolben-Daněk)
- Brigade Mixte Mobile, a Cameroonian paramilitary secret police
- Business Motivation Model
- Grand National Assembly (Turkish: Büyük Millet Meclisi)
