= Lazy girl job =

Slang term for an easy but highly paid job

A lazy girl job is an easy, usually white-collar, job with good pay where an employee can quiet quit. The term was coined in 2023 by Gabrielle Judge, also known by screen name "antiworkgirlboss" on Instagram, in response to hustle culture, the Great Resignation, and worker exploitation. Although the trend is centered around women, she argued men can have lazy girl jobs too. Judge explained the term was a marketing gimmick in order to raise awareness about "toxic workplace expectations" and is not about celebrating laziness.

== Background ==
The term "lazy girl jobs" was a product of COVID-19 pandemic-era developments in antiwork philosophies. Phrases and terms commonly used by proponents of lazy girl jobs, such as "act your wage" and "burnout" soared in popularity during the later stages of the pandemic. Similar to the "I don't dream of labor" movement, lazy girl job advocates emphasize separating work from personal life. The trend still encourages workplace participation, as opposed to staying at home, which also grew in popularity during late 2022.

== Reception ==
Reactions to the phrase have been mixed, with critics arguing that "lazy" employees may be replaced with AI, that Gen Z workers were not raised for "adulthood's challenges," and that advocates have "defeatist attitudes."

Supporters of the movement argue that "lazy girl jobs" encourage work-life balance, acting your wage, avoiding burnout, and earning more money through nontraditional means, such as overemployment.

== See also ==
- FIRE movement – Movement whose goal is financial independence and retiring early
- Tang ping – Chinese neologism, "lying flat"
- TikTok activism – Use of the internet to facilitate activism
