= Quiet cutting =

Quiet cutting is a strategy from employers where employees are reassigned to a different role rather than being laid off. The term arose in 2023 to describe a phenomenon seen in the American labor market. Although the nation had a strong job market during this time, quiet cutting was being adopted by companies due to economic worries of the future. Companies were observed to use this approach to fulfill crucial roles while simultaneously reducing costs. According to the financial research platform AlphaSense, conversations about reassignments during corporate earnings calls more than tripled between August 2022 and August 2023. Although the term "quiet quitting" was invented in 2023, the strategy had been seen before.

The term "quiet cutting" alludes to the term "quiet quitting" that was observed in the few years prior where employees would do minimal effort to meet expectations. Where quiet quitting reflected that the balance of workplace power was more favorable for employees, the rise in quiet cutting suggests that the balance may be shifting in favor of employers. The Great Resignation showed a strong demand for workers, job openings and wage growth decreased in 2023. Quiet quitting can be considered a subset of "quiet firing".

Employees may experience a range of emotions, from relief at retaining their jobs to fear of the uncertainty of their career paths following reassignments. It may potentially have a negative impact on morale and employee retention. The practice of reassignment often involves a waiting game, subtly encouraging employees to voluntarily leave to avoid costly severance packages. Workers may sometimes be deliberately placed in ill-fitting roles, prompting them to resign. The roles may be less prestigious, lower paying, and more demanding. Indicators such as reduced pay or unwanted relocation may suggest such underlying motives. Experts recommend that employees seek clarity from management regarding the specifics behind their reassignments to gain a better understanding of their career trajectory. Transparency on the part of the employer is a key factor in maintaining a respectable relationship with employees. In situations involving reassignment, legal options for employees are limited, except in cases of retaliatory or discriminatory treatment. It may be more practical and effective for the employer to directly terminate the employee rather than engaging in quiet cutting.

Between 2022 and 2023, large corporations like Adidas, Adobe, IBM and Salesforce have restructured their workforce.
