= Retail apocalypse =

Widespread decline in physical retail stores

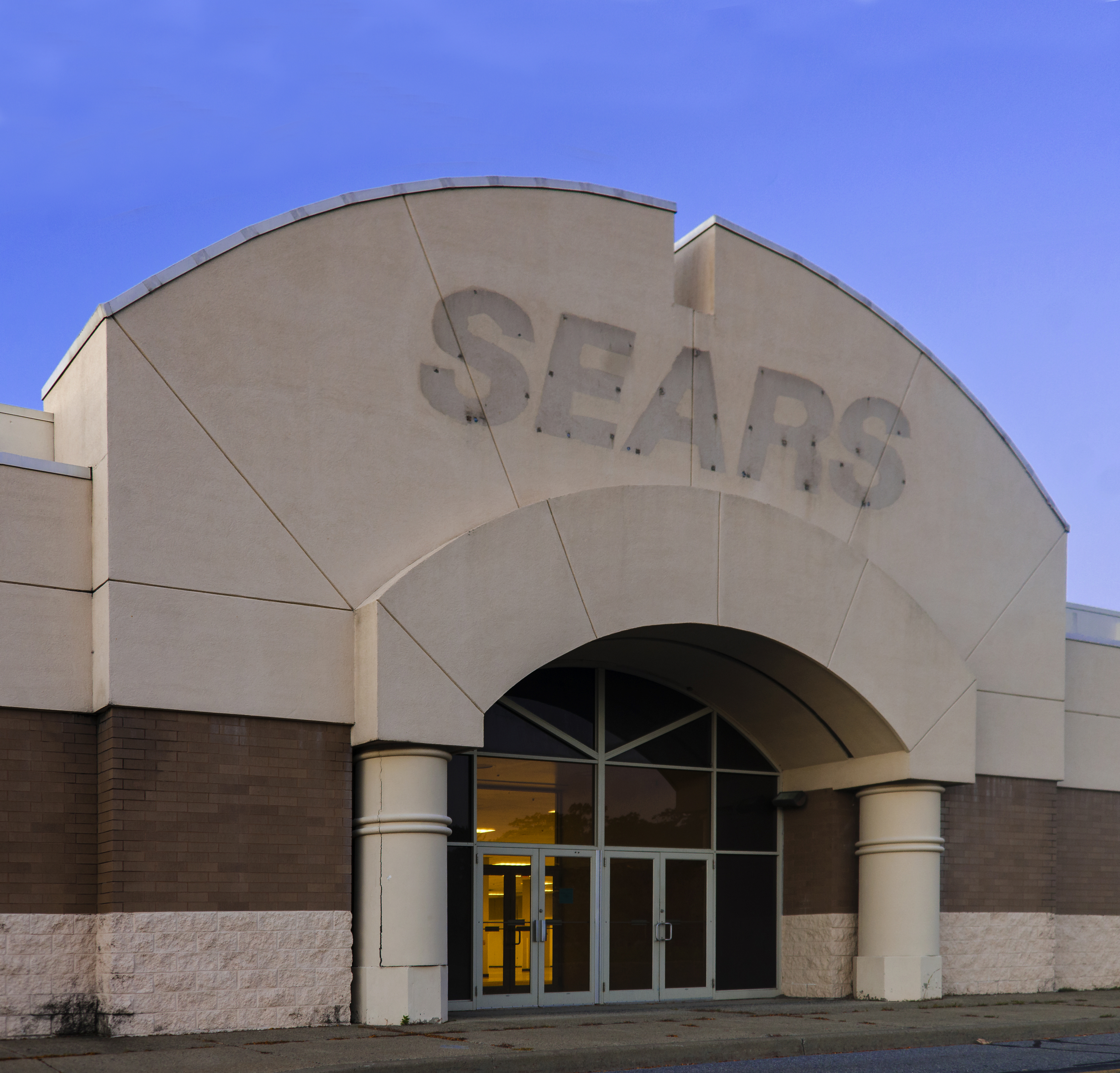
- Entrance to a former Sears store at Hudson Valley Mall in Ulster, New York, closed in 2018. It had been the mall's last anchor store.
- Date: 2010 – present
- Venue: Shopping malls, physical retail
- Location: Northern America
- Cause: Downsizing of retail chains caused by rise in global e-commerce operations related to the 2008 financial crisis; Accumulation of corporate debt for retail overexpansion; Changes in spending habits; Impact of COVID-19 pandemic; 2021–2023 inflation surge; Rise of e-commerce itself
- Outcome: Numerous bankruptcies ensued from the early 2010s; Major decline in revenue from suppliers; Increase in the amount of dead malls; Bankruptcies accelerated from March 2020 as a result of the COVID-19 recession and Inflation

The retail apocalypse (also known as retailpocalypse) is the closing of numerous Northern American brick and mortar retail stores, especially those of large chains, starting in the 2010s. The 2020s saw more store closures as a result of COVID-19 lockdowns with customers using online shopping as an alternative way to shop.

In 2017 alone, more than 12,000 physical stores closed. The reasons included debt and bankruptcy in the face of rising costs, leveraged buyouts, low quarterly profits outside holiday binge spending, delayed effects of the Great Recession, and changes in spending habits. American consumers have shifted their purchasing habits due to various factors, including experience spending versus material goods and homes, casual fashion in relaxed dress codes, as well as the rise of e-commerce and particularly juggernaut companies such as Amazon.com, Target, and Walmart. A 2017 Business Insider report dubbed this phenomenon the "Amazon effect" and calculated that Amazon.com was generating more than half of retail-sales growth.

Not everyone agrees that a "retail apocalypse" exists. Dissenting economists and experts asserted that recent retail closures are a market correction, suggesting that the phrase is misleading and instills insecurity in the 16 million U.S. retail workers. Research published by global retail analyst IHL Group in 2019 suggests that the so-called retail apocalypse narrative was an exaggeration, with "more chains that are expanding their number of stores than closing stores." That year, retailers in the United States announced 9,302 store closings, a 59% jump from 2018, and the highest number since tracking the data began in 2012.

Corporate bankruptcies and store closings increased in 2020. During the COVID-19 pandemic, most retail stores, especially struggling mall-based retailers, closed for extended periods. Several large retail companies filed for bankruptcy during the pandemic, including J. Crew, Century 21, Neiman Marcus, Lord & Taylor, Nordstrom, Macy's, Stage Stores, Stein Mart, JCPenney, Tuesday Morning, and Pier 1 Imports.

The most productive retailers in North America during the retail apocalypse are discount superstores Walmart and Target, low-cost "fast-fashion" brands (Zara, H&M), dollar stores (Dollar General, Dollar Tree, Family Dollar, Dollarama), and warehouse clubs (Costco, Sam's Club, and BJ's Wholesale Club).

A major consequence of the retail apocalypse has been the increase in vacant retail space, such as big-box stores, strip malls and shopping malls—with the latter becoming dead malls due to declining consumer traffic and store closures. Such vacant real estate, in turn, has become the site for pop-up retail stores—a notable example being Spirit Halloween, a seasonal retailer which sells Halloween merchandise and has set up stores at vacant retail buildings, including former big-box stores.

== History ==
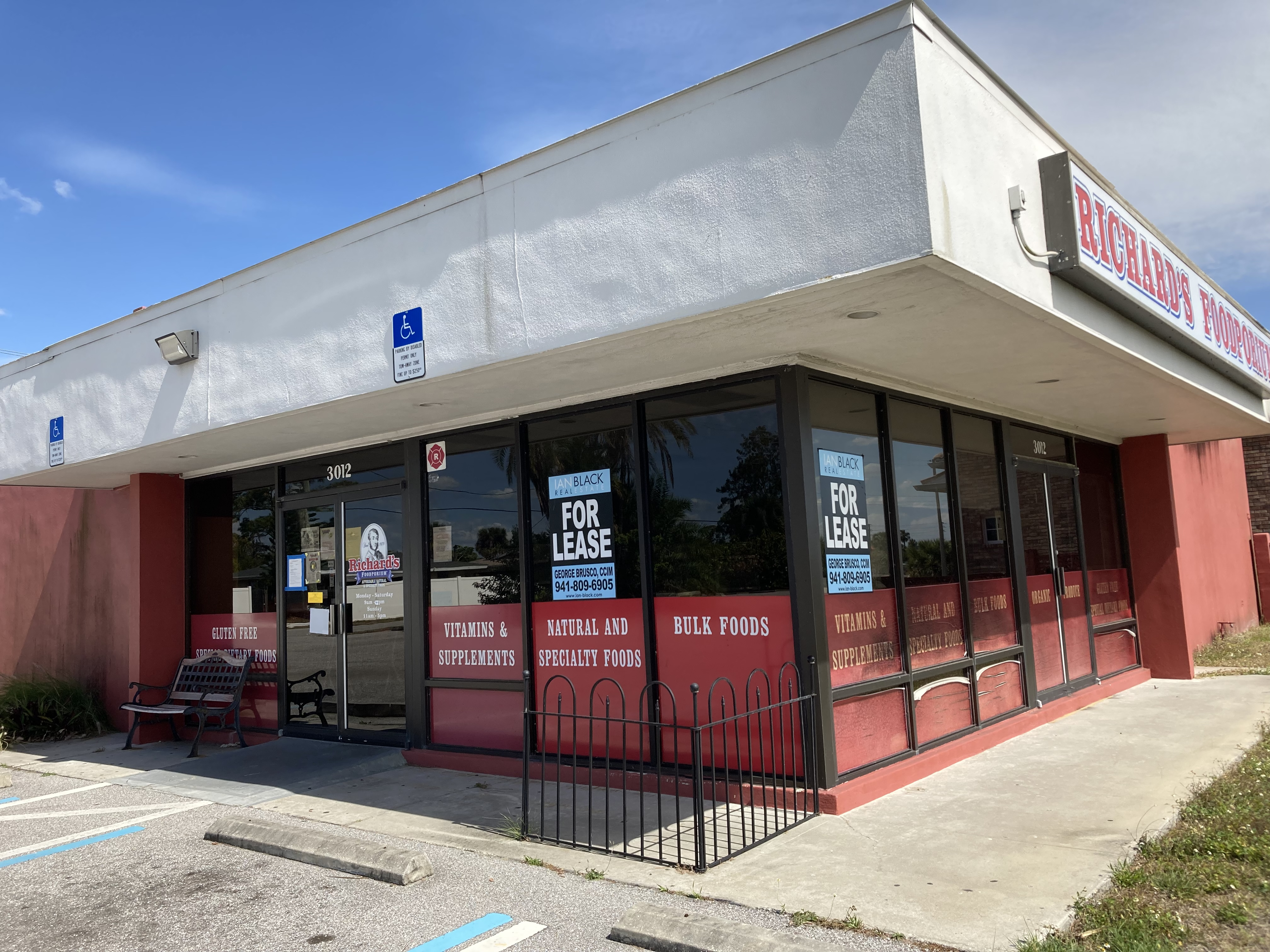
A permanently closed mom and pop health food store in Port Charlotte, Florida

The phrase "retail apocalypse" first appeared in print in an early 1990s essay by Peter Glen, author of It's Not My Department! Media appropriated the term to refer to multiple brick-and-mortar store closures resulting from shifts in consumer spending.

Since at least the 2008 financial crisis, various economic factors have resulted in the closing of many stores in North America, the United Kingdom, and Australia, particularly in the department store industry. For example, Sears Holdings had more than 3,500 stores and 355,000 employees in 2006. By the end of 2016, Sears operated 1,430 stores. In October 2018, Sears filed for bankruptcy and announced it would close an additional 142 of its 687 stores. At the time of filing, Sears had 68,000 employees.

The phrase "retail apocalypse" began gaining widespread usage in 2017 following multiple announcements from many major retailers of plans to either discontinue or greatly scale back a retail presence, including companies such as H.H. Gregg, Family Christian Stores and The Limited all going out of business entirely. The Atlantic described the phenomenon as "The Great Retail Apocalypse of 2017", reporting nine retail bankruptcies and several apparel companies having their stock hit new lows, including that of Lululemon, Urban Outfitters, and American Eagle. Credit Suisse, a major global financial services company, predicted that 25% of U.S. malls remaining in 2017 could close by 2022.

Since 2017, the phrase has been frequently applied to brick-and-mortar closures in retail, with the retail apocalypse creating a domino effect on manufacturers and suppliers; Hasbro, for example, cited the loss of the Toys "R" Us chain as a major cause for lost revenue and layoffs the company imposed in October 2018.

A 2019 analysis conducted by IHL Group, an international research and advisory firm, found that when a retailer closes many stores, it indicates more about the individual retailer rather than the retail industry overall. In 2019, the 20 stores announcing the most closures represent 75% of all closures. IHL found that for each retailer closing stores in 2019, more than five retail chains are opening stores, an increase from the 3.7 ratio of 2018. IHL also reported that the number of chains adding stores in 2019 had increased 56%, while the number of closing stores decreased by 66% in the last year.

As of May 2020, bankruptcies and store closings were expected to intensify due to widespread business closures and the resulting financial impact of the COVID-19 pandemic. J. Crew, Century 21, Neiman Marcus, Stage Stores, Stein Mart, Lord & Taylor, JCPenney, Tuesday Morning, and Pier 1 Imports were among the first major retailers to file for bankruptcy during the COVID-19 pandemic.

== Factors ==
=== Shift to e-commerce ===
The main factor cited in the closing of retail stores in the retail apocalypse is the shift in consumer habits towards online shopping. Holiday sales for e-commerce increased by an estimated 11% to 20% from 2015 to 2016. The same year, brick-and-mortar stores saw an overall increase of only 1.6%, with physical department stores experiencing a 4.8% decline.

=== Oversupply of shopping malls ===
Another factor is an over-supply of malls as the growth rate of malls in North America between 1970 and 2015 was over twice the growth rate of the population. In 2004, Malcolm Gladwell wrote that investment in malls was artificially accelerated when the United States Congress introduced accelerated depreciation into the tax code in 1954. Despite the construction of new malls, mall visits declined by 50% between 2010 and 2013 with further declines reported in each successive year.

=== Experience economy ===
One idea presented in the 2010s for the supposed retail decline was a perceived ongoing "restaurant renaissance"— a shift in consumer spending habits for their disposable income from material purchases such as clothing towards dining out and travel.

=== Shrinking middle class ===
Another cited factor is the "death of the American middle class" represented by declining real wages and rising costs creating a middle-class squeeze, resulting in large-scale closures of retailers such as Macy's, JCPenney, and Sears which traditionally relied on spending from this market segment. Particularly in rural areas, variety stores such as Dollar General, Dollar Tree, and Family Dollar, once thought to be unaffected by the apocalypse since they have continued growing rapidly, are now perceived as being at best a symptom of the phenomenon, and at worst a direct cause of rural, independent retailers collapsing, unable to compete with the lower margins that national chains can sustain.

=== Poor management ===
Poor retail management coupled with an overcritical eye towards quarterly dividends cause a lack of accurate inventory control, so the sales floor suffers from underperforming merchandise and out-of-stock merchandise, creating a poor shopping experience for customers. The focus on short-term balance sheets induces management to understaff retail stores to keep profits high. Furthermore, many long-standing chain retailers are overloaded with debt, often from leveraged buyouts from private equity firms, which hinders the profitable operation of retail chains.

=== COVID-19 pandemic ===
The COVID-19 pandemic exacerbated many issues affecting retailers, as many were forced to shut down due to non-pharmaceutical interventions that were issued in an effort to mitigate the pandemic.

At the same time, online shopping boomed during the coronavirus-related lockdown, even though it came back down starting in 2022. Most of the major e-commerce retailers in the United States were classified as essential businesses and were not required to shut down. Buyers stated that they would deliberately buy products from such categories as food and drinks, hygiene, household cleaning, clothing, health, and consumer electronics online rather than in person due to COVID-19. The outbreak is said to have changed shopping behavior permanently: in the US, 29% of surveyed consumers stated that they had no intention to ever go back to offline shopping. In the UK, this number reached 43%.

In June 2020, retail research firm Coresight reported that they estimated that the number of store closures due to the pandemic and ensuing recession would exceed the 2019 record of 9,302.

Coresight Research data later indicated that store closures had reduced by 49% from 2020 to 2021, with store openings increased by 36% over the previous year. Clothing and accessories accounted for 43% of retail closures in 2021. In July 2022, the analytics firm published findings that store openings had exceeded store closings for the first half of 2022, and that there were 10% fewer closings and 3% fewer openings than in 2021.

== Major retail bankruptcies ==
Store closures and bankruptcy filings
Company name	Time period	Number of stores closed	Bankruptcy	Open stores	Ref.
Borders Books	2011	Closed all stores	Liquidated	None	
The Bon-Ton	2018	Remaining 267 locations liquidated	Filed February 2018	None; last store closed October 2020	
Sears Holdings	2013–2021	1,380 Kmart and Sears stores	Filed October 2018; Acquired out February 2019	5 (2026)	
J. C. Penney	2015–2020	177	Filed May 2020	641 (2026)	
Toys "R" Us	2018	Closed all US, UK, and Australia stores	Filed 2017; Re-emerged 2019	80 Canada stores, 160 Japan stores, 1 US Flagship store, 400+ stores within Macy's	
J. Crew	2018–2020	54	Filed May 2020	492	
Barneys New York	2019	15	Filed 2019, liquidated	None	
Forever 21	2019 & 2025	200 (approx.); Remaining 350 US stores	Filed September 2019; Filed March 2025	190	
A.C. Moore	2019–2020	145	Filed September 2019	Became Michaels	
Payless ShoeSource	2019–2020	2,500 – all stores in North America and Puerto Rico (2019)	Filed February 2019; Emerged January 2020 (second bankruptcy)	700 (Latin and Central America, Caribbean, Southeast Asia, Middle East and India)	
Pier 1 Imports	2020	Remaining 942 stores	Filed February 2020	None	
Neiman Marcus	2020	6	Filed May 2020	37	
Tuesday Morning	2020 & 2023	196	Filed May 2020; emerged December 2020 Filed February 2023; announced liquidations in April	None (Remaining stores liquidated by July 2023)	
GNC	2020	2450 (approx.)	Filed June 2020	4,850 (approx.)	
True Religion	2017 & 2020	37	Filed July 2017; April – Nov. 2020	49 (2020)	
Brooks Brothers	2020	253	Filed July 2020	171	
Bed Bath & Beyond	2023	360	Filed April 2023	None (all US & Canada stores liquidated by July 2023)	
Express, Inc.	2024	100	Filed April 2024		
Big Lots	2024		Filed September 2024	218 (2026)	
Party City	2023 & 2024	700 – all company-owned stores	Filed January 2023; Filed December 2024	≤150 (franchisee stores only)	
Jo-Ann	2024 & 2025	800	Filed March 2024; Filed January 2025; announced liquidations in February	None (all US stores liquidated by May 2025)	
99 Cents Only Stores	2024	371	Filed 2024	None, 170 property leases sold to Dollar Tree, 10 sold to Ollie's Bargain Outlet	
Rite Aid	2023 & 2025	1,245	Filed October 2023; Filed May 2025	None (all stores liquidated by September 2025)	
Hudson's Bay	2025	80	Filed March 2025	None (6 originally meant to remain open, but since all have closed, 28 Store leases are set to be revived under a different name.)	

== Strategies ==
Researchers say retailers' survival may be tied to customer experience and brand reputation. In 2019, Forbes said brand reputation was the biggest factor. In 2020, Monash University in Australia said the three key factors were delivering a "great in-store retail experience", customer-targeted stock offerings, and "seamless omnichannel integration".

Toys "R" Us may not have responded well to changing consumer behavior.

Some retail chains are trying robots and other technologies to reduce costs or improve customer experiences. Ikea became one of the first retailers to use Apple's ARKit to develop an augmented reality app that allowed customers to visualize 3D renderings of Ikea products as they would appear in a certain room or place. Macy's, American Eagle, Nike and Sephora were reported to be implementing various technologies to integrate digital experiences to improve consumers' physical shopping experiences. Sephora has installed virtual mirrors that use augmented reality to allow customers to try on makeup. Walmart automated some aspects of its supply chain. Kohl's reduced the size of some stores from 90,000 to between 60,000 and 35,000 square feet and uses robots to help clean and stock shelves. Lowe's has been using LowesBot to help customers find items. Company executives have said robots lower costs and improve efficiency, but employees report they don't like working with robots.

A 2018 study from the International Council of Shopping Centers indicated that opening new stores can increase traffic to retailer websites.

== See also ==
- Dead mall
- Jobpocalypse
- Direct-to-consumer
- Economic history of the United States
- Pop-up shop
