= Quiet cracking =

Workplace term for persistent disengagement without quitting

Quiet cracking is a workplace term used to describe employees who feel stuck and increasingly disengaged but remain in their jobs, often due to economic insecurity, limited alternatives, or fear of change. Commentators frame it as a quieter cousin of quiet quitting and a symptom of burnout-era disillusionment that may not immediately show up in performance metrics.

== Origin and usage ==
Trade and business media began covering the term in 2025 in the context of a cooling labor market sometimes called the "Big Stay". A widely cited 2025 survey by learning platform TalentLMS described quiet cracking as a "persistent feeling of workplace unhappiness" that erodes motivation and leads to disengagement; press coverage reported that 20% of U.S. workers experience it frequently and another 34% occasionally. Some sources attribute the coinage to TalentLMS's study; the term subsequently appeared in general-interest and HR publications discussing warning signs and managerial responses.

== Characteristics ==
Writers describe quiet cracking as internal and progressive rather than a discrete decision to withdraw effort. Reported indicators include chronic fatigue, loss of motivation, emotional distress, and reduced participation, while employees continue to meet baseline expectations. Suggested drivers include job insecurity, limited advancement, weak manager–employee communication, and fears about automation and restructuring.

== Media coverage ==
The term has been discussed in mainstream and trade publications, including explanatory and reported pieces in Business Insider, ITPro, and CFO.com, as well as HR outlets and business news aggregators. Additional commentary characterizes it as a "silent workplace crisis" and compares it unfavorably to quiet quitting because its effects may be harder for employers to spot.

== Criticism and ambiguity ==
Some coverage labels "quiet cracking" a buzzword and notes overlap with concepts such as burnout, disengagement, and job embeddedness; the novelty and boundaries of the term remain subjects of commentary. Editors have also cautioned that evidence largely comes from self-reported surveys and early media discussion rather than longitudinal research.

== See also ==
- Occupational burnout
- Employee engagement
- Job embeddedness
