= Career shock =

Concept in vocational psychology

In vocational psychology and organizational behavior, a career shock is an unexpected, disruptive event triggered by external factors that forces an individual to pause and rethink their professional path. Unlike routine workplace stress or planned job transitions, career shocks are distinct occurrences out of the employee's direct control. They are major events that can quickly change a person's career trajectory.

While the term includes negative events such as sudden layoffs, unexpected demotions, or organizational bankruptcy, career shocks can also be entirely positive. Examples of positive shocks include receiving an unsolicited job offer, an unexpected early promotion, or a sudden change in management that works in the employee's favor.

== Characteristics and mechanism ==
To qualify as a career shock, an event must have two primary features: it must originate from the environment rather than the individual's internal plans, and it must be at least partially unanticipated. For example, standard events like a planned resignation or a regular retirement are not considered career shocks. When such an event occurs, it forces the individual out of a routine "autopilot" mode and prompts careful reflection. This means the person is forced to actively reflect on their current job satisfaction, career goals, and future employability.

== Types of career shocks ==
Researchers generally divide career shocks into positive and negative categories based on their immediate impact on the employee. Negative shocks, such as a sudden firing, a severe personal illness, or a company bankruptcy, typically restrict immediate career options and increase workplace stress. Positive shocks open up unexpected paths for advancement. Examples include receiving an unplanned financial bonus, getting headhunted for a higher position out of the blue, or securing an unexpected promotion due to a supervisor's sudden departure.

== Impact on career development ==
The long-term consequences of a career shock depend heavily on an individual's resilience and career adaptability. While negative shocks often decrease short-term job satisfaction and cause anxiety, they can occasionally lead to positive outcomes by pushing employees to leave stagnant roles or toxic work environments. In contrast, positive shocks generally boost objective career success and encourage proactive career behaviors, such as aggressive networking or seeking out further education.

== The COVID-19 pandemic as a global career shock ==
The outbreak of the COVID-19 pandemic is widely cited in vocational psychology as a major example of a large-scale, collective career shock. It disrupted millions of professional paths simultaneously through sudden layoffs, the rapid shift to remote work, and radical changes in essential worker status. Academic literature notes that the pandemic forced a global reassessment of work-life balance and job security, directly contributing to massive labor market shifts such as the Great Resignation.

== See also ==
- Organizational behavior
- Career development
- Occupational stress
