= EIP =

EIP may refer to:

- Eco-industrial park
- Economic impact payment (disambiguation), a name for several different tax rebates, tax credits, or tax deductions from the U.S. government
- EIP register, in the IA-32 architecture
- Eipo language
- Electrical impedance plethysmography
- Electoral Integrity Project
- Enterprise information portal
- Enterprise Integration Patterns, a book by Gregor Hohpe and Bobby Woolf
- Environmental Integrity Project, an American non-profit
- Estonian Independence Party, a political party in Estonia
- Ethereum Improvement Proposal, a proposal to improve the quality of Ethereum cryptocurrency software
- European Institute of Peace
- Evolutionary image processing
- Express InterCity Premium
- Entrepreneurship and Innovation Programme of the European Commission's Competitiveness and Innovation Framework Programme
