= Hybrid creep =

Subtly requiring employees to return to the office

Hybrid creep is an approach taken by employers to subtly increase in-office requirements for remote workers without issuing a formal return to office (RTO) mandate. The creep happens gradually by shifting from a few in-office "anchor days" a month to de facto full-time attendance. Firms apply the carrot and stick approach through incentivizing in-office perks, tying performance and promotions to attendance, tracking badge swipes, and leveraging economic uncertainty.

Some employees have welcomed the gradual return to office, while others have not leading to employee disengagement. To counter hybrid creep, employees should request explicit, documented expectations for the number of required in-office days to ensure performance reviews reflect output rather than desk time.
