= Attitudinal analytics =

Marketing technology application

Attitudinal analytics is a marketing technology application that involves the integration of online surveys that capture visitor intent and critical demographic attributes with the tracking of explicit behavior through click stream monitoring on websites. This quantitative user experience collects data from thousands of user sessions rather than hundreds. This data is typically compared against key performance indicators for performance, customer satisfaction and overall customer experience success or failure. Reports of finding and recommendations are used to improve a website or customer experience program that is heavily dependent upon the use of an online campaigns driving traffic to a website or collection of sites. Offline measurement can also be incorporated to extend the customer experience understanding to illuminate what elements of the online experience impacted offline behavior such as purchasing in a store or visiting a branch office.

Several vendors provide attitudinal analytics solutions as stand-alone offerings. Leading web analytics players are also providing partner integration frameworks to better integrate silos of intent, attitudinal and behavioral data.
