= Career catfishing =

Workplace practice involving not showing up to first work day

Career catfishing refers to the practice of new recruits deliberately not showing up for work on their expected first day of employment, which emerged in the mid-2020s. The term is derived from catfishing, which refers to creating a fake identity or online persona with the intent of deception.

== Practice ==
The term "career catfishing" describes the practice of accepting a job offer with no intention of starting in the position, thus deliberately failing to appear for their first day of work and knowingly misleading employers during the hiring process. This practice emerged in the mid-2020s alongside other workplace trends such as "coffee badging" and "quiet quitting" that generally represent increased distrust and antagonism in employee-employer relationships.

== Prevalence ==
Research conducted by CV building platform CV Genius in 2025 indicated that approximately 34% of surveyed Generation Z workers had engaged in career catfishing. The practice showed a generational gradient, with declining prevalence among older workforce cohorts from 24% in Millennials and 11% in Generation X to only 7% among surveyed baby boomers.

Business research indicated that its prevalence among Generation Z workers served to signal their opposition to multiple interviews and long response times from their employers. It is also believed to be a reciprocal reaction to employee-hostile recruitment practices that arose during and following the COVID-19 pandemic, such as the ghosting of applicants, extensive application steps, and delays in responses from hiring managers. Such practices can also be the result of the perception by job seekers that the job obtained can easily be replaced by a better job. The increased role of artificial intelligence in hiring processes, particularly in resumé (CV) screening, may have further contributed to these behaviors by reducing human interaction in the hiring process, and potentially leading to mismatched job placements.

It was reported by the tech-education company General Assembly that no more than 12% of mid-level executives believe that fresh graduates are practically ready to enter the job market, reflecting clear challenges in qualifying young talent.

== See also ==
- Absenteeism
- Employee ghosting
- Work-to-rule
