= Performance punishment =

Burdening high-performing employees with extra work

In human resources, performance punishment also known as quiet promotion refers to the burdening of high-performing employees with additional work, often without compensation or promotion. It is related to quiet hiring, the practice of having an employee take on a new responsibilities or a role within their company due to need. The role may be temporary or permanent, and the reassignment may not align with employee interests. Quiet hiring often occurs during economic slowdowns as a cost-saving measure.

Performance punishment can lead to occupational burnout, resentment, and a sense of being undervalued leading to morale loss. The term "competence hangover" describes burnout resulting from taking on too many responsibilities at work and becoming the person everyone relies on. Performance punishment of high-performers may also limit opportunities for improvement of low-performers and alternative growth opportunities for high-performers. Performance punishment allows for performance deficits of low-performers to be ignored.

Performance punishment can be mitigated by having work fairly distributed, promoting skills development, and transparent communication.

Performance punishment and quiet hiring may negatively impact employee engagement with reassigned employees quiet quitting or mentally checking out. Quiet hiring may promote the utilization of nontraditional labor pools and allow workers to gain new skills and try out new roles for career development. Quiet hiring encourages the promotion of internal employees over external hiring.

== Covid-19 ==
The terms quiet promotion and quiet hiring arose in response to the Great Resignation following the COVID-19 pandemic in response to quiet quitting, though the practice was previously in place. Quiet promotions may be due to a staffing shortage or cost-cutting measures.
