= Loud quitting =

Type of employee disengagement

Loud quitting refers to a type of employee disengagement in which individuals openly share their discontent, desire for change, and intention to leave. These individuals may refuse to do tasks that they deem unnecessary and by sharing their contempt with colleagues, may spread their disenchantment and disengagement. Loud quitting may arise from perceived workplace inequities, subpar compensation, and an unresponsive employer.

Loud quitting arose as an alternative response to quiet quitting and hustle culture following the COVID-19 pandemic. Loud quitting is more common among younger workers who are more vocal about intolerable working conditions. Increased occupational stress has increased loud quitting.

Loud quitting is a revolt against a company's work culture and leadership, and is often made publicly on social media. Loud quitting may undermine a business's public image, while also making it more challenging for the employee to find new employment.

== Live quitting ==
One version of loud quitting is live quitting where employees live-stream their departure on TikTok under the #Quittok. By publicizing their departure, employees create accountability for both the business and themselves.

== See also ==
- Rage quit
