= Ghosting (behavior) =

Stopping all communication with a person

Ghosting is a colloquial term for the practice of suddenly ending all communication and avoiding contact with another person without any apparent warning or explanation and ignoring any subsequent attempts to communicate. With increased digital communication, ghosting is often seen as an easy escape from confrontation or emotional discomfort, facilitated by the anonymity and convenience of online platforms.

The term originated in the early 2000s, typically referring to dating and romantic relationships. In the following decade, the use of the term increased, which has been attributed to the increasing popularity of social media and online dating apps. The term has also expanded to refer to similar practices among family members, friends, employers and businesses.

A person who 'ghosts' may have limited awareness of how it will make the other person feel. Ghosting is associated with negative mental health effects on the person on the receiving end and has been described by some mental health professionals as a passive-aggressive form of emotional abuse or cruelty.

== Origin of term ==
The term is used in the context of online exchanges, and became popular by 2015 through many articles on high-profile celebrity relationship dissolutions, and went on to be widely used. It has been the subject of many articles and discussions on dating and relationships in various media. It was included in the Collins English Dictionary in 2015.

== Interpersonal relationships ==
=== Romantic relationships ===
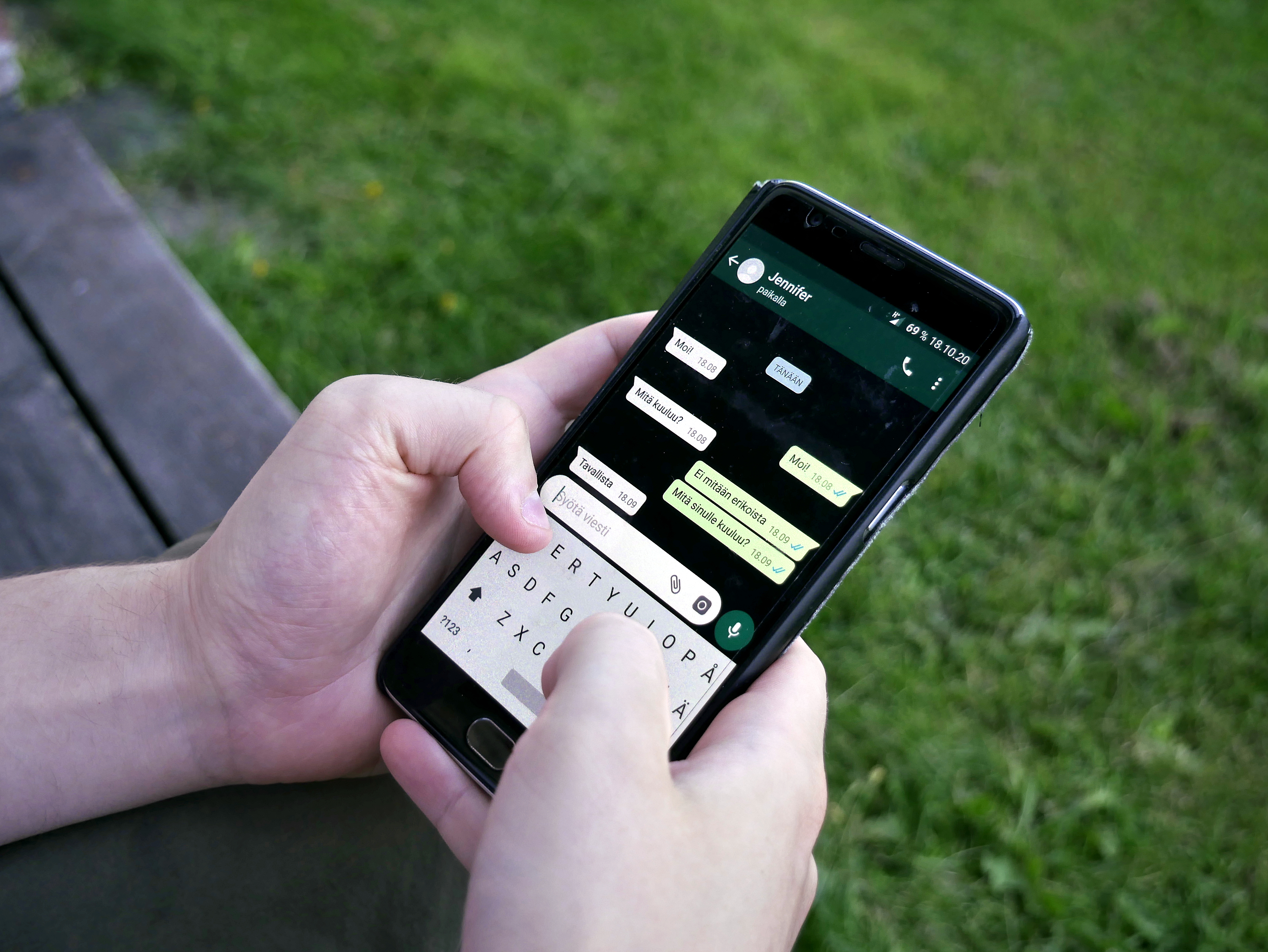
A person recreationally text messaging using WhatsApp

People primarily ghost in relationships as a way of avoiding emotional discomfort they are having in a relationship, and may not take into consideration how it will make the person they are ghosting feel. A survey from BuzzFeed indicated that 81% of people who ghosted did so because they "weren't into" the person they ghosted, 64% said the person they ghosted did something they disliked, and 25% stated they were angry with the person. Ghosting was found to be more common in non-committed casual dating and less frequent in committed relationships.

In 2014, a YouGov survey was taken to see if Americans have ever ghosted their partner to end a relationship. In that survey, 1,000 US adults were interviewed about ghosting, yielding the result that just over 10% of Americans have ghosted someone to break up with them.

A 2018 survey determined women were much more likely to ghost than men.

A 2024 survey study involving 177 participants found that ghosting was the most frequently experienced type of rejection in online dating, even after a substantial exchange of messages. Unmatching or blocking and rejection with an explanation were reported less frequently.

=== Motivations ===
A 2024 study found that ghosting, while often perceived as a lack of care, is frequently motivated by prosocial intentions, with ghosters aiming to avoid causing direct emotional pain. The study found that ghostees significantly underestimate the care ghosters have for them, highlighting a disconnect between ghosters' intentions and ghostees' perceptions. Some women were motivated by conflict avoidance to ghost.

Ghosting has become more prevalent. The more commonplace the behavior becomes, the more individuals can become desensitized to it, thus making people more likely to engage in ghosting.

Online platforms tend to exacerbate ghosting, as they create environments where people feel less accountable for their actions. When a relationship is online and there are few mutual social connections in the relationship, people are more inclined to ghost due to the lack of social consequences. Other factors which been implicated for causing ghosting include social media, dating apps, polarizing politics, and the relative anonymity and isolation in modern-day dating and hookup culture, which make it easier to sever contact with few social repercussions.

Research by Larissa Barber and Alecia Santuzzi highlights the concept of "telepressure", a form of emotional distress that occurs when someone feels compelled to respond quickly to digital messages. The longer a person waits without receiving a response, the greater the emotional strain becomes.

According to psychologist Kelsey M. Latimer, people who ghost in relationships are more likely to have personality traits and behaviors that are self-centered, avoidant, and manipulative. However, ghosting could also be a sign of self-isolation seen in people with depression, suicidal tendencies, or are relapsing with an addiction.

=== Consequences ===
There is limited research directly on the effect of ghosting on the person on the receiving end. However, studies have indicated that ghosting is considered one of the most hurtful ways to end a relationship in comparison to other methods such as direct confrontation. It has been shown to cause feelings of ostracism, exclusion, social rejection, and frustration. Additionally, the lack of social cues along with the ambiguity in ghosting can cause a form of emotional dysregulation in which a person feels out of control. Some mental health professionals consider ghosting to be a passive-aggressive form of emotional abuse, a type of silent treatment or stonewalling behavior, and emotional cruelty.

== Employment ==
=== Ghost jobs ===
In employment, ghost jobs refer to false job posting where a person who interviews for a job and is led to believe there is a chance of getting the job, then no acknowledgement that the position had been filled is ever conveyed to the interviewee.

Ghost job postings create a false sense of hope and breed distrust. Employers create ghost job postings to gauge the market and have a readily available talent pool when they are ready to hire.

=== Employee ghosting ===
Employee ghosting refers to people accepting job offers and cutting off contact with the potential employer, as well as employees leaving their jobs without any notice. This behavior reflects the broader trend of ghosting in workplace, where individuals may avoid the discomfort of confrontation or formal resignation by simply ghosting.

== Related terms and behaviors ==
While "ghosting" refers to "disappearing from a special someone's life mysteriously and without explanation", numerous similar behaviors have been identified, that include various degrees of continued connection with a target. For example, there is the sentimental and positive, but also ghost-related in origin, Marleying, which is "when an ex gets in touch with you at Christmas out of nowhere". "Cloaking" is another related behavior that occurs when an online match blocks someone on all apps while standing them up for a date. The term was coined by Mashable journalist Rachel Thompson after she was stood up for a date by a Hinge match and blocked on all apps. Ghosting, marleying and cloaking may be seen as belonging to a family of related behavior, but the exact same behavior may be explained by different causes, potentially differing significantly, especially in severity.

"Orbiting" is an English term used colloquially and its meaning is closely related to ghosting. It occurs in love and friendship relationships, in which one wants to stop having an intimate relationship. However, contact is not completely lost, since the one who "abandons" continues to show signs to the other, especially through social media. They may even interact with the abandoned one, but in a very superficial way, such as liking their posts or viewing their stories, but not replying to any direct message or taking their calls. Anna Lovine, who coined the expression, explained the trend as the following: the orbiter keeps you "close enough to see each other; far enough never to talk". The word appeared for the first time as a pre-selection for the Word of the Year 2018 in Oxford, in which orbiting is defined as "the action of abruptly withdrawing from direct communication with someone while still monitoring, and sometimes responding to, their activity on social media".

== See also ==
- Breadcrumbing – Form of manipulation
- Career catfishing – Workplace practice involving not showing up to first work day
- Cold shoulder – Phrase used to disregard someone
- Coping (psychology) – Strategies used to reduce unpleasant emotions
- Cowardice – Excess of fear
- Cry room – Secluded area for children and caregivers
- Ostracism – Democratic procedure for expelling citizens
- Shadow banning – Blocking a user from an online community without their awareness
- Social rejection – Exclusion of someone from social relations
- Stonewalling – Type of behavior in certain situations
