= Catfishing =

Deceptive online social network presence

Catfishing refers to the creation of a fictitious online persona or fake identity, (typically on social networking platforms), with the intent of deception, usually to mislead a victim into an online romantic relationship or to obtain some illegal financial gain through fraud, such as the pig butchering scam, or through sextortion. The motivation for catfishing may also be just the desire to feel more popular or to experiment with sexual preferences.

Perpetrators, usually referred to as catfish, generally use fake photos and lie about their personal lives to present themselves as more attractive for financial gain, personal satisfaction, evasion of legal consequences, or to troll. They often love bomb the victim, but refuse to have video call or talk on the phone so that they cannot be verified, their IP address does not match the city of their supposed location, refuse or repeatedly postpone meeting in person, have inconsistencies with name, pictures, or information appearing on their profiles, or request money while isolating victims from real-life social circles by insisting the relationship remain a secret. Public awareness surrounding catfishing has increased in recent years, partially attributed to an increase in the occurrence of the practice combined with a number of high-profile instances.

== Etymology ==
The term was introduced with the release of the 2010 American documentary film Catfish, following executive producer Nev Schulman, himself a victim of catfishing. Schulman had developed an online friendship with a 40-year-old housewife mainly presenting herself as an 18-year-old girl from the Midwestern United States. In the documentary, the woman's husband compares her behavior to that of a catfish being shipped with live cod.

This urban legend originated from Essays in Rebellion (1913) by Henry Nevinson and The Catfish (1913) by Charles Marriott and refers to the practice of placing a catfish in a tank full of cod for the purposes of shipping. The impostor, or catfish, is said to prevent the cod from becoming pale and lethargic, ensuring the delivery of a high-quality product. Catfish: The TV Show, airing on MTV since 2012, follows Schulman as he helps others investigate possible catfish situations.

The term spiked in popularity in 2013 after University of Notre Dame football star Manti Te'o was publicly catfished. The 2013 court case Zimmerman v. Board of Trustees of Ball State University saw the first legal use of the term catfishing, with the judge using the Urban Dictionary definition.

Catfish was added to the eleventh edition of the Merriam-Webster Collegiate Dictionary in 2014. An associate editor at Merriam-Webster noted that the word was "such a sensation from the moment that it came on the scene," attributing its popularity to both Schulman's documentary and the Manti Te'o story.

== Practice and sociology ==
Catfishing is often employed on dating websites, social media, and email by perpetrators to disassociate from their real-life identities and shield themselves from moral obligations or responsibilities. Motivations for catfishing are typically malevolent and may include sexual, financial, or social gain. The practice is often attributed to the online disinhibition effect. Typically, the catfish uses someone else's photos and personal details to make themselves appear genuine, while the individual whose identity is being exploited is unaware that their information is being used.

In certain cases, catfishing is used as a means for individuals to explore and express their gender and sexual identity, particularly in online environments conducive to anonymity. Commonly, perpetrators will portray themselves as the opposite gender on social media and dating apps to interact with unsuspecting individuals.

Perpetrators of catfishing are often seeking financial gain. In 2015, three girls managed to steal $3,300 from the Islamic State after being approached by a recruitment officer to join the terrorist organization. After receiving money for supposed travel to Syria, the girls deleted their account and kept the money for personal travel.

Catfishing has also been used as a tactic to stop criminal activity. In 2004, Dateline NBC produced the segment To Catch a Predator, documenting undercover officers using fake online profiles to lure potential sexual predators into spaces where meetings with supposed minors had been arranged.

Catfishing can also be used as a tactic to cyberbully, troll, or attack individuals online while working under a false identity, making the harassment difficult to trace.

== Signs ==
While catfishing can take many forms, some common behaviors and characteristics have been defined:

- Refusal to video chat or talk on the phone.
- When using peer-to-peer chat or video chat, their IP address does not match the city or state of their supposed location.
- Refuses or repeatedly postpones meeting in person, often at the last minute with increasingly elaborate, contradictory, or impossible excuses (e.g. attending a concert that doesn't exist, or are quarantined with a non contagious disease).
- Follow requests and/or messages from unknown persons, sometimes impersonating a celebrity, often marked by low follower count and lack of account verification.
- Inconsistencies with names, pictures, or information appearing on profiles that ostensibly belong to the same individual.
- Photo backgrounds are inconsistent with their supposed locations.
- Love bombing.
- Requesting money, usually justified with a backstory and/or promise of repayment.
- Isolation of victim from real-life social circles and/or insisting the relationship remain a secret.

== Dangers ==
Catfishing can lead to serious potential dangers. In some cases, catfish have lured victims into threatening in-person meetings, such as in the 2002 murder of Kacie Woody and the 2007 murder of Carly Ryan. Sexual predators utilize catfishing to gain the trust of minors and/or other vulnerable people to acquire sensitive information and illicit photographs. Catfishing has also been linked to a number of suicides, such as the 2006 suicide of Megan Meier.

== Chatfishing ==
Chatfishing is the use of synthetic texts, often output from generative AI, to drive interaction online, especially on dating apps.

== Kittenfishing ==
The term "kittenfishing" refers to exaggerating or telling small lies on dating apps or while dating. An example is claiming to have graduated from a university where one took only one or a few courses, another example is using old photos. Dating coach and author Damona Hoffman makes the claim that this is something most people do on social media. She says that for dating, people should try to be honest.

== See also ==
- Romance scam – Confidence trick using romantic intentions
- Career catfishing – Workplace practice involving not showing up to first work day
- Gaslighting – Type of psychological manipulation
- Honey trapping – Investigative practice using romantic or sexual relationships
- Phishing – Form of social engineering
- Sadfishing – Seeking sympathy by exaggerating emotional problems
- Sock puppet account – False online identity used for deception
- Trojan horse (computing) – Type of malware
- Twinking – Disapproved behavior in role-playing games
