= Bare minimum Monday =

Employee initiative to do minimal work on Monday

Bare minimum Monday (BMM), also known as minimum effort Monday or minimal Mondays, is an initiative by employees to do the minimal amount of work necessary on Mondays, which mark the start of the work week. This may also involve starting the work day later and prioritizing self-care activities. In doing so, employees alleviate the stress and anxiety associated with the beginning of the work week by making Mondays more manageable and less overwhelming.

The term was coined in 2022 by Marisa Jo Mayes on TikTok under the username "itsmarisajo" in response to occupational burnout from the Sunday scaries, hustle culture, and worker exploitation.

Bare minimum Monday has been criticized as an antiwork effort and it has been said that employee disengagement could lead to termination of employment. Bare minimum Monday is not compatible with company cultures that promote presenteeism.

It is more prevalent among Generation Y and Z employees and is considered a form of quiet quitting.

== See also ==
- Saint Monday
