= Brigade Mixte Mobile =

Cameroonian paramilitary secret police

The Brigade Mixte Mobile (BMM) is the paramilitary secret police of Cameroon. Headquarters are in N'Kondengue, near the capital of Yaoundé.

The brigade operates a number of prisons for political prisoners in the country.
