= Personality hire =

Recruitment practice

In recruitment, a personality hire refers to the practice of hiring candidates for their personality, rather than their tangible skill set. Personality hires are individuals who are expected to be fun and outgoing, similar to that of extroverts. A personality hire may not be the most qualified candidate in terms of skills or experience, but rather the one most suitable based on having desired personality traits. Personality hires typically have stronger soft skills than hard skills, may serve as a morale booster within the workplace, and help build corporate culture. Some candidates may label themselves as personality hires due to imposter syndrome. The term came into mainstream use in 2023 and is similar to that of a diversity hire.

A personality hire may be reflective of an implicit cognitive affinity bias. Personality hires have been criticized for their lack of skills and competency.

Due to their sociable personalities, personality hires may have to set personal boundaries.

== Analysis ==
=== Rationale behind personality-based hiring ===
Personality-based hiring results from the belief that interpersonal traits significantly contribute to team effectiveness, workplace harmony, and organizational performance. Some employers prioritize candidates who exhibit traits such as agreeableness or extraversion, because they assume that these qualities increase collaboration and communication in the workplace. This is usually in an attempt to boost company culture, which is found to be significant in roles that involve client interaction. Some hiring managers may view personality more important than technical qualifications. This is often seen in organizational psychology, which emphasize person–organization fit and company culture. While specific job skills can be taught, personality traits are stable and are much more difficult to change, which makes it a valid consideration for managers when selecting between candidates.

Employers may use personality tests as a tool to screen for potential undesirable behaviors, such as dishonesty or aggression. These tests are viewed as tools to detect ‘red flags’ prior to making any hiring decisions.

=== Personality assessments in hiring ===
Employers are increasingly prioritizing applicants’ personality characteristics and behavioral traits over technical qualifications in the hiring process. The most known model in personality psychology is the Big Five model, which includes agreeableness, conscientiousness, emotional stability, extraversion, and openness to experience. This has come to popularity in recent times due to meta-analyses which have shown that traits such as conscientiousness and emotional stability modestly predict job performance. However, general mental ability has been championed as the most accurate predictor across all job types. Despite this, managers may place greater emphasis on personality traits, particularly agreeableness and conscientiousness, than on General Mental Ability (GMA) tests when going through the hiring process. This is a large common theme in fields like hospitality, where employees are seen as the boundaries between guests and the organization. This indicates inconsistency between predictors of job performance and hiring practices, and suggests that personality traits may be overvalued compared to cognitive ability in some industries.

Researchers find that managers may place less emphasis on general mental ability (GMA) in hiring decisions because they prioritize personality traits like reliability and cooperativeness. These traits are more immediately observable and valued in day-to-day workplace interactions. These organizational citizenship behaviors are valuable for managers as they are linked with overall team effectiveness. This preference challenges the idea of expected utility theory, which suggest that employers should hire candidates based on maximizing expected returns, usually in the form of increased productivity or revenue.

Situational Judgement Tests (SJTs) are also increasingly used to assess non-academic traits in hiring. A 2020 meta-analysis by Webster et al. reported a moderate correlation (r = 0.32) between SJT scores and relevant workplace performance.

=== Criticisms ===
Recent studies warn hiring based on extraversion is a form of personality discrimination, and can be ethically similar to discrimination based on race or gender. Räsänen and Lippert-Rasmussen (2024) argue that favoring extraverted candidates is a violation of two core ideas of employment ethics: the Relevance Principle, that hiring should be based on traits relevant to job performance, and the Fairness Principle, that selection should not depend on characteristics individuals cannot control. Extraversion maintains a weak correlation with job performance in most roles and is largely shaped by genetics and socialization, thus, researchers argue that selecting candidates on this basis may be unjust. The authors further argue that present-day societal norms favor extraversion, inherently marginalizing introverts, which mirrors other forms of discrimination. This directly favors personality hires as they are normally individuals who score high in extraversion.

Critics also argue that many popular personality tests, such as the Myers-Briggs Type Indicator and the MMPI, were not originally made to be utilized in employment contexts. This is mainly because they lack predictive validity for job performance in most roles. Researchers note that personality traits fail to be generalized across different real-world contexts, which raises doubts that personality characteristics can accurately predict employee workplace behavior.

Personality traits are measured through self-reports. Self-report measures are largely susceptible to biases and faking, which negatively impacts their overall validity. Studies indicate that individuals who fake on personality tests tend to have lower average job performance, which shows unreliability in their usage. Traits like extraversion and conscientiousness are particularly vulnerable, since they are often viewed a universally desirable personality traits. In a study examining participants’ perceptions of how they presented themselves, individuals were able to fake an Implicit Association Test (IAT) measuring extraversion but were unable to do so for and IAT measuring conscientiousness. These findings suggest that personality assessments may be vulnerable to faking, which raises concerns about the reliability of such measures in personality-based hiring.

== See also ==
- Cult of personality
