= Paid survey =

Incentivized statistical survey

A paid or incentivized survey is a type of statistical survey where the participants/members are rewarded through an incentive program, generally entry into a sweepstakes program or a small cash reward, for completing one or more surveys.

== Details ==
A paid survey is used to collect quantitative information about the participants' personal and economic habits set against their particular demographic.

Legitimate surveys are usually unpaid (as with a Gallup poll) or incentivized. Surveys where the respondent must pay or purchase products to join a panel are generally scams, as are sites that disappear before paying the participants. Legitimate surveys do not need credit card information from respondents.

Paid survey apps are often viewed and marketed as a form of a side hustle, though with a lot of survey apps opinions are usually split. Starting from the 2010s, a significant number of mobile based survey apps began appearing on the Google Play store and App Store, with estimates now saying around 58.2% of all paid surveys are completed on mobile.

== See also ==
- Payment methods
- Survey data collection
