= Job embeddedness =

Factors influencing employee retention

Job embeddedness is the collection of forces that influence employee retention. It can be distinguished from turnover in that its emphasis is on all of the factors that keep an employee on the job, rather than the psychological process one goes through when quitting. The scholars who introduced job embeddedness described the concept as consisting of three key components (links, fit, and sacrifice), each of which are important both on and off the job. Job embeddedness is therefore conceptualized as six dimensions: links, fit, and sacrifice between the employee and organization, and links, fit and sacrifice between the employee and the community.

== Theoretical background ==
Job embeddedness was first introduced by Mitchell and colleagues in an effort to improve traditional employee turnover models. According to these models, factors such as job satisfaction and organizational commitment and the individual's perception of job alternatives together predict an employee's intent to leave and subsequently, turnover (e.g.,). Since these scholars suggest traditional models only modestly predict turnover, Mitchell et al. proposed job embeddedness as an alternative model and incorporated "off-the-job" factors (e.g. attachment to family) and other organizational factors (e.g. attachment to working groups) that have also been shown to affect employee retention, but were not included in these traditional models.

When creating this alternative model for explaining why employees stay on a job, Mitchell and colleagues drew on research from Lee and Mitchell's unfolding model of turnover. This line of research suggests that many of those who leave a job are a) mostly satisfied with their jobs, b) do not search for an alternative position before leaving, c) and quit due to some sudden off-the-job event. Results of the initial study indicated that job embeddedness predicted both intent to leave and actual turnover, and was a better predictor of voluntary turnover than job satisfaction, organizational commitment, and job search alternatives.

Mitchell and colleagues describe job embeddedness as "a net or web in which an individual can become stuck". Those who are highly embedded have many closely connected ties in both the community and the organization. These individuals are more likely to remain at a current job than those who have fewer connections. As mentioned above, job embeddedness as originally introduced is conceptualized as having three components.

== Dimensions ==
=== Fit ===
Fit is defined as an employee's "perceived compatibility or comfort level" with the organization and surrounding environment. Important components of fit between an employee and the organization include an individual's career goals, personal values, as well as more immediate job-specific factors such as job knowledge, demands, skills, and abilities. In terms of an employee's surrounding environment, components of employee-community fit include weather, location, amenities, political climate, and availability of entertainment options. The better fit one has with the organization and the community, the more embedded one is in the job.

=== Links ===
A second key aspect of job embeddedness is links, the number of connections (formal or informal) that a person has with the surrounding community and the organization itself. Links between the employee and the organization may include connections with other people or groups in the organization, while community-specific links encompass a broad range of connections. These community-specific connections range from relationships with family members and non-work friends, to other off-the-job social institutions and the physical environment itself. The more links a person has with the organization and community, the more embedded one is in the organization.

=== Sacrifice ===
The third dimension of job embeddedness, sacrifice, is the "perceived cost of material or psychological benefits that may be forfeited from broken links [with the organization and/or community] by leaving a job". Organizational sacrifices are the loss of colleagues, worthwhile projects, job-related perks, as well as "switching costs" (e.g. the loss of job stability and/or possibility of advancement, accrued eligibility for a pension plan). Community sacrifices might be the loss of a safe, attractive home, desirable neighborhood characteristics, non-work friends, or an easy commute. The sacrifice between an employee and the community is usually more highly associated with job embeddedness if the individual is required to relocate when changing jobs.

== Measurement ==
Job embeddedness is primarily assessed using one of two measures, a composite scale developed by the scholars who introduced the concept, and a global measure of job embeddedness. The developers of the composite scale designed the measure to quantify the six dimensions of job embeddedness: fit, sacrifice, and links, both on-the-job and off-the-job. Test administrators report results with an overall score that is the average of the scores for each of six dimensions. The initial composite measure consisted of 48 items thought to represent predictors of an individual's embeddedness on and off the job. The more items endorsed by the examinee, the more embedded the individual is in the job, and higher levels of embeddedness imply a lower likelihood of quitting. A shorter, 21-item composite scale has been used (e.g.,) that similarly predicts voluntary quitting. Most of the items are likert-type items such that the responses indicate the level of agreement or disagreement with the statement. Several fill in the blank and yes/no items are also included. The following table gives a sample item for each of the six dimensions.

Dimensions	Sample item
Fit to Community	"This community is a good match for me."
Fit to Organization	"My job utilizes my skills and talents well."
Links to Community	"Do you own the home you live in?"
Links to Organization	"How long have you worked for this company?"
Community-Related Sacrifice	"Leaving this community would be very hard."
Organization-Related Sacrifice	"My promotional opportunities are excellent here."

The global measure of job embeddedness is a 7-item scale that represents the general level of embeddedness of an employee in an organization, with "off-the job" embeddedness not directly measured. Crossley and colleagues developed this global measure with the belief that the "whole is greater than the sum of its parts". Moreover, the scale is intentionally reflective, which means that the developers intended for the concept (i.e. job embeddedness) to cause the item responses. This is in direct contrast to the original composite measure, which was designed so that the item responses form or cause job embeddedness (a formative scale). In the global measure, instructions direct respondents to consider both work and non-work related factors, and rate their agreement with the following seven statements.

1. I feel attached to this organization.
2. It would be difficult for me to leave this organization
3. I'm too caught up in this organization to leave.
4. I feel tied to this organization.
5. I simply could not leave the organization I work for.
6. It would be easy for me to leave this organization. (reverse scored)
7. I am tightly connected to this organization.

This difference in scale (reflective versus formative) and whether to consider job embeddedness as an overall impression or the sum of its parts (global versus composite), has created some controversy among scholars in organizational behavior management and Industrial and organizational psychology as to which scale should be used to measure job embeddedness. Primarily, the controversy concerns three issues for the composite scale: the statistical limitations of a formative scale, a question as to whether some of the items are reflexive, and if the scale fully covers all the aspects of job embeddedness. The global measure has an advantage due to its length and statistical flexibility, but it does not cover the depth gleaned from the composite scale, which includes off-the-job factors (see for a complete review of measurement issues). Zhang and colleagues suggest the research purpose should determine the most relevant scale.

== Similar terms ==
Yao, Lee, Mitchell, Burton, and Sablynski review and differentiate similar terms based on which concepts are most similar to job embeddedness overall, those that relate most closely to the idea of a two-dimensional concept (on and off-the-job), and terms that tend to parallel the individual six dimensions of job embeddedness. Social networks embeddedness was identified as an idea that was most similar to job embeddedness overall. Both account for the influence of social relationships on behavior, the authors draw the distinction that social networks embeddedness describes a broader concept that includes economic implications for organizations and institutions, whereas job embeddedness refers to specific individual behavior. Secondly, Yao and colleagues identified several off-the-job factors that were used in a variety of studies of employee turnover theories. The authors admit to using these to develop the two-dimensional model of job embeddedness. Even though scholars have considered these various factors in previous research, and these factors would seem most closely related to the two-dimensional concept of job embeddedness, the researchers argue that others have not used the same off-the-job factors consistently. Using the same off-the-job factors does allow for statistical testing within the job embeddedness framework. It is the inclusion of these non-work factors that others believe differentiate job embeddedness from similar concepts, such as organizational commitment, job satisfaction, and intentions to quit. Yao and colleagues' last category, in which several similar concepts were directly compared to each of the six factors of job embeddedness, may be best summarized as a differentiation based on scope, with some broader and some more specific than job embeddedness. For example, Yao and colleagues point out that some could argue links-organization is similar to organizational identification because they both detect compatibility with the organization. However, these scholars indicate that organizational identity deals with significance for the self, whereas, links-organization may encompass a broader non-emotional perception of one's connections to different aspects of the organizations. In contrast, Zhang and colleagues only chose to analyze the fit and sacrifice dimensions in their review of the uniqueness of job embeddedness. They cited multiple studies, which support that fit and sacrifice, are highly related to one another that may indicate there is evidence against using these two facets to create four separate factors. For example, the fit-community item, "This community is a good fit for me", may be just another way of phrasing or conceptualizing, the community-sacrifice item, "Leaving this community would be very hard". In summary, many scholars have explored if job embeddedness truly captures a distinct concept, and these same scholars point out that more research is needed regarding its specific dimensions as originally proposed.

== Consequences ==
Several studies have found evidence for job embeddedness as a predictor of intent to leave the job, and in some cases, actual turnover. Job embeddedness has also been found to predict retention, the opposite of turnover. Moreover, job embeddedness accounts for variance in turnover beyond that which is predicted by all major models of turnover. These findings received additional support from researchers who used meta-analysis to confirm this relationship using 65 samples, which included 42,907 participants. Job embeddedness had significant effects on actual turnover, even after controlling for job satisfaction, affective commitment, and job alternatives. Similarly, job embeddedness accounted for significant incremental variance in both turnover intentions and actual turnover. These results suggest that job embeddedness makes a unique contribution to intent to leave and turnover behavior beyond that which is predicted by traditional turnover models. Other factors that determine the strength of the relationship between job embeddedness and turnover include gender, organizational type, and national culture.

Felps and colleagues found that low levels of job embeddedness were contagious, spreading from coworker to coworker. Coworkers with low levels of job embeddedness influenced their coworkers to quit. There is some evidence for a differential effect of on-the-job versus off-the-job embeddedness on turnover. For example, Lee and colleagues found that off-the-job embeddedness predicted voluntary turnover and absenteeism, whereas on-the job embeddedness predicted organizational citizenship behavior and job performance. Off-the-job embeddedness may contribute to withdrawal because an individual who is greatly occupied by non-work obligations may have less time to devote to work. In contrast, Allen found that on-the-job embeddedness, but not off-the-job embeddedness, was negatively related to voluntary turnover (i.e. the higher employees are in on-the-job embeddedness, the less likely they are to quit). Burrows and colleagues found that being highly embedded on-the-job and having low embeddedness off-the-job reduced employee's risk of involuntary turnover moreso than being highly embedded both on- and off-the-job, thus highlighting a potential downside to being highly embedded in both domains.

== Additional Effects ==
Holtom and Inderrieden indicate the level of job embeddedness influences the strength of the relationship between a "shock" or sudden, unanticipated event (e.g. an unsolicited job offer, winning the lottery) and turnover behavior. Those who are low on embeddedness are more sensitive to the impact of the shock than those who are high on embeddedness. Job embeddedness may therefore act as a buffer on the effect of the shock, rendering those who are high on embeddedness less reactive to sudden changes. In contrast, those who are low on embeddedness are more likely to quit after experiencing the shock. Job embeddedness may have the opposite effect on the relationship between procedural injustice and an employee's reaction to the injustice. That is, someone who is high on embeddedness may react more negatively to injustice than someone who is low on embeddedness. Researchers have also found that job embeddedness influences effect of leader-member exchange on task performance.

== Cultural differences ==
In collectivistic cultures, there may be more of a tendency to leave "voluntarily" due to pressure from family to fulfill domestic obligations or to meet financial obligations in order to provide basic needs for the family. In either case, these cultural demands may supersede an individual's desire to leave or stay with an organization based on job embeddedness. The linkage between off-the-job embeddedness and turnover has been shown to be stronger in collectivistic cultures versus individualistic cultures in a recent meta-analytic review. However, in a related cultural study, Hispanics, predominantly considered to be collectivists, were found to have stronger embeddedness in the community (i.e., off-the-job embeddedness), but not with the organization (i.e., on-the-job embeddedness) as compared to Caucasians. Furthermore, in Mallol's study, stronger embeddedness in the community did not predict voluntary turnover, but on-the-job embeddedness was predictive of voluntary turnover for both groups. The authors specify that knowledge of off-the-job embeddedness in the Hispanic culture is especially relevant for organizations that may require long-distance job relocation. In addition, the authors suggest Hispanics' closer ties to the community may inform turnover in a relocation circumstance. Scholars suggest that language also plays a role in job embeddedness. Speaking in a regional dialect (e.g., Cantonese) in Chinese organizations where this dialect is widely spoken has been shown to increase job embeddedness among employees over and above speaking in the national language, Mandarin, despite the fact that almost all are fluent in Mandarin. Even though some cultural differences of job embeddedness has been documented, most researchers submitting work on the topic still advocate for the need to replicate their work across cultures to increase the generalizability of their findings (e.g.,).

== See also ==
- Organizational identification
- Social networks
- Employee retention
- Job satisfaction
- Organizational commitment
- Organizational citizenship behavior
