= Resenteeism =

Entrapped disenchanted employee

In human resources and occupational psychology, resenteeism refers to a phenomenon where employees remain in roles they find deeply dissatisfying, resulting in feelings of resentment, anger, and entrapment. This state typically occurs when individuals perceive a lack of alternative employment options or are concerned about the financial and professional risks associated with a career change. While the term is contemporary, the underlying behaviour is classified in academic literature as a form of work disengagement, which involves the cognitive, emotional, and physical distancing of oneself from a work role.

== History and etymology ==
The term is a portmanteau of "resentment", "absenteeism" and "presenteeism". It was coined by the staff management software provider RotaCloud and gained significant cultural momentum in 2023 through social media platforms such as TikTok.

Resenteeism is regarded as an evolution of "quiet quitting"- the practice of doing the bare minimum required by a contract. While quiet quitting often serves as a survival strategy to reclaim work-life balance, resenteeism is distinguished by its more active emotional state of frustration and disillusionment. It emerged prominently following the COVID-19 pandemic and the subsequent Great Resignation, representing the psychological state of workers who did not leave their positions but felt increasingly embittered by deteriorating workplace conditions, the loss of remote flexibility and the rising cost of living.

== Signs and behaviours ==
Individuals experiencing resenteeism are often described as being "checked-out" or "phoning it in". Because they feel trapped by financial obligations, their dissatisfaction manifests through specific observable behaviours.

- Withdrawal from culture: Subtle signals include stopping the use of company-branded items, such as stickers or apparel, and withdrawing from non-mandatory company social events.
- Performance metrics: Unlike engaged workers, those practicing resenteeism seek to reduce discretionary effort, often resulting in tardiness, early departures, and a lack of initiative.
- Vocal Dissatisfaction: Employees may spread dissatisfaction within their teams, a behaviour sometimes referred to as "loud quitting" or "cyber venting", where they malign the employer on social media platforms.
- Organisational Cynicism: This is defined as a negative attitude involving distrust and de-identification with the organisation's management and goals.

== Theoretical frameworks ==
=== Conservation of resources theory ===
The COR framework posits that individuals strive to obtain and protect valued "resources", such as time, energy and mental health. Resenteeism is interpreted as a functional coping response; when an employee feels their resources are being threatened or depleted by a toxic environment, they disengage and "withdraw" to prevent further loss of their remaining mental and physical energy.

=== Job Demands-Resources (JD-R) Model ===
The JD-R model (Demerouti et al., 2001; Schaufeli & Bakker, 2004) distinguishes between job demands, e.g., workload, and job resources, e.g., autonomy. Resenteeism is often triggered by an imbalance where demands exceed available resources, leading to exhaustion and disengagement. Longitudinal research suggests that an increase in workload, a challenge stressor, can actually drive organisational cynicism if it is not balance by an increase in autonomy or support.

=== The Power of Momentum ===
This theory focuses on "within-person changes" over time (Gao-Urhahn et al., 2016). It suggests that employees are more affected by the deterioration of their work conditions, such as a sudden loss of autonomy, than by having a consistently "bad" job. This explains why resenteeism spiked post-pandemic: the sharp shift from remote flexibility back to rigid office mandates created a negative "momentum" that fueled resentment.

== Causes and antecedents ==
Research identifies a typology of causes for resenteeism, categorised into three levels:

1. Individual Factors: Younger workers, particularly Generation Z, report the highest levels of coasting, 47%, and the least enthusiasm for their roles, often due to a lack of autonomy and meaningful work in entry-level positions.
2. Job Attributes: Causes include micromanagement, lack of role clarity and "performance punishment"- where high-performing employees are unfairly burdened with additional work without reward. Contemporary discussions have also highlighted employees losing sight of how their work contributes to a broader purpose. In an Inc. article on leadership, Henna Pryor discussed "quiet disorientation", a term she attributed to John R. Miles, to describe this condition.
3. Organisational Conditions: Poor Management tactics, such as "quiet cutting" (re-assigning roles to encourage quitting) or "office peacocking" (making the office look attractive to force a return), create a climate of suspicion and mistrust. Additionally, workplace cronyism and favouritism marginalise productive employees, breeding deep resentment.

== Consequences ==
- Economic Impact: Workplace disengagement is estimated to cost approximately $8.9 trillion in global Gross Domestic Product (GDP).
- Mental Health: Prolonged resenteeism is linked to occupational burnout, symptoms of depression and "psychological unease".
- Organisational Health: Resentful employees can undermine team morale and leadership, creating ongoing crises that harm the overall productivity of the business.

== Management and mitigation ==
To address resenteeism, researchers and HR professionals recommend shifting away from rigid performance management toward fostering human connection.

1. Goal Alignment: Employees who feel their individual goals align with company goals are reported to be 35% more efficient.
2. Autonomy and Ownership: Allowing employees more discretion over how and when their work is completed can reduce feelings of entrapment.
3. Supportive Leadership: Frequent one-on-one connections and peer feedback are considered "game-changers" for reducing cynicism.
4. Psychological Safety: Creating an environment where employees can bring their "true selves" to work without fear of negative consequences is essential for preventing disengagement.
