= Overemployment =

Practice of an single employee simultaneously holding multiple full-time jobs

Senior Airman Thomas Keisler, 31st Fighter Wing public affairs specialist, poses for a photo at Aviano Air Base, Italy, Oct. 29, 2021. The photo demonstrated the feeling of being overwhelmed in the workplace. (U.S.

Overemployment refers to the practice of an individual employee simultaneously holding two or more full-time jobs, often with overlapping work hours and without employer awareness. Such an employee is referred to as being overemployed. The term emerged in the 2020s in the United States amidst the COVID-19 recession, and most often refers to white-collar workers.

While usually not illegal, many full-time employment contracts contain clauses of exclusivity that make overemployment a breach thereof warranting disciplinary action or termination of employment. Even in at-will employment jurisdictions, employees wishing to take up a second job may also be subject to non-compete clauses warranting the consultation of an employment attorney.

== Methods ==
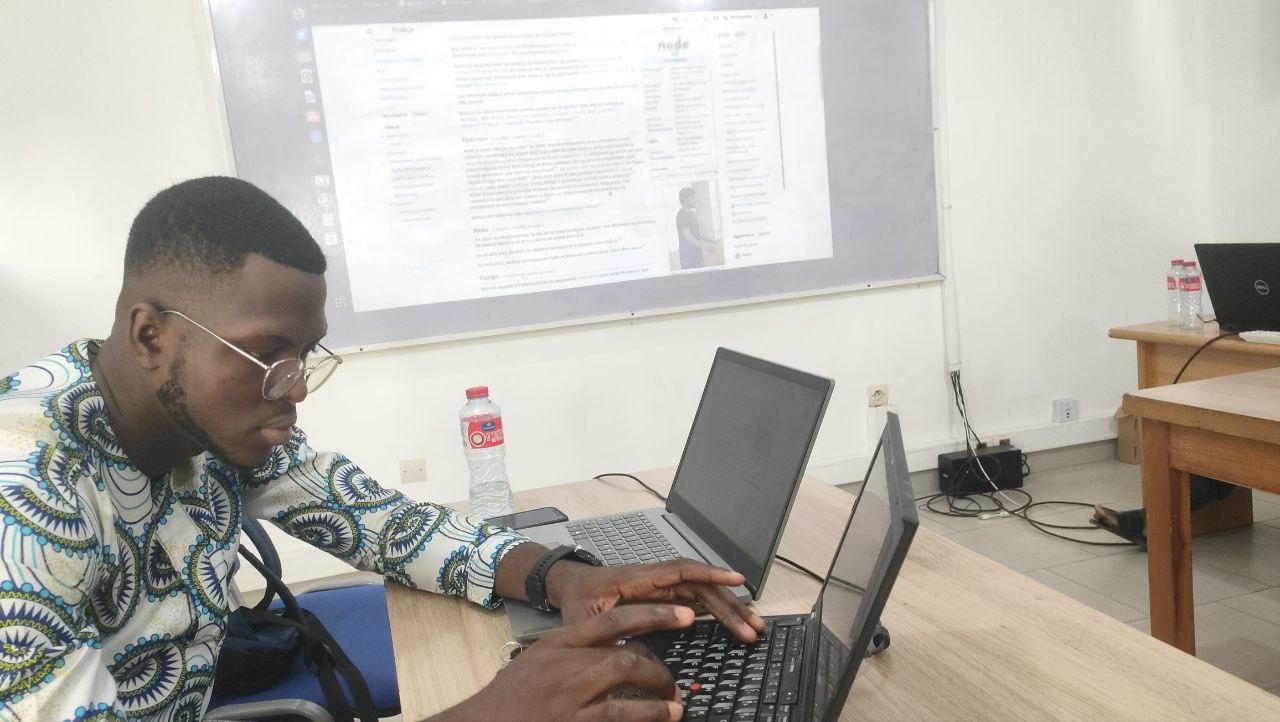
Overemployed workers usually exploit remote work arrangements.

According to a report by Vanity Fair, online communities exist around overemployment, to discuss and share techniques to avoid getting found out by coworkers. One such discussion board on the social media site Reddit had grown to 110,000 members by 2022. Reportedly, some users are employed in more than 2 jobs, with some claiming up to 5.

Overemployment is made feasible by means of remote work arrangements, allowing the employee to surreptitiously put time in for their multiple jobs simultaneously. To avoid detection, employees enlist multiple personal computers so as to appear at work for each job, using mouse jigglers to not alert supervisors of dereliction.

== See also ==
- Side job, also known as a "side hustle", "side gig", or "moonlighting"
