= Retail workers in the United States =

Employees of retail stores

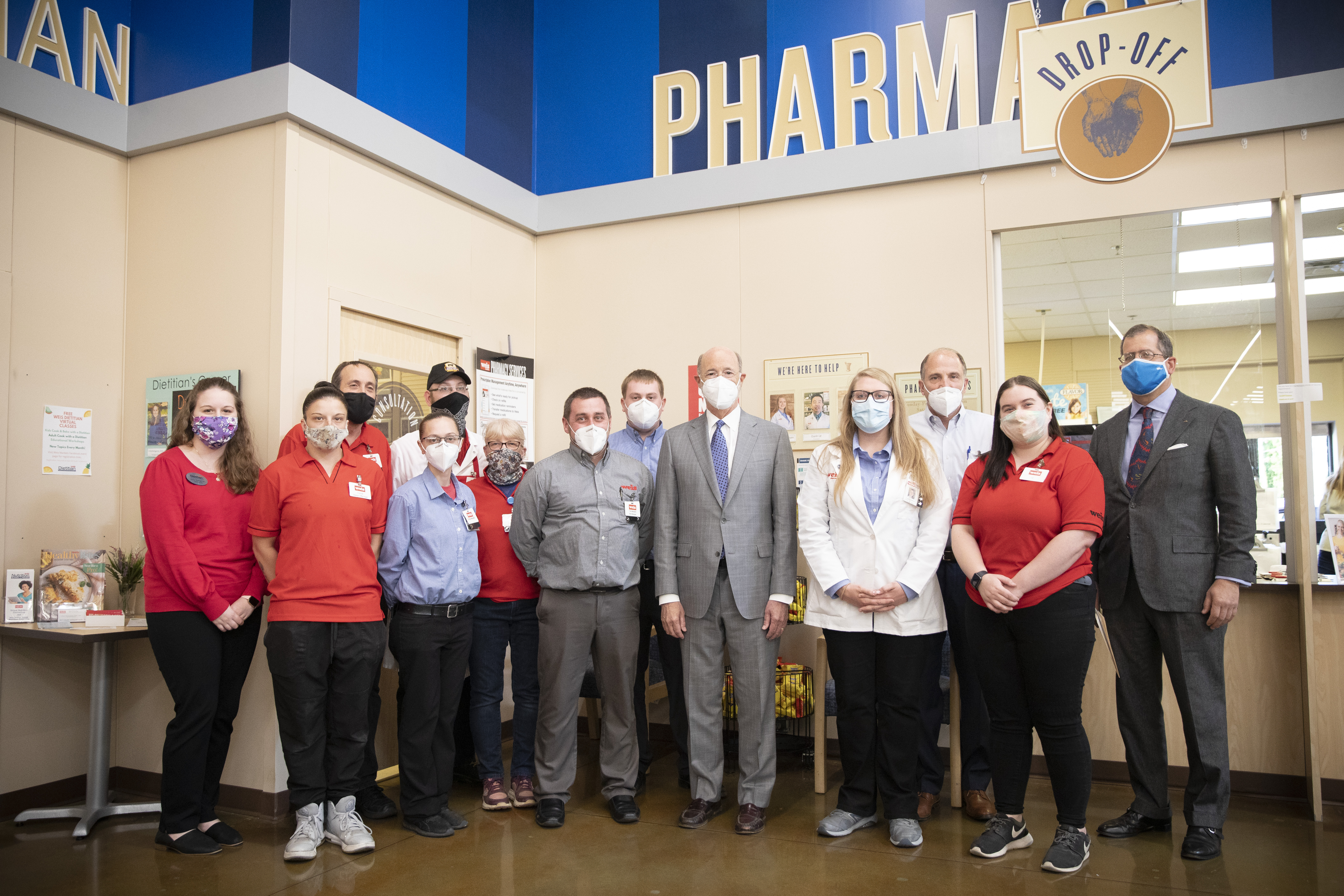
Former Governor of Pennsylvania Tom Wolf poses with retail workers

Retail workers are people who are employed by any form of retail store. Typically one of the first jobs people work in, many retail workers are as young as 14. The jobs of a typical retail worker include processing customers payments, and helping customers around the store, and little training is required.

== Background ==
In 2017, over 12,000 physical stores closed due to factors including over-expansion of malls, rising rents, bankruptcies, leveraged buyouts, low quarterly profits outside holiday binge spending, delayed effects of the Great Recession, and changes in spending habits. American consumers have shifted their purchasing habits due to various factors, including experience-spending versus material goods and homes, casual fashion in relaxed dress codes, as well as the rise of e-commerce, mostly in the form of competition from juggernaut companies such as Amazon.com and Walmart. A 2017 Business Insider report dubbed this phenomenon the "Amazon effect," and calculated that Amazon.com was generating greater than 50% of the growth of retail sales. Dissenting economists and experts asserted that recent retail closures are a market correction, suggesting that "retail apocalypse" is a misleading phrase that instills insecurity in the 16 million retail workers in the U.S.

Beginning in 2021, many retail workers began leaving their jobs than there were being hired, mostly in part due to burnout, stress, and other hindering factors on workers' mental health, as well as wage stagnation amid rising cost of living, limited opportunities for career advancement, hostile work environments, lack of benefits, inflexible remote-work policies, and long-lasting job dissatisfaction, in a massive loss of jobs known as the Great Resignation.

== See also ==
- Right to sit in the United States
