= Economic stimulus payment =

Economic stimulus payment or economic impact payment may refer to several tax rebates, tax credits, tax deductions and grants from the federal government of the United States:

- Tax rebates as part of the Economic Growth and Tax Relief Reconciliation Act of 2001
- Tax rebates as part of the Economic Stimulus Act of 2008
- First coronavirus stimulus (called "EIP 1" by the IRS), as part of the CARES Act, March 2020
- Second coronavirus stimulus ("EIP 2"), as part of the Consolidated Appropriations Act, 2021 (Dec. 2020)
- Third coronavirus stimulus ("EIP 3"), as part of the American Rescue Plan Act of (March) 2021

== See also ==
- Stimulus (economics)
  - For government spending as stimulus, see fiscal policy
  - For an increase in money designed to speed growth, see monetary policy
