= Coffee badging =

Coming to work at an office for a short period and leaving to work elsewhere

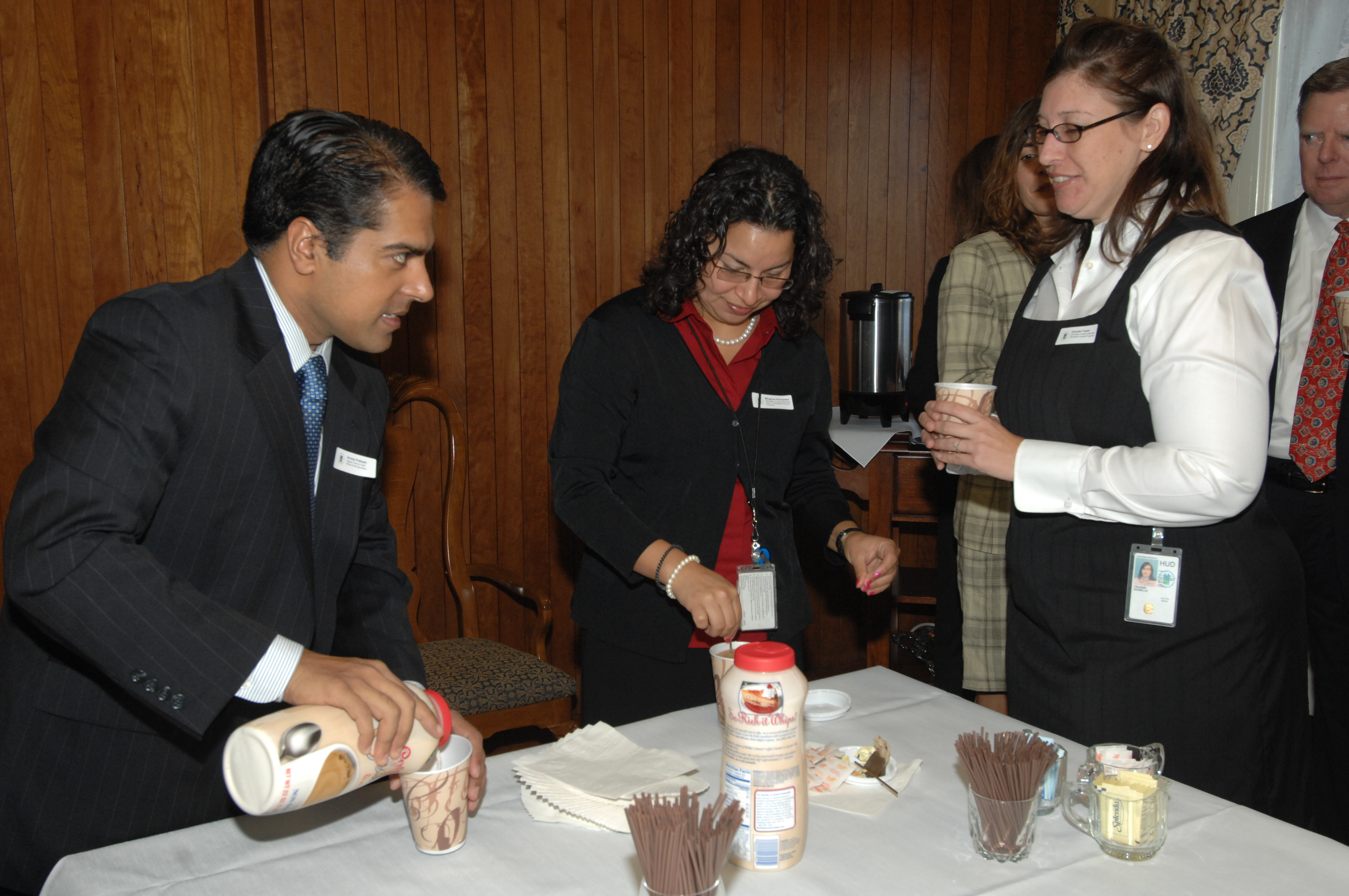
Employees drinking coffee in an office

Coffee badging (also known as pint badging) refers to the practice of employees swiping their work pass on entrance turnstiles and staying briefly at the office, typically long enough to drink a coffee, before departing to work from elsewhere. Workers do this to fulfill in-office attendance requirements for hybrid and remote workers which arose following the return to in-person work following the COVID-19 pandemic.

The practice of coffee badging shows how employers are struggling to create attractive, productive and stress-free office environments where employees willingly gather and reflects an erosion of trust between employees and their employers. Coffee badging has been described as a challenge to organic office participation.

Coffee badging has been criticized for incentivizing the appearance of participation over productivity and contributing to empty office space. Coffee badging is a form of impression management in response to employee surveillance efforts by management.

The term was coined in June 2023 by Owl Labs in a workforce management report.

== See also ==
- Absenteeism
