= Work-to-rule =

Industrial action in which employees do no more than the minimum required

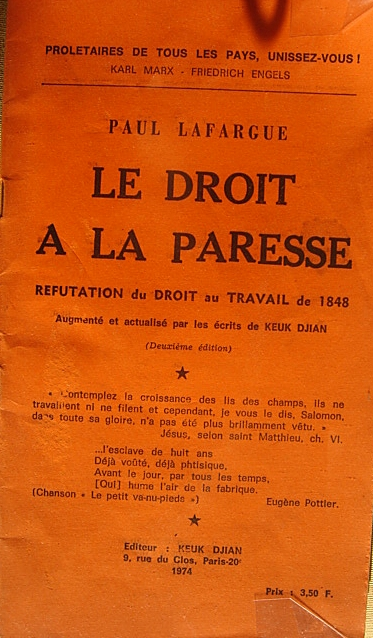
The Right to be Lazy by Paul Lafargue discusses how work should not come at the expense of workers, and to embrace laziness instead.

Work-to-rule, also known as an Italian strike or a slowdown in United States usage, and sciopero bianco ('white strike') in Italy, is a job action in which employees do no more than the minimum required by the rules of their contract or job, and strictly follow time-consuming rules normally not enforced. It is a passive-aggressive form of labor opposition. This may cause a slowdown or decrease in productivity if the employer does not hire enough employees or pay the appropriate salary and consequently does not have the requirements needed to run normally.

It is a form of protest against low pay and poor working conditions, and is considered less disruptive than a strike; obeying the rules is not susceptible to disciplinary action or loss of pay. It can also highlight rules that are technically in place but impractical and thus hamper the organization, if they were to be followed as written. In practice, there may be ambiguous conditions – for example, a contract that requires working additional hours when necessary, or a requirement to work to operational requirements. In such cases, workers have been recommended to ask for a written direction to carry out the work, which can be used as evidence if necessary.

== Applications ==
Work-to-rule may be employed formally or informally by workers and organizers as an alternative to traditional strike action in contexts where strikes are prohibited, either by law or due to lack of workforce union participation or political will. Work-to-rule has been employed in sectors where striking is prohibited, including education, policing, and healthcare, as well as in authoritarian societies like Russia, which prohibit strikes generally. In this respect, work-to-rule tactics can resemble other forms of industrial action such as an overtime ban or blue flu.

=== Quiet quitting ===
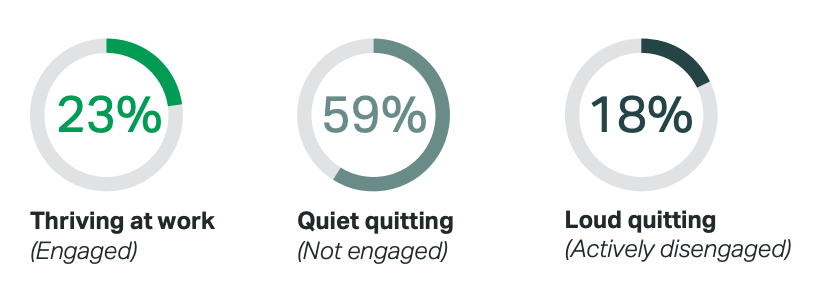
Gallup data showing 2022 global poll on employee engagement and quiet quitting.

Quiet quitting is a specific, often spontaneous or grassroots application of work-to-rule tactics. Despite the name, the philosophy of quiet quitting is not connected to quitting a job outright, but rather, employees avoid going above and beyond the call of duty by doing the bare minimum required and engage in work-related activities solely within defined work hours. Proponents of quiet quitting also refer to it as "acting your wage", or "calibrated contributing", and say that the goal of quiet quitting is not primarily to disrupt the workplace as part of an organized movement, but to avoid occupational burnout and to reassert autonomy and work-life balance on an individual level.

There are no verifiable sources as to who coined the phrase. It was also thought to be inspired by the tang ping ('lying flat') movement that began in April 2021 on Chinese social media and became a buzzword on Sina Weibo. Later that year, Chinese Internet users combined tang ping with involution, a process researched by American anthropologist Clifford Geertz in his 1963 book Agricultural Involution. The book gained attention in the late 1980s from social sciences research about China which led to the term "involution" gaining great attention in China. In 2020, "involution" became one of the most commonly used words on Chinese-language media, where it is used to describe the feeling of exhaustion in an overly competitive society.

After tang ping became a buzzword and inspired numerous Internet memes, business magazine ABC Money claimed it resonated with a growing silent majority of youth disillusioned by the officially endorsed "Chinese Dream" that encourages a life of hard work and sacrifice with no actual life satisfaction to show for it. An editorial published in the journal of the American Institute of Chemical Engineers defined quiet quitting as a rejection of "hustle culture" and the belief that value of work is intrinsically tied to number of hours.

Though the term is recent, the ideas behind quiet quitting are not and go back decades. The phrase "quiet quitting" became popular during 2022 in the United States, mostly through the social video platform TikTok. In 2022, quiet quitting experienced a surge in popularity in numerous publications following a viral TikTok video, which was inspired by a Business Insider article. That same year, Gallup found that roughly half of the American workforce were quiet quitters.

Industry observers argue the COVID-19 pandemic accelerated the social movement of quiet quitting, with a resurgence in labor sentiments among Generation Z as a result of the economic fallout. A 2021 survey conducted by the American Psychological Association revealed that forty percent of American workers surveyed intend to change jobs, which the report attributed to lack of compensation for the amount of stress and burnout endured. In 2023, a trend called quiet cutting was seen where employers would reassign rather than lay off employees, suggesting a possible shift in workplace power. It is possible that conscious quitting might follow quiet quitting.

== Response ==
While individual contributors might think in terms of otherwise "engaged workers setting reasonable boundaries", their employers might see them instead as "slackers who are willfully underperforming". Depending on jurisdiction, work-to-rule may sometimes be considered by employers as malicious compliance, and they may attempt to pursue legal action against workers. While generally not grounds for legal retaliation on an individual basis, employers may attempt to enforce onerous contract terms such as:

- Mandatory overtime
- Breaks set by management
- Vague description including "ad-hoc task" or "as assigned"
- Termination for any reason

They may also take standard forms of action especially where custom terms were not negotiated during the offer:

- Warning and noting employee file for professional misconduct or insubordination
- Reassigning employee to insignificant, routine, or mundane tasks

The employer counterpart of 'quiet quitting' is 'quiet firing', in which an employer deliberately offers only a minimum wage and benefits and denies any advances in the hope that an unwanted employee will quit. The term has also been used to refer to employers reducing the scope of a worker's responsibilities to encourage them to quit voluntarily. "Quiet hiring" is another related term that has been used to describe a strategy by employers to give additional responsibilities and unpaid extra workload to hard-working employees.

In countries or sectors where other forms of striking is regulated or illegal, work-to-rule tactics may be subject to scrutiny or punishment. In the United States, work-to-rule tactics which are coordinated by a labor organization or its agents may be ruled and treated as a strike under the National Labor Relations Act, and may be interpreted as failure to bargain in good faith, a requirement of collective bargaining. In the case of non-union workplaces, employees suspected of work-to-rule tactics, organizing, or quiet quitting, may be fired if their employment is considered at-will, though such termination may still be considered wrongful if there is overt evidence it is done to infringe on workers' protected rights to organize.

== Examples ==
Cases of work-to-rule tactics have included:

- British postal workers normally arrived an hour before their official start time, did unpaid overtime at the end of deliveries, used their own (uninsured) cars for deliveries, and carried mailbags too heavy by health and safety guidelines. During a dispute they arrived at start time, stopped deliveries at the end of their allotted shift, only used official vans, and weighed mailbags to keep within the limit.
- French railway workers, who are not allowed to strike, were required by law to be sure of the safety of all bridges the train had to pass over; if doubtful of safety they had to consult other train crew members. During a dispute they inspected every bridge, and consulted other crew members on the bridge's condition in every instance; as a consequence, the trains did not arrive on time.
- Austrian postal workers normally accept without weighing all items that are obviously not overweight. During a dispute they observed the rule that all mail must be weighed, taking it to the scales, weighing, and then taking it back. The office was crammed with unweighed mail by the second day.
- German doctors, who are not permitted to strike, have employed work to rule tactics in protest of announced caps on insurance reimbursement.
- Workers may have the right to a specified number of toilet breaks; they may insist on taking the maximum allowed during a dispute.
- During a work-to-rule strike, teachers may choose to instruct students during classroom hours only; and not participate in extra-curricular activities such as sports, tutoring or meetings before/after school. Such tactics are associated with a significant reduction in standardized test scores by students at affected schools.
- Actions taken by police in the United States, including coordinated use of sick days, and declines in tickets issued and arrests made, may resemble work to rule tactics, however the exact terminology is disputed, partly because police are prohibited from striking, partly because of the contentious relationship between police, police unions, and the labor movement as a whole.
- In Paris, taxi drivers historically employed grève de zèle ("zeal strike") to protest municipal policies. By strictly adhering to the code routier (French traffic code), such as obeying all speed limits, refusing to use bus lanes, or stopping at every pedestrian crossing, drivers exploited the fact that Parisian traffic flow relies on routine, pragmatic violations of minor rules. Their collective over-compliance caused severe congestion, effectively paralyzing the city to pressure authorities.
- In 1984, French and Italian customs officers staged a work-to-rule tactic by meticulously inspecting every vehicle at border crossings, causing massive traffic jams. According to Belgian public broadcaster RTBF, these protests highlighted the inefficiency of systematic border checks and contributed to discussions that later led to the Schengen Agreement, which abolished many internal EU border controls.

Although the term quiet quitting was popularised in 2022, aspects of quiet quitting have existed in the workplace and popular culture for much longer. The film Office Space (1999) depicts a character engaging in quiet quitting; in the film, Ron Livingston's character Peter Gibbons abandons the concept of work entirely and does the bare minimum required of him.

== See also ==
- Blue flu
- Career catfishing
- Shirking
- Malicious compliance
- Great Resignation
- Lazy girl job
- Overtime ban
- Quiet cracking
- Tang ping
- Neijuan
