= Side job =

Additional job providing extra income

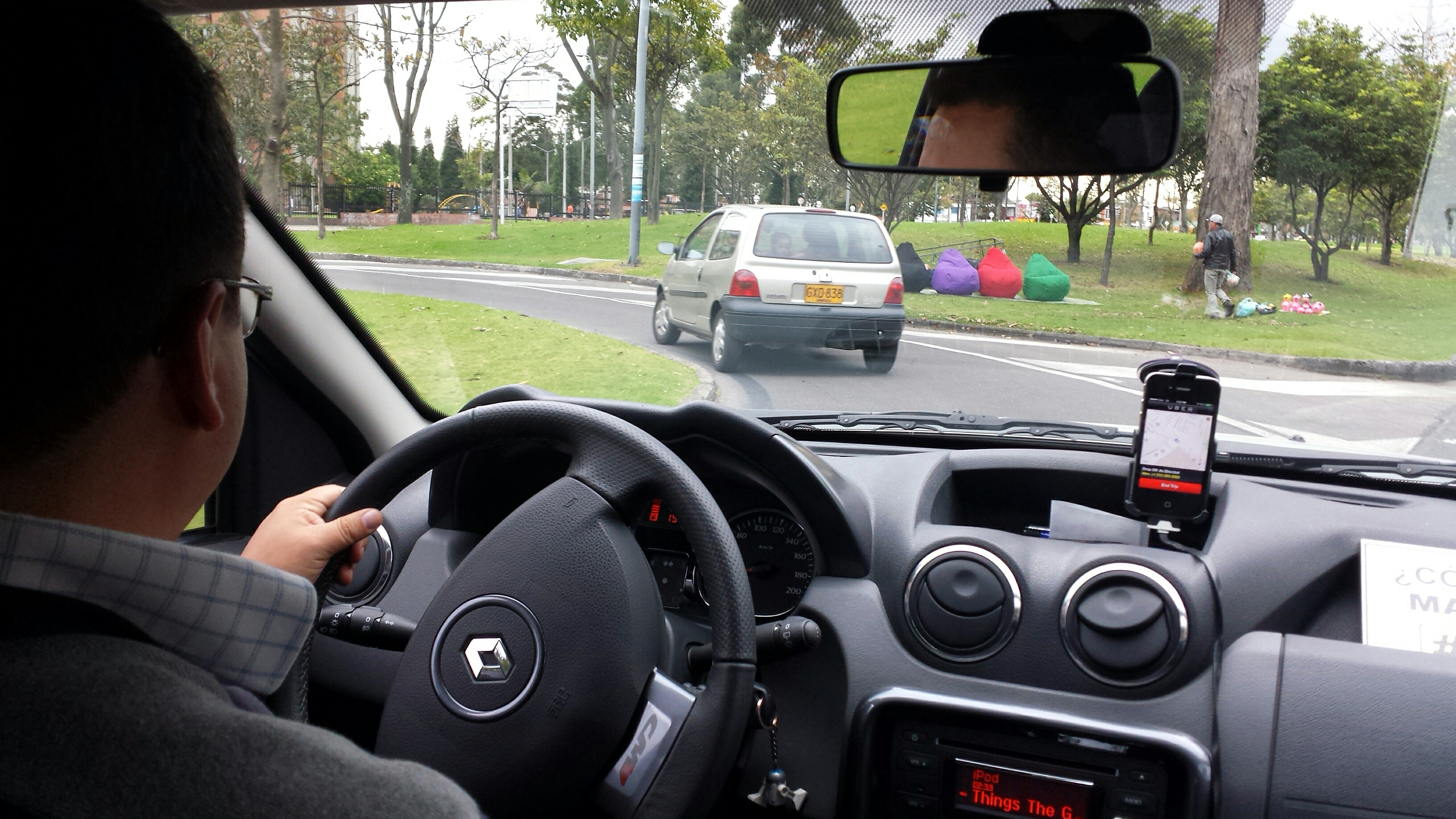
Providing ridesharing or food delivery services is a common side job in modern times.

A side job, also informally called a side hustle (or side gig or side project), is an extra job that a person takes in addition to their primary job in order to supplement their income or simply to turn their hobby into a micro-business. Side jobs may be done out of necessity when a person's main job does not provide sufficient income to support them, or simply out of a desire to earn more money or to try something interesting. Working a side job is also referred to as moonlighting, usually when it is performed after regular business hours. A side job can be a full-time job, part-time contract, freelance work, and a person can hold more than one side job.

A "day job" is defined as work a person does "to earn money so that [they] can do something else that [they] prefer but that does not pay [them] much money." Side jobs are typically tasks that can be completed on a part-time or freelance basis at the same time as having a day job. Examples include copywriting, ecommerce (such as selling products on Amazon), affiliate marketing, providing social media marketing services, freelance web design, foreign language lessons or translations, tutoring or coaching, graphic design, freelance writing, business management or participating in at home market research or opinion polls through paid surveys.

Side jobs have become more prevalent in the United States because of wage stagnation and low wage growth that have not kept up with the rising cost of living. Working a side job imposes a burden since it lengthens one's working hours. In a 2023 survey, nearly 39% of Americans reported having a side job, with 57% of New Yorkers needing one to make ends meet, and a third of U.S. adults said they required a side job to pay for basic household expenses. In the UK in 2019, 60% of students and graduates reported having a side job, and 43% required it to pay renting expenses.

The most common reason workers take on side jobs is to obtain additional disposable income. The side job can also be a means to pay off student loans, or to use one's creativity in ways normally not available in the traditional workplace. Millennials were the most likely to have a side job, often to provide a financial "safety net", leading them to be labeled the "side hustle generation". However, Gen Z has surpassed Millennials as the generation with the highest rate of working side jobs.

Soham Parekh, a software engineer from Mumbai, became a news story in 2025 for holding so many side jobs with Silicon Valley startups that he was a "serial non-sleeper". He illustrated the grueling lifestyle of a remote worker whose large collection of side jobs comprised a higher paying, albeit unsustainable, substitute for a single primary job.

== Companies that began as side projects ==
A number of large companies began as side projects pursued by their founders alongside full-time employment or other primary work.

- Nike - Phil Knight sold imported running shoes from the trunk of his car as Blue Ribbon Sports while working as an accountant, and did not leave accounting until the business could support him.
- Apple - Steve Wozniak designed the Apple I in his spare time while employed at Hewlett-Packard, and Steve Jobs was working at Atari when the two founded the company in 1976.
- Craigslist - Craig Newmark started the site in 1995 as an email list of local events sent to friends while he worked as a software engineer at Charles Schwab; it operated as a hobby for two years before becoming a company.
- Twitter - Twitter grew out of an internal side project at the podcasting startup Odeo, developed during a company hackathon in 2006 after Odeo's main product was undercut by Apple.
- GitHub - The platform was built on nights and weekends by Tom Preston-Werner and co-founders while they held other jobs, before launching publicly in 2008.
- Slack - Slack began as an internal communication tool built by the team at Tiny Speck while developing the online game Glitch; when the game was shut down, the tool became the company's product.
- Post-it Note (3M) - The adhesive and the product were developed under 3M's "15 percent time" policy, which allowed researchers to spend part of their working hours on projects of their own choosing.
- Gmail and Google News - Both products originated under Google's "20 percent time" policy, under which engineers devoted one day a week to projects outside their main assignments.
- Khan Academy - Salman Khan began recording tutoring videos for his cousins while working as a hedge fund analyst, and left the job in 2009 to run the organization full-time.
- Minecraft - Markus Persson developed the game in his free time while employed as a programmer, releasing early versions publicly before founding Mojang in 2010

== See also ==
- Cottage industry
- Part-time contract
- Workaholic
- Freelancer
- Overemployment, having two or more full-time jobs simultaneously
