= Electoral results for the district of Castlemaine and Maldon =

Australian district election results

This is a list of electoral results for the electoral district of Castlemaine and Maldon in Victorian state elections.

== Members for Castlemaine and Maldon ==
Member	Party	Term
Harry Lawson	Nationalist	1904–1927

== Election results ==
=== Elections in the 1920s ===
1924 Victorian state election: Castlemaine and Maldon
Party	Candidate	Votes	%	±%
Nationalist	Harry Lawson	3,075	68.0	−6.2
Labor	William Webber	1,450	32.0	+6.2
Total formal votes		4,525	99.8	+0.3
Informal votes		9	0.2	−0.3
Turnout		4,534	72.6	+7.1
Nationalist hold		Swing	−6.2	

1921 Victorian state election: Castlemaine and Maldon
Party	Candidate	Votes	%	±%
Nationalist	Harry Lawson	3,201	74.2	+6.2
Labor	Percy Clarey	1,113	25.8	−6.2
Total formal votes		4,314	99.5	+0.6
Informal votes		23	0.5	−0.6
Turnout		4,337	65.5	−7.8

1920 Victorian state election: Castlemaine and Maldon
Party	Candidate	Votes	%	±%
Nationalist	Harry Lawson	3,258	68.0	
Labor	Christopher Bennett	1,531	32.0	+32.0
Total formal votes		4,789	98.9	
Informal votes		53	1.1	
Turnout		4,842	73.3	
Nationalist hold		Swing	N/A	

=== Elections in the 1910s ===
1917 Victorian state election: Castlemaine and Maldon
Party	Candidate	Votes	%	±%
Nationalist	Harry Lawson	unopposed		
Nationalist hold		Swing		

1914 Victorian state election: Castlemaine and Maldon
Party	Candidate	Votes	%	±%
Liberal	Harry Lawson	3,662	70.3	+8.8
Labor	Luke Clough	1,547	29.7	−8.8
Total formal votes		5,209	98.3	−1.0
Informal votes		90	1.7	+1.0
Turnout		5,299	72.0	−5.6
Liberal hold		Swing	+8.8	

1911 Victorian state election: Castlemaine and Maldon
Party	Candidate	Votes	%	±%
Liberal	Harry Lawson	3,397	61.5	N/A
Labor	Luke Clough	2,125	38.5	+38.5
Total formal votes		5,522	99.3	
Informal votes		42	0.7	
Turnout		5,564	77.6	
Liberal hold		Swing	N/A	
