= James Whiteside McCay =

Australian army officer and politician (1864–1930)

The Honourable Sir James Whiteside McCay KCMG, KBE, CB, VD
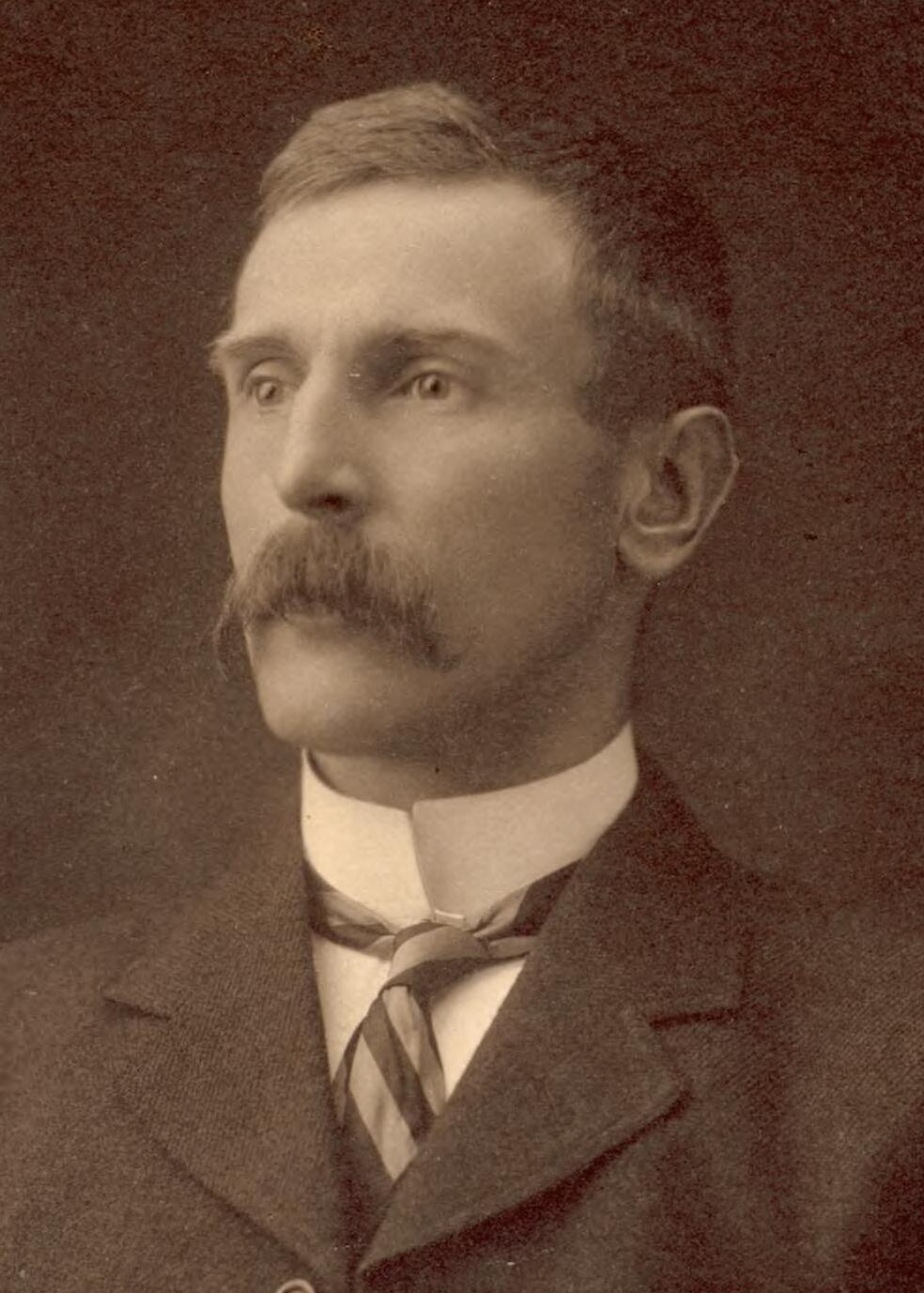

Minister for Defence
- In office 18 August 1904 – 2 July 1905
- Prime Minister: George Reid
- Preceded by: Anderson Dawson
- Succeeded by: Thomas Playford

Member of the Australian Parliament for Corinella
- In office 29 March 1901 – 12 December 1906
- Preceded by: New seat
- Succeeded by: Division abolished

Personal details
- Born: 21 December 1864 Ballynure, County Antrim, Ireland
- Died: 1 October 1930 (aged 65) Melbourne, Victoria, Australia
- Party: Protectionist
- Spouse: Julia Mary O'Meara (m. 1896; died 1915)
- Children: Margaret Mary ("Mardi") McCay; Beatrix Waring ("Bixie") McCay
- Education: University of Melbourne
- Occupation: Solicitor, politician, army officer

Military service
- Allegiance: Australia
- Branch/service: Australian Army
- Years of service: 1884–1926
- Rank: Lieutenant general
- Commands: AIF Depots in the United Kingdom (1917–19); 5th Division (1916); 2nd Infantry Brigade (1914–15); 8th Regiment (1900–07)
- Battles/wars: First World War; Gallipoli Campaign; Landing at Anzac Cove; Second Battle of Krithia; Western Front; Battle of Fromelles; Battle of the Somme
- Awards: Knight Commander of the Order of St Michael and St George; Knight Commander of the Order of the British Empire; Companion of the Order of the Bath; Colonial Auxiliary Forces Officers' Decoration; Mentioned in Despatches (4); Commander of the Legion of Honour (France)

Lieutenant General Sir James Whiteside McCay, KCMG, KBE, CB, VD (21 December 1864 – 1 October 1930), who often spelt his surname M'Cay, was an Australian general and politician.

A graduate of the University of Melbourne, where he earned Master of Arts and Master of Laws degrees, McCay established a successful legal practice, McCay & Thwaites. He was a member of the Victorian Parliament for Castlemaine from 1895 to 1899, where he was a champion of women's suffrage and federation. He lost his seat in 1899 but became a member of the first Australian Federal Parliament in 1901. He was Minister for Defence from 1904 to 1905, during which he implemented long-lasting reforms, including the creation of the Military Board.

As a soldier, McCay commanded the 2nd Infantry Brigade in the landing at Anzac Cove on 25 April 1915, during the Gallipoli Campaign of the Great War. He was later wounded in the Second Battle of Krithia and invalided to Australia, but returned to command the 5th Division, which he led in the Battle of Fromelles in 1916, dubbed "the worst 24 hours in Australia's entire history." His failures in difficult military operations made him a controversial figure who earned the disfavour of his superiors, while his efforts to succeed in the face of insurmountable obstacles earned him the odium of troops under his command, who blamed him for high casualties. In the latter part of the war he commanded the AIF Depots in the United Kingdom.

After the war, McCay resumed his old job as Deputy Chairman of the State Bank of Victoria and also served on a panel that deliberated on the future structure of the Army. He was chairman of the Fair Profits Commission, the War Service Homes Scheme of the Repatriation Commission, and the Repatriation Commission's Disposals Board. He commanded the Special Constabulary Force during the 1923 Victorian Police strike.

== Education and early life ==
James Whiteside McCay was born on 21 December 1864 in Ballynure, County Antrim, Ireland, the oldest of ten children to the Reverend Andrew Ross Boyd McCay, a Presbyterian minister, and his wife Lily Ann Esther Waring (née Brown). The family emigrated to Australia in 1865, settling in Castlemaine, Victoria. Boyd McCay continued his theological studies while he was a minister in Castlemaine, earning a Master of Arts (MA) from the University of Melbourne in 1882 and a Doctor of Divinity from the Presbyterian Theological Faculty Ireland in 1887. Esther could speak seven languages. The two separated in 1891.

James attended Castlemaine State School. At the age of twelve he won a scholarship to Scotch College, Melbourne to the value of £35 per annum for six years. He was dux of the school in 1880. At Scotch College McCay first met John Monash, who would be dux the following year, and would later become a close friend. McCay entered Ormond College at the University of Melbourne in 1881, the year that the college first opened, and commenced studying for his Bachelor of Arts (BA) degree. McCay left the university without completing his degree in 1883 and took a job as a teacher at Toorak Grammar School. In 1885, he bought Castlemaine Grammar School. The school was co-educational; McCay believed that girls should have the same opportunities as boys. Among its students who attended university with McCay's encouragement and support was Sussanah Jane Williams, who later became principal of Janet Clarke Hall at the University of Melbourne, and The Women's College at the University of Sydney. The job of running the school was soon delegated to McCay's mother and brother Adam.

He returned to the university in 1892 and completed his Bachelor of Arts degree. He then embarked on a Bachelor of Laws (LLB) degree. In 1895, he was awarded an MA degree, majoring in mathematics. He completed his law degree the next year, with first class honours, in spite of rarely attending the lectures due to his work, political and military commitments. In 1895, he was admitted as a barrister and solicitor of the Supreme Court of Victoria and established a legal practice in Castlemaine. His practice had the first telephone in the town. He was awarded his Master of Laws (LLM) degree in 1897. In 1898, he went into partnership with William Thwaites, whose brother Walter married his sister. The firm's name was then changed to McCay & Thwaites. It would later hire one of the first women to become an articled clerk in Victoria. On 8 April 1896, McCay married Julia Mary O'Meara, the daughter of a Roman Catholic Kyneton police magistrate. Sectarianism in Australia made such marriages uncommon, and the marriage was opposed by both their families. It produced two daughters, Margaret Mary ("Mardi") and Beatrix Waring ("Bixie"), born in 1897 and 1901, respectively.

== Political career ==
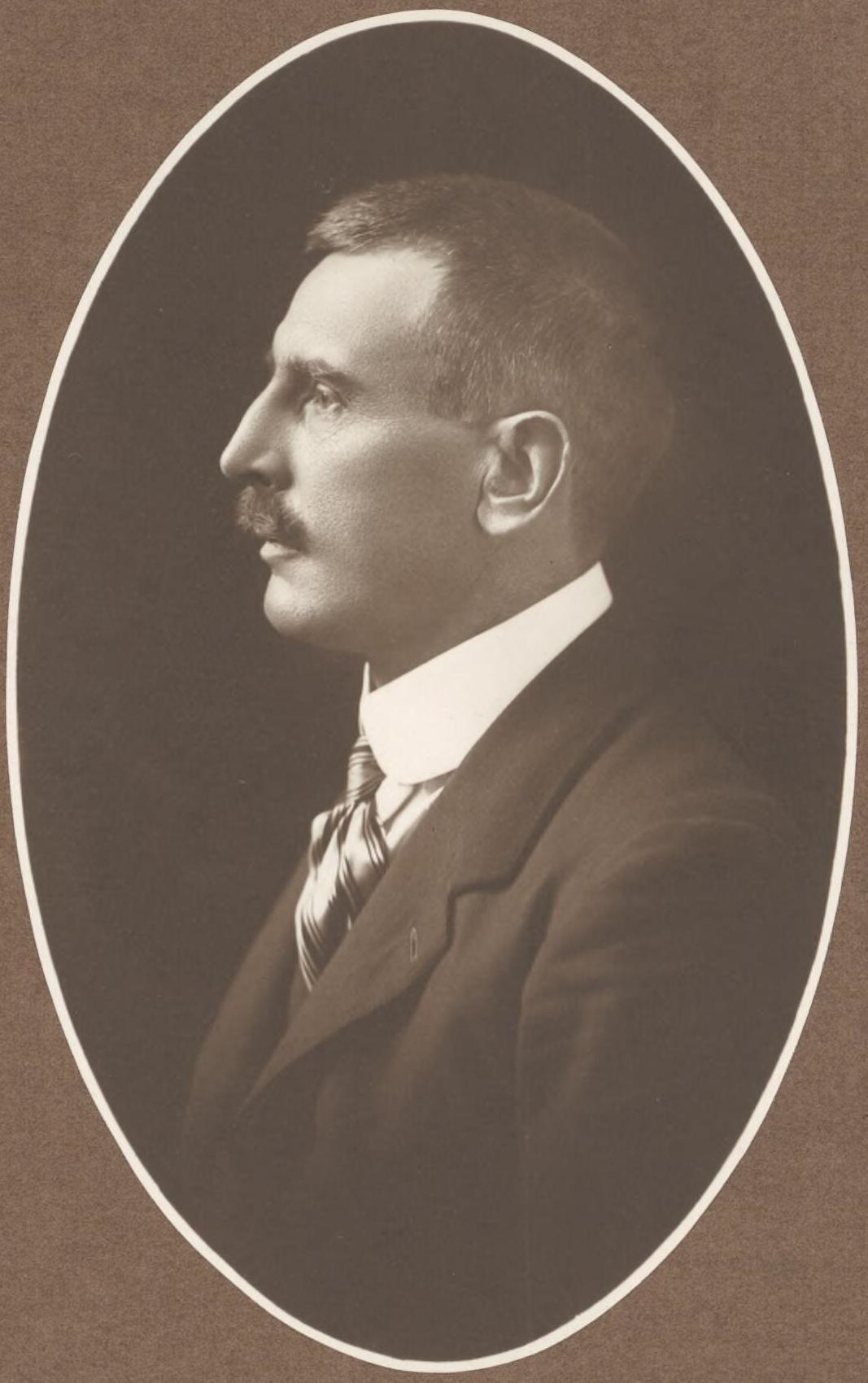
Undated photo

=== Victorian parliament ===
In August 1890, McCay was elected to the local council of the Castlemaine Borough. When the prominent local Member of the Legislative Assembly, Sir James Patterson, died in 1894, McCay ran for his seat of Castlemaine in the resulting by-election. After a hard-fought campaign, McCay won by just ten votes. McCay devoted his maiden speech to what would be his defining cause as a state politician, women's suffrage:

I believe the principle applies to woman by virtue of her citizenship as applies to man. As she has to bear her share of the duties of citizenship, she is entitled to vote unless good cause can be shown to the contrary; and I submit that good cause has not been shown to the contrary.

On other issues, McCay supported Federation, and was one of a number of young politicians who rallied around Alfred Deakin, threatening to bring down Sir George Turner's government if it attempted to block federation. McCay opposed sending Victorian troops to fight in the Boer War, calling war in general an "anachronism". In 1899, McCay was one of the young radicals who supported Allan McLean and crossed the floor to bring down the Turner government. McLean gave McCay the portfolio of Minister for Education and Customs in his new ministry. At the time it was the custom for members who had accepted a ministerial appointment to re-submit themselves for election. In the subsequent by-election, McCay's opposition to the war in South Africa became an election issue. The war was now going badly for Britain. Feelings ran high and McCay lost his seat. McCay attempted to win his seat back at the general election in 1900 but lost again.

=== Federal parliament ===
With Federation in 1901 came the opportunity to run for the new Parliament of Australia. McCay contested the 1901 election as a Protectionist Party candidate for Corinella, the Federal electorate that encompassed the Castlemaine area. McCay, who characterised himself as a liberal, supported the widest possible enfranchisement of women, the protection of industry and revenue through tariffs, and the White Australia policy. The war in South Africa was now in its final stages and the electorate forgot or forgave McCay's "treason", electing him to the first Australian Parliament.

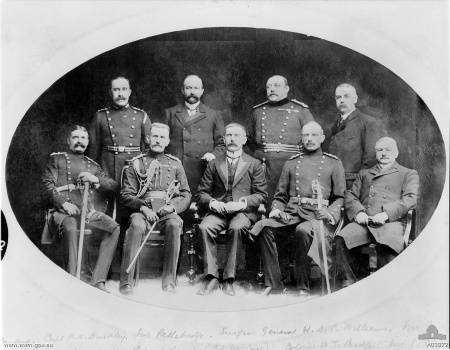
Group portrait of Commonwealth Headquarters Staff. Identified left to right, back row: Captain P. N. Buckley; Mr S. Petherbridge; Surgeon General W. D. C. Williams; Mr F. Savage. Front row: Colonel H. Le Mesurie; Colonel J. C. Hoad; Lieutenant Colonel J. W. McCay; Colonel W. T. Bridges, Mr J. A. Thompson.

As a backbencher, McCay opposed amendments to the Defence Act 1903 proposed by Billy Hughes of the Australian Labor Party that called for peacetime conscription. He accepted its necessity in wartime, but only for service within Australia. McCay believed that volunteers would always be plentiful, and he feared that peacetime conscription would result in militarism. He was re-elected unopposed in the 1903 election, the first in which Victorian women were eligible to vote. In 1904, McCay moved an amendment to the Conciliation and Arbitration Act 1904 to remove the clause that empowered the Commonwealth Court of Conciliation and Arbitration to give preference to trade unions. The debate became unexpectedly heated and resulted in the fall of Chris Watson's Labor government. The Free Trade Party's George Reid became Prime Minister and offered McCay the post of Minister for Defence.

McCay became the sixth Minister for Defence in four years. His predecessor, Senator Anderson Dawson, had chaired a committee that had produced a detailed report recommending the abolition of the post of general officer commanding Australian Military Forces and the creation of a Council of Defence, a Naval Board and a Military Board. It fell to McCay to implement the report's recommendations and create a five-man Military Board consisting of himself, a finance member and three military officers. McCay preferred the senior member not be styled the Chief of the General Staff. This change would not be made until 1909. At the first meeting of the Council of Defence, McCay rejected the arguments of Captain William Rooke Creswell for the majority of the defence budget to be spent on supporting the British fleet. In 1905 the Reid government collapsed and McCay became a backbencher once more. Since the Federal parliament sat in Parliament House, Melbourne, McCay lived at the Stock Exchange Club in Collins Street, Melbourne while his family remained in Castlemaine. He maintained a liaison with a married woman, Ella Gavan Duffy.

In the 1906 redistribution, McCay's electorate of Corinella was abolished and its territory divided between the electorates of Laanecoorie and Corio. McCay decided to run in Corio against the sitting member, Richard Crouch, although he was also a Protectionist, but Crouch won convincingly. In 1910, the Commonwealth Liberal Party Senate candidate, Thomas Skene, died suddenly two days before the nomination date for the 1910 election. McCay submitted himself as candidate but lost.

== Military career ==
McCay's military career began in 1884, when he enlisted in the 4th (Castlemaine) Battalion, Victorian Rifles. He was commissioned as a lieutenant on 29 October 1886, and was subsequently promoted to captain on 5 March 1889 and major on 13 March 1896. Following the forced resignation of the commander of the 8th Regiment for making a political speech touting McCay, McCay was promoted to lieutenant colonel and assumed command of the regiment on 12 January 1900.

=== Director of Military Intelligence ===
On 6 December 1907, on the recommendation of the Chief of Intelligence, Colonel William Throsby Bridges, the Minister for Defence, Thomas Ewing appointed McCay as Director of Military Intelligence, with the rank of colonel. In turn, McCay turned to his former schoolmate, John Monash, whom he had appointed to the command of the Victorian section of the new Australian Army Intelligence Corps (AIC), with a promotion to the rank of lieutenant colonel on 28 March 1908. The AIC set about compiling information such as the suitability of lighthouses for signalling, the availability of railway rolling stock, and the number of civilian motor vehicles suitable for military use. A concerted effort was put into creating sets of detailed maps. McCay and Monash became close friends. In 1912, McCay & Thwaites moved into offices at 360 Collins Street, where businesses associated with the Baillieu family were located. Monash moved his offices into the same building, and the two addressed each other as "Jack" and "Jim". On 5 March 1912, McCay was appointed a commissioner of the State Bank of Victoria.

In 1911, McCay delivered a lecture at the Victorian United Services Institution entitled "The True Principles of Australia's Defence". He suggested that the Australian Army should be equipped to the same standard as the British Army and should be prepared to fight an enemy overseas rather than waiting for an invasion of Australia. On 11 April 1913, he resigned his position as Director of Military Intelligence and was placed on the unattached list.

=== The Great War ===
==== Gallipoli ====
On 2 August 1914, the government activated the preliminary stage of the war plan, which included the establishment of censorship. McCay was recalled to duty as Deputy Chief Censor (Australia), answerable to the Chief Censor in London. McCay organised a headquarters in Melbourne, and established district offices in the other state capitals. Soon after the outbreak of the Great War on 4 August, Bridges, now a brigadier general, appointed McCay to command the 2nd Infantry Brigade of the Australian Imperial Force (AIF). He was succeeded by Lieutenant Colonel W. H. Tunbridge on 10 August, who in turn was succeeded by Colonel John Monash on 17 August.

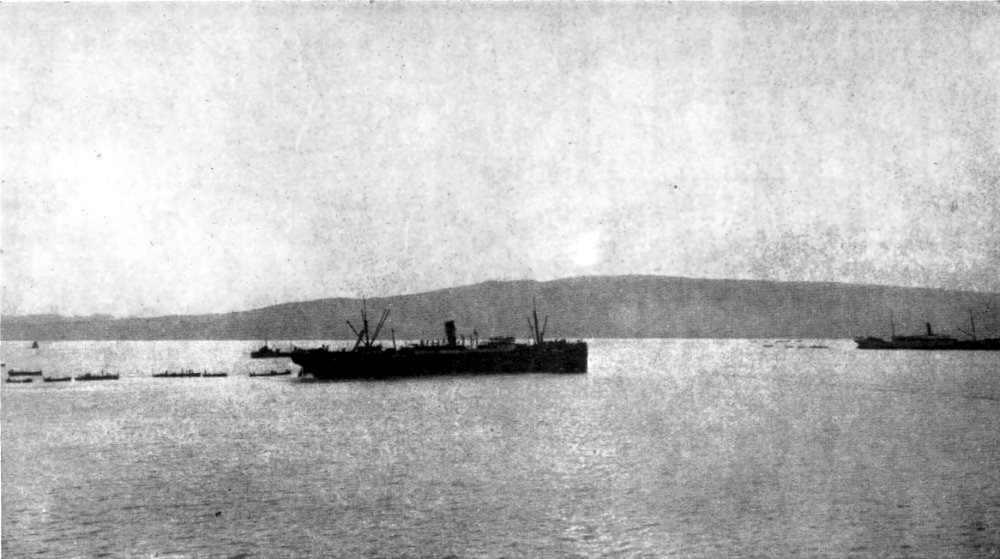
The sun rising over Chunuk Bair, Gallipoli peninsula, on the morning of 25 April 1915 during the landing at Anzac Cove. In the centre of the photo is SS Novian carrying the headquarters of the 2nd Infantry Brigade. At the right is the SS Galeka from which the brigade's 6th and 7th Infantry Battalions have been landing.

McCay was assigned two regular officers as his brigade major and staff captain, but was permitted to choose his four battalion commanders. All of McCay's choices were senior Militia commanders from Victoria. Three of them proved to be too old for the vigours of a modern campaign. The exception was his youngest appointment, Lieutenant Colonel Harold Elliott of the 7th Infantry Battalion, a University of Melbourne educated lawyer like himself. The brigade assembled at Broadmeadows Camp where it commenced its training. On 21 October McCay and his brigade headquarters embarked from Melbourne on the former P&O ocean liner RMS Orvieto, which also carried Major General Bridges and the staff of his 1st Division. After sailing through the Suez Canal, it arrived at Alexandria, Egypt on 4 December 1914. The brigade camped at Mena, on the outskirts of Cairo, where training resumed. War correspondent Charles Bean noted that McCay "trained his command with conspicuous ability. He did a great deal of detail work himself, drawing his own orders, and sometimes training his own platoons." On 4 April 1915, the 2nd Brigade packed its camp and moved by rail to Alexandria, from whence it embarked for Gallipoli for the landing at Anzac Cove.

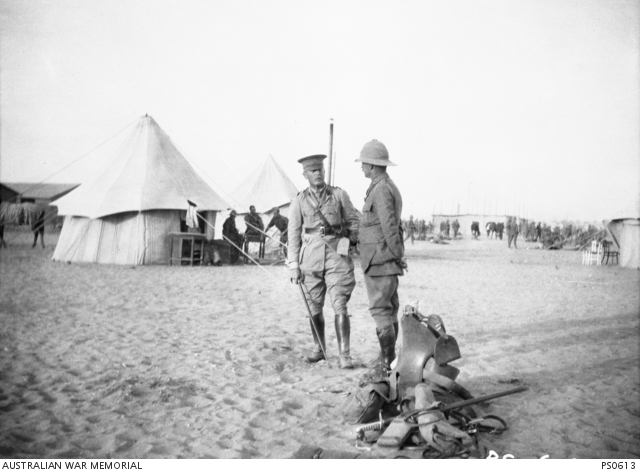
Colonel McCay (right, wearing pith helmet) in conversation with Colonel Ewen Sinclair-MacLagan (left), commanding the 3rd Brigade, pictured here in either 1914 or 1915.

McCay arrived off Anzac Cove on the transport SS Novian on the morning of Anzac Day, 25 April 1915, with his headquarters and the 5th Infantry Battalion on board. Novian had difficulties reaching her berth and when she finally reached it there were no boats to unload her. McCay therefore did not step ashore until about 06:00. There, he met Colonel Ewen Sinclair-MacLagan, the commander of the 3rd Infantry Brigade, who asked him to deploy the 2nd Infantry Brigade on the right, on the 400 Plateau, instead of the left as planned. McCay did so, establishing his headquarters on what became known as McCay's Hill. The 2nd Infantry Brigade was soon involved in "the most costly struggle of the day". At 16:45 McCay telephoned Bridges at 1st Division headquarters to ask for reinforcements.

The reply came from Colonel White: "The General has only one battalion left; MacLagan has been very hard pressed, and the General is loath to dispense with this battalion until other troops come ashore tonight."

McCay answered that he could not manage to bridge the gap in his line; unless reinforcements arrived, the Turks might come through it at any moment. Major Blamey, standing beside McCay, added that in his opinion the situation was very dangerous—that some of the men were giving way.

A few minutes later the voice of Bridges came to McCay through the telephone. "McCay," he said, "I want you to speak to me, not as subordinate to general, but as McCay to Bridges. I have only one battalion left. Do you assure me that your need for it is absolute?" McCay replied that he did; unless it were sent to him, the Turks could come in behind the right of the line. Bridges promised him the 4th Battalion, and ordered Blamey to come down and lead it up.

The Australian line was forced back on to the reverse slope, but did not break.

The commander of the Mediterranean Expeditionary Force, General Sir Ian Hamilton, now decided to make his main effort at Cape Helles. The Australian and New Zealand Army Corps commander, Lieutenant General Sir William Birdwood, was ordered to send a brigade from each of his two divisions to Helles to reinforce the British and French troops there. McCay's brigade and the New Zealand Infantry Brigade were chosen. They embarked for Helles on 6 May. On the evening of 8 May, during the Second Battle of Krithia, McCay was given 35 minutes notice to conduct an advance across open ground in broad daylight. McCay protested that there was insufficient time to organise this but was overruled by Hamilton. The brigade suffered heavily. McCay led his men from the front, driving them on despite the futility of the attack. All of his staff were killed or wounded, and McCay's leg was broken by a bullet. The advance was also pointless, for it could have been conducted after dark without loss. As a result, his men regarded him as responsible for their fate.

McCay was evacuated to hospital in Alexandria. He rejoined his brigade at Anzac on 8 June but the wound had not fully healed and he was lame, walking with the aid of a stick. In the meantime, General Bridges had been mortally wounded on 18 May and the Australian government sent the Chief of the General Staff, Major General James Gordon Legge, to replace him as commander of the 1st Division. McCay, Monash and Colonel Harry Chauvel were all disappointed at being passed over for the command, and protested to Birdwood and the Australian government, but to no avail. However, Legge chose McCay to command the 2nd Division, then forming in Egypt. Unfortunately, on 11 July, the day before he was due to leave for Egypt, McCay's leg snapped where the bone had been broken at Krithia. He was evacuated again, this time to Malta, and then to the United Kingdom, where he was visited by Sir George Reid, now the Australian High Commissioner to the United Kingdom. McCay's wife Julia died while he was in hospital. Several weeks later his father died as well. McCay was therefore sent back to Australia on compassionate leave. He arrived back in Melbourne on RMS Malwa on 11 November 1915, accompanied by his two teenage daughters and his brother Hugh, who had joined the ship in Adelaide, to a hero's welcome. For his service at Gallipoli, McCay was mentioned in despatches for his "great promptitude in supporting the threatened flank of the covering force" during the landing and his "conspicuous gallantry" at Krithia. He was also appointed a Companion of the Order of the Bath, and bestowed the Croix de Commander de la Légion d'honneur by the president of France. In addition he had, in July 1915, been promoted to the temporary rank of brigadier general, dated back to 15 August 1914.

==== Western Front ====
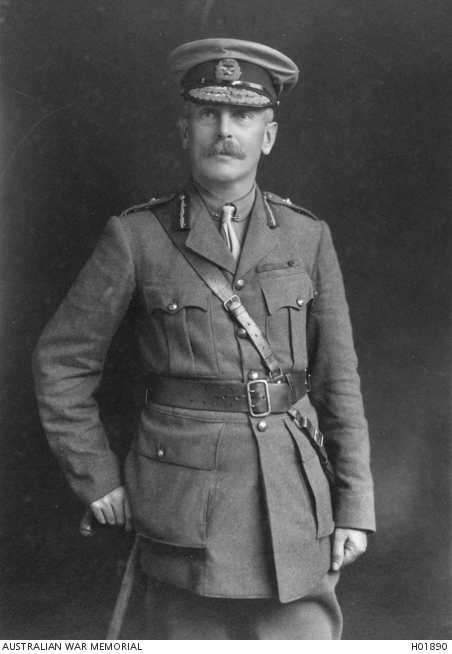
McCay, pictured here presumably during the First World War, in military uniform.

The minister for defence, Senator George Pearce, appointed McCay to the newly created post of inspector general of the AIF on 29 November 1915, with the local rank of major general. McCay was involved in recruiting campaigns, and inspected AIF units and reported on their training and equipment. He proposed a new training regime, with a national syllabus that increased the number of hours per week of training and the duration of training to twelve weeks. This led to strikes at the camps at Casula and Liverpool. Rioting soldiers clashed with police at Circular Quay and at Central Station striking soldiers were shot and one killed by soldiers sent to return them to Liverpool. As a result, new liquor laws were introduced, including six o'clock closing.

Meanwhile, the Gallipoli campaign had ended and the AIF in Egypt was in the process of doubling in size from two divisions to four. Birdwood wished to appoint two British generals to command the new divisions, but Senator Pearce opposed this, ordering that one be given to McCay. On 22 March 1916, McCay arrived back in Egypt to assume command of the 5th Division. He found that General Headquarters, Egyptian Expeditionary Force had ordered II Anzac Corps, of which the 5th Division was a part, to replace I Anzac Corps in the defence of the Suez Canal. Owing to a shortage of rolling stock, the 4th and 5th Divisions were ordered to undertake a three-day route march across the desert under service conditions, carrying their packs and weapons. This proved to be a greater test of staff and troops than anticipated, and many men dropped from thirst or exhaustion. Many of his men blamed McCay for subjecting them to such a humiliating and severe trial.

In June 1916, the 5th Division moved to the Western Front. Although the last to arrive in France, it would be the first to see serious action, a part of an ill-conceived plan by Lieutenant General Sir Richard Haking, whose British XI Corps would attack a strong part of the line with inexperienced 5th Division and British 61st (2nd South Midland) Division. The resulting Battle of Fromelles was an unmitigated disaster. In one night, the 5th Division sustained 5,533 casualties, while the 61st Division lost 1,547. Haking was principally responsible but McCay bore some of the blame. He made tactical errors: his failure to pass on Haking's cancellation orders led to the annihilation of the now-unsupported 58th's men before crossing the field, described by C.E.W. Bean as one of the bravest and most hopeless assaults ever undertaken by the Australian Imperial Force; his order to vacate the first trench after it was cleared "undoubtedly contributed to the causes of failure". His cancellation of a truce already in progress to recover wounded further damaged his popularity. For his part, McCay was mentioned in despatches a second time.

The 5th Division was out of action for some months. It finally moved with the rest of the I Anzac Corps to the Somme sector in October. After months of fighting and recent rain, the front line area was a devastated muddy morass. McCay was ordered to undertake an attack with the 2nd Division's 7th Infantry Brigade at Flers, which cost 819 casualties and gained no ground. Once again, McCay's handling of his division showed poor planning and tactics. Moreover, at Flers he showed that he had not learned from the lessons of Fromelles. His relief was now only a matter of time. Nonetheless, McCay remained in command of the 5th Division until 18 December 1916 when he was granted medical leave in the United Kingdom for treatment on his leg, which the doctors diagnosed as neuralgia. Birdwood took the opportunity of removing McCay, ostensibly on medical grounds. McCay was mentioned in despatches a third time.

==== United Kingdom ====
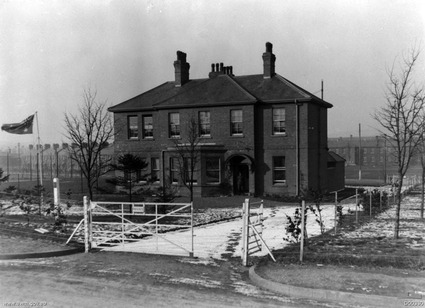
Exterior view of McCay's residence, at Bhurtpore Barracks, Tidworth, Wiltshire, England, as general officer commanding AIF Depots in England

On the recommendation of Brigadier General Robert Anderson, the commandant, Administrative Headquarters, AIF, and against the opposition of Birdwood, Senator Pearce appointed McCay as commander of the AIF Depots in the United Kingdom. These depots received and trained reinforcements arriving from Australia, and rehabilitated and retrained convalescents who were released from hospital. McCay established his headquarters at Tidworth, in the heart of the Salisbury Plain where most of the Australian camps were located. He occupied this post for the remainder of the war, failing in bids to return to an active command at the head of the 5th Division, the Australian Corps, or the 3rd Division when Monash was promoted to corps commander. A bid to replace Birdwood as administrative commander of the AIF also came to naught. For his services in the United Kingdom, McCay was mentioned in despatches a fourth time, made a Knight Commander of the Order of St Michael and St George in 1918, and a Knight Commander of the Order of the British Empire in 1919.

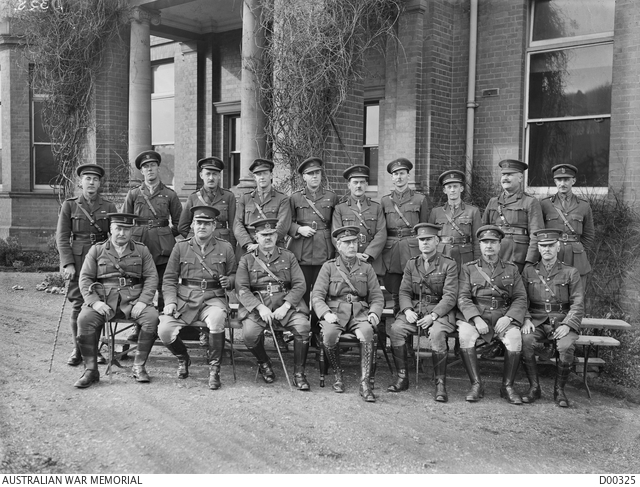
Group portrait of administrative officers attached to Headquarters AIF Depots in United Kingdom at Bhurtpore Barracks, March 1919. Lieutenant General McCay is sat in the centre of the front row.

On 10 March 1919, McCay handed over command of the AIF Depots in the United Kingdom to Major General Charles Rosenthal. After a farewell dinner hosted by Monash, he embarked for Australia, where his AIF appointment was terminated. In 1919, along with George Swinburne and Generals White and Legge, he produced a report on the organisation of the post-war Army. In 1920, he joined Generals Chauvel, White, Monash, Legge, and Hobbs to produce a second report on the subject. McCay retired from the Army in 1926 with the honorary rank of lieutenant general.

== Later life and death ==
McCay resumed his old job as deputy chairman of the State Savings Bank of Victoria on 10 June 1919, a few days after he returned to Melbourne. He also resumed his relationship with Ella Gavan Duffy. On 30 December 1919, the Premier of Victoria, Harry Lawson, McCay's successor in Legislative Assembly seat of Castlemaine and a former student at Castlemaine Grammar and Scotch College, appointed McCay as chairman of the Fair Profits Commission, a consumer protection body set up to monitor prices and profits. After his term ended in 1921, he was appointed to the advisory board of the War Service Homes Scheme of the Repatriation Commission. He was also chairman of its Disposals Board from 1921 to 1922. In 1922, the State Savings Bank of Victoria took over the construction of war service homes in Victoria. During the 1923 Victorian Police strike, Monash appointed McCay to create, and later command the Special Constabulary Force that was established to carry out police duties during the strike. McCay ran this organisation from the Melbourne Town Hall, and later the Repatriation Department offices, which were made available rent free by the Commonwealth Government. The Special Constabulary Force was wound up in May 1924.

McCay's daughter Mardi matriculated from Sacré Cœur School in 1914 and earned Master of Arts and Diploma of Education degrees from the University of Melbourne. In 1922, she entered the Society of the Sacred Heart. She taught at Convent of the Sacred Heart, Rose Bay in Sydney (now Kincoppal-Rose Bay) until 1956 when she returned to Sacré Cœur as mistress of studies. Bixie also attended Sacré Cœur and the University of Melbourne, at Janet Clarke Hall, where she became only the third woman in Victoria to earn a Master of Laws degree, and was enrolled as a barrister on 10 June 1925. Like Joan Rosanove, she could not obtain room in the Selborne Chambers, as women were not allowed to do so, so she put up her plate in the building next door. McCay followed his daughter and became a barrister, enrolling on 8 October 1925. In 1930, she married George Reid, a young barrister who later became Attorney-General of Victoria.

McCay became ill in 1930 with cancer. In his last months he destroyed all his papers. He died on 12 October 1930. He was given, at his request, a non-military funeral at Cairns Memorial Presbyterian Church in East Melbourne, and was buried at Box Hill Cemetery. For pallbearers he had generals John Monash, Harold Elliott, Cecil Henry Foott, R. E. Williams, and J. Stanley, along with Sir William McBeath, the chairman of the State Savings Bank; William Thwaites, his law partner; and businessman A. S. Baillieu. Among the other mourners was Generals Brudenell White and John Patrick McGlinn, who had been his deputy commander of AIF Depots in the United Kingdom; John Latham, the Leader of the Opposition; Dr W. S. Littlejohn, the headmaster of Scotch College and Sir John MacFarland, the Chancellor of the University of Melbourne.

== Legacy ==
McCay is a controversial figure in Australian history. Disagreement about his significance and reputation began before his death and continues to the present. General Sir Brudenell White considered McCay to be "one of the greatest soldiers that ever served Australia, greater even than Monash." McCay's achievements included the creation of the Military Board and the Australian Army Intelligence Corps, and the development of the Staff Corps, "laying the foundations on which the Australian Army was built." In writing Volume III of the Official History of Australia in the War of 1914–1918, which covered 1916, official historian Charles Bean exonerated McCay of blame for Fromelles. This led to a public debate in the pages of The Bulletin in 1929 between critics of McCay and his defenders, led by Elliott. A revival of interest in Australian military history and the rediscovery of graves at Fromelles in the 21st Century led to a number of books being written about the battle, which tended to be critical of McCay.

== Notes ==
Parliament of Victoria
Preceded by Sir James Patterson	Member for Castlemaine; 1895–1899	Succeeded by Sir Harry Lawson
Parliament of Australia
New division	Member for Corinella; 1901–1906	Division abolished
Political offices
Preceded by Anderson Dawson	Minister for Defence; 1904–1905	Succeeded by Thomas Playford
