= Thomas Blamey =

Australian army general (1884–1951)

Field Marshal Sir Thomas Blamey GBE KCB CMG DSO CStJ ED
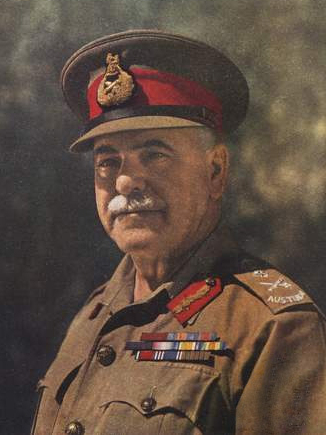
- Formal portrait, c. 1942
- Born: 24 January 1884; Wagga Wagga, Colony of New South Wales
- Died: 27 May 1951 (aged 67); Heidelberg, Victoria, Australia
- Burial place: Fawkner Memorial Park, Victoria
- Military career
- Allegiance: Australia
- Branch: Australian Army
- Service years: 1906–1950
- Rank: Field marshal
- Service number: VX1 (2nd AIF)
- Commands: Allied Land Forces, South West Pacific Area (1942–1945); Australian Military Forces (1942–1945); I Corps (1940–1941); 6th Division (1939–1940); 3rd Division (1931–1937); 10th Brigade (1926–1931)
- Conflicts: First World War; Gallipoli campaign; Battle of the Somme; Battle of Pozières; Battle of Hamel; Hundred Days Offensive; Battle of Amiens; Battle of St Quentin Canal; Second World War; Battle of Greece; Battle of Crete; Syria–Lebanon campaign; New Guinea Campaign; Kokoda Track campaign; Battle of Milne Bay; Finisterre Range campaign; Operation Cartwheel; Salamaua–Lae campaign; Bougainville campaign; New Britain campaign; Borneo campaign; Occupation of Japan
- Awards: Knight Grand Cross of the Order of the British Empire; Knight Commander of the Order of the Bath; Knight Bachelor; Companion of the Order of St Michael and St George; Distinguished Service Order; Mentioned in Despatches (8); Efficiency Decoration

10th Chief Commissioner of Victoria Police
- In office 1 September 1925 – 9 July 1936
- Monarchs: George V; Edward VIII
- Governor: The Earl of Stradbroke; The Lord Somers; The Lord Huntingfield
- Preceded by: Alexander Nicholson
- Succeeded by: Alexander Duncan

Field Marshal Sir Thomas Albert Blamey (24 January 1884 – 27 May 1951) was an Australian general of the First and Second World Wars. He is the only Australian to attain the rank of field marshal.

Blamey joined the Australian Army as a regular soldier in 1906 and attended the Staff College at Quetta. During the First World War, he participated in the landing at Anzac Cove on 25 April 1915, and served as a staff officer in the Gallipoli campaign, where he was mentioned in despatches for a daring raid behind enemy lines. He later served on the Western Front, where he distinguished himself in the planning for the Battle of Pozières. He rose to the rank of brigadier general. He served as chief of staff of the Australian Corps under Lieutenant General Sir John Monash, who credited him as a factor in the Corps' success in the Battle of Hamel, the Battle of Amiens and the Battle of the Hindenburg Line.

After the war, Blamey became the Deputy Chief of the General Staff, and was involved in the creation of the Royal Australian Air Force. He resigned from the regular Army in 1925 to become Chief Commissioner of the Victoria Police. Still, he remained in the Militia, rising to command the 3rd Division in 1931. As chief commissioner, Blamey set about dealing with the grievances that had led to the 1923 Victorian police strike, and implemented innovations such as police dogs and equipping vehicles with radios. His tenure as chief commissioner was marred by a scandal in which his police badge was found in a brothel, and a later attempt to cover up the shooting of a police officer led to his forced resignation in 1936.

During the Second World War, Blamey commanded the Second Australian Imperial Force and the I Corps in the Middle East. In the latter role, he commanded Australian and Commonwealth troops in the disastrous Battle of Greece. He attempted to protect Australian interests against British commanders who sought to disperse his forces. He was appointed deputy commander-in-chief of Middle East Command, and was promoted to general in 1941. In 1942, he returned to Australia as commander-in-chief of the Australian Military Forces and commander of Allied Land Forces in the South West Pacific Area under American General Douglas MacArthur. On the orders of MacArthur and Prime Minister John Curtin, he assumed personal command of New Guinea Force during the Kokoda Track campaign, and relieved Lieutenant General Sydney Rowell under controversial circumstances. He planned and carried out the significant and victorious Salamaua–Lae campaign but during the final campaigns of the war, he faced criticism of the Army's performance. He signed the Japanese Instrument of Surrender on behalf of Australia at Japan's ceremonial surrender in Tokyo Bay on 2 September 1945, and personally accepted the Japanese surrender on Morotai on 9 September.

== Early life ==
The seventh of ten children, Blamey was born on 24 January 1884 in Lake Albert, near Wagga Wagga, New South Wales. He was the son of Richard Blamey, a farmer who had emigrated from Cornwall at the age of 16 in 1862, and his Australian-born wife, Margaret (née Murray). After farming failures in Queensland and on the Murrumbidgee River near Wagga Wagga, his father Richard moved to a small 8.1-hectare (20-acre) property in Lake Albert, where he supplemented his farm income working as a drover and shearing overseer.

Blamey acquired the bush skills associated with his father's enterprises and became a sound horseman. He attended Wagga Wagga Superior Public School (now Wagga Wagga Public School), where he played Australian football, and was a keen member of the Army Cadet unit. He transferred to Wagga Wagga Grammar when he was 13, and was head cadet of its unit for two years.

Blamey began his working life in 1899 as a trainee school teacher at Lake Albert School. He transferred to South Wagga Public School in 1901, and in 1903 moved to Western Australia, where he taught for three years at Fremantle Boys' School. He coached the cadets' rifle shooting team to a win in the Western Australian Cup. He was raised in the Methodist faith and remained involved with his church. By early 1906, he was a lay preacher, and church leaders in Western Australia offered him an appointment as an associate minister in Carnarvon, Western Australia.

== Early military career ==
With the creation of the Cadet Instructional Staff of the Australian Military Forces, Blamey saw a new opportunity. He sat the exam and came third in Australia, but failed to secure an appointment as there were no vacancies in Western Australia. After correspondence with the military authorities, he persuaded the Deputy Assistant Adjutant General, Major Julius Bruche, that he should be given the option of taking up an appointment for one of the vacancies in another state. He was appointed to a position in Victoria with the rank of lieutenant, commencing duty in November 1906 with responsibility for school cadets in Victoria, and was confirmed in his rank and appointment the following 29 June.

In Melbourne, Blamey met Minnie Millard, the daughter of a Toorak stockbroker who was involved in the Methodist Church there. They were married at her home on 8 September 1909. His first child was born on 29 June 1910 and named Charles Middleton after a friend of Blamey's who had died in a shooting accident; but the boy was always called Dolf by his family. A second child, a boy named Thomas, was born four years later.

Blamey was promoted to captain on 1 December 1910, and became brigade major of the 12th Brigade Area. He then set his sights on attending staff college. There were two British staff colleges, at Camberley in England and Quetta in India, and from 1908, one position was set aside for the Australian Army each year. No Australian officers managed to pass the demanding entrance examinations, but this requirement was waived to allow them to attend. In 1911, Blamey became the first Australian officer to pass the entrance examination. He commenced his studies at Quetta in 1912, and performed very well, completing the course in December 1913.

The usual practice was for Australian staff college graduates to follow their training with a posting to a British Army or British Indian Army headquarters. He was initially attached to the 4th Battalion, King's Royal Rifle Corps at Rawalpindi, and then the staff of the Kohat Brigade on the North-West Frontier. Finally, he was assigned to the General Staff at Army Headquarters at Shimal. In May 1914, he was sent to Britain for more training, while his family returned home to Australia. He visited Turkey (including the Dardanelles), Belgium, and the battlefields of the Franco-Prussian War en route. In England, he spent a brief time on attachment to the 4th Dragoon Guards at Tidworth before taking up duties on the staff of the Wessex Division, at that time entering its annual camp. On 1 July 1914, he was promoted to major.

== First World War ==
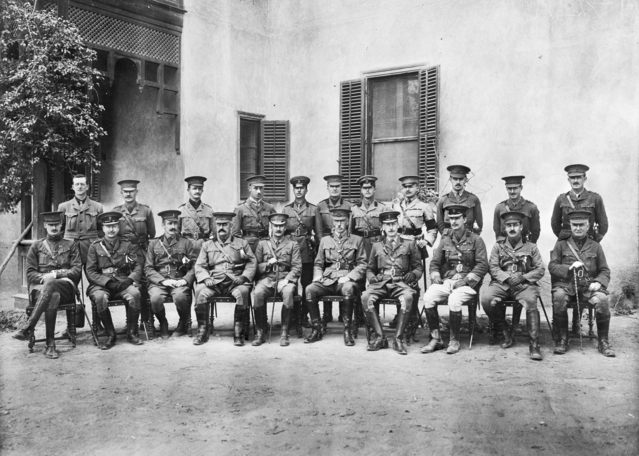
Group portrait of 1st Division staff officers at Mena Camp, December 1914. Blamey, then a major, is in the front row, second from the right.

Following the outbreak of the First World War in August 1914, Blamey was transferred to the War Office, where he worked in the Intelligence Branch preparing daily summaries for the King and the Secretary of State for War, Lord Kitchener. Fully trained staff officers were rare and valuable in the Australian Army, and while still in Britain, Blamey was appointed to the Australian Imperial Force (AIF) as general staff officer, Grade 3 (Intelligence), on the staff of Major General William Bridges's 1st Division. As such, he reported to the 1st Division's GSO1, Lieutenant Colonel Brudenell White. In November 1914 he sailed for Egypt with Colonel Harry Chauvel, to join the Australian contingent there. His appointment as GSO 3 was confirmed with effect from 10 December.

=== Gallipoli ===
Along with Bridges, White, and other members of 1st Division headquarters, Blamey left the battleship HMS Prince of Wales in a trawler and landed on the beach at Anzac Cove at 07:20 on 25 April 1915. He was sent to evaluate the need for reinforcements by Colonel James McCay's 2nd Brigade on the 400 Plateau. He confirmed that they were needed, and the reinforcements were sent.

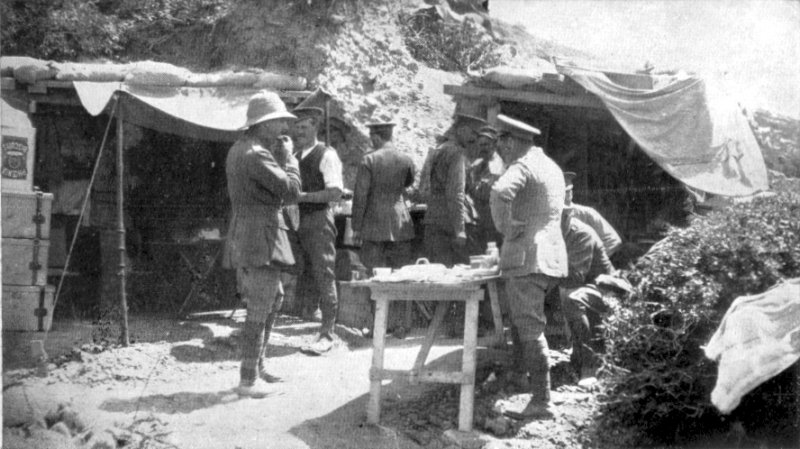
1st Division Headquarters at Anzac, 3 May 1915. Blamey is in the right foreground with his back to the camera. The position was exposed to shrapnel fire and Major John Gellibrand was wounded there.

On the night of 13 May 1915, Blamey, in his capacity as 1st Division intelligence officer, led a patrol consisting of himself, Sergeant J. H. Will and Bombardier A. A. Orchard, behind the Turkish lines in an effort to locate the Olive Grove guns that had been harassing the beach. Near Pine Ridge, an enemy party of eight Turks approached; when one of them went to bayonet Orchard, Blamey shot the Turk with his revolver. In the action that followed, six Turks were killed. He withdrew his patrol back to the Australian lines without locating the guns. For this action, he was mentioned in despatches.

Blamey was always interested in technical innovation, and was receptive to unorthodox ideas. He was instrumental in the adoption of the periscope rifle at Gallipoli, a device which he saw during an inspection of the front line. He arranged for the inventor, Lance Corporal W. C. B. Beech, to be seconded to division headquarters to develop the idea. Within a few days, the design was perfected and periscope rifles began to be used throughout the Australian trenches.

On 21 July 1915 Blamey was given a staff appointment as a general staff officer, Grade 2 (GSO2), with the temporary rank of lieutenant-colonel. and with effect from 2 August joined the staff of the newly formed 2nd Division in Egypt as its assistant adjutant and quartermaster general (AA&QMG) – the senior administrative officer of the division. Its commander, Major General James Gordon Legge, preferred to have an Australian colonel in this post as he felt that a British officer might not take such good care of the troops. The 2nd Division Headquarters embarked for Gallipoli on 29 August 1915, but Blamey was forced to remain in Egypt as he had just had an operation for haemorrhoids. He finally returned to Anzac on 25 October 1915, remaining for the rest of the campaign.

=== Western Front ===
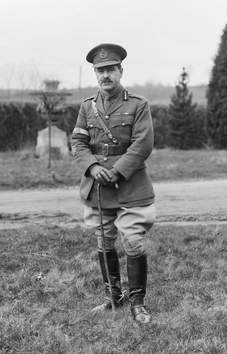
Blamey in Belgium, March 1919

After the Australian forces moved to the Western Front in 1916, Blamey returned to the 1st Division as GSO1 on 10 July. At the Battle of Pozières, he developed the plan of attack which captured the town, for which he received another mention in despatches, and was awarded the Distinguished Service Order in the 1917 New Year Honours.

He was considered a possible brigade commander, but he had never commanded a battalion, which was usually regarded as a prerequisite for brigade command. He was therefore appointed to command the 2nd Infantry Battalion on 3 December 1916. On 28 December, Blamey, as senior ranking battalion commander, took over as acting commander of the 1st Infantry Brigade. On 9 January 1917, he went on leave, handing over command to Lieutenant Colonel Iven Mackay. However, when General Headquarters (GHQ) BEF found out about this use of a staff college graduate, it reminded I ANZAC Corps that "it is inadvisable to release such officers for command of battalions unless they have proved to be unequal to their duties on staff".

Blamey therefore returned to 1st Division Headquarters. Lieutenant General Sir William Birdwood did, however, promote Blamey to full colonel, backdated to 1 December 1916, thereby making him technically senior to several recently promoted brigadier generals, that rank being only held temporarily. His division commander, Major General H. B. Walker, had Blamey mentioned in despatches for this period of battalion and brigade command, although the battalion had spent most of the time out of the line and there had been no significant engagements. Blamey was also acting commander of the 2nd Brigade during a rest period from 27 August to 4 September 1917.

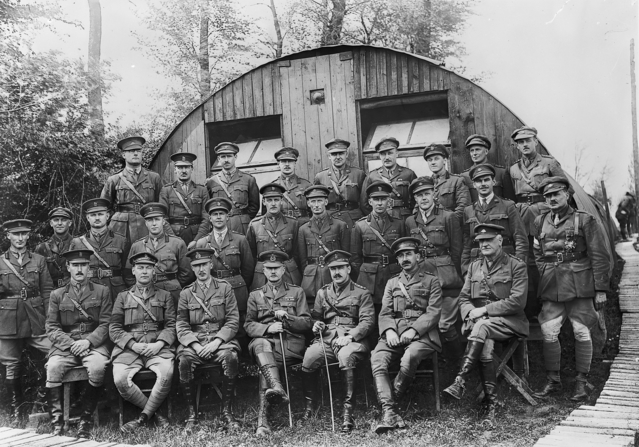
Group portrait of the staff of the 1st Australian Division, outside a Nissen hut somewhere in France, May 1918. The division's GOC, Major General Sir Harold Walker, is sat in the front row, fourth from the left, with his GSO1, Thomas Blamey, sitting to his left.

On 8 September, he was hospitalised with vomiting and coughing. He was sent to England where he was admitted to the 3rd London General Hospital for treatment for debilitating psoriasis on 22 September, and did not return to duty until 8 November 1917, by which time he had been promoted to brevet lieutenant-colonel on 24 September. He was made a Companion of St Michael and St George in the 1918 New Year's list, and received another mention in despatches in May 1918.

On 1 June 1918, Lieutenant General John Monash succeeded Birdwood as commander of the Australian Corps, and Blamey was promoted to the rank of brigadier general to replace White as the corps' Brigadier General General Staff (BGGS). He played a significant role in the success of the Australian Corps in the final months of the war. He remained interested in technological innovation. He was impressed by the capabilities of the new models of tanks and pressed for their use in the Battle of Hamel, where they played an important part in the success of the battle. Monash acknowledged Blamey's role in the Australian Corps' success in the Battle of Amiens in August and the Battle of the Hindenburg Line in September.

The Major General General Staff (MGGS) of the British Fourth Army, of which the Australian Corps was a part during these battles, Major General Archibald Montgomery-Massingberd, was a former instructor of Blamey's at Quetta. He declared himself "full of admiration for the staff work of the Australian Corps." Monash later wrote:

No reference to the staff work of the Australian Corps during the period of my command would be complete without a tribute to the work and personality [of] Brigadier General T. A. Blamey, my Chief of Staff. He possessed a mind cultured far above the average, widely informed, alert and prehensile. He had [an] infinite capacity for taking pains. A Staff College graduate, but not on that account a pedant, he was thoroughly versed in the technique of staff work, and in the minutiae of all procedure.

He served me with an exemplary loyalty, for which I owe a debt of gratitude which cannot be repaid. Our temperaments adapted themselves to each other in a manner which was ideal. He had an extraordinary faculty for self-effacement, posing always and conscientiously as the instrument to give effect [to] my policies and decisions. Really helpful whenever his advice was invited, he never obtruded his own opinions, although I knew that he did not always agree with me.

Blamey's loyalty to Monash would continue after the latter's death in 1931. For his services as Corps Chief of Staff, Blamey was appointed Companion of the Order of the Bath in 1919, mentioned in despatches twice more, and was awarded the French Croix de guerre.

== Inter-war years ==
=== General staff ===
Blamey arrived back in Australia on 20 October 1919, after an absence of seven years, and became director of Military Operations at Army Headquarters in Melbourne. His AIF appointment was terminated on 19 December 1919 and on 1 January 1920, he was simultaneously confirmed in the rank of lieutenant-colonel and promoted to substantive colonel, also receiving the honorary rank of brigadier-general, with effect from 1 June 1918. In May 1920, he was appointed Deputy Chief of the General Staff.

His first major task was the creation of the Royal Australian Air Force (RAAF). The government established a joint Army–Navy board to provide recommendations on the matter, with Blamey and Lieutenant Colonel Richard Williams as the Army representatives. Blamey supported the creation of a separate air force, albeit one still subordinate to the Army and Navy. He refused to yield, however, on his opposition to the Navy's demand that Lieutenant Colonel Stanley Goble become its first chief.

In November 1922, Blamey embarked for London to be the Australian representative on the Imperial General Staff. He reported that the "conception of an Imperial General Staff ... was absolutely dead". The British Army saw little use in the concept of a combined staff which could coordinate the defence of the British Empire. He became involved with the development of the Singapore strategy, and he briefed Prime Minister Stanley Bruce on it for the 1923 Imperial Conference, at which it was formally adopted. Even in 1923, though, Blamey was sceptical about the strategy.

When White retired as Chief of General Staff in 1923, Blamey was widely expected to succeed him, because he had done so as chief of staff of the Australian Corps in France, but there were objections from more senior officers at being passed over, particularly Major General Victor Sellheim. Instead, the Inspector General, Lieutenant General Sir Harry Chauvel, was made Chief of General Staff as well, while Blamey was given the new post of Second CGS, in which he performed most of the duties of Chief of General Staff.

Seeing no immediate prospects for advancement, Blamey transferred from the Permanent Military Forces to the Militia on 1 September 1925. For the next 14 years, he would remain in the Army as a part-time soldier. On 1 May 1926, he assumed command of the 10th Infantry Brigade, part of the 3rd Division. Blamey stepped up to command the 3rd Division on 23 March 1931 and was promoted to major general, one of only four Militia officers promoted to that rank between 1929 and 1939. In 1937, he was transferred to the unattached list.

=== Chief Commissioner of the Victoria Police ===
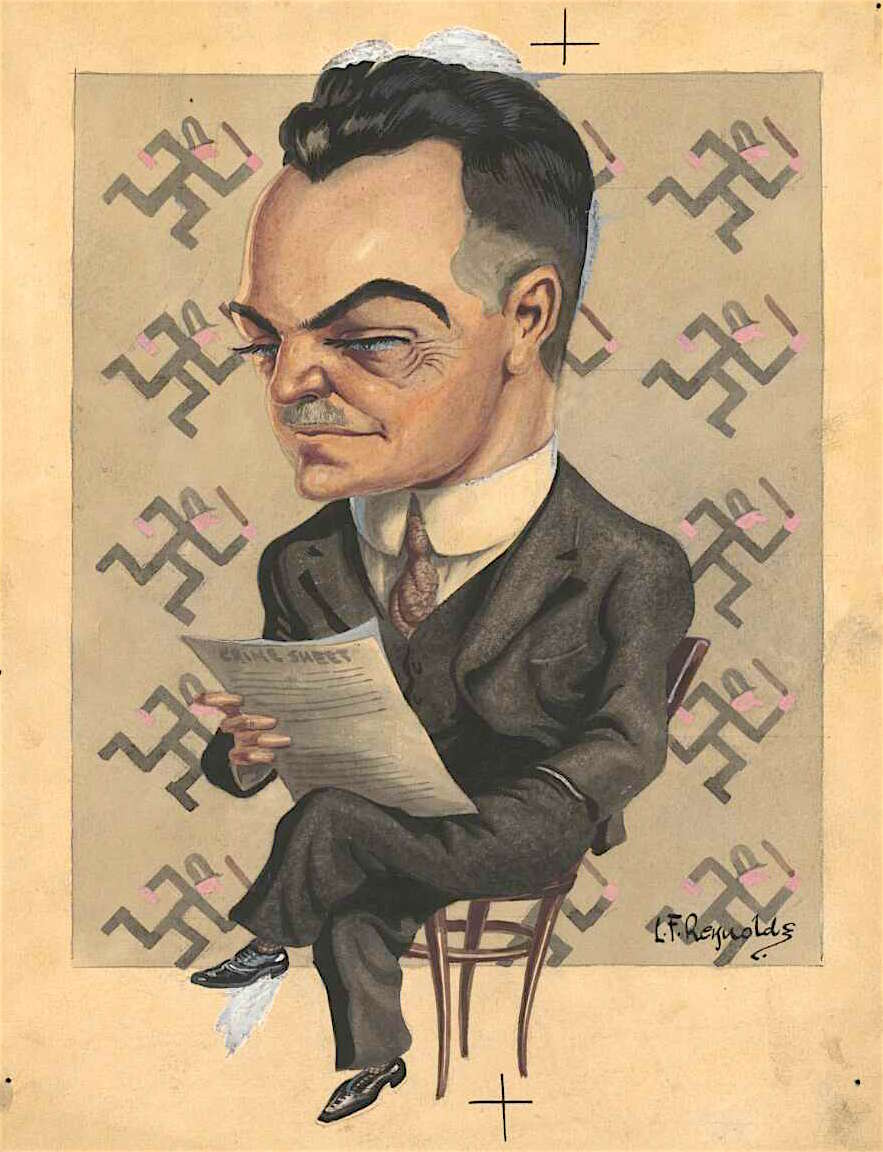
Caricature of Blamey by Len Reynolds, published in 1926

In 1923, the Victoria Police went on strike, and Monash and McCay established a Special Constabulary Force to carry out police duties. After the Chief Commissioner, Alexander Nicholson, resigned due to ill-health in 1925, Chauvel recommended Blamey for the post. Blamey became Chief Commissioner on 1 September 1925, for a five-year term, with a salary of £A 1,500 per annum, equivalent to A$138,009 in 2022.

Blamey set about addressing the grievances that had caused the strike, which he felt "were just, even if they went the wrong way about them". Blamey improved pay and conditions, and implemented the recommendations of the Royal Commission into the strike. He attempted to introduce faster promotion based on merit, but this was unpopular with the Police Association, and was abandoned by his successors.

As in the Army, he showed a willingness to adopt new ideas. He introduced police dogs, and increased the number of police cars equipped with two-way radios from one in 1925 to five in 1930. He also boosted the number of policewomen on the force.

Blamey became involved in his first and greatest scandal soon after taking office. During a raid on a brothel in Fitzroy on 21 October 1925, the police encountered a man who produced Blamey's police badge, No. 80. Blamey later said that he had given his key ring, which included his badge, to a friend who had served with him in France, so that the man could help himself to some alcohol in Blamey's locker at the Naval and Military Club. His story was corroborated by his friend Stanley Savige, who was with him at the time. Blamey protected the man in question, who he said was married with children, and refused to identify him. The man has never been identified, but the description given by the detectives and the brothel owner did not match Blamey.

During the 1920s, Victoria had repressive and restrictive drinking laws, including the notorious six o'clock closing. Blamey took the position that it was the job of the police to enforce the laws, even if they did not support them. Many members of the public did not agree with this attitude, maintaining that the police should not uphold such laws. Almost as controversially, Blamey drew a sharp distinction between his personal life and his job. His presence in a hotel after closing time was always welcome, as it meant that drinking could continue, for it was known that it would not be raided while he was there; but other citizens felt that it was unjust when they were arrested for breaking the same laws.

As Police Commissioner Blamey defended the actions of the police during the 1928 Waterside Workers' Federation dispute, during which police opened fire, killing a striking worker who was also a Gallipoli veteran, and wounding several others. His treatment of the unionists was typical of his hard-line anti-communist beliefs, and as such, his relations with left-wing governments were tense.

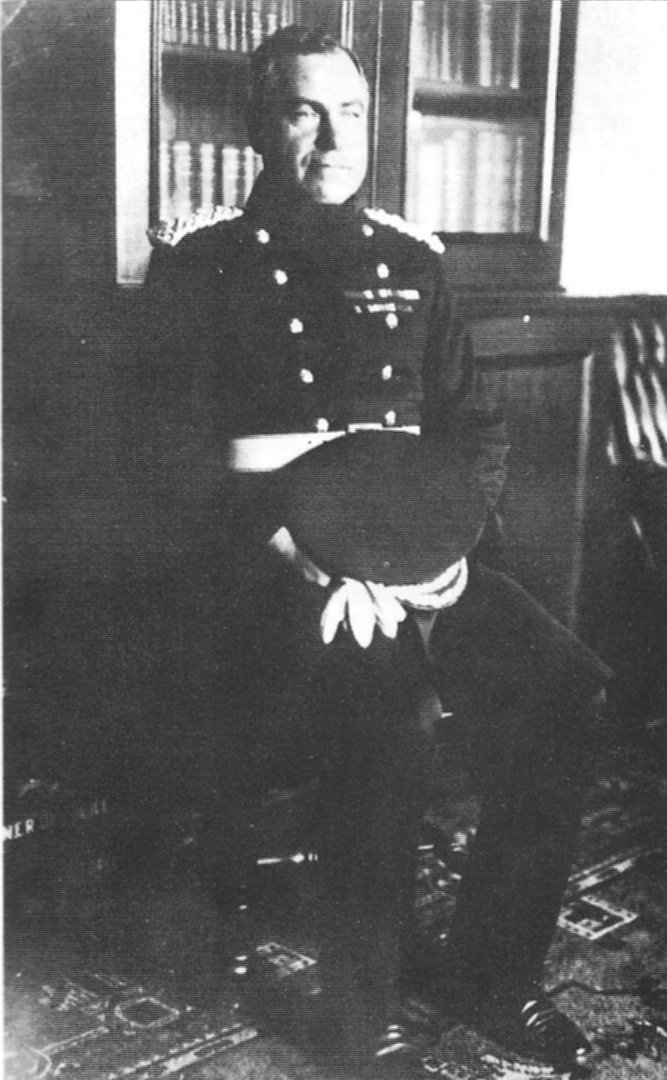
Blamey as Chief Commissioner of the Victoria Police

Blamey was re-appointed as Chief Commissioner in 1930 but at a reduced salary of £A 1,250 per annum, equivalent to A$116,331 in 2022. A year later it was reduced still further, to £A 785, equivalent to A$81,484 in 2022, due to cutbacks as a result of the Great Depression. His wife, Minnie, became an invalid, and by 1930 no longer accompanied him in public. His son Dolf, now an RAAF flying officer, was killed in an air crash at RAAF Base Richmond in October 1932, and Minnie died in October 1935. Blamey was knighted in the 1935 New Year Honours, and in 1936 he was appointed a Commander of the Venerable Order of Saint John.

A second scandal occurred in 1936 when Blamey attempted to cover up details of the shooting of the superintendent of the Criminal Investigation Branch, John O'Connell Brophy, whom Blamey had appointed to the post. The story put about was that Brophy had taken two women friends and a chauffeur along with him to a meeting with a police informant. While they were waiting for the informant, they had been approached by armed bandits, and Brophy had opened fire and had himself been wounded. In order to cover up the identities of the two women involved, Blamey initially issued a press release to the effect that Brophy had accidentally shot himself (three times). The Premier, Albert Dunstan, gave Blamey the choice of resigning or being dismissed. The latter meant the loss of pension rights and any future prospects of employment in the Public Service or the Army. He reluctantly submitted his resignation on 9 July 1936.

=== Other activities and marriage ===
From March 1938, Blamey supplemented his income by making weekly broadcasts on international affairs on Melbourne radio station 3UZ under the pseudonym "the Sentinel". Like the station's general manager, Alfred Kemsley, Blamey felt that Australians were poorly informed about international affairs, and set about raising awareness of matters that he believed would soon impact them greatly.

He was appalled at Nazi Germany's persecution of Jews, and saw a clear and growing menace to world peace from both Germany and the Empire of Japan. His 15-minute weekly talks continued until the end of September 1939, by which time the war that he had warned was coming had started.

On 5 April 1939, he married Olga Ora Farnsworth, a 35-year-old fashion artist, at St John's Anglican Church, Toorak.

=== League of National Security ===
Blamey was leader of the clandestine far-right League of National Security, also known as the "White Army", described as a fascist paramilitary group. The group, which existed for about eight years from 1931, comprised several senior army officers, including Colonel Francis Derham, a Melbourne lawyer, and Lieutenant Colonel Edmund Herring, later Chief Justice of Victoria.

Some members had been members of the New South Wales-based New Guard, and both groups were involved in street fights with leftist groups. This was reportedly a response to the rise of communism in Australia. Its members stood ready to take up arms to stop a Catholic or communist revolution.

=== Manpower Committee and militia recruiting ===
In November 1938, Blamey was appointed chairman of the Commonwealth Government's Manpower Committee and Controller General of Recruiting. As such, he laid the foundation for the expansion of the Army in the event of war with Germany or Japan, which he now regarded as inevitable. He headed a successful recruiting campaign which doubled the size of the part-time volunteer Militia from 35,000 in September 1938 to 70,000 in March 1939.

Henry Somer Gullett and Richard Casey, who had served with Blamey at Gallipoli and in France, put Blamey's name forward to Prime Minister Joseph Lyons as a possible commander in chief in the event of a major war. "We've got some brilliant staff officers", Casey told Lyons, "but Blamey is a commander. That's the difference."

Lyons initially had concerns about Blamey's morals, but Casey and Lyons summoned Blamey to a meeting in Canberra, after which Lyons designated him for the job. Lyons died on 7 April 1939, and was replaced as prime minister by Robert Menzies, another prominent supporter of Blamey's. Two other officers, Major Generals Gordon Bennett and John Lavarack, were considered, and also had strong and well-connected supporters, but unlike Blamey, they were public critics of the government's defence policies.

== Second World War ==
=== Middle East ===
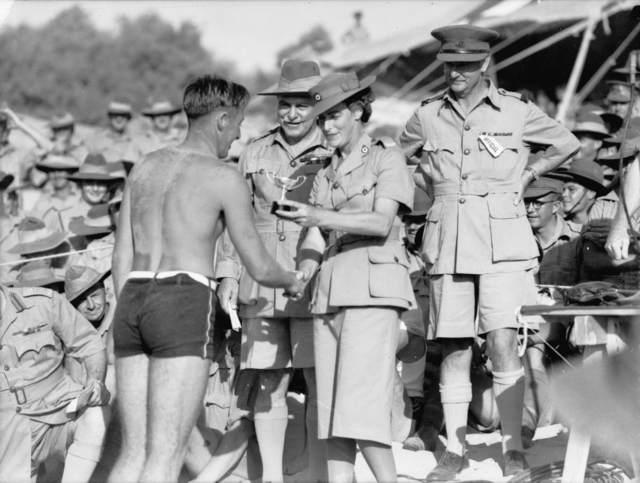
Lady (Olga) Blamey presenting the prizes to the winning teams in the Gaza Beach Surf Lifesaving Carnival. Newspapers in Australia criticised her presence, although the wives of senior British officers, including General Sir Archibald Wavell and Lieutenant General Richard O'Connor, had joined their husbands in the Middle East.

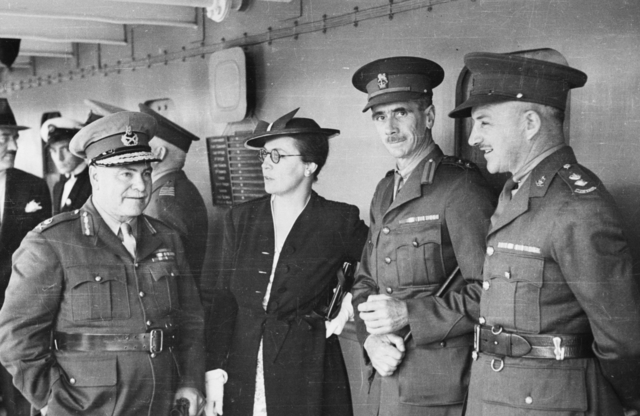
Lieutenant General Sir Thomas Blamey (left) talking with Jessie Vasey and lieutenant colonels George Vasey and John Chapman (right) on board the troop transport Strathallan in December 1939.

On 13 October 1939, a month after the outbreak of the Second World War, Blamey was promoted to lieutenant general, appointed to command the 6th Division, the first formation of the new Second Australian Imperial Force, and received the AIF service number VX1. Menzies limited his choice of commanders by insisting that they be selected from the Militia rather than the Permanent Military Forces (PMF), the Army's full-time, regular component. For brigade commanders, he chose Brigadiers Arthur Allen, Leslie Morshead and Stanley Savige. He selected Brigadier Edmund Herring to command the 6th Division artillery, Colonel Samuel Burston for its medical services, and Lieutenant Colonels Clive Steele and Jack Stevens for its engineers and signals. All except Allen had previously served with him during his time commanding the 3rd Division in Melbourne. For his two most senior staff officers, he chose two PMF officers, Colonel Sydney Rowell as GSO1 and Lieutenant Colonel George Alan Vasey as AA&QMG.

In February 1940, the War Cabinet decided to form a second AIF division, the 7th Division, and group the 6th and 7th Divisions together as I Corps, with Blamey as its commander. On Blamey's recommendation, Major General Iven Mackay was appointed to succeed him in command of the 6th Division, while Lieutenant General John Lavarack, a PMF officer, assumed command of the 7th Division. Blamey took Rowell with him as his corps chief of staff, and picked Major General Henry Wynter as his administrative officer. Blamey flew to Palestine on a Qantas flying boat in June 1940. He refused to allow his troops to perform police duties in Palestine, and established warm relations with the Jewish community there, becoming a frequent guest in their homes.

As commander of the AIF, Blamey was answerable directly to the Minister of Defence, rather than to the Military Board, with a charter based on that given to Bridges in 1914. Part of this required that his forces remain together as cohesive units, and that no Australian forces were to be deployed or engaged without the prior consent of the Australian government. Blamey was not inflexible and permitted Australian units to be detached when there was a genuine military need. Because the situation in the Middle East lurched from crisis to crisis, this resulted in his troops becoming widely scattered at times. When the crises had passed, however, he wanted units returned to their parent formations. This resulted in conflicts with British commanders. The first occurred in August 1940 when the British Commander in Chief Middle East Command, General Sir Archibald Wavell, and Prime Minister of the United Kingdom, Winston Churchill, ordered the 16th Infantry Brigade to move to Egypt. Blamey refused on the grounds that the brigade was not yet fully equipped, but eventually compromised, sending it on the understanding that it would soon be joined by the rest of the 6th Division.

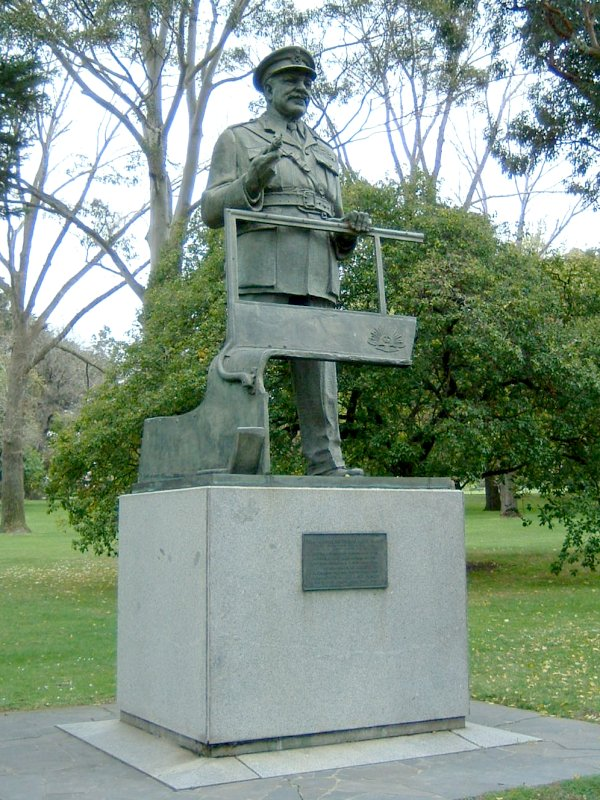
Memorial statue of Field Marshal Blamey in Kings Domain, Melbourne, by Raymond B. Ewers. Blamey is mounted on a jeep instead of the traditional horse. This conveys Blamey's role in the technological transformation of the Army that occurred during his years of service.

I Corps assumed responsibility for the front in Cyrenaica on 15 February 1941, but within days, Blamey was informed that his troops would be sent on the expedition to Greece. Blamey has been criticised for allowing this when he knew it was extremely hazardous, after he was told that Menzies had approved. He insisted, however, on sending the veteran 6th Division first instead of the 7th Division, resulting in a heated argument with Wavell, which Blamey won. He was under no illusions about the odds of success, and immediately prepared plans for an evacuation. His foresight and determination saved many of his men, but he lost credibility when he chose his son Tom to fill the one remaining seat on the aircraft carrying him out of Greece. The campaign exposed deficiencies in the Australian Army's training, leadership and staff work that had passed unnoticed or had not been addressed in the Libyan Campaign. The pressure of the campaign opened a rift between Blamey and Rowell, which was to have important consequences. While Rowell and Brigadier William Bridgeford were extremely critical of Blamey's performance in Greece, this opinion was not widely held. Wavell reported that "Blamey has shown himself a fine fighting commander in these operations and fitted for high command."

The political fallout from the disastrous Battle of Greece led to Blamey's appointment as Deputy Commander in Chief Middle East Command in April 1941. However, to ensure that the command would not pass to Blamey in the event of something happening to Wavell, the British government promoted Sir Henry Maitland Wilson to general in June. Soon afterwards, Wavell was replaced by General Sir Claude Auchinleck. Blamey was subsequently promoted to the same rank on 24 September 1941, becoming only the fourth Australian to reach this rank, after Monash, Chauvel and White. During the Syrian campaign against the Vichy French, Blamey took decisive action to resolve the command difficulties caused by Wilson's attempt to direct the fighting from the King David Hotel in Jerusalem by interposing Lavarack's I Corps headquarters.

During Blamey's absence in Greece, AIF units had become widely scattered, with forces being deployed to Cyprus, and the 9th Division and the 18th Infantry Brigade coming under siege in Tobruk. Blamey would spend the rest of the year attempting to reassemble his forces. This led to a clash with Auchinleck over the relief of Tobruk, where Blamey accepted Burston's advice that the Australian troops there should be relieved on medical grounds. Menzies, and later his successors, Arthur Fadden and John Curtin, backed Blamey, and Auchinleck and Churchill were forced to give way, resulting in the relief of most of the Australian troops by the British 70th Division. For his campaigns in the Middle East, Blamey was created a Knight Commander of the Order of the Bath on 1 January 1942. He was Mentioned in Despatches for the eighth time, and was awarded the Greek War Cross, First Class.

In a long confidential interview with official Australian war correspondent Kenneth Slessor, later published in the 1980s, Blamey stated that the Greek strategic set up was impossible from the start, and was told that if the 6th Division landing didn't come to the aid of Greece, the Lend and Lease Act in the United States would not be passed.

=== Papuan campaign ===
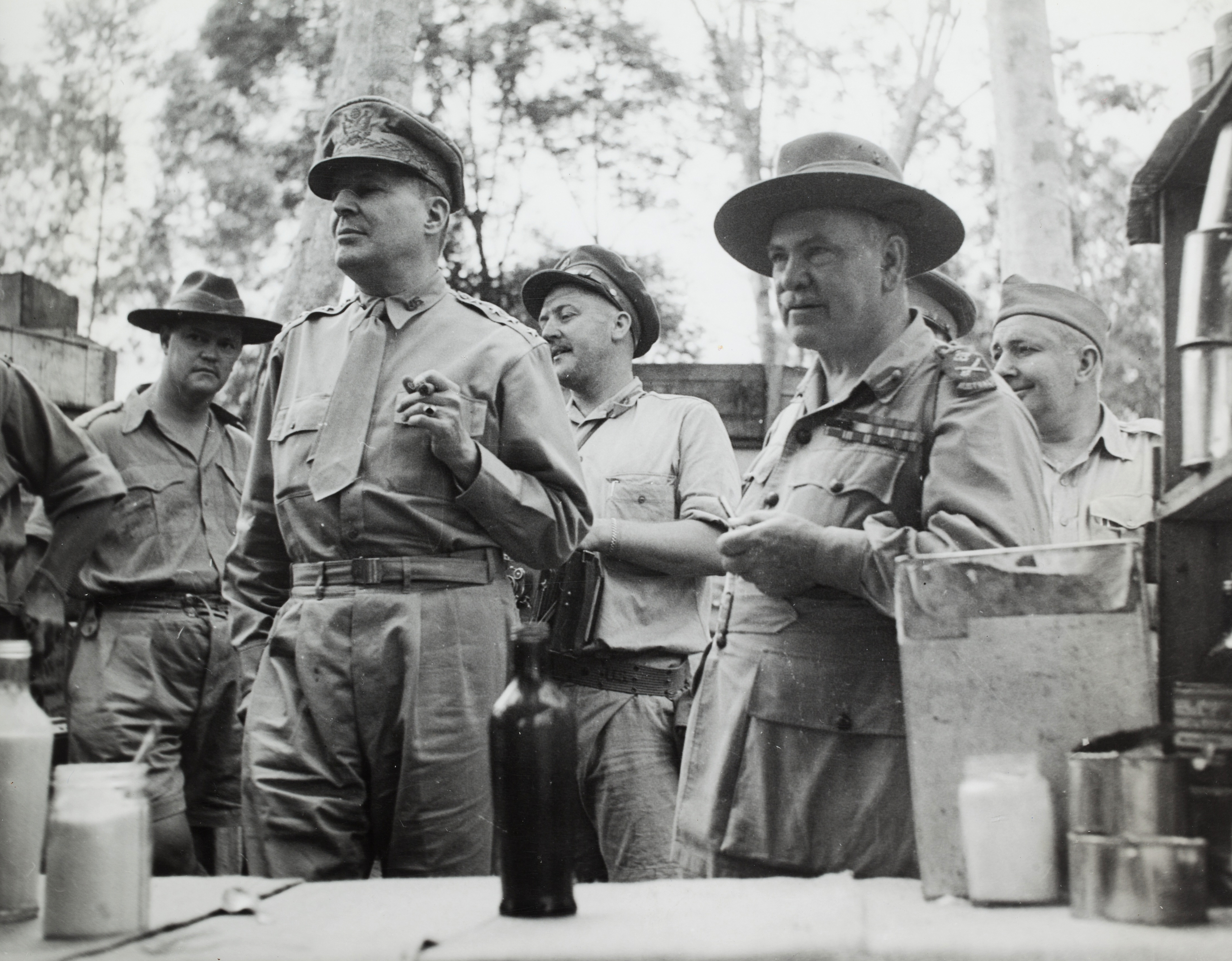
Blamey with MacArthur in October 1942. MacArthur had flown to Port Moresby to consult with Blamey on logistical arrangements for the campaign in Papua.

The defence of Australia took on a new urgency in December 1941 with the entry of Japan into the war. Within the Army there was a concern that Bennett or Lavarack would be appointed as commander-in-chief. In March 1942, Vasey, Herring and Steele approached the Minister for the Army, Frank Forde, with a proposal that all officers over the age of 50 be immediately retired and Major General Horace Robertson be appointed commander-in-chief. This "revolt of the generals" collapsed with the welcome news that Blamey was returning from the Middle East to become commander-in-chief of Australian Military Forces.

General Douglas MacArthur arrived in Australia in March 1942 to become Supreme Commander South West Pacific Area (SWPA). In addition to his duties as commander-in-chief, Blamey became commander of Allied Land Forces, South West Pacific Area. In the reorganisation that followed his return to Australia on 23 March, Blamey appointed Lavarack to command the First Army, Mackay to command the Second Army, and Bennett to command the III Corps in Western Australia. Vasey became deputy chief of the general staff (DCGS), while Herring took over Northern Territory Force, and Robertson became commander of the 1st Armoured Division. Blamey's Allied Land Forces Headquarters (LHQ) was established in Melbourne, but after MacArthur's General Headquarters (GHQ) moved to Brisbane in July 1942, Blamey established an Advanced LHQ in nearby St Lucia, Queensland.

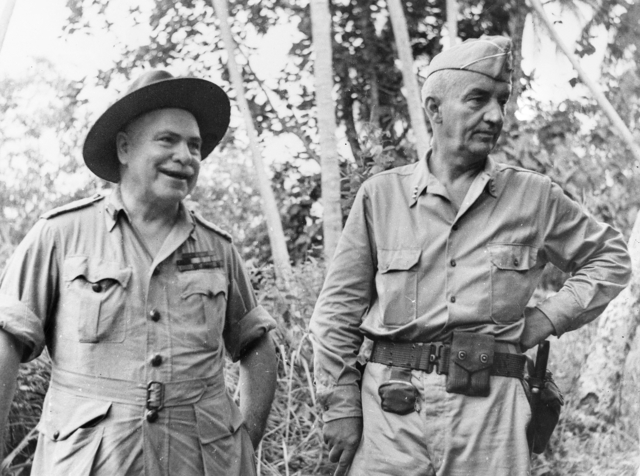
Blamey and Lieutenant General Robert L. Eichelberger

The Allied command structure was soon put under strain by Australian reverses in the Kokoda Track campaign. MacArthur was highly critical of the Australian performance and confided to the Chief of Staff of the United States Army, General George Marshall, that "the Australians have proven themselves unable to match the enemy in jungle fighting. Aggressive leadership is lacking." MacArthur told Curtin that Blamey should be sent up to New Guinea to take personal command of the situation. Curtin later confessed that "in my ignorance (of military matters) I thought that the Commander in Chief should be in New Guinea." Jack Beasley suggested that Blamey would make a convenient scapegoat: "Moresby is going to fall. Send Blamey up there and let him fall with it!"

Blamey felt he had no choice, but his assumption of command of New Guinea Force sat uneasily with Rowell, the commander of I Corps there, who saw it as displaying a lack of confidence in him. A petulant Rowell would not be mollified, and, after a series of disagreements, Blamey relieved Rowell of his command, replacing him with Herring. More reliefs followed. Herring relieved Brigadier Arnold Potts of the 21st Infantry Brigade, replacing him with Brigadier Ivan Dougherty on 22 October. Five days later, Blamey replaced Allen as the 7th Division's commander with Vasey. Nor were generals the only ones to be removed. Blamey cancelled Chester Wilmot's accreditation as a war correspondent in October 1942 for spreading a false rumour that Blamey was taking payments from the laundry contractor at Puckapunyal. Wilmot was reinstated, but on 1 November 1942, Blamey again terminated Wilmot's accreditation, this time for good.

Blamey made a controversial speech to the 21st Infantry Brigade on 9 November 1942. According to the official historian, Dudley McCarthy:

[Blamey] said that the Jap was like a gorilla; he would get into a hole and he would not surrender; while in his hole and protected by it he would kill; to be dealt with he had to be got out of his holes and put on the run. Blamey added that it was like shooting rabbits: while the rabbits were in their burrows they could not be shot; they had to be got on the run and then the man with the gun could get them. "It never entered my head as I stood there on parade that the general had any idea he was being offensive, or that he intended to be so", wrote Brigadier Dougherty (then a newcomer to the brigade) afterwards. "But the brigade gave to what he said the interpretation that 'they ran like rabbits'. This interpretation of what he said spread throughout New Guinea and indeed back home, and resulted in bitter feelings. Following his address to the whole brigade [General Blamey] addressed the officers separately. He was direct with them and said that a few officers in the brigade had failed. This caused bitterness. But after both addresses, Blamey told me that he thought highly of the brigade, and repeated to me what he had told the whole brigade—that I, as their new brigade commander, would be very proud of them."

The implication of cowardice was seen as contrasting with his own inability to stand up to MacArthur and the Prime Minister. Rowell felt that Blamey "had not shown the necessary 'moral courage' to fight the Cabinet on an issue of confidence in me." When American troops suffered serious reverses in the Battle of Buna–Gona, Blamey turned the tables on MacArthur. According to Lieutenant General George Kenney, the commander of Allied Air Forces, Blamey "frankly said he would rather send in more Australians, as he knew they would fight ... a bitter pill for MacArthur to swallow". In January 1943, he visited the Buna–Gona battlefield, surprising Vasey at how far forward he went, seemingly unconcerned about his safety. Blamey was impressed by the strength of the Japanese fortifications that had been captured, later telling correspondents that Australian and American troops had performed miracles.

At the Battle of Wau in January 1943, Blamey won the battle by acting decisively on intelligence, shifting the 17th Infantry Brigade from Milne Bay in time to defeat the Japanese attack. The official historian, Dudley McCarthy, later wrote:

At the very peak of this leadership development was General Blamey himself. His greatness was demonstrated almost daily by a knowledge unparalleled in Australia of how an army should be formed and put to work; by his exercise of the vital field command at the same time as he kept within his grasp a vastly detailed control of the Australian Army as a whole; by his sagacity and strength in meeting the rapidly changing demands of a difficult political situation; by his ability speedily to encompass the requirements of the new war and plan far ahead of the events of the day as he controlled them; by his generally unappreciated humanity.

For the Papuan Campaign, MacArthur awarded Blamey the American Distinguished Service Cross, and Blamey was created a Knight Grand Cross of the Order of the British Empire on 28 May 1943. This was unusual as it was the Australian Labor Party's policy not to award knighthoods, but was done as a response to the British government's awards to British and American officers for the North African campaign. Blamey's and Herring's knighthoods would be the last that the Labor government would award to Australian soldiers.

=== New Guinea Campaign ===
The relationship between MacArthur and Blamey was generally good, and they had great respect for each other's abilities. MacArthur's main objection was that, as commander-in-chief of AMF as well as commander of Allied Land Forces, Blamey was not wholly under his command. Official historian Gavin Long argued that:

Nothing substantial would have been gained by this arrangement and much would have been lost: notably the existence of a single commander who could advise the Australian Government on all the problems of its army and be answerable to that Government for the manner in which it was employed both at home and in the field.

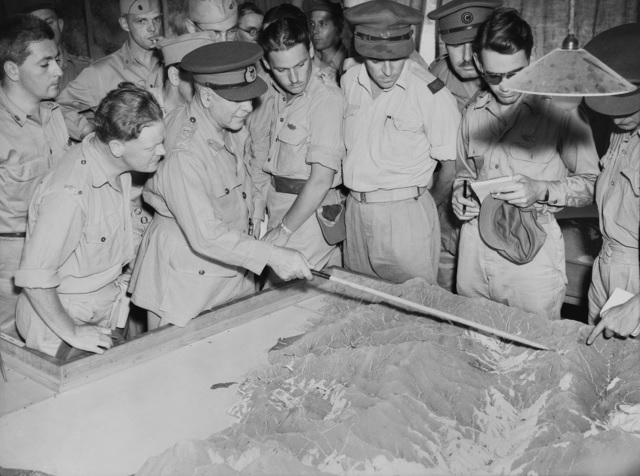
Blamey briefs journalists on operations around Lae in September 1943. The scale model was specially constructed for the planning of this campaign.

The next operation was MacArthur's Operation Cartwheel, an advance on the major Japanese base at Rabaul. The Australian Army was tasked with the capture of the Huon Peninsula. Blamey was ordered to again assume personal command of New Guinea Force. His concept, which he developed with Herring and Frank Berryman, who had replaced Vasey as DCGS, was to draw the Japanese forces away from Lae with a demonstration against Salamaua, and then capture Lae with a double envelopment. Blamey remained a devotee of new technology. His plan called for the use of the landing craft of the 2nd Engineer Special Brigade, and he intended to cross the Markham River with the aid of paratroops. Supplies would be brought across the river using DUKWs, a relatively new invention. He also attempted to acquire helicopters, but met resistance from the RAAF, and they were never delivered. MacArthur accepted a number of changes that Blamey made to his strategy, probably the most notable of which was putting the landing on New Britain before Blamey's attack on Madang.

The campaign started well; Lae was captured well ahead of schedule. Blamey then handed over command of New Guinea Force to Mackay and returned to Australia. The 7th Division then advanced through the Ramu Valley while the 9th Division landed at Finschhafen. The campaign then slowed owing to a combination of logistical difficulties and Japanese resistance. Blamey responded to a request from Mackay to relieve Herring, whose chief of staff had been killed in an aircraft accident. He immediately sent Morshead. In February 1944, there was criticism in Parliament of the way that Blamey had "side tracked" various generals; the names of Bennett, Rowell, Mackay, Wynter, Herring, Lavarack, Robertson, Morshead and Clowes were mentioned. Blamey responded,

We had twelve divisions to fight the Jap. On arrival of other equipment, other considerations came in and we now have six divisions. Can you tell me what should have been done with the surplus generals? I do know that on every occasion I proposed to terminate a general's appointment, politicians have tried to stop it.

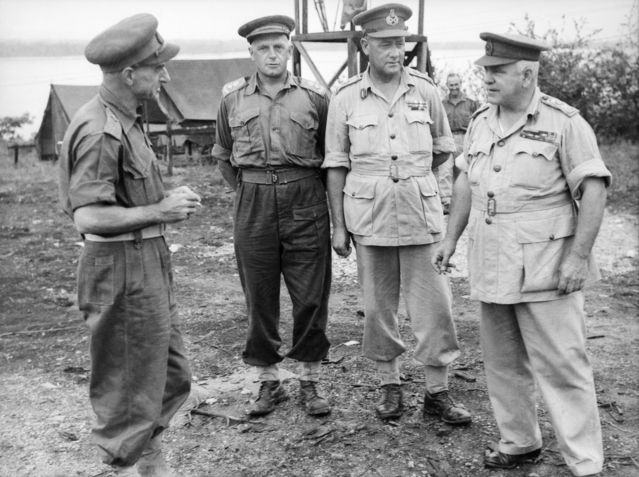
Wewak Area, New Guinea, 1945. Blamey (right) visits the 6th Division, and talks with its commander, Major General Jack Stevens (left), and the Signal Officer in Chief Major General Colin Simpson (third from left).

Frank Forde criticised Blamey for having too many generals. Blamey could only reply that the Australian Army had one general for 15,741 men and women compared to one per 9,090 in the British Army.

Blamey was annoyed by the media campaign run against him by William Dunstan and Keith Murdoch of The Herald and Weekly Times newspaper group, but success in New Guinea led to a change of heart at the newspaper, and Blamey even accepted a dinner invitation from Murdoch in 1944. There was another victory, though, far more significant. The Army had taken heavy casualties from malaria in the fighting in 1942. Blamey took the advice of Edward Ford and Neil Hamilton Fairley, and strongly backed their ultimately successful efforts to control the disease. To acquaint himself with the issues, Blamey read through Manson's Tropical Diseases, the standard medical textbook on the subject. He promoted the work of Howard Florey on the development of penicillin, and wrote to Curtin urging that £A 200,000, equivalent to A$16.19 million in 2022, be earmarked for Florey's vision of a national institute for medical research in Canberra, which ultimately became the John Curtin School of Medical Research.

Blamey was involved in discussions with the government over the size of the Army to be maintained. Now that the danger of invasion of Australia had passed, the government reconsidered how the nation's resources, particularly of manpower, should be distributed. Blamey pressed for a commitment to maintain three AIF divisions, as only they could legally be sent north of the equator, where the final campaigns would be fought. He urged that the Empire Air Training Scheme be curtailed, and opposed MacArthur's proposal to use the Australian Army primarily for logistic support and leave combat roles principally to American troops.

=== Final campaigns ===
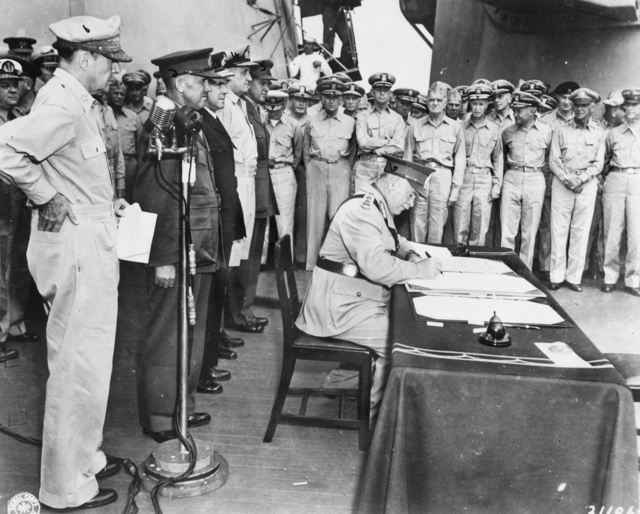
Blamey signing the Japanese instrument of surrender on the behalf of Australia.

On 5 April 1944, Blamey departed for San Francisco on board SS Lurline for the first leg of a voyage to attend the 1944 Commonwealth Prime Ministers' Conference in London as part of Curtin's party. The journey was made by sea and rail due to Curtin's fear of flying. Also on board the ship were American military personnel returning to the United States, and some 40 Australian war brides. Blamey "was always attractive to women and attracted by them. Advancing years had not reduced either his taste for amorous adventures or his capacity to enjoy them", and he brought with him several cases of spirits. The rowdy goings-on in Blamey's cabin did not endear him to the Prime Minister, who was a reformed alcoholic. The party travelled by train to Washington, D.C., where Blamey was warmly greeted by the Joint Chiefs of Staff, and briefed the Combined Chiefs of Staff on the progress of the war in SWPA. In London Blamey had a series of meetings with the Chief of the Imperial General Staff, Field Marshal Sir Alan Brooke, and was briefed on Operation Overlord by General Sir Bernard Montgomery and Air Chief Marshal Sir Arthur Tedder. Blamey was disappointed to have to turn down an offer to accompany the invasion as a guest of General Dwight Eisenhower because Curtin feared that the invasion would lead to retaliatory German bombing, and wanted to be far away before it started.

As a matter of policy, Curtin wanted Australian forces to be involved in liberating New Guinea. MacArthur therefore proposed that Australian troops relieve the American garrisons on New Britain, Bougainville and New Guinea. However, MacArthur balked at Blamey's proposal to replace the seven American divisions with just seven Australian brigades, resulting in the 6th Division being employed as well. The larger garrisons permitted offensive operations and demanded them if the 6th Division was to be freed for employment elsewhere. These operations aroused considerable criticism on the grounds that they were unnecessary, that the troops should have been employed elsewhere, and that the Army's equipment and logistics were inadequate. Blamey vigorously defended his aggressive policy to reduce the bypassed Japanese garrisons and free the civilian population, but some felt that he went too far in putting his case publicly in a national radio broadcast. He was also criticised for not spending enough time in forward areas, although he spent more than half his time outside Australia in 1944, and between April 1944 and April 1945 travelled 105,000 kilometres (65,000 mi) by air, 11,000 kilometres (7,000 mi) by sea and 12,100 kilometres (7,500 mi) by land. Blamey urged that the 7th Division not be sent to Balikpapan, an operation that he regarded as unnecessary. On this occasion, he was not supported by the government, and the operation went ahead as planned.

Gavin Long wrote:

Some of the reasons for Blamey's lack of popularity with several of the Ministers and part of the public can probably be discovered only by exploring traits in the Australian national character of those days; other reasons are easier to unearth. Throughout the war, Blamey commanded an army whose senior appointments were shared between regular and citizen officers. In some places this created tensions and rivalry, which adversely affected Blamey's reputation, through no fault of his own; also the ambiguous relationship between his headquarters and MacArthur's led to disagreements of which at least the Ministers were aware. A man of greater tact, however, could have managed these problems more smoothly. But Blamey was not a man of great tact.

On 2 September 1945, Blamey was with MacArthur on USS Missouri and signed the Japanese surrender document on behalf of Australia. He then flew to Morotai and personally accepted the surrender of the remaining Japanese in the South West Pacific. He insisted that Australia should be represented in the Allied occupation of Japan.

== After the Second World War ==
MacArthur abolished SWPA on 2 September 1945, and on 15 September, Blamey offered to resign. The war was over, and the post of commander-in-chief was now a purely administrative one. His offer was not accepted, but on 14 November, the government abruptly announced that it had accepted his resignation, effective 30 November. A farewell party was held in Melbourne, which was attended by 66 brigadiers and generals. Blamey was given time to write up his despatches and was formally retired on 31 January 1946. Forde asked Blamey if he wanted anything in way of recognition for his services, and Blamey asked for knighthoods for his generals, but Forde could not arrange this. In the end, Forde decided to give Blamey the Buick staff car he had used during the war, which had clocked up 80,000 kilometres (50,000 mi) in the Middle East and the South West Pacific.

Blamey returned to Melbourne, where he devoted himself to business affairs, to writing, and to promoting the welfare of ex-service personnel. In September 1948, Blamey paid a visit to Japan, where he was warmly greeted on arrival at Iwakuni by Horace Robertson, the commander of the British Commonwealth Occupation Force, who also provided an RAAF honour guard. MacArthur sent his own aircraft, the Bataan, to collect Blamey and bring him to Tokyo, where he met Blamey at the airport and gave him another warm greeting. In the late 1940s, Blamey became involved with The Association, an organisation similar to the earlier League of National Security, which was established to counter a possible communist coup. He was the head of the organisation until ill health forced him to stand down in favour of Morshead in 1950.

=== Promotion to field marshal ===
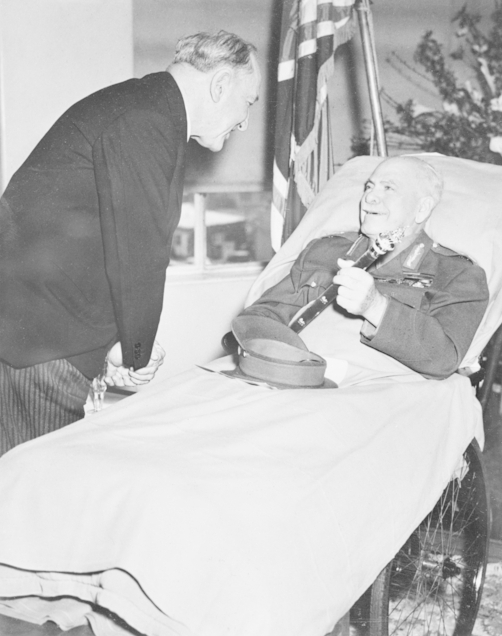
Governor-General William McKell presents Blamey with his field marshal's baton in a bedside ceremony at Heidelberg Repatriation Hospital, 16 September 1950.

Menzies became prime minister again in December 1949, and he resolved that Blamey should be promoted to the rank of field marshal, something that had been mooted in 1945. The recommendation went via the Governor-General, William McKell, to Buckingham Palace in London, which appeared to reply that a dominion officer could not be promoted to the rank. Menzies pointed out that Jan Smuts already had. The King's Official Secretary, Sir Alan Lascelles, then claimed that Blamey could not be promoted to field marshal because he was a retired officer, which was not true. Menzies then restored Blamey to active duty. Blamey was duly promoted to field marshal in the King's Birthday Honours of 8 June 1950. He is the only Australian to attain the rank of field marshal.

A few days afterwards, Blamey became seriously ill. On 16 September 1950 he received his field marshal's baton from McKell in a bedside ceremony at the Heidelberg Repatriation Hospital. Blamey died there of hypertensive cerebral haemorrhage on 27 May 1951. His body lay in state at the Shrine of Remembrance, where 20,000 people filed past. Crowds estimated at 300,000 lined the streets of Melbourne at his state funeral. Ten of his lieutenant generals served as pallbearers: Frank Berryman, William Bridgeford, Edmund Herring, Iven Mackay, Leslie Morshead, John Northcott, Sydney Rowell, Stanley Savige, Vernon Sturdee and Henry Wells. His body was cremated at the Fawkner Crematorium and Memorial Park.

== Legacy ==
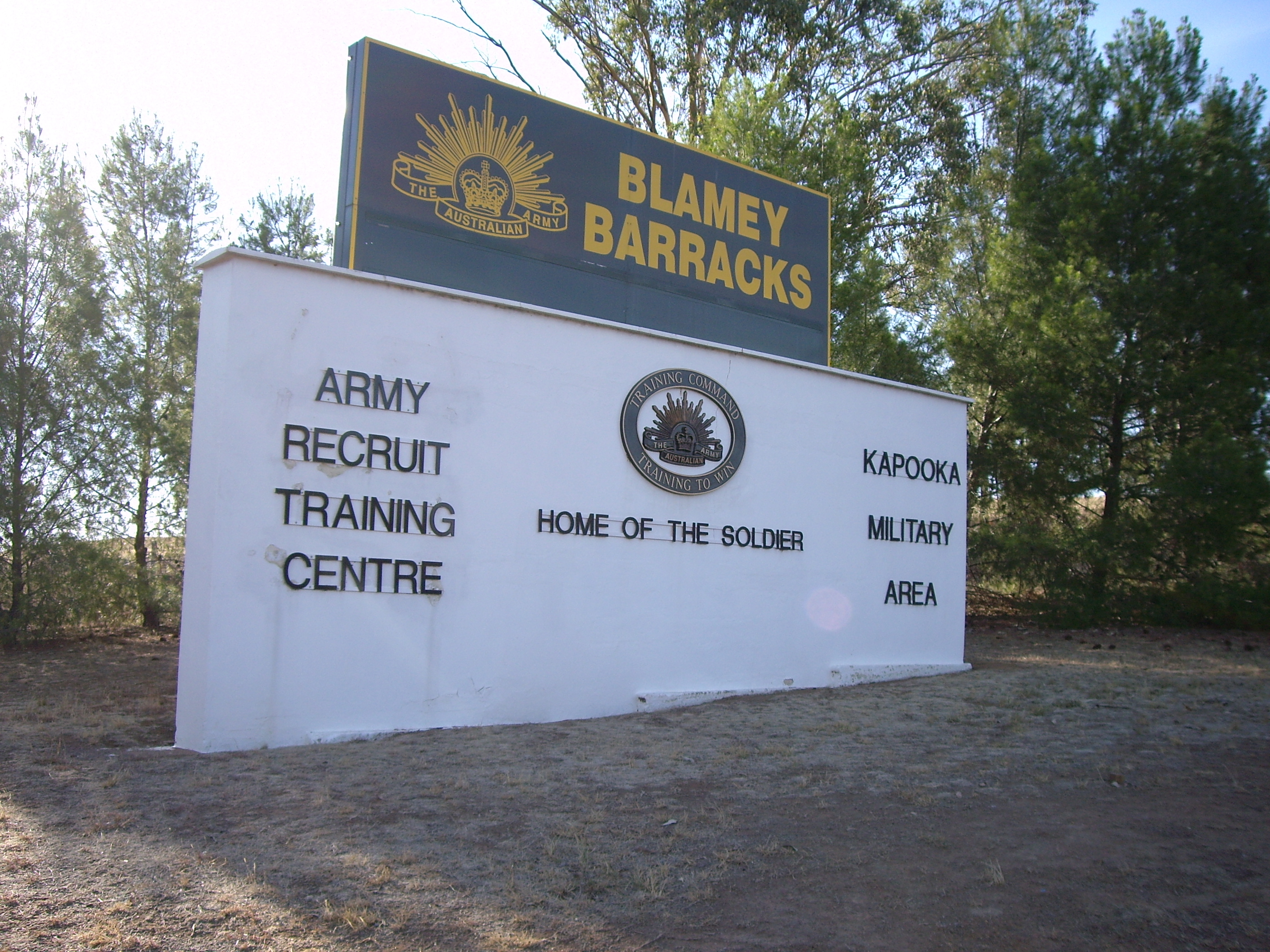
Army Recruit Training Centre entrance sign. The legend "home of the soldier" refers to Kapooka's role in recruit training.

Blamey is honoured in Australia in various ways, including a square named after him which is situated outside the Russell Offices headquarters of the Australian Defence Force and Department of Defence in the national capital, Canberra. Blamey Crescent and Blamey Place in the Canberra suburb of Campbell are also named in his honour. A statue of Blamey stands in Kings Domain, Melbourne, on the corner of Government House Drive and Birdwood Avenue, opposite that of John Monash. It was sculpted from granite and bronze by Raymond B. Ewers and presented to the city in February 1960. Controversially, the statue portrays Blamey clutching half of a Jeep windscreen, rather than mounted on the traditional horse or simply standing. Blamey Barracks at Kapooka, where the Army Recruit Training Centre is located, is also named in his honour, as are Blamey Street and Blamey Park in North Ryde, New South Wales. His papers are held in the Australian War Memorial, where his field marshal's baton is on display.

== Honours and awards ==

Knight Grand Cross of the Order of the British Empire Military division (1943)
Knight Commander of the Order of the Bath Military division (1942)
Companion of the Order of the Bath Military division (1919)
Knight Bachelor (1935)
Companion of the Order of St Michael and St George (1918)
Distinguished Service Order (1917)
Commander of the Venerable Order of Saint John (1936)
1914–15 Star (1920)
British War Medal (1920)
Victory Medal (1920) (Oakleaf for Mention in Despatches)
1939–1945 Star (1946)
Africa Star (1946)
Pacific Star (1946)
Defence Medal (1946)
War Medal 1939–45 (1946) (Oakleaf for Mention in Despatches)
Australia Service Medal 1939–45 (1946)
King George V Silver Jubilee Medal (1935)
King George VI Coronation Medal (1937)
Efficiency Decoration (1937)
Croix de Guerre (France) (1919)
War Cross (Greece) (1941)
Distinguished Service Cross (United States) (1943)
Knight Grand Cross of the Order of Orange-Nassau (Netherlands) (1947)

== Notes ==
Military offices
New title Newly activated organisation	GOC-in-C Australian Military Forces; 1942–1945	Succeeded by Lieutenant General Vernon Sturdee
New title I Corps activated	GOC I Corps; 1940–1941	Succeeded by Lieutenant General John Lavarack
New title Division activated	GOC 6th Division; 1939–1940	Succeeded by Major General Iven Mackay
Preceded by Major General Harold Elliott	GOC 3rd Division; 1931–1937	Succeeded by Major General Edmund Drake-Brockman
Police appointments
Preceded by Alexander Nicholson	Chief Commissioner of Victoria Police; 1925–1936	Succeeded by Alexander Duncan
