= Division of Corinella =

The Division of Corinella has twice been used as the name of an Australian Electoral Division in Victoria:

- Division of Corinella (1901–06)
- Division of Corinella (1990–96)
