= Alexander Nicholson (police officer) =

Australian police officer

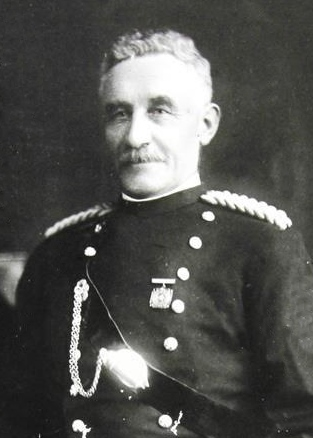

9th Chief Commissioner of Victoria Police
- In office 8 February 1922 – 10 August 1925
- Monarch: George V
- Governor: George Rous, 3rd Earl of Stradbroke
- Preceded by: John Gellibrand
- Succeeded by: Sir Thomas Blamey

Personal details
- Born: Alexander Nicholson c1863
- Died: 8 March 1928 Hawthorn, Victoria, Australia
- Occupation: Police officer

Alexander Nicholson was an Australian police officer and Chief Commissioner of Victoria Police from 1922 to 1925. Nicholson was Chief Commissioner at the time of the 1923 Victorian police strike.

As a constable, Nicholson received a special stripe for valour for his role in an incident at a pub in Lake Wendouree, a suburb of Ballarat, in 1898. Armed only with a truncheon, Nicholson attempted to arrest a drunk armed with a revolver who had taken over the bar. Nicholson was shot at three times in the course of the arrest; all three bullets passed through his coat and one grazed his thumb.

== Background ==
Nicholson was appointed as Chief Commissioner in 1922 at the age of 59 having spent most of his 39 years of service with the police in regional and rural Victoria, in particular the Ballarat area. At the time he was both the oldest and most senior officer in the force. Police historian Robert Haldane wrote "[Nicholson's] affinity with the Ballarat District over many years and his close association with the then Chief Secretary and Minister of Public Health, the sitting member for Ballarat West, Major Matthew Baird, led to suggestions that Nicholson received undue favour in being appointed Chief Commissioner."

Once appointed Nicholson appointed a small group of "special supervisors", plain clothes policeman whose role it was to covertly supervise the police. Nicholson justified this measure stating "I urged very very strongly that the discipline be tightened up - from my own observations and from complaints I had received. I saw men idling about the streets, leaning up against lampposts, gossiping - actually smoking in uniform, and in broad daylight. I saw them drunk at night".

The special supervisors were resented by police rank and file who called them "spooks". This resentment, along with poor pay and conditions, led to the police strike on 1 November 1923. The strike itself led to widespread looting and rioting in Melbourne over a period of three days that was only brought under control through the use of volunteer civilian "special constables" and the armed forces. General Sir John Monash later chaired a Royal Commission into the police strike and subsequent riots.

== Death ==
Nicholson retired as Chief Commissioner in 1925 citing ill-health. In 1927 Nicholson wrote a series of articles for The Age newspaper detailing his career as a police officer. He died on 8 March 1928, aged 65.

Nicholson was a lay Presbyterian preacher and Freemason. He is the grandfather of Alastair Nicholson, Chief Justice of the Family Court of Australia from 1988 to 2004.

Preceded by John Gellibrand	Chief Commissioner of Victoria Police; 1922–1925	Succeeded by Thomas Blamey
