= Alexander Duncan (police officer) =

Scottish-Australian police officer

Alexander Duncan CMG
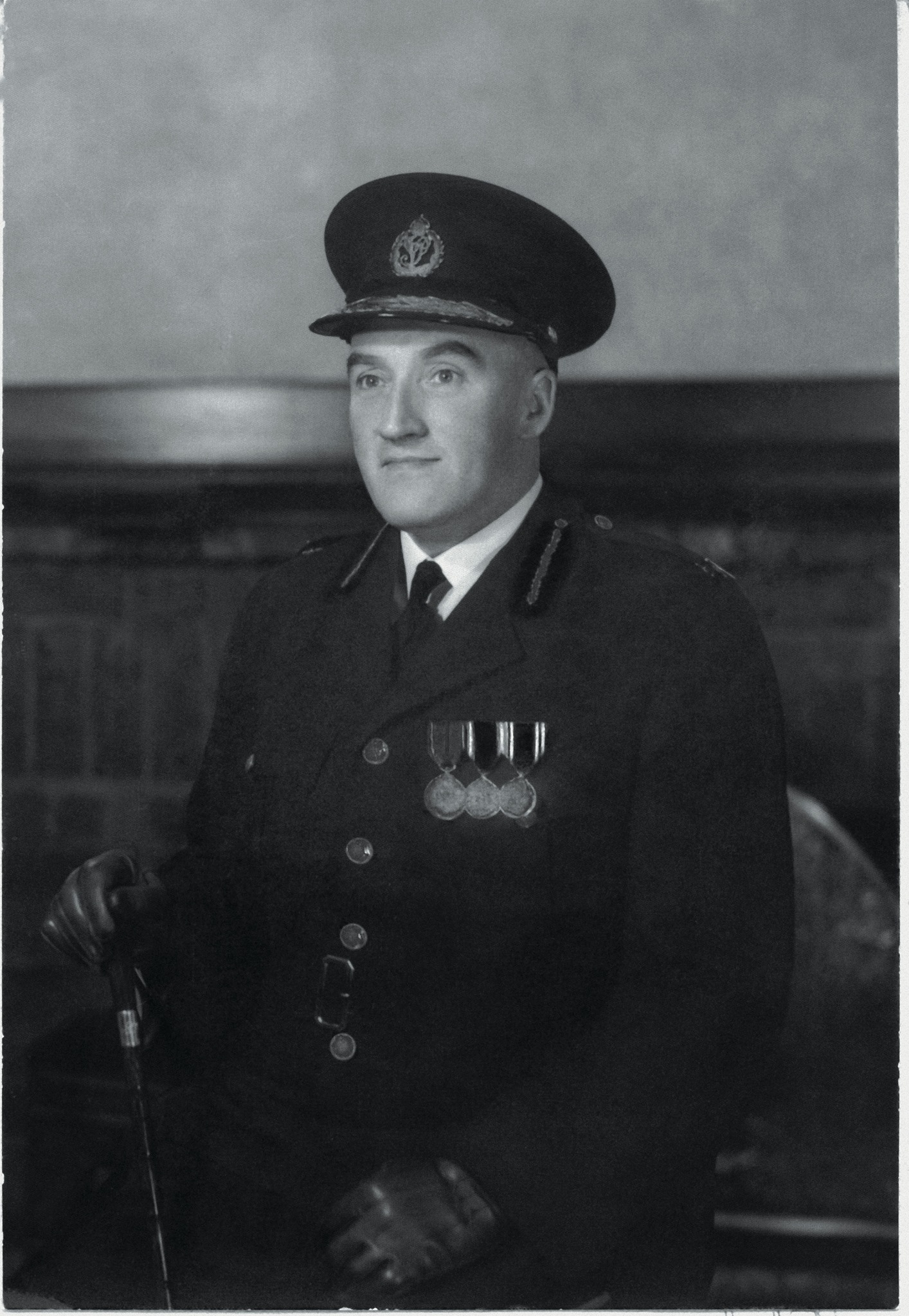

11th Chief Commissioner of Victoria Police
- In office 14 February 1937 – 30 December 1954
- Preceded by: Thomas Blamey
- Succeeded by: Selwyn Porter

Personal details
- Born: Alexander Mitchell Duncan; 25 September 1888 Mortlach, Banffshire, Scotland
- Died: 1 September 1965 (aged 76) Brighton, Victoria, Australia
- Occupation: Police officer

Alexander Mitchell Duncan CMG (25 September 1888–1 September 1965) was a Scottish-Australian police officer. Duncan was Chief Commissioner of Victoria Police from 1937 to 1954.

== Britain ==
Duncan was born in 1888 in Mortlach—a town in Banffshire in northern Scotland. His father, John, was a farmer and his mother, Elizabeth, née Mitchell.

After completing his education in Dufftown, Duncan moved to London where he joined the Metropolitan Police in 1910. He served with the Metropolitan Police for 26 years; most of his work with the Criminal Investigation Department. Duncan rose to the rank of Chief Inspector and in 1935 was given command of the "Flying Squad".

== Australia ==
In 1936, Duncan was seconded to the state government of Victoria to inspect and report on the Victoria Police Force. The appointment was made by Premier of Victoria Albert Dunstan on the advice of the Metropolitan Police Commissioner Sir Philip Game—a former Governor of New South Wales. Dunstan ordered the inspection after the controversial resignation of the previous Chief Commissioner Thomas Blamey amid public allegations of widespread corruption within the force.

Duncan presented two reports to the Victorian government which recommended a range of reforms, including detective training and the use of forensic science and changes to the promotion system and the deployment of personnel. The recommendations were accepted by the government who then appointed Duncan to the position of Chief Commissioner "with a mandate to introduce the reforms".

Once appointed, Duncan began the task of dealing with "entrenched bad practice, poor leadership, maladministration and corruption. Duncan made some headway in his term but was unable to address these problems immediately. Duncan retired from Victoria Police in 1954.

== Personal life ==
Duncan married Elizabeth Ann MacDonald on 1 September 1917 at Trinity Presbyterian Church, Lambeth, with whom he had one daughter. Duncan was active in the "Boy Scouts' Association, Melbourne Rotary, YMCA, the Royal Humane Society, the National Fitness Council and the State Relief Committee." He died in Brighton, a suburb of Melbourne, in 1965.

== Honours and awards ==

Companion of the Order of St Michael and St George (CMG)	1 January 1946	In recognition of service as Chief Commissioner of Police in Victoria.
Officer of the Order of St John	7 January 1955	
King George V Police Coronation Medal	22 June 1911	
King George V Silver Jubilee Medal	6 May 1935	
King George VI Coronation Medal	12 May 1937	
Queen Elizabeth II Coronation Medal	2 June 1953	

Preceded by Thomas Blamey	Chief Commissioner of Victoria Police; 1937–1954	Succeeded by Selwyn Porter
