= Division of Corinella (1901–1906) =

Former Australian federal electoral division

Corinella Australian House of Representatives Division
- Created: 1901
- Abolished: 1906
- Namesake: Corinella region
- Coordinates: 37°15′00″S 144°20′00″E

The Division of Corinella was an Australian electoral division in the state of Victoria. It was named for the Corinella gold mining district in central Victoria and was based on the town of Castlemaine. It also included the towns of Kyneton, Woodend, Gordon and Ballan.

The division was proclaimed in 1900, and was one of the original 65 divisions to be contested at the first federal election. It was abolished in 1906, and replaced by the Division of Mernda (Kyneton and Woodend), Division of Laanecoorie (Castlemaine) and Division of Corio (Gordon and Ballan).

== Members ==
Image	Member	Party	Term	Notes
	James McCay (1864–1930)	Protectionist	29 March 1901 – 12 December 1906	Previously held the Victorian Legislative Assembly seat of Castlemaine. Served as minister under Reid. Failed to win the Division of Corio after Corinella was abolished in 1906

== See also ==
- Division of Corinella (1990–96)
