= Harry Lawson (politician) =

Australian politician (1875–1952)

The Honourable Sir Harry Lawson KCMG
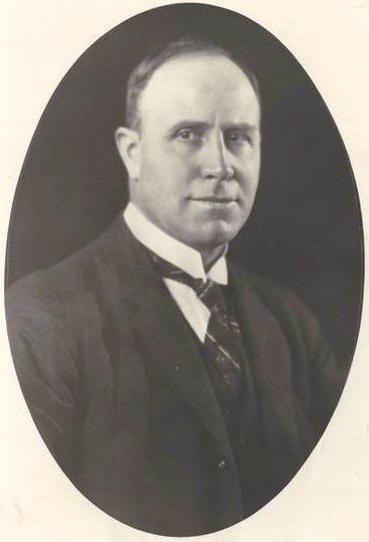

27th Premier of Victoria
- In office 21 March 1918 – 28 April 1924
- Constituency: Castlemaine and Maldon
- Preceded by: John Bowser
- Succeeded by: Alexander Peacock

Senator for Victoria
- In office 1 July 1929 – 30 June 1935

Personal details
- Born: 5 March 1875 Dunolly, Victoria, Australia
- Died: 12 June 1952 (aged 77) East Melbourne, Victoria, Australia
- Party: Nationalist (1917–31); UAP (1931–35)
- Spouse: Olive Adele Horwood

Sir Harry Sutherland Wightman Lawson KCMG (5 March 1875 – 12 June 1952), was an Australian politician who served as Premier of Victoria from 1918 to 1924. He later entered federal politics, serving as a Senator for Victoria from 1929 to 1935, and was briefly a minister in the Lyons government. He was a member of the Nationalist Party until 1931, when it was subsumed into the United Australia Party.

== Early life ==
Lawson was born in Dunolly, the son of a Presbyterian clergyman of Scottish descent. He was educated at a local school and then, briefly, at Scotch College in Melbourne. He was a noted Australian rules footballer, playing for Castlemaine. He studied law with a Melbourne law firm and was called to the bar. He began a practice in Castlemaine, and was elected to the town council, serving as mayor in 1905. In 1901, he married Olive Horwood, with whom he had eight children.

== State politics ==
In a by-election in December 1899, Lawson was elected to the Victorian Legislative Assembly for Castlemaine as a Liberal, and represented the district, in its different incarnations, for 28 years. In June 1904, he was elected to the new Electoral district of Castlemaine and Maldon, holding the seat until a redistribution in 1927, when he was elected as member for Castlemaine and Kyneton. Lawson was President of the Board of Land and Works in the government of William Watt from 1913 to 1915, and Attorney-General and Solicitor-General in the government of Alexander Peacock from 1915 to 1917. He remained loyal to Peacock when most country Liberal members supported John Bowser's rural faction, the Economy Party. When Bowser's short-lived government ended with his resignation in March 1918, Lawson succeeded him, also holding the portfolios of Attorney-General and Minister of Labour.

Lawson became the longest-serving premier Victoria had seen, holding office for six continuous years, something none of his 26 predecessors had done. That was despite the further fragmentation of the non-Labor vote with the emergence of the Country Party. At the 1921 elections, Lawson's Nationalist Party won 30 seats, to Labor's 20 and the Country Party's 13. Both Labor and the Country Party preferred Lawson to each other, so Lawson was able to survive as a minority Premier. He was helped by Labor's continuing inability to win seats outside its strongholds in the industrial suburbs of Melbourne and a few provincial towns.

The biggest test Lawson faced was the 1923 Victorian Police strike, which saw riots and looting in the streets of Melbourne. There was also increasingly bitter industrial strife in Melbourne as the prosperity of the pre-war years failed to return. There were major strikes on the waterfront and in the coal mining industry. Lawson gained a reputation as a tough conservative. He refused to give in to the demands of the police for better pay and conditions, running the risk of a breakdown in law and order, but once the strike was over he appointed a Royal Commission into police grievances, which gave them much of what they wanted.

In September 1923, Lawson formed Victoria's first conservative coalition, including five Country Party ministers. The coalition broke down in March 1924 when the Country Party made demands Lawson would not accept. The Country Party ministers resigned and united with Labor to bring Lawson down. After unsuccessfully contesting the Speakership, Lawson retired to the back bench, where he stayed until October 1928, when he quit state politics altogether.

== Federal politics ==
At the 1928 election, Lawson was elected to the Senate as a Nationalist, taking his seat in July 1929. In October, the Scullin Labor government came to power and Lawson spent two years in opposition. In October 1933, he was appointed an Assistant Minister in the Lyons United Australia Party government and, in 1934, he was made Minister in charge of Territories. In 1933, he was made a Knight Commander of the Order of St Michael and St George. He retired at the 1934 election, his parliamentary term ending in June 1935.

== Death and legacy ==
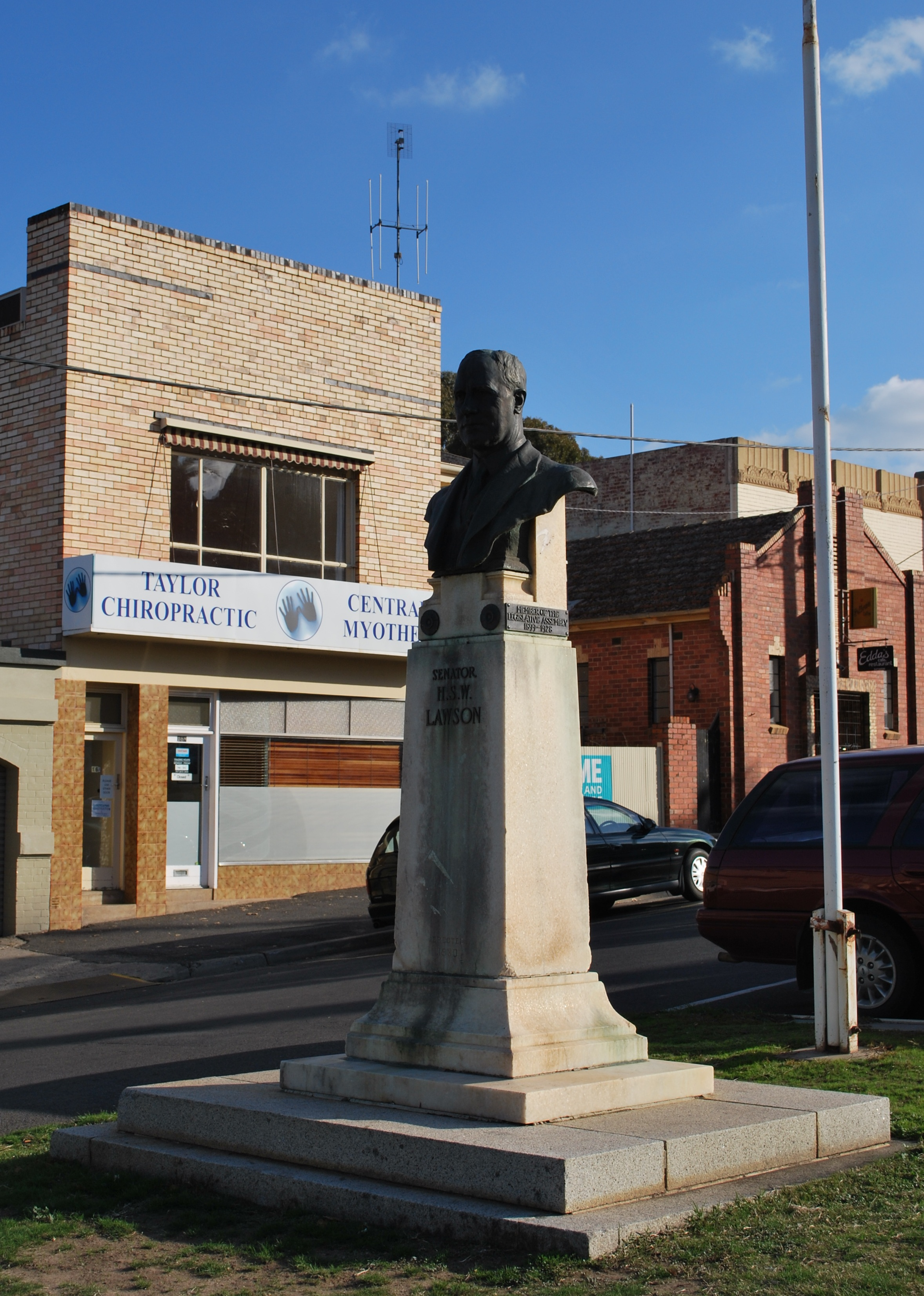
Bust of Lawson at Castlemaine, Victoria

Lawson died in East Melbourne, survived by seven of his eight children. His wife died in 1949 and his youngest son, who had joined the Royal Australian Air Force, was killed in 1941. His daughter, Helen Mary Keays, was appointed an OBE in 1972 for Women's Services. His last surviving child, Ina Constance Watson, died in Melbourne on 9 November 2012.

== Notes ==
Parliament of Victoria
Preceded by James Whiteside McCay	Member for Castlemaine; 1900–1904	Succeeded by Electorate abolished
New division	Member for Castlemaine and Maldon; 1904–1927	Succeeded by Electorate abolished
New division	Member for Castlemaine and Kyneton; 1927-1928	Succeeded by Walter Langslow

Political offices
Preceded by John Bowser	Premier of Victoria; 1918–1924	Succeeded by Alexander Peacock
Preceded by Charles Marr	Minister in charge of Territories; 1932–1934	Succeeded by George Pearce
