= 1923 Victorian police strike =

Event in Melbourne, Australia

The 1923 Victorian police strike occurred in Melbourne, Victoria, Australia. In November 1923, on the eve of the Melbourne Spring Racing Carnival, half the police force in Melbourne went on strike over the operation of a supervisory system using labour spies, nicknamed "spooks". Riots and looting followed as crowds poured out of the main Flinders Street railway station on the Friday and Saturday nights and made their way up Elizabeth and Swanston streets, smashing shop windows, looting, and overturning a tram.

== Reasons for the strike ==
The strike started late in the evening of 31 October 1923 – the eve of Melbourne's Spring Racing Carnival – when a squad of 29 (Note: 30 initial strikers, according to Hugh Buggy) constables at Russell Street Police Headquarters refused to go on duty, citing the continued use of spies by management. The Victoria Police force at the time was understaffed, lowly paid in comparison with other state police forces, and had no industry pension, with the government continually deferring promises to introduce a pension program.

The Police Association had made repeated attempts to improve the pay and conditions of the force, but the immediate cause of the conflict was the decision by the relatively new chief commissioner of police, Alexander Nicholson, to set up a system of four "special supervisors" to secretly monitor beat cops as they went about their duties. Drawn from police ranks, those men were given the derogatory nickname "spooks". The strike was led by Constable William Thomas Brooks who, along with 16 colleagues, had been dismissed from the licensing squad earlier that year, without explanation, and returned to the beat. That might have been connected with the fact that, two years earlier, Brooks had circulated a petition among his fellow officers calling for better conditions. Headed Comrades and Fellow Workers, it was signed by almost 700 men.

The strike was not a Police Association initiative, although the organisation negotiated with the Nationalist government of Victoria, led by the premier, Harry Lawson, on behalf of the strikers. Most of the strikers were constables, many of them returned servicemen. Detectives and senior officers did not participate.

After 24 hours, Lawson demanded a return to work and promised no victimisation, although there was no promise to meet the strikers' demands. After 48 hours, Lawson again demanded a return to work but with no guarantees regarding victimisation.

The Victorian Trades Hall Council, surprised by the wildcat strike, volunteered to negotiate on behalf of the strikers but was rebuffed by the government. Subsequently, 634 policemen were discharged and two were dismissed, about a third of the Victorian Police Force, most of them never to be re-employed as members of the force.

== Rioting and looting in Melbourne city centre ==
On Friday and Saturday nights, riots and looting occurred in the city, resulting in three deaths, a tram being turned over, plate glass windows being smashed, and merchandise looted from stores. Large crowds gathered to witness what was going on. Constables on point duty were jeered at and harassed by people until they retreated to the Town Hall, where the crowd taunted them to come out. Tramways staff and uniformed sailors helped to direct traffic in the absence of police.

A request by the premier to the federal government for troops to prevent and put down trouble was refused, but Sir Harry Chauvel, and other army chiefs, appointed guards at defence establishments. Over the weekend, five thousand volunteer "special constables" were sworn in to help restore order. They were under the direction of Sir John Monash at the Melbourne Town Hall and led by AIF veterans and CMF officers. The special constables were identified by badges and armbands.

All of Melbourne's newspapers quickly attributed the rioting and looting to Melbourne's criminal element, but subsequent court records show that most of the offenders who were apprehended were young men and boys without criminal histories. After the strike, its origins and effects were investigated by the Monash Royal Commission. The government subsequently improved pay and conditions for police, and legislated to establish a police pension scheme before the end of 1923.
