= Electoral district of Castlemaine and Maldon =

Former electoral district of the Victorian Legislative Assembly, Australia

Coordinates: 37°02′S 144°08′E

Castlemaine and Maldon Victoria—Legislative Assembly
- State: Victoria
- Created: 1904
- Abolished: 1927
- Demographic: Rural

The Electoral district of Castlemaine and Maldon was an electoral district of the Victorian Legislative Assembly (Australia).

== History ==
Castlemaine Boroughs was created in 1856 and abolished in 1859. It was replaced by Castlemaine in 1859 which was itself abolished in 1904, Harry Lawson being one of the two members since December 1899. Castlemaine and Maldon was created in 1904.

== Members for Castlemaine and Maldon ==
Member	Party	Term
Harry Lawson	Nationalist	1904–1927

Lawson was Premier of Victoria 21 March 1918 to 28 April 1924. The Electoral district of Castlemaine and Kyneton was created in 1927, Lawson being the first member.

== See also ==
- Parliaments of the Australian states and territories
- List of members of the Victorian Legislative Assembly
