= Police union =

Trade union for police officers

A police union is a trade union for police officers. Police unions formed later than most other occupations, reflecting both a conservative tendency and relatively superior working conditions. The first police unions formed in the United States. Shortly after World War I, the rising cost of living, wage reductions, concerns over amount of rest and growing dissatisfaction among rank and file police officers led to a number of police strikes from 1918–1923 and the formation of police unions globally.

== Police unions by country ==
=== Australia ===
The Police Federation of Australia represents police officers in all federal states. Police in Australia have nearly 100% union membership rate and are active in promoting better wages and working conditions, along with broader administration of law enforcement and legal advocacy. However, police are prohibited from striking, so unions and associations have adopted alternative tactics including picketing, flyering and work-to-rule campaigns.

==== History ====
The first police union formed in Australia was the Police Association of South Australia in 1911, representing Australia's oldest police force. This was followed by the establishment of the following regional unions:

- Western Australian Union of Police Workers (1912)
- Queensland Police Union of Employees (1915)
- Police Association of Victoria (Victoria; 1917)
- Police Association of New South Wales (1920)
- Police Association of Tasmania (1923)
- Police Association of A.C.T (1933)
- Northern Territory Police Association (1945)

The Police Federation of Australia and New Zealand was also formed in 1945, which was later renamed in 1998 to the modern day Police Federation of Australia and is affiliated with the ACTU.

=== Canada ===
The first Canadian police union was formed on September 5, 1918, in Saint John, New Brunswick. The Canadian Police Association is a Canadian advocacy organization for police officers, with membership of over 60,000 police personnel serving in 160 police services across Canada. There are 27 regional chapters at municipal, provincial, and federal levels. These include the Toronto Police Association and the Vancouver Police Union.

A police strike in Montreal in October 1969 led to the Murray-Hill riot, named for the company that held a monopoly on taxi traffic at the Dorval Airport, now the Montréal–Trudeau International Airport. Amid a background of ethnic tensions, six years of steady bombings of the Front de libération du Québec, rioting by separatists, a coincidental gangland war for control of the city, and a record high murder rate in the city, the Montreal Police Service called for a day-long "study session" at the Paul Sauvé Arena. They were joined by militant cab drivers, who chose the Murray-Hill building as a target. Two persons were killed, several injured, six banks were robbed, vandalism, looting and arson common, and millions of dollars of damage done during the 16-hour walkout. The police did not legally strike as a union. The contractual right to a "study session" as written into the provincial Code of Labor adopted in 1964, allowed for such a work stoppage, which is technically not considered a strike.

Until 2015, federal law prevented the members of the Royal Canadian Mounted Police from forming a union. This prohibition was struck down by the Supreme Court of Canada. In 2019 the National Police Federation's members voted 97% in favour of a motion to certify as a union after having filed an application with the Federal Public Service Labour Relations and Employment Board (FPSLREB) in April 2018. Another group called the Quebec Mounted Police Members Association had also applied, but only to represent the approximately 900 RCMP members in Quebec; that application was dismissed by the FPSLREB. In 2021 the first collective agreement between the National Police Federation and the federal government was announced on June 28. On July 27 it was officially ratified by a vote of the Federation's members, and was signed on August 6 to enter into force on April 1, 2022. The agreement include a retroactive pay raise going back to 2017. Municipal governments in several provinces that use the RCMP for "contract policing" complained that the new agreement added costs to their budgets without having had a seat at the bargaining table, and launched a campaign calling on the federal government to absorb the higher costs.

=== Finland ===
The Finnish Police Union (Finnish: Suomen Poliisijärjestöjen Liitto, SPJL) was established in 1923. According to the union as of 2022, 90% of Finnish police officers belong to it, as do police staff, the Finnish Security Intelligence Service, and employees of the judiciary and emergency services.

=== France ===
The UN1TÉ union represent French police officers. One of their well-known national delegates is Linda Kebbab.

=== Germany ===
There are three police unions in Germany: the Trade Union of the Police (Gewerkschaft der Polizei), one of eight industrial affiliations of the German Confederation of Trade Unions (DGB); the Deutsche Polizeigewerkschaft, affiliated with the German Civil Service Federation; and the Bund Deutscher Kriminalbeamter, which is exclusively for members of the Kriminalpolizei.

=== Ireland ===
In the Republic of Ireland, it is illegal for members of the national police force, the Garda Síochána, to form a union, and they are forbidden by law from striking. The Garda Síochana Act 2005 states that it is a serious offence (punishable by a fine of up to €50,000 and/or five years' imprisonment) to "induce [...] any member of the Garda Síochána to withhold his or her services or to commit a breach of discipline"; this law has been interpreted as meaning that anyone organising a police strike could be prosecuted. Senior gardaí make their views known through the Association of Garda Sergeants and Inspectors (AGSI) and the rank and file have the Garda Representative Association (GRA).

The closest to a police strike was on 1 May 1998, when in the "Blue Flu" incident, 5,000 Gardaí reported sick; public order was maintained by putting the Irish Army on standby and removing Gardaí from training and administrative work. In 2017 the two organisations requested formal union status and the right to strike; in 2014 the Council of Europe's committee on social rights ruled that Ireland was in breach of the European social charter in denying Gardaí the right to industrial relations mechanisms.

The Airport Police, Dublin Harbour Police and Dún Laoghaire Harbour Police are part of the SIPTU union.

=== Japan ===
Trade unions of police officials (including ones working in the Japan Coast Guard and in penal facilities) are banned as per Article 108-2 of the National Public Service Act.

=== Sweden ===
The Police Union (Swedish: Polisförbundet) is a trade union in Sweden. It has a membership of 18,500 (including police academy students), and is affiliated with the Swedish Confederation of Professional Employees, and EuroCOP. It also maintains contact with the Swedish branch of the International Police Association.

=== United Kingdom ===
The National Union of Police and Prison Officers was effectively forced to disband by the Police Act 1919, in response to police strikes in the preceding year, which banned police in Great Britain from being members of trade unions or taking industrial action. (The Constabulary and Police (Ireland) Act 1919 did the same in Ireland.) Since then, labour disputes involving low-ranking police have been mediated by statutory police federations, which are regulated separately from trade unions: the Police Federation of England and Wales, the Scottish Police Federation, and the Police Federation for Northern Ireland.

=== United States ===
Police unions in the United States encompass a variety of organizations. About 80% of police unions engaged in employee contract negotiations are independent, operate in a municipality or a region of similar size, and are not affiliated with larger organized labor unions. The Peace Officers Research Association of California (PORAC) is the largest statewide organization in America. The national Fraternal Order of Police is the largest single organization, which includes both labor union locals and fraternal lodges. The police union with the largest membership nationally is the International Union of Police Associations, which is chartered with the AFL–CIO since 1979.

For decades after the Boston Police Strike of 1919, police and other public employees were prevented by state laws from organizing. Only in the 1960s did those laws change to allow public-sector employees the right to collective bargaining.

== See also ==
- Police strike
- Blue flu
