= Kebbab =

Kebbab is a surname. Notable people with the surname include:

- Linda Kebbab (born 1981), French police unionist
- Nabil Kebbab (born 1983), Algerian swimmer

== See also ==
- Kebab
