= Energy Catalyzer =

Claimed cold fusion reactor

The Energy Catalyzer (also called E-Cat) is a supposed cold fusion reactor promoted by its inventor Andrea Rossi with support from the late physicist Sergio Focardi. An Italian patent, awarded without a technical examination, describes the apparatus as a "process and equipment to obtain exothermal reactions, in particular from nickel and hydrogen". Rossi and Focardi said the device worked by infusing heated hydrogen into nickel powder, transmuting it into copper and producing excess heat. An international patent application received an unfavorable international preliminary report on patentability in 2011 because it was adjudged to "offend against the generally accepted laws of physics and established theories".

The device has been the subject of claimed demonstrations and tests several times, and commented on by various academics and others. No independent tests have ever been made, and no peer-reviewed tests of the device have ever been published. Steve Featherstone wrote in Popular Science that by the summer of 2012 Rossi's "outlandish claims" for the E-Cat seemed "thoroughly debunked".

== Demonstrations ==
Invited guests attended several demonstrations in Bologna in 2011. The device has not been independently verified. Of a January demonstration, Discovery Channel analyst Benjamin Radford wrote that "If this all sounds fishy to you, it should," and that "In many ways cold fusion is similar to perpetual motion machines. The principles defy the laws of physics, but that doesn't stop people from periodically claiming to have invented or discovered one." According to Phys.org (11 August 2011), the demonstrations held from January to April 2011 had several flaws that compromised their credibility and Rossi had refused to perform tests that could verify his claims.

University of Bologna researchers have attended some E-Cat demonstrations, but only as observers. On 5 November 2011, the University of Bologna clarified that its researchers had not been involved in the demonstrations and that none of those took place at the university. Rossi had signed a contract with the university, but the contract was terminated and no research was done because Rossi did not make the first payment.

Skeptic Ian Bryce speculated that the E-Cat was misconnected during demonstrations, and that the power attributed to fusion is supplied to the device through the earth wire. Dick Smith offered Rossi one million dollars to demonstrate that the E-Cat system worked as claimed, while the power through the earth wire was also being measured, which Rossi refused. Peter Thieberger, a senior physicist at Brookhaven National Laboratory, said it would be very difficult for this misconnection to happen by accident and that the issue could only be cleared with a fully independent test.

On 28 October 2011 the unit was "customer tested" and was said to release 2,635 kWh during five and a half hours of self-sustained mode, an average power of 479 kilowatts – just under half the promised power of one megawatt. Independent observers were not allowed to watch the measurements or make their own, and the plant remained connected to a power supply during the test allegedly to supply power to the fans and the water pumps.

After working with Rossi, Sergio Focardi concluded that nuclear fusion reactions happen inside the Energy Catalyzer. Focardi states that the nuclear process is facilitated by a secret additive, known only by Rossi and not by him. According to Focardi, the process would be much less intense without this additive. Rossi and Focardi are then reported to have been unable to find a peer-reviewed scientific journal that would publish their paper describing how they claim the Energy Catalyzer operates. Their paper appears only in Rossi's self-published blog, Journal of Nuclear Physics.

In May 2013 a non-peer-reviewed paper describing "results obtained from evaluations of the operation of the E-Cat HT in two test runs" was submitted to the arXiv digital archive. Although the authors of the paper wrote that they were not in control of all of the aspects of the process, they concluded that, even by the most conservative of measurements, the device produced excess heat with a resulting energy density that was at least one order of magnitude, and possibly several, higher than any other conventional energy source. The test was partly funded by the Swedish energy research consortium, Elforsk. Elforsk stated on their website that the results were very remarkable, but that it was highly questionable to speculate whether nuclear transformation had occurred when no access had been provided to the reactants. In a response to the original manuscript archived on arXiv, commentators criticized the testing as not truly independent, described the report as having "characteristics more typically found in pseudo‐scientific texts", and stated that "The authors seem to jump to conclusions fitting pre‐conceived ideas where alternative explanations are possible." Astrophysicist Ethan Siegel commented at ScienceBlogs saying Rossi did not allow the reactants or products to be measured on this occasion. In the previous tests there were not enough ^{62}Ni and ^{64}Ni (the only two nickel isotopes which can fuse with hydrogen), at 3.6% and 0.9% respectively, in the reactants to explain the 10% copper output; these isotope levels are typical of natural copper, rather than of fusion by-product. According to Siegel, Rossi also refused to unplug the machine while it was operating despite it being an easy way to surreptitiously power the device. He also added that the supposedly independent testers had to rely on data supplied by Rossi.

In October 2014 a non-peer-reviewed paper by the same authors as the May 2013 report describes results from evaluations in March 2014 of an upgraded version of the E-Cat which runs at higher temperatures. Unlike previous demonstrations, the test was carried out with monitoring equipment and in a laboratory not supplied by Rossi, and was run over an extended duration (32 days). However, as with the previous report, the authors were not in full control of the process; Rossi intervened during the insertion of the fuel charge, start up of the reactor, shut down of the reactor, and extraction of the spent fuel. Overall, the total excess heat measured was calculated to be well beyond that possible by any conventional, non-nuclear source. In this report, they present analyses of samples of spent fuel, concluding from the isotopes found that "nuclear reactions are therefore indicated to be present in the run process, which however is hard to reconcile with the fact that no radioactivity was detected outside the reactor during the run." Following fuel and ash isotopic analysis, the authors speculate as to isotopes of especially nickel and lithium being part of the reaction, in particular transmutation of ^{58}Ni and ^{60}Ni to ^{62}Ni, and from ^{7}Li to ^{6}Li through some unknown process.

Particle physicist Tommaso Dorigo commented on the 2014 test, called the isotopic measurements "startling" but he expressed deep concern about Rossi being involved in collecting the spent fuel, that the testers may have "overlooked some simple trick" and that "given the extraordinary nature of the claim… this constitutes a major flaw, which totally invalidates any conclusions one might otherwise draw." Astrophysicist Ethan Siegel was highly critical of the test, stating that the testers were not independent, that Rossi could have tampered with the fuel samples, that the 'open calorimeter' setup used was inappropriate, and that "it’s relatively easy to fake the amount of energy being drawn through a power cord if there is a hookup to an external source."

On 31 January 2019, Rossi's company released a new product (E-Cat SK) via live video stream. The product is reported as currently available to be leased by factories as a source of heat. After viewing the video, Tom Casten noted that "The E-Cat demonstration makes giant claims of scientific breakthroughs with no validation". Similarly, the Australian physicist and aerospace engineer Ian Bryce noted that, in the video demonstration, the "inputs, outputs, and measurement points are not defined, making the results largely meaningless", that the nuclear reaction purportedly occurring within the E-Cat SK would "release much deadly radiation. Yet the meters show zero ionizing radiation and no neutrons. Fortunate for the bystanders!" and concludes, regarding Rossi's E-Cat cold fusion device, "there is no real doubt about it being a fake".

== Reactions to the claims ==
Theoretical astrophysicist Ethan Siegel and nuclear physicist Peter Thieberger have pointed out that the claims for the E-Cat are incompatible with the fundamentals of nuclear physics. In particular, the Coulomb barrier for the claimed fusion reaction is so high that it is insurmountable anywhere in the known universe, including the interior of stars. The reaction also would create gamma radiation that would have penetrated the few inches of shielding apparently provided by the E-Cat, inducing acute radiation syndrome in persons in the vicinity of the purported demonstrations. Given numerous other scientific inconsistencies – such as the ratio of isotopes in the supposed copper "fusion product" being identical to that in natural copper – the authors argued that it is now time "for the E-Cat's proponents to provide the provable, testable, reproducible science that can answer these straightforward physics objections."

Peter Ekström, lecturer at the Department of Nuclear Physics at Lund University in Sweden, concluded in May 2011, "I am convinced that the whole story is one big scam, and that it will be revealed in less than one year." He cited the unlikelihood of a chemical reaction being strong enough to overcome the Coulomb barrier, the lack of gamma rays, the lack of explanation for the origin of the extra energy, the lack of the expected radioactivity after fusing a proton with ^{58}Ni, the unexplained occurrence of 11% iron in the spent fuel, the 10% copper in the spent fuel having the same isotopic ratios as natural copper, and the lack of any unstable copper isotope in the spent fuel as if the reactor only produced stable isotopes. Kjell Aleklett, physics professor at Uppsala University, said the percentage of copper was too high for any known reaction of nickel, and the copper had the same isotopic ratio as natural copper. He also stated, "Known chemical reactions cannot explain the amount of energy measured. A nuclear reaction can explain the amount of energy, but the knowledge we have today says that this reaction cannot take place." Scientific skeptic James Randi, discussing the E-Cat in the context of previous cold fusion claims, suggested that it will eventually be proven to be a fraud.

Other cold fusion supporters have been more supportive of the claims. For example, in 2011 Dennis M. Bushnell, Chief Scientist at NASA Langley Research Center, described LENR as a "promising" technology and praised the work of Rossi and Focardi.

Theoretical nuclear physicist Yeong E. Kim of Purdue University has proposed a potential theoretical explanation of the reported results of the device, but has stated that, for confirmation of this theory, "it is very important to carry out Rossi-type experiments independently." Kim had previously put forward this theory to explain the results of the now-discredited Fleischman and Pons cold fusion experiment in 1989.

Steve Featherstone wrote in Popular Science that by the summer of 2012 Rossi's "outlandish claims" for the E-Cat seemed "thoroughly debunked" and that Rossi "looked like a con man clinging to his story to the bitter end."

== Patents ==
An application in 2008 to patent the device internationally received an unfavorable preliminary report on patentability at the World Intellectual Property Organization from the European Patent Office, noting that the description of the device was based on "general statements and speculations" and citing "numerous deficiencies in both the description and in the evidence provided to support its feasibility" as well as incompatibilities with "generally accepted laws of physics and established theories." The patent application was published on 15 October 2009.

On 6 April 2011 an application was approved by the Italian Patent and Trademark Office, which issued a patent for the invention, valid only in Italy. Under then-current Italian law, the examination of the application was more formal and less technical than for the corresponding PCT application.

In March 2014 the US Patent Office replied to Rossi's US patent application with a provisional decision to reject it, saying "The specification is objected to as inoperable. Specifically there is no evidence in the corpus of nuclear science to substantiate the claim that nickel will spontaneously ionize hydrogen gas and therefore 'absorb' the resulting proton".

== Lawsuit ==
In January 2014 a newly formed company, Industrial Heat LLC, announced that it had acquired rights to Rossi's E-Cat technology. In April 2016, Rossi filed a lawsuit in the USA against Industrial Heat, alleging that he was not paid an $89 million licensing fee due after a one-year test period of an E-Cat unit. Industrial Heat's comment on the lawsuit was that after three years of effort they were unable to reproduce Rossi's E-Cat test results. On 5 July 2017 the parties settled; the terms of the settlement were not released.

== See also ==
- Brilliant Light Power
