= PANSW =

PANSW may refer to:

- Police Association of New South Wales
- Pickleball Association New South Wales
