= Industrial action =

Measure taken by organised labour

Industrial action (British English) or job action (American English) is a temporary show of dissatisfaction by employees—especially a strike or slowdown or working to rule—to protest against bad working conditions or low pay and to increase bargaining power with the employer and intended to force the employer to improve them by reducing productivity in a workplace. Industrial action is usually organized by trade unions or other organised labour, most commonly when employees are forced out of work due to contract termination and without reaching an agreement with the employer. Quite often it is used and interpreted as a euphemism for strike or mass strike, but the scope is much wider. Industrial action may take place in the context of a labour dispute or may be meant to effect political or social change. This form of communication tends to be their only means to voice their concerns about safety and benefits.

== Types ==
- Blue flu
- General strike (mass strike)
- Occupation of factories
- Overtime ban
- Picketing
- Slowdown (or Go-slow)
- Strike
- Work-to-rule

== See also ==
- Civil resistance
- Nonviolent resistance
