= Andrea Rossi (entrepreneur) =

Italian entrepreneur (born 1950)

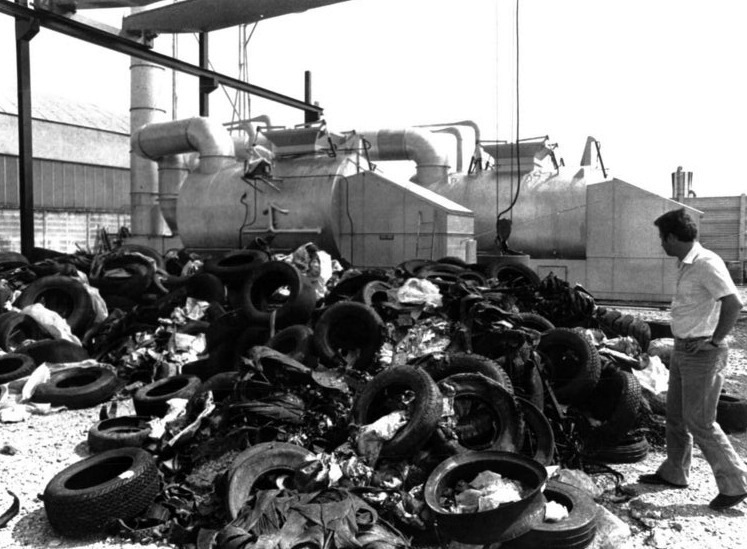
- Born: June 3, 1950 (age 76); Milan, Italy
- Education: University of Milan (1973)
- Known for: Petroldragon, energy catalyzer

Andrea Rossi (born 3 June 1950) is an Italian entrepreneur who claimed to have invented a cold fusion device.

In the 1970s, Rossi claimed to have invented a process to convert organic waste into petroleum, and in 1978 he founded a company named Petroldragon to implement waste processing technology. In 1989, the company was shut down by the Italian government amid allegations of fraud, and Rossi was arrested. In 1996, Rossi moved to the United States and from 2001 to 2003 he worked under a U.S. Army contract to make a thermoelectric device that, while promising to be superior to other devices, produced only around 1/1000 of the claimed performance.

In 2008, Rossi attempted to patent a device called an Energy Catalyzer (or E-Cat), which was a purported cold fusion or Low-Energy Nuclear Reaction (LENR) thermal power source. Rossi claimed that the device produces massive amounts of excess heat that could be used to produce electricity, but independent attempts to reproduce the effect failed.

== Biography ==
Andrea Rossi was born on 3 June 1950, in Milan. In 1973, Rossi graduated in philosophy at the University of Milan writing a thesis on Albert Einstein's theory of relativity and its interrelationship with Edmund Husserl's phenomenology. Although Rossi also holds a degree in chemical engineering, this degree was granted by Kensington University in California, which was later shut down as a diploma mill.

Andrea Rossi is married to Maddalena Pascucci.

== Business ventures ==
=== Petroldragon ===
In 1974, Rossi registered a patent for an incineration system. In 1978, he wrote The Incineration of Waste and River Purification, published in Milan by Tecniche Nuove. He then founded Petroldragon, a company that was paid to process toxic waste, claiming to use Rossi's process to convert the waste into usable petroleum products. In 1989, Italian customs seized several Petroldragon waste deposit sites and assets. Investigations showed that petroleum supposedly produced by the company had never been placed on the market, and that mixtures of toxic waste and harmful chemical solvents were being stored in silos or illegally dumped into the environment. Rossi himself was arrested and eventually tried on 56 counts, five of which ended in convictions related to tax fraud. As of 2004, the government of Lombardy had spent over forty million euros to dispose of the 70,000 tonnes of toxic waste that Petroldragon had improperly dumped.

=== Electricity from waste heat ===
In the US, Rossi started the consulting firm Leonardo Technologies, Inc. (LTI). He secured a defence contract to evaluate the potential of generating electricity from waste heat by using thermoelectric generators. Such devices are normally only used for heating or cooling (Peltier effect), because the efficiency for generating electrical power is only a few per cent. Rossi suggested that his devices could attain 20% efficiency. Larger modules would be manufactured in Italy. Rossi sent 27 thermoelectric devices for evaluation to the Engineer Research and Development Center; 19 of these did not produce any electricity at all. The remaining units produced less than one watt each, instead of the expected 800–1000 watts.

=== Energy Catalyzer ===
In January 2011, Andrea Rossi and Sergio Focardi claimed to have demonstrated commercially viable nuclear power in a device he called an Energy Catalyzer. The international patent application received an unfavourable international preliminary report on patentability because it seemed to "offend against the generally accepted laws of physics and established theories", and to overcome this problem, the application should have contained either experimental evidence or a firm theoretical basis in current scientific theories.

In February 2012, Australian aviator and sceptic Dick Smith offered Rossi US$1 million if Rossi could prove his device generated output many times input, as he had claimed. The offer lapsed, as Rossi had declined to take up the challenge.

In 2014, the U.S. company Industrial Heat LLC acquired rights to the device, but later became involved in a legal dispute with Rossi, who asserted that licensing fees had not been paid. Industrial Heat countered that they had been unable to reproduce the claimed results, and the case was eventually settled out of court on undisclosed terms.

== See also ==
- Fischer–Tropsch process
- Low energy nuclear reaction
- Thermal depolymerization
