= Slowdown =

Industrial action

A slowdown (UK: go-slow) is an industrial action in which employees perform their duties but seek to reduce productivity or efficiency in their performance of these duties. A slowdown may be used as either a prelude or an alternative to a strike, as it is seen as less disruptive as well as less risky and costly for workers and their union. Striking workers usually go unpaid and risk being replaced, so a slowdown is seen as a way to put pressure on management while avoiding these outcomes. Other times slowdowns are accompanied by acts of sabotage on the part of workers to provide further disruption.

Nonetheless, workers participating in a slowdown are often punished, sometimes by firing and other times by law.

== Examples ==
At Ford's plant in Dagenham, UK, during the 1970s, workers introduced a go-slow after Ford management increased the production line speed from 18 to 21 feet per minute. This was a second speed increase, and workers felt that this was unfair. After a go-slow by production line staff, Ford management reduced the line speed back to 18 feet per minute.

In July 2011, Qantas engineers introduced an unusual slowdown where right-handed engineers used only their left hands to operate essential tools.

== Rule-book slowdown ==
Another form of slowdown is known as the rule-book slowdown. This refers to the "rule books" that govern workers' actions, usually either for safety or quality purposes. In practice, many rules are loosely interpreted in the interest of efficiency. A union seeking to employ a slowdown tactic may take advantage of these common rule oversights by having workers "work to rule", obeying each and every rule to the fullest extent, which consequently will greatly reduce productivity.

This has the advantage of allowing workers and unions to claim that no malfeasance is being committed, since they are doing only what the management's rules actually require them to do. For instance, many subways are required to keep doors open for a certain amount of time at each stop, whereas in practice doors are often closed sooner. Likewise, a bus driver typically may take the same liberties with traffic law that drivers do, and are often overloaded with passengers, while an experienced pilot can safely fly in some inclement weather. In a "rule-book" slowdown, the bus driver may drive more slowly and conservatively and with a proper passenger load, while the pilot may refuse to fly in mildly inclement weather.

Slowdowns are related to but can be distinguished from work-to-rule, another action in which workers refuse to perform more than their required duties.

== See also ==
- De-policing, police force slowdown
