= NSW Police Legacy =

- NSW Police Legacy Logo
- Formation: 1987
- Founded at: Sydney NSW 2000
- Type: Nonprofit organisation
- Legal status: Charity
- Headquarters: Sydney NSW 2000
- Region served: NSW
- Chair: Det Supt Donna McCarthy APM
- Affiliations: NSW Police Force, Police Association of New South Wales
- Website: www.policelegacynsw.org.au

NSW Police Legacy is a charitable organisation that was established in 1987 to care for the widows, widowers, partners and children of deceased members of the NSW Police Force. The charity was originally established with assistance from the NSW Premier, and the Police Association of New South Wales. NSW Police Legacy has now expanded its reach to care also for the parents of deceased officers, special constables, and serving and retired police facing difficult circumstances.

== Fundraising ==
NSW Police Legacy receives no government funding. It depends on donations and fundraising events to finance its programs. Major annual events the organisation runs include the Blue Ribbon Ball, the Remembrance Bike Ride, the annual Kokoda Trek, and the Police Boxing event. There are numerous other small events held by individuals and Local Area Commands in support of the organisation.

== Services ==
NSW Police Legacy supports its legatees through financial assistance in the form of education grants and scholarships, welfare grants to families or individuals facing need, retraining for returning to the workforce, and funding for counselling. It also provides social support in the form of camps for young legatees, parental support networks, welfare checks, local area lunches, Christmas lunches, annual family day, and remembrance days.

== BACKUP for Life ==
In 2016, as a joint project of NSW Police Legacy and the NSW state government, the BACKUP for Life program was established. The program assisted former police officers with mentoring and counselling services, career coaching and referrals, a careers incentive scheme, and assistance as they transitioned back into civilian life. Funding for the program was discontinued in July 2021, as the NSW Police Force expanded its career transition program.
