= De-policing =

Police disengaging from active police work

De-policing is a term for police disengaging from active police work, generally as a reaction to external scrutiny or negative publicity. A form of work slowdown, de-policing represents a de facto police strike, in which the police withdraw an aspect of their crime prevention services. It is a practical police protest at perceived political interference in their day-to-day task of policing.

Conservative author Heather Mac Donald offered another interpretation for the term "de-policing". In her book The War on Cops, she used the term as the antithesis for pro-active policing in general. In the light of the 2014 killing of Eric Garner in Staten Island, New York, and criticism of "broken windows" policing, MacDonald used the term de-policing to describe the NYPD's policy of backing away from actively pursuing stop-and-frisk procedures as a primary method of crime prevention.

According to a 2019 study, there is no evidence that de-policing contributes to city homicide rates. A 2017 FBI study suggested that law enforcement felt a "chill wind" after several high-profile police killings in recent years—especially the 2014 shooting of Michael Brown in Ferguson, Missouri. The study noted the stance of politicians, the media, and the broader social movement making people feel that it was acceptable "to challenge and discredit law enforcement actions"; and proposed that these circumstances have demoralized police officers and led them to do less on the job. In a 2017 survey by Pew Research Center, 86% of police officers said they believed that police killings of African Americans had made policing more difficult.

Recent court decisions like Ligon and Floyd have also contributed to the atmosphere of de-policing in many American cities, but particularly New York City. Cities like Ferguson, Missouri and Baltimore, Maryland have been similarly affected due to what is perceived as unfair and aggressive policing in minority communities.

== See also ==
- Police strike
- Ferguson effect
