= Australian Federal Police Association =

Trade union for Australian police

AFPA
- Australian Federal Police Association
- Headquarters: 3/53 Blackall Street Griffith, ACT, Australia
- Location: Australia
- Key people: Alex Caruana (National President)
- Affiliations: Police Federation of Australia
- Website: www.afpa.org.au

The Australian Federal Police Association (AFPA) is a registered Industrial Organisation under the Fair Work Act 2009 operating as a Branch of the Police Federation of Australia. The AFPA has sole autonomous political and industrial coverage for all employees within the Australian Federal Police which includes sworn Federal Agents; Police Officers; Protective Service Officers; and non-sworn support staff deployed nationally and overseas. The Australian Federal Police Association also provides industrial coverage for the Australian Crime Commission and the Australian Commission for Law Enforcement Integrity.

== History ==
Between 1942 and 1982 the industrial interests of the Commonwealth law enforcement were represented by the Defence Establishments Guard Association (1942–1943), the Peace Officer Guard Association (1943–1958), and the Commonwealth Police Officers' Association (1958–1982). The ACT Police Officers' Association (1933–1979) and subsequently the Federal Police Association (1979–1982) represented the industrial interests of the ACT police until 1982.

In July 1982 the Australian Federal Police Association (AFPA) was established following a merger between the Commonwealth Police Officers' Association [CPOA] and the Federal Police Association [FPA]. The impetus for the AFPA was the proclamation of the Australian Federal Police Act on 15 June 1979 that established the Australian Federal Police [AFP]. The AFP was a merger of the Commonwealth police, Narcotics Bureau and the ACT police.

In 1998 the AFPA changed its rules to establish the Police Federation of Australia, which now incorporates Branches for all State, Territory and Federal Police and is affiliated with the Australian Council of Trade Unions (ACTU). The PFA is the peak lobbying body on behalf of all Australian Police Associations/unions. The PFA provides additional research & lobbying capacity for the AFPA on an ongoing basis.

The AFPA is affiliated with Australia's national police charity, the AUSPOL – Police Welfare Foundation.

== Member services ==
The AFPA National office provides its members with a full range of services including:

- Industrial support;
- Legal support including full funding for federal and criminal court matters (subject to legal advice)
- Non-exclusion based life assurance cover
- Trauma Cover
- Group Journey Injury Cover
- Welfare support;
- AUSPOL health plan;
- Discount services;

The AFPA also lobbies government on a variety of law enforcement issues.

== Federal policing issues ==
=== The Haneef Inquiry ===
The AFPA made substantial contributions to the debate surrounding the detainment of Dr Mohamed Haneef . AFPA CEO Jim Torr (Resigned October 2012) stated that the AFPA's members were tired of the negative public comments about the AFP Commissioner and the Australian Federal Police that were pre-emptive of the Clarke Inquiry Report.

In their submission to the Clarke Inquiry the AFPA recommended that the Australian Federal Police be placed under the scrutiny of a Parliamentary Joint (statutory) Committee. The Australian Government responded to the Clarke Inquiry Report by accepting the recommendations of the AFPA, undertaking to create a Parliamentary Joint Committee on Law Enforcement to extend parliamentary oversight to include the Australian Federal Police and enabling the Joint Committee on Intelligence and Security to extend inquiries to include the Australian Federal Police.

=== The Federal Audit of Policing Capabilities ===
In May 2009, the AFPA made its major report titled 'Enforcing Against Risk' to the Federal Audit of Policing Capabilities which was commissioned by the Minister for Home Affairs, the Hon. Bob Debus MP in January 2009 to report by the end of June 2009.

The detailed Report makes several recommendations for the reform about the way that federal law enforcement agencies meet emerging expectations and strategic risks during the global recession. In particular, the AFPA's submission updates and expands upon the AFPA's Nationally Integrated Commonwealth Law Enforcement Model (NICLE), which had been largely implemented by the Commonwealth Government since the Senate Legal and Constitutional Affairs Committee's 'Inquiry into the Management Arrangements and Adequacy of Funding of the Australian Federal Police and the National Crime Authority' in August 2001.

== BlueStar ==
The BlueStar Magazine is a publication of the Australian Federal Police Association with articles about the professional issues of the Federal Police for public dissemination.
