= Sergio Focardi =

Italian physicist (1932–2013)

- Born: 1932; Florence, Italy
- Died: 22 June 2013 (aged 80–81); Bologna, Italy
- Scientific career
- Fields: Physics
- Institutions: University of Bologna in Bologna

Sergio Focardi (1932 – 22 June 2013) was an Italian physicist and professor emeritus at the University of Bologna. He led the Department of Bologna of the (Italian) National Institute for Nuclear Physics and the Faculty of Mathematical, Physical and Natural Sciences at the University of Bologna.

In the early 1960s Focardi spent time at CERN in Geneva.

He was a member of the President's Board of the Italian Physical Society. From 1992 he had been working on cold fusion with nickel-hydrogen reactors. From 2007 until his death, Focardi collaborated with inventor Andrea Rossi on the development of the Energy Catalyzer (E-Cat).

== Studies on nickel-hydrogen exothermal systems ==
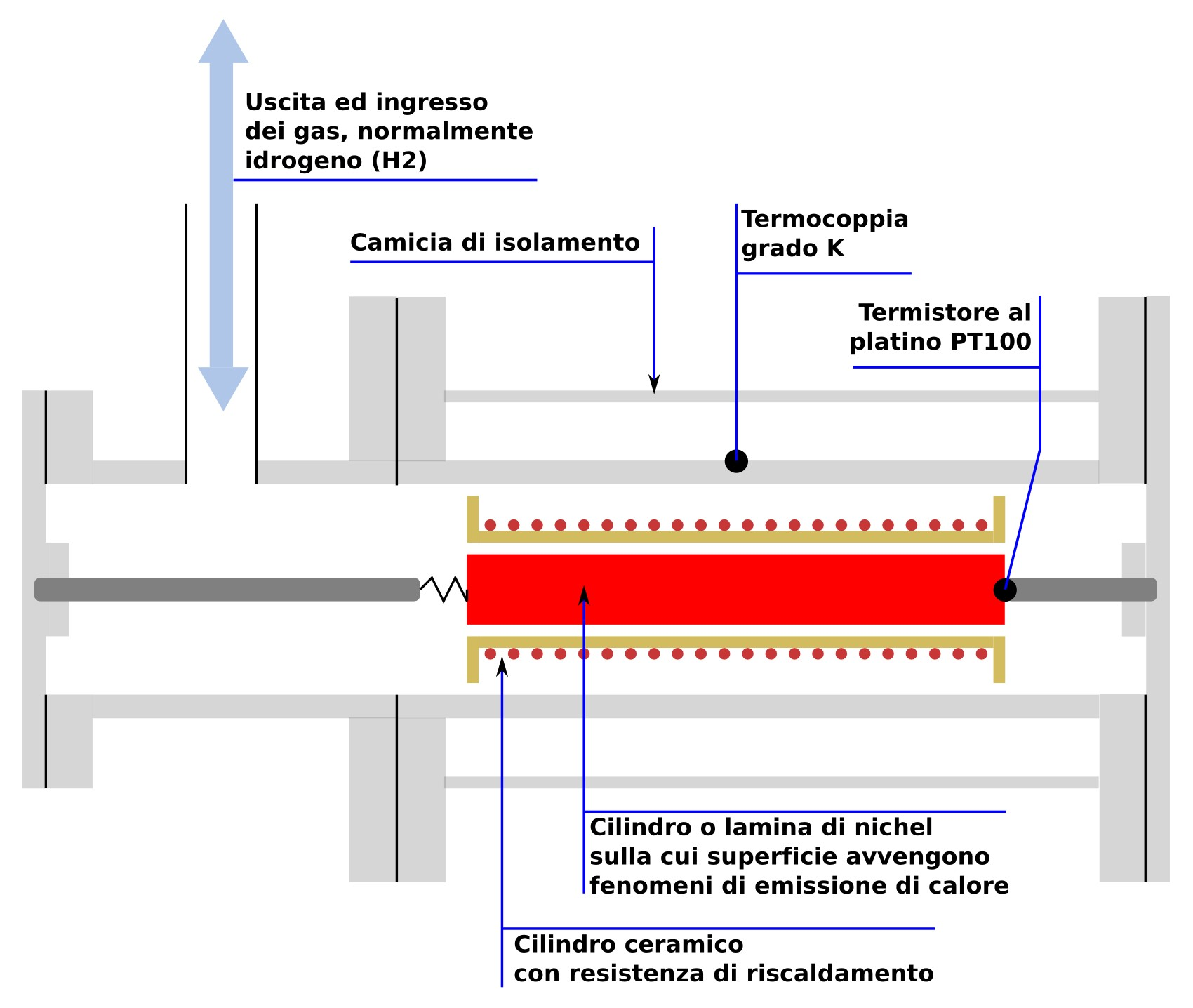
Diagram of the reactor devised by Focardi et al.

In the early 90s Sergio Focardi, together with physicists Roberto Habel and Francesco Piantelli, started to develop a nickel-hydrogen exothermal reactor. The results of their research were presented in 1994, and published on the peer-reviewed scientific journal Il Nuovo Cimento A.

== See also ==
- Energy Catalyzer
