= Police Federation of Australia =

Australian police trade union

PFA
- Police Federation of Australia
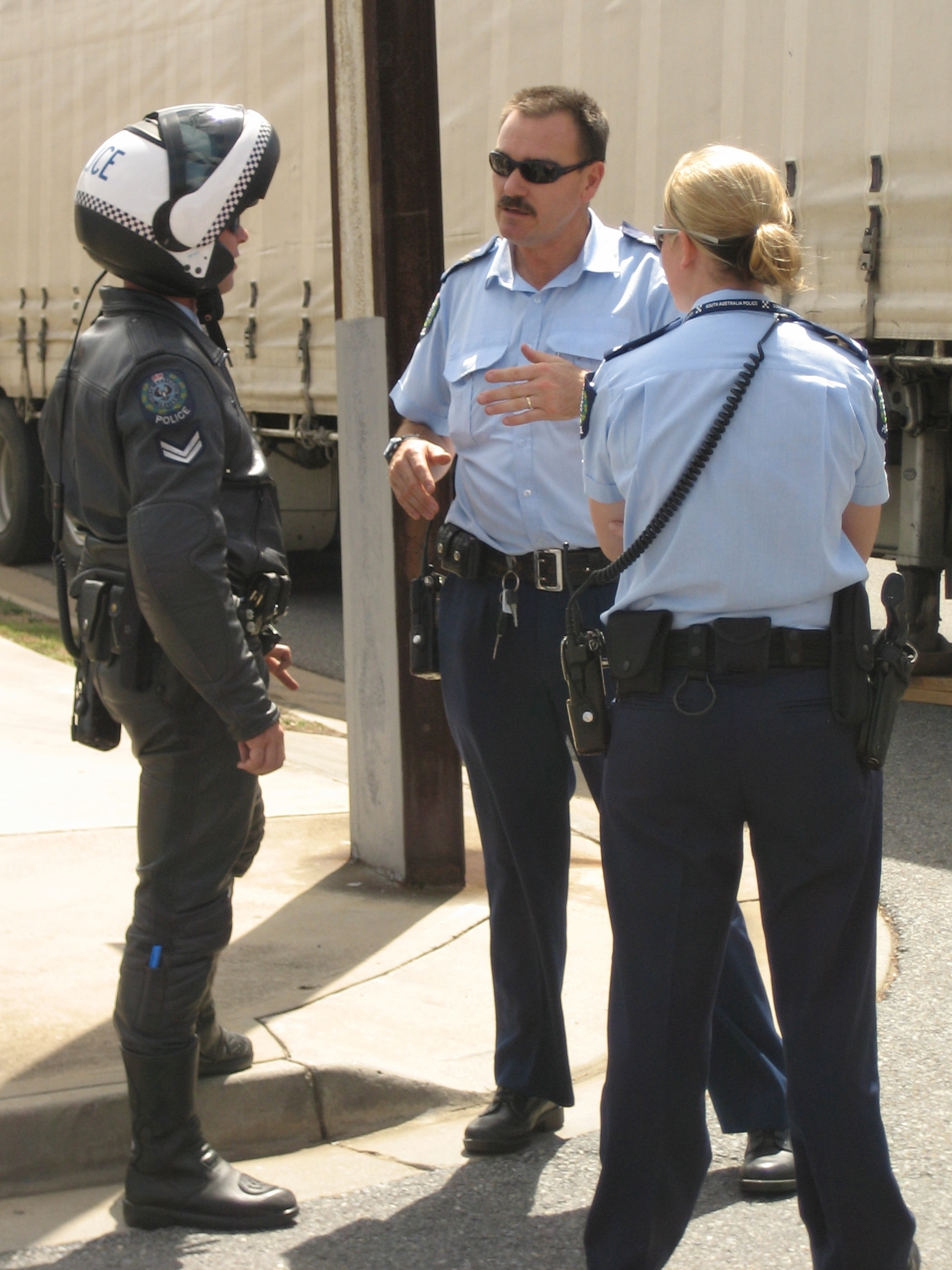
- South Australian police officers
- Founded: 1 January 1998
- Headquarters: Canberra, ACT
- Location: Australia
- Members: ▲65,373 (as at 31 December 2024)
- Key people: Kevin Morton, President; Scott Weber, Chief Executive Officer
- Website: pfa.org.au

The Police Federation of Australia (PFA) is a peak police union body that represents the interests of Australian police officers.

It was formerly registered under the Workplace Relations Act 1996 on 1 January 1998. The Canberra office was opened by John Howard, the then Prime Minister of Australia, on Tuesday, 16 September 2003.

The members of each State, Territory and Federal Police Association/Union are members of the Police Federation of Australia, and the organisation was affiliated with the ACTU. The role of the PFA is to protect and promote the workings and interests of those police officers, should any requirement be needed for their representation. This is enacted by being the "National Voice of Policing." In 2007, Peter Alexander (the then President of the Police Federation of Australia) said the union represented 50,000 officers. As of December 2018, the PFA represented over 63,000 members nationally, which gives it the greatest density level of membership of any union organisation within Australia.

In 2002 the CEO of the Police Federation of Australia, Mark Burgess, called for a national approach to tackling the problems of hand guns in the community "I think there needs to be a far greater cooperation and coordination between the Federal Government and the State and Territory Governments. We've said for some time it's unfortunate these things are finding their way into the country and then it's left to State and Territory police officers to clean up the mess and the carnage after they've been used."

In 2005 the Police Federation of Australia supported the fears of the Australian Federal Police Association (AFPA), regarding industrial relations laws relating to Australian Workplace Agreements saying the laws could erode the integrity of police officers. The concerns were rejected by a spokesman for Workplace Relations Minister Kevin Andrews, saying state police would remain in the state systems, and that AFP staff would continue to be governed by their certified agreement.

== Office Bearers ==
President – Kevin Morton (PANSW), Vice President – Alex Caruana (AFPA), Vice President – Nathan Finn (NTPA), Treasurer – Wade Burns (PASA), Chief Executive Officer – Scott Weber.

== Branches ==
- Australian Federal Police Association
- Police Association of New South Wales
- Northern Territory Police Association
- Queensland Police Union
- Police Association of Victoria
- Police Association of South Australia
- WA Police Union
- Police Association of Tasmania

== History ==
Although it has only recently been established, the PFA has an important history. The PFA was formally registered under Federal Industrial Law on 1 January 1998. The Canberra office, which is still in use to this day, was opened on 16 September 2003 by the Prime Minister at that time, John Howard. Prior to being properly formed as the Federation, the Australian Federal Police Association was the only registered police union federally in Australia at the time. The association came into effect as a result of restructuring of Commonwealth law enforcement along with the creation of the Australian Federal Police. The Association's national executive committee agreed upon the idea of a national law enforcement union in 1986 as a sole trade union. Through much deliberation and after numerous meetings and countless objections, by state governments and individual police commissioners, the final phase in the formation was the formal change from association to federation. In April 1997, the associations council unanimously agreed that the union change its name to the Police Federation of Australia.

== Union Merger ==
An important moment in the history of the PFA was the merger of the union from being individual state unions to a much more nationally recognised organisation, broadening police union agendas to include external issues and industrial matters. This is combined with a much greater depth and width of interaction with officers. The merger occurred at the time of the national labour movement within Australia, highlighting the political climate at the time of the merger. Police unionists in Australia insist, however, that their institutions be run by police officers rather than trade union professionals. In spite of the fact that police unions were affiliated to the Australian Council of Trade Unions (ACTU) through the PFA. The PFA and their branches do not associate themselves with any specific political party or ideology. Throughout the course of police unionism, the issue of professionalism had been on the agenda for some time. Following the national merger in 1998, the PFA has pursued with intent, the goals of professional mobility, nationally recognised standards and consistent training outcomes.

== Importance of the Union ==
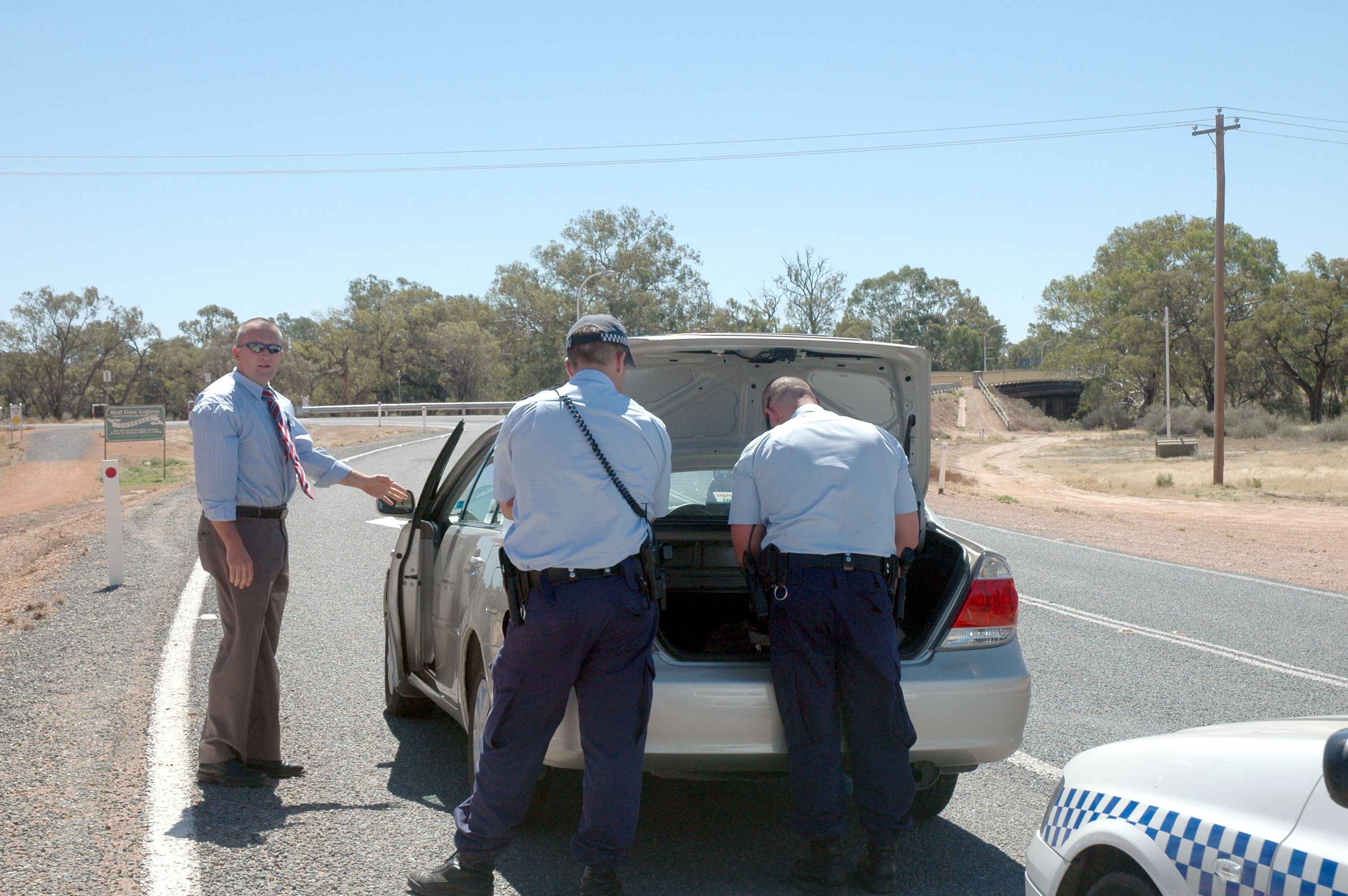
New South Wales Police Officers in action conducting a vehicle search for illegal drugs.

The importance of the Police Federation of Australia is held at a high regard for its members and other members of the community. The importance of the union, particularly for those who are in the law enforcement sectors of society such as police, is paramount for their survival. In the case of redundancies for example, or other incidents that may implicate an officers job or livelihood, the use of the union will be necessary in defending those members and employees, should they need the services of the union. The importance of the Union is based upon the role of the federation and how important it is. The PFA has the potential to be a powerful, industrial and political influence in the field of law enforcement. While most Unions appear to have the idea of industrial unionism as the main function, this would not be the case for the Federation as a national entity.

Rather, the main purpose of the PFA was that of a professional association for police and law enforcement personnel. While the industrial activities were more left to the autonomous branches and/or the individuals State and territories Police Unions. An issue that has been of importance for the PFA is the issue of professionalism within the police force. This issue has been very much at the forefront of the PFA's agenda in being reached. The promotion of professionalism is currently occurring within the PFA and the PFA is actively involved in a number of these activities. These activities include; the establishment of an Australian police service delivery code of conduct, the development of strategies and processes for the transition of training and education delivery from the vocational to the tertiary sector as well as the identification of a model and enabling mechanisms to facilitate inter-jurisdictional mobility at rank. The PFA is also undertaking the notion of untying the link between police pay and police promotion. The idea behind this movement is for police to be paid for what they do rather than officers chasing promotions, much like other sections of the workforce where rank doesn't play an important part such as the police force. This is aiming to retain experienced police officers in the force who are not promoted. It is also viewed by the union as a means of rewarding and encouraging those who are experienced and operational police officers to work in locations and jobs which are hard to fill.

== Member Services ==
Police officers on a daily basis have to deal with a wide range of issues within the community. One of those issues, more prevalent than ever today is the issue surrounding mental health. Due to their 24/7 nature, police officers in Australia have been expected to deal with persons presenting with symptoms of mental health disorders within the community. The complexity of these issues has generated a stretch in police resources. This also includes their own mental health when it comes to dealing with these extreme and disturbing signs. Some of these extreme examples include police involved shootings of mentally ill individuals. There has been increased commentary regarding issues that officers face and their mental health. In response to this trend, many officers nationally have expressed their concerns over feeling there is a lack of necessary skills, knowledge and resources to respond and assess appropriately to individuals with mental illness. The consensus amongst officers is that this lack of resources stems from deficient deinstitutionalisation reforms that overtime have crippled Australia's mental health system. This creates the overburden mentioned for police officers on the front line as responders to mental health issues. This also accounts for police officers regarding simply having to deal with mental health issues in the community. A 2004 survey found that 93% of police officers stated that 'caring for people with a mental illness is affecting their ability to do core work responsibilities.' Furthermore, this involvement by police with mental health in the community extends to further boundaries. There is evidence to suggest that officers spend substantial amounts of time across numerous hospitals in the emergency departments in so-called caretaker mode. This effect upon police to wait is due to having to wait for these persons of interest to be properly admitted to a health specialist who can gauged whether they are to be experiencing mental illness or a mental health crisis. These frustrations have been expressed by the Police Federation of Australia and that they impede upon the work of many of the police officers they represent nationally.

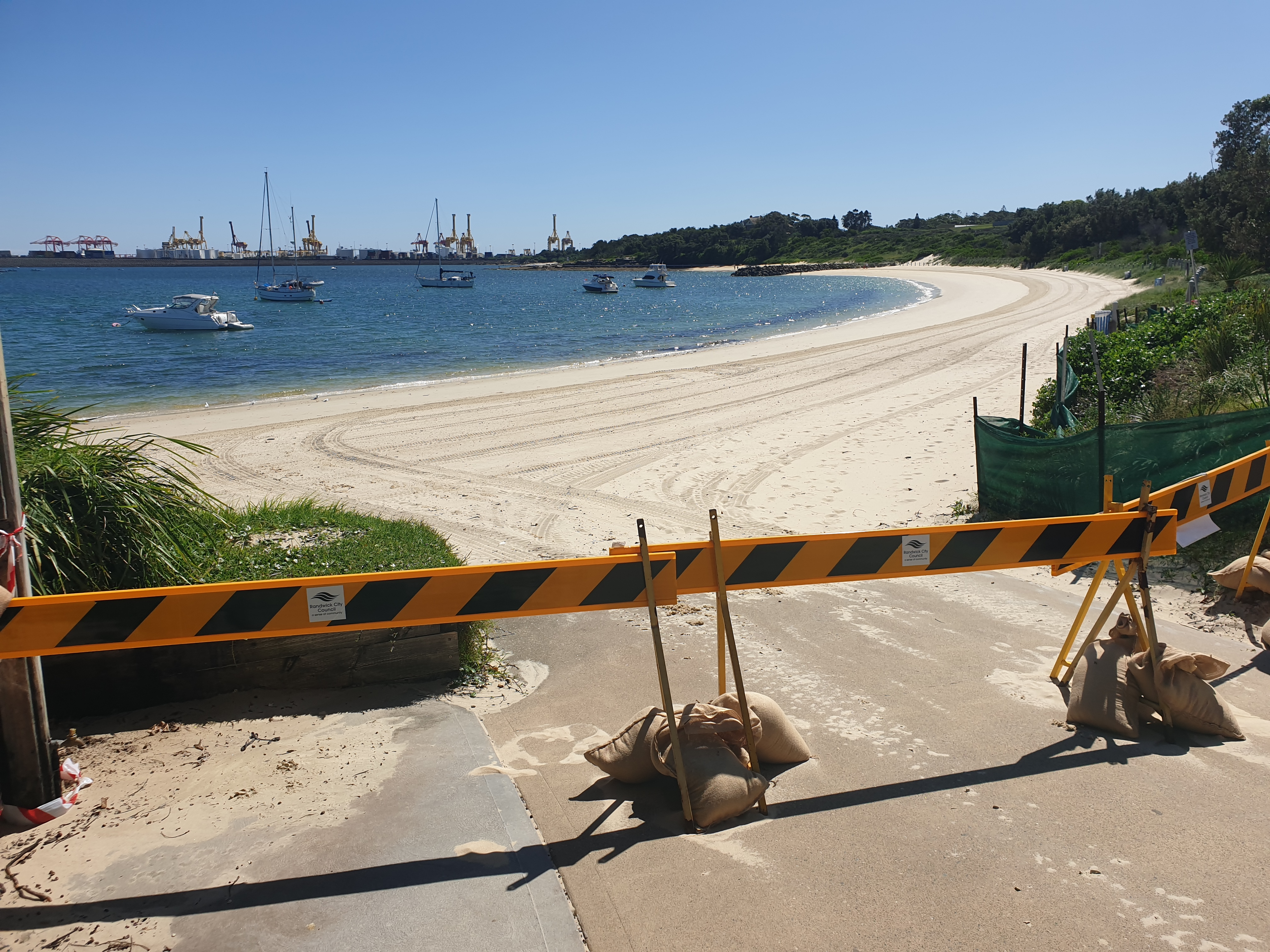
La Perouse Beach in the Eastern Suburbs of Sydney, Randwick City Council, closed due to the COVID-19 pandemic.

As a result of the COVID-19 pandemic, police in Australia have had an important role in protecting the citizens. Police have been the main enforcers of social distancing measures within each of the states and territories. This has put police officers on the very front-line when it comes to interaction with people in the community. Many of these roles had the PFA focusing on the wellbeing of the police officers. This included the monitoring of cruise ships and dealing with those passengers, controlling state borders as well as issuing fines to those who violates the social distancing measures. An important aspect of the measures taken was to stop people from gathering in public places. Most notably, it was prevalent at many of the beaches in the Eastern Suburbs (Sydney) and Northern Beaches of Sydney. Beaches were talked about as being an important place for police officers to show their presence in the aim of warning people off breaching social distancing and attaining a fine. Particularly at a time where being outside is deemed at being dangerous and only for essential purposes. Some of the social distancing rules that were put in place were confusing to some. Many of the police officers were learning of these changes by finding out through the media. The Chief Executive Officer of the PFA, Scott Weber, highlighted that the situation in the community was "a moving feast every day". Weber then further stated, "When the restrictions were out in place, it was quite clear it was extremely urgent and extremely necessary, and police were very clear with regards to being black and white in enforcing those restrictions". Due to the role that the police had, the restrictions were regarded to have started to work. Scott Weber also stated that "at the start it was very prescriptive, it was health orientated, and on top of that – people didn’t know where we were heading". The union backed their officers by taking the situation very seriously and were following the measures put in place for the safety of the community.

== See also ==
- 1923 Victorian Police strike
