= Global security law =

French law proposal

Loi relative à la sécurité globale

National Assembly
- Territorial extent: France
- Enacted by: National Assembly
- Enacted by: Senate

Legislative history

First chamber: National Assembly
- Bill citation: JORF n° 0120 du 26 mai 2021 (in French)
- Introduced by: Jean Castex
- Introduced: 20 October 2020
- First reading: 4 November 2020 – 24 November 2020
- Second reading: 15 April 2021

Second chamber: Senate
- First reading: 3 March 2020 – 18 March 2021
- Status: In force

The global security law is a French legislative text promulgated on 25 May 2021. It is intended to

- grant municipal police departments more autonomy,
- permit police live-feed access to body cameras as worn by policemen, as well as footage from drones, and
- protect members of the police force (and their relatives) from off-duty attacks by allowing them to bear their service weapon even off-duty, as well as by restricting naming and photography of policemen (and their relatives).

The last point is primarily regulated in the law's Article 24 giving the bill the nickname Article 24 in public discourse.

== Summary ==
The bill is structured by 7 titles. The law's articles are enumerated from 1 to 32, some of which are further subdivided by letters. The bill mostly amends other laws, such as the Code pénal. Many provisions are made “on an experimental basis” implying that not all of them are rolled out nationwide in order to keep a control group for comparison.

=== Municipal police ===
Articles 1 to 6 outline and grant municipal police full judicial policing authority if the municipality employs more than 15 policemen. This is supposed to speed up processes. Previously, all crimes had to be reported to the national police first.

=== Private security companies ===
Articles 7 to 19d concern private security companies. Private security guards have to fulfill more qualifications in order to do their job.

=== Video surveillance ===
The articles 20 through 21 provide a common set of provisions for remote access to body cameras, police cameras and street CCTV monitoring systems. Articles 22 through 22b authorize police to deploy police drones for monitoring.

The use of mobile cameras was allowed since 2016, but previously access to recordings required a warranted reason, such as investigating an incident. Deployment of UAVs did not have any legal basis at all, but nevertheless were recently used more often.

=== Law enforcement ===
Article 24 makes it illegal to photograph law enforcement officers with the intention of “threatening [their] physical or psychological integrity.”

=== Transportation ===
Articles 28 through 29b introduce more video surveillance options in public transit and on roads.

=== Miscellaneous ===
Articles 30 to 30c contain miscellaneous.

=== Overseas adjustments ===
Special provisions were made for France's overseas territories in articles 31 to 31d.

== Response ==
The law is backed by the governing party. Law enforcement officers were increasingly facing harassment, in particular via online social media. The police unions UNSA and Alliance Police nationale support the bill. The latter, the APN, claims the safety of law enforcement members was closely related to France's security and demands even more extensive measures.

However, since its proposal, the law was protested by over 100,000 citizens,

and has been met with criticism and protests by journalist and civil rights organizations.

In order to coordinate efforts, on 8 November 2020, many organizations united in the collective Stop Loi Sécurité Globale. Amnesty International, CNCDH, Quadrature du net, and the UNHCR see civil liberties under attack. Public outcry has been mainly over increased surveillance (Articles 21 and 22) and the potential criminalization of journalists reporting on police actions and by-standers who simply choose to film police without any malicious intent. Fewer documentation would thus decrease police accountability. Although not mentioned in the bill, the Federation of Labor Unions cgt, Amnesty International, and LQDN, among others, criticize that “processing” of imagery could entail facial recognition, thus putting citizens under general suspicion.

== Progress ==
The law was drawn up by the members of the National Assembly Alice Thourot (LREM, Drôme) and Jean-Michel Fauvergue (LREM, Seine-et-Marne), a former commander of a RAID police unit.

On 20 October 2020, examination of the text began in an accelerated procedure which requires only one lecture by the parliament and subsequent approval by the senate. The national consultative commission on human rights of France sees the repeated use of accelerated procedure as a decline of democratic debate.

During the parliament's session on 24 November 2020, the proposal was adopted with a support of 388 yeas, versus 104 nays, and 66 in abstention. Most members of the ruling party LREM («En Marche!») voted in support for the bill, whilst most votes against were cast by parties belonging to the left spectrum; 10 votes against also came from LREM members.

Following mass protests, the most controversial Article 24 was reworded by the Law Commission of the French Senate. Initially any distribution of photographs was penalized. The new wording rather focuses on “causing the identification” of subjects.

France's upper house, The Senate, unanimously approved the amended bill on 18 March 2021, the Day of Political Prisoners. On 15 April 2021, the National Assembly confirmed the changed version with 75 yeas and 33 nays.

In France a law has to be promulgated within 15 days after its final adoption. However, the deadline is suspended if the law is referred to the Constitutional Council. Opposing organizations and local governments had already preemptively announced to call the Constitutional Council.

In its decision of 20 May 2021, the Constitutional Council recognized partial unconstitutionality.

With unconstitutional provisions removed, the law was promulgated and published on 25 and 26 May 2021 respectively.

== See also ==
- Police, Crime, Sentencing and Courts Bill, a UK policing and justice law that evoked protests in about the same time frame
