= Linda Kebbab =

French police unionist

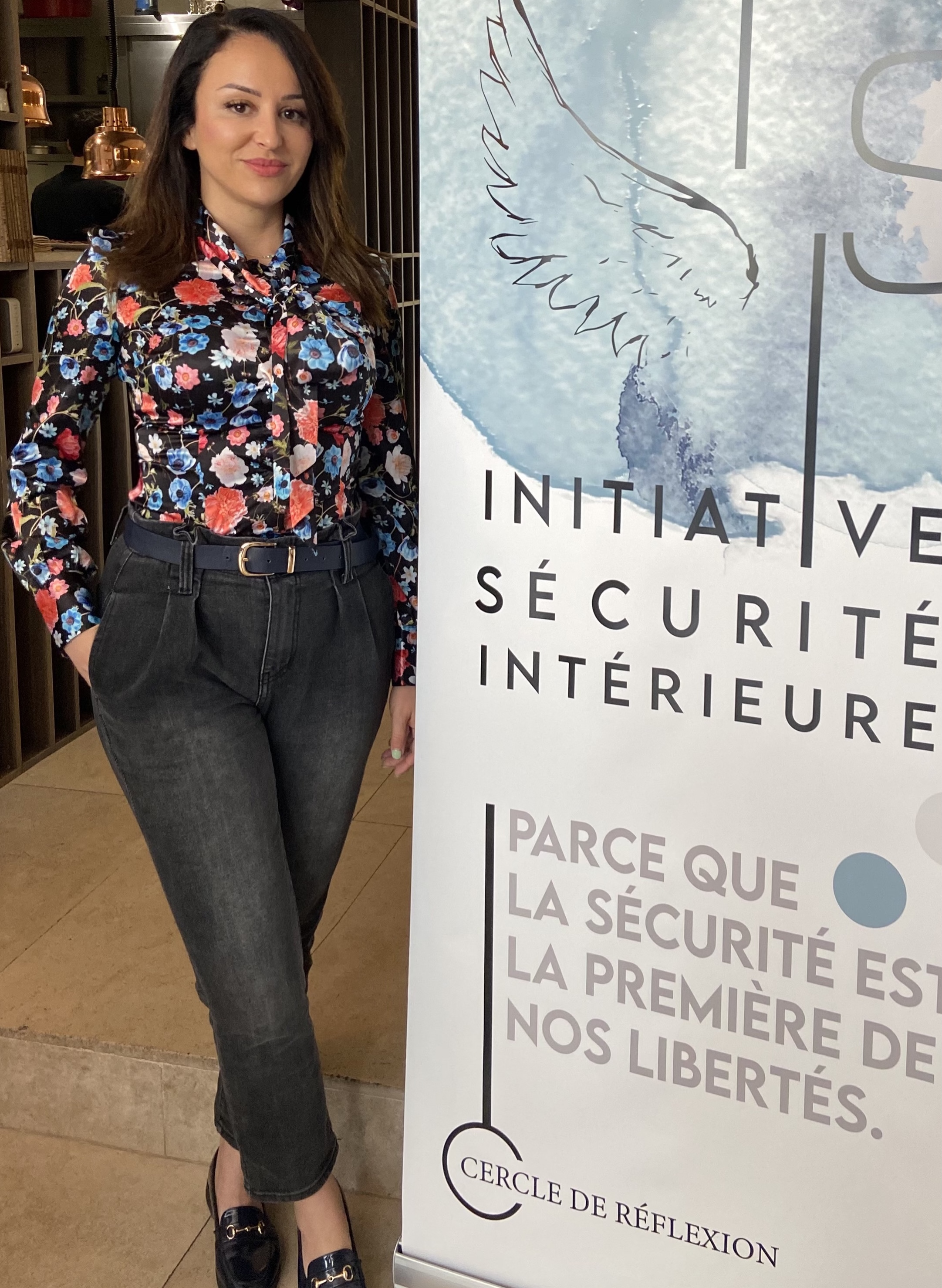
- Linda Kebbab in 2021
- Born: 1981 (age 44–45); Vaulx-en-Velin, France
- Known for: Policewoman, union member

Linda Kebbab (born 1981) is a French police unionist. She has been a national delegate of the UN1TÉ union since 2018. She is vice-president of the Initiative Sécurité Intérieure think tank, which she co-founded in 2021.

== Biography ==
Linda Kebbab was born in the suburbs of Lyon to two Algerian immigrant parents . Her father was a garbage collector and her mother was a housewife.

She is fluent in Algerian dialectal Arabic, she continued her language studies in English, literary Arabic and Russian, but gave up on becoming a reporter after her mother's death. She then ran a textile import-export company, but wanted to feel of "public utility".

A single parent, she joined the police in 2007 after joining the École nationale de police in Fos-sur-Mer. She was first assigned to a police rescue brigade in Créteil. She joined the UN1TÉ SGP Police-Force Ouvrière union, of which she became a national delegate in 2018, just before the Yellow vests protests.

A regular on television sets, Linda Kebbab regularly defends the police. In 2020, Valeurs actuelles described her as a “key figure in the media world”, even though she believes that “police officers who speak out are subject to pressure”.

She supports the proposed law on global security and in particular its controversial article 24.

In 2020, she published her autobiography, in which she notably addressed the Yellow Vest movement, which left more than 27,000 injured, including 1,944 in the police ranks.

== Prizes ==
In 2021, Linda Kebbab won the Favorite category of the Patricia Chapelotte Woman of Influence award.

Her book Guardian of Peace and Revolt, published by Stock, received the prize for the best work on the world of labour.

== Legal affairs ==
Following her media appearances, Linda Kebbab is regularly threatened and attacked on social media.

In 2018, one of her cyberstalkers was sentenced to 4 months in prison and 1,000 euros in damages.

In June 2020, journalist Taha Bouhafs called her an "Arab on duty" on Twitter. He was sentenced on 28 September 2021for the offence of public insult on the grounds of origin to a fine of € 1,500, in addition to damages. He appealed. On 27 October 2022, he was again convicted on appeal for racial insults; he announced that he would appeal to the Court of Cassation. In December 2023, the Court of Cassation confirmed Taha Bouhafs' conviction for racial insults.

== Bibliography ==
- Gardienne de la paix et de la révolte, éditions Stock, 2020
