= Milwaukee police strike =

The Milwaukee police strike was a 1981 police strike in Milwaukee, Wisconsin, United States.

== Background ==
Three police-involved deaths in Milwaukee in 1981 have been cited as causes for a general increase in racial tension in the city that year. In December, two Milwaukee Police officers – John Machjewski and Charles Mehlberg – were shot and killed by Robert Lee Collins, an African-American man, while investigating a reported robbery at Alfred's House of Bourbon, a tavern. Following the deaths, Alderman Roy Nabors publicly stated that the shooting might have been motivated by the suspect's fear of the police. Nabors later said his comments had been taken out of context.

== Event ==
At approximately 8:00 p.m. on December 23, 1981, officers of the 1700-man Milwaukee Police abandoned their posts, citing Nabors' comments as evidence of the disregard they claimed city officials showed for the police. Mayor Henry Maier declared a state of emergency and, in response to a demand from the president of the Milwaukee Professional Police Association that the Milwaukee Common Council hear a list of police grievances before officers would return to work, convened an extraordinary session of the council. Maier also issued a request to bars and taverns in the city to voluntarily agree to close early for the duration of the strike.

The first hours of the strike were met with confusion, with some police districts having a single police supervisor as the entire law enforcement presence. In one case, two officers on patrol didn't learn a strike had been called until an hour after it began. During the strike, law enforcement in Milwaukee was provided by a combination of police supervisors who had not joined the walk-out and 200 specially-assigned deputies of the Milwaukee County Sheriff's Office. Nonetheless, media reported that at least two police stations appeared to have shut-down with a hand-written sign on the locked doors of the district 7 station reading "we are not conducting any business at this time."

Police returned to work late on December 24, 1981 – approximately 16 hours after the strike began – after the Milwaukee Common Council agreed to publicly denounce Nabors, as well as to increase police funding.

As of 2009, Robert Collins was incarcerated at the Wisconsin Secure Program Facility.

== See also ==
- Murray-Hill riot
- 1971 NYPD Work Stoppage
- 2020 Atlanta Police Strike
