= Murray-Hill riot =

1969 riot in Montreal, Quebec

The Murray-Hill riot, also known as Montreal's night of terror, occurred during 16 hours of unrest in Montreal, Quebec when the city's police went on strike on 7 October 1969. Many stores were damaged and looted; 100 arrested. Sûreté du Québec Corporal Robert Dumas was killed during a violent confrontation between the Murray-Hill taxi company and angry Francophone taxi drivers and their supporters. The arrival of the Van-doos, a unit of the Canadian army, suppressed the rioting and re-established law and order after 16 hours without firm policing.

== Background ==
Montreal's police officers were motivated to strike because of difficult working conditions caused by disarming FLQ-planted bombs and patrolling frequent protests. Montreal police also wanted higher pay, commensurate with police earnings in Toronto. In addition, Montreal Mayor Jean Drapeau, who had been elected as a reformer who had promised to "clean up the city" by cracking down on corruption, turned out to be no different from his predecessors and left many people disillusioned. Drapeau's focus on grandiose projects such as Expo 67, instead of trying to improve the daily lives of Montrealers, had also added to the frustration. The journalist Nick Auf der Maur wrote that by 1969, the working class of Montreal had a feeling that Drapeau cared only about building the gleaming modernistic skyscrapers that dominated the city's skyline and was indifferent to its concerns and needs.

The police wanted an annual salary for a constable to go from $7,300 to $9,200 and charged that policing in Montreal was more dangerous than in Toronto, with two officers being killed in the line of duty in 1968, and that the frequent rioting between French-Canadians and English-Canadians in Montreal in 1968 and 1969 added to the danger. Between February 1968 and April 1969, there were 41 gangland murders in Montreal, which was more than in the previous 15 years combined, as a younger generation of French-Canadian criminals sought to challenge the power of the Mafia, which had traditionally dominated the Montreal underworld.

=== Civil unrest leading to the police strike ===
To many, a monopoly held by the Murray-Hill taxi company was symptomatic of Drapeau's rule, in which those with power and influence, but not others, such as working-class taxi drivers, obtained favours from the city. The Murray-Hill company's owners were English-Canadians, but most taxi drivers were French-Canadians. This added to the tension. Taxi drivers formed the Mouvement de Libération du Taxi (MLT) in September 1968 to show their rage at the lucrative airport taxi route being monopolised by the Murray-Hill company at their expense. The Mouvement de Libération du Taxi was loosely linked to the FLQ, which argued that the French-Canadian working class of Montreal was being exploited by English-Canadian capitalists, and that this justified a violent revolution to make Quebec into an independent socialist nation.

Overall, there were 75 murders in Montreal in 1968, which gave the city the reputation as the "murder capital of Canada."

Rioting on Saint-Jean-Baptiste Day on 24 June 1968 was triggered by Canadian Prime Minister Pierre Trudeau's, their bête noire, visit to the city angering Quebec separatists. Then came demonstrations by cégep students demanding more placements in the universities.

Taxi drivers protested the monopoly of the Murray-Hill company's taxis and buses at the Dorval Airport. On 30 October 1968, roughly 1,000 protesters were led or inspired by the MLT, blockaded Dorval Airport with 250 taxis, and burned Murray-Hill company vehicles when they were presented with the opportunity. As a show of support for the taxi drivers, the FLQ had planted a bomb in a Murray-Hill bus, which was defused by the police before it could go off, and had blown up the home of one of the owners of the Murray-Hill company in Westmount.

In the first six months of 1969, there were 93 bank robberies in Montreal, compared to 48 bank robberies in the first six months of 1968.

In January and February 1969, the FLQ staged 10 terrorist bombings in Montreal. Between August 1968 and February 1969, there were 75 bombings linked to the FLQ. In February 1969, the FLQ set off bombs at the Montreal Stock Market (injuring 28 people) and at the offices of the Queen's Printer in Montreal.

March 1969 saw the outbreak of violent demonstrations by French-Canadians demanding that McGill University, a traditional bastion of Montreal's English-speaking elite, be transformed into a French-language university. That led to counter-demonstrations by English-Canadians to keep McGill an English-language university. The leader of the protests, a part-time Marxist political science lecturer from Ontario named Stanley Gray, ironically could barely speak French but declared that McGill must become a French-language university to end "Anglo-elitism" and rallied support from the Quebec separatist movement. Over two weeks of clashes and protests, McGill was reduced to chaos as Quebec separatists stormed into the meetings of the McGill's Senate and administration chanting such slogans as "Révolution! Vive le Québec socialiste! Vive le Québec libre!". The climax of the Opération McGill français protests occurred on the evening of 28 March 1969, when a 9,000-strong group of Quebec separatists, led by Gray, tried to storm McGill and clashed with the police officers, who had been asked by McGill to keep Gray's group off the campus.

In September 1969, rioting broke out in the suburb of Saint-Léonard between Italian-Canadians and French-Canadians over the language issue. Italian immigrant parents had kept their children from school to protest the fact that the language of school instruction was now French, instead of English, and on 10 September 1969, a group of 1,500 French-Canadian nationalists attempted to march through the suburb's Little Italy district to protest the school boycott. Upon their arrival, the marchers were attacked by the Italians, leading to a night of violence on the streets.

In the first week of October 1969, the arbitration committee appointed by the city ruled that the policemen's pay would increase by $1,180, much less than the $2000 increase the police had asked for. This led to the police going on an illegal wildcat strike. Because of the financial investment in Expo 67 and the simultaneous bidding to host the 1976 Summer Olympics, the city of Montreal was already heavily in debt, which left little money for pay increases for the police.

== Riot ==
On the morning of 7 October 1969, all 17 police stations across Montreal were deserted as the policemen gathered at the Paul Sauvé Arena for what was called a "day of study." The firefighters also joined in the wildcat strike. The provincial government posted 400 officers from the Sûreté du Québec to Montreal in the morning, and Quebec Premier Jean-Jacques Bertrand called an emergency session of the National Assembly to pass a back-to-work law. By the end of the day, the government had sent another 400 Sûreté du Québec officers to Montreal to impose order. But their efforts were feeble under the circumstances and Montreal suffered one of the worst outbreaks of lawlessness in its history.

While the police were on strike, a crowd of disgruntled taxi drivers belonging to the MLT appeared outside of the City Hall at about 6 p.m. in support of the police strike. The crowd carried banners denouncing Drapeau as being corrupt. After the rally, the taxi drivers formed a convoy, which was escorted by the Popeyes Motorcycle Club, the most violent of Montreal's many outlaw biker clubs. Joining the convoy were journalists and members of the FLQ carrying banners demanding independence for Quebec. On the street, the convoy encountered a Murray-Hill limousine, which was forced to stop. The passengers and the driver were allowed to leave, and the car was then smashed to pieces by the taxi drivers and the Popeyes.

The taxi drivers, the Popeyes, and the FLQ congregated around the Murray-Hill garage in Griffintown to protest Murray-Hill's monopoly at the Dorval Airport. Attempts by the Sûreté du Québec to stop the procession towards the garage were stopped by striking Montreal policemen. Many of the taxi drivers were armed with Molotov cocktails and were intent upon burning down the Murray-Hill company's garage. At the Murray-Hill headquarters, young people began to throw rocks and bricks through the windows and then threw Molotov cocktails. A sniper opened fire, which led one demonstrator to return fire. The Murray-Hill security guards were armed with 12-gauge shotguns and left several people seriously injured. One young man drove a Murray-Hill cab into a row of five limousines and three buses. The eight officers from the Sûreté du Québec were surrounded by the taxi drivers and, as a journalist from La Presse wrote, "were shouted down, roughed up, had their caps thrown into the air, and their badges ripped off." Sûreté Corporal Robert Dumas was killed by shots fired from the roof by security guards and the owner's son. Buses were overturned and burned. As the situation at the Murray-Hill garage escalated, the bulk of the Sûreté du Québec officers in the city were ordered to go there, which left the rest of the city relatively defenceless.

Because the police were mostly at the Murray-Hill offices, the rest of the city was relatively defencelesss. Mobs smashed windows and looted stores. The mob targeted a high-end restaurant owned by Drapeau, Le Vaisseau d'Or. It was thoroughly trashed and looted. Mobs also targeted pick-up points owned by the Murray-Hill company, the McGill University, and the Montreal offices of IBM. Gangs of masked men, armed with guns, systematically robbed banks, but most banks only had a minimal amount of cash on hand and bankers' losses were limited. One branch of the Banque d'Épargne that failed to do so lost $28,845 to three masked men who smashed their way in.

The Montreal Gazette reported on 8 October 1969:

"Fires, explosions, assaults and a full-pitched gun-battle kept Montrealers huddled indoors as the reign of terror brought the city to the edge of chaos and resulted in the call for the Army help..... Hundreds of looters swept through downtown Montreal last night as the city suffered one of the worst outbreaks of lawlessness in its history. Hotels, banks, stores and restaurants around the Ste-Catherine-Peel Street axis had their windows smashed by rock-tossing youths. Thousands of spectators looked on as looters casually picked goods out of store-front windows."

Many of the young French-Canadians who looted the stores claimed to be striking against the economic domination of Montreal's English-Canadian minority and chanted separatist slogans. Despite that claim, the looters did not distinguish between stores owned by French-Canadians and those of English-Canadians.

By the end of the day, over $500,000 in goods had been looted from stores, and 100 people were arrested.

== Government response ==
As the riot was ongoing, the National Assembly of Quebec passed an emergency law forcing the police back to work. Under the "Aid to Civil Power" provision of the British North America Act, Quebec Premier Jean-Jacques Bertrand requested for the federal government to deploy the Canadian Army to Montreal. Soldiers were rushed from Valcartier to Montreal to patrol the streets to impose order. The troops sent to Montreal were from the Royal 22nd Regiment, better known as the "Van Doos" (from the French word for 22), Canada's most famous French-Canadian regiment and one of the most decorated in the army overall. The deployment of the army shortly after midnight ended the chaos and violence and returned order to the city, to the relief of most residents.

== Aftermath ==
When order was restored, 108 people had been arrested. The inability of the City of Montreal to manage its police force was a driving factor behind the creation of the Montreal Urban Community in 1970. As Montreal could not afford a pay increase for the police, the provincial government resolved the issue by creating a new police force for the entire Island of Montreal, the SPCUM, which ensured that the wealthy suburbs of Montreal would participate to the costs of policing the city. The SPCUM became the SPVM in 2002, following the 2000 municipal mergers. Murray-Hill also lost its monopoly at Dorval Airport.

The incident radicalized Marc Carbonneau and Jacques Lanctôt, who then took part in the October Crisis.

== See also ==
- List of incidents of civil unrest in Canada
- Milwaukee police strike
- 1971 NYPD work stoppage

== Sources ==
- Auf der Maur, Nick (1972). Quebec: A Chronicle: 1968–1972. Toronto: James Lorimer.
- Lightbody, James (2005). City Politics, Canada. Toronto: University of Toronto Press.
- Jenish, D'Arcy (2018). The Making of the October Crisis. Toronto: Doubleday Canada.
- Morton, Desmond (1999). A Military History of Canada. Toronto: McClelland & Stewart.
- Palmer, Bryan (2009). Canada's 1960s: The Ironies of Identity in a Rebellious Era. Toronto: University of Toronto Press.
- Petersen, Virgil (1970). "Crime". Encyclopedia Britannia Yearbook 1970. University of Chicago Press. pp. 241–245.
- Sancton, Andrew (1985). Governing the Island of Montreal: Language Differences and Metropolitan Politics. Berkeley: University of California Press.
