= Blue flu =

Strike action undertaken by police officers

A blue flu is a type of strike action undertaken by police officers in which a large number simultaneously use sick leave. A blue flu is a preferred strike action by police in some parts of the United States where police strikes are prohibited by law. At times, the matter goes to court, such as when officers need to undergo medical examination to prove genuine illness. A 2019 opinion piece in The New York Times contrasted blue flu with a strike, calling it "a quiet form of protest, with no stated principles or claim for public attention or sympathy." Unlike most strikes, blue flu tends to be focused and of short duration.

== History ==
The term itself has been used where unions could be heavily penalized. Alternatives include "slowdown" and "virtual work stoppage."

In the United States blue flu work stoppages have been used many times:

- In 1919, one of the first strikes by police officers in the US (which was legal at the time) was stopped by then-governor Calvin Coolidge using the state's militia.
- During the 1960s, '70s and '80s, the blue flu was a ubiquitous and highly effective tactic in Baltimore, Memphis, San Francisco, Cleveland, New Orleans, Chicago, Newark, New York and many other cities.
- In 1971, between January 14 and January 19, around 20,000 New York City police officers refused to report for regular duty partly in response to dismissal of a lawsuit that would have increased pay for both police and firefighters, and entitle them to back pay up to the point of their last negotiated contract.
- In 1981, from December 23 to December 24, officers of the 1700-person Milwaukee Police Department conducted a work stoppage, citing disregard they claimed city officials showed for the police.
- In 2020, from June 17 to 20, an undisclosed number of officers of the Atlanta Police Department staged a sick-out to protest the criminal charges brought against the officers involved in the killing of Rayshard Brooks.
- In the Republic of Ireland on 1 May 1998, 5,000 Gardaí (police) reported sick; public order was maintained by putting the Irish Army on standby and removing Gardaí from training and administrative work. It is illegal in Ireland for police to strike or form unions.

== Reasons ==
Some of the common reasons for these actions are:

- Disciplinary actions that they feel are unjust, such as in 2011, when NYC reduced numerous police officers' vacation days by ten when tickets they had issued were tossed as being incomplete. The police blamed the situation on having to fill out a form while amidst confronting the person being ticketed. Technology has solved much of this by having scanners reduce the amount of information that had to be recorded manually.
- Deadlocked contract talks, or frustration due to extended periods of working without a contract. These are sometimes made worse when mixed with ongoing budget cutbacks.
- Work conditions perceived as unsafe.

Sometimes the proclaimed reason masks something else, such as when enforcing an unpopular decision is claimed to be a contract violation.

In the view of police abolitionist Josie Duffy Rice, blue flu can be the result of calls for police accountability or a perceived public critique of policing or police culture of any kind, in an attempt to blackmail the public into abandoning attempts at police reform and/or removing public officials who advocate accountability.

== In popular culture ==
In Mr. Monk and the Blue Flu, a novel based on the TV series Monk, the main character Adrian Monk is given a chance to return to his city's police force during a labor dispute. It's distasteful to him that "he'll be a 'scab'." A blue flu strike was also a background premise to "The Party's Over", a season 5 episode of CSI: NY, aired in 2009; as well as an eponymous episode of Brooklyn Nine-Nine in 2021.

The idea of blue flu was referenced in the Babylon 5 episode By Any Means Necessary in 1995, with respect to a labour strike.

In Barney Miller, a sitcom about NYPD detectives in a Greenwich Village precinct, the two-part episode "Strike" depicts a blue flu strike.

== See also ==
- Dereliction of duty
- Desertion
- Thin blue line
- Work-to-rule
- Blue wall of silence
