= Italian Patent and Trademark Office =

UIBM Logo

The Italian Patent and Trademark Office (in Italian, Ufficio Italiano Brevetti e Marchi, or UIBM) is an office of the Italian Ministry of Economic Development. Its mission is to control the issue of patents and the registration of trademarks in Italy. The UIBM is based in Rome.
