= Police strike =

Strike action by law enforcement officers

A police strike is a type of strike action when law enforcement officers are embroiled in a labour dispute. Sometimes military personnel are called in to keep order or discipline the strikers. Police strikes have the potential to cause civil unrest.

== List of police strikes ==
=== Europe ===
- Great Britain (1918, 1919)
- Paris general strike during Liberation (1944)
- Ljubljana (1993)
- Ireland (1998)
- Amsterdam (2007)
- Ljubljana (2010)

=== North America ===
- 1919 Winnipeg General Strike
- Boston Police Strike (1919)
- Detroit (1967)
- Youngstown, Ohio (1967)
- Cicero Police Department, Illinois (1969)
- Berwyn Police, Illinois (1969)
- Des Plaines Police, Illinois (1969)
- Harvey Police Illinois (1969)
- Waukegan, Illinois (1970)
- Lake County Sheriffs Police, Illinois (1970)
- Skokie Police, Illinois (1970)
- Wheeling Police, Illinois (1970)
- Skokie, Illinois (1975)
- Maywood Police Department
- Montreal, Quebec (1969)
- New York City (1971),
- Baltimore (1974)
- San Francisco (1975),
- Cleveland (1978)
- New Orleans (1979)
- Birmingham (1979)
- Toledo (1979)
- Santa Barbara (1980)
- Milwaukee, Wisconsin (1981)
- Corona, California (1983)

=== South America ===
- Bahia, Brazil (2001)
- Alagoas, Brazil (2001)
- Brazil (2004)
- 2010 Ecuador crisis. Police strike/coup partly in relation to planned benefit reductions. After a state of emergency and the near assassination of the president, the government steps away from planned cuts to police and military benefits. Police and military pay is then also increased.
- Bahia, Brazil (2012)
- 2013 police revolts in Argentina. Police strike over the value of their non inflation-indexed pay being eroded by rampant background inflation. After days of national chaos, individual regional police forces receive pay increases ranging between 33% and 45%.
- 2017 Military Police of Espírito Santo strike in Brazil
- Ceará State, Brazil (2020) Police strike
- 2020 Buenos Aires' State Police strike

=== Australia ===
- 1923 Victorian Police strike

=== Asia ===
- Shanghai (1940)
- New Delhi (1946)

=== Africa ===
- Egypt (1948)
- Nigeria (2002)

== Dynamics ==
=== Legality ===
==== United Kingdom ====
Police officers in the United Kingdom are currently banned from taking strike action under the Police Act 1996. Police officers have been banned from striking since the passage of the Police Act 1919. The Police Federation of England and Wales balloted members in 2013 for the right to strike but failed to gain enough signatures to petition the government to amend the legislation.

=== Causes ===
One cause for police strikes has been increases in the difficulty of policing itself. The wave of American police strikes in the late 1960s and 1970s accompanied other forms of social unrest—which themselves put pressure on police forces. Also, police wages, which had historically been exceptional, declined relative to the wages of other workers. Police strikes have also occurred in situations where national control was in question and the police's alignment differed from the current rulers (i.e. in occupied France and India).

== See also ==
- Blue flu
- Defund the police
- De-policing
- Mutiny
- RoboCop
