= Police Association Victoria =

Union organisation

- The Police Association Victoria
- The head office building in Melbourne city centre
- Founded: 1917
- Headquarters: Melbourne, Victoria
- Location: Australia
- Members: 18,000
- Key people: Wayne Gatt (Secretary)
- Affiliations: Police Federation of Australia
- Website: tpav.org.au

The Police Association Victoria (TPAV) is the trade union that represents approximately 18,000 members of the Victoria Police. The association is affiliated with the Police Federation of Australia, the trade union that represents over 60,000 police personnel across various Australian state, territory, and federal jurisdictions.

== History ==
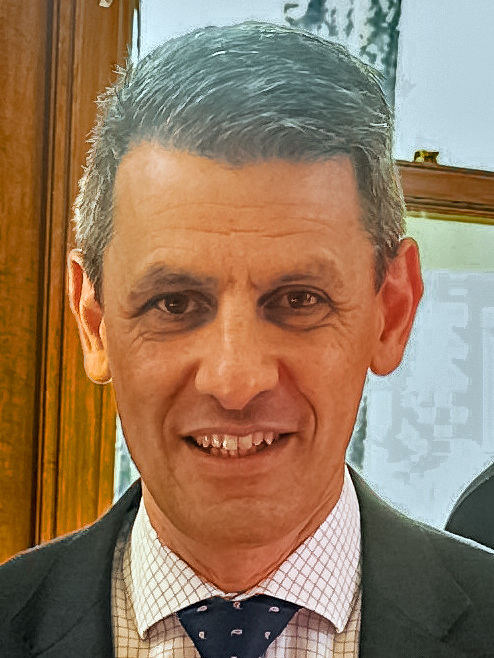
Wayne Gatt, the Secretary of the TPAV in 2025

In 1917, the Police Association was formed arising from low wages and poor working conditions being endured by Victorian police officers at the time. Police had a long-standing grievance regarding their pension scheme abandoned by the Victorian Government in 1902.

After the 1923 Victorian Police strike, which the association did not sanctioned, the Police Pensions Act 1923 recognised the organisation as the one employee body with which the government would deal on police welfare and efficiency matters. A substantial pay rise and improved working conditions resulted from the Act, however it also made it illegal for members of the force to join a 'political or industrial organisation', and it threatened a twelve-month prison sentence for any member who withheld his services or caused disaffection.

The secretary of the association between 2014 and 2016 was Ron Iddles.

== Enterprise Bargaining Agreement ==
On 15 February 2016, Victoria Police members voted for the 2016 – 2019 Enterprise Bargain Agreement (EBA). On 4 March 2016, the outcome of the vote was announced, and the new EBA took effect from 1 December 2015. Under the new EBA, Victoria Police officers received increased penalty rates for weekend work, added unsociable and intrusive to weekend work, increased pay for prosecutors, and a number of other benefits and entitlements. The new EBA did not include the ranks of Commanders and above. Victoria Police officers were offered 2.5% increase per year for four years, that started on 1 December 2015. At first, the new proposed agreement was strongly opposed by TPAV as the increase represented only 0.3% increase after inflation. However, in December 2015, TPAV changed their position and supported the new EBA.

== Police salaries and allowances ==
=== Police officers ===
The following table lists salaries for police officers in the Victoria Police since 2019:

Victoria Police salaries
Rank	Increment	1 July 2019	1 Jan 2020	1 July 2020	1 July 2021	1 July 2022	1 July 2023
Commander	1 - 4		$194,573 - $206,753	$197,492 - $209,855	$200,454 - $213,003	$204,464 - $217,263	$207,530 - $220,522
Superintendent	1–8	$160,203 – $191,698	$162,606 - $190,758	$165,045 - $193,619	$167,521 - $196,524	$170,871 - $200,454	$173,434 - $203,461
Inspector	1–6	$141,769 – $157,413	$143,896 - $159,774	$146,054 - $162,171	$148,245 - $164,603	$151,210 - $167,895	$153,478 - $170,414
Senior sergeant	1–6	$119,730 – $127,466	$121,526 - $129,378	$128,349 - $136,319	$130,274 - $138,363	$137,880 - $146,131	$139,948 - 148,323
Sergeant	1–6	$106,859 – $116,452	$108,462 - $118,199	$114,089 - $123,972	$115,800 - $125,831	$122,116 - $132,348	$123,948 - $134,333
Leading senior constable	13–16	$99,807 – $104,685	$101,304 - $106,255	$102,824 - $107,849	$104,366 - $109,467	$106,453 - $111,656	$108,050 - $113,331
Senior Constable	5–12	$85,279 – $98,818	$86,558 - 100,300	$87,857 - $101,805	$89,174 - $103,332	$90,958 - $105,398	$92,322 - $106,979
Constable	1–4	$69,836 – $77,735	$70,884 - $78,901	$71,947 - $80,085	$73,026 - $81,286	$74,487 - $82,912	$75,604 - $84,155
Recruit	1	$50,834	$51,597	$52,370	$53,156	$54,219	$55,032
Reservist	1	$71,604	$72,678	$73,768	$74,875	$76,372	$77,518

=== Protective service officers ===
The following table lists salaries for protective service officers in the Victoria Police since 2019:

Protective Service Officer (PSO) salaries
Rank	Increment	1 July 2019	1 Jan 2020	1 July 2020	1 July 2021	1 July 2022	1 July 2023
PSO Senior Sergeant	1–6	$94,889 – $95,902	$96,312 - $101,741	$97,757 - $103,267	$99,223 - $104,816	$101,208 - $106,912	$102,726 - $108,516
PSO Sergeant	1–6	$87,706 – $90,909	$89,022 - $94,473	$90,357 - $95,890	$91,712 - $97,328	$93,547 - $99,275	$94,950 - $100,764
PSO Senior	1–10	$73,881 – $78,954	$70,580 - $80,138	$71,639 - $81,340	$72,713 - $82,560	$74,168 - $84,212	$75,280 - $85,475
PSO 1st Class	3–4	$69,537 – $71,512	$68,423 - $69,794	$69,450 - $70,841	$70,491 - $71,904	$71,901 - $73,342	$72,980 - $74,442
PSO	1–2	$64,393 – $68,763	$65,359 - $67,083	$66,339 -$68,090	$67,334 - $69,111	$68,681 - $70,493	$69,711 - $71,551

=== Overtime allowances ===
The following table lists overtime allowances for Victoria Police personnel since 2019:

Commuted overtime allowance (COT 2)
Rank	1 Jan 2020 - 1 July 2023
Sergeant & senior sergeant	$14,662 - $16,790
Constable & senior constable	$11,596 - $12,369

=== One-person station allowances ===
The following table lists the one-person station allowances for Victoria Police personnel since 2019:

One-Person Station Allowance
Rank	1 Jan 2020 - 1 July 2023
Constable & senior constable	$11,596 - $12,369

=== Shift and weekend penalties ===
The following table lists shift and weekend penalties for Victoria Police personnel since 2019:

Shift and weekend penalties
Type	Hours	1 July 2017	1 Jan 2020 - 1 July 2023
Unsociable	6PM – 1 AM	$5.61	18.5% of ordinary rate
Intrusive	1AM – 7AM	$7.16	23.5% of ordinary rate
Weekend	7AM – 6PM	39.36% of ordinary rate	
Unsociable weekend	6PM – 1AM	45.22% of ordinary rate	
Intrusive weekend	1AM – 7AM	57.76% of ordinary rate	
