= 1971 NYPD work stoppage =

NYPD strike

The 1971 NYPD work stoppage occurred for five days between January 14 and January 19, 1971, when around 20,000 New York City police officers refused to report for regular duty. While officers maintained that they would continue to respond to serious crimes and emergencies, they refused to carry out routine patrolling duties, leading in some cases to as few as 200 officers being on the street in the city.

The police called in sick, a form of strike action known as blue flu, in this case circumventing Article 14 of the New York State Civil Service Law, a.k.a. the Taylor Law, which legally prevented police officers from striking. The stoppage was partly a response to a lawsuit by the Sergeants Benevolent Association being struck down in court. That suit would have increased pay for both police and fire fighters, and entitled them to back pay up to the point of their last negotiated contract. More specifically in the 19th Precinct, where the first set of day-shift officers struck at E. 67th Street, another triggering event was the subpoenas from the Knapp Commission investigating corrupt practices.

The strike was ended on January 19, after a "stormy union voting session" at the Hotel New Yorker. During the six days, the department managed to deploy about 15% of its regular force, using a mix of senior officers and auxiliary forces. In contrast to the Boston Police Strike of 1919, and the Montreal strike of 1969, there was no surge of crime or unrest. The back-pay issue was eventually settled in the favor of the officers and firemen with a ruling by State Supreme Court judge Irving H. Saypol. For violating the Taylor Law, later that year each participating officer was docked about $417 ($3,135 in 2023 dollars) each.

== See also ==
- Police strike
- 2020 Atlanta police sickout
