= Police Association of New South Wales =

Police union in Australia

- Founded: 1921
- Headquarters: Sydney, New South Wales
- Location: Australia
- Members: 15,625 (2012)
- Affiliations: Police Federation of Australia; Unions NSW; Australian Council of Trade Unions
- Website: pansw.org.au

The Police Association of New South Wales (PANSW) is the industrial association representing over 99 percent of the sworn Police officers in the State of New South Wales, Australia. Membership of the association is also open to former officers who have retired or been discharged from the police force as medically unfit.

== Organisation ==
The association was founded in 1921 after the founding of the NSW Police Force in 1862.

== Campaigns ==
In recent years, the association has focused on a number of campaigns, most relating to employment rights of serving officers.

=== Tasers ===
Since 2010, the association has campaigned for the roll-out of non-lethal electroshock weapons (specifically Tasers) to NSW Police officers. Tasers have been described by Association President, Scott Weber, as, "an important and effective tool in protecting people and controlling violent and dangerous situations".

In 2012, the NSW Ombudsman published a report suggesting Tasers had been misused by Police officers and suggested a number of new rules and guidelines for the use of the weapons. The association responded by saying the number of assaults against officers had "plummeted" since the introduction of Tasers.

=== Death and disability payments ===
In 2011, the NSW Government made reforms to the NSW Police Death and Disability scheme to "[remove] the giant lump sum payments and [encourage] more officers to return to work". The association organised a number of protests against the changes but eventually ceded to the governments demands. In early 2012, the Government negotiated further changes to the scheme to allow for payments of up to AUD$900,000 to a short list of unresolved cases that had not been finalised. These were the last Police Officers to receive lump sum payments as a result of being medically unfit for duty. The NSW Opposition (specifically former Premier Nathan Rees) claimed the outcome was a, "backdoor deal done with the association which undermines the whole arrangement".

As a result of these reforms medically unfit Officers are now discharged from service and receive five years of recurring payments at 75% of their salary. Once the five years elapses, if the officer is still unable to obtain alternate employment, they are required to apply to Centrelink for disability payments if they still wish to receive an income.
