= Organisation climate =

Concept in organisation theory

Organisational climate (sometimes known as corporate climate) is a concept that has academic meaning in the fields of organisational behaviour and I/O psychology as well as practical meaning in the business world There is continued scholarly debate about the exact definition of organisational climate for the purposes of scientific study. The definition developed by Lawrence R. James (1943–2014) and his colleagues makes a distinction between psychological and organisational climate.

"Psychological climate is defined as the individual employee’s perception of the psychological impact of the work environment on his or her own well-being (James & James, 1989). When employees in a particular work unit agree on their perceptions of the impact of their work environment, their shared perceptions can be aggregated to describe their organisational climate (Jones & James, 1979; Joyce & Slocum, 1984)."

Employees' collective appraisal of the organisational work environment takes into account many dimensions of the situation as well as the psychological impact of the environment. For instance, job-specific properties such as role clarity, workload and other aspects unique to a person's specific job have a psychological impact that can be agreed upon by members of the organisation. Work group or team cooperation and effectiveness as well as leadership and organisational support are other dimensions of shared experience that factor into organisational climate. Surveys are the most common way of quantifying organisational climate. Aspects of climate that influence performance of specific sets of behaviours and outcomes can be measured, such as the climate for safety and the climate for innovation. Many instruments have been developed to assess numerous aspects of climate.

The shared perception approach emphasises the importance of shared perceptions as underpinning the notion of climate. Organisational climate has also been defined as "the shared perception of the way things are around here". There is great deal of overlap in the two approaches.

== Cognitive schema approach ==
Cognitive representations of social objects are referred to as schemas. These schemas are a mental structure that represents some aspect of the world. They are organised in memory in an associative network. In these associative networks, similar schemas are clustered together. When a particular schema is activated related schemas may be activated as well. Schema activation may also increase the accessibility of related schemas in the associative network. When a schema is more accessible this means it can more quickly be activated and used in a particular situation. When related schemas are activated, inferences beyond the information given in a particular social situation may influence thinking and social behaviour, regardless of whether those inferences are accurate or not. Lastly, when a schema is activated a person may or may not be aware of it.

Two processes that increase the accessibility of schemas are salience and priming. Salience is the degree to which a particular social object stands out relative to other social objects in a situation. The higher the salience of an object the more likely that schemas for that object will be made accessible. For example, if there is one female in a group of seven males, female gender schemas may be more accessible and influence the group's thinking and behaviour toward the female group member. Priming refers to any experiences immediately prior to a situation that caused a schema to be more accessible.

== Shared perception approach ==
Some researchers have pursued the shared perception model of organisational climate. Their model identifies the variables which moderate an organisation's ability to mobilise its workforce in order to achieve business goals and maximise performance.

One of the major users of this model are departments of the Queensland State Government Australia. These departments use this model of climate to survey staff in order to identify and measure those aspects of a workplace which impact on: stress, morale, quality of worklife, wellbeing, employee engagement, absenteeism/presenteeism, turnover and performance.

While an organisation and its leaders cannot remove every stressor in the daily life of its employees, organisational climate studies have identified a number of behaviours of leaders which have a significant impact on stress and morale. For instance, one Queensland state government employer, Queensland Transport, has found that increasing managers' awareness of these behaviours has improved quality of work life employees and the ability of QT's to deliver its organisational goals.

== Organisational climate versus organisational culture ==
Climate and culture are both important aspects of the overall context, environment or situation. Organisational culture tends to be shared by all or most members of some social group, is something that older members usually try to pass on to younger members, and shapes behaviour, structures, and perceptions of the world. Cultures are often studied and understood at a national level, such as the American or French culture.

Culture includes deeply held values, beliefs and assumptions, symbols, heroes, and rituals. Culture can be examined at an organisational level as well. The main distinction between organisational culture and national culture is that people can choose to join a place of work, but are usually born into a national culture. Organisational climate, on the other hand, is often defined as the recurring patterns of behaviour, attitudes and feelings that characterise life in the organisation, while an organisation culture tends to be deep and stable. Although culture and climate are related, climate often proves easier to assess and change. At an individual level of analysis the concept is called individual psychological climate. These individual perceptions are often aggregated or collected for analysis and understanding at the team or group level, or the divisional, functional, or overall organisational level.

== Climate surveys ==
Theories of cognitive and neuropsychology and emotional intelligence provide additional scientific rationale for why leaders should improve stress and morale in the workplace to achieve maximum performance. Climate surveys can provide concrete evidence of how this works in action.

Organisational climate surveying enables the impact of human resource (HR) strategies to be evaluated to create HR return on investment (HRROI) calculations. This data has been found to be highly effective in changing the perspective of people-based initiatives as being an "investment" rather than a "cost" and transforming HR into a "mission-critical strategic partner" from its perception of "personnel administration".

A number of studies by Dr Dennis Rose and colleagues between 2001 and 2004 have found a very strong link between organisational climate and employee reactions such as stress levels, absenteeism and commitment and participation.

A study has found that Hart, Griffin et al.'s (1996) organisational climate model accounts for at least 16% single-day sick leave and 10% separation rates in one organisation. Other studies support the links between organisational climate and many other factors such as employee retention, job satisfaction, well-being, and readiness for creativity, innovation and change. Hunter, Bedell and Mumford have reviewed numerous approaches to climate assessment for creativity. They found that those climate studies that were based on well-developed, standardised instruments produced far higher effect sizes than did studies that were based on locally developed measures.

== See also ==
- Adaptive performance
- Annual leave
- Autistic burnout
- Critique of work
- Decent work
- Effects of overtime
- Four-day workweek
- Group dynamics
- Happiness at work
- Job performance
- Job strain
- Karoshi
- Labor rights
- Occupational safety and health
- Occupational stress
- Organizational studies
- Organization development
- Overwork
- Paid time off
- Person-environment fit
- Personnel psychology
- Presenteeism
- Right to rest and leisure
- Six-hour day
- Stress (biological)
- Stress management
- Suicide crisis
- Tang ping
- Teacher burnout
- Workaholic
- Workload
- Work–life interface
