= Full-time job =

Type of employment or study

A full-time job is employment in which workers work a minimum number of hours defined as such by their employer.

== Overview ==
Fulltime employment often comes with benefits that are not typically offered to part-time, temporary, or flexible workers, such as annual leave, sick leave, and health insurance. Part-time jobs are mistakenly thought by some to not be careers. However, legislation exists to stop employers from discriminating against part-time workers so this should not be a factor when making decisions on career advancement. They generally pay more than part-time jobs per hour, and this is similarly discriminatory if the pay decision is based on part-time status as a primary factor. The Fair Labor Standards Act (FLSA) does not define full-time employment or part-time employment. This is a matter generally to be determined by the employer (US Department of Labor). The definition by the employer can vary and is generally published in a company's Employee Handbook. Companies commonly require from 32 to 40 hours per week to be defined as full-time and therefore eligible for benefits.

Full-time status varies between company and is often based on the shift the employee must work during each workweek. The "standard" work week consists of five eight-hour days, commonly served between 9:00 AM to 5:00 PM or 10:00 AM to 6:00 PM totaling 40 hours. While a four-day week generally consists of four ten-hour days, it may also consist of as little as nine hours for a total of a 36-hour workweek. Twelve-hour shifts are often three days per week, unless the company has the intention of paying out the employee overtime. Overtime is legally paid out anytime an employee works more than 40 hours per week. The legal minimum for overtime starts at Base Pay + One-Half. The increased payout is considered to compensate slightly for the increased fatigue which a person experiences on such long shifts. Shifts can also be very irregular, as in retail, but are still full-time if the required number of hours is reached. There are some situations where a person who needs full-time work is dropped to part-time, which is sometimes a form of constructive dismissal to avoid paying unemployment benefits to a laid-off worker.

== Definitions by country ==
Full-time workweeks:

- Australia: approximately 38 hours
- Belgium: 38 hours
- Brazil: 40–44 hours
- Chile: 45 hours
- Canada: 30 hours
- Denmark: 37 hours
- France: 35 hours (government-mandated)
- Germany: 35–40 hours
- Iceland: 40 hours
- India: 48 hours (as per the Factories Act 1948, a person cannot work for more than 48 hours in a week)
- Taiwan: 40 hours
- Israel: 43 hours
- Italy: 40 hours
- Netherlands: 35–40 hours
- Norway: 40 hours (often regulated to 37.5 excl. lunch break)
- Poland: 40 hours
- Russia: 40 hours
- Sweden: 40 hours (not formally defined)
- Turkey: 45 hours (not formally defined)
- United Kingdom: 35 hours (not formally defined), 37.5 hours, or 40 hours contracts are all commonplace.
- United States: 30 hours or more, according to the definitions in the Affordable Care Act. "The Fair Labor Standards Act (FLSA) does not define full-time employment or part-time employment. This is a matter generally to be determined by the employer." The FLSA does, however, define the eight-hour day and thus sets the maximum workweek at 40 hours, but provides that employees working beyond 40 hours a week receive additional overtime bonus salaries. However, in practice, only 42% of employees work 40-hour weeks. The average workweek for full-time employees is 47 hours. Increasingly, employers are offering compressed work schedules to employees. Some government and corporate employees now work a 9/80 work schedule (80 hours over 9 days during a two-week period)—commonly 9-hour days Monday to Thursday, 8 hours on one Friday, and off the following Friday.

A person working more than full-time is working overtime, and may be entitled to extra per-hour wages (but not salary).

== Academic usage ==
“Full-time” can also be used in reference to a student (usually in higher education) who takes a full load of course work each academic term. The distinction between a full-time and part-time student varies markedly from country to country. As an example, in the United States a student is commonly defined as being in full-time education when they undertake 12 or more credit hours. This translates to 12 "hours" (often of 50 minutes instead of 60 minutes each) in class per week. "Lab hours" often count for less, only as one-half or one-third of a credit hour.

International students must maintain full-time status for student visas. Adult students (typically up to age 22 or 23) may also fall under their parents' health insurance (and possibly car insurance and other services) if they are full-time, except for one term per year (usually summer). Students may also be eligible for elected office in student government or other student organizations only if they are full-time. The Department of Labor has a full-time student program which allows employers to pay no less than 85% of the minimum wage to the student/employee.

== See also ==
- Eight-hour day
- Employment
- Full-time equivalent
- Wage labour
