= Flexible work arrangement =

Type of work arrangement

A flexible work arrangement (FWA) empowers an employee to choose what time they begin to work, where to work, and when they will stop work. The idea is to help manage work-life balance and benefits of FWA can include reduced employee stress and increased overall job satisfaction. On the contrary, some refrain from using their FWA as they fear the lack of visibility can negatively affect their career. Overall, this type of arrangement has a positive effect on incompatible work/family responsibilities, which can be seen as work affecting family responsibilities or family affecting work responsibilities. FWA is also helpful to those who have a medical condition or an intensive care-giving responsibility, where without FWA, part-time work would be the only option.

== History ==
The concept was first proposed in 1960 by Christel Kammerer, a German management consultant in West Germany. It was first implemented by the German aerospace firm Messarschmilt-Boklow-Blohm in 1967. It was not until the 1970s that FWA practices were first implemented in Canada, the United Kingdom, and the United States.

== Types of flexible work arrangements ==
- Flexible working hours
- Remote work
- Compressed workweek
- Compressed days
- Phased-in retirement
- Voluntary reduction of work hours
- Job sharing
- Time made up

== Beneficiaries ==
Employer:

- Increased employee productivity
- Increased morale/buy-in
- Decreased Absenteeism and presenteeism
- Increased turnover
- less employee payment

Employee:

- Creativity Work Mindset
- Improved Physical and Mental Energy
- Work/life balance
- Those with family obligations
  - Childcare or elder care
- People in intensive care giving roles
- Those where the only other option is to work part-time.

== Arguments against flexible work arrangements ==
- Key personnel may not be available when needed
- System abuse
- Decrease or damage to workplace communications

== Gender role theory and access to FWA ==
=== Gender role theory ===
According to gender role theory, society places different roles on women and men simply based on their biological sex (gender stereotyping). Given the competing forces working women face between their jobs and home, flexible working arrangements (FWA) are made very appealing. According to a journalist and Millennial workplace expert Tanya Korobka, FWAs also have the ability to encourage men to play a caregiving role as they have equal access to the programme. Wider access to flexible working could help reduce the gender pay gap by increasing opportunities for women in higher-paid roles. Pay inequality has been linked to the disproportionate number of women working part-time, and traditional workplace cultures that reward long hours rather than results. Changing employer attitudes towards measuring productivity by output rather than time spent at work have been cited as a potential shift in support of greater workplace equality.

=== Access considerations ===
FWA tend to favour those in full-time, salaried positions and male-dominated workplaces or industries. While in the male-dominated workplace, there seems to be equitable access, in female-dominated workplaces, both the women and men are less likely to have schedule control. It is argued this is due to female-dominated workplaces having low-paying roles and unfavourable working conditions.

=== Policy implications ===
-Based on the access considerations, it is argued that the group whom most needs FWA, may not be able to get access to it.

-FWA is important as it is attributed as a variable to help close the Gender pay gap and can assist in maintaining a women's labour market position after giving birth.

-Further research is being conducted by the European Commission (2017), which seeks to identify why an employer may reject a request for a FWA.

-Flexibility can be seen as a substitute to compensation.

== Current policy ==
=== Canada ===
- Budget Implementation Act, 2017, No. 2 (Bill C-63): Amendments made to the Canada Labour Code to give federal employees the right to ask for a FWA.
- No private sector legislation

=== United Kingdom ===
- On 30 June 2014, the statutory right to request flexible working in the UK was extended to all employees with at least 26 weeks’ continuous service. On 6 April 2024 the rules were updated to permit employees to apply from the first day of employment.
- In 2002 the right applied only to parents of young and disabled children. In 2007 it was extended to carers of adults.

=== United States ===
- In 2010, the government passed the Telework Enhancement Act for Federal employees.
- As of 2017, the following FWA bills have been proposed:
  - Workflex in the 21st Century Act: Allows employers to choose to offer employers a given number of paid days leave and FWAs. Employers who choose to do this would be rewarded via exemption from local and state bank days. This bill has some controversy as critics feel it would transfer more employee control over to the employer.
  - Working Families Flexibility Act of 2017 [H.R. 1180]: Enhancement to the Working Families Flexibility Act of 2015 [S.233] by adding a 'time off in lieu' amendment. Critics feel flexibility would be substitute compensation, which comes at the employees expense.
  - Schedules That Work Act and Flexibility for Working Families Act of 2017: These acts would give people the right to request FWA. This includes the right to alter schedule, hours, and work location.
- Overall, FWA are an employer/Employee (or union) agreement
  - Not spelled out in the Fair Labor Standards Act of 1938.
