= Infinite workday =

Pattern of working even in personal time

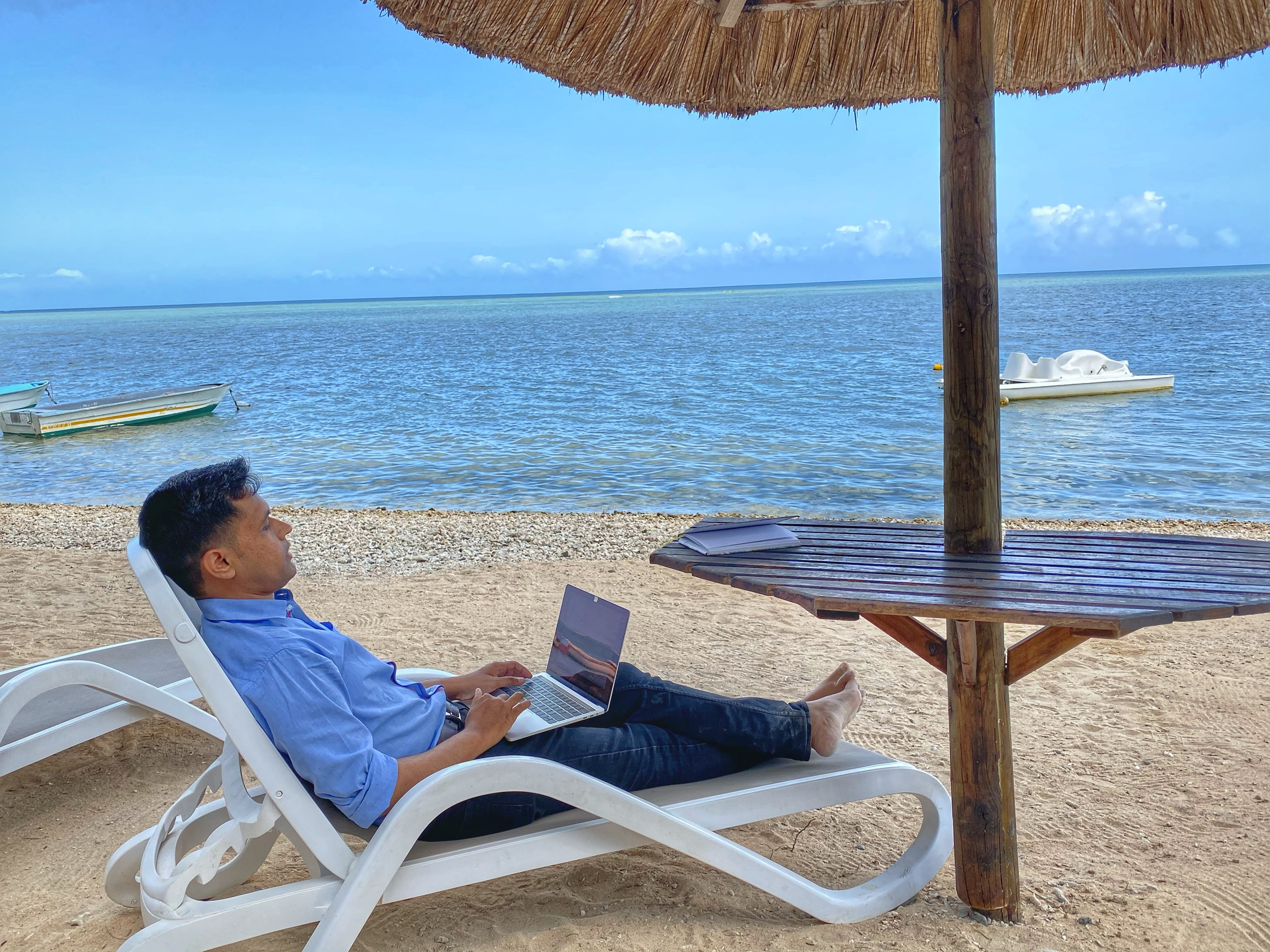
A person working on a laptop while at the beach

The infinite workday is a work pattern where working time encompasses hours beyond the traditional workweek and weekend.

The infinite workday blurs boundaries between personal and work time leading to a continuous cycle of work-related activities. This phenomenon is attributed to the rise of remote work, flexible work arrangements, improved tooling that enables employees to stay connected with web conferencing, and hustle culture. The infinite workday may negatively impact work-life balance.

== Types ==
=== Non-linear workday ===
A non-linear workday is a work pattern where working time encompasses multiple time blocks, rather than a straight block of time. Non-linear workdays may improve employee productivity if they coincide with staff energy levels. Non-linear workdays coincide with hybrid and remote-working patterns.

=== Microshifting ===
Microshifting is a work model where a day is broken into smaller, flexible blocks of time called "micro-shifts" allowing for a more dynamic schedule. Instead of a continuous eight-hour day, employees work in blocks throughout the day.

=== Triple peak day ===
The triple peak day refers to a work pattern with three peaks of productivity: before lunch, after lunch, and before bed. The third peak may add several hours of productivity per day. The triple peak day came to prominence following the COVID-19 pandemic.

== See also ==
- Eight-hour day movement
- Flextime
- Six-hour day
- 996 working hour system
