= Right to rest and leisure =

Economic, social and cultural right

The right to rest and leisure is the economic, social and cultural right to adequate time away from work and other societal responsibilities. It is linked to the right to work and historical movements for legal limitations on working hours. Today, the right to leisure and rest, including sleep and breaks, is recognised in the Universal Declaration of Human Rights, the International Covenant on Economic, Social and Cultural Rights, the Convention on the Rights of the Child, and in many regional texts such as the African Charter on the Rights and Welfare of the Child.

== History ==
The movement for a recognised right to rest, play, and have leisure time can be traced back to the 19th century and the eight-hour day movement. As early as 1856, stonemasons working at the University of Melbourne in Australia put down their tools until demands for reduced working hours were accepted. The ensuing guarantee of a maximum eight-hour workday is one of the earliest examples of legal protection against too much work, which today we recognise as the right to rest and leisure. The motto of the Australian Stonemasons in 1856 was as follows:

Eight hours to work, Eight hours to play, Eight hours to sleep, Eight bob a day. A fair day’s work, For a fair day’s pay.

Whilst Australia was one of the earliest countries to enjoy universal working hour limitations (an implied right to leisure), throughout the 20th century many other countries began to pass similar laws limiting the number of hours one can work.

== Definition ==
The modern notion of a right to rest and leisure is recognised in article 24 of the Universal Declaration of Human Rights which states:

Everyone has the right to rest and leisure, including reasonable limitation of working hours and periodic holidays with pay.

The International Covenant on Economic, Social and Cultural Rights recognises in part III, Article 7:

Rest, leisure and reasonable limitation of working hours and periodic holidays with pay, as well as remuneration for public holidays.

The Right to Leisure has also been recognised in article 31 of the Convention on the Rights of the Child, and article 12 of the African Charter on the Rights and Welfare of the Child, both recognising the:

Right of the child to rest and leisure, to engage in play and recreational activities appropriate to the age of the child and to participate freely in cultural life and the arts.

The Right to Leisure is considered an economic, social and cultural right, as opposed to a civil and political right. The right to rest and leisure is connected to the right to work, which is provided for by Article 23 of the Universal Declaration of Human Rights, and article 6.3 of the International Covenant on Economic, Social, and Cultural Rights. Where the right to work provides a right to work, the right to rest and leisure protects individuals from too much work.

The Committee on Economic, Cultural, and Social Rights has made no general comment on article 7 of the International Covenant on Economic, Social, and Cultural Rights. Therefore, there is no universal agreement on the specific obligations of states in relation to the right to rest and leisure, and "no common conception of these terms that may be formally assumed". Nonetheless, states do still have responsibilities in relation to the right to rest and leisure

== State obligations on the right to rest and leisure ==
Despite the ambiguous language of article 24 of the Universal Declaration of Human Rights, States do have obligations and responsibilities in relation to the right to leisure. The body of texts published by the Committee on Economic, Social, and Cultural Rights has established that in relation to all rights, including the right to rest and leisure, States have an obligation to respect, protect and fulfil.

=== Respect, protect and fulfil ===
The respect, protect and fulfil principle constitutes the core state obligation in relation to economic, cultural and social rights, including the right to leisure:

Governments and other duty bearers are under an obligation to respect, protect and fulfil human rights.

Based on the definition of respect, protect and fulfil principle outlined in the Committee on Economic, Social, and Cultural Rights' general comment No. 14, the obligation to respect requires States to refrain from interfering directly or indirectly with the enjoyment of the right to leisure. The obligation to protect requires States to take measures that prevent third parties from interfering with the right to leisure. Finally, the obligation to fulfil requires States to adopt appropriate legislative, administrative, budgetary, judicial, promotional and other measures towards the realisation and enjoyment of the right to leisure.

Therefore, states must not only respect and protect individuals from too much work, but must also fulfil the right, and ensure that individuals have the capacity to positively enjoy their right to leisure, and not simply be in the absence of too much work.

== Criticism ==
The right to rest and leisure, like many economic, social, and cultural rights (ESCR), has often been considered less important or fundamental than civil and political rights. Critiques of economic, social, and cultural rights such as Maurice Cranston and Aryeh Neier, or William Talbott's Which Rights Should be Universal, often argue that ESCR are unnecessary for human dignity, are less fundamental than civil and political rights, are too expensive and impractical, and that some constituencies of humans are undeserving of ESCR.

However, human rights scholars are increasingly embracing the concept of indivisibility and acknowledging that all human rights are fundamental. Defenders of the right to rest and leisure claim that it is of fundamental importance to well-being once basic security has been assured, and that leisure is "not an idle waste of time or mere absence from work, but, rather, necessary for a life of dignity".

The right to rest and leisure is an emerging human right, and debates around its importance and implementability are likely to be ongoing.

== See also ==
- Annual leave
- Critique of work
- Effects of overtime
- Four-day week
- Job strain
- Karoshi
- Labor rights
- Leisure
- Niksen
- Occupational burnout
- Occupational stress
- Overwork
- Paid time off
- Recreation
- Six-hour day
- Work–life balance
