= Overwork =

Excessive work

Overwork, also known as excessive work or work overload, is an occupational condition characterized by working excessively, frequently at the expense of the worker's physical and mental health. It includes working beyond one's capacity, leading to fatigue, stress, and potential health complications.

== Definitions ==
Compulsory, mandatory, or forced overtime is usually defined as hours worked in excess of forty hours per week "that the employer makes compulsory with the threat of job loss or the threat of other reprisals such as demotion or assignment to unattractive tasks or work shifts".

== Effects ==
=== Mental ===
Overwork, by its nature, is a stressor. The constant pressure to meet deadlines, handle heavy workloads, and maintain productivity can trigger a chronic stress response. This prolonged exposure to stress can lead the individual to a range of mental and physical health issues such as anxiety, sleep disorders, depression, and burnout.

Extended work hours can lead to decreased productivity due to fatigue, misdirected focus, and exhaustion.

=== Physical ===
In 2016, the World Health Organization (WHO) estimated that over 745,000 people died from stroke and heart disease as a result of working long hours. The WHO stated that overworking can pose a significant threat to cardiovascular health due to various physiological mechanisms. One of the primary reasons for this is the chronic stress that overworking can cause, which triggers the release of stress hormones like cortisol. These hormones can lead to elevated blood pressure and cholesterol levels, increasing the risk of heart disease and stroke.

== By country ==
=== Japan ===
In Japan, workers typically used less than half of their leave allowance in a year, according to a survey by the labour ministry which found that in 2013 employees took only nine of their 18.5 days average entitlement. A separate poll showed that one in every six workers took no paid holidays at all in 2013. In early discussions, employer groups proposed limiting the number of compulsory paid holidays to three days, while unions called for eight.

=== South Korea ===
According to Organisation for Economic Co-operation and Development (OECD) data, Koreans work 2,024 hours a year, ranking third in the world among OECD countries. This is 280 hours longer than the OECD average of 1,744 hours. Problems caused by overwork are growing in Korea.

=== United States ===
American legislation related to overwork includes the 1938 Fair Labor Standards Act (FLSA) which establishes a 40-hour max workweek.

== Government and policy makers ==
Organizations concerned with overwork include:

- International Labour Organization (ILO)

== See also ==
- All work and no play makes Jack a dull boy
- Causes of mental disorders
- Critique of work
- Crunch (video games)
- Four-day workweek
- Job strain
- Karoshi
- Labor rights
- Occupational burnout
- Occupational cardiovascular disease
- Occupational stress
- Paid time off
- Productivism
- Professional abuse
- Reduction of hours of work
- Repetitive strain injury
- Right to rest and leisure
- Six-hour day
- Suicide crisis
- Time poverty
- Uneconomic growth
- Workism
- Work-life balance
