= Effects of overtime =

Effects caused by overtime

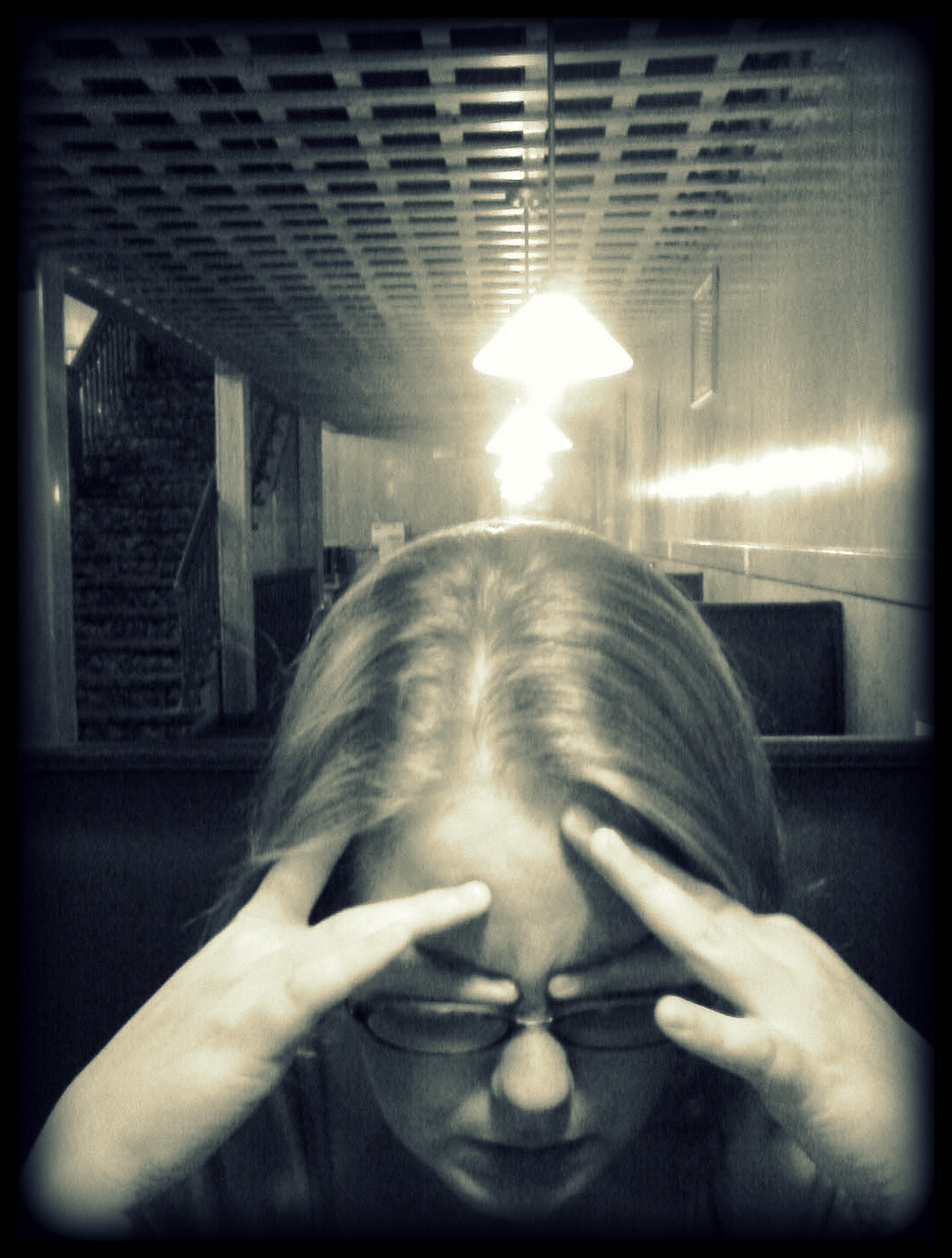
Woman experiencing stress

Employees who work overtime hours experience numerous mental, physical, and social effects. In a landmark study, the World Health Organization and the International Labour Organization estimated that over 745,000 people died from ischemic heart disease or stroke in 2016 as a result of having worked 55 hours or more per week. Significant effects include stress, lack of free time, poor work-life balance, and health risks. Employee performance levels could also be lowered. Long work hours could lead to tiredness, fatigue, and lack of attentiveness. As a result, suggestions have been proposed for risk mitigation.

== Health and safety ==
The health and safety effects of overtime work vary widely and much remains unknown. Some studies have reported numerous adverse health effects, including increased alcohol and tobacco usage, decreased birthweight in offspring, and decreased cognitive functioning found both subjectively and objectively using specialized testing. However, other studies have not established such relationships between overtime work and decreased health. Work shifts lasting 9–12 hours, work shifts exceeding 12 hours, and work weeks exceeding 40 hours have each demonstrated—in some studies—varying levels of decreased cognitive testing performance and increased workplace injury. Inconsistencies between studies may be secondary to numerous workplace and employee factors, which make it difficult for researchers to establish specific causal relationships. A larger amount of data exist regarding the male workforce, whereas additional studies are needed to better assess impacts of overtime work and extended shifts on women. A survey about events between 1987 and 2000 found that in a cohort of 10,793 men and women, overtime work was associated with a 61% excess rate of injury compared to jobs without overtime. Injury rate was directly proportional to length of the work shift and number of hours in the work week. Study authors found excess injury risk not only associated with jobs that are more hazardous, but also with overall fatigue from working overtime and extended work shifts.

== Mental effects ==
The mental effects on workers will vary based upon the work they do, the number of hours they work, and the individual working. Groupon performed a study in July 2016 on the effects of work. The results found that 38% work too much, 46% never had time to relax, and 60% of pollers have an unhealthy work-life balance. While this research showed some trends concerning the effects, other research has been performed to test the satisfaction levels of employees. A 2004 study of workers in Australia showed a trend that satisfaction levels decreased as the number of hours worked increased. They also stated that these effects could be lessened for those who enjoyed working extensive hours. These types of workers are more satisfied with their work-life balance.

In addition to working satisfaction, another Australian longitudinal cohort study revealed poorer mental health in workers with long working hours. The authors conducted a 12-year longitudinal follow-up cohort consisting of 18,420 people and 90,637 observations. With the Mental Component Summary (MCS) of the Short Form 36 (SF-36) measure, they noted a 48% increased probability regarding mental health decline in those workers working 49–59 hours per week, compared with those under standard working hours (that is, 35–40 hours per week). The probability increased by 53% in those working more than 60 hours a week. They also found a difference by gender; among those working 49–59 hours per week, the SF-36 scores are lower among female than male, indicating worse mental health among female workers. These impacts can also be seen with working longer daily hours: even in the case of a 4-10 work week, with 40 hours spread over 4 days, the longer days were shown to have higher fatigue for government employees impacted.

Similar gender differences were noted in other studies. In follow-up to the Whitehall study, a research team conducted a prospective cohort study following 2,960 middle-age full-time workers consisting of 2,248 men and 712 women. The results revealed a 267% increase in depression symptoms and a 284% increase in anxiety symptoms among those female workers working more than 55 hours per week, compared with those under standard working hours (35–40 hours per week). They also indicated a trend that for every 10-hour increase in weekly working hours, an associated 40% increase in depression symptoms and 31% increase in anxiety symptoms were noted. Similar trends were not noted among male workers. Similarly, Margot Shields surveyed 3,830 men and women between the ages of 25 and 54 who worked 35 hours or more per week between 1994 and 1997. She analyzed the relationship between working hours and depression. Her results found that women had increased likelihood of experiencing depression as more hours were worked.

Suicidal ideation is another concern for overtime work. Research conducted in South Korea recruited 67,471 samples, and the results revealed 30% higher suicidal ideation among workers having working hours more than 60 hours (31% increase in male workers and 33% increase in female workers). There was also increased suicidal ideation noted among workers working for 51–60 hours per week in both males and females.

In summary, mental effects related to overtime work include lower working satisfaction, depression, anxiety, and suicidal ideation. Among these, depression and anxiety are more predominant among female workers. Some research has proposed probable reasons for the gender difference. Female workers tend to take on more household responsibilities after work, which contributes to their mental stress. Also, female workers have been reported as relative minorities within the working place; at times experiencing lower job control, bullying, discrimination, etc.

== Physical effects ==
Consecutive periods of working straight shifts, lack of breaks during the day, and consecutive days of working without a day off lead to decreased efficiency and productivity in workers. A synopsis of the book "Tired Cops: The Importance of Managing Police Fatigue" by Bryan Vila analyzed how these affected police officers in 2000. The abnormal work and sleep schedules were leading causes of the limited efficiency of police officers. This downturn in their effectiveness created unsafe environments for the communities around them.

Long-term effects were researched by The University of Texas Health Science Center at Houston. They studied the link between overtime and the increased risk of cardiovascular disorder (CVD) events. Their results included evidence that showed that for people who worked at least 10 years for each additional hour worked, starting from the 46th hour, his or her risk of a CVD event increased by 1%. In addition to these health risks, María Beniell, who received her Ph.D. in Economics from the Center for Monetary and Financial Studies (CEMFI), researched the correlation between working long hours and the likelihood of individuals smoking, drinking, having a high body mass index (BMI), and being less physically active. The long-term effects of alcohol consumption include increased on-the-job injuries and loss of productivity, family problems, risk of high blood pressure, stroke, other cardiovascular diseases, and more. The effects of smoking, in addition to similarities of the effects of alcohol, include increased risk of heart attacks, emphysema, and a large amount of cancers.

Margot Shields' 1994–1997 study also analyzed the relationship between long hours and changes in weight, smoking, drinking, and exercising. For men, longer hours were associated with unhealthy weight gain. Increased smoking occurred for both men and women, and an increase in drinking existed for women. No relationship could be drawn regarding changes in physical activity.

In Osaka, Japan, researchers completed a 5-year study on the effects of long work hours on hypertension in 1999. At the end of their study, they had surveyed 941 male Japanese white-collar workers. They concluded that long work hours are negatively-associated with the risk for hypertension.

Authors of one paper performed a mental analysis on four published cohort studies and nineteen unpublished studies looking at the effect of "long working hours" (defined by the authors as 55 or more hours per week) to look for an association of developing Type II Diabetes compared to a referent group of workers only working 35–40 hours per week. They found that there was statistically significant evidence for an association between longer working hours and development of Type II Diabetes, but only for individuals of low socioeconomic status such as manual laborers, when compared to other SES groups. The lower SES group working longer hours had a 29% increased risk of developing Type II diabetes; even after adjusting for physical activity, smoking, alcohol use, and obesity. However another author commented that residual confounding might account for this higher risk in the lower SES group compared to the higher SES group. They also postulated that sleep may be a mediator for this association, since inadequate sleep or sleep of poor quality / quantity can be a predictor of Type II diabetes. The workers in the lower SES group may have less control over their schedule, and this may include disruptive schedules interfering with circadian rhythm.

One large-scale study using data from the Individual-Participant-Data Meta-analysis in Working Population Consortium involving 85,494 workers from several European countries also looked at the effects of long work hours and the association with developing atrial fibrillation. These participants were free of atrial fibrillation at baseline. Mean age was 43.4 years. During follow up over 10 years, those working long hours (55 hours or more per week) were at 40% higher risk of developing atrial fibrillation compared to those working a standard 35-40 hour-week. In their study, the investigators controlled for age, sex, SES, smoking, BMI, physical activity, and alcohol consumption. The investigators also commented that this association between long working hours and atrial fibrillation appeared to be independent of classic risk factors of atrial fibrillation due to the similarities of the exposed group (long work hours) and the referent group.

For Coronary Heart Disease (CHD), a meta-analysis of four prospective studies published in 2012 found a 1.4-fold increased risk of CHD associated with long working hours. The investigators also noted that this association was higher for men than women. They hypothesized underlying mechanisms for this association may include longer exposure to stress, sleep deprivation, and / or dysregulation of the HPA axis causing an increase in cortisol production. They also noted that this estimate might have been biased for several reasons. One reason could have been if workers with underlying CHD reduced their working hours in the years before a CHD event. A second reason could be due to confounding of SES. A meta-analysis adjusting for these factors found the risk of a CHD event to be 1.13 instead. Furthermore, the study authors also found a 1.3-times higher risk for those working long hours.

== Social effects ==
Work-life balance is a major aspect of employees' lives. Naturally, the more hours someone works, the less time they will have to spend with their family or other leisure activities. In 2007, professors from Penn State Abington analyzed the tradeoff between working overtime and home and family life activities. A major finding was that workers struggled to take time off for personal or family needs. However, the additional income from working long hours could limit the actual impact of this loss of time. More specifically, the impact of having a child exponentially increased the impact of working overtime. Especially at a young age, it is very important in child development for the parents to be involved to provide care and positive experiences. Due to this reason, work-life conflicts arise much more frequently for parents, as stress levels are heightened. These effects are even worse for single parents.

== Mortality risk ==
"Karoshi" (translated as worked to death) is a concern in Japan. A paper published in 2006 showed that over a quarter of Japan's workforce were working 50 hours or more per week with half of them working 60 hours or more per week. The Ministry of Health, Labor, and Welfare launched an investigation in 2002 to examine 300 cases of possible Karoshi (death from being over-worked) during a time frame between 2002 and 2005. From their study, they recommended that employers offer a physician interview / guidance for any employee working over 100 hours overtime / month or if an employee requested a doctor's assessment.

Overall research evidence has shown that long working hours increases mortality risk. A UK census-based longitudinal study of 414,949 people aged 20–64 years, showed that overtime work increases mortality risk in men working for more than 55 hours per week. The authors showed that mortality is higher in technical, semi-routine, or routine occupations (positions with high demand, low levels of control, or perceived imbalance between effort and reward). The authors also demonstrated that increased mortality risk was mainly attributed to cardiovascular disease.

Similar results were found in other studies. A 30-year longitudinal study in Denmark of 5,249 employed Caucasian men aged 40–59 years showed that men working 41–45 hours per week had a 59% increased risk of mortality due to ischemic heart disease compared to men working less than 40 hours per week. The authors also found that physical fitness played a significant role, where among men with low physical fitness, those working more than 45 hours per week had more than twice the risk of death by ischemic heart disease compared to men working less than 40 hours per week; while this increased risk was not seen among the fittest men. Furthermore, a study based on data from the Swedish twin registry showed that there was an association between overtime work of more than 5 hours a week and increased mortality in women. This association was also seen in men, but only in the first five years of follow-up. In contrast, the authors showed that working less than five hours a week of overtime decreases the risk of mortality in men.

== Counter arguments ==
Other studies argue that there is no direct cause-and-effect relationship between hours worked and short and long-term risks. Their claims include comments about factors that alter the outcome of effects. These include an individual's personality, occupation, and income. This research was done through a HILDA (Household, Income and Labour Dynamics in Australia) survey in 2001 and was completed in 2004. Prior research into these counter-arguments was completed by a group of researchers in 1997. They found links between increased CVD events and mental health disorders along with decreases in production as the number of hours worked increased. However, they state that further research is necessary before definitive conclusions can be made, as factors of each individual have vast consequences on the effect of working overtime. In addition, workers who work overtime when it is not mandatory find that there are very minimal effects on their fatigue levels.

In contrast, a Japanese study of 1,105 employees has demonstrated that longer working hours is associated with better health status in older employees. The authors of this study showed that overall health differed by age group, which reflects a generational difference with respect to their attitudes toward work. Among older workers, longer work hours might be beneficial as work-based social networks offer a structured environment, social support, and companionship.

== Risk mitigation ==
While a definitive conclusion could not be made, suggestions exist to minimize the potential risks of long working hours. Creation of the work schedule should be managed properly to avoid multiple consecutive shifts, long periods of working without rest, and balanced breaks during the day. For families with children, it is very important that employees can manage their schedule for family or personal needs. This will help alleviate stress, provide flexible work hours throughout the year, and avoid many work-life conflicts.

In 1981, Jay Kim and Anthony Campagna, researchers from Ohio State University, studied the effects Flextime. Flextime allows workers to change their start and end work time. They first analyzed a wide range of studies done on flextime. Then they separated 353 employees into two groups: one that allowed flextime, and one that did not (control group). Their study found that flextime largely reduced unpaid absences for employees. They also found a general increase in worker performance. Flextime could impact coordinating schedules and meetings, as employee work schedules may vary.

== See also ==
- Critique of work
- Eight-hour day
- Flextime
- Four-day workweek
- Job strain
- Occupational burnout
- Occupational stress
- Overtime
- Overwork
- Retroactive overtime
- Shift work
- Six-hour day
- Working time
- Work-life balance
