= Federal vacation law of Germany =

Federal vacation law (German: Mindesturlaubsgesetz für Arbeitnehmer or Bundesurlaubsgesetz) is the federal labour law on vacation in Germany which is established in 1963. The latest version is revised in 2013. The law establishes the minimum statutory entitlement to annual leave for employees in Germany, ensuring a baseline of rest and recreation.

== Explanation ==
It has 16 articles. Here is the explanation for some important ones.

=== 1 ===
Everyone has the right to have the annual leave.

=== 3 ===
The statutory minimum annual leave in Germany is 24 working days, excluding public holidays. In practice, however, many employees receive additional leave beyond this legal minimum due to their personal employment contract. According to the Federal Statistical Office of Germany, in 2021, the average number of leave days taken was 32.2 days. The number in 2023 was 31.0.

=== 8 ===
Employees should not engage in any paid activities while on leave.

=== 9 ===
If the employee is sick and this is proven by a doctor, the time will not be considered as annual leave.
