= Job stacking =

Method of maximizing income by employment of multiple jobs

Job stacking is the practice of maintaining multiple full-time jobs, made possible by the rise of remote work. Workers may point to rising living costs, a desire for greater job security, and free time during the workday as motivations for job stacking. The best examples for job stacking are part-time and freelance work, multiple roles in one organization and side hustles.
