= Fluctuating workweek overtime =

Fluctuating workweek overtime, sometimes also called Chinese overtime, is the practice of calculating overtime wages based on a salaried employee's average hourly wage.

== Overview ==
Using this system, employees are paid a weekly salary for a fixed number of hours, and any hours which exceed this are compensated for at a rate that is at least 50% of their average hourly earnings under salary. Under this method, the average hourly rate paid to employees decreases as the number of hours worked increases. Calculating wages based on this method often reduces administrative costs to the employer. It is primarily used by workplaces whose employees regularly work overtime, and where the number of hours worked varies greatly from week to week.

== In the United States ==
In the United States, employees must be paid a fixed salary regardless of the weekly hours worked, in order for fluctuating week overtime to apply. The United States Department of Labor revised the Fair Labor Standards Act to give employers more flexibility in using the fluctuating workweek method for calculating overtime.

In 2014, employees of PepsiCo filed a lawsuit against the company alleging that the company had denied them proper compensation by calculating their pay incorrectly based on the fluctuating workweek. The suit sought $3 million in back wages.
