= Niksen =

Dutch verb

Niksen is a Dutch verb which means "doing nothing", which can be roughly translated as "to nothing". It has been explored as a method to combat work-related health problems such as stress and burnout.

This concept is the focus of a book by Olga Mecking entitled Niksen: Embracing the Dutch Art of Doing Nothing, published in 2021. Mecking has gained prominence in the Netherlands as an authority on this subject, based on this book.

== See also ==
- Critique of work
- Downshifting (lifestyle)
- Productivism
- Right to rest and leisure
- Work–life balance
