= Wilhelm Haller =

Wilhelm "Willi" Haller (1935–2004) was a Swabian businessman and social entrepreneur and is considered the father and inventor of Flexitime of Interflex Datensysteme.

== Life ==
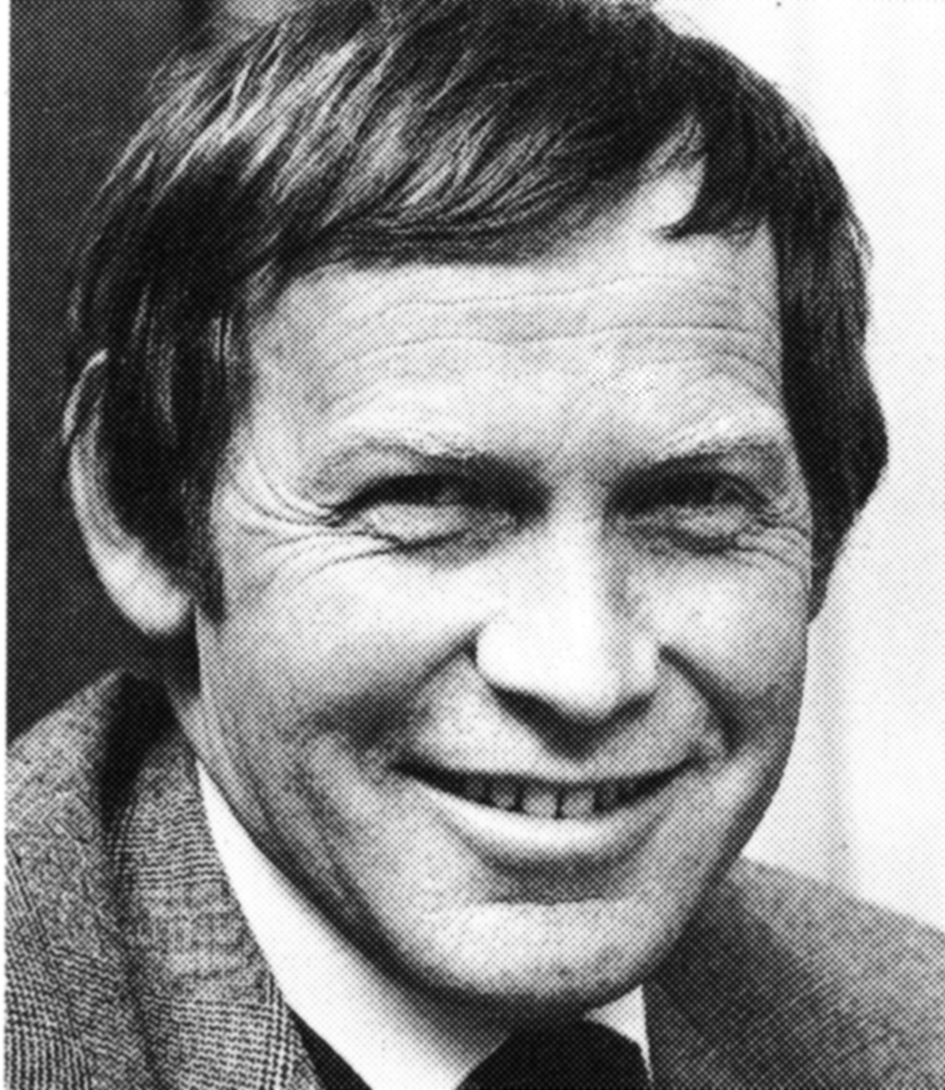
Portrait of Wilhelm Willi

As an apprentice with Messrs Hengstler, a German manufacturer of electromechanical counters, Haller became aware that the fixed concepts in organizations could not live up to the needs of the developments in the working world.

In 1964, he went with his family to New York where, together with Paul Buser, he founded the Hengstler subsidiary Hecon Corporation and, amongst other things, invented the key counter, which gained a US patent in 1966.

At the end of the 1960s, he returned to Germany and began to get involved with making working hours flexible and developed concepts for flexible working hours, variable working hours, and annual working hours.

Based on industrial counters, Haller developed the first time-recording equipment without which, realization of flexible working hours would not have been possible. This equipment made it possible, for the first time, to record the actual time that an employee worked and not just the beginning and end times of the working day. This was revolutionary in the 1960s. To reach a wide public with his flexible working hours concepts and to make them popular, Haller created the Swabian / English slogan 'I laik Gleitzeit' (I like Flexitime), which became the subject of discussion for many and was seen as bumper stickers on many cars.

His ideas and concepts caused him to be known as the "father of Flexitime" and led to discussion on making working hours flexible across the then West Germany, and with time more and more implementation. Haller advocated "three for two" job sharing to combat unemployment in the late 1970s. His advice was in demand as a Flexitime expert, not only in Germany but also worldwide.

In the course of this development, Haller started to design the first computer system worldwide from which a little later the first PC-based time recording equipment for SME's (small to medium-sized businesses) were developed. In their basic mode of operation, these systems met the standards of all time recording systems today. Many other products and patents can be attributed to Haller's inventions.

In order to achieve his goals faster and better and to give the employees a share in the success, Haller founded the company Interflex Datensysteme with three others of like mind which continually developed to become European market leader (it was later taken over by Ingersoll Rand). Haller built his organization on the basis of progressive management concepts. Employee motivation played a central role in this. The idea was that one third of profits should be shared each by investors, employees and charitable projects. A novelty for that time was the active involvement of employees in decision making processes.

Willi Haller left his company in the 1980s and worked as a consultant and coach in companies, trade unions, institutions and social organizations. He founded a number of social projects, including the "Lebens House“ and the "Nudel House“. He was guest speaker at universities and management seminars and appeared in television shows.

Although Haller was a radical thinker, he also had an influence on leading managers because he was not only charismatic but also pragmatic and logical in his argumentation. He is the author of a number of books and many articles about management, economy and theological themes. He saw himself as the student of the philosopher Martin Buber, whose influence is apparent in Haller's book Das Dunkle Feuer demonstrated in this translation of an extract:

We overlook, and too often suppress, the fact that salvation is actually to be discovered in the shadows. As in the conversion of seed to fruit, to use one of Jesus' examples, the darkness of the earth and its apparent destruction is decisive so salvation apparently grows mainly from a suffering experience within oneself and the environment. But this has nothing to do with the asceticism or self-affliction which makes us pull a face and adorn a bitter countenance but rather with a way to freedom; releasing man, creeping on all fours in internal and external dependency, to the glorious freedom of the Children of God and the making of us as upright human beings. This way leads to the wilderness, down into hell, into the caverns, into the dark lap of Mother Earth, where wheat corn dies and from which only thus fruit can be born.

Haller's ideas continue to be a source of influence even after his death, including in the work of the International Leadership and Business Society, which has set as its aim the humanising of work.

== Bibliography ==
- "Die heilsame Alternative", Wuppertal, Erstauflage 1989
- "Ohne Macht und Mandat", Wuppertal, 1992
- "Flexible Arbeitszeit", München, 1992
- "Flexible Arbeitszeiten im stationären Pflegedienst", Radolfzell, Erstauflage 1993
- "Das dunkle Feuer", Oberursel, 1994
- "Die Zinspeitsche", St. Georgen: Angela Hackbarth Verlag, o.J., 1994
