= Wage labour =

Relationship where a worker sells labour to an employer

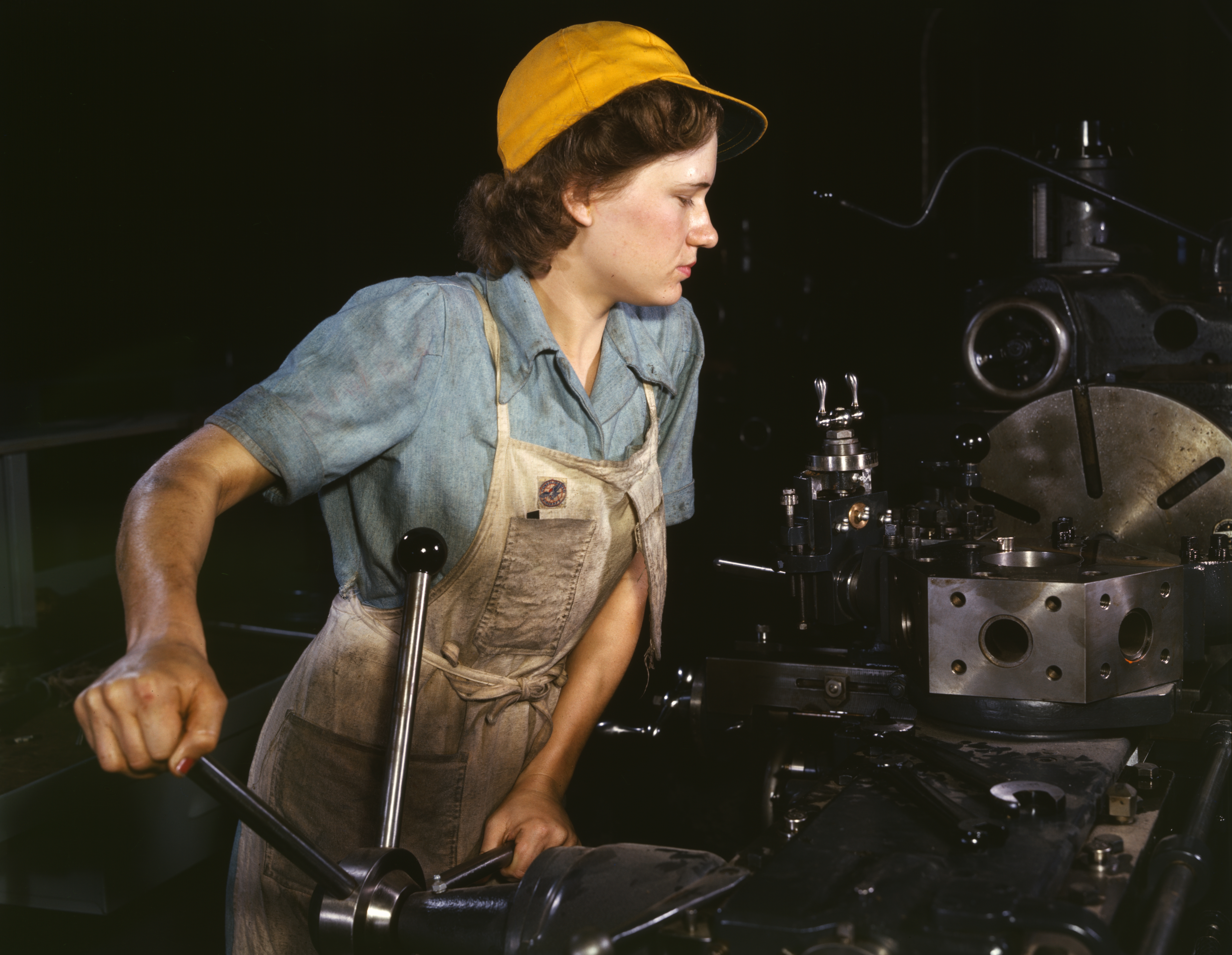
Turret lathe labour machining parts for transport planes.

Wage labour (also wage labor in American English), usually referred to as paid work, paid employment, or paid labour, refers to the socioeconomic relationship between a worker and an employer in which the worker works for a set amount of money under a formal or informal employment contract. These transactions usually occur in a labour market where wages or salaries are market-determined. Wage labor is a service in standard economic theory.

In exchange for the money paid as wages (usual for short-term work-contracts) or salaries (in permanent employment contracts), the work product generally becomes the undifferentiated property of the employer. A wage labourer is a person whose primary means of income is from the selling of their labour in this way.

== Characteristics ==
In modern mixed economies such as those of the OECD countries, it is the most common form of work arrangement. Although most labour is organised as per this structure, the wage work arrangements of CEOs, professional employees, and professional contract workers are sometimes conflated with class assignments, so that "wage labour" is considered to apply only to unskilled, semi-skilled or manual labour.

== Types ==
The most common form of wage labour currently is ordinary direct, or "full-time". This is employment in which a free worker sells their labour for an indeterminate time (from a few years to the entire career of the worker), in return for a money-wage or salary and a continuing relationship with the employer which it does not in general offer contractors or other irregular staff. However, wage labour takes many other forms, and explicit as opposed to implicit (i.e. conditioned by local labour and tax law) contracts are not uncommon. Economic history shows a great variety of ways, in which labour is traded and exchanged. The differences show up in the form of:

- Employment status – a worker could be employed full-time, part-time, or on a casual basis. They could be employed for example temporarily for a specific project only, or on a permanent basis. Part-time wage labour could combine with part-time self-employment. The worker could be employed also as an apprentice.
- Civil (legal) status – the worker could for example be a free citizen, an indentured labourer, the subject of forced labour (including some prison or army labour); a worker could be assigned by the political authorities to a task, they could be a semi-slave or a serf bound to the land who is hired out part of the time. So the labour might be performed on a more or less voluntary basis, or on a more or less involuntary basis, in which there are many gradations.
- Method of payment (remuneration or compensation) – The work done could be paid "in cash" (a money-wage) or "in kind" (through receiving goods and/or services), or in the form of "piece rates" where the wage is directly dependent on how much the worker produces. In some cases, the worker might be paid in the form of credit used to buy goods and services, or in the form of stock options or shares in an enterprise.
- Method of hiring – the worker might engage in a labour-contract on their own initiative, or they might hire out their labour as part of a group. But they may also hire out their labour via an intermediary (such as an employment agency) to a third party. In this case, they are paid by the intermediary, but work for a third party which pays the intermediary. In some cases, labour is subcontracted several times, with several intermediaries. Another possibility is that the worker is assigned or posted to a job by a political authority, or that an agency hires out a worker to an enterprise together with means of production.

== Criticisms ==
Wage labour has long been compared to slavery. As a result, the term "wage slavery" is often utilised as a pejorative term for wage labour. Similarly, advocates of slavery looked upon the "comparative evils of Slave Society and of Free Society, of slavery to human Masters and slavery to Capital," and proceeded to argue that wage slavery was actually worse than chattel slavery. Slavery apologists like George Fitzhugh contended that workers only accepted wage labour with the passage of time, as they became "familiarized and inattentive to the infected social atmosphere they continually inhale[d]".

The slave, together with his labour-power, was sold to his owner once for all.... The [wage] labourer, on the other hand, sells his very self, and that by fractions.... He [belongs] to the capitalist class; and it is for him ... to find a buyer in this capitalist class.

— Karl Marx

According to Noam Chomsky, analysis of the psychological implications of wage slavery goes back to the Enlightenment era. In his 1791 book On the Limits of State Action, classical liberal thinker Wilhelm von Humboldt explained how "whatever does not spring from a man's free choice, or is only the result of instruction and guidance, does not enter into his very nature; he does not perform it with truly human energies, but merely with mechanical exactness" and so when the labourer works under external control, "we may admire what he does, but we despise what he is." Both the Milgram and Stanford experiments have been found useful in the psychological study of wage-based workplace relations. Additionally, as per anthropologist David Graeber, the earliest wage labour contracts we know about were in fact contracts for the rental of chattel slaves (usually the owner would receive a share of the money, and the slave, another, with which to maintain their living expenses.) Such arrangements, according to Graeber, were quite common in New World slavery as well, whether in the United States or Brazil. Samuel Edward Konkin III, the original proponent of agorism, opposed wage-labour by disputing its necessity, psychology, and profit.

For Marxists, labour-as-commodity, which is how they regard wage labour, provides a fundamental point of attack against capitalism. "It can be persuasively argued," stated John O. Nelson, "that the conception of the worker's labour as a commodity confirms Marx's stigmatisation of the wage system of private capitalism as 'wage-slavery;' that is, as an instrument of the capitalist's for reducing the worker's condition to that of a slave, if not below it." That this objection is fundamental follows immediately from Marx's conclusion that wage labour is the very foundation of capitalism: "Without a class dependent on wages, the moment individuals confront each other as free persons, there can be no production of surplus value; without the production of surplus-value there can be no capitalist production, and hence no capital and no capitalist!" C. L. R. James argued in The Black Jacobins that most of the techniques of human organisation employed on factory workers during the industrial revolution were first developed on slave plantations.

== See also ==
- Capitalism
- Capitalist mode of production (Marxist theory)
- Child labour
- Critique of work
- Eight-hour day
- Four-day workweek
- Full employment
- Global labor arbitrage
- Immiseration thesis
- Labor rights
- Labour (economics)
- Labour theory of value
- Marxian critique of political economy
- Marx's theory of alienation
- Paid time off
- Rate of exploitation
- Reserve army of labour
- Surplus value
- Six-hour day
- Sweatshop
- Unfree labour
- Wage slavery
- Working class
- Working poor

== Bibliography ==
Articles

- Carsel, Wilfred (1940). "The Slaveholders' Indictment of Northern Wage Slavery". Journal of Southern History. 6 (4): 504–520. doi:10.2307/2192167. JSTOR 2192167.
- Hallgrimsdottir, Helga Kristin; Benoit, Cecilia (2007). "From Wage Slaves to Wage Workers: Cultural Opportunity Structures and the Evolution of the Wage Demands of the Knights of Labor and the American Federation of Labor, 1880–1900". Social Forces. 85 (3): 1393–1411. doi:10.1353/sof.2007.0037. JSTOR 4494978. S2CID 154551793.
- Hartmann, Heidi (1979). "The Unhappy Marriage of Marxism and Feminism: Towards a more Progressive Union". Capital & Class. 3 (4): 1–33. doi:10.1177/030981687900800102. S2CID 38196785.
- Nelson, John O. (1995). "That a Worker's Labour Cannot Be a Commodity". Philosophy. 70 (272): 157–165. doi:10.1017/s0031819100065359. JSTOR 3751199. S2CID 171054136.
- Roediger, David (2007b). "An Outmoded Approach to Labour and Slavery". Labour/Le Travail. 60: 245–250. JSTOR 25149808.
- Steinfeld, Robert (2009). Coercion/Consent in Labor (PDF). COMPAS Working Paper No. 66. Oxford: University of Oxford. Archived from the original (PDF) on 1 March 2014.

Books

- Deakin, Simon; Wilkinson, Frank (2005). The Law of the Labour Market: Industrialization, Employment, and Legal Evolution. Oxford: Oxford University Press. ISBN 978-0-19-815281-1.
- Fitzhugh, George (1857). Cannibals All! or, Slaves Without Masters. Richmond, VA: A. Morris. ISBN 9781429016438.
- Graeber, David (2004). Fragments of an Anarchist Anthropology. Prickly Paradigm Press. ISBN 978-0-9728196-4-0.
- Graeber, David (2007). Possibilities: Essays on Hierarchy, Rebellion and Desire. AK Press. ISBN 978-1-904859-66-6.
- Krahn, Harvey J., and Graham S. Lowe (1993). Work, Industry, and Canadian Society. Second ed. Scarborough, Ont.: Nelson Canada. xii, 430 p. ISBN 0-17-603540-0.
- Marx, Karl (1847). Wage Labour and Capital.
- Marx, Karl (1990) [1867]. Capital, Volume I. London: Penguin Classics. ISBN 978-0-140-44568-8.
- Roediger, David (2007a) [1991]. The Wages of Whiteness: Race and the Making of the American Working Class (revised and expanded ed.). London & New York: Verso. ISBN 978-1-844-67145-8.
