= All work and no play makes Jack a dull boy =

Proverb suggesting that lack of free time encourages lack of spirit

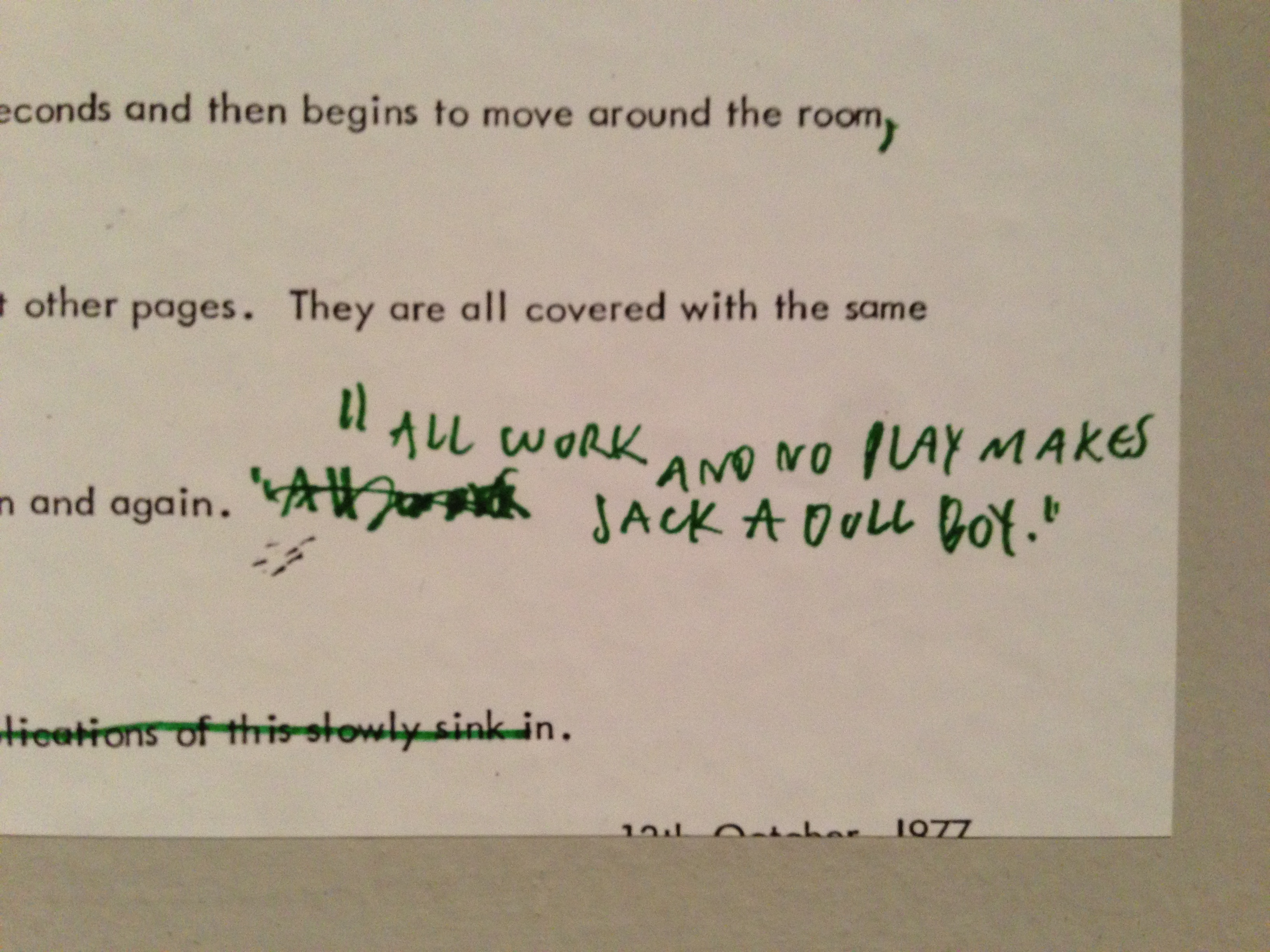
The phrase being shown in the script of The Shining

"All work and no play makes Jack a dull boy" is a 17th-century proverb that means without time off from work, a person becomes both bored and boring. It is often shortened to "all work and no play". It was newly popularized after the phrase was featured in the 1980 horror film, The Shining. The phrase is also pronounced in the 1957 film The Bridge on the River Kwai.

== History ==
Though the spirit of the proverb had been expressed previously, the modern saying first appeared in writing in Welsh writer and historian James Howell's Proverbs (1659). It has often been included in subsequent collections of proverbs and sayings.

Some writers have added a second part to the proverb, as in Harry and Lucy Concluded (1825) by the Irish novelist Maria Edgeworth:

All work and no play makes Jack a dull boy,
All play and no work makes Jack a mere toy.

== See also ==
- Occupational burnout
- Overwork
- Work–life balance
- 996 working hour system
- 007 working hour system
