= Christel Kammerer =

Management consultant

Christel Kammerer was a German management consultant who is credited with inventing the idea of Flextime, allowing workers to alter their respective start and finish times at work as long as they complete the required daily/weekly total number of hours. Flextime consists of a "core" period of the day during which employees are required to be at work, and a flexible period, within which all required hours must be worked.
