= Flextime =

Flexible hours schedule in workdays

Flextime, also spelled flex-time or flexitime (BE), is a flexible hours schedule that allows workers to alter their workday and adjust their start and finish times. In contrast to traditional work arrangements that require employees to work a standard 9 a.m. to 5 p.m. day, Flextime typically involves a "core" period of the day during which employees are required to be at work (e.g., between 11 a.m. and 3 p.m.), and a "bandwidth" period within which all required hours must be worked (e.g., between 5:30 a.m. and 7:30 p.m.). The working day outside of the core period is "flexible time", in which employees can choose when they work, subject to achieving total daily, weekly or monthly hours within the bandwidth period set by employers, and subject to the necessary work being done. The total working time required of employees on an approved Flextime schedule is much the same as those who work under traditional work schedule regimes.

A flextime policy allows staff to determine when they will work, while a flexplace policy allows staff to determine where they will work. Advantages include allowing employees to coordinate their work hours with public transport schedules, with the schedules of their children, and with daily traffic patterns to avoid high congestion times such as rush hour. Some claim that flexible working will change the nature of the way we work. The idea of flextime was invented by Christel Kammerer and Wilhelm Haller.

== From practitioners' viewpoint ==
The industrial perspective of flexible working emphasizes the practical definition of flexibility. Employees being allowed to work from many different places as long as their level of production is maintained, if not increased. Moreover, research reports gave quantitative interpretation backed by statistical evidence showing the changing attitude of organizations in different countries (especially the UK) toward flexible working. An estimate of 50% of the companies in the UK started to consider flexible working as a common practice and 73% of the managers in the survey showed an ultimate support to it. On the other hand, employees showed great preference to flexible working to the point that 40% of workers in the UK choose it over their salary. Also, greater focus was put to explain the increased demand for such arrangements by both stakeholders by which it was clarified by their advantages of contributing to the high quality of output results while creating the "perfect" working conditions for workers.

Additionally, as seen recently, most business organizations have started to introduce flexible working patterns for their employees as a way to increase their productivity level, increasing profitability. Flexible working is also seen as a family-friendly policy, which leads to a "good work–life balance" for employees. Some examples of organizations with flexible working arrangement include Agilent technologies, NetApp and Qualcomm Inc.

Flexible working arrangements is a way for organizations to expand and increase their operations nationally and internationally at lower cost compared to permanent or non-flexible working arrangements. While both employees and employers acknowledge the benefits of flexible working, drawbacks might include extra expenses and responsibilities the organization could incur in order to provide these arrangements and the decreased benefits offered to employees in accordance with their reduced working hours.

== Empirical evidence ==
Flexible working was academically introduced in 1970 and since then this topic continues to be the interest of many research papers.

For four decades, academic papers have contributed to the increased knowledge and interest in flexible working. A descriptive background of the evolution of the concept of flexibility as well as highlighting the main factors contributed to its growth were the main focus of academic studies. Also, they deliver evidence of the significant amount and the ongoing increase in the use of flexible working in many countries.

Studies examining access to flextime have shown that it is the high skilled/educated workers in higher occupational jobs, and supervisory roles that are most likely to have access. Unlike what many assume, women do not have better access to flextime arrangements, and female-dominated workplaces have worse access to flextime compared to workplaces where there are more men or an equal number of men and women. Many studies examine the outcomes of flexible working. For example, a study by Origo and Pagani based on a sample of European countries, gave a deep analysis of the concept of flexible working by testing the level of heterogeneity in the effect of flexibility on job satisfaction, the study found some positive link with some aspects of the job while negative or no relation was found against other aspects. There is increasing evidence for the "business case" of flexible working. A meta-analysis of studies has shown that flexible working can provide a wide range of benefits for companies, including increase in performance, productivity, and reduction in absenteeism.

Flexible working can both prevent and create opportunities. There is generally a positive relationship between flexible working and perceptions of job quality in term of work–life balance, and helping to improve and control autonomy particularly for remote workers, but some factors such as labor market efficiency and opportunities for advancement will be negatively affected due to the variations on different dimensions of job quality. Flexible working has also been linked to increased recruitment and retention of workers. Chung and van der Horst have shown that the use of flextime significantly reduces the likelihood of mothers decreasing their working hours after childbirth and reduces the likelihood of first-time mothers leaving their work altogether. Flexible employment is one of the vital factors in the European Union policy discourse. It is a means to reduce unemployment, increase economic and social cohesion, maintain economic competitiveness and enhance equal opportunities between women and men. However, flexible working has some problems. Studies have also shown that flexible working can lead to an increase in overtime hours.

== Advantages and criticisms ==
Flexible working is a pattern of working arrangements that enable employees to decide the time, duration, and location of their work. Flexible working patterns have gained the interest of both academics and industrial practitioners for some time, with implementation into law in certain countries as far back as 1930, but also in recent years. Existing literature highlights the fundamental importance of flexible working to both academics and organizations as a means of establishing a good work–life balance for employees. Work–life balance for employees is theorized to increase employee efficiency, which in turns leads to increase in productivity of the organization. This would also be suggested from research on the decreasing returns of working hours.

Academic literature has identified benefits of flexible working patterns to employees including life satisfaction, better wellbeing, a good work–life balance, and health benefits but some researchers argue that although there are such benefits, there are some negative effects such as work intensities, job insecurities associated with the flexible working arrangement. Research works such as Evans et al., (2000) also highlight that flexible working pattern may not be applicable to all occupational fields, the authors also highlighted medical professions (doctor, pharmacist, nurse, etc.) as one of such fields. A further critique is that some patterns of work deemed "flexible" such as a compressed work week may be put forward by the employer, rather than suiting the individual employee, and thus may not capture the same benefits as employee-chosen flexible working.

Industrial sources also have been able to highlight one of the positive effects of flexible working patterns as being able to attract highly qualified professionals, but Brookins established some negative effects flexible working patterns had to employers as it adds expenses and responsibility in the organization, negative availability perspectives of employees on the customers, and employee availability.

Both academics and industrial sources were established that in some professions flexible working arrangement may not be available or its availability will have a negative perspective on employees by others with a non-flexible arrangement, example of such profession is medical professions. A research done by Evans et al., (2000) on flexible working patterns on medical professions emphasized how some medical doctors may attribute negative perception with colleagues with flexible working patterns. In 1930, Employees in the United Kingdom were given the right to request for flexible working arrangements, but there were no instructions or guidelines on the way for this would work. Flexible working concepts are also a relatively new form of working arrangement and this has limited its application in other parts of the world such as a country in Africa.

== Recording working ==
There are many different methods used for recording working time ranging from sophisticated software (computer programs) to handwritten time sheets. Most of these methods are associated with the payment of wages in return for hours worked. As a result, they often do not address a fundamental difference of most flexible working systems – namely the intention of flexible working to allow an employee to "trade hours" with their employer in return for a fixed wage.

== By region ==
=== European Commission ===
In 2017, the European Commission proposed a directive on work–life balance which includes the extension of the right to request flexible working arrangements (reduced working hours, flexible working hours and flexibility in place of work) to all working parents of children up to 12 and careers with dependent relatives. It also includes non-legislative measures, ensuring protection against discrimination and dismissal for parents (including pregnant women and workers coming back from a leave) and careers, the directive also encourages a gender-balanced use of family-related leaves and flexible working arrangements. The proposal was approved as Directive (EU) 2019/1158.

=== United Kingdom ===
Haller founded a company in the UK in 1971 and registered the trademark "Flextime", the mark remains the property of the company's successor HFX Ltd. In the Spring of 2003, 17.7% of men and 26.7% of women were employed with flextime arrangements in the United Kingdom, (Note: Sourced by the UK Office for National Statistics 2003) In the United Kingdom, flextime working is commonplace in both the private and public sectors. The practice is often found in administrative and back-office functions of commercial organizations and local councils.

In 2003, the UK Government introduced legislation that gave parents of children under six, or the parents of disabled children under 18 the right in law to request a flexible working arrangement from their employer. A survey in 2005 by the National Office of Statistics showed that 71% of female workers and 60% of male workers were aware of the rights created under the 2003 legislation. Between 2003 and 2005 more than 14% of all workers had requested a change to flexible working. Since April 2007 the right to request flexible working also applies to carers of adults.

On November 13, 2012, Deputy Prime Minister Nick Clegg announced plans to extend the right to request flexible working to all employees, this legislation took effect in April 2014. The law firm Lewis Silkin has suggested that this could cause "major headaches" for employers.

=== United States ===
In certain industries and disciplines, such as information technology, flextime permits workers to vary their schedule. For example, they may opt to work four 10-hour days per week, taking Monday or Friday off. Another flextime schedule is to work nine-hour days Monday through Thursday, an eight-hour day on Friday, taking every other Friday off, called the "9/80 work schedule". Some agencies of the United States government allow employees to work such a schedule, and designate it as an alternative work schedule (AWS). Workers may arrange to coordinate their days off so that their responsibilities are adequately covered.

== See also ==
- Effects of overtime
- Equal employment opportunity
- Fair Labor Standards Act of 1938 (United States)
- Four-day workweek
- Infinite workday
- Labour economics
- Labour market flexibility
- Office for National Statistics (UK)
- Remote work
- Time clock
