= Alfred Edments =

Australian businessman (1853–1909)

Alfred Edments (17 October 1853 – 13 July 1909) was a merchant and philanthropist in Australia.

Edments was born in London, the son of James Edments, a labourer, and his wife Ann, née Lyons. He died at Melbourne on 13 July 1909 of heart disease; he left much of his money to charity via the Alfred Edments Trust. The rest of his fortune was left to his niece E Dench who had no children and left her fortune at her death to Ewen Middlemiss estimated at the time to be $20 million.
