= 35-hour workweek =

French labour law

The 35-hour workweek is a labour reform policy adopted in France in February 2000, under Prime Minister Lionel Jospin's Plural Left government. Promoted by Minister of Labour Martine Aubry, it was adopted in two phases: the Aubry 1 law in June 1998 and the Aubry 2 law in January 2000. The previous legal working week was 39 hours, established by President François Mitterrand, also a member of the Socialist Party. The 35-hour working week had been on the Socialist Party's 1981 electoral program, titled 110 Propositions for France, but was not pursued because of the poor state of the economy.

Time worked after the standard legal limit of 35 hours is considered overtime. The reform's aim is primarily to lower the unemployment rate, then at a record high of 12.5%, by encouraging the creation of jobs with work sharing.

== Objectives ==
The main stated objectives of the law were to create new jobs, by making it more cost effective to hire an additional worker than to pay current staff overtime, and the pursuit of decommodification of France's citizens, by lowering the amount of time dedicated to work without lowering their standard of living. Additionally, the Jospin government was able to advantage of the changes introduced with the 35-hour workweek to relax other workforce legislation.

== Implementation ==
The Aubry 1 law was passed in 1998. It served as an encouragement for businesses to transition voluntarily to a 35-hour workweek. It did so by offering a reduced payroll tax for all businesses that lowered their current employees' working hours and hired additional workers before January 2000.

The Aubry 2 law was adopted in January 2000. It legally lowered the standard hours worked per week from 39 to 35 for companies with more than 20 employees. Small businesses had until January 2002 to prepare for the shift. Additional hours worked after 35 then had to be paid at the overtime premium of 25% for the first eight hours, and then at a 50% premium for any further hours.

Businesses were required to sign an agreement with unions to bargain over the hourly wage increase, to make up for the potential loss of income by the employees' decreasing work time. Unions wanted to ensure that the reduced weekly hours would not result in a reduced income. Their slogan was "35 hours pays 39".

To motivate companies to compromise with unions, the government offered social security rebates to all firms that signed contracts with unions agreeing to a 35-hour workweek and wage increases. The legislation explicitly stated that monthly income must stay at the same level, however this only applied to minimum wage workers. To help small companies make the transition, the government increased the annual limit on overtime hours for small companies and set their overtime premiums at a lower rate.

== Amendments ==
The Raffarin government, some members of which were vocal critics of the law, gradually pushed for further relaxation of the legal working time requirements. On 22 December 2004, the French Parliament extended the maximum number of overtime hours per year from 180 to 220 under the Fallon laws. The reforms also reduced the payroll tax cuts given to companies that implemented the 35-hour workweek.

On 31 March 2005, another law extended the possibilities of overtime hours.

In August 2016, the El Khomri law reduced overtime payments.

== Results ==
Professor Fabrice Gilles at the University of Lille studied the impact of the Aubry laws, by analyzing data on capital operating time (the average time that capital equipment is in use at firms) from the Bank of France and administrative files on work time regulation agreements from the French Ministry of Labour. He found that capital operating time has not decreased in shift-work firms, because they responded by increasing the intensity of night-shift work and adding some additional overtime. In fact, shift-work companies have expanded scheduled hours to preserve output and increase productivity. Non-shift-work companies have decreased their capital operating costs.

There has not been a significant rise in dual jobholding as a result of the reduction of full-time employment work hours.

Even though the standard hours worked in a week has been lowered to 35, some occupations demand more. The French bar association (CNB) says that 44% of lawyers in the country worked 55 hours or more a week in 2008. Part-time workers work an average 23.3 hours a week in France, compared to the European average of 20.1 hours.

After being implemented, the Aubry reforms were credited with lowering unemployment and expanding the economy, although they have been met with legislative proposals for additional reforms.

== Criticism ==
Businesses have overhead costs such as training, rent and employment taxes that do not adjust with operating hours. The expenses and higher wages cause the cost benefit of hiring an extra worker to go down, and raise the incremental cost of each additional worker.

Generally speaking, left-wing parties and trade unions support the reduction, while right-wing parties and the MEDEF employer federation oppose it. Critics of the 35-hour working week have argued that it has failed to serve its purpose because an increase in recruitment has not occurred. In their view, the reluctance of firms to take on new workers has instead simply increased hourly production quotas. According to right-wing parties and economic commentators, the main reason that French firms avoid hiring new workers is that French employment regulations on labour flexibility make it difficult to lay off workers during poor economic periods.

== See also ==
- Six-hour day
- Fair Labor Standards Act (United States)
- New Employment Contract (France)
- First Employment Contract (France)

== Bibliography ==
- Loi n° 2005-296 du 31 mars 2005 portant réforme de l'organisation du temps de travail dans l'entreprise (in French)
- Workforce code
