= Overtime =

Working beyond normal working hours

Overtime is the amount of time someone works beyond normal working hours. The term is also used for the pay received for this time. Normal hours may be determined in several ways:

- by custom (what is considered healthy or reasonable by society),
- by practices of a given trade or profession,
- by legislation,
- by agreement between employers and workers or their representatives.

Most national countries have overtime labour laws designed to dissuade or prevent employers from forcing their employees to work excessively long hours (such as the situation in the textile mills in the 1920s). These laws may take into account other considerations than humanitarian concerns, such as preserving the health of workers so that they may continue to be productive, or increasing the overall level of employment in the economy. One common approach to regulating overtime is to require employers to pay workers at a higher hourly rate for overtime work. Companies may choose to pay workers higher overtime pay even if not obliged to do so by law, particularly if they believe that they face a backward bending supply curve of labour.

Overtime pay rates can cause workers to work longer hours than they would at a flat hourly rate. Overtime laws, attitudes toward overtime and hours of work vary greatly from country to country and between various sectors.

== Time off in lieu ==
Time off in lieu (TOIL), compensatory time, or comp time is a type of work schedule arrangement that allows (or requires) workers to take time off instead of, or in addition to, receiving overtime pay. A worker may receive overtime pay plus equal time off for each hour worked on certain agreed days, such as public holidays.

In the United States, such arrangements are currently legal in the public sector but not in the private sector.

For example, non-exempt workers must receive at least one and one half times their normal hourly wage for every hour worked beyond 40 hours in a work week. For example, workers who clock 48 hours in one week would receive the pay equivalent to 52 hours of work (40 hours + 8 hours at 1.5 times the normal hourly wage). With comp time, the worker could (or would have to) forgo the 12 hours of overtime pay and instead take 8 paid hours off at some future date.

In some other jurisdictions, such as Canada, employers might be required to pay the overtime at the higher rate (e.g. 1.5 times the normal rate), but also be allowed to require time off in lieu at the normal rate. Thus, an employee might work 48 hours in one week, and 32 hours the next week (assuming over 40 hours is overtime), and be paid an extra amount equivalent to 4 hours work (8 multiplied by 0.5).

In Australia, such arrangements both in the private and public sector are common.

In some cases, particularly when employees are represented by a labour union, overtime may be paid at a higher rate than 1.5 times the hourly pay. In some factories, for example, if workers are required to work on a Sunday, they may be paid twice their regular rate (i.e., "double time").

== Overtime laws by jurisdiction ==
=== European Union ===
Directives issued by the European Union must be incorporated into law by member states.

Directives 93/104/EC (1993), 2000/34/EC (2000), which limited working hours, were consolidated into 2003/88/EC (2003). Employers and employees can agree to opt out, under certain circumstances.

The directives require:

- maximum average working week (including overtime) of 48 hours over a 17-week reference period
- minimum daily rest period of 11 consecutive hours in every 24
- breaks when the working day exceeds 6 hours
- minimum weekly rest period of 24 hours plus the 11 hours daily rest period in every 7-day period
- minimum of 4 weeks paid annual leave
- night work restricted to an average of 8 hours in any 24-hour period

The directives apply to:

- all sectors of activity, both public and private
- Doctors in training used to work a maximum week of 58 hours until 2009. From 1 August 2009 their maximum working week fell to 48 hours.

Exemptions:

- Member States of the EC may exempt: managing executives or other persons with autonomous decision-making power; family workers; and workers officiating at religious ceremonies. These are workers whose working time is not measured or pre-determined or can be determined by the workers.
- Other categories can be exempted from the directive's key provisions provided compensatory rest or appropriate protection is granted. These include employees who work a long way from home, or whose activities require a permanent presence or continuity of service or production, or who work in sectors which have peaks of activity. Examples include off-shore workers, security guards, journalists, emergency workers, agricultural workers, tour guides, etc.

==== Greece ====
Overtime is defined as the employment that exceeds the time limits of the statutory weekly and daily working hours. Specifically, overtime is considered to be employment beyond 48 hours weekly and 8 hours daily (for employees under a six-day workweek system), and beyond 45 hours weekly and 9 hours daily (for employees under a five-day workweek system). Exceeding 9 hours of work per day is always taken into account as overtime (whether lawful or unlawful), because in this instance there is an exceedance of the statutory daily working hours, regardless of whether there is a simultaneous exceedance of the statutory weekly working hours of 48 and 45 hours respectively. In principle, overtime is prohibited, and any related agreement between the employer and the employee is null and void. However, the law itself permits the provision of overtime employment in specific cases. In the case of lawful overtime, the employee is entitled to receive, for each hour and up to the completion of 150 hours annually, compensation equal to the paid hourly wage increased by a 40% premium. Conversely, the compensation for lawful overtime employment exceeding 150 hours annually entails a 60% premium on the paid hourly wage.

=== Japan ===
In Japan the Labour Standards Act (労働基準法) of 1947 provides for an eight-hour work day and 40-hour workweek with at least one day off per week. The act requires a premium of at least 25% over the ordinary hourly wage for any overtime work, 35% for any work on prescribed off days, and an additional 25% for any work between 10 pm and 5 am. Employers must enter into an overtime agreement with a labour representative prior to any overtime work by employees, and this agreement must stipulate to the maximum number of overtime hours that an employee may work, which may be no more than 15 hours per week, 45 hours per month and 360 hours per year.

=== United States ===
==== Federal overtime law ====
In the United States the Fair Labor Standards Act of 1938 applies to employees in industries engaged in or producing goods for interstate commerce. The FLSA establishes a standard work week of 40 hours for certain kinds of workers, and mandates payment for overtime hours to those workers of one and one-half times the workers' normal rate of pay for any time worked above 40 hours.

The law creates two broad categories of employees,

- those who are "exempt" from the regulation and
- those who are "non-exempt".

Employers are not required to pay exempt employees overtime but must do so for non-exempt employees.

For federal government contracts, Federal Acquisition Regulation 22.103-5(b) regulates the payment of overtime premiums in some contracts where "the contract may require or involve the employment of laborers or mechanics".

===== Law Enforcement Availability Pay =====
Law Enforcement Availability Pay (LEAP) is a type of premium pay that is paid to federal law enforcement officers who are classified as GS-1811 or FP-2501, criminal investigator or special agent. Due to the nature of their work, criminal investigators are required to work, or be available to work, substantial amounts of "unscheduled duty". Availability pay is generally an entitlement that an agency must provide if the required conditions are met, but is optional in any agency's Office of the Inspector General that may employ fewer than five criminal investigators.

The following agencies are covered under LEAP:

- Air Force Office of Special Investigations (AFOSI)
- Bureau of Alcohol, Tobacco, Firearms and Explosives (ATF)
- Customs and Border Protection (CBP)
- Defense Criminal Investigative Service (DCIS)
- Department of Labor, Office of Inspector General (DOL-OIG)
- Drug Enforcement Administration (DEA)
- Diplomatic Security Service (DSS)
- Federal Bureau of Investigation (FBI)
- Federal Air Marshal Service (FAMS)
- General Services Administration, Office of Inspector General (GSA-OIG)
- Homeland Security Investigations, part of U.S. Immigration and Customs Enforcement (ICE-HSI)
- IRS Criminal Investigation Division (IRS-CI)
- Naval Criminal Investigative Service (NCIS)
- United States Marshals Service (USMS)
- United States Postal Inspection Service (USPIS)
- United States Secret Service (USSS)

==== Exempt ====
Independent contractors are not considered employees and therefore are not protected by the FLSA. Several factors determine whether a worker is an employee, who might be entitled to overtime compensation, or an independent contractor, who would not be so entitled. The employment agreement stating that a party is an independent contractor does not make it necessarily so. The nature of a job determines whether an employee is entitled to overtime pay, not employment status or the field of work.

Classes of workers who are exempt from the regulation include certain types of administrative, professional, and executive employees. To qualify as an administrative, professional, or executive employee and therefore not be entitled to overtime, three tests must be passed based on salary basis, duties, and salary level. There are many other classes of workers who may be exempt including outside salespeople, certain agricultural employees, certain live-in employees, and certain transportation employees. Employees can neither waive their FLSA protections nor abridge them by contract.

==== Protections ====
An employer may not retaliate against an employee for filing a complaint or instituting a proceeding based on the FLSA. An employer that engages in any form of verifiable retaliation would be liable under the Fair Labor Standards Act Section 216(b) for equitable relief including reinstatement, promotion, payment of lost wages, and payment of liquidated damages. Acts of retaliation include terminating employment, disrupting the workplace, threats, acts of physical violence, and constructive discharge.

==== Statistics ====
Out of approximately 120 million American workers, nearly 50 million are exempt from overtime laws (US Department of Labor, Wage and Hour Division, 1998). As of 2021, salaried workers making $684 per week or more are exempt from overtime pay (equivalent to $35,568 per year). In 2004, the United States was 7th out of 24 OECD countries in terms of annual working hours per worker. (See Working time for a complete listing.)

On August 23, 2004, President George W. Bush and the Department of Labor proposed changes to regulations governing implementation of the law. According to one study, the changes would have had significant impact on the number of workers covered by overtime laws and have exempted several million additional workers. The Bush administration maintained that the practical impact on working Americans would be minimal and that the changes would help clarify an outdated regulation. In particular, the new rules would have allowed more companies to offer flextime to their workers instead of overtime. The definition of exempt employees (ineligible for overtime) is regularly tested in the courts. A recent case is Encino Motorcars v. Navarro, which addresses the question of whether automobile dealer service advisors are eligible for overtime.

A company may harm themselves by docking a salaried employee for disciplinary reasons.

"Once pay is reduced using an hourly calculation, ... the employee is considered nonexempt, and so is every other worker in that job group."

Uber is an example of a company that, in various jurisdictions, has been subject to litigation regarding exemptions. The New York Times noted in 2017 that "Despite their appeal, the apps have faced a wave of criticism, including concerns over wheelchair accessibility and driver pay."

==== California overtime law ====
The state of California's overtime laws differ from federal overtime laws in many respects, and they involve overlapping statutes, regulations, and precedents that govern the compensation of employees in California.

- Governing federal law is the Fair Labor Standards Act (29 USC 201–219)
- California overtime law is codified in provisions of:

- the California Labor Code and in
- Wage orders of the Industrial Welfare Commission

California employers must comply with both, since there are two sources of applicable law (federal and state).

In California, based on California Labor Code 1171, only an employment relationship is required for overtime rules to apply. Under the California Industrial Welfare Commission Wage Orders, an "employer" is "any person ... who directly or indirectly, or through an agent or any other person, employs or exercises control over wages, hours, or working conditions of any person." Under the California Labor Code, an "employee" is "[any] person, including aliens and minors, rendering actual service in any business for an employer, whether gratuitously or for wages or pay, whether the wages or pay are measured by the standard of time, piece, task, commission, or other method of calculation, and whether the service is rendered on a commission, concessionaire, or other basis."

===== Coverage =====
Independent contractors are not employees covered by overtime laws and so it is important to determine if a worker is an independent contractor or an employee.

Foremost, pursuant to California Labor Code Section 510, non-exempt employees must be compensated at one and a half times the regular rate of pay for all hours worked in excess of eight hours in a workday, 40 hours in a workweek and the first eight hours of a seventh consecutive workday. Employees in California are entitled to double-time for working more than twelve hour workdays or more than eight hours on the seventh consecutive workday of a single workweek. Under federal law there are only 40 hour weekly overtime limits. The eight-hour overtime limit in California frequently gives rise to wage-and-hour litigation for violations of state (but not federal) labour laws.

For example, "comp time" schemes in which employers tell employees that since they worked 10 hours on Monday they can work 6 hours on Tuesday are illegal because even though employees are not working more than 40 hours for the purposes of overtime compensation under federal law, they are working more than 8 hours for purposes of California overtime law, and rounding the 6- and 10-hour workdays to two 8-hour workdays would cheat the employee out of two hours of overtime pay.

Perhaps the biggest difference between California and federal overtime law relates to the administrative exemption's "primarily engaged" in duties that meet the test for the exemption requirement, such as duties that involve exercising independent discretion and judgment as set forth in the controversial Order No. 4. Under the Fair Labor Standards Act "primarily engaged" does not necessarily mean at least half, but California wage-and-hour laws, working less than half of exempt duties automatically eliminates the overtime exemption.

== See also ==
- Eight-hour day
- Fair Labor Standards Act
- Flextime
- Work-life balance
- Effects of overtime
- Shturmovshchina
