= Work–life balance =

Intersection of work and personal life

Average annual hours actually worked per worker in OECD countries from 1970 to 2020

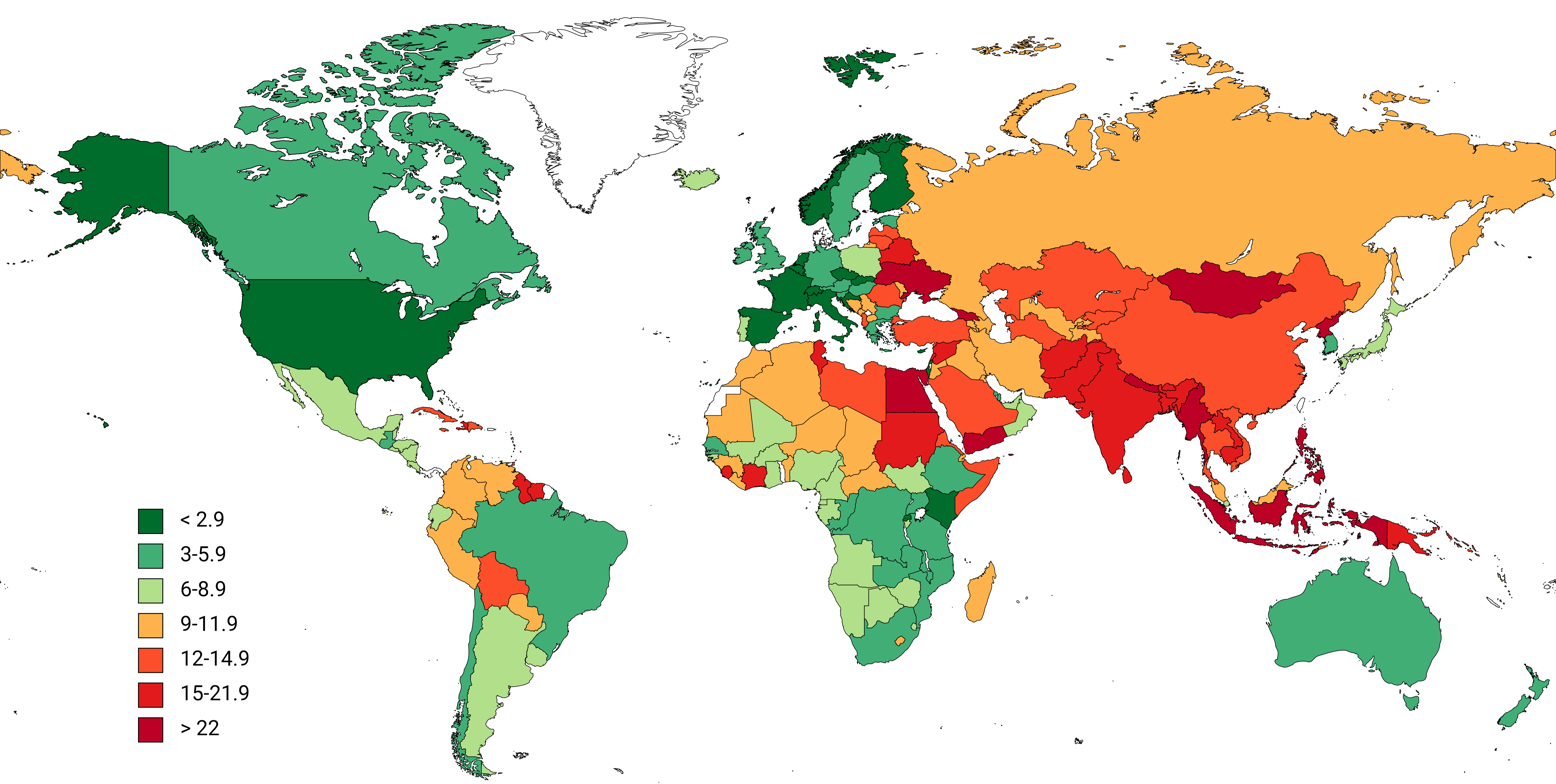
Deaths due to long working hours per 100,000 people (15+), joint study conducted by World Health Organization and International Labour Organization in 2016

In the intersection of work and personal life, the work–life balance is the equilibrium between the two. There are many aspects of one's personal life that can intersect with work, including family, leisure, and health. A work–life balance is bidirectional; for instance, work can interfere with private life, and private life can interfere with work. This balance or interface can be adverse in nature (e.g., work–life conflict) or can be beneficial (e.g., work–life enrichment) in nature. Recent research has shown that the work–life interface has become more boundary-less, especially for technology-enabled workers.

== Dominant theories of the relationship ==
Several theories explain different aspects of the relationship between work and family life. Boundary theory and border theory are the two fundamental theories that researchers have used to study these role conflicts. Other theories are built upon the foundations of these two theories. In the two decades since boundary theory and border theory were first proposed, the rise of Information and Communication Technologies (ICT) has drastically altered the work–life interface. Work can now be completed at any time and in any location, meaning that domains are more likely to be blended and boundaries barely exist.

Seven dominant theories have been utilized to explain this relationship on the boundary-border spectrum; These theories are: structural functionalism, segmentation, compensation, supplemental and reactive compensation, role enhancement, spillover, and work enrichment model.

=== Structural functionalism ===
The roots of this theory can be traced back to the early 20th century, when industrial revolution was separating economic work from the family home. The 19th century's technological advancements in machinery and manufacturing initiated the separation of work from family. However, it was not until the early 20th century that the first view of work–family theories started to take shape. Structural-functionalism was one of the dominant sociology theories of early 20th century and one of the first to resemble modern work–family theories.

The structural functionalism theory, which emerged following WWII, was largely influenced from the industrial revolution and the changes in the social role of men and women during this period. This theory implies that life is concerned mainly with two separate spheres: productive life which happens in the workplace and affective life which occurs at home. Structural functionalism theory believes in the existence of radical separation between work (institution, workplace, or market) and families. According to this theory, these two (workplace and family) work best "when men and women specialize their activities in separate spheres, women at home doing expressive work and men in the workplace performing instrumental tasks".

=== Greedy institutions ===
It has been argued that the work–family conflicts, in particular role conflicts, can be interpreted in terms of Lewis A. Coser's concept of "greedy institutions". These institutions are called "greedy" in the sense that they make all-encompassing demands on the commitment and loyalty of individuals, and tend to discourage involvement in other social spheres. Institutions such as religious orders, sects, academia, top level sports, the military and senior management have been interpreted as greedy institutions. On the other hand, also the family has been interpreted as a greedy institution in consideration of the demands placed on a caretaker. When a person is involved in two greedy institutions—be it child care and university, or family and the military, or others—task and role conflicts arise.

A 2020 LinkedIn survey based on over 2.9 million responses concluded that employees struggling with work–life balance were 4.4 times more likely to show symptoms of occupational burnout.

=== Segmentation ===
Based on this theory work and family do not affect each other, since they are segmented and independent from each other. The literature also reports the usage of the terms compartmentalization, independence, separateness, disengagement, neutrality, and detachment to describe this theory.

=== Compensation Theory ===
In 1979, Piotrkowski argued that according to this theory employees "look to their homes as havens, [and] look to their families as sources of satisfaction lacking in the occupational sphere." What distinguishes compensation theory from the previous theories is that, in compensation theory, for the first time, the positive effect of work to family has been recognized.

=== Supplemental and reactive compensation ===
Supplemental and reactive compensation theories are two dichotomies of compensation theory which were developed during the late 1980s and the early 1990s. While compensation theory describes the behavior of employees in pursuing an alternative reward in the other sphere, supplemental and reactive compensation theories try to describe the reason behind the work–family compensation behavior of employees.

=== Role enhancement theory ===
According to this theory, the combination of certain roles has a positive, rather than a negative effect on well-being. This theory states that participation in one role is made better or easier by virtue of participation in the other role. Moreover, this theory acknowledges the negative effect of the work–family relationship, in which, only beyond a certain upper limit may overload and distress occur, however, the central focus of this perspective is mainly on the positive effects of work and family relationship, such as resource enhancement.

=== The negative effects of spillover ===
Spillover is a process by which an employee's experience in one domain affects their experience in another domain. Theoretically, spillover is perceived to be one of two types: positive or negative. Spillover as the most popular view of relationship between work and family, considers multidimensional aspects of work and family relationship.

According to a 2021 study by Indeed, 53% of on-site workers found it challenging to stop thinking about work in their spare time.

=== Work enrichment model ===
This theory is one of the recent models for explaining the relationship between work and family. According to this model, experience in one role (work or family) will enhance the quality of life in the other role. In other words, this model tries to explain the positive effects of the work–family relationship.

== Work–family conflict ==
Work and family studies historically focus on studying the conflict between different roles that individuals have in their society, specifically their roles at work, and their roles as a family member.

Work–family conflict is defined as interrole conflict where the participation in one role interfere with the participation in another. Greenhaus and Beutell (1985) differentiate three sources for conflict between work and family:

1. "time devoted to the requirements of one role makes it difficult to fulfill requirements of another" (p. 76);
2. "strain from participation in one role makes it difficult to fulfill requirements of another" (p. 76);
3. "specific behaviors required by one role make it difficult to fulfill the requirements of another" (p. 76).

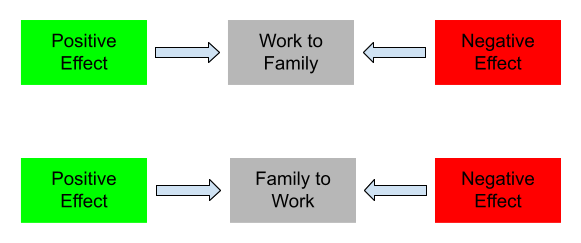
Adopted from Lavassani & Movahedi (2014), Work–life interface

Conceptually, the conflict between work and family is bi-directional. Scholars distinguish between what is termed work-to-family conflict (WFC), and what is termed family-to-work conflict (FWC). This bi-directional view is displayed in the figure on the right.

Accordingly, WFC might occur when experiences at work interfere with family life like extensive, irregular, or inflexible work hours. Family-to-work conflict occurs when experiences in the family interfere with work life. For example, a parent may take time off from work in order to take care of a sick child. Although these two forms of conflict—WFC and FWC—are strongly correlated with each other, more attention has been directed at WFC. This may because family demands are more elastic than the boundaries and responsibilities of the work role. Also, research has found that work roles are more likely to interfere with family roles than family roles are likely to interfere with work role.

Allen, Herst, Bruck, and Sutton (2000) describe in their paper three categories of consequences related to WFC: work-related outcomes (e.g., job satisfaction or job performance), nonwork-related outcomes (e.g., life or family satisfaction), and stress-related outcomes (e.g., depression or substance abuse). For example, WFC has been shown to be negatively related to job satisfaction whereas the association is more pronounced for females.

The vast majority of studies investigating the consequences of WFC were interrogating samples from Western countries, such as U.S. Therefore, the generalization of their findings is in question. Fortunately, there is also literature studying WFC and its consequences in other cultural contexts, such as Taiwan and India. Lu, Kao, Cooper, Allen, Lapierre, O'Driscoll, Poelmans, Sanchez, and Spector (2009) could not find any cultural difference related in work-related and nonwork-related outcomes of WFC when they compared Great Britain and Taiwan. Likewise, Pal and Saksvik (2008) also did not detect specific cultural differences between employees from Norway and India. Nevertheless, more cross-cultural research is needed to understand the cultural dimensions of the WFC construct.

The research concerning interventions to reduce WFC is currently still very limited. As an exception, Nielson, Carlson, and Lankau (2001) showed that having a supportive mentor on the job correlates negatively with the employee's WFC. However, other functions of mentoring, like the role model aspect, appear to have no effect on WFC. Therefore, the mechanisms how having a mentor influences the work–family interface remain unclear.

In terms of primary and secondary intervention there are some results. Hammer, Kossek, Anger, Bodner, and Zimmerman (2011) conducted a field study and showed that training supervisors to show more family supportive behavior, led to increased physical health in employees that were high in WFC. At the same time, employees having low WFC scores even decreased in physical health. This shows that even though interventions can help, it is important to focus on the right persons. Otherwise, the intervention damages more than it helps.

Another study (Wilson, Polzer-Debruyne, Chen, & Fernandes, 2007) showed that training employees helps to reduce shift work related WFC. Additionally, this training is more effective, if the partner of the focal person is also participating. Therefore, integrating the family into the intervention seems to be helpful too.

There are various additional factors that might influence the effectiveness of WFC interventions. For example, some interventions seem more adequate to reduce family-to-work conflict (FWC) than WFC (Hammer et al., 2011). More research is still needed, before optimal treatments against WFC can be derived.

== Work–family enrichment ==
Work–family enrichment or work–family facilitation is a form of positive spillover, defined as a process whereby involvement in one domain establishes benefits and/or resources which then may improve performance or involvement in another domain (Greenhaus & Powell, 2006). For example, involvement in the family role is made easier by participation in the work role (Wayne, Musisca, & Fleeson, 2004).

In contrast to work–family conflict which is associated with several negative consequences, work–family enrichment is related to positive organizational outcomes such as job satisfaction and effort (Wayne et al., 2004). There are several potential sources enrichment can arise from. Examples are that resources (e.g., positive mood) gained in one role lead to better functioning in the other role (Sieber, 1974) or skills and attitudes that are acquired in one role are useful in the other role (Crouter, 1984).

Conceptually, enrichment between work and family is bi-directional. Most researchers make the distinction between what is termed work–family enrichment, and what is termed family–work enrichment. Work–family enrichment occurs, when ones involvement in work provides skills, behaviors, or positive mood which influences the family life in a positive way. Family-work enrichment, however, occurs when ones involvement in the family domain results in positive mood, feeling of success or support that help individuals to cope better with problems at work, feel more confident and in the end being more productive at work (Wayne, et al., 2004).

Several antecedents of work–family enrichment have been proposed. Personality traits, such as extraversion and openness for experience have been shown to be positively related to work–family enrichment (Wayne et al., 2004). Next to individual antecedents, organizational circumstances such as resources and skills gained at work foster the occurrence of work–family enrichment (Voydanoff, 2004). For example, abilities such as interpersonal communication skills are learned at work and may then facilitate constructive communication with family members at home.

== The role of organization and supervisor ==
Research has focused especially on the role of the organization and the supervisor in the reduction of WFC. Results provide evidence for the negative association between the availability of family friendly resources provided by the work place and WFC. General support by the organization aids the employees to deal with work family issues so that organizational support is negatively connected to WFC (Kossek, Pichler, Bodner, & Hammer, 2011). Furthermore, Kossek et al. (2011) showed that work family specific support has a stronger negative connection with work family conflict. Results by other researchers show that family friendly organizational culture also has an indirect effect on WFC via supervisor support and coworker support (Dolcoy & Daley, 2009).

Some research also shows that the utilization of provided resources such as child care support or flexible work hours has no longitudinal connection with WFC (Hammer, Neal, Newson, Brockwood, & Colton, 2005). This result speaks against common assumptions. Also, the supervisor has a social-support function for his/her subordinates. As Moen and Yu (2000) showed supervisor support is an indicator for lower levels of WFC. Further support for this hypothesis stems from a study conducted by Thompson and Prottas (2005). Keeping in mind the support function, organizations should provide trainings for the supervisors and conduct the selection process of new employees. Similar as for organizational support, the meta-analysis by Kossek et al. (2011) showed that general supervisor is negatively connected to WFC. Again, work–family-specific supervisor support has a stronger negative connection with WFC. Aside from support by the organization and the supervisor, research points out a third source of work-place support: The coworker. The informal support by the coworker not only correlates with positive aspects such as job satisfaction, but is also negatively associated with negative variables such as WFC (Dolcos & Doley, 2009; Thompson & Prottas, 2005).

In terms of work–family enrichment, supervisors and organizations are also relevant, since they are able to provide with important resource (e.g., skills and financial benefits) and positive affect.

== Research methods ==
A methodological review by Casper, Eby, Bordeaux, Lockwood, and Lambert (2007) summarizes the research methods used in the area of work–family research from 1980 to 2003. Their main findings are that study samples do include diverse family types, and most research relies on surveys.

== History ==
Lillian Moller Gilbreth established the philosophical basis for work-life balance.

== See also ==
- Achievement ideology
- All work and no play makes Jack a dull boy
- Annual leave
- Burnout
- Critique of work
- Downshifting (lifestyle)
- Effects of overtime
- Four-day workweek
- List of minimum annual leave by country
- Marx's theory of alienation
- Need for achievement
- Niksen
- Overwork
- Paid time off
- Productivism
- Return on time invested (ROTI)
- Right to rest and leisure
- Six-hour day
- Social alienation
- Workaholic
- Work–life balance in Germany
- Work–life balance in South Korea
- Work–life balance in the United States
