= Four-day workweek =

Arrangement to work four days per week

A four-day workweek is an arrangement where a workplace or place of education has its employees or students work or attend school, college or university over the course of four days per week rather than the more customary five-day workweek. This arrangement can be a part of flexible working hours, and is sometimes used to cut costs.

The four-day week movement has grown considerably in recent years, with increasing numbers of businesses and organizations around the world trialing and moving permanently to a four-day working week of around 32 hours, with no less pay for workers. Most of these businesses and organizations have involved white collar work, and found that a four-day week is a win-win for employees and employers, as trials have indicated that it leads to a better work-life balance, lower stress-levels, and increased productivity, mainly by eliminating wasted work time. An overwhelming majority of studies report that a four-day week leads to increased productivity and decreased stress, though experts question whether this increased profit arrangement is possible in blue collar work, where there may be little wasted time, or workers would be required to work faster to maintain the same productivity, potentially increasing stress levels and decreasing safety.

== History ==
The five-day workweek is a cultural norm; the result of early 1900s union advocacy to reduce the six-day workweek, which led to the invention of the weekend. In the early 20th century, when the average work week in developed nations was reduced from around 60 to 40 hours, it was expected that further decreases would occur over time. In 1930, economist John Maynard Keynes estimated that technological change and productivity improvements would make a 15-hour work week possible within a couple of generations, though economist Nicholas Crafts argued that Keynes neglected to consider increased life expectancy, resulting in longer retirement periods, and the entry of women into the workforce, resulting in a more equal distribution of domestic labour between sexes.

In 1933, the United States nearly passed a 30-hour workweek bill, opposed by big business, which collapsed after a pivot toward full employment during the Great Depression. In 1956, then US Vice President Richard Nixon promised Americans they would only have to work four days "in the not-too-distant future".

The four-day workweek gained renewed interest after the COVID-19 pandemic increased concerns over burnout and workplace flexibility.

During the 2023 United Auto Workers strike, organizers pushed for a 32-hour workweek inspired by union activism from the 1930s and 1940s.

== Variations ==
Most advocates for a four-day working week argue for a fixed work schedule, resulting in shorter weeks (e.g. four 8-hour workdays for a total of 32 hours). This follows the 100-80-100 model: 100% pay for 80% of the time, in exchange for a commitment to maintain at least 100% productivity. However, some companies have introduced a four-day week based on a compressed work schedule: in the so-called "4/10 work week," the widely used 40 weekly work hours are distributed across four days instead of five, resulting in 10-hour workdays (hence "four-ten").

The 9/80 work schedule can be seen as an intermediate between a compressed 4 day week and a 5-day week: every 2 weeks, a 4-day work-week alternates with a 5-day work-week.

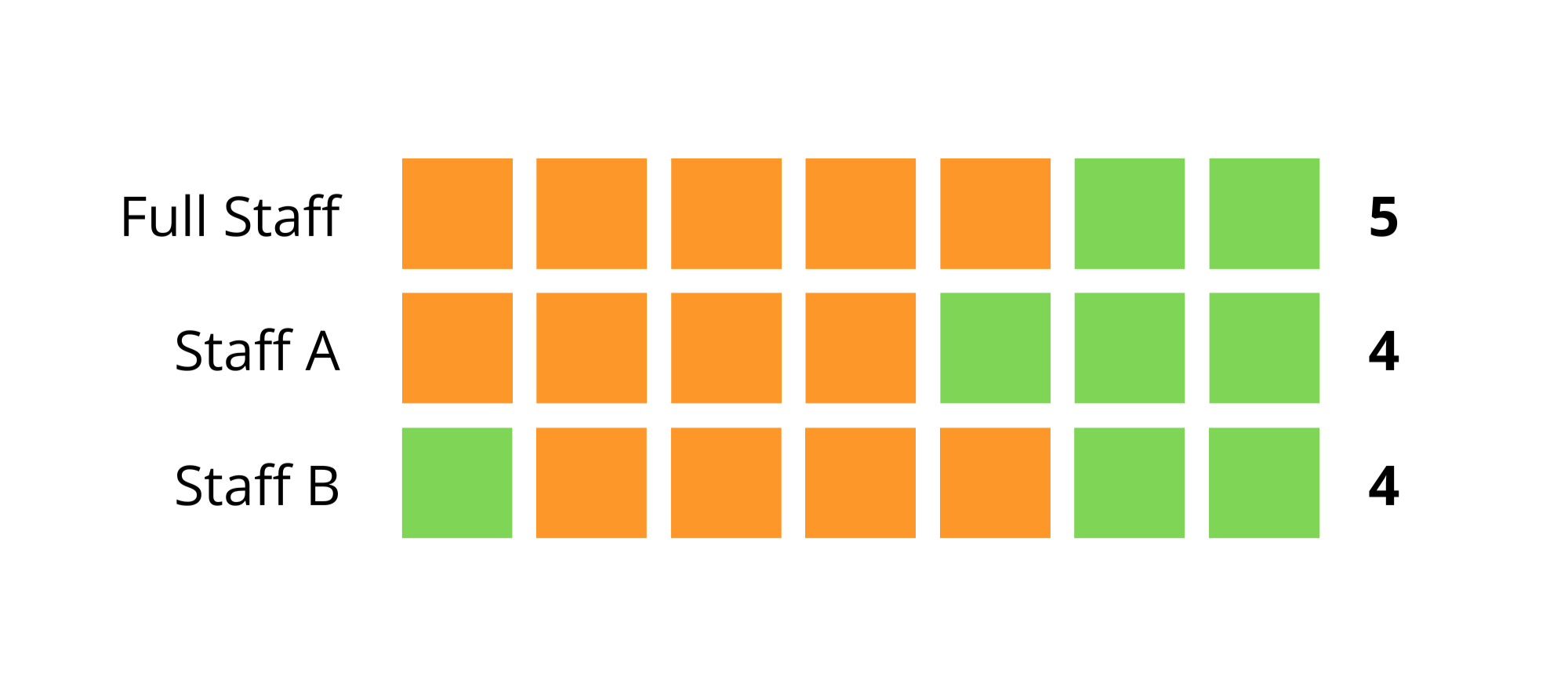
Five-day business hours coverage under a split four-day workweek model

The resulting schedule may look different depending on the way the four-day week is implemented: in some variants, Friday becomes the permanent non-working day, giving employees three consecutive days off over the weekend; some workplaces split the day off among the staff, with half taking Monday off and the other half taking Friday off; sometimes the day off is added in the middle of the week such as a Wednesday, allowing for a mid-week break; and, in some cases the day off changes from week to week, depending on the company's current goals and workload.

According to the Marketplace radio program, the four day work week can be viewed as a white collar phenomenon. It has also been suggested that some blue collar jobs would see increased stress for workers if 100% of the five day productivity was expected in a four-day week. But advances in automation make the four day work week just as relevant for blue collar workers.

== Rationale ==
The push towards implementing the four-day week has remained loosely relevant within the contemporary workplace due to the various possible benefits it may yield. Although mostly untested, these benefits mainly lie within increased cost-cutting, productivity, and work–life balance.

A study from the University of Massachusetts concluded that a four-day workweek would cut humanity's carbon footprint by nearly 30%.

An increase in remote work during the COVID-19 pandemic led to an increase in the desire for flexible work arrangements.

== Active trials ==
In 2022, not-for-profit advocacy group 4 Day Week Global launched a series of six-month trials for companies in:

- Ireland (17 companies, February to August);
- the United States and Canada (38 companies, April to October);
- the United Kingdom (UK) (61 companies with around 2,900 employees, June to December). The program, which allows employees to get 100% compensation for working 80% of their usual hours, is being used by more than 61 businesses with around 2,900 employees. Participating businesses include local fish and chip shops, charities, and office-based software developers and employment agencies. The study is being conducted by Autonomy, a think tank, researchers from Cambridge and Oxford universities, and 4 Day Week, an organization that advocates for a reduced workweek. The project will be overseen by academics from Boston College in the US, Oxford, and Cambridge universities, together with the think tank Autonomy. The pilot has been viewed as a success with many of the programs retaining the four day work week after the pilot program was originally scheduled to end.

and

- Australia and New Zealand (20 companies, August to February 2023).

Employees of participating companies will work one less day a week with no reduction in pay. The UK pilot is the world's largest trial of a four-day week to date.

Since the COVID-19 pandemic, several governments have proposed and launched four-day working week trials:

- Scotland announced it is putting £10 million towards a trial, as part of its promise to pursue a wellbeing economy.
- The Japanese government's 2021 annual economic policy guidelines recommended that companies allow their workers to opt for a four-day work week, as part of an initiative aimed at improving work-life balance in the country.
- Belgium allowed employees the ability to request a four-day work week through the compression of their 38-hour week.
- France is currently trialing a 4 day work week through the social enterprise 4jours.work with the academic research part being carried out by emlyon business school, and civil society support (CFC-CGC, 4th largest union, B Lab France amongst others. Although the debate has started in the 90s thanks to Pierre Larrouturou and Antoine Riboud (Danone CEO), France had been lagging in terms of shorter workweek because of the 35 hour workweek implemented in the late 90s.

Prime Ministers Jacinda Ardern of New Zealand and Sanna Marin of Finland have each proposed a four-day workweek as a consideration.

== Major trial results ==
Sociology professor Juliet Schor studied more than 200 companies with a total of 8,000 employees and found that a four-day workweek yielded better employee retention, less use of sick and personal days, and better outcomes for employees in all 20 well-being metrics measured, including lower stress, lower burnout, and increased physical health. She stated that the optimum arrangement is called 100-80-100, whereby employees produce 100% of their previous output, work 80% of previous hours, and get paid 100% of previous wages; but that this is not achievable for all companies and depends on productivity improvements.

=== Europe ===
==== Iceland ====
Two trials in Iceland between 2015 and 2019 in which working hours were reduced to 35 hours a week without pay reduction for 2,500 workers resulted in "dramatically increased" well-being, and improved work-life balance and stress ratings from employees, measured by a range of indicators such as burnout and perceived stress. Productivity also remained the same, or improved across the majority of all the workplaces, according to UK think tank Autonomy and the Icelandic Association for Sustainable Democracy. While framed as a "four-day week", the trial was for reduced working hours, not necessarily compressed within four days, from 40 to 35 and 36 hours. The study ran two large-scale trials and included more than 1% of Iceland's entire population. The vast majority of the workplaces removed up to three hours from the week, not eight, as would be needed in a four-day week. Agreements to reduce work hours following the trial have led to a reduction of an hour or less. Due to these factors, the study was perceived to be an "overwhelming success", with 86% of the population working in wage labour later receiving permanent reductions in time spent at work through negotiations.

==== Spain ====
In 2023, Valencia, Spain, implemented a pilot program scheduling local holidays on four consecutive Mondays, resulting in a four-day workweek for 360,000 workers. This initiative, designed by the left-wing Compromis coalition, showed notable health benefits, including reduced stress and improved air quality due to decreased vehicle emissions. Participants developed healthier habits, although there was an increase in tobacco and alcohol use. The program also positively impacted children's well-being through improved parental work-life balance. Hospitality and tourism saw increased activity, while retail experienced a decline in sales.

==== United Kingdom ====
As of July 2022, more than 80 UK companies and organisations are recognised as having permanently implemented a four-day working week of fewer than 35 hours, with most doing fewer than 32 hours. These include: the consultancy Think Productive, which has adopted a four-day week since 2011; Cornwall-based accountancy firm Whyfield; Bristol and Devon-based Barefoot Architects; Atom Bank, Leeds-based recruitment agency Charlton Morris; Dorset-based Gungho Marketing; Southampton-based engineering firm Highfield Professional Solutions; and, Edinburgh-based Vault City Brewing.

Of the 73 enterprises in the study, 41 firms answered to a survey midway through the plan. Nearly 86% of those polled stated they would continue to follow the four-day workweek guideline when the experiment is over. According to 4 Day Week, employees experienced decreased childcare and commute expenditures, which resulted in an average saving of £3,232.40 annually, or around £269.36 per month, for a parent with two children. As 50% of workers claim improved productivity during the period, the Manufacturing Technology Centre (MTC) announced it will permanently provide a four-day workweek to its 820 employees (although with 36 hours instead of 48). According to Loughborough University, which undertook an external study, the staff's reaction was "overwhelmingly favourable," and for more recent hires, the policies were one of the primary draws. According to survey results, maintaining a "work-life balance" was important to respondents. However, some companies in the scheme found the move to reduced hours "trickier".

A first for a UK local body, South Cambridgeshire District Council (SCDC) opted to proceed with the experiment of a four-day (30-hour) workweek for roughly 470 desk-based employees, who received the same full-time compensation during the trial, planned to last three months starting in January 2023. The decision, according to council leader Bridget Smith, will improve employee welfare. Joe Ryle, director of the 4 Day Week Campaign, said: "The decision by South Cambridgeshire District Council to outline plans to become the first ever UK local authority to trial a four-day week is historic and should be applauded." However, Anthony Browne, South Cambridgeshire MP, criticised the move, accusing the SCDC of "charging the taxpayer for the privilege". The district council had planned extend its trial until April 2024 but in June 2023 local government minister, Lee Rowley, ordered that the council end the trial because it was not permitted under the Local Government Act. In the face of opposition from Conservative ministers, backed by the TaxPayers' Alliance, shorter hours were to be introduced in neighbouring Cambridge city council, and eight other English councils were said to be considering testing shorter working weeks. Glasgow city council was monitoring the pilot programmes and described the four-day working week as "an aspirational position".

Regarding the 4 Day Week Global trial organised by think-tank Autonomy and researchers at Boston College and the universities of Cambridge and Oxford, the trial involved 61 companies and almost 3,000 workers The trial's findings suggest that more than 90% of companies that adopted a four-day working week in the UK will continue. Specifically, 18 firms decided to maintain the four-day working week on a permanent basis, and 38 others will continue with the trial. Over the trial period, revenue at participating companies rose on average more than a third compared with the same time in 2021, and the number of staff leaving companies fell significantly.

According to Peter Dowd MP, cutting the number of hours worked each week to 32 would provide "every British worker the chance of moving to a four-day week", as he introduced a bill to this effect. The bill to mandate 4 days workweek was debated in the House of Commons on October 18, 2022. The bill lapsed without moving to the committee stages or to the Lords, so it never became law, and would need to be reintroduced before having a possibility of being law.

In September 2023 the Scottish government announced the trial of a four-day working week by the end of 2023.

=== Oceania ===
==== Perpetual Guardian in New Zealand ====
In New Zealand, trust company Perpetual Guardian announced in February 2018 that it would begin trialing a four-day work week in March 2018. The six-week trial, initiated by founder Andrew Barnes, saw the company's 240-plus staff nominating a day off each week whilst still receiving full pay. The trial, held in March and April 2018, attracted international media attention. In late March 2018, Barnes said that the trial was going well with staff reporting more time for their families, hobbies, completing their to-do lists and doing home maintenance.

The trial, which was tracked and assessed by the University of Auckland Business School and Auckland University of Technology, was described as a success and "a total win-win". Perpetual Guardian then extended the four-day work week scheme permanently. The trial saw increased productivity, customer engagement levels, and staff engagement; reduced staff stress levels; and improved work–life balance. The company's revenue remained stable while costs went down, due to less power being used throughout the period.

The trial sparked publicity both in New Zealand and internationally.

The initiative was held up by Barnes as a way of helping to close the gender pay gap and increase diversity in the workforce. Barnes also held the scheme up as a potential blueprint for the workplace of the future, ensuring companies were attractive to millennials and easing Auckland's traffic congestion.

However, while four-day work weeks were deemed a success for most, not everyone involved within the Perpetual Guardian trial was able to adapt, with some reporting feeling increased pressure to complete work within a shorter time frame, particularly around deadlines.

=== Asia ===
==== Microsoft Japan ====
Microsoft Japan conducted a trial four-day work week in summer 2019, granting workers paid leave on Fridays. At the same time it cut the length of most meetings from a full hour to half an hour, and capped attendance at five employees. For the duration of the trial, the company reported a 23% reduction in electricity costs. Sales per employee increased 40% during the last year's same period.

==== Singapore ====
Since 2021, Raffles Institution in Singapore has adopted a four-day school week for junior college students (Years 5 and 6), keeping Wednesdays free of formal lessons. The mid-week "gap day" is used for rest, self-study, co-curricular activities, or enrichment programmes. Introduced after the shift to online learning during the COVID-19 pandemic, the change aimed to improve students' well-being and time management. According to The Straits Times, 89% of JC2 and 95% of JC1 students surveyed in 2021 found the gap day beneficial. A-level results remained unaffected by the new schedule.

=== North America ===
==== Utah state government ====
In 2008, employees of the Utah state government all began working ten-hour days from Monday to Thursday. By closing state government offices on Fridays, the state expected to save on operating costs such as electricity, heat, air conditioning, and gasoline for state-owned vehicles. Utah ended this practice however, in 2011, with the Utah Legislature overriding Governor Gary Herbert's veto of five-day work week legislation. Many local governments have had alternative schedules for many years.

==== K-12 public schools in the United States ====
Due to budgetary problems, public schools in Hawaii closed on 17 Fridays in 2010. In 2002, it was reported that over 100 school districts in rural areas in the United States have changed the school week to a four-day week; most also extended each school day by an hour or more. The changes were often made in order to save money on transportation, heating, and substitute teachers.

According to a 2021 study, which examined four-day school weeks in Oregon, the switch to four-day school weeks led to lower test scores in reading and math.

==== Higher education in the United States ====
In January 2022, D'Youville University announced a transition to a 4-day, 32-hour work week for all staff and administration without any change to employees pay or benefits. The employees were previously working 37.5 hours per week. This initiative was a follow-up to a pilot program in 2020 which received positive feedback from employees. The program started as a 6-month trial before eventually being made permanent.

==== Kickstarter and Union Strike ====
In March 2022, Kickstarter announced it would experiment with a four-day, 32-hour workweek.

=== Africa ===
==== The Gambia civil service ====
In The Gambia, a four-day work week was introduced for public officials by president Yahya Jammeh, effective February 1, 2013. Working hours were limited to Monday through Thursday, 08:00 to 18:00, with Friday designated as a day of rest to allow residents more time for prayer and agriculture. This regulation was abolished in early 2017 by his successor, president Adama Barrow, who decreed a half-day of work on Fridays.

== See also ==
- Critique of work
- 35-hour workweek
- Furlough
- Six-hour day
- Three-Day Week
- Working time
- Weekend
- Work–life interface
