= Annual leave =

Paid time off from work

Annual leave, also known as statutory leave, is a period of paid time off work granted by employers to employees to be used for whatever the employee wishes, e.g. vacation, personal events or relaxation. Depending on the employer's policies, differing number of days may be offered, and the employee may be required to give a certain amount of advance notice, may have to coordinate with the employer to be sure that staffing is available during the employee's absence, and other requirements may have to be met. The vast majority of countries today mandate a minimum amount of paid annual leave by law.

Among the larger countries, China requires at least five days' paid annual leave and India requires two days of paid leave for every month worked. The United States mandates no minimum paid leave, treating it as a perk rather than a right.

== History ==
An early instance of paid time off, in the late 19th century in Australia, was by Alfred Edments who gave every employee a fortnight's holiday on full pay, and when ill, Edments continued to pay their salaries.

In France, first paid leave - no salary deduction under 15 days per year - is introduced for civil servants, only, in 1854.

== Leave ==
Most countries have labour laws that mandate employers give a certain number of paid time-off days per year to workers.

In China, minimum annual leave entitlements and how leave is earned and managed are governed by the Employee Paid Annual Leave Regulations. Employees are entitled to 5, 10, or 15 days of annual paid annual leave depending on years of service. Public holidays and regular days off do not count toward annual leave, and leave can be scheduled in full or split throughout the year. Unused leave does not generally carry over, and employees are entitled to three times their regular daily wages for each day of unused annual leave under the regulations. The Regulations also require county labor regulators to overseeing and enforce employer compliance within their jurisdictions.

Canada requires at least two weeks, which increases to three weeks for employees that have worked for a certain number of years (In Saskatchewan this entitlement starts out at three weeks and increases to four weeks). An additional fourth week is provided to federally regulated workers after working for a further number of years.

In the European Union the countries can set freely the minimum, but it has to be at least equivalent to 4 working weeks. In the Netherlands this is achieved by mandating at minimum 4 times the number of contracted hours in a person's working week; e.g. if someone works 4 days of 7 hours a week, the annual leave hours a year is 112 at minimum.

Full-time employees in Australia are entitled to four weeks which is 20 annual leave days a year.

In New Zealand, 20 days' paid leave is also the normal minimum in addition to the 11 paid statutory holidays (e.g. Christmas, New Year's Day). However, many employers offer 5 or more weeks, especially in the public sector.

Some countries, such as Denmark and Italy, or particular companies may mandate summer holidays in specific periods.

Argentina has different labour laws for public employment and private employment. Public employees have between a minimum of 21 days paid to 45 days paid for vacations (including holidays and weekends). Private employees have between a minimum of 14 paid days to 28 paid days (including holidays and weekends). In both cases are always relying on the years of service. The more years the worker has worked the more days of paid vacation they will have.

UK employers offer a minimum of 5.6 weeks (capped at 28 days) per annum of statutory annual leave. Some employers may include Bank Holidays (eight in England and Wales, nine in Scotland, ten in Northern Ireland) within the worker's annual leave. Workers also have the legal right to paternity/maternity pay as part of this, as well as requesting holiday at the same time as sick leave. For regular-hours workers (full- or part-time), employers must pay at least 4 weeks of the worker's statutory entitlement at their "normal" rate of pay, and the remaining 1.6 weeks (with the total capped at 28 days) at a "basic" rate of pay.

US federal law does not require employers to grant any vacation or holidays, though, as of 2007, only about 25 percent of all employees receive no paid vacation time or paid holidays. Due to the lack of federal legislative requirements, paid leave in the US is mainly a matter of employment contracts and labor union agreements. Some jurisdictions within the US, including the states of Maine and Nevada, require paid time-off days.

In March 2026, 80 percent of private-industry workers had access to paid vacation benefits, according to the U.S. Bureau of Labor Statistics.

Region	Mandated paid vacation days
Argentina	10–20
Australia	20 (Note: In Australia, employees receive annual leave hours equivalent to 4 times the number of contractual hours per work week.)
Austria	25
Belgium	20
Brazil	20–30
Canada	10–20
Colombia	15
Czech Republic	20
Denmark	25–30
Finland	20–25
France	25
Germany	20–30
Greece	20
Hong Kong	0 in the first year, then 7–14
India	25
Indonesia	12
Italy	20
Japan	10–20
Luxembourg	26
Malaysia	8 in the first two years, 12 in the following three years, 16 thereafter
Mexico	12
Netherlands	20 (Note: In the Netherlands, employees receive annual leave hours equivalent to 4 times the number of contractual hours per work week.)
New Zealand	20
Poland	20–26
Portugal	22–25
Russian Federation	28
Singapore	7–14
South Africa	15–21
South Korea	11–15
Spain	22
Sweden	25–30
Switzerland	20
Turkey	14–26
United Kingdom	28
United States	0
Note: Paid vacation excludes paid public holidays.

=== Consecutive holidays ===
Consecutive holidays refers to holidays that occur in a group without working days in between. In the late 1990s, the Japanese government passed a law that increased the likelihood of consecutive holidays by moving holidays from fixed days to a relative position in a month, such as the second Monday.

In many Western countries, consecutive holidays occur for Christmas/Boxing Day, New Year's Eve/New Year's Day, and Good Friday/Easter Monday, which also straddle a weekend.

== See also ==
- Administrative leave
- Furlough
- Holidays with Pay Convention (Revised), 1970
- List of minimum annual leave by country
- Long service leave
- Right to rest and leisure
