= Six-hour day =

Alternative to eight-hour workday

The six-hour day is a schedule by which the employees or other members of an institution (which may also be, for example, a school) spend six hours contributing. This is in contrast to the widespread eight-hour day, or any other time arrangement. It has also been proposed as an alternative or addition to the four-day week, another proposed way to reduce working time.

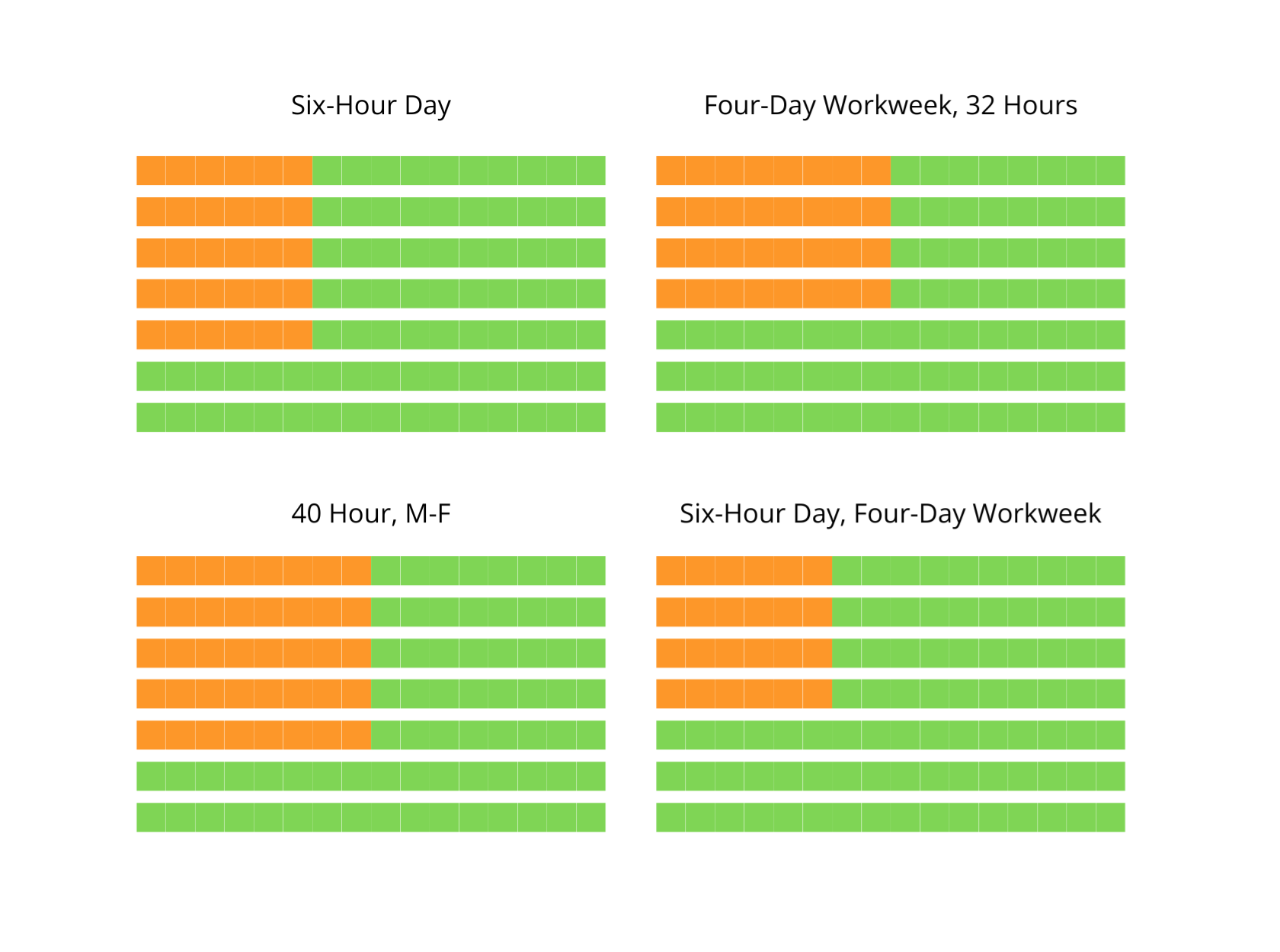
Differences in working hours during waking hours between six-hour workday, four-day workweek, and 9 to 5 work schedules

== By country ==
=== Australia ===
In Australia, the six-hour day and four-day week is supported by the Australian Greens.

=== Finland ===
In 2020, the Finnish Prime Minister Sanna Marin advocated for a change towards implementing a six-hour working day.

The result of a Finnish study showed positive effects.

In 2022 the Communist Party of Finland advocated for a six-hour working day.

=== Italy ===
In Italy, the public sector used to have a schedule of 6 hours a day for 6 days a week, i.e. since 8 a.m. to 2 p.m. Monday to Saturday. Public employees used to be paid less than their private colleagues, as they worked 36 hours per week instead of 40.

When, starting in the 1980s, pressure increased for a 'long week-end', meaning a free Saturday, in most sectors the 6 hours of Saturdays were moved either by extending ending time at 3:12 p.m. or, most often, to two working afternoons of 3 hours each. This solution also prevents public employees to have a second job, that was previously considered acceptable.

Present-day Communist Party (Italy) advocates for a widespread six-hour workday. Their electoral result for last parliament elections, however, has been as low as 0.09%.

=== Norway ===
The Red Party (Norway) has advocated for a six-hour workday.

=== Sweden ===
The 6 hour workday has been subject to reoccurring debate since the early 70's after the prominent sociologist and politician Alva Myrdal proposed to implement it to Sveriges socialdemokratiska kvinnoförbund. Today there are more than a few examples of companies which already have a 6 hour workday in Sweden, and the notion of a trend towards a six-hour workday has also been mentioned. Since 2002 there is a Toyota car mechanic with a six hour workday in the small town of Mölndal. This reduction from eight to six hour shifts led to higher profitability and was implemented without any decrease in wages. According to Martin Banck who manages the shop "[our employees] have more energy. [They're] more alert. More efficient. I promise: you perform 20-30% more in six hours than eight." Several small-scale implementations of the concept have been trialed in Sweden, including the private and public sectors. In Gothenburg, an experiment with 70 nurses over 18 months found decreases in sick leave, better self-reported health as well as an increase in productivity, with a cost of 1.3 million USD.

Two major parties support cutting the working hours in Sweden as of 2022. The party Vänsterpartiet (The Left Party) is advocating a 6 hour working day without decreased pay. Miljöpartiet de gröna (The Green Party) has the goal of a 30 hour workweek.

Other parties advocating for 6 hour working day are: the Communist Party of Sweden and the Communist Party (Sweden).

According to a survey done by Sifo in 2022 more than half of those surveyed would rather work fewer hours than get a pay raise. This tendency was stronger among surveyed women and those who self-reported as being likely to vote for Vänsterpartiet, Socialdemokraterna, or Miljöpartiet. The majority of Swedes are in favour of shorter working weeks, with the greatest support from women and people who are engaged in blue-collar jobs.

=== Switzerland ===
The Swiss Party of Labour advocates for the introduction of a reduced working day (even though they ask for 35 hours, not 30).

== See also ==
- Critique of work
- 35-hour workweek
- Four-day workweek
- Three-Day Week
- Working time
- Weekend
