= 8/5 =

8/5 may refer to:

- August 5 (month-day date notation)
- May 8 (day-month date notation)
- Hours of work covered at Working time#Workweek structure
