= Chemicals Convention =

International Labour Organization Convention

Chemicals Convention, 1990
C170
- ILO Convention
- Date of adoption: June 25, 1990
- Date in force: November 4, 1993
- Classification: Toxic Substances and Agents
- Subject: Occupational Safety and Health
- Previous: Indigenous and Tribal Peoples Convention, 1989
- Next: Night Work Convention, 1990

Chemicals Convention, 1990 is an International Labour Organization Convention.

== Content ==
The convention was held on the 77th session of the International Labour Convention in Geneva on 6 June 1990. The convention states the importance of protection of the environment, general public and all workers from chemicals. It notes the relevance of Employment Injury Benefits Convention, 1964, the Benzene Convention and Recommendation, 1971, the Occupational Cancer Convention and Recommendation 1974, Working Environment (Air Pollution, Noise and Vibration) Convention, 1977, the list of occupational diseases amended in 1980, the Occupational Safety and Health Convention and Recommendation, 1981, the Occupational Health Services Convention and Recommendation, 1985 and the Asbestos Convention and Recommendation 1986. Workers have to be informed about the used chemicals and the possibility of illness and injuries at work must be reduced.

=== Scope and definitions ===
The first two articles deal with the definitions of the different terms to be used in this convention and the areas of application or the scopes of application.

==== Article 1 ====
This convention applies to all branches of economy, in which chemicals are used. After an assessment of the hazards involved and protective measures to be applied, an organization may be exempted by the competent authority of a member if special problems are encountered, sufficient protection is provided, or precautions taken to protect confidential information do not compromise the safety of workers. This convention does not apply to articles which do not expose workers to hazardous chemicals. It does not apply to organisms, but shall apply to chemicals derived from organisms.

==== Article 2 ====
The term chemicals are defined as natural or synthetic elements and compound for this convention.
The term hazardous chemical means any chemical classified as hazardous under Article 6 or for which information exist indicating that it is hazardous.
The term us of chemicals at work implies any activity that may expose workers to a chemical during production, handling, storage and transport of chemicals. Furthermore, the term includes the treatment of waste chemicals, release of chemical results and the maintenance, repair and cleaning of equipment and containers for chemicals.
Branches of economic activity means all branches including public services.
The term article implies an object that has a specific shape or pattern when manufactured or that is in natural form and whose use depends in whole or in part on its shape or pattern.
Workers’ representatives are persons who are recognized by national law or practice in accordance with the Workers' Representatives Convention, 1971.

=== General provisions ===
==== Article 3 ====
The most representative organizations of the employers and employees concerned must be consulted on the measures for implementation.

==== Article 4 ====
Each member shall formulate, implement and periodically review a coherent policy for safety in the use of chemicals in the workplace.

==== Article 5 ====
The competent authority is allowed to prohibit the use of certain hazardous chemicals on the grounds of safety or to require prior approval for the use.

=== Classification and related measures ===
Articles six to nine deal with the classification of all chemicals, supply, safety precautions and the recommendations of the United Nations. The measures are recorded on adapted safety data sheets.

==== Article 6 ====
The competent authority or a body approved or recognized by the competent authority shall establish systems for the classification of all chemicals.
The hazardous properties of mixtures may be determined on the basis of the hazardousness of the individual components.
The United Nations Recommendation may be taken into account in the transport of dangerous goods.
The classification systems and their application are gradually being expanded.

==== Article 7 ====
All chemicals shall be labeled. Dangerous chemicals shall be specially marked. These markings shall be made by the competent authority itself or the competent authority shall permit the marking. When transporting dangerous goods, the recommendations of the United Nations must be taken into account.

==== Article 8 ====
Employers must be provided with data sheets containing information on hazards, suppliers, safety precautions and emergency procedures for hazardous chemicals.
The data sheets are subject to criteria set by the competent authority or recognized bodies under Criteria.
The name used on the data sheets must match the name on the label.

==== Article 9 ====
All suppliers of chemicals shall ensure that the chemicals are classified in accordance with Article 6, labeled in accordance with Article 7, and safety data sheets are provided in accordance with Article 8.
As new health and safety information on chemicals becomes available, the supplier of hazardous chemicals shall ensure that new labels and safety data sheets are handed over in accordance with national legislation.
Suppliers of chemicals not yet classified under Article 6 shall seek available information on the chemical to evaluate whether it is hazardous.

=== Responsibilities of employers ===
Articles 10 to 16 deal with the duty of employers to inform workers about possible risks associated with the use of chemicals in the workplace. Employers and employees must work together to ensure safety.

==== Article 10 ====
Employers must ensure that all chemicals are labeled in accordance with Article 7 and that chemical data sheets are made available to workers and their representatives in accordance with Article 8.
If employers receive chemicals that are not labeled in accordance with Article 7 or for which safety data sheets are not provided in accordance with Article 8, they shall obtain information from the supplier or other reasonably available sources. Until then, the chemicals should not be used.
The employer shall ensure that chemicals used have been classified in accordance with Article 6, identified in accordance with Article 9, labeled in accordance with Article 7 and that all necessary precautions have been taken.
Employers must maintain a register of all hazardous chemicals used in the workplace, with cross-references to their chemical safety data sheets, and make it available to all workers.

==== Article 11 ====
The employer must provide workers with sufficient information about safety precautions and identity of chemicals when the chemical is transferred.

==== Article 12 ====
Employers must ensure that workers are not exposed to hazardous chemicals for longer than permitted, must assess worker exposure to hazardous chemicals, must monitor and record work with hazardous chemicals to protect safety and health, and must ensure that records are properly maintained.

==== Article 13 ====
The employer shall make an assessment of the risks resulting from the use of chemicals at work and shall protect workers by taking appropriate measures.
Employers must limit employee exposure to chemicals to protect health and safety, provide first aid and make provisions for emergencies.

==== Article 14 ====
Hazardous chemicals and emptied containers containing residues of hazardous chemicals shall be disposed of in a manner that reduces the risk to safety, health and the environment.

==== Article 15 ====
Employers must inform workers of the hazards they face in their workplace and of chemical labels and safety data sheets.
They must use the safety data sheets as the basis for work instructions and provide ongoing training to workers on chemical use.

==== Article 16 ====
Employers and employees shall work together in relation to safety in the use of chemicals in the workplace.

=== Duties of workers ===
Article 17 is about the cooperation between employers and employees to reduce risks at work.

==== Article 17 ====
Workers shall work closely with employers and follow all procedures in the use of chemicals at work to ensure safety.
Workers shall take all reasonable steps to minimize the risk associated with the handling of chemicals.

=== Rights of workers and their representatives ===
Article 18 gives employees the right to avoid imminent risk for health reasons without unreasonable consequences.

==== Article 18 ====
Employees have the right to remove themselves from the hazards of working with chemicals if there is an immediate risk to their health or safety.
Employees who extricate themselves from danger in accordance with the provisions of this Article shall be protected from unreasonable consequences.
Affected workers have the right to information about the properties and identity, labels, and safety data sheets of the chemicals used.
If disclosure of an identity of a chemical to a competitor may harm the employer's business, the employer, when providing the information required under this Article, may protect the identity in accordance with Article 1.

=== Responsibility of exporting States ===
Articles 19 to 27 deal with the responsibilities for States exporting hazardous chemicals and the responsibilities for control. They also address the validity of this Convention and the scope of application.

==== Article 19 ====
When an exporting member State prohibits the use of certain or all hazardous chemicals for reasons of safety and health at work, the fact and the reasons for it shall be communicated to all importing countries.

==== Article 20 ====
The ratifications of this convention must be communicated to the Director-General of the International Labour Office for registration.

==== Article 21 ====
This convention shall be binding only upon members whose ratifications have been registered with the Director-General.
It enters into force twelve months after the date on which the ratifications have been registered with the Director-General of the first two members.
Thereafter, the convention shall enter into force for each additional member twelve months after the date of its ratification.

==== Article 22 ====
A ratified member may denounce ten years after the entry into force of the convention by an act addressed to the Director-General. The denunciation shall take effect one year after the date of registration.
Any ratified member which does not exercise the right of denunciation within the said ten-year period may denounce only after the expiration of a further ten years under the mentioned conditions.

==== Article 23 ====
The Director-General shall note all ratifications and denunciations by all notified members.
When notifying members of the second ratification, the Director General shall indicate the date on which the convention shall enter into force.

==== Article 24 ====
The Director-General of the ILO shall transmit to the Secretary-General of the UN for registration under Article 102 of the Charter of the United Nations the particulars of all ratifications and denunciations.

==== Article 25 ====
The Governing Body of the ILO shall, at such times as it may determine, submit a report on the implementation of this convention and shall consider the need for its revision.

==== Article 26 ====
If the conference adopts a new convention which revises this convention, ratification of the new convention shall, without prejudice to Article 22, result in the immediate denunciation of this convention.
On the date on which the new convention enters into force, this convention shall cease to be in force.
This convention shall in any case remain in force in its present form for those members which have ratified it but have not ratified the revision convention.

==== Article 27 ====
The English and French versions of the text of this Convention are equally authoritative.

== Ratifications ==
As of April 2024, the convention has been ratified by 24 states.

Belgium	14 Jun 2017	In Force
Brazil	23 Dec 1996	In Force
Burkina Faso	15 Sep 1997	In Force
China	11 Jan 1995	In Force
Colombia	06 Sep 1994	In Force
Cyprus	02 Aug 2016	In Force
Côte d'Ivoire	01 Nov 2019	In Force
Dominican Republic	03 Jan 2006	In Force
Finland	21 Jan 2014	In Force
Germany	23 Nov 2007	In Force
Italy	03 Jul 2002	In Force
Lebanon	26 Apr 2006	In Force
Luxembourg	08 Apr 2008	In Force
Mexico	17 Sep 1992	In Force
Netherlands	08 Jun 2017	In Force
Norway	26 Nov 1993	In Force
Poland	19 May 2005	In Force
Republic of Korea	11 Apr 2003	In Force
Sweden	04 Nov 1992	In Force
Switzerland	25 Apr 2022	In Force
Syrian Arab Republic	14 Jun 2006	In Force
Ukraine	06 Dec 2023	In Force
United Republic of Tanzania	15 Mar 1999	In Force
Zimbabwe	27 Aug 1998	In Force
