= Indigenous and Tribal Peoples Convention, 1989 =

C169
- ILO Convention
- Date of adoption: June 27, 1989
- Date in force: September 5, 1991
- Classification: Indigenous and Tribal Peoples
- Subject: Indigenous and Tribal Peoples
- Previous: Employment Promotion and Protection against Unemployment Convention, 1988
- Next: Chemicals Convention, 1990

The Indigenous and Tribal Peoples Convention, 1989 is an International Labour Organization Convention, also known as ILO Convention 169, or C169. It is the major binding international convention concerning Indigenous peoples and tribal peoples, and a forerunner of the Declaration on the Rights of Indigenous Peoples.

It was established in 1989, with the preamble stating:

Noting the international standards contained in the Indigenous and Tribal Populations Convention and Recommendation, 1957, and

Recalling the terms of the Universal Declaration of Human Rights, the International Covenant on Economic, Social and Cultural Rights, the International Covenant on Civil and Political Rights, and the many international instruments on the prevention of discrimination, and

Considering that the developments which have taken place in international law since 1957, as well as developments in the situation of indigenous and tribal peoples in all regions of the world, have made it appropriate to adopt new international standards on the subject with a view to removing the assimilationist orientation of the earlier standards, and

Recognising the aspirations of these peoples to exercise control over their own institutions, ways of life and economic development and to maintain and develop their identities, languages and religions, within the framework of the States in which they live, and

Noting that in many parts of the world these peoples are unable to enjoy their fundamental human rights to the same degree as the rest of the population of the States within which they live, and that their laws, values, customs and perspectives have often been eroded, and...

== Provisions ==
The convention contains forty-four articles, divided in ten parts. These are:

- Part I. General Policy
- Part II. Land
- Part III. Recruitment And Conditions Of Employment
- Part IV. Vocational Training, Handicrafts And Rural Industries
- Part V. Social Security And Health
- Part VI. Education And Means Of Communication
- Part VII. Contacts And Co-operation Across Borders
- Part VIII. Administration
- Part IX. General Provisions
- Part X. Final Provisions

== Modification ==
This convention revised Convention C107, the Indigenous and Tribal Populations Convention, 1957. Some of the nations ratifying the 1989 Convention "denounced" the 1957 Convention.

== Purpose and history ==
The ILO 169 convention is the most important operative international law guaranteeing the rights of Indigenous and tribal peoples. Its strength, however, is dependent on a high number of ratifications among nations.

The revision to the Convention 107 forbade governments from pursuing approaches deemed integrationist and assimilationist. It asserts the rights of Indigenous and tribal peoples to choose to integrate or to maintain their cultural and political independence. Articles 8–10 recognize the cultures, traditions, and special circumstances of Indigenous tribal peoples.

In November 2009, a court decision in Chile, considered to be a landmark in Indigenous rights concerns, made use of the ILO convention law. The court ruled unanimously in favor of granting a water flow of 9 liters per second to Chusmiza and Usmagama communities. The legal dispute had dragged on for 14 years, and centers on community water rights in one of the driest deserts on the planet. The Supreme Court decision on Aymara water rights upholds rulings by both the Pozo Almonte tribunal and the Iquique Court of Appeals, and marks the first judicial application of ILO Convention 169 in Chile. Before this decision, some protests had escalated over the failure to respect the Convention 169 in Chile. Mapuche leaders filed an injunction against Michelle Bachelet and minister of the presidency José Antonio Viera Gallo, who is also coordinator of Indigenous affairs, with the argument that the government had failed to fully comply with the Convention 169 clause on the right to "prior consultation", which must be carried out "in good faith and in a form appropriate to the circumstances, with the objective of achieving agreement or consent to the proposed measures," such as logging, agribusiness or mining projects in Indigenous territories. There were already several examples of the successful use of the ILO Convention in Chile, like the case of a Machi woman who brought legal action to protect a plot of land with herbs used for medicinal purposes, which was threatened by the forest industry. Some concerns were however raised at the time over the political framework of the government being brought in line with the convention, and not the other way around.

== Ratifications ==
Countries that ratified the convention

Ratifications of Convention 169:
Country	Date	Notes
Argentina	3 July 2000	ratified
Bolivia	11 December 1991	ratified
Brazil	25 July 2002	ratified
Central African Republic	30 August 2010	ratified
Chile	15 September 2008	ratified
Colombia	7 August 1991	ratified
Costa Rica	2 April 1993	ratified
Denmark	22 February 1996	ratified
Dominica	25 June 2002	ratified
Ecuador	15 May 1998	ratified
Fiji	3 March 1998	ratified
Germany	15 April 2021	ratified
Guatemala	5 June 1996	ratified
Honduras	28 March 1995	ratified
Luxembourg	5 June 2018	ratified
Mexico	5 September 1990	ratified
Nepal	14 September 2007	ratified
Netherlands	2 February 1998	ratified
Nicaragua	25 August 2010	ratified
Norway	19 June 1990	ratified
Paraguay	10 August 1993	ratified
Peru	2 February 1994	ratified
Spain	15 February 2007	ratified
Venezuela	22 May 2002	ratified
