= Workmen's Compensation (Agriculture) Convention, 1921 =

International Labour Organization Convention

C12
- ILO Convention
- Date of adoption: November 12, 1921
- Date in force: February 26, 1923
- Classification: Employment Injury Benefit
- Subject: Social Security
- Previous: Right of Association (Agriculture) Convention, 1921
- Next: White Lead (Painting) Convention, 1921

Workmen's Compensation (Agriculture) Convention, 1921 is an International Labour Organization Convention.

It was established in 1921:

Having decided upon the adoption of certain proposals with regard to the protection of agricultural workers against accident, ...

== Modification ==
The principles contained in the convention were subsequently revised and included in ILO Convention C121, Employment Injury Benefits Convention, 1964.

== Ratifications ==
As of 2013, the convention has been ratified by 77 states. It has subsequently been denounced by one of these states, Uruguay.
