= Weekly Rest (Industry) Convention, 1921 =

International Labour Organization Convention

C14
- ILO Convention
- Date of adoption: November 17, 1921
- Date in force: June 19, 1923
- Classification: Weekly Rest
- Subject: Working Time
- Previous: White Lead (Painting) Convention, 1921
- Next: Minimum Age (Trimmers and Stokers) Convention, 1921 (shelved)

Weekly Rest (Industry) Convention, 1921 is an International Labour Organization Convention on limitation of working time to eight-hour day and 48 hours for a week.

It was established in 1921:

Having decided upon the adoption of certain proposals with regard to the weekly rest day in industrial employment,...

== Ratifications ==
As of April 2021, the convention has been ratified by 120 states.

== See also ==
- Weekly Rest (Commerce and Offices) Convention, 1957
