= Indigenous and Tribal Populations Convention, 1957 =

International Labour Organization Convention

C107
- ILO Convention
- Date of adoption: June 26, 1957
- Date in force: June 2, 1959
- Classification: Indigenous and Tribal Peoples
- Subject: Indigenous and Tribal Peoples
- Previous: Weekly Rest (Commerce and Offices) Convention, 1957
- Next: Seafarers' Identity Documents Convention, 1958

A shaman man from the Amazon rainforest, wearing traditional dress. Brazil is a signatory to the Indigenous and Tribal Populations Convention.

Indigenous and Tribal Populations Convention, 1957 is an International Labour Organization Convention within the United Nations that was established in 1957. Its primary focus is to recognize and protect the cultural, religious, civil and social rights of indigenous and tribal populations within an independent country, and to provide a standard framework for addressing the economic issues that many of these groups face.

Today this Convention, C107, is considered outdated in the protection of indigenous rights by the ILO organization. In 1989, the Indigenous and Tribal Peoples Convention, 1989 (C169) was written with the purpose of revising it. The new convention has been ratified by twenty countries, including some that denounced the 1957 convention. In the body of the more recent convention, we read, "[...] Considering that the developments which have taken place in international law since 1957, as well as developments in the situation of indigenous and tribal peoples in all regions of the world, have made it appropriate to adopt new international standards on the subject with a view to removing the assimilationist orientation of the earlier standards [...]".

== Preamble ==
Having decided upon the adoption of certain proposals with regard to the protection and integration of indigenous and other tribal and semi-tribal populations in independent countries,... considering that... all human beings have the right to pursue both their material well-being and their spiritual development in conditions of freedom and dignity... and... considering that there exist in various independent countries indigenous and other tribal and semi-tribal populations which are not yet integrated into the national community and... (are not yet) benefiting fully from the rights and advantages enjoyed by other elements of the population, and...considering it desirable both for humanitarian reasons and in the interest of the countries concerned to promote continued action to improve the living and working conditions of these populations by simultaneous action in respect of all the factors which have hitherto prevented them from sharing fully in the progress of the national community of which they form part, and...noting that these standards [of this convention] have been framed with the co-operation of the United Nations, the Food and Agriculture Organization of the United Nations, the United Nations Educational, Scientific and Cultural Organization and the World Health Organization, at appropriate levels and in their respective fields, and that it is proposed to seek their continuing co-operation in promoting and securing the application of these standards...

– Selected excerpts from the preamble of the declaration

== Provisions ==
=== PART I. General policy ===
==== Article 1 ====
The convention applies to members of a tribal population whose social and economic conditions are at a less advanced stage than other sections of the nation state and have their own customs and traditions. These tribal populations are people who are regarded as indigenous as they are the descendants of the original inhabitants of the region "...at the time of conquest, or colonization..." and who live more in common with their historical traditions and tribal institutions, than with the institutions of the nation state to which they belong. "Self-identification as indigenous ..." is the criteria to which this convention would apply.

==== Article 2 ====
The convention requires that the nation state work with indigenous groups to create a legal framework for protecting the legal rights of the indigenous groups. These actions include ensuring that the indigenous individuals have the same rights as the non-indigenous, and to recognize and help preserve the traditions and cultural identity of the indigenous groups. Further actions include helping to remove economic gaps between the indigenous and other members of the nation state.

==== Article 3 ====
The convention maintains that indigenous and tribal peoples shall enjoy human rights and freedoms without discrimination, including gender discrimination.

==== Article 4 ====
The nation state will adopt protections for the "...safeguarding the persons, institutions, property, labour, cultures and environment of the peoples concerned." These measures are not to be in conflict with the wishes of the people concerned, and such safeguards will not be at the expense of the general rights of citizenship of the indigenous peoples.

==== Articles 5-10 ====
These articles support articles 1–4, giving methods for carrying out the general policy of the convention.

=== PART II. Land ===
==== Article 11 ====
The indigenous and tribal populations shall have right of ownership over lands that they populations have traditionally occupied.

==== Article 12 ====
1. The indigenous and tribal populations shall not be removed without their free consent from their historical territories except regarding national laws, national security issues, national economic development, or for the health of the indigenous populations.

2. If removal of these populations is absolutely necessary, they shall be given lands of equal quality to the lands previously occupied by them, suitable to provide for their present needs and future development.

3. Persons thus removed shall be fully compensated for any resulting loss or injury.

==== Article 13 ====
1. Traditional customs of the transfer of land ownership rights shall be respected by the nation state "...within the framework of national laws and regulations... and do not hinder their economic and social development."

2. "Arrangements shall be made to prevent persons who are not members of the populations concerned from taking advantage of these customs or of lack of understanding of the laws on the part of the members of these populations to secure the ownership or use of the lands belonging to such members".

==== Article 14 ====
National state farm programs shall provide the necessary land needed for the indigiouns groups to provide "...the essentials of a normal existence", and "...promote the development of the lands which these populations already possess."

=== PART III. Recruitment and conditions of employment ===
==== Article 15 ====
This clause deals with the rights of access to full and occupationally safe employment, without fear of discrimination, and under the same conditions as of the rest of the population, and provides for the right to join legal trade unions, with access to "medical and social assistance..." and adequate housing.

=== PART IV. Vocational training, handicrafts and rural industries ===
==== Article 16-17 ====
"Persons belonging to the populations concerned shall enjoy the same opportunities as other citizens in respect of vocational training facilities." If there are no vocational training programs in place for this population, the government will provide them. After a careful study of the economic environment and the "...stage of cultural development" and practical needs of the indigenous population, the government shall provide vocational training programs for them. These special training facilities shall be provided for "...only so long as the stage of cultural development of the populations concerned requires them," until they are replaced by the facilities provided for other citizens.

==== Article 18 ====
1. Handicrafts and rural industries shall be encouraged for economic development in a manner which will enable these populations to raise their standard of living, "...in a manner which preserves the cultural heritage of these populations and improves their artistic values and particular modes of cultural expression."

=== PART V. Social security and health ===
==== Article 19-20 ====
Government social security programs shall be extended to all wage earners and other persons belonging to these populations. Governments will provide adequate health services for the populations concerned, based on studies of their social, economic and cultural conditions.

=== PART VI. Education and means of communication ===
==== Article 21-22 ====
Equal educational opportunities shall be available to the populations concerned at the same levels as other national citizens. Such education programs for shall be adapted "...to the stage these populations have reached in the process of social, economic and cultural integration into the national community," and such programs shall "...be preceded by ethnological surveys."

==== Article 23 ====
"Children belonging to the populations concerned shall be taught to read and write in their mother tongue or, where this is not practicable, in the language most commonly used by the group to which they belong." "Provision shall be made for a progressive transition from the mother tongue or the vernacular language to the national language or to one of the official languages of the country." "Appropriate measures shall, as far as possible, be taken to preserve the mother tongue or the vernacular language."

==== Article 24-25 ====
The national state will educate the children of the populations concerned to "... become integrated in the national community..." The national state will undertake educational measures for the national community "...eliminating prejudices that they may harbour in respect of these populations."

==== Article 26 ====
The nation state "...shall adopt measures, appropriate to the social and cultural characteristics of the populations concerned, to make known to them their rights and duties, especially in regard to labour and social welfare," and, if necessary, translate such information "...by means of written translations and through the use of media of mass communication in the languages of these populations."

=== PART VII. Administration ===
==== Article 27 ====
This article contains support language that gives the national state the legal, administrative responsibility to create agencies to carry out the above programs.

=== PART VIII. General provisions ===
==== Article 28-31 ====
These clauses contain support language describing the UN's understanding that each nation state's situation is going to be different, that this convention will not conflict with the benefits of other conventions, and would only be considered binding if accepted by the Director-General of the International Labour Office. This convention would come into effect after two nation states have ratified the agreement, and twelve months after the date of its registration.

==== Article 32 ====
The nation state may withdraw from the convention (described as "denounce") ten years after the date the convention comes into force, and must be filed within a one-year period of that anniversary. If the state does not announce its denunciation from the convention within one year of the anniversary date, ten years must pass before another denunciation can be announced.

==== Article 33-36 ====
These articles contain support language that describes to whom and how the Director-General of the International Labour Office of the United Nations should register the country's admission of the convention.

==== Article 37 ====
"The English and French versions of the text of this Convention are equally authoritative."

== Modifications ==
This Convention was subsequently revised in 1989 by Convention C169 Indigenous and Tribal Peoples Convention, 1989.

== Ratifications ==
The following countries have ratified this convention:
Country	Date	Notes
Angola	June 4, 1976	ratified
Argentina	January 18, 1960	denounced on July 3, 2000
Bangladesh	June 22, 1972	ratified
Belgium	November 19, 1958	ratified
Bolivia	January 12, 1965	denounced on December 11, 1991
Brazil	June 18, 1965	denounced on July 25, 2002
Colombia	March 4, 1969	denounced on August 7, 1991
Costa Rica	May 4, 1959	denounced on April 2, 1993
Cuba	June 2, 1958	ratified
Dominican Republic	June 23, 1958	ratified
Ecuador	October 3, 1969	denounced on May 15, 1998
Egypt	January 14, 1959	ratified as the United Arab Republic
El Salvador	November 18, 1958	ratified
Ghana	December 15, 1958	ratified
Guinea-Bissau	February 21, 1977	ratified
Haiti	March 4, 1958	ratified
India	September 29, 1958	ratified
Iraq	July 16, 1986	ratified
Malawi	March 22, 1965	ratified
Mexico	June 1, 1959	denounced on September 5, 1990
Pakistan	February 15, 1960	ratified
Panama	June 4, 1971	ratified
Paraguay	February 20, 1969	denounced on August 10, 1993
Peru	December 6, 1960	denounced on February 2, 1994
Portugal	November 22, 1960	ratified
Syrian Arab Republic	January 14, 1959	ratified as the United Arab Republic
Tunisia	December 17, 1962	ratified

=== Reasons for denunciation of convention ===
All countries that declared that they "denounced" the convention did this as a result of the subsequent ratification of the Indigenous and Tribal Peoples Convention, 1989 (No. 169). Those parties that remain "ratified" were not signatories to the later convention.
