= White Lead (Painting) Convention, 1921 =

International Labour Organization Convention

C13
- ILO Convention
- Date of adoption: November 19, 1921
- Date in force: August 31, 1923
- Classification: Toxic Substances and Agents
- Subject: Occupational Safety and Health
- Previous: Workmen's Compensation (Agriculture) Convention, 1921
- Next: Weekly Rest (Industry) Convention, 1921

White Lead (Painting) Convention, 1921 is an International Labour Organization Convention established in 1921 to advance the prohibition of using white lead in paint.

As of 2017 many leading nations with large lead mining, refining, or manufacturing industries, including the United States, the United Kingdom, Germany, Japan, China and India, remain outside the organization.

== Ratifications ==
As of 2013, the convention has been ratified by 63 states:

Country	Date	Notes
Afghanistan	12.6.1939	
Algeria	19.10.1962	
Argentina	26.5.1936	
Austria	12.6.1924	
Azerbaijan	19.5.1992	
Belgium	19.7.1926	
Benin	12.12.1960	
Bosnia and Herzegovina	2.6.1993	
Bulgaria	6.3.1925	
Burkina Faso	21.11.1960	
Cambodia	24.2.1969	
Cameroon	7.6.1960	
Central African Republic	27.10.1960	
Chad	10.11.1960	
Chile	15.9.1925	
Colombia	20.6.1933	
Comoros	23.10.1978	
Congo	10.11.1960	
Côte d'Ivoire	21.11.1960	
Croatia	8.10.1991	
Cuba	7.7.1928	
Czech Republic	1.1.1993	
Djibouti	3.8.1978	
Estonia	8.9.1922	
Finland	5.4.1929	
France	19.2.1926	
Gabon	14.10.1960	
Greece	22.12.1926	
Guatemala	5.1.1990	
Guinea	21.1.1959	
Hungary	8.6.1956	
Iraq	19.4.1966	
Italy	22.10.1952	
Lao People's Democratic Republic	23.1.1964	
Latvia	9.9.1924	
Luxembourg	16.4.1928	
Madagascar	1.11.1960	
Mali	22.9.1960	
Malta	9.6.1988	
Mauritania	20.6.1961	
Mexico	7.1.1938	
Montenegro	3.6.2006	
Morocco	13.6.1956	
Netherlands	15.12.1939	
Nicaragua	12.4.1934	
Niger	27.2.1961	
Norway	11.6.1929	
Panama	19.6.1970	
Poland	21.6.1924	
Romania	4.12.1925	
Russian Federation	10.10.1991	ratified as the Soviet Union
Senegal	4.11.1960	
Serbia	24.11.2000	ratified as the Federal Republic of Yugoslavia
Slovakia	1.1.1993	
Slovenia	29.5.1992	
Spain	20.6.1924	
Suriname	15.6.1976	
Sweden	27.11.1923	
The Republic of Macedonia	17.11.1991	
Togo	7.6.1960	
Tunisia	12.6.1956	
Uruguay	6.6.1933	
Bolivarian Republic of Venezuela	28.4.1933	
