= Weekly Rest (Commerce and Offices) Convention, 1957 =

International Labour Organization Convention

C106
- ILO Convention
- Date of adoption: June 26, 1957
- Date in force: March 4, 1959
- Classification: Weekly Rest
- Subject: Working Time
- Previous: Abolition of Forced Labour Convention, 1957
- Next: Indigenous and Tribal Populations Convention, 1957

Weekly Rest (Commerce and Offices) Convention, 1957 is an International Labour Organization Convention.

It was established in 1957, with the preamble stating:

Having decided upon the adoption of certain proposals with regard to weekly rest in commerce and offices, ...

== Ratifications ==
As of 2017, the convention has been ratified by 63 states.

== See also ==
- Weekly Rest (Industry) Convention, 1921
