= Business day =

Official working days within the week

A business day normally means any day except a legal holiday. It may also mean a business day of operation, any of the days an organization operates. It depends on the local workweek which is dictated by local customs, religions, and business operations. It is related to working time, the period of time that an individual spends at paid occupational labor.

Alternatively, a business day may also be defined any day except those on which banking institutions are authorized or required by law or other governmental action to close.

== Working time ==
The working time in a business day varies by region. For example, in the United States and much of the Western world, a normal business day is from 9 am to 5 pm. In contrast, for many eastern countries such as Japan, the normal business day is from 8:30 am to 7 pm.

The length of a business day varies by era, by region, by industry, and by company. Prevalent norms have included the 8-hour day and the 10-hour day, but various lengths, from 4 to 16 hours, have been normal in certain times and places.

== United States ==
In the United States, a business day is distinct from weekdays, weekends, and the standard workweek. A business day means all calendar days except the federal legal holidays listed in 5 U.S.C. § 6103(a) unless otherwise defined.

At times, government agencies and businesses may define business days as "day in which offices are open" separate from the basic legal definition. For example, in the state of Georgia for purposes of consumer protection, the state clarifies that a business day, unless otherwise defined, corresponds to "business days of operation", meaning that a business open daily would be considered to have seven business days a week. For purposes of lending, the business week is six days from Monday to Saturday.

Similarly, the United States Postal Service (USPS) delivers mail on Saturdays. Saturdays are included when counting business days to determine the arrival date of a package in shipping estimates. If USPS receives a parcel on a Thursday that will be delivered in "two business days", it will arrive on the following Saturday if neither Friday nor Saturday are holidays.

In finance, business days are defined by "business day conventions", which determines how payments are settled on contracts such as interest rate swaps.

== German-speaking countries ==
In Germany, Austria and Switzerland, two German words of somewhat different meaning are used to describe business or working days. One is Werktag, a legal term applied to all calendar days except Sundays and public holidays; it includes most Saturdays. Werktage are days on which businesses such as retail shops and institutions such as schools are generally allowed to operate (see also Ladenschlussgesetz). In contrast, Arbeitstag refers to a day on which someone actually works. For most employees, these are Monday to Friday. However, for example, a firefighter might have an Arbeitstag on Sunday even though it is legally not a Werktag.

== Shifts and trends ==
The introduction of flex time introduces the internet as a more easily globalized and offshored workforce. The notion of a business day has come under a certain degree of challenge. Information-based companies with a limited dependence on physical goods have less of a need to distinguish a weekend day from a weekday. Indeed, to many, there is no difference at all. These companies construe a business day to be any day on which they provide service.

Some businesses conduct business transactions and operations on a 24/7 basis due to the nature of the field. Such businesses include hotels, hospitals, police and fire departments, gas stations, and airports.

With the introduction of flex time, the significance of the traditional business day is declining. Although the 8-hour work day still remains as a standard for many industries, this trend is expected to decline further during the coming years.

== See also ==
- Calendar day
- Day count convention
- Workweek and weekend
