= Shopping hours =

Time during which shops are open

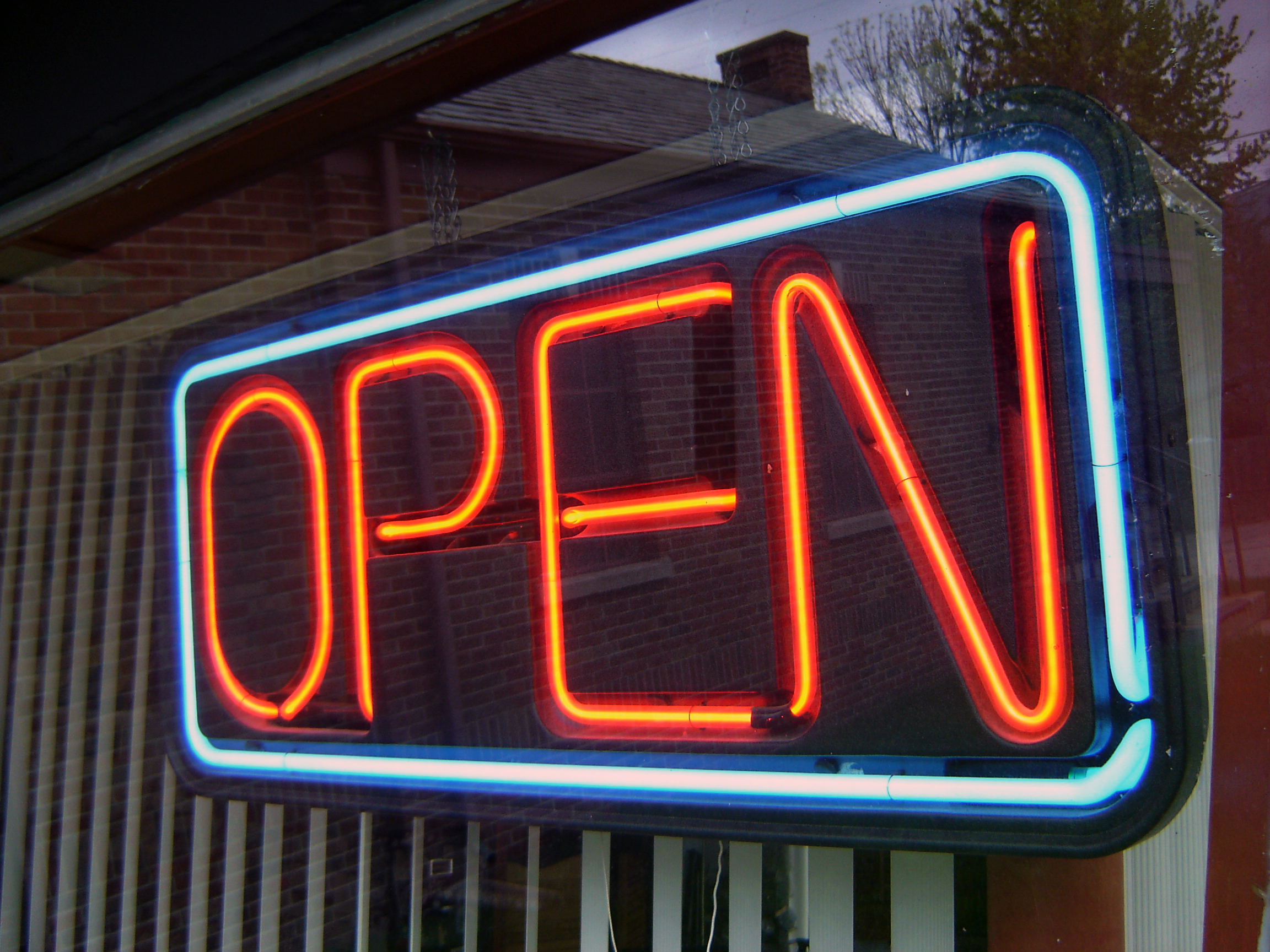
A store displays a neon "OPEN" sign indicating it's open for business—a ubiquitous sight in U.S. storefronts.

Customs and regulations for shopping hours (times that shops are open) vary between countries and between cities.

== Shopping days and impact of holidays ==
Some countries, particularly those with predominantly Christian populations or histories, do not allow Sunday shopping. In Islamic countries, some shops are closed on Fridays for noontime prayers. In Israel many shops are closed on Friday evenings and Saturdays during the daytime for Shabbat (the Jewish Sabbath).

Each state in Australia sets its own standard trading hours, but in most of the country the shops are open seven days a week for at least part of the day. These also depends on their day-to-day needs.

For some shops and other businesses in culturally Christian countries, Christmas Day is the only day in the year that they are closed.

In the United States and Canada, nearly all retail stores are open every day of the year except for Thanksgiving, Christmas Day, and Easter Sunday. Some suburban and smaller communities often close on Sundays. For example, Bergen County, New Jersey, next to New York City, completely bans Sunday shopping. Nearly all stores in the United States have restricted hours on Sundays (most often 11 am or noon to 5 - 7 pm), and stores close early on important holidays, such as Christmas Eve, New Year's Eve, New Year's Day, and Independence Day. Banks, post offices and other government offices either are closed on weekends, or close early on Saturdays. Many other non-retail establishments remain closed on weekends.

In Islamic countries shops may have special opening hours during Ramadan.

In Israel, many shops are closed on religious holidays other than Shabbat, especially on Yom Kippur when nearly all businesses are closed.

== By country ==
=== Australia ===
Shop trading hours in Australia are regulated by individual states and territories.

The Australian Capital Territory, the Northern Territory and the states of New South Wales, Victoria and Tasmania, totally or almost totally deregulate shopping hours. All retail businesses in the two territories, regardless of size or product offer, are allowed to decide their trading hours to suit their individual customer demand. Non-essential shops in the three states are required to remain closed on Christmas Day and Good Friday, ANZAC Day (until 1 pm), and in Tasmania and NSW on Easter Sunday, and in NSW on Boxing Day (outside the Sydney special trading precinct). Shops in the Northern Territory and the Australian Capital Territory can remain open on any public holiday. The two main supermarket operators, Woolworths and Coles, generally trade between 6 am and midnight every day, although some inner-city shops in Sydney and Melbourne operate twenty-four hours. In Canberra, stores such as Woolworths Kmart and Coles were open 24/7; however during the Covid-19 pandemic store closures, these stores did not reopen with 24/7 shopping hours.

Melbourne generally has the most relaxed rules. Almost all shopping centres in Melbourne now trade until 9 pm on Thursdays and Fridays as well as being open longer hours on Sundays. Interstate late night trading only occurs on either Thursday or Friday rather than both.

Melbourne is also famous for beginning the trend of 36-hour overnight trades in the lead-up to Christmas. Some of the larger shopping centres will open from 8 am December 23 until 6 pm on Christmas Eve. Centres often open to 10 pm or midnight on most other nights in the fortnight before Christmas, and the first few days of the annual Boxing Day Sales.

Trading hours in the Australian Capital Territory have been deregulated since the repeal of the Trading Hours Act 1996 [ACT] on 29 May 1997.

Shopping hours in South Australia are still regulated, but there have been numerous changes to relax the laws. Nonetheless, trading laws are still face complicated and confusing: legal trading hours vary depending on size and product offer. Supermarkets that trade with fewer than seven workers and with a trading floor less than 500 m^{2} are exempt from the laws. Larger supermarkets are required by law to close at 9 pm on Mondays to Fridays, and 5 pm on Saturdays; they are permitted to trade on Sundays and public holidays only from 9 am to 5 pm, except ANZAC Day, which is 12 noon to 5 pm; they must remain closed on Good Friday, Easter Sunday and Christmas Day.

In all areas of Queensland, trading hours of major supermarkets are Monday to Saturday from 7 am to 9 pm and Sundays and public holidays from 9 am to 6 pm. Most major shopping centres close at 5 pm every day, except for "late night shopping" on one night a week. Supermarkets in major shopping centres must still cease trading at 9 pm, with special access for just the supermarket.

In rural areas of Western Australia below the 27th parallel, local governments nominate shop closing hours to the State government, which, if accepted, are implemented by ministerial order. Shopping hours in the state's capital, Perth, are regulated by laws similar to South Australia's. Trading hours are stipulated in law, and are based on size and product offer. As in South Australia, smaller, independently operated supermarket retailers are exempted. Chain supermarkets are required to close Monday to Friday at 9 pm, Saturdays at 5 pm, and are permitted to trade on Sundays and public holidays only from 11 am to 5 pm.

=== Austria ===
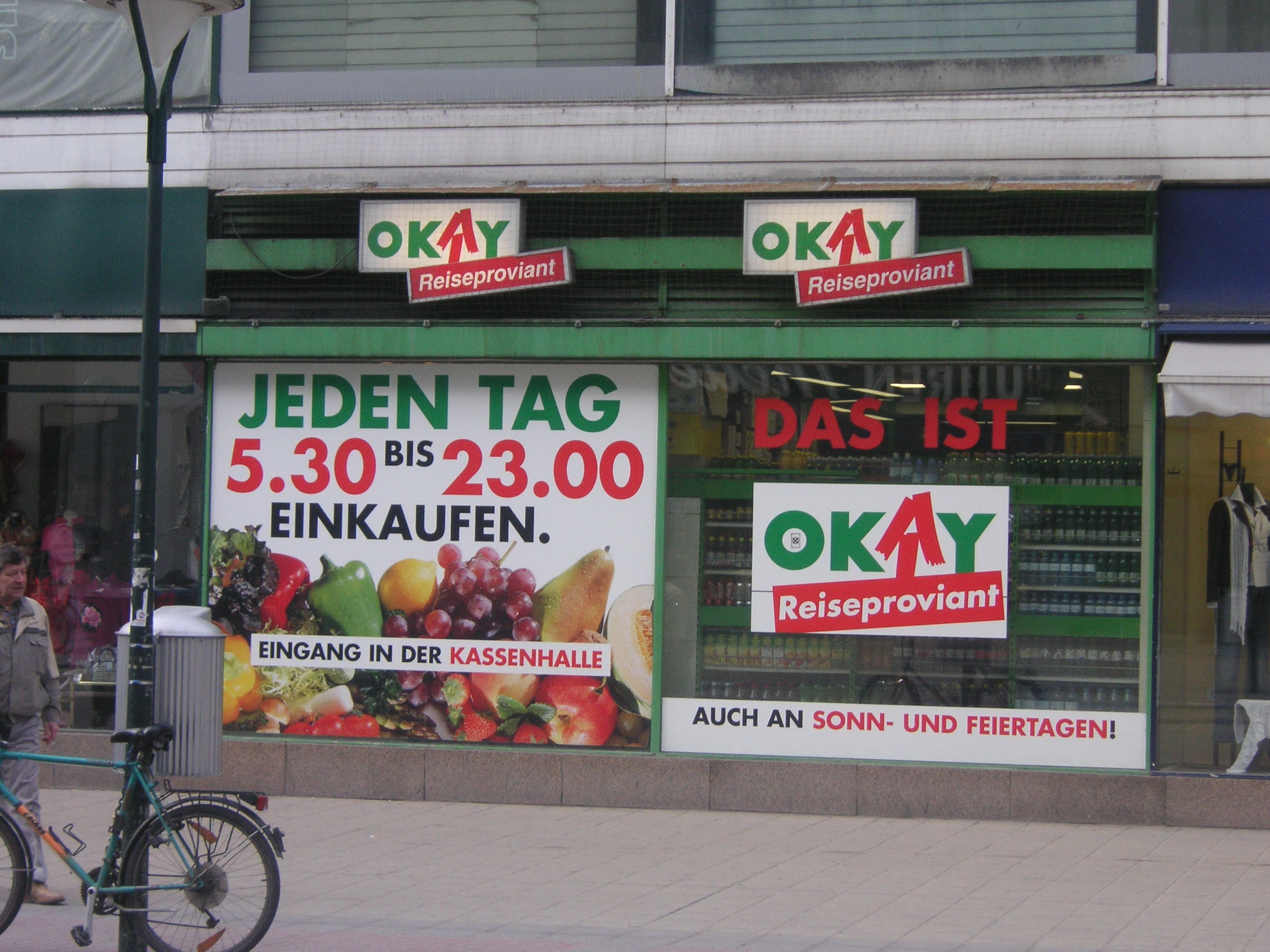
A convenience store at a Vienna train station selling Reiseproviant (travel provisions), the usual code for expanded opening hours

The situation in Austria is very similar to that in Germany, with most public holidays being based on Catholic holidays as the country is predominantly Roman Catholic. Until the 1990s, all shops closed around noon on Saturday and did not reopen until Monday morning. Entrepreneurs such as Richard Lugner lobbied for an expansion of shopping hours, and laws are gradually being changed, with more and more exceptions granted. Meanwhile, as in Germany, filling stations and train stations in big cities have taken on the role of Nahversorger ("local providers", supplying the local population with groceries) outside regular shopping hours.

Until very recently, shopping hours remained very restrictive. In 2008 Austria modified its 2003 Öffnungszeitengesetz ("opening times law"). The new regulations allow stores to open from 6:00 a.m. until 9:00 p.m. on weekdays, and on Saturday until 6:00 p.m. but they are restricted to a total of 72 open hours per week. Bakeries can open 30 minutes earlier at 5:30 a.m. Shops are closed on Sunday, but there are exceptions for tourist locations, train stations, airports, and the Christmas season.

=== Canada ===
Store hours in Canada are regulated by each province or territory and, in some provinces, individual municipalities as well.

As a general rule, there is little regulation of shopping hours across the country. In the provinces of British Columbia, Alberta, and Saskatchewan, as well as all three territories (Yukon, Northwest Territories and Nunavut), there are no restrictions at all and stores can open 24/7 every day. Nova Scotia permits any store to open every day of the year except Remembrance Day (November 11).

The remaining provinces (Manitoba, Ontario, Quebec, New Brunswick, Prince Edward Island and Newfoundland and Labrador) require stores to close on most major holidays. Furthermore, three provinces have further restrictions on Sunday openings. In Manitoba, stores may open on Sundays only with municipal approval and only between 9 am - 6 pm (although exceptions for essential services apply). New Brunswick allows Sunday opening all year only with both municipal and provincial approval; otherwise it is permitted only from August until the New Year. Some communities in New Brunswick (such as Woodstock, Miramichi, Sussex) restrict Sunday hours of operation to 12 pm - 5 pm.

The province of Quebec is the only province in Canada that regulates shopping hours outside of Sundays and holidays. As a general rule, stores are permitted to open only between 8 am and 9 pm weekdays and 8 am - 5 pm weekends, excluding holidays. There are several exceptions, however, notably several supermarkets in Montreal, which are open later hours or 24 hours a day.

In practice, few stores in Canada (except a few grocery stores) remain open 24 hours. Most shopping centres open from 10 am-9pm Monday to Friday, 9:30 am - 6 pm (or in some cases 9 pm) on Saturday and 12 pm - 5 pm or 6 pm on Sunday. Many larger stores, such as Walmart Canada, and most major grocery stores remain open 8 am - 10 pm Monday to Saturday and 10 am - 6 pm (in some provinces 8 am - 10 pm) on Sunday, except in provinces where further restrictions apply. The Sobeys chain stays open from 7 am - 11 pm on weekdays and Saturdays, though some locations are open twenty-four hours. Many Loblaws brand stores such as Zehrs Markets and Real Canadian Superstore are open from 7 am - 11 pm, 7 days a week.

=== China ===
Trading hours in China, including Hong Kong and Macau special administrative regions, are commercial decisions and are not regulated. Most shops are open on public holidays. Some convenience stores are open twenty-four hours and every day of the year, but only a few large supermarkets are open twenty-four hours a day.

During the Chinese New Year, many shops in China close for a few days, from Chinese New Year's Eve to the first day of the Chinese New Year. Or more often, to the third day of the Chinese New Year. Some shops in Hong Kong and Macau operate on Chinese New Year holidays, especially supermarket chains.

=== Croatia ===
Shopping hours in Croatia are currently unregulated after the Constitutional Court struck down a ban on Sunday shopping, which had been in effect from mid-2008 until mid-2009.

Most large out-of-town supermarkets are open between 07:30/08:00-21:00/22:00, Monday to Sunday. Shopping malls usually open at 09:00 and also close at 22:00, every day. Smaller supermarkets close earlier on Sundays, typically at 13:00. Other shops in urban areas are generally closed on Sundays.

Bakeries and newspaper kiosks often open very early in the morning, at 05:30 or 06:00, and open every day but not twenty-four hours. Filling stations and convenience stores along major roads as well as some pharmacies (at least one in each major city, five in Zagreb) operate twenty-four hours.

=== Denmark ===
Standard operating hours for most businesses are generally 8:00/8:30 - 17:30. Since 1 October 2012, Danish shops have been allowed to be open every day around the clock, except on public holidays and after 3 pm on Christmas Eve's Day and New Year Eve's Day. Shops with a turnover of less than DKK 32.2 million (2012 figure, indexed) are allowed to be open every day of the year. Still in many small towns shops are usually closed on Saturday after 2 pm and on Sunday. Some small shops are closed on Monday.

=== Finland ===
Sunday shopping was first introduced in 1994.

In 1989 shops were allowed to be open on Sundays in sparsely populated areas. In the autumn of 1994 the law was extended to apply to the conurbanations i.e. densely populated areas, but only in December and on six specifically designated Sundays.

In 1997 it was legislated that the grocery shops could be open on Sundays during the whole summer. At the same time the closing hour was set at later; 21:00.

In 2000 small markets — less than 400 m^{2} in sales area — were encouraged to be open on Sundays all year around, with the exception of four days. Also the legislation concerning (super)markets bigger than 400 m^{2} in sales area was clarified by discarding the law of six designated Sundays and replacing it with Sunday opening hours from May to August and from November to December.

On 15 December 2015, the Finnish parliament voted to remove all opening hour restrictions for all retailers. The law came into effect on 1 January 2016.

Many stores are open every day. Larger supermarkets and hypermarkets are open from 7:00 or 8:00 to 21:00 or 22:00, and smaller shops from 10:00 to 18:00 or 19:00.

The only stores with regulated hours are the nationally owned Alko alcohol shops, which are open from 9:00 to 21:00 on weekdays and from 9:00 to 18:00 on Saturdays. On Sundays all Alko stores are closed.

The sale of alcoholic beverages of over 2.8% is limited from 9:00 to 21:00 on each day of the week.

=== Germany ===
In Germany, shopping days and opening hours were previously regulated by a federal law called the "Shop Closing Law" (Ladenschlussgesetz), first enacted in 1956 and last revised on 13 March 2003. On 7 July 2006, however, the federal government handed over the authority to regulate shopping hours to the sixteen states (Länder). Since then, states have been allowed to pass their own laws regulating opening hours.

The federal Ladenschlussgesetz still applies in Bavaria and Saarland, which have not passed their own laws. Under this law, shops may not open prior to 6 am and may not stay open later than 8 p.m. from Monday to Saturday. Shops must also stay closed on Sundays and public holidays (both federal and state), and special rules apply concerning Christmas Eve (December 24) should that day fall on a weekday.

There are several exceptions, including petrol stations and shops located in railway stations and airports, which may stay open past the normal hours. Most petrol stations in larger cities, and all situated on Autobahns, are open twenty-four hours. Shops in so-called "tourist zones" may also open outside the normal hours, but they are restricted to selling souvenirs, handcrafted articles and similar tourist items. In connection with fairs and public market days, communities are allowed four days per year (normally Sundays) on which shops may open outside the normal restrictions; such shop openings may not take place during primary church services and they must close by 6 pm. Bakeries may open for business at 5.30 am and may also open for a limited time on Sundays. Restaurants, bars, theatres, and cultural establishments are generally unaffected by the shop opening time restrictions. As most public holidays in Germany are religiously based, and since the religious holidays (Protestant and Catholic) are not uniform across Germany, shops may be closed due to a public holiday in one state, and open in a neighbouring state. Bavaria even differentiates between cities with Protestant or Catholic majorities.

The Ladenschlussgesetz has been the subject of controversy, as larger stores (and many of their customers) would prefer to have fewer restrictions on shopping hours, while trade unions, small shop owners and the church are opposed to a further loosening of the rules. On June 9, 2004, the German supreme court (Bundesverfassungsgericht) rejected a claim by the German department store chain Kaufhof AG that the shop-closing law was unconstitutional. Among other things, the court cited Article 140 of the German constitution (Grundgesetz) (which in turn invokes Article 139 of the 1919 Weimar Constitution) protecting Sundays and public holidays as days of rest and recuperation. Nonetheless, the court in effect invited the federal parliament (Bundestag) to reconsider whether the states should regulate hours instead of the federal government.

So far, no state has passed a regulation that allows general store opening on Sundays.

States with no restrictions from Monday to Saturday and varying regulations for Sunday:

- Baden-Württemberg
- Berlin
- Brandenburg
- Bremen
- Hamburg
- Hesse
- Lower Saxony
- Schleswig-Holstein

States with no restrictions from Monday to Friday and varying regulations for Saturday and Sunday:

- Mecklenburg-Western Pomerania
- North Rhine-Westphalia
- Saxony-Anhalt
- Thuringia

States where shops can open between 6 a.m. and 10 p.m. from Monday to Saturday; regulations for Sunday vary:

- Rhineland-Palatinate
- Saxony

States with no liberalisation of opening hours exceeding the federal Ladenschlussgesetz:

- Bavaria
- Saarland

=== Ireland ===
Shops in Ireland may, with few exceptions (such as those involved in the sale of alcohol), open whenever they want, including Sundays and public holidays.

Here are typical hours:

- Monday - Wednesday, Saturday: 8:00/9:00/10:00 - 17:00/18:00/19:00
- Thursday - Friday: 8:00/9:00/10:00 - 20:00/21:00/22:00
- Sunday: 9:00/10:00/11:00 - 17:00/18:00/19:00

Many supermarkets are open twenty-four hours or have longer opening hours (like 8:00 - 22:00) every day.

Large shopping centres are typically open longer hours every day (e.g. 09:00 - 21:00/22:00 weekdays, 09:00 - 19:00 Saturdays, 10:00 - 19:00 Sundays).

In the two weeks running up to Christmas, it is common for many shops to have extended opening hours; some may operate twenty-four hours however the 24 hr openings are extremely uncommon and would be mainly in the large cities. On Christmas Eve most shops have shut their doors by 6 pm, some close by 3 pm.

Most shops (other than petrol stations or convenience stores) in smaller towns and villages don't open at all on Sundays. Almost all shops (except certain petrol stations, convenience stores) are closed on Christmas Day, though most are open on all other holidays.

Convenience stores and some chemists (drugstores) normally open at 09:00 and close between 18:00 and 21:00. New Year's Day is also Sunday hours.

In rural areas or in traditional trades, Businesses used to take a half day on Wednesdays, however this no longer happens.

Alcohol is allowed to be sold only between 10:30 and 22:00 from Monday to Saturday and 12:30 to 22:00 on Sundays, but this does not affect opening hours (supermarkets will often block access to alcoholic products outside of these times). Alcohol can now be sold on Good Friday as-well as having the pubs open.

=== Japan ===
In Japan, most shops open at 10:00, and close at 20:00 (8 pm). Banks are open from 09:00-15:00 on weekdays, and closed on weekends; post offices are open from 09:00-17:00 on weekdays, and closed on weekends. Convenience stores are open round the clock.

=== Mexico ===
In Mexico City, in large shopping centers, stores are generally open from 11 a.m. to 8 p.m., and on Sundays from 11 a.m. to 8 p.m. Restaurant and cinema hours are different, as are those of independent shops and markets.

=== Netherlands ===
Regular opening hours are Monday 11:00 - 18:00; Tuesday-Friday: 09:30 - 18:00; Saturday: 09:30 - 17:00; Sunday (Amsterdam, Rotterdam, The Hague, Utrecht, Almere, Leiden and smaller tourist towns): 12:00 - 18:00. In many other towns shops are open every first Sunday of the month (koopzondag).

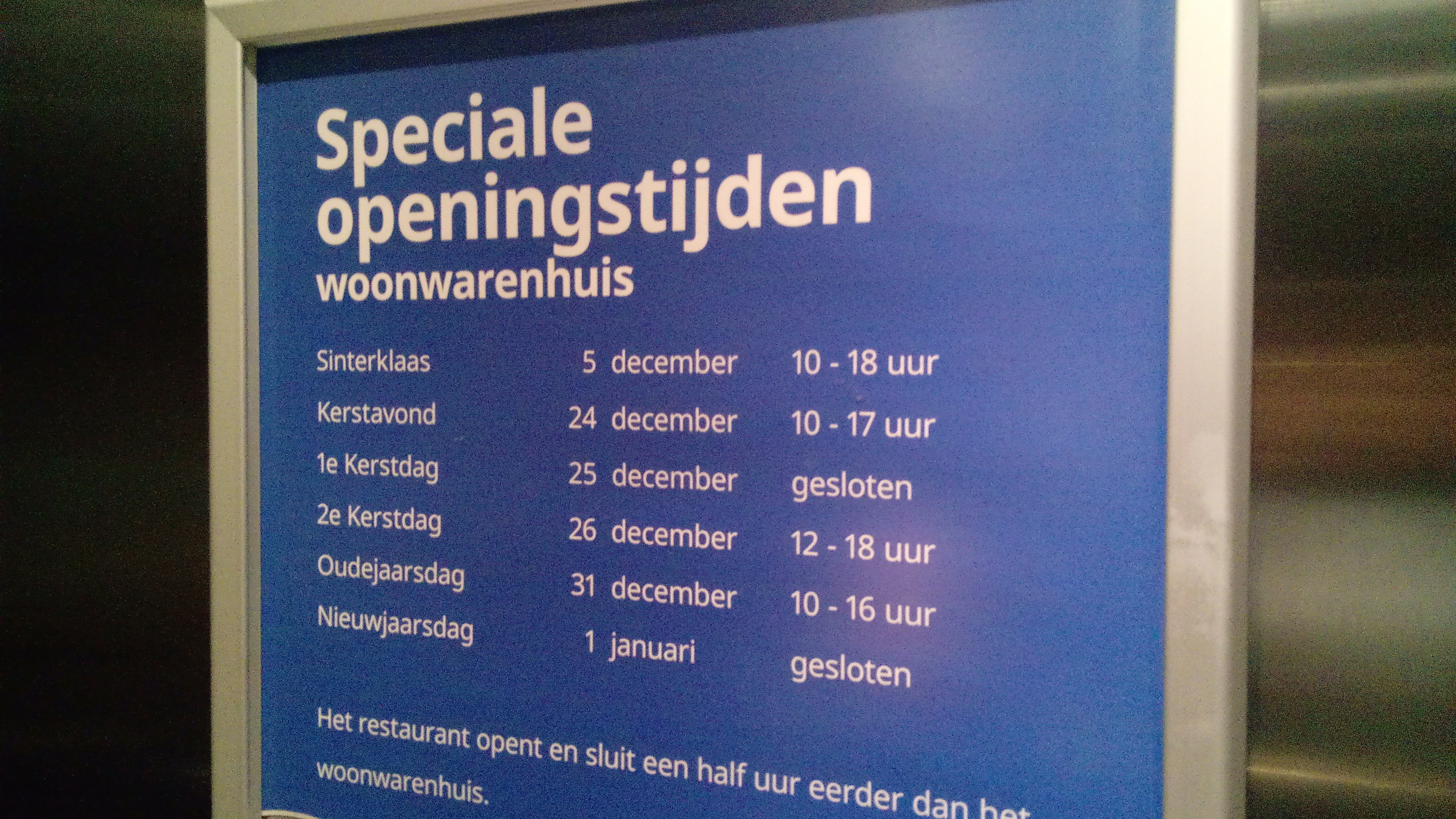
This store in Groningen is closed for Christmas and New Year's Day.

Shops are allowed to stay open until 22:00 from Monday to Saturday. Except in busy tourist areas, in or near railway stations, or for big box retailers such as Media Markt, most close at 18:00 on weekdays, and 17:00 on Saturdays, unlike Germany where retailers have taken fuller advantage of liberalization laws and most stay open till at least 19:30. Many supermarkets (including outlets of the market leader Albert Heijn, several DIY stores and IKEA) stay open until 20:00, 21:00 or 22:00. Most towns have their weekly shopping evening (koopavond), when shops stay open until 21:00, on Thursday or Friday. In touristic towns (like Amsterdam's city centre) supermarkets are allowed to open on Sundays between 07:00 and 22:00. Many towns have one or more supermarkets (avondwinkels) that are open until later in the evening, occasionally all night. Convenience stores also have longer shopping hours; they are at many larger railway stations ("Albert Heijn to go") and in some busy streets.

A regular size supermarket that is open until midnight seven days a week is the Albert Heijn at Schiphol Airport near Amsterdam (in the landside area of the airport, not just for air travelers).

On public holidays, shops that close on Sundays are usually also closed, and other shops tend to have Sunday opening hours. On Christmas Day and New Year's Eve almost all shops are closed.

For specific opening hours (openingstijden) in the Netherlands there are several websites.

=== Serbia ===
Shopping hours in Serbia are unregulated. Large supermarkets are usually open from 07:00/07:30/08:00 to 22:00 from Monday to Sunday. Shopping malls open at 09:00 or 10:00 and also stay open until 22:00. Smaller supermarkets close earlier on Sundays, at 15:00 or 16:00.

Unlike neighbouring Croatia, many fast food outlets, bakeries, kiosks and convenience stores in urban areas operate twenty-four hours. Even some hypermarkets, like Tempo and Metro, are open twenty-four hours.

=== Singapore ===
Shopping hours for shopping malls are usually from 10:00 to 22:00 from Monday to Sunday. Automotive shops like tire outlets are usually from 09.30 to 19:00. Some supermarkets are open twenty-four hours. Most stores do not open on the first day of Chinese New Year because of low demand patronage. However, the COVID-19 pandemic prompted some shopping malls and stores to shorten their operating hours, a trend that has persisted in certain locations. For instance, several outlets now close as early as 8:30 PM, reflecting changes in consumer behavior and cost management strategies. Despite these adjustments, high footfall areas like Orchard Road continue to maintain extended hours in most establishments to accommodate both locals and tourists.

=== Sweden ===
In Sweden there is no longer any law regarding shopping hours except for the nationally owned Systembolaget alcohol shops, which close at 20:00 at the latest on weekdays and 15:00 on Saturdays. On Sundays no alcohol is sold at all, although it is served in restaurants. Shopping centres and food shops are generally open every day; grocery stores often until 22:00 all days of the week and shopping centers usually until 20:00 on weekdays and 18:00 on weekends. Usually shopping centers are closed on New Year's Day, Midsummer's Day and Christmas Day, but grocery stores are open even those days albeit fewer hours than usual. Although there aren't any laws that regulate business hours in general, labour laws do not allow work between midnight and 5 am in many professions including grocery stores and most shops.

=== Switzerland ===
Shopping hours are governed by cantonal law and vary accordingly, the only confederally mandated store holiday being August 1 (the national holiday), as per article 110 III of the Swiss Constitution. Most often, stores will be open from 8 or 9 am to 7 or 8 pm, 9 pm one day a week (usually a Thursday or a Friday) depending on the region. On Saturday and the day before public holidays, most stores close at around 4 or 5 pm. Stores are also generally closed on Sundays; see Sunday shopping in Switzerland.

=== United Kingdom ===
In Great Britain, many retail stores are open every day. Some large supermarkets are open for twenty-four hours, (except on Sundays in England and Wales). Most stores do not open on Easter Sunday, New Year's Day or Christmas Day and have reduced hours on other public and bank holidays.

Typical store shopping hours:

- Mondays - Saturdays: 9:00 am to 5:30 pm, or 10:00 am to 8:00 pm/10:00 pm.
- Sundays: 10:00 am to 4:00 pm, or 11:00 am to 5:00 pm, or 12 noon to 6:00 pm.

Sunday shopping has become more popular, and most but not all shops in towns and cities are open for business. Shops 280 m^{2} and larger in England and Wales are allowed to trade for only six hours on Sundays; shops in Northern Ireland may open from 1:00 pm to 6:00 pm. In Scotland, in theory, Sunday is considered the same as any other day, and there are no restrictions. In practice, however, some shops do not open on Sunday or open for only four hours in smaller towns. In some Free Church dominated areas, for example Stornoway on the Isle of Lewis, Sunday is considered a day of rest and consequently very few if any shops open at all.

=== United States ===
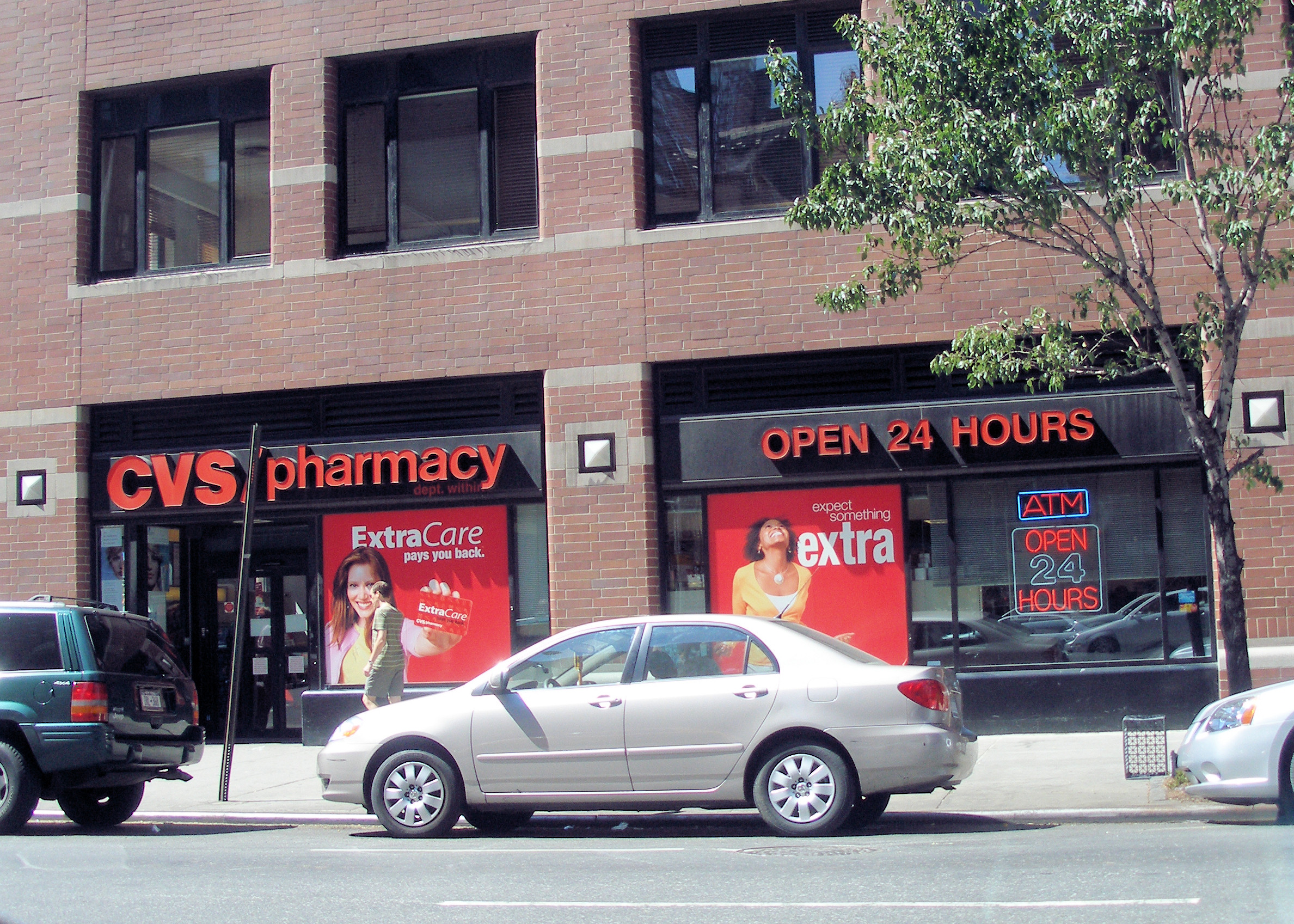
A CVS/pharmacy in New York City that is open 24/7, but remains closed on Easter, Thanksgiving, and Christmas Day

In the United States, the various levels of government generally do not regulate the hours of the vast majority of retailers (though there are exceptions, such as the blue law), and with the main exception being shops licensed to sell spirits and other alcoholic beverages (for shopping hours, see alcohol sale hours by state) and car dealerships. Shopping hours vary widely based on management considerations and customer needs. Key variables are the size of the metropolitan area, the type of store, and the size of the store.

Las Vegas, Nevada is an exception to the traditions described hereinabove. The city is world-famous for its 24-hour local culture, since it is an area with a large gambling and tourism industry that operates 24/7. Moreover, Nevada has few laws in regard to operating hours for any type of commercial activity. As a result, many of the employees in the city's primary industries work overnight shifts, and many businesses cater to such workers, turning Las Vegas into the home of many 24-hour car dealerships, dental clinics, auto mechanics, computer shops, and even some smaller clothing stores.

Typical store shopping hours:

- Monday - Saturday 9 - 10 a.m. to 8 - 10 p.m. (9:00 - 10:00 to 20:00 - 22:00)
- Sunday 11 - 12 noon to 5 - 7 p.m. (11:00 - 12:00 to 17:00 - 19:00)

Supermarkets usually open at earlier hours, between 6 or 7 a.m. to 10 p.m. (7:00 - 22:00) every day. Boutiques and smaller shops often close early at 5 or 6 p.m. (17:00 or 18:00), and usually close once or twice a week, most often on Sunday.

Nearly all stores are closed on Easter, Thanksgiving Day and Christmas Day. In recent years, however, several department stores and discount stores have started opening during the evening on Thanksgiving Day; see Black Friday for more details. Early closing (half days) occur on Christmas Eve and New Year's Eve. Some stores might have reduced hours on other major holidays.

All malls and department stores, as well as most other stores remain open longer hours between Thanksgiving weekend and Christmas Eve for Christmas and holiday shopping. Many are open until 11 p.m. (23:00), and a few even longer.

Few stores remain open twenty-four hours; the main exceptions to this rule are most Walmarts throughout the country (especially Supercenters, which combine a discount store and full supermarket); many convenience stores, especially those that also sell motor fuel; and some drug stores like CVS, especially in larger cities like New York City and Las Vegas.

Some stores, especially in suburban and rural areas, might remain closed on Sundays for any reason (such as most retail in Bergen County, New Jersey due to the blue law, which is next to New York City, and home to four major malls and has the largest retail in the nation).

== See also ==
- 24/7 service
- Blue law
- Sunday shopping
- Ladenschlußgesetz
