= Working time =

Period of time that an individual spends at paid occupational labor

Average annual working hours per employed person

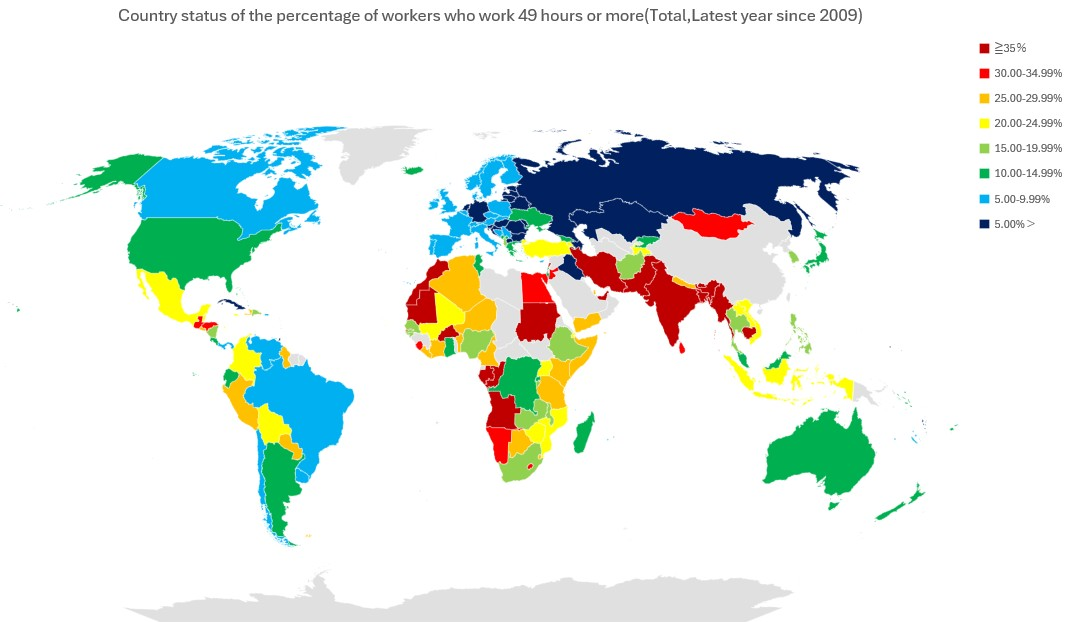
Percentage of workforce working for at least 49 hours per week

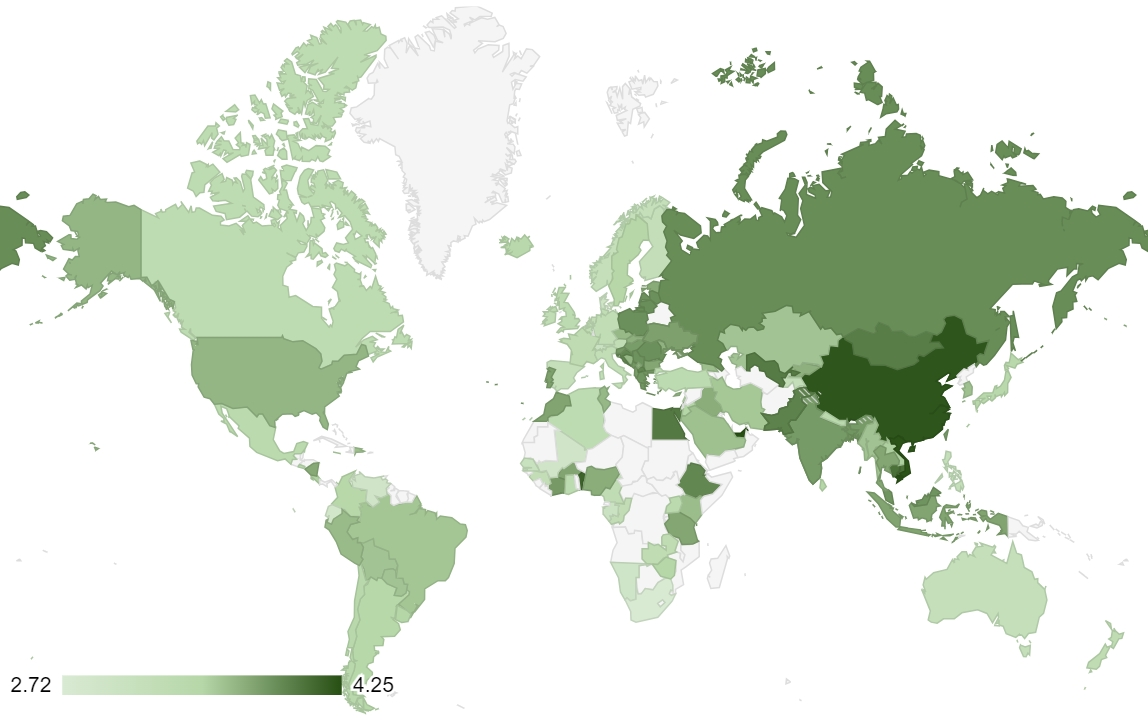
Working Time 2020

Working time or laboring time is the period of time that a person spends at paid labor. Unpaid labor such as personal housework or caring for children or pets is not considered part of the working week.

Many countries regulate the work week by law, such as stipulating minimum daily rest periods, annual holidays, and a maximum number of working hours per week. Working time may vary from person to person, often depending on economic conditions, location, culture, lifestyle choice, and the profitability of the individual's livelihood. For example, someone who is supporting children and paying a large mortgage might need to work more hours to meet basic costs of living than someone of the same earning power with lower housing costs. In developed countries like the United Kingdom, some workers are part-time because they are unable to find full-time work, but many choose reduced work hours to care for children or other family; some choose it simply to increase leisure time.

Standard working hours (or normal working hours) refers to the legislation to limit the working hours per day, per week, per month or per year. The employer pays higher rates for overtime hours as required in the law. Standard working hours of countries worldwide are around 40 to 44 hours per week - but not everywhere: from 35 hours per week in France to up to 60 hours per week in nations such as Bhutan. Maximum working hours refers to the maximum working hours of an employee. The employee cannot work more than the level specified in the maximum working hours law.

In advanced economies, working time has declined substantially over time while labor productivity and real wages have increased. In 1900, American workers worked 50% more than their counterparts today. The World Health Organization and the International Labour Organization estimated that globally in 2016 one in ten workers were exposed to working 55 or more hours per week and 745,000 persons died as a result of having a heart disease event or a stroke attributable to having worked these long hours, making exposure to long working hours the occupational risk factor with the largest disease burden.

== Hunter-gatherer ==
Since the 1960s, the consensus among anthropologists, historians, and sociologists has been that early hunter-gatherer societies enjoyed more leisure time than is permitted by capitalist and agrarian societies; for instance, one camp of !Kung Bushmen was estimated to work two-and-a-half days per week, at around 6 hours a day. Aggregated comparisons show that on average the working day was less than five hours.

Subsequent studies in the 1970s examined the Machiguenga of the Upper Amazon and the Kayapo of northern Brazil. These studies expanded the definition of work beyond purely hunting-gathering activities, but the overall average across the hunter-gatherer societies he studied was still below 4.86 hours, while the maximum was below 8 hours. Popular perception is still aligned with the old academic consensus that hunter-gatherers worked far in excess of modern humans' forty-hour week.

== History ==
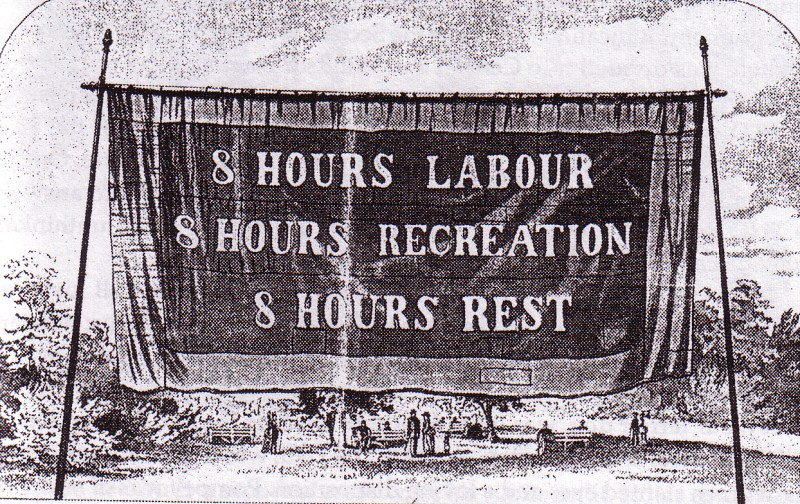
Eight-hour day banner, Melbourne, 1856

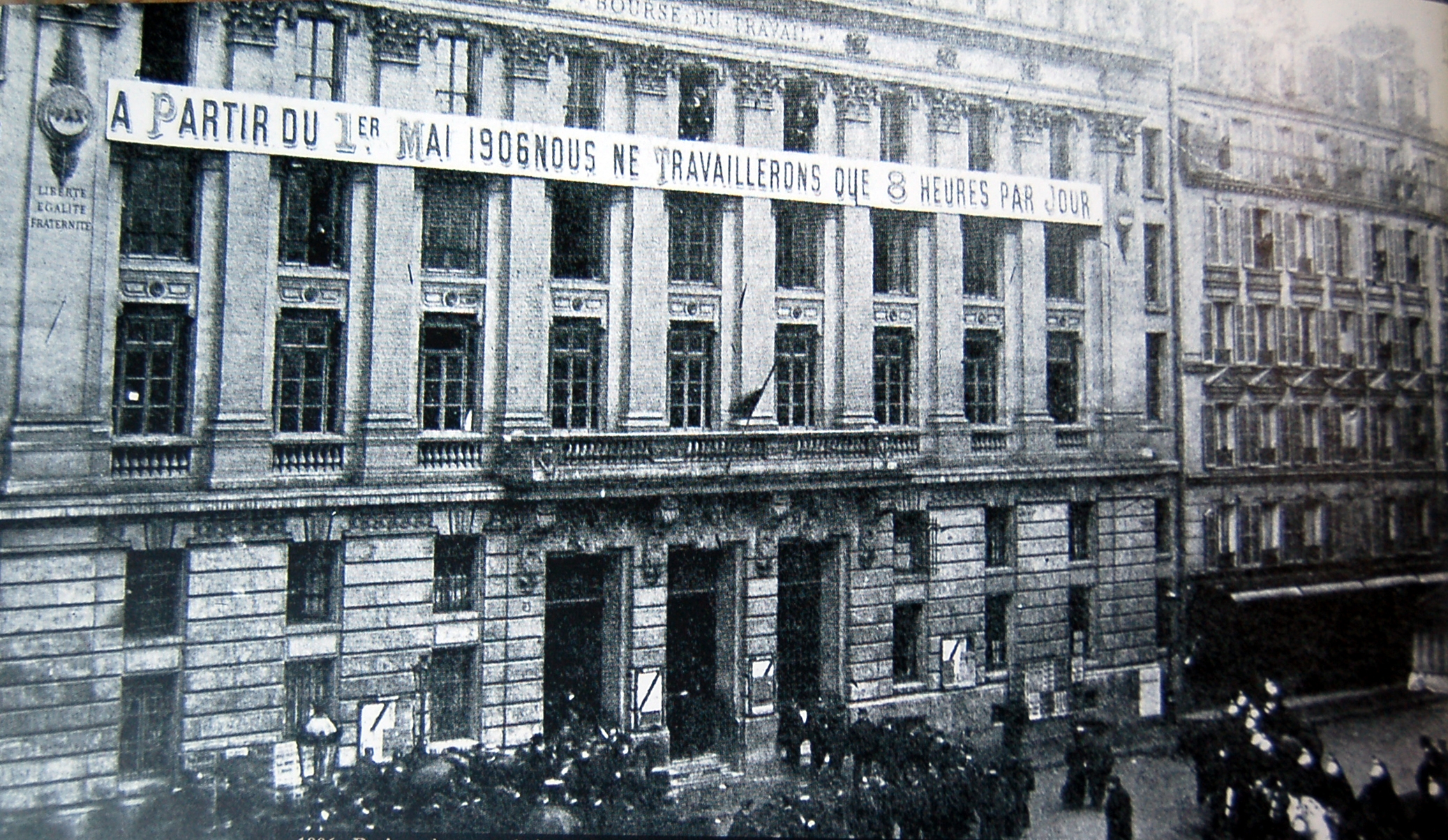
1906 – strike for the 8 working hours per day in France

The Industrial Revolution made it possible for a larger segment of the population to work year-round, because this labor was not tied to the season and artificial lighting made it possible to work longer each day. Peasants and farm laborers moved from rural areas to work in urban factories, and working time during the year increased significantly. Before collective bargaining and worker protection laws, there was a financial incentive for a company to maximize the return on expensive machinery by having long hours. Work schedules as long as twelve to sixteen hours per day, six to seven days per week were practiced in some industrial sites.

While anticipating the social encyclical Rerum novarum, in 1891 Léon Harmel was one of the first entrepreneurs to abolish the night work and to reduce working time from 12 to 10 hours a day.

Over the 20th century, work hours shortened by almost half, partly due to rising wages brought about by renewed economic growth and competition for skilled workers, with a supporting role from trade unions, collective bargaining, and progressive legislation. The workweek, in most of the industrialized world, dropped steadily, to about 40 hours after World War II. The limitation of working hours is also proclaimed by the Universal Declaration of Human Rights, International Covenant on Economic, Social and Cultural Rights, and European Social Charter. The decline continued at a faster pace in Europe: for example, France adopted a 35-hour workweek in 2000. In 1995, China adopted a 40-hour week, eliminating half-day work on Saturdays (though this is not widely practiced). Working hours in industrializing economies like South Korea, though still much higher than the leading industrial countries, are also declining steadily.

Technology has also continued to improve worker productivity, permitting standards of living to rise as hours decline. In developed economies, as the time needed to manufacture goods has declined, more working hours have become available to provide services, resulting in a shift of much of the workforce between sectors.

Economic growth in monetary terms tends to be concentrated in health care, education, government, criminal justice, corrections, and other activities rather than those that contribute directly to the production of material goods.

In the mid-2000s, the Netherlands was the first country in the industrialized world where the overall average working week dropped to less than 30 hours.

=== Gradual decrease ===
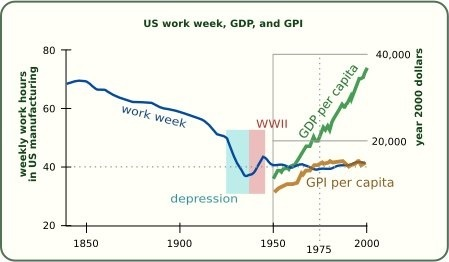
Weekly working hours in US manufacturing (blue)

Most countries in the developed world have seen average hours worked decrease significantly. For example, in the U.S in the late 19th century it was estimated that the average work week was over 60 hours per week. Today the average hours worked in the U.S. is around 33, with the average man employed full-time for 8.4 hours per work day, and the average woman employed full-time for 7.9 hours per work day. The front runners for lowest average weekly work hours are the Netherlands with 27 hours, and France with 30 hours. In a 2011 report of 26 OECD countries, Germany had the lowest average working hours per week at 25.6 hours.

The New Economics Foundation has recommended moving to a 21-hour standard work week to address problems with unemployment, high carbon emissions, low well-being, entrenched inequalities, overworking, family care, and the general lack of free time. Bill Schaninger writing for McKinsey & Company has put forward a similar proposal of a 20-hour workweek. Others, such as the historian Rutger Bregman, have argued that a 15-hour work week is reachable by 2030 and British sociologist Peter Fleming has proposed a three-day work-week. Actual work week lengths have been falling in the developed world.

Factors that have contributed to lowering average work hours and increasing standard of living have been:

- Technological advances in efficiency such as mechanization, robotics and information technology.
- More women participating in the workforce and fewer homemakers.
- Dropping fertility rates leading to fewer children needing support.

Recent articles supporting a four-day week have argued that reduced work hours would increase consumption and invigorate the economy. However, other articles state that consumption would decrease, which could reduce the environmental impact. Other arguments for the four-day week include improvements to workers' level of education (due to having extra time to take classes and courses) and improvements to workers' health (less work-related stress and extra time for exercise). Reduced hours also save money on day care costs and transportation, which in turn helps the environment with less carbon-related emissions. These benefits increase workforce productivity on a per-hour basis.

A 2026 study found, "hours worked per adult slightly decline with GDP per capita but are weakly correlated with development overall. Hours worked by the young (aged 15-19) and elderly (aged 60+) fall with development, driven entirely by growing school attendance and public pension coverage."

== Workweek structure ==
The structure of the work week varies considerably for different professions and cultures. Among salaried workers in the western world, the work week often consists of Monday to Friday or Saturday with the weekend set aside as a time of personal work and leisure. Sunday is set aside in the western world because it is the Christian sabbath.

The traditional American business hours are 9:00 a.m. to 5:00 p.m., Monday to Friday, representing a workweek of five eight-hour days comprising 40 hours in total. These are the origin of the phrase '9-to-5', used to describe a conventional and possibly tedious job. Negatively used, it connotes a tedious or unremarkable occupation. The phrase also indicates that a person is an employee, usually in a large company, rather than an entrepreneur or self-employed. More neutrally, it connotes a job with stable hours and low career risk, but still a position of subordinate employment. The actual time at work often varies between 35 and 48 hours in practice due to some employers counting breaks as part of the 40 hours and others not. In many traditional white collar positions, employees were required to be in the office during these hours to take orders from the bosses, hence the relationship between this phrase and subordination. Workplace hours have become more flexible, but the phrase is still commonly used even in situations where the term does not apply literally.

== Average annual hours per worker ==
The following list is the average annual hours worked by participants in the labor force of the OECD member states. As of 2022, Colombia, Mexico, and Costa Rica ranked the highest number of hours worked per year. Greece ranked the highest In EU with 1886 average hours per year, while Germany ranked the lowest with 1340 average hours worked respectively. Japan and Canada ranked lowest amongst non-European countries.

Average labor hours per worker in OECD countries
Code	Country	1950	1960	1970	1980	1990	2000	2005	2010	2015	2020	2022
AUS	Australia	...	...	...	...	1853	1852	1808	1778	1751	1683	1707
AUT	Austria	...	...	...	...	...	1675	1632	1552	1495	1400	1443
BEL	Belgium	...	...	1883	1707	1663	1589	1578	1574	1575	1481	1525
BGR	Bulgaria	...	...	...	...	...	1640	1659	1645	1644	1605	1618
CAN	Canada	...	...	1925	1827	1797	1787	1745	1715	1712	1644	1686
CHL	Chile	...	...	...	...	2422	2263	2157	2070	1994	1825	1962
COL	Colombia	...	...	...	...	...	...	...	...	2194	...	2405
CRI	Costa Rica	...	...	...	...	2358	2362	2352	2243	2148	1913	2149
HRV	Croatia	...	...	...	...	...	1922	1926	1942	1827	1834	1810
CYP	Cyprus	...	...	...	...	...	1926	1847	1845	1824	1698	1837
CZE	Czech Republic (Czechia)	...	...	...	...	...	1900	1803	1799	1751	1705	1754
DNK	Denmark	...	...	1845	1577	1441	1466	1451	1422	1407	1346	1371
EST	Estonia	...	...	...	...	...	1884	1913	1785	1763	1654	1770
EU27	European Union	...	...	...	...	...	1678	1652	1632	1607	1513	1570
FIN	Finland	...	1967	1918	1732	1671	1650	1613	1585	1555	1531	1498
FRA	France	2351	2188	1993	1806	1645	1558	1532	1540	1519	1402	1511
DEU	Germany	...	...	...	...	...	1466	1432	1426	1401	1332	1340
GRC	Greece	...	...	...	...	1976	1998	2025	1931	1935	1728	1886
HUN	Hungary	...	...	...	2348	2082	1932	1834	1766	1746	1660	1699
ISL	Iceland	...	...	1954	1688	1665	1696	1637	1528	1511	1435	1449
IRL	Ireland	...	...	2335	2123	2081	1933	1883	1721	1771	1746	1657
ISR	Israel	...	...	...	...	1904	2033	1966	1957	1895	1783	1891
ITA	Italy	...	...	...	...	...	1850	1811	1777	1718	1559	1694
JPN	Japan	...	...	2243	2121	2031	1821	1775	1733	1719	1598	1607
KOR	Korea, Republic of (South Korea)	...	...	...	...	...	...	...	2163	2083	1908	1901
LVA	Latvia	...	...	...	...	...	1728	1666	1692	1663	1577	1553
LTU	Lithuania	...	...	...	...	...	1630	1659	1697	1673	1595	1624
LUX	Luxembourg	...	...	...	...	...	1602	1550	1517	1514	1427	1473
MLT	Malta	...	...	...	...	...	2246	2167	2136	1955	1827	1881
MEX	Mexico	...	...	...	...	...	2174	2105	2150	2140	2124	2226
NLD	Netherlands	...	...	1809	1556	1454	1464	1434	1420	1426	1399	1427
NZL	New Zealand	...	...	...	...	1809	1836	1815	1755	1753	1739	1748
NOR	Norway	...	...	1835	1580	1503	1457	1406	1395	1392	1369	1424
OECD	OECD	...	...	1966	1893	1860	1825	1793	1772	1764	1687	1751
POL	Poland	...	...	...	...	...	1869	1855	1831	1862	1766	1814
PRT	Portugal	...	...	1963	1849	1806	1770	1750	1746	1732	1613	1635
ROU	Romania	...	...	...	...	...	1853	1877	1841	1786	1795	1808
RUS	Russia (Russian Federation)	...	...	...	...	...	1982	1989	1976	1978	1874	1874
SVK	Slovakia	...	...	...	...	...	1816	1769	1805	1754	1572	1622
SVN	Slovenia	...	...	...	...	...	1710	1697	1680	1687	1515	1619
ESP	Spain	...	...	...	1936	1763	1753	1724	1706	1694	1577	1643
SWE	Sweden	1824	1718	1565	1382	1423	1486	1453	1484	1466	1424	1440
CHE	Switzerland	...	...	...	...	...	1713	1690	1611	1577	1495	1528
TUR	Turkey	...	...	2086	1957	1866	1937	1936	1877	1811	...	1732
GBR	United Kingdom (Great Britain)	...	...	1775	1619	1618	1558	1544	1507	1525	1367	1531
USA	United States	1968	1952	1907	1816	1833	1832	1794	1772	1783	1767	1810

=== Trends over time ===
Average annual hours actually worked per worker in OECD countries from 1970 to 2020

== Asia ==
=== India ===
Indian labour law has, in theory, offered protection to labour rights. However, the average office worker, women and the IT sector are unofficially forced to work overtime without overtime pay. The software billionaire CEO Narayana Murthy recently stated, "Somehow our youth have the habit of taking not-so-desirable habits from the West. My request is that our youngsters must say – 'This is my country. I want to work 70 hours a week'. This is exactly what the Germans and Japanese did after the Second World War". This sparked a national debate with many male CEO's strongly supporting 70-hour workweeks to boost productivity and cover losses due to the Corona Pandemic. A 70-hour workweek translates to working approximately 12 hours a day, for six days a week, a phenomenon unofficially occurring in the IT industry. Women in all workplaces are at risk of overwork despite the existence of work laws. Many women already worked much more than 70 hours a week - at both the office and their homes. Anna Sebastian Perayil, a 26-year old a young Chartered Accountant (CA) from Kerala, had started working in the E&Y Pune office on 18 March 2024, but her premature death within 4 months on 20 July 2024 due to stress caused by overwork, presenteeism, exhaustion and fatigue has re-ignited the debate about toxic work culture in India. Since the pandemic began, various Indian CEOs have repeatedly advocated for this work culture.

=== South Korea ===
South Korea has the fastest shortening working time in the OECD, which is the result of the government's proactive move to lower working hours at all levels and to increase leisure and relaxation time, which introduced the mandatory forty-hour, five-day working week in 2004 for companies with over 1,000 employees. Beyond regular working hours, it is legal to demand up to 12 hours of overtime during the week, plus another 16 hours on weekends. The 40-hour workweek expanded to companies with 300 employees or more in 2005, 100 employees or more in 2006, 50 or more in 2007, 20 or more in 2008 and a full inclusion to all workers nationwide in July 2011. The government has continuously increased public holidays to 16 days in 2013, more than the 10 days of the United States and double that of the United Kingdom's 8 days. Despite those efforts, South Korea's work hours are still relatively long, with an average 1,874 hours per year in 2023

=== Japan ===
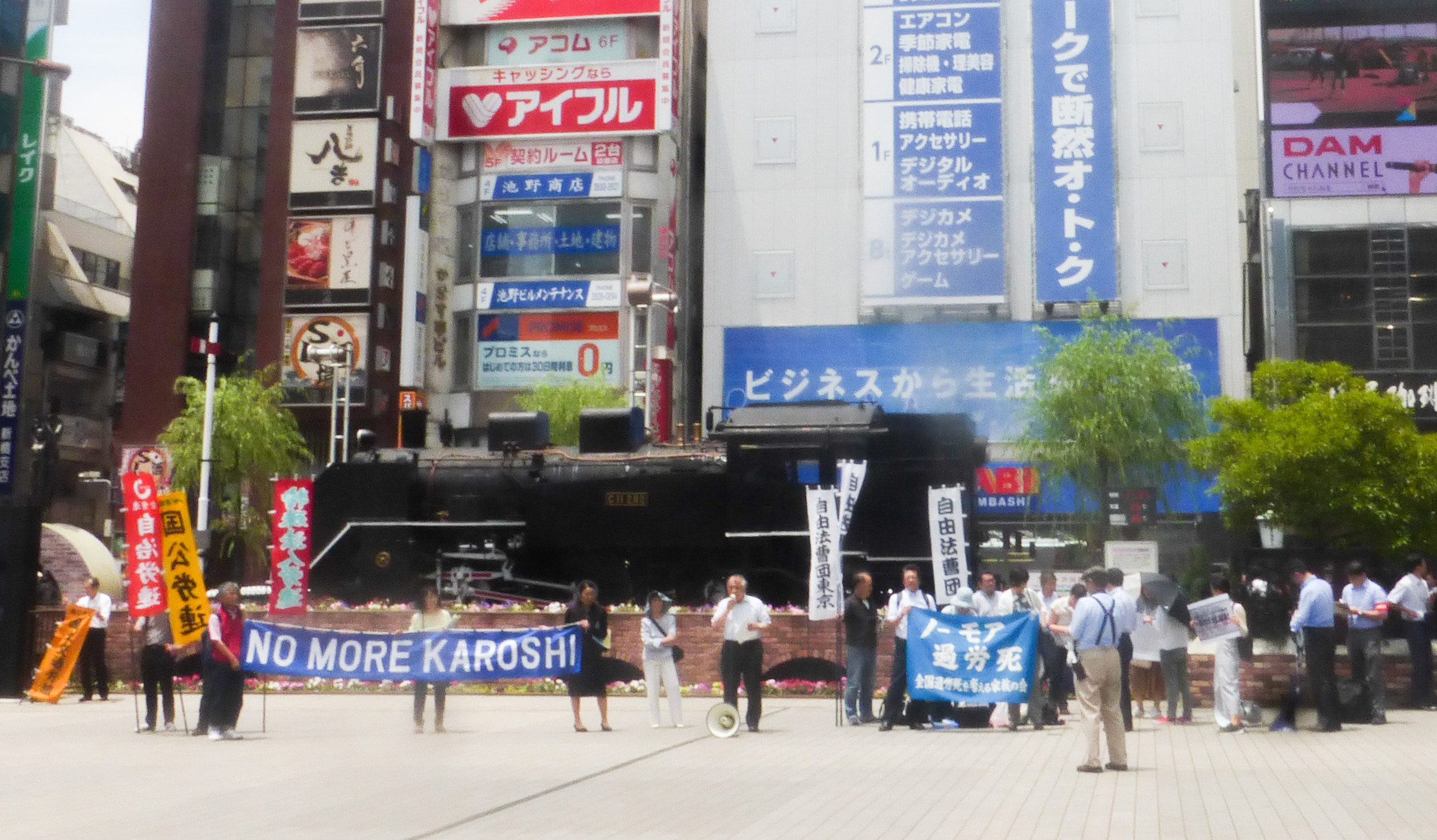
A "No More Karoshi" protest in Tokyo, 2018

Work hours in Japan are decreasing, but many Japanese still work long hours. Recently, Japan's Ministry of Health, Labor and Welfare (MHLW) issued a draft report recommending major changes to the regulations that govern working hours. The centerpiece of the proposal is an exemption from overtime pay for white-collar workers. Japan has enacted an 8-hour work day and 40-hour work week (44 hours in specified workplaces). The overtime limits are: 15 hours a week, 27 hours over two weeks, 43 hours over four weeks, 45 hours a month, 81 hours over two months and 120 hours over three months; however, some workers get around these restrictions by working several hours a day without 'clocking in' whether physically or metaphorically. The overtime allowance should not be lower than 125% and not more than 150% of the normal hourly rate. Workaholism in Japan is considered a serious social problem leading to early death, a phenomenon dubbed karōshi, meaning death from overwork.

=== Mainland China ===
By law, China adopted a 40-hour week, eliminating half-day work on Saturdays.

Work hours have reportedly been falling for about three decades due to rising productivity, better labor laws, and the spread of the two-day weekend. The trend has affected both factories and white-collar companies that have been responding to growing demands for easier work schedules.

The 996 working hour system, as it is known, is where employees work from 09:00 to 21:00, six days a week, excluding two hours of lunch & nap during the noon and one hour of supper in the evening. Alibaba founder Jack (Yun) Ma, and JD.Com founder Richard (Qiangdong) Liu both praise the 996 schedule, saying such a schedule has helped Chinese tech giants like Alibaba and Tencent grow to become what they are today.

=== Hong Kong ===
Hong Kong has no legislation regarding maximum and normal working hours. The average weekly working hours of full-time employees in Hong Kong is 49 hours. According to the Price and Earnings Report 2012 conducted by UBS, while the global and regional average were 1,915 and 2,154 hours per year respectively, the average working hours in Hong Kong is 2,296 hours per year, which ranked the fifth longest yearly working hours among 72 countries under study. In addition, from the survey conducted by the Public Opinion Study Group of the University of Hong Kong, 79% of the respondents agree that the problem of overtime work in Hong Kong is "severe", and 65% of the respondents support the legislation on the maximum working hours. In Hong Kong, 70% of surveyed do not receive any overtime remuneration. These show that people in Hong Kong concerns the working time issues. As Hong Kong implemented the minimum wage law in May 2011, the Chief Executive, Donald Tsang, of the Special Administrative Region pledged that the government will standardize working hours in Hong Kong.

On 26 November 2012, the Labour Department of the HKSAR released the "Report of the policy study on standard working hours". The report covers three major areas, including: (1) the regimes and experience of other places in regulating working hours, (2) latest working time situations of employees in different sectors, and (3) estimation of the possible impact of introducing standard working hour in Hong Kong. Under the selected parameters, from most loosen to most stringent, the estimated increase in labour cost vary from 1.1 billion to 55 billion HKD, and affect 957,100 (36.7% of total employees) to 2,378,900 (91.1% of total) employees.

Various sectors of the community show concerns about the standard working hours in Hong Kong. The points are summarized as below:

=== Labor organizations ===
Hong Kong Catholic Commission For Labour Affairs urges the government to legislate the standard working hours in Hong Kong, and suggests a 44 hours standard, 54 hours maximum working hours in a week. The organization thinks that long working time adversely affects the family and social life and health of employees; it also indicates that the current Employment Ordinance does not regulate overtime pays, working time limits nor rest day pays, which can protect employees rights.

=== Businesses and related organizations ===
Generally, business sector agrees that it is important to achieve work–life balance, but does not support a legislation to regulate working hours limit. They believe "standard working hours" is not the best way to achieve work–life balance and the root cause of the long working hours in Hong Kong is due to insufficient labor supply. The managing director of Century Environmental Services Group, Catherine Yan, said "Employees may want to work more to obtain a higher salary due to financial reasons. If standard working hour legislation is passed, employers will need to pay a higher salary to employees, and hence the employers may choose to segment work tasks to employer more part time employees instead of providing overtime pay to employees." She thinks this will lead to a situation that the employees may need to find two part-time jobs to earn their living, making them wasting more time on transportation from one job to another.

The Chairman of the Hong Kong General Chamber of Commerce, Chow Chung-kong believes that it is so difficult to implement standard working hours that apply "across-the-board", specifically, to accountants and barristers. In addition, he believes that standard working hours may decrease individual employees' working hours and would not increase their actual income. It may also lead to an increase of number of part-timers in the labor market.

According to a study conducted jointly by the Business, Economic and Public Affairs Research Centre and Enterprise and Social Development Research Centre of Hong Kong Shue Yan University, 16% surveyed companies believe that a standard working hours policy can be considered, and 55% surveyed think that it would be difficult to implement standard working hours in businesses.

Employer representative in the Labour Advisory Board, Stanley Lau, said that standard working hours will completely alter the business environment of Hong Kong, affect small and medium enterprise and weaken competitiveness of businesses. He believes that the government can encourage employers to pay overtime salary, and there is no need to regulate standard working hours.

=== Political parties ===
On 17–18 October 2012, the Legislative Council members in Hong Kong debated on the motion "legislation for the regulation of working hours". Cheung Kwok-che proposed the motion "That is the Council urges the Government to introduce a bill on the regulation of working hours within this legislative session, the contents of which must include the number of standard weekly hours and overtime pay". As the motion was not passed by both functional constituencies and geographical constituencies, it was negatived.

The Hong Kong Federation of Trade Unions suggested a standard 44-hour work week with overtime pay of 1.5 times the usual pay. It believes the regulation of standard working hour can prevent the employers to force employees to work (overtime) without pay.

Elizabeth Quat of the Democratic Alliance for the Betterment and Progress of Hong Kong (DAB), believed that standard working hours were a labor policy and was not related to family-friendly policies. The Vice President of Young DAB, Wai-hung Chan, stated that standard working hours would bring limitations to small and medium enterprises. He thought that the government should discuss the topic with the public more before legislating standard working hours.

The Democratic Party suggested a 44-hour standard work week and compulsory overtime pay to help achieve the balance between work, rest and entertainment of people in Hong Kong.

The Labour Party believed regulating working hours could help achieve a work–life balance. It suggests an 8-hour work day, a 44-hour standard work week, a 60-hour maximum work week and an overtime pay of 1.5 times the usual pay.

Poon Siu-ping of Federation of Hong Kong and Kowloon Labour Unions thought that it is possible to set work hour limit for all industries; and the regulation on working hours can ensure the overtime payment by employers to employees, and protect employees' health.

The Civic party suggests "to actively study setting weekly standard working hours at 44 hours to align with family-friendly policies" in LegCo Election 2012.

Member of Economic Synergy, Jeffery Lam, believes that standard working hours would adversely affect productivity, tense the employer-employee relationship, and increase the pressure faced by businesses who suffer from inadequate workers. He does not support the regulation on working hours at its current situation.

==== Government ====
Matthew Cheung Kin-chung, the Secretary for Labour and Welfare Bureau, said the Executive Council has already received the government report on working hours in June, and the Labour Advisory Board and the LegCo's Manpower Panel will receive the report in late November and December respectively. On 26 November 2012, the Labour Department released the report, and the report covered the regimes and experience of practicing standard working hours in selected regions, current work hour situations in different industries, and the impact assessment of standard working hours. Also, Matthew Cheung mentioned that the government will form a select committee by first quarter of 2013, which will include government officials, representative of labor unions and employers' associations, academics and community leaders, to investigate the related issues. He also said that it would "perhaps be unrealistic" to put forward a bill for standard working hours in the next one to two years.

==== Academics ====
Yip Siu-fai, Professor of the Department of Social Work and Social Administration of HKU, has noted that professions such as nursing and accountancy have long working hours and that this may affect people's social life. He believes that standard working hours could help to give Hong Kong more family-friendly workplaces and to increase fertility rates. Randy Chiu, Professor of the Department of Management of HKBU, has said that introducing standard working hours could avoid excessively long working hours of employees. He also said that nowadays Hong Kong attains almost full employment, has a high rental price and severe inflation, recently implemented minimum wage, and is affected by a gloomy global economy; he also mentioned that comprehensive considerations on macroeconomic situations are needed, and emphasized that it is perhaps inappropriate to adopt working-time regulation as exemplified in other countries to Hong Kong.

Lee Shu-Kam, Associate Professor of the Department of Economics and Finance of HKSYU, believes that standard working hours cannot deliver "work–life balance". He referenced the research to the US by the University of California, Los Angeles in 1999 and pointed out that in the industries and regions in which the wage elasticity is low, the effects of standard working hours on lowering actual working time and increasing wages is limited: for regions where the labor supply is inadequate, standard working hours can protect employees' benefits yet cause unemployment; but for regions (such as Japan) where the problem does not exist, standard working hours would only lead to unemployment.

Francis Lui, Head and Professor of the Department of Economics of Hong Kong University of Science and Technology, believed that standard working hours may not lower work time but increase unemployment. He used Japan as an example to illustrate that the implementation of standard working hours lowered productivity per head and demotivated the economy. He also said that even if the standard working hours can shorten employees' weekly working hours, they may need to work for more years to earn sufficient amount of money for retirement, i.e. delay their retirement age. The total working time over the course of a lifetime may not change.

In 2012, Lok-sang Ho, Professor of Economics and Director of the Centre for Public Policy Studies of Lingnan University, pointed out that "as different employees perform various jobs and under different degrees of pressures, it may not be appropriate to establish standard working hours in Hong Kong"; and he proposed a 50-hour maximum work week to protect workers' health.

=== Taiwan ===
In 2018, Taiwan had the world's 4th longest work hour and 2nd in Asia, with the average number of work hours hit 2,033 hours. There had been reduction in the work hours by 122 from 2008 to 2018.

=== Malaysia ===
Since 1 September 2022, the weekly work hour in Malaysia was reduced from 48 hours to 45 hours after it was promulgated in the Dewan Negara.

=== Singapore ===
Singapore has an 8-hour normal work day (9 hours including lunchtime), a 45-hour normal working week, and a maximum 48-hour work week. If the employee works no more than five days a week, the employee's normal working day is 9 hours and the working week is 44 hours. Also, if the number of hours worked by the worker is less than 44 hours every alternate week, the 44-hour weekly limit may be exceeded in the other week. However, this is subject to the pre-specification in the service contract, and the maximum should not exceed 48 hours per week or 88 hours in any consecutive two week period. In addition, a shift worker can work up to 12 hours a day, provided that the average working hours per week do not exceed 44 over a consecutive three-week period. The overtime allowance per overtime hour must not be less than 1.5 times the employee's hourly basic rates.

== Europe ==
In most European Union countries, working time is gradually decreasing. The European Union's working time directive imposes a 48-hour maximum working week that applies to every member state except Malta (which have an opt-out, meaning that employees in Malta may work longer than 48 hours if they wish, but they cannot be forced to do so). A major reason for the lower annual hours worked in Europe is a relatively high amount of paid annual leave. Fixed employment comes with four to six weeks of holiday as standard.

=== France ===
France experimented in 2000 with a sharp cut of legal or statutory working time of the employees in the private and public sector from 39 hours a week to 35 hours a week, with the stated goal to fight against rampant unemployment at that time. The Law 2000–37 on working time reduction is also referred to as the Aubry Law, according to the name of the Labor Minister at that time. Employees may (and do) work more than 35 hours a week, yet in this case firms must pay them overtime bonuses. If the bonus is determined through collective negotiations, it cannot be lower than 10%. If no agreement on working time is signed, the legal bonus must be of 25% for the first 8 hours, then goes up to 50% for the rest. Including overtime, the maximum working time cannot exceed 48 hours per week, and should not exceed 44 hours per week over 12 weeks in a row. In France the labor law also regulates the minimum working hours: part-time jobs should not allow for less than 24 hours per week without a branch collective agreement. These agreements can allow for less, under tight conditions. According to the official statistics (DARES), after the introduction of the law on working time reduction, actual hours per week performed by full-time employed, fell from 39.6 hours in 1999, to a trough of 37.7 hours in 2002, then gradually went back to 39.1 hours in 2005. In 2016 working hours were of 39.1.

=== Hungary ===
In Hungary, during the Kádár era, a government decree issued on April 27, 1981, mandated the change, and it was gradually introduced as a welfare measure later that year and in 1982. At that time, the workweek was still 42 hours; it was reduced to 40 hours in 1984. (A 48-hour workweek had been introduced in 1951, followed by a 44-hour workweek between 1967 and 1975). It brought about significant changes in education, transport schedules, sports, and even television programming. In education, the previous 11-day teaching cycle was replaced by a ten-day cycle.

=== United Kingdom ===
The maximum working week in the United Kingdom is 48 hours a week on average, which is typically averaged over 17 weeks. Workers have the choice of opting out of the 48-maximum week. There also exceptions to the maximum working week including – but not limited to – being in the armed forces, emergency services or police. This was established in 1998 by the Working Time Regulations 1998.

=== Spain ===
The main labor law in Spain, the Workers' Statute Act, limits the amount of working time that an employee is obliged to perform. In the Article 34 of this law, a maximum of 9 hours per day and 40 hours per week are established.

Employees typically receive either 12 or 14 payments per year, with approximately 21 days of vacation. According to Spanish law, Spain holds what is known as the Convenios-Colectivos, which stipulates that different regulations and laws regarding employee work week and wage apply based on the type of job. Overall they rank as the 13th highest in regard to international GDP growth.

According to a study of the OECD Better Life Index, 4% of Spanish workers work more than 50 hours per week, compared to an average of 11% of workers in OECD countries.

Working hours are regulated by law. Mandatory logging of employee working time has been in place since 2019 in an attempt by legislators to eliminate unpaid overtime and push for more transparency of actual working hours. Non-regulated pauses during the workday for coffee or smoking are not permitted to be documented as working time, according to a ruling by The Spanish National Court in February 2020.

==== Traditional mid-day break ====
However, one of the interesting aspects of the Spanish work day and labor is the traditional presence of a break around lunchtime. It is sometimes mistakenly thought to be due to siesta, but in fact was due to workers returning to their families for the main midday meal. That break, typically of 1 or 2 hours, has been kept in the working culture because in the post-civil-war period most workers had two jobs to be able to sustain their families. Following this tradition, in small and medium-sized cities, restaurants and businesses shut down during this time period of 2–5 for retail and 4–8 for restaurants. Many office jobs only allow one hour or even a half hour breaks to eat the meal in office building restaurants or designated lunch rooms.

A majority of adults emphasize the lack of a siesta during the typical work week. Only one in ten Spaniards take a mid-day nap, a percentage less than other European nations.

== America ==
=== Colombia ===
In June 2021, the Colombian Congress approved a bill for the reduction of the work-week, from 48 to 42 hours, which will be implemented in several stages, from 2023 to 2026. In accordance with it, articles 161 to 167 of the Substantive Work Code in Colombia provide for a maximum of 42 hours of work a week, distributed in 5 or 6 days, at the discretion of the employer (as of July 2025, the work-week is 44 hours). Also, the law notes that workdays should be divided into 2 sections to allow a break, usually given as the meal time which is not counted as work. Typically, there is a 2-hours break for lunch that starts from 12:00 through 13:00.

=== Mexico ===
Mexican laws mandate a maximum of 48 hours of work per week, but they are rarely observed or enforced due to loopholes in the law, the volatility of labor rights in Mexico, and its underdevelopment relative to other members countries of the Organisation for Economic Co-operation and Development (OECD). Indeed, private sector employees often work overtime without receiving overtime compensation. Fear of unemployment and threats by employers explain in part why the 48-hour work week is disregarded.

=== United States ===
In 2016, the average man employed full-time worked 8.4 hours per work day, and the average woman employed full-time worked 7.8 hours per work day. There is no mandatory minimum amount of paid time off for sickness or holiday but the majority of full-time civilian workers have access to paid vacation time.

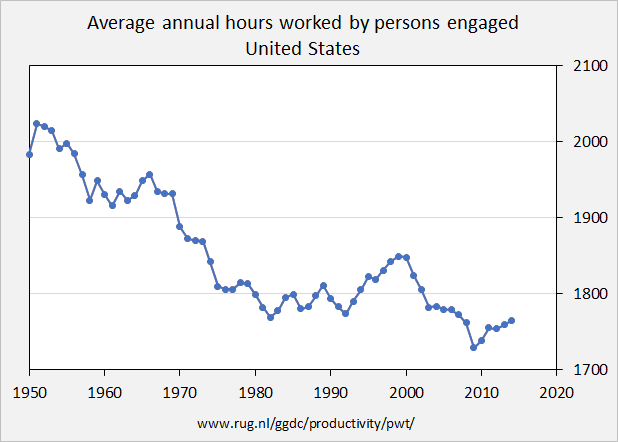
Average annual hours worked by persons engaged in the United States

By 1946, the United States government had inaugurated the 40-hour work week for all federal employees. Beginning in 1950, under the Truman Administration, the United States became the first known industrialized nation to explicitly (albeit secretly) and permanently forswear a reduction of working time. Given the military-industrial requirements of the Cold War, the authors of the then secret National Security Council Report 68 (NSC-68) proposed the US government undertake a massive permanent national economic expansion that would let it "siphon off" a part of the economic activity produced to support an ongoing military buildup to contain the Soviet Union. In his 1951 Annual Message to the Congress, President Truman stated:

In terms of manpower, our present defense targets will require an increase of nearly one million men and women in the armed forces within a few months, and probably not less than four million more in defense production by the end of the year. This means that an additional 8 percent of our labor force, and possibly much more, will be required by direct defense needs by the end of the year. These manpower needs will call both for increasing our labor force by reducing unemployment and drawing in women and older workers, and for lengthening hours of work in essential industries.

According to the Bureau of Labor Statistics, the average non-farm private sector employee worked 34.5 hours per week as of June 2012.

As President Truman's 1951 message had predicted, the share of working women rose from 30 percent of the labor force in 1950 to 47 percent by 2000 – growing at a particularly rapid rate during the 1970s. According to a Bureau of Labor Statistics report issued May 2002, "In 1950, the overall participation rate of women was 34 percent. ... The rate rose to 38 percent in 1960, 43 percent in 1970, 52 percent in 1980, and 58 percent in 1990 and reached 60 percent by 2000. The overall labor force participation rate of women is projected to attain its highest level in 2010, at 62 percent." The inclusion of women in the work force can be seen as symbolic of social progress as well as of increasing American productivity and hours worked.

Between 1950 and 2007 official price inflation was measured to 861 percent. President Truman, in his 1951 message to Congress, predicted correctly that his military buildup "will cause intense and mounting inflationary pressures." Using the data provided by the United States Bureau of Labor Statistics, Erik Rauch has estimated productivity to have increased by nearly 400%. According to Rauch, "if productivity means anything at all, a worker should be able to earn the same standard of living as a 1950 worker in only 11 hours per week."

In the United States, the working time for upper-income professionals has increased compared to 1965, while total annual working time for low-skill, low-income workers has decreased. This effect is sometimes called the "leisure gap".

The average working time of married couples – of both spouses taken together – rose from 56 hours in 1969 to 67 hours in 2000.

=== Overtime rules ===
Many professional workers put in longer hours than the forty-hour standard. In professional industries like investment banking and large law firms, a forty-hour workweek is considered inadequate and may result in job loss or failure to be promoted. Medical residents in the United States routinely work long hours as part of their training.

Workweek policies are not uniform in the U.S. Many compensation arrangements are legal, and three of the most common are wage, commission, and salary payment schemes. Wage earners are compensated on a per-hour basis, whereas salaried workers are compensated on a per-week or per-job basis, and commission workers get paid according to how much they produce or sell.

Under most circumstances, wage earners and lower-level employees may be legally required by an employer to work more than forty hours in a week; however, they are paid extra for the additional work. Many salaried workers and commission-paid sales staff are not covered by overtime laws. These are generally called "exempt" positions, because they are exempt from federal and state laws that mandate extra pay for extra time worked. The rules are complex, but generally exempt workers are executives, professionals, or sales staff. For example, school teachers are not paid extra for working extra hours. Business owners and independent contractors are considered self-employed, and none of these laws apply to them.

Generally, workers are paid time-and-a-half, or 1.5 times the worker's base wage, for each hour of work past forty. California also applies this rule to work in excess of eight hours per day, but exemptions and exceptions significantly limit the applicability of this law.

In some states, firms are required to pay double-time, or twice the base rate, for each hour of work past 60, or each hour of work past 12 in one day in California, also subject to numerous exemptions and exceptions. This provides an incentive for companies to limit working time, but makes these additional hours more desirable for the worker. It is not uncommon for overtime hours to be accepted voluntarily by wage-earning workers. Unions often treat overtime as a desirable commodity when negotiating how these opportunities shall be partitioned among union members.

=== Brazil ===
Brazil has a 44-hour work week, normally 8 hours per day and 4 hours on Saturday or 8.8 hours per day. Jobs with no meal breaks or on-duty meal breaks are 6 hours per day. Public servants work 40 hours per week.

Lunch breaks are one hour and are not usually counted as work. A typical work schedule is 8:00 or 9:00–12:00, 13:00–18:00. In larger cities, workers eat lunch on or near their work site, while some workers in smaller cities may go home for lunch.

A 30-day vacation is mandated by law. Holidays vary by municipality with approximately 13 to 15 holidays per year.

== Australia ==
In Australia, between 1974 and 1997 no marked change took place in the average amount of time spent at work by Australians of "prime working age" (that is, between 25 and 54 years of age). Throughout this period, the average time spent at work by prime working-age Australians (including those who did not spend any time at work) remained stable at between 27 and 28 hours per week. This unchanging average, however, masks a significant redistribution of work from men to women. Between 1974 and 1997, the average time spent at work by prime working-age Australian men fell from 45 to 36 hours per week, while the average time spent at work by prime working-age Australian women rose from 12 to 19 hours per week. In the period leading up to 1997, the amount of time Australian workers spent at work outside the hours of 9 a.m. to 5 p.m. on weekdays also increased.

In 2009, a rapid increase in the number of working hours was reported in a study by The Australia Institute. The study found the average Australian worked 1855 hours per year at work. According to Clive Hamilton of The Australia Institute, this surpasses even Japan. The Australia Institute believes that Australians work the highest number of hours in the developed world.

The 38 hour working week was introduced in 1983.

The majority of full-time employees in Australia work additional overtime hours. A 2015 survey found that of Australia's 7.7 million full-time workers, 5 million put in more than 40 hours a week, including 1.4 million who worked more than 50 hours a week and 270,000 who put in more than 70 hours.

=== Other ===
- The Kapauku people of Papua think it is bad luck to work two consecutive days.
- The !Kung Bushmen work two-and-a-half days per week, rarely more than six hours per day.
- The work week in Samoa is approximately 30 hours.

== See also ==
- Annual leave
- Business day
- Critique of work
- Effects of overtime
- Four-day workweek
- Hours of Work (Commerce and Offices) Convention, 1930
- Hours of Work (Industry) Convention, 1919
- Hours of Work and Manning (Sea) Convention, 1936
- Human capital
- Karōshi
- Labour market flexibility
- Labor rights
- Occupational burnout
- Occupational stress
- Overwork
- Paid time off
- Refusal of work
- Right to rest and leisure
- Right to disconnect
- Saint Monday
- Short-time working
- Six-hour day
- Soviet calendar
- Sunday scaries
- Three-Day Week
- Universal basic income
- Wage slavery
- Waiting for the Weekend
- Weekly Rest (Commerce and Offices) Convention, 1957
- Weekly Rest (Industry) Convention, 1921
- Workism
- List of countries by average annual labor hours
