= Ladenschlussgesetz =

German federal law

In the Federal Republic of Germany, the Ladenschlussgesetz or "Shop Closing Law" (abbreviated: LadSchlG) is the federal "blue law" compelling retail stores to close to the public on Sundays and Christian holidays. The Ladenschlussgesetz in its current form was first enacted on 28 November 1956 following pressure from Germany's trade unions; in its last revision (of 2 June 2003), points of sale (Verkaufsstellen) must be closed at any of the following times:

1. On Sundays and public holidays;
2. On working days (Monday through Saturday) before 06:00 and after 20:00;
3. On 24 December before 06:00 and after 14:00 if that date falls on a working day

The law provides differing regulations for pharmacies, petrol stations, shops at train stations and airports, etc.

On 30 June 2006, as part of the Föderalismusreform ("Federalism Reform"), the regulatory responsibility for this area was devolved to the German states. Although the Federal law technically remains in force, this change means states are free to determine the opening hours of retail stores in their areas. All states – with the exception of the more conservative Bavaria and Saarland– have made use of that option.

== German states with varying shop opening hours ==
The states have each adopted individual regulations concerning opening hours on Sundays and public holidays. Some continue to observe the existing Federal rules, while others have liberalized them somewhat, although the general Federal ban concerning opening on Sundays and holidays remains in effect, owing to a provision in the German constitution recognizing Sunday as a day of rest and a corresponding decision of the Federal Constitutional Court (Bundesverfassungsgericht) on 9 June 2004.

=== States With 24/6 Schedule ===
(Shops may be open as desired at any hour (day or night) Monday through Saturday)

- Baden-Württemberg Effective date: 6 March 2007
- Berlin Effective date: 14 November 2006
- Brandenburg Effective date: 1 December 2006
- Bremen Effective date: 1 April 2007
- Hamburg Effective date: 1 January 2007
- Hesse Effective date: 1 December 2006
- Lower Saxony Effective date: 21 November 2006
- North Rhine-Westphalia Effective date: 21 November 2006
- Schleswig-Holstein Effective date: 1 December 2006

=== States With 24/5 Schedule ===
(Shops may be open as desired at any hour (day or night) Monday through Friday, with restrictions on Saturday opening hours)

- Mecklenburg-Western Pomerania Effective date: 2 July 2007

Shops may be open until 10 pm on Saturdays.

- Saxony-Anhalt Effective date: 30 November 2006 and
- Thuringia Effective date: 24 November 2006

Shops may be open until 8 pm on Saturdays; rules for Sundays and holidays follow the existing Federal law.

=== States With Other Schedule ===
- Rhineland-Palatinate Effective date: 29 November 2006 and
- Saxony Effective date: 1 April 2007

Shops may be open Monday through Saturday from 6 am to 10 pm each day.

=== (Existing) Federal shop-opening Schedule ===
- Bavaria
- Saarland (minor modifications concerning opening on Sundays and holidays)

== See also ==
- Shopping hours
- Public holidays in Germany
