= Occupational Cancer Convention, 1974 =

International Labour Organization Convention

C139
Occupational Cancer Convention
- Parties to the convention
- Type: Workplace safety standards
- Signed: 24 June 1974
- Location: Geneva
- Effective: 10 June 1976
- Condition: 2 ratifications
- Ratifiers: 41
- Depositary: Director-General of the International Labour Office
- Languages: French and English

Full text
- Occupational Cancer Convention at Wikisource

The Occupational Cancer Convention is an International Labour Organization Convention on workplace safety standards against occupational cancer, established in 1974 during the 59th session of the Interlnational Labour Conference. The convention entered into force in 1976 after ratification of Ecuador and Hungary.

== Ratifications ==
As of April 2023, the convention has been ratified by 41 countries.

Country	Date	Status
Afghanistan	16 May 1979	In Force
Argentina	15 Jun 1978	In Force
Belgium	11 Oct 1996	In Force
Brazil	27 Jun 1990	In Force
Croatia	08 Oct 1991	In Force
Czech Republic	01 Jan 1993	In Force
Denmark	06 Jun 1978	In Force
Ecuador	27 Mar 1975	In Force
Egypt	25 Mar 1982	In Force
Finland	4 May 1977	In Force
France	24 Aug 1994	In Force
Germany	23 Aug 1976	In Force
Guinea	20 Apr 1976	In Force
Guyana	10 Jan 1983	In Force
Hungary	10 Jun 1975	In Force
Iceland	21 Jun 1991	In Force
Iraq	31 Mar 1978	In Force
Italy	23 Jun 1981	In Force
Japan	26 Jul 1977	In Force
Lebanon	23 Feb 2000	In Force
Luxembourg	08 Apr 2008	In Force
Montenegro	03 Jun 2006	In Force
Netherlands	08 Jun 2017	In Force
Nicaragua	01 Oct 1981	In Force
North Macedonia	17 Nov 1991	In Force
Norway	14 Jun 1977	In Force
Peru	16 Nov 1976	In Force
Portugal	3 May 1999	In Force
South Korea	07 Nov 2011	In Force
Russian Federation	30 May 2017	In Force
Serbia	24 Nov 2000	In Force
Slovakia	01 Jan 1993	In Force
Slovenia	29 May 1992	In Force
Sweden	23 Sep 1975	In Force
Switzerland	28 Oct 1976	In Force
Syria	01 Feb 1979	In Force
Ukraine	17 Jun 2010	In Force
Uruguay	31 Jul 1980	In Force
Venezuela	05 Jul 1983	In Force
