= Chusmiza =

Miocene volcano in Chile

Coordinates: 19°41′2.14″S 69°11′17.81″W

Chusmiza complex (also known as Cerros de Sotoca) is a Miocene volcano in Chile. It is the largest stratovolcano of the Miocene epoch in the western Andean escarpment, with a volume of 400 cubic kilometres (96 cu mi). It is constructed from andesite. Potassium-argon dating has established an age of 11.3±0.3 mya.
