= Acquainted with the Night (book) =

Non-fiction book by Christopher Dewdney, 2004

Acquainted with the Night Excursions through the World After Dark
- Author: Christopher Dewdney
- Cover artist: Philippe Raimbault (photo)
- Language: English
- Subject: Night
- Genre: Non-fiction
- Published: 2004 HarperCollins
- Publication place: Canada
- Media type: Print (Hardcover, trade paperback)
- Pages: 302
- ISBN: 0-00-200639-1
- OCLC: 54460861
- Followed by: Soul of the World: Unlocking the Secrets of Time

Acquainted with the Night: Excursions through the World After Dark (or Acquainted with the Night: A Celebration of the Dark Hours) is a non-fiction book by Christopher Dewdney about various aspects of night. It was first published in 2004 by HarperCollins. It uses the same title as the Robert Frost poem "Acquainted with the Night". The book consists of 14 chapters, with one chapter dedicated to each hour of the night, from 6 pm to 5 am. Mini-essays populate each chapter which each follow a theme, like nocturnal creatures, dreams, astronomy, and mythology. Other subjects and topics touched upon include science, art, culture, natural history, superstitions, and psychology. The book was a finalist for the 2004 Governor General's Awards and for the 2005 Charles Taylor Prize. It tied with Dark Matter: Reading The Bones for the World Fantasy Award in Anthologies.

== Background ==
At the time of Acquainted with the Night's writing, author and poet Christopher Dewdney was 52 years old and living in Toronto with his wife, Barbara Gowdy. He had previously written 14 books, the last being the 2002 book of poetry, The Natural History. His previous non-fiction books were Last Flesh: Life in the Transhuman Era (1998) on the impacts of technological advances on humanism, The Secular Grail: Paradigms of Perception (1993) regarding the human psyche, and The Immaculate Perception (1986) on his views of consciousness, language and dreams. Dewdney's past books were described as being "more admired than read". On the topic of 'the night', he had a lifelong fascination with nightlife and eventually decided to write a book about it. He quickly became overwhelmed by the amount of information relating to the subject. For research, he consulted a variety of genres and formats, including books, journals, magazines, music, and movies, and collected information within the broad topics of art, science, social sciences and history. The perspective Dewdney took was that of "explaining night to beings from another planet that had two opposed suns and no night at all".

== Content ==
The content is divided into 14 chapters. The first chapter serves as an introduction and considers the mythological and geological origin of night. The next 12 chapters are each titled after an hour starting with chapter 2's 6 pm and ending with chapter 13's 5 am. Chapter 2 discusses the transition into night, including sunsets, the green flash, the stages of twilight, as well as Olbers' paradox, and a definition of the size and speed of night. The 7 pm chapter deals with nature at night, how animals see and hear differently at night with a focus on bats, nighthawks, and nocturnal insects. The 8 pm chapter analyzes children's literature and bedtime stories. The 9 pm chapter discusses aspects of the city at night, including the evolution of nightclubs, street lights, and the impacts of light pollution. The 10 pm chapter discusses night festivals around the world and throughout history. The 11 pm chapter explains the circadian rhythm and the physiology of sleep and dreams.

The attacks would almost always strike during the REM phase of the victim's first sleep cycle of the night... [One patient] who had survived several attacks said that, during each attack, something came into his bedroom, sat on his chest, and tried to crush the air out of his lungs. In one nightmare it was a cat, in another a dog, and once it was a woman.

— Dewdney on sudden unexplained death syndrome, Acquainted with the Night, pages 177–178.

The 12 am chapter traces the history behind dream interpretation from Gilgamesh to Sigmund Freud, Carl Jung, and Calvin Hall. Here, Dewdney considers nightmares and takes sudden unexplained death syndrome, whose sufferers are almost always Asian males, between 20 and 49 years old, as an extreme example of nightmares that cause the dreamer to die from a "ventricular fibrillation...brought about by extreme terror". The 1 am chapter compares literary and mythological personifications of, or beings associated with, the night. The 2 am chapter tells the stories of the legends behind the moon and the constellations. The 3 am chapter is all about insomnia. The 4 am chapter provides a geographical aspect, touring the places with long nights, like Las Vegas, caves, the poles, and deep within the oceans. The 5 am chapter discusses artistic representations of night, especially in music, on film and through paintings. The final chapter is a conclusion in which Dewdney reflects on memorable sunrises he has experienced and contrasts sunrises with sunsets.

== Style ==
The title shares its name with the Robert Frost poem "Acquainted with the Night," which is quoted on the first page. The book's structure uses twelve chapters, equating to twelve hours of night, from 6 pm to 5 am. Two additional chapters, "First Night" and "Night's Last Stand", bookend the twelve chapters as an introduction and conclusion. This hour-by-hour structure was used to move the narrative along logically while jumping between diverse topics. The topics range from such disparate subjects as culture, superstitions, natural history, physiology, and psychology so that reviewers variously called the book "a compendium", "a browser's book" and full of "encyclopedic mini-essays". Autobiographical passages are also included. One reviewer noted the format uses personal observations that lead to discussions of broad subjects with "side trips into relevant supporting materials".

The reviewer for the Quill & Quire cited the book as an example of a subgenre which an article in The Atlantic Monthly dubbed "mundane studies" referring to the ubiquity of the subject, like Mark Kurlansky's Salt: A World History and Witold Rybczynski's One Good Turn: A Natural History of the Screwdriver and the Screw. Dewdney's writing in Acquainted with the Night combines a poet's point of view with an interest for the sciences. The tone was described as "boyish enthusiasm" and "highly condensed yet personable voice". Gisèle Baxter, in the journal Canadian Literature, wrote that its tone was set at the beginning of the book by "an anecdote of a small boy creeping into the moonlit, partly wooded backyard of his family home".

== Publication and reception ==
Acquainted with the Night: Excursions through the World After Dark was published as a hardback in Canada by HarperCollins in May 2004. In the United States, Bloomsbury published the hardback version in July 2004 as Acquainted with the Night: A Celebration of the Dark Hours. The trade paperback version was published by HarperCollins in March 2005. An excerpt was published in the Canadian literary magazine Geist. The book was nominated for the 2005 Charles Taylor Prize, awarded to the best Canadian work of literary non-fiction, and Dewdney was a finalist in the English-language non-fiction category of the Governor General's Awards. The Library Journal noted the book would be "most useful for larger public libraries".

Regarding Dewdney's writing, the reviewer for Publishers Weekly wrote that Dewdney writes carefully and "confidently". Another reviewer called the book "engaging and recreational". Gisèle Baxter, in Canadian Literature, found his use of language "provok[es] consideration through its elegant turns of phrase and image" and Laura Wright, in Discover called the imagery "arresting". In The Globe and Mail, poet and novelist Margaret Atwood wrote, "The prose moves from the strictly informative to the lyrical to the charming to the amusing to the odd to the strangely moving without batting an eye." Another reviewer noted Dewdney "combined a deft lyric touch with a deep interest in science". The reviewer for Canadian Geographic wrote that "the strength of the book is in its artful mix of science and poetry". Literary critic Sven Birkerts found Dewdney to be "an engaging enough narrator and solid, enthusiastic stylist". The book's structure received mixed reviews, some reviewers found Dewdney was able to effectively transition between various topics while other reviewers did not. Birkerts wrote the book has "a fun-facts-fished-from-the-data-ocean...[and] end-of-term crammer" sense to it. The Quill & Quire and The Economist reviewers found the topics were too cursory, like "an encyclopedia entry". Birkerts concluded "that any one of Dewdney's excursions could earn its keep as a column in a popular science magazine" but assembled into one book the topics seemed random.
