= Workweek and weekend =

Parts of the week devoted to labor and rest, respectively

The weekdays and weekend are the complementary parts of the week, devoted to labour and rest, respectively. The legal weekdays (British English), or workweek (American English), is the part of the seven-day week devoted to working. In most of the world, the workweek is from Monday to Friday and the weekend is Saturday and Sunday. A weekday or workday is any day of the working week. Other institutions often follow this pattern, such as places of education. The constituted weekend has varying definitions, based on determined calendar days, designated period of time, and/or regional definition of the working week (e.g., commencing after 5:00 p.m. on Friday and lasting until 6:00 p.m. on Sunday). Sometimes the term "weekend" is expanded to include the time after work hours on the last workday of the week. Weekdays and workdays can be further detailed in terms of working time, the period of time that an individual spends at paid occupational labor.

In many Christian traditions, Sunday is the "day of rest and worship". The Jewish Shabbat or Biblical Sabbath lasts from sunset on Friday to the fall of full darkness on Saturday; as a result, the weekend in Israel is observed on Friday to Saturday. Some Muslim-majority countries historically instituted a Thursday–Friday weekend. Today, many of these countries, in the interests of furthering business trade and cooperation, have shifted to Friday–Saturday or Saturday–Sunday.

The Christian day of worship is just one day each week, but the preceding day (the Jewish Sabbath) came to be taken as a holiday as well in the 20th century. This shift has been accompanied by a reduction in the total number of hours worked per week. The present-day concept of the "weekend" first arose in the industrial north of Britain in the early 19th century. A day off is a non-working day, not necessarily on weekends.

Some countries have adopted a six-day workweek and one-day weekend (6×1), which can be Friday only (in Djibouti, Iran, Somalia and Libya), Saturday only (formerly in Nepal), or Sunday only (in Mexico, Colombia, Uganda, Eritrea, India, Philippines, and Equatorial Guinea). However, most countries have adopted a five-day workweek and two-day weekend (5×2), whose days differ according to religious tradition: Friday and Saturday (in 17 Muslim countries and Israel); Saturday and Sunday (most of the countries); or Friday and Sunday (in Brunei Darussalam; Aceh, Indonesia; and Sarawak, Malaysia), with the previous evening post-work often considered part of the weekend. Proposals continue to be put forward to reduce the number of days or hours worked per week, such as the four-day workweek, on the basis of predicted social and economic benefits.

== History ==
World map showing the days of the work week by country: Monday – Friday Monday – Saturday Sunday – Thursday Sunday – Friday Saturday – Thursday Monday – Thursday and Saturday Mixed

A continuous seven-day cycle that runs throughout history, paying no attention whatsoever to the phases of the moon and having a fixed day of rest, was most likely first practised in Judaism, dated to the 6th century BC at the latest.

In Ancient Rome (753 BC–476 AD), every eight days there was a nundinae. It was a market day, during which children were exempted from school and agricultural workers stopped work in the field and came to the city to sell the produce of their labor or to practice religious rites.

During the Han dynasty of imperial China, officials had a day off once every five days known as hsui-mu （休沐）. This rest day was known as "a day for rest and for washing one's hair".

In cultures with a four-day workweek, the three Sabbaths derive from the culture's main religious tradition: Friday (Muslim), Saturday (Jewish), and Sunday (Christian).

In the 890s, the Abbasid Caliphate instituted a 5 day work week for bureaucrats and other government employees. Tuesday was added to the preexisting day off of Friday. This was done as a cost saving measure, since these days off were unpaid.

The French Revolutionary Calendar (1793–1805) had ten-day weeks (called décades) and allowed décadi, one out of the 10 days, as a leisure day. From 1929 to 1940, the Soviet Union utilized a calendar with five and six-day work weeks, with a rest day assigned to a worker either with a colour or number.

The present-day concept of the relatively longer "week-end" first arose in the industrial north of Britain in the early 19th century and was originally a voluntary arrangement between factory owners and workers allowing Saturday afternoon off starting at two pm on the basis that staff would be available for work sober and refreshed on Monday morning. The Oxford English Dictionary traces the first use of the term "weekend" to the British magazine Notes and Queries in 1879.

In 1884, the Federation of Organized Trades and Labor Unions, a predecessor of the AFL-CIO created mid-twentieth century, called for all workers to have eight-hour days by May 1, 1886, playing a crucial role in the push for a five-day workweek. In 1908, the first five-day workweek in the United States was instituted by a New England cotton mill so that Jewish workers would not have to work on the Sabbath from sundown Friday to sundown Saturday. In 1926, Henry Ford began shutting down his automotive factories for all of Saturday and Sunday, realizing that by giving workers more time off it would encourage more leisure activities such as vacations and shopping. In 1929, the Amalgamated Clothing Workers of America was the first union to demand and receive a five-day workweek. The rest of the United States slowly followed, but it was not until 1940, when a provision of the 1938 Fair Labor Standards Act mandating a maximum 40-hour workweek went into effect, that the two-day weekend was adopted nationwide.

Over the succeeding decades, particularly in the 1940s to 1960s, an increasing number of countries adopted either a Friday–Saturday or a Saturday–Sunday weekend to harmonize with international markets. A series of workweek reforms in the mid-to-late 2000s and early 2010s brought much of the Arab world in synchronization with the majority of countries around the world, in terms of working hours, the length of the workweek, and the days of the weekend. The International Labour Organization (ILO) currently defines a workweek exceeding 48 hours as excessive. A 2007 study by the ILO found that at least 614.2 million people around the world were working excessive hours.

== Length ==
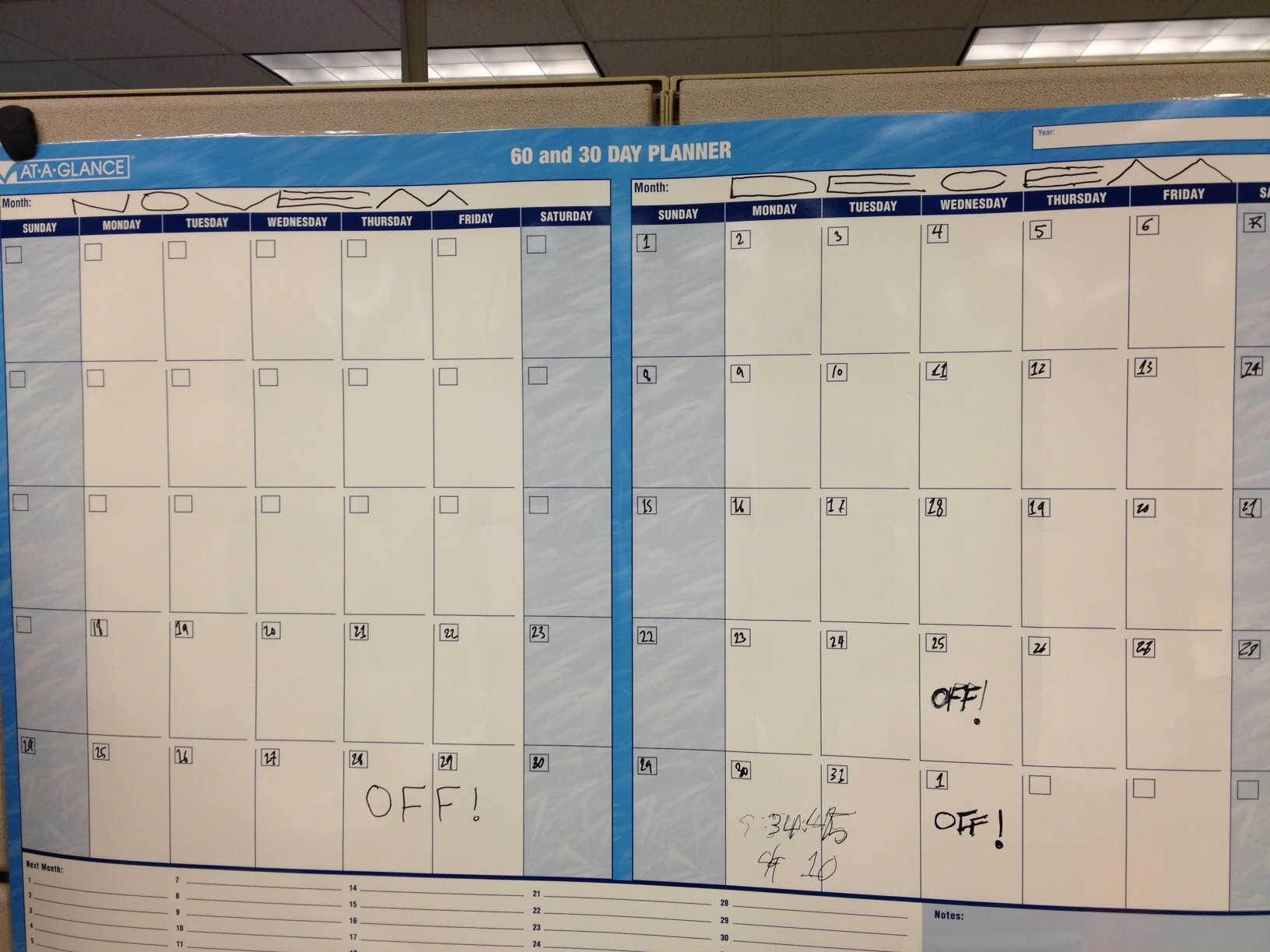
This day planner chart (which can be used for any months) shows the workweek days as white boxes and the weekend days as light blue-coloured boxes.

Actual workweek lengths have been falling in the developed world. In the United States, the workweek length decreased slowly from before the Civil War to the start of the 20th century. There was a rapid reduction between 1900 and 1920, especially between 1913 and 1919, when weekly hours fell by about eight percent. In 1926, Henry Ford standardized on a five-day workweek, instead of the prevalent six days, without reducing employees' pay. Hours worked stabilized at about 49 per week during the 1920s, and during the Great Depression fell below 40. During the Depression, President Herbert Hoover called for a reduction in work hours in lieu of layoffs. Later, President Franklin Roosevelt signed the Fair Labor Standards Act of 1938, which established a five-day, 40-hour workweek for many workers. The proportion of people working very long weeks has since risen, and the full-time employment of women has increased dramatically.

The New Economics Foundation has recommended moving to a 21-hour standard workweek to address problems with unemployment, high carbon emissions, low well-being, entrenched inequalities, overworking, family care, and the general lack of free time. The Center for Economic and Policy Research states that reducing the length of the work week would slow climate change and have other environmental benefits. A study from the University of Massachusetts concluded that a full day taken off the workweek would cut humanity's carbon footprint by nearly 30%. After working 25 hours in a week, research has shown that cognitive performance decreases and fatigue and stress increases.

In the 21st century, those such as Anna Coote, the head of social policy at the New Economics Foundation and British sociologist Peter Fleming, among others, have proposed the introduction of a three-day workweek. The arguments for its introduction include a better work-life balance, more family time, improved health and well-being, greater sustainability (such as via reduced carbon emissions), increased work productivity, and a reduction of overwork, unemployment and over-consumption.

== By country ==
=== Summary ===
Table: Hours per week and per day by nation or territory
Nation or territory	Typical hours worked per week	Working week	Typical hours worked per day
Afghanistan	48	Sunday–Thursday	8
Albania	40	Monday–Friday	8
Algeria	40	Sunday–Thursday	8
Angola	40	Monday–Friday	8
Argentina	40	Monday–Friday	8
Armenia	45	Monday–Friday	9
Azerbaijan	40	Monday–Friday	8
Austria	40	Monday–Friday	8
Australia	38	Monday–Friday	7.6
Bahrain	40	Sunday–Thursday	8 (6 during Ramadan for Muslim employees)
Bangladesh	40	Sunday–Thursday	8
Benin	40	Monday–Friday	8
Belarus	40	Monday–Friday	8
Belgium	38	Monday–Friday	7.6
Bolivia	40–48	Monday–Saturday	8 (many people work on Saturday either a half-day or full-day)
Brazil	44	Monday–Friday	8.5
Brunei	40	Monday–Thursday and Saturday	8
Burundi	50	Monday–Friday	10
Bulgaria	40	Monday–Friday	8
Canada	40	Monday–Friday	8
Cambodia	40	Monday–Friday	8
Cameroon	50	Monday–Friday	10
Chile	45	Monday–Friday	9
People's Republic of China	42	Monday–Friday	8
Congo, Democratic Republic of	40	Monday–Friday	8
Côte d'Ivoire	40	Monday–Friday	8
Croatia	40	Monday–Friday	8
Colombia	48	Monday–Friday / Monday–Saturday	8 or 10
Costa Rica	48	Monday–Friday	8
Czechia	40	Monday–Friday	8
Denmark	37	Monday–Friday	7.4
Djibouti	40	Saturday–Thursday	6.7
Dominican Republic	40	Monday–Friday	8
Egypt	40	Sunday–Thursday	8
Equatorial Guinea	48	Monday–Saturday	8
Ethiopia	40	Monday–Friday	8
Estonia	40	Monday–Friday	8
Eswatini	40	Monday–Friday	8
Finland	38	Monday–Friday	7.6
France	35	Monday–Friday	7
Gabon	40	Monday–Friday	8
Gambia	40	Monday–Friday	8
Germany	38.5	Monday–Friday	8
Ghana	40	Monday–Friday	8
Greece	48	Monday–Saturday	8
Honduras	44	Monday–Saturday	8 (many people work on Saturday half-day)
Hungary	40	Monday–Friday	8
Hong Kong	40–48	Monday–Saturday	8 (many people work on Saturday either a half-day or full-day)
India	48–66	Monday–Saturday (some institutions work on alternate Saturdays)	10 (many people work on Saturday either half-day or full-day)
Indonesia	40–48	Monday–Friday (exception of Aceh); Monday–Thursday and Saturday (Aceh)	8, many people work a 6-day week with 7-hour days.
Iran	44	Saturday–Thursday	8 (many people work on Thursday half-day)
Iraq	40	Sunday–Thursday	8
Ireland	40	Monday–Friday	8
Israel	42	Sunday–Thursday	8.4
Italy	40	Monday–Friday	8
Japan	40	Monday–Friday	8
Jordan	45	Sunday–Thursday	9
Kazakhstan	40	Monday–Friday	8
Kuwait	35 (25 during Ramadan)	Sunday–Thursday	7 (5 during Ramadan)
Kenya	40	Monday–Friday	8
Laos	40	Monday–Friday	8
Latvia	40	Monday–Friday	8
Lebanon	40	Monday–Friday	8, Most of the people have a six-day workweek, with Saturday as a partial workday.
Lesotho	40	Monday–Friday	8
Libya	40	Sunday–Thursday	8
Lithuania	40	Monday–Friday	8
Luxembourg	40	Monday–Friday	8
Madagascar	40	Monday–Friday	8
Maldives	40	Sunday–Thursday	8
Malawi	40	Monday–Friday	8
Mali	40	Monday–Friday	8
Malta	40	Monday–Friday	8
Mauritania	40	Monday–Friday	8
Malaysia	44	Sunday–Thursday (Johor (until 1 January 2025), Kedah, Kelantan, Terengganu); Monday–Friday (Other states)	8 (except Sarawak)
Mexico	48	Monday–Saturday	8
Mongolia	40	Monday–Friday	8
Morocco	44	Monday–Friday	8
Mozambique	40	Monday–Friday	8
Myanmar	40	Monday–Friday	8
Nepal	42 (until April 2026), 48 (current)	Sunday–Friday (until April 2026) Monday-Friday (current)	7 (5 on Friday and 6 in Winter) (formerly), now 8 (6 on Fridays and 7 in Winter)
Netherlands	40	Monday–Friday	8
New Zealand	40	Monday–Friday	8
Nigeria	40	Monday–Friday	8
North Korea	48	Monday–Saturday	8
North Macedonia	40	Monday–Saturday	8
Norway	37.5	Monday–Friday	7.5
Oman	40 (30 during Ramadan)	Sunday–Thursday	8 (6 during Ramadan)
Pakistan	54	Monday–Saturday	9 (including 1 hour lunch and prayer break).
Palestine	45	Saturday–Thursday	8
Philippines	45–54	Monday–Saturday	9 (including 1 hour lunch break)
Poland	40	Monday–Friday	8
Portugal	40	Monday–Friday	8
Qatar	40 (25 during Ramadan)	Sunday–Thursday	8 (5 during Ramadan) (Line staff work 48 hours of the week, Saturday–Thursday)
Romania	40	Monday–Friday	8
Russia	40	Monday–Friday	8
Rwanda	40	Monday–Friday	8
Saudi Arabia	40–48 (and 30–36 during Ramadan)	Sunday–Thursday	8 (6 during Ramadan)
Senegal	40	Monday–Friday	8
Serbia	40	Monday–Friday	8 (including a half-hour lunch break)
Singapore	44	Monday–Friday	9
Slovakia	40	Monday–Friday	8
Spain	40	Monday–Friday	8
Sri Lanka	40	Monday–Friday	8
South Africa	40	Monday–Friday	8
South Korea	40	Monday–Friday	8
Somalia	45	Saturday–Thursday	8
Sudan	40	Sunday–Thursday	8
Suriname	39.5	Monday–Friday	8; Monday–Thursday 7:00 – 15:00 / Friday 7:00 – 14.30
Sweden	40	Monday–Friday	8
Switzerland	41	Monday–Friday	8.2
Syria	40	Sunday–Thursday	8
Seychelles	40	Monday–Friday	8
Taiwan	40	Monday–Friday	8; The Labor Standards Act stipulates that a worker shall have one mandatory day off and one flexible rest day in every seven days. See One fixed day off and one flexible rest day policy.
Tanzania	40	Monday–Friday	9
Togo	40	Monday–Friday	8
Thailand	40	Monday–Friday	8
Trinidad and Tobago	40	Monday–Friday	8
Tunisia	40	Monday–Friday	8
Turkey	45	Monday–Friday	9
Ukraine	40	Monday–Friday	8
United Arab Emirates	40–48 (30–36 during Ramadan)	Monday–Friday; Monday–Thursday (Local government and private schools in Sharjah)	8 to 9 (regular hours minus 2 hours during Ramadan for all employees); Federal and local government agencies and schools work Monday to Thursday with half-days on Fridays, except for local government employees and private schools in Sharjah, which operate only Monday to Thursday. Private companies determine their own workweeks; some allow employees to follow the local public sector workweek as long as they compensate for lost hours during the workweek.
United Kingdom	37.5	Monday–Friday	7.5
United States	40	Monday–Friday	8
Uganda	48	Monday–Saturday	8
Uzbekistan	40	Monday–Friday / Monday–Saturday	8
Venezuela	40	Monday–Friday	8
Vietnam	40	Monday–Friday	8
Yemen	40	Sunday–Thursday	8
Zambia	40	Monday–Friday	8
Zimbabwe	40	Monday–Friday	8; Most people work half a day on Saturday

=== Africa ===
==== Ethiopia ====
The official government working week is Monday to Friday; 8 hours per day, except Friday which is 7 hours, and 39 hours in total per week. Official work hours run from 08:30 am to 05:30pm with one hour for lunch from 12:30pm to 01:30pm. On Friday, lunch hour runs from 2:00 pm to 6:00 to allow Muslims to attend Friday prayers. Saturday and Sunday are public holidays. Private sector employees often follow a different schedule, working on Saturdays.

==== Morocco ====
Despite being an Islamic country, Morocco does not follow the workweek conventions implemented in many Middle Eastern countries. The standard workweek in Morocco is from Monday to Friday, with Saturday and Sunday being public holidays.

==== South Africa ====
In South Africa, the working week traditionally was Monday to Friday with a half-day on Saturday and Sunday a public holiday. However, since 2013 there have been changes to the working week concept based on more than one variation. The week can be five days of work, or more. The maximum number of hours someone can work in a week remains 45.

==== Tunisia ====
Despite being an Islamic country, Tunisia does not follow the workweek conventions implemented in many Middle Eastern countries. The standard workweek in Tunisia is from Monday to Friday, with Saturday and Sunday being public holidays.

=== Americas ===
==== Brazil ====
As a general rule, Brazil adopts a 44-hour working week, which typically begins on Monday and ends on Friday, with a Saturday–Sunday weekend. Brazilian Law, however, also allows for shorter Monday-to-Friday working hours so employees can work on Saturdays or Sundays, as long as the weekly 44-hour limit is respected, and the employee gets at least one weekend day. This is usually the case for malls, supermarkets and shops. The law also grants labor unions the right to negotiate different work weeks, within certain limits, which then become binding for that union's labor category. Overtime is allowed, limited to two extra hours a day, with an increase in pay.

==== Chile ====
The working week in Chile averages 45 hours, most often worked on a Monday–Friday schedule, but is not uncommon to work on Saturdays. Retail businesses mostly operate Monday to Saturday, with larger establishments being open seven days a week.

==== Colombia ====
As of July 2025, Colombia has a 44-hour working week. Depending on the business, people work five days for a maximum of 8 hours per day, typically Monday to Friday, or six days for eight hours a day, Monday to Saturday. In 2021, the Government enacted a law that reduces the weekly working hours from 48 to 42, which will take effect gradually between 2023 and 2026.

==== Mexico ====
Mexico officially has a 48-hour workweek (8 hours × 6 days) running from Monday to Saturday, although it is uncommon in most industries to consistently work six full days per week. It is the custom in many industries and trades to work a half-day on Saturdays. Most public employees have a five-day workweek running from Monday to Friday, and many white-collar businesses use this schedule as well. Shops and retailers remain open on Saturday and Sunday in most large cities.

==== United States ====
Since the early to mid-20th century the working week in the United States traditionally begins on Monday and ends on Friday, 40 hours per week, with Saturday and Sunday being weekend days. However, in practice, only 42% of employees work 40-hour weeks. The average workweek for full-time employees is 47 hours. Retail stores and restaurants are generally also open for business on Saturday and often on Sunday as well. Increasingly, employers are offering compressed work schedules to employees. Some government and corporate employees now work a 9/80 work schedule (80 hours over 9 days during a two-week period)—commonly 9-hour days Monday to Thursday, 8 hours on one Friday, and off the following Friday. Some government or corporate employees work a 10/40 schedule—10 hours per day over 4 days, usually with Fridays off. Jobs in healthcare, law enforcement, transportation, retail, and other service positions commonly require employees to work on the weekend or to do shift work.

=== Asia and Oceania ===
==== Australia ====
A five-day, 40-hour week was introduced nationally from 1 January 1948 following a ruling of the Commonwealth Court of Conciliation and Arbitration. A 44-hour week, usually taken as a half-day on Saturday, had been applied for some industries from 1927 following a ruling by the court in a case brought by the Amalgamated Engineering Union. The ruling "led to a gradual and more general reduction of hours across industries", culminating in a nationwide 44-hour week in 1939.

In Australia the working week begins on Monday and terminates on Friday. A 38 hour week has been the norm since the 1980s. Some people work overtime with extra pay on offer for those that do, especially for weekend work. Shops open seven days a week in most states with opening hours from 9am to 5:30 pm on weekdays, with some states having two "late night trading" nights on Thursday and Friday, when trading ceases at 9pm. Many supermarkets and low-end department stores remain open until midnight and some trade continually, without closing. Restaurants and cinemas can open at all hours, save for some public holidays. Bars generally trade seven days a week but there are local municipal restrictions concerning trading hours. Banks trade from Monday to Friday, with some branches opening on Saturdays (and in some cases Sundays) in high demand areas. The Post Office (Australia Post) trades Monday to Friday as per retail shops but some retail post offices may trade on Saturdays and Sundays in some shopping centers. A notable exception to the above is Western Australia whereby retail establishments are restricted to trading between the hours of 11am-5pm on Sundays.

==== China ====
In China, there is a five-day Monday–Friday working week, prior to which work on Saturday was standard. China began the two-day Saturday–Sunday weekend on May 1, 1995. Most government employees work 5 days a week (including officials and industrial management). Most manufacturing facilities operate on Saturdays as well. However, most shops, museums, cinemas, and commercial establishments open on Saturdays, Sundays, and holidays. Banks are also open throughout the weekend and on most public holidays. In primary and secondary schools, before 1995, schools generally timetabled classes from Mondays to Saturdays, although in the 1990s some schools began to shift to a half-day on Saturday, or alternating between five- and six-day weeks. A government-mandated shift from 6-day (or 5 and a half day) weeks to 5-day weeks as standard took effect on 1 September 1995, although some high schools continue to have non-standard timetabling practices to this day.

Public holidays in China are all set on fixed days of the Gregorian or Chinese calendar, rather than a particular Monday or Friday as is the norm in some other countries. As a result, it is rare that a public holiday would naturally create a long weekend. As a result, around the time of public holidays, the government often shifts weekend rest days into weekdays to create longer continuous periods of rest. Swapped weekends are common between the actual holiday and the weekend, so three-day or seven-day holiday periods are created. The nearby Saturday or Sunday may be changed to a normal working day. For example, if the actual holiday falls on a Tuesday, the Monday may be swapped as a holiday, and citizens are required to work on the previous Saturday instead, creating a three-day long weekend (Sunday to Tuesday) but a six-day work week (Monday to Saturday) in the previous week. The weekend-shifting arrangements are ad hoc from year to year and are announced by the government towards the end of each year for the next year.

A number of provinces and municipalities across China, including Hebei, Jiangxi and Chongqing, have issued new policies, calling on companies to create 2.5-day weekends. Under the plan, government institutions, state-owned companies, joint-ventures and privately held companies are to be given incentives to allow their workers to take off at noon on Friday before coming back to the office on Monday.

==== Hong Kong ====
In Hong Kong, a typical working week for local enterprises begins on 9am on Monday and ends at 1pm on Saturday, although most employees have alternate Saturdays off. After the introduction of the five-day working week for the majority of government departments in 2006, most multinational enterprises and large local companies followed suit, extended the working day from 9am to 5pm so as to adopt a five-day work week. Despite the aforementioned official hours, and many employees still work overtime, and in the case of the financial, service and artist industry in particular, working 12-hour days on a chronic basis is still not uncommon.

Most commercial establishments in the retail sector such as restaurants, shops and cinemas, as well as public venues such as museums and libraries are open on Saturdays, Sundays and most public holidays. For schools, lessons are not normally held on Saturdays, but students may be required to go to school on Saturdays for extra-curricular activities or make-up classes.

==== India ====
The standard working week for most office jobs begins on Monday and ends on Saturday. The work schedule is 48 hours per week, Sunday being a rest day. However, most government offices and the software industry follow a five-day workweek from Monday to Friday. All major industries along with services like transport, hospitality, healthcare etc. work in shifts.

Central government offices follow a five-day week. State governments follow half-day working on the first and third Saturdays of each month and rest on the second and fourth Saturdays, except West Bengal, Rajasthan, Bihar, Punjab, Delhi, Tamil Nadu, and Maharashtra government which follows a Monday–Friday workweek. There is usually no half working day in the private sector, and people work in two or three shifts of 8 hours each.

Most schools follow a six-day workweek from Monday to Saturday with the second and fourth Saturdays off. Banks have second and fourth Saturdays off as well in India effective from 1 September 2015.

==== Iran ====
The standard working week in Iran begins on Saturday and ends on Thursday. Thursdays are usually half-day working days. Many private enterprises which operate on an 8 to 5 basis take Thursdays off for a two-day Thursday-Friday weekend. These variations allow employers flexibility in choosing working hours so that the legal requirement of working for 44 hours per week is met. However, shopping places are usually open for business on Friday as well. In 2015, President Hasan Rouhani recognized Saturday as the sabbath for the country's very small Jewish minority, allowing Jewish adults to stay home from work and students to stay home from school.

==== Israel ====
In Israel, the standard workweek is 42 hours as prescribed by law. The typical workweek is five days, Sunday to Thursday, with 8.4 hours a day as the standard, with anything beyond that considered overtime. A minority of jobs operate on a partial six-day Sunday–Friday workweek. Many Israelis work overtime hours, with a maximum of 12 overtime hours a week permitted by law. Most offices and businesses run on a five-day week, though many stores, post offices, banks, and schools are open and public transportation runs six days a week. Almost all businesses are closed during Saturday, and most public services except for emergency services, including almost all public transport, are unavailable on Saturdays. However, some shops, restaurants, cafes, places of entertainment, and factories are open on Saturdays, and a few bus and share taxi lines are active. Employees who work Saturdays, particularly service industry workers, public sector workers, and pilots, are compensated with alternative days off. In 2014, the average workweek was 45.8 hours for men and 37.1 hours for women.

==== Japan ====
The standard business office working week in Japan begins on Monday and ends on Friday, 40 hours per week. This system became common between 1980 and 2000. Before then, most workers in Japan worked full-time from Monday to Friday and a half day on Saturday, 45 to 48 hours per week. Public schools and facilities (excluding city offices) are generally open on Saturdays for half a day. It remains common for construction workers, particularly house-builders, to work six days per week, though some efforts have been made to introduce five-day work weeks to attract younger workers.

==== Lebanon ====
The working week is Monday to Friday; 8 hours per day, 40 hours in total per week. Some institutions, however, also work 4 hours on Saturdays. Large malls are open on Saturday and Sunday; many small shops close on Sunday.

==== Malaysia ====
Most Malaysian states have a Monday to Friday working week, with lunch breaks usually from 12:15pm–2:45pm on Fridays to allow Muslims to perform their prayers. The states of Kedah, Kelantan, and Terengganu follow a Sunday to Thursday working week.

Johor previously officially had a Friday-Saturday weekend, even as many companies in the private sector observed a Saturday-Sunday weekend. Starting from 1 January 2025, the state officially switched to a Saturday-Sunday weekend, bringing it in line with most of the other states as well as neighbouring Singapore.

==== Mongolia ====
Mongolia has a Monday to Friday working week, with a normal maximum time of 40 hours. Most shops are also open on weekends, many large retail chains having full opening hours even on Sunday. Private enterprises conduct business from 9:00 to 18:00, and government institutions may have full working hours.

==== Nepal ====
Nepal follows the Nepal Sambat (NS) calendar, which has the resting day on Saturdays and the working days of the week on Sundays to Fridays. Workweek starts on Sunday and ends on Friday. Schools in Nepal are off on Saturdays, so it is common for pupils to go to school from Sunday to Friday.

In November 2012, the home ministry proposed a two-day holiday per week plan for all government offices except at those providing essential services like electricity, water, and telecommunications. This proposal followed a previous proposal by the Nepali government, i.e. Load-shedding Reduction Work Plan 2069 BS, for a five working day plan for government offices as part of efforts to address the problem of load-shedding. The proposal has been discussed in the Administration Committee; it is not yet clear whether the plan includes private offices and educational institutions.

Starting April 6, 2026, Nepal shifted the workweek from Sunday-Friday to Monday-Friday due to the fuel crisis, saving costs and maintaining efficiency.

==== New Zealand ====
In New Zealand, the working week is typically Monday to Friday 8:30 to 17:00, but it is not uncommon for many industries (especially construction) to work a half day on Saturday, normally from 8:00 or 9:00 to about 13:00. Supermarkets, malls, independent retailers, and increasingly, banks, remain open seven days a week.

==== Philippines ====
In the Philippines, Article 91 of the Labor Code requires at least one rest day for workers in a week; the choice of selecting the rest day is left to the employer, subject to collective bargaining. Most workers avail of Sunday as their mandated rest day. However, government offices, banks, and many non-service industry establishments maintain a five-day (Monday to Friday) work week.

==== Singapore ====
In Singapore the common working week is 5-day work week, which runs from Monday to Friday beginning 8:30 a.m. and end at 5 p.m. – 6 p.m. Some companies work a half day on Saturdays. Shops, supermarkets and shopping centres are open seven days a week and on most public holidays. 'Foreign workers', for example domestic helpers and construction workers (typically from the Philippines and India, respectively), usually work 6 days per week, having Sunday as their only day off. In 2024, the average work week is 41.6 hours long.

==== South Korea ====
In South Korea, the maximum working hours per week is 40 hours for employees but can be extended by at most 12 hours for overtime. In March 2023, there was a proposal to increase the workweek to 69 hours but was overturned.

==== Thailand ====
In Thailand the working week is Monday to Friday for a maximum of 44 to 48 hours per week (Saturday can be a half or full day).

However, government offices and some private companies have modernised through enacting the American and European standard of working Monday to Friday.

==== Vietnam ====
Vietnam has a standard 48-hour six-day workweek. Monday to Friday are full workdays and Saturday is a partial day. Work typically begins at 8:00 am and lasts until 5:00 pm from Monday to Friday and until 12 noon on Saturdays. This includes a one-hour lunch break. Government offices and banks follow a five-day workweek from Monday to Friday.

=== Europe ===
In Europe, the standard full-time working week begins on Monday and ends on Friday. Most retail shops are open for business on Saturday. In Ireland, Italy, Finland, Sweden, the Netherlands and the former socialist states of Europe, large shopping centres open on Sunday. In European countries such as Germany, there are laws regulating shop hours. With exceptions, shops must be closed on Sundays and from midnight until the early morning of every day.

==== Austria ====
The working week is Monday to Friday 8 hours per day. Shops are open on Saturday. By law, almost no shop is open on Sunday. However, exceptions have been made, for example for bakeries, petrol stations and shops at railway stations, especially in the largest cities (Vienna, Graz, Salzburg, Linz).

==== Belarus ====
The working week is Monday to Friday. Working time must not exceed 8 hours per day and 40 hours per week (on average, annualised).

==== Belgium ====
The working week is Monday to Friday. Working time must not exceed 8 hours per day and 38 hours per week (on average, annualised). Very few shops are open on Sunday.

==== Bulgaria ====
The working week is Monday to Friday, eight hours per day, forty hours per week. Most pharmacies, shops, bars, cafés, and restaurants will operate on Saturdays and Sundays.

==== Croatia ====
The working week is Monday to Friday, seven and a half hours per day (+ 30 minutes lunch break), 37.5 hours per week (or 40 hours per week if lunch breaks are included as working hours). Most pharmacies, shops, bars, cafés, and restaurants are open on Saturday and Sunday.

==== Czech Republic ====
Full-time employment is usually Monday to Friday, eight hours per day and forty hours per week. Many shops and restaurants are open on Saturday and Sunday, but employees still usually work forty hours per week.

==== Denmark ====
Denmark has an official 37-hour working week, with primary work hours between 6:00 and 18:00, Monday to Friday. In public institutions, a 30-minute lunch break every day is included as per collective agreements, so that the actual required working time is 34.5 hours. In private companies, the 30-minute lunch break is normally not included. The workday is usually 7.5 hours Monday to Thursday and 7 hours on Friday. Some small shops are closed Monday.

==== Estonia ====
In Estonia, the working week begins on Monday and ends on Friday. Usually a working week is forty hours. Most pharmacies, shops, bars, cafés, and restaurants will operate on Saturdays and Sundays. Over a seven-day period, the employee may work a maximum of 48 hours on average but in agreement with the employee and provided that the agreement is not unfair, the employee may work an average of 52 hours over a seven-day period. If the employee works more than the time agreed upon, it is overtime, summarized overtime is calculated at the end of the calculation period and is compensated with paid time off or at a rate of 1.5 times the wages.

==== Finland ====
In Finland, the working week begins on Monday and ends on Friday. A full-time job is defined by law as being at least 32 and at most forty hours per week. In retail and restaurant occupations, among others, the weekly hours may be calculated as an average over three to ten weeks, depending on the employment contract. Banks and bureaus are closed on weekends. Most shops are open on Saturdays, while some are closed on Sundays.

==== France ====
The standard working week is Monday to Friday, for a regulatory maximum of 35 hours' work per week (above which overtime is paid). Shops are also open on Saturday. Small shops may close on a weekday (generally Monday) to compensate workers for having worked on Saturday. By law, préfets may authorise a small number of specific shops to open on Sunday such as bars, cafés, restaurants, and bakeries, which are traditionally open every day but only during the morning on Sunday. Workers are not obliged to work on Sunday. School children have traditionally taken Wednesday off, or had only a half day, making up the time either with longer days for the rest of the week or sometimes a half day on Saturday. This practice was made much less common under new legislation rolled out over 2013 to 2014.

==== Germany ====
In most jobs, the working week is Monday to Friday, 8 hours per day; many people leave work earlier on Fridays however. Legally, Saturday counts as a workday (Werktag), this is relevant because many regulations have different rules for workdays versus Sundays/holidays, such as in labor law.

Opening times of shops are regulated by law (Ladenschlussgesetz). Shops are allowed to open from Monday to Saturday, and most open on Saturday. On Sunday, shops are generally not allowed to open. Some exceptions are made: bakeries, flower shops and newsagents may open for a few hours. Also, shops selling mainly to travellers may remain open, such as shops in train stations and airports, and petrol stations.

Restaurants, including those which only sell take-out food, are not counted as shops, and are allowed to open on Sunday.

==== Greece ====
The standard working week is Monday to Friday. State jobs are from 07:00 until 15:00. Shops are open generally Mondays to Fridays from 09:00–21:00 and then from Saturdays generally 09:00-20:00. It is very rare for a shop to open on Sunday but from May to October shops at tourist attractions can open from 11:00 to 20:00.

==== Hungary ====
In Hungary, the working week begins on Monday and ends on Friday. Full-time employment is usually considered forty hours per week. For office workers, the work day usually begins between 8 and 9 o'clock and ends between 16:00 and 18:00, depending on the contract and lunch time agreements.

The forty-hour workweek of public servants includes lunch time. Their work schedule typically consists of 8.5 hours between Monday and Thursday (from 8:00 to 16:30) and 6 hours on Fridays (8:00–14:00).

==== Ireland ====
Ireland has a working week from Monday to Friday, with core working hours from 09:00 to 17:30. Retail stores are usually open until 21:00 every Thursday. Many grocery stores, especially in urban areas, are open until 21:00 or later, and some supermarkets and convenience stores may open around the clock. Shops are generally open all day Saturday and a shorter day Sunday (usually 10:00–12:00 to 17:00–19:00).

==== Italy ====
In Italy the 40-hour rule applies: Monday to Friday, 09:00 to 18:00, with a one-hour break for lunch. Sunday is always a holiday; Saturday is usually a free day as well, with the common exception of most high schools, where the students' roster covers 6 days a week, albeit limiting to the morning.

In the past, shops had a break from 13:00 to 16:00 and they were generally open until 19:00/20:00. Working times for shops have been changed recently and now are at the owner's discretion; malls are generally open every day 08.00-09:00 to 20:00.

==== Latvia ====
Latvia has a Monday to Friday working week capped at forty hours. Shops are mostly open on weekends, many large retail chains having full working hours even on Saturday and Sunday. Private enterprises usually hold hours from 9:00 to 18:00, however government institutions and others may have a shorter working day, ending at 17:00.

==== Lithuania ====
Lithuania has a Monday to Friday working week capped at forty hours. Shops are mostly open on weekends, many large retail chains having full working hours even on Sunday and public holidays (however on Christmas or Easter shops usually shortens the work time). Private enterprises usually hold hours from 9:00 to 18:00, however government institutions and others may have a shorter working day, ending at 17:00 or 16:00.

==== Luxembourg ====
The standard working week in Luxembourg is 40 hours per week with 8 hours per day. Monday to Friday is the standard working week, though many shops and businesses open on Saturdays (though for somewhat restricted hours). Trading on Sundays is extremely restricted and generally limited to grocery stores opening on Sunday mornings. However, shops are allowed to open in Luxembourg City during the first Sunday of the month, as well as in Luxembourg City and other larger towns on weekends towards the end of the year (Christmas shopping season). A few shopping malls located in the north of the country and in border towns (e.g. KNAUF, MASSEN and Pall Center Pommerloch) are also allowed to open almost every day of the year.

==== Netherlands ====
In the Netherlands, the standard working week is Monday to Friday (36–40 hours). Shops are almost always open on Saturdays and often on Sundays, depending on the location. On Monday mornings, shops often do not open until around noon.

==== North Macedonia ====
In North Macedonia the standard working week is Monday to Friday (40 hours per week). Shops and private businesses are almost always open in Saturday, but with shorter working hours. Sunday is officially by law not working day, but some exceptions are made, some shops are open, malls are working and the establishment in the malls. The worker who works in Sunday has the right to at least 50% pay for every hour spent on the job and using free day in the next 7 days.

==== Poland ====
The working week is Monday to Friday; 8 hours per day, 40 hours in total per week. Large malls are open on Saturdays; many small shops are also opened on Sundays. The first Sunday in which trading was banned was 11 March 2018. After that date all malls and shops were only allowed to trade on the first and last Sunday of each month. In 2019, additional restrictions limited trading to the last Sunday of every month. Then, in 2020, trading was prohibited on all Sundays each year, including those leading up to Christmas and Easter.

Bakeries, confectioners, petrol stations, florists, post offices, train stations and airports will be exempt from the ban. Owners will be able to open their shops as long as they serve customers themselves.

Anyone infringing the new rules faces a fine of up to PLN 100,000 (EUR 23,900; USD 29,250). Repeat offenders may face a prison sentence.

==== Portugal ====
The working week is Monday to Friday; 8 hours per day, 40 hours in total per week (7 hours per day, 35 hours in total per week for civil servants). Street shops are almost always open on Saturday mornings but shopping centres are typically open every day (including Saturdays and Sundays).

==== Romania ====
The working week is Monday to Friday; 8 hours per day, 40 hours in total per week. Shops are open on Saturday and Sunday. The weekend begins on Friday, and ends on Monday.

==== Russia ====
In Russia, the common working week begins on Monday and ends on Friday with 8 hours per day.

Federal law defines a working week duration of 5 or 6 days with no more than 40 hours worked. In all cases Sunday is a holiday. With a 5-day working week the employer chooses which day of the week will be the second day off. Usually this is a Saturday, but in some organizations (mostly government), it is Monday. Government offices can thereby offer Saturday service to people with a normal working schedule.

There are non-working public holidays in Russia; all of them fall on a fixed date. By law, if such a holiday coincides with an ordinary day off, the next work day becomes a day off. An official public holiday cannot replace a regular day off. Each year the government can modify working weeks near public holidays in order to optimize the labor schedule. For example, if a five-day week has a public holiday on Tuesday or Thursday, the calendar is rearranged to provide a reasonable working week.

Exceptions include occupations such as transit workers, shop assistants, and security guards. In many cases independent schemes are used. For example, the service industry often uses the X-through-Y scheme (Russian: X через Y) when every worker uses X days for work and the next Y days for rest.

==== Serbia ====
In Serbia, the working week is Monday to Friday; 8 hours per day (with 30 minutes break included), 40 hours in total per week. Shops are open on Saturday and Sunday, usually with shorter working hours, although many large shops of shop chains and shopping malls have same weekday and weekend working hours.

==== Slovakia ====
The working week is Monday to Friday; 8 hours per day, 40 hours in total per week. Large malls are open on Saturday and Sunday; many small shops are closed on Sunday. All stores are by law closed on public holidays with the exception granted to gas stations and those where the shop owners decide to open and sell by themselves directly; usually small grocery stores on outskirts or in suburbs.

==== Soviet Union ====
In the former Soviet Union, the standard working week was 41 hours: 8 hours, 12 minutes, Monday to Friday. Before the mid-1960s there was a 41-hour 6-day standard working week: 7 hours Monday to Friday and 6 hours on Saturday.

==== Spain ====
The working week is Monday to Friday; 8 hours per day, 40 hours in total per week. The traditional opening hours are 9:00 to 13:00–14:00 and then 15:00–16:00 to 18:00 for most offices and workplaces. Most shops are open on Saturday mornings and many of the larger shopping malls are open all day Saturday and in some cities like Madrid, they are open most Sundays. Some restaurants, bars, and shops are closed Mondays, as Mondays are commonly a slow business day.

==== Sweden ====
In Sweden, the standard working week is Monday to Friday, both for offices and industry workers. The standard workday is eight hours, although it may vary greatly between different fields and businesses. Most office workers have flexible working hours and can largely decide themselves on how to divide these over the week. The working week is regulated by Arbetstidslagen (Work time law) to a maximum of 40 hours per week. The 40-hour-week is however easily bypassed by overtime. The law allows a maximum of 200 hours overtime per year. There is however no overseeing government agency; the law is often cited as toothless.

Shops, supermarkets and shopping centres are almost always open on Saturdays and often on Sundays. Traditionally, restaurants were closed on Mondays if they were open during the weekend, but this has in recent years largely fallen out of practice. Many museums do however still remain closed on Mondays.

==== Switzerland ====
In Switzerland, the maximum working hours per week is 45 hours for employees in industrial companies and retail companies but 50 hours for other employees. The average workweek in hours is 35.7. The workweek is usually from Monday to Friday with a maximum of 5.5 working days per week.

==== Ukraine ====
The working week is Monday to Friday; 8 hours per day, 40 hours in total per week. Shops are open on Saturday and Sunday. The weekend begins on Friday, and ends on Monday.

==== United Kingdom ====
The traditional business working week is from Monday to Friday (typically 35 to 40 hours depending on contract). In retail, and other fields such as healthcare, days off might be taken on any day of the week. Employers can have their employees work every day of a week, although the employer is required to allow each employee breaks of either a continuous period of 24 hours every week or a continuous period of 48 hours every two weeks.

Laws for shop opening hours differ between Scotland and the rest of the UK. In England, Wales, and Northern Ireland, many shops and services are open on Saturdays and increasingly so on Sundays as well. In England and Wales, stores' maximum Sunday opening hours vary according to the total floor space of the store. In Scotland, however, there is no restriction in law on shop opening hours on a Sunday.

The maximum average working week in the UK is 48 hours, as normally calculated as an average over the course of seventeen weeks. This was established in UK law in 1998. However, the UK allows individuals to opt out if they so choose and there are exceptions, such as for those working in emergency services. Individuals can choose to opt in again after opting out, even if opting out was part of their employment contract. It is illegal to dismiss them or treat them unfairly for so doing – but they may be required to give up to 3 months' notice to give the employer time to prepare, depending on what their employment contract says.

The minimum holiday entitlement is now 28 days per year, but that can include public holidays, depending on the employee's contract. England and Wales have eight, Scotland has nine, and Northern Ireland has ten permanent public holidays each year. The 28 days holiday entitlement means that if the government creates a one-off public holiday in a given year, it is not necessarily a day off and it does not add a day to employees' holiday entitlement unless the employer says otherwise, which some do.

=== By weekends other than Saturday to Sunday ===
==== Thursday–Friday weekend ====
In Islam, Friday is the weekly day of prayer when Jumu'ah prayers take place. For this reason, most of the Middle Eastern countries and some Muslim-majority countries followed the Thursday and Friday weekend. However, this weekend arrangement is no longer observed by any country (see below).

==== Friday weekend (One day weekend) ====
- In Iran, Thursday is half a day of work for most public offices and all schools are closed, but for most jobs, Thursday is a working day. Private and foreign companies however normally have Friday and Saturday as their weekend.
- In Djibouti, many offices also tend to open early – around 7:00 or 8:00, then close at 13:00 or 14:00, especially during the summer due to the afternoon heat.

==== Friday–Saturday weekend ====
- Algeria (2010)
- Afghanistan (2015)
- Bahrain (2006)
- Bangladesh
- Egypt
- Israel
- Iraq (2005–2006)
- Jordan (Week of January 8, 2000)
- Kuwait (2007)
- Libya (2005–2006)
- Malaysia in the states of Kedah, Kelantan, Terengganu, and Johor (previously used until 31 December 1993, switched back on 1 January 2014. Switch back again to Saturday-Sunday weekend starting 1 January 2025).
- Maldives (2013)
- Oman (2013)
- Palestine
- Qatar
- Saudi Arabia (2013)
- Sudan (2008)
- Syria
- Yemen (2013)

==== Saturday–Sunday weekend, with arrangements on Friday ====
Some countries with a Muslim majority or substantial Muslim demographic follow the Saturday–Sunday weekend, such as Indonesia, Lebanon, Turkey, Tunisia and Morocco. While Friday is a working day, a long midday break is given to allow time for worship.

- Indonesia – In all provinces except Aceh, the lunch break on Fridays are extended for 2 hours or more. Shopping malls are always open and very crowded on Saturday and Sunday; some banks are open on weekends, especially for branches located in or near shopping malls.
- Malaysia – The Monday-Friday work week is observed in all states except Kedah, Kelantan, Terengganu, Johor (until 1 January 2025) and Sarawak. Lunch breaks are usually from 12:15pm–2:45pm on Fridays to allow the Muslims to perform their prayers.
- Mauritania (2014)
- Morocco – The working week is Monday to Friday, 8 hours per day, 40 hours in total per week; most businesses close from noon to 2:00 p.m.
- Pakistan follows the standard international 40-hour working week, from Monday to Friday, with Saturday and Sunday being the weekend. However, in many schools and enterprises, Friday is usually considered a half-day. The public sector weekend is Sunday only.
- Senegal – The working week is Monday to Friday, with a large break on Friday afternoon.
- Tunisia – The working week is Monday to Friday; 8 hours per day, 40 hours in total per week, most businesses close from noon to 2:00 p.m.
- Turkey – Working above 45 hours is considered overtime, and the employer is required to pay 1.5 times the hourly wage per hours.
- United Arab Emirates (2022) – Friday is half working day from 8 am until noon. Jumu'ah prayer would be at 1 pm.

==== Non-contiguous working week ====
- Brunei Darussalam is the only country in the world that has a non-contiguous working week, consisting of Monday to Thursday plus Saturday. The resting days are Friday, which a significant part of the population devotes to Jumu'ah prayers, and Sunday. Some non-government companies in Brunei adopt the working week of Monday to Friday. Depending on the company rules, employees may be required to work half-day on Saturday.
- The Indonesian province of Aceh is the only province that currently uses the non-contiguous working week, consisting of Monday to Thursday plus Saturday. Resting days are Friday, often used for Friday prayers, and Sunday. Some private and foreign businesses and companies in Aceh however adopted the Monday-Friday workweek.

=== Countries with special hours during Ramadan ===
- Algeria
- Bahrain
- Bangladesh
- Egypt
- Indonesia
- Iran
- Iraq
- Jordan
- Kuwait
- Lebanon
- Maldives
- Malaysia
- Morocco
- Oman
- Pakistan
- Qatar
- Saudi Arabia
- Syria
- Tunisia
- United Arab Emirates

== See also ==
- Business day
- Calendar day
- Critique of work
- Days of the week
- Eight-hour day
- Four-day workweek
- Feria
- Labour and employment law
- Long weekend
- Post-work society
- Refusal of work
- Right to rest and leisure
- Saint Monday (precursor of modern weekend)
- Shopping hours
- Sunday scaries
- The 11-day weekend
- Waiting for the Weekend
- Working time – how much time people spend working in a day, week, or year
- Work–life balance
