= Rosemary Sullivan =

Canadian writer (born 1947)

Rosemary Sullivan OC
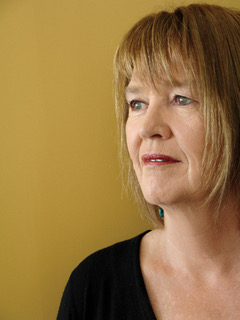
- Rosemary Sullivan
- Born: 1947 (age 78–79); Valois, Quebec, Canada
- Education: McGill University; University of Connecticut; University of Sussex
- Occupation: Writer
- Writing career
- Genres: Biography; poetry
- Notable works: The Space a Name Makes (1986); Shadow Maker (1995); Stalin's Daughter (2015)
- Notable awards: Lorne Pierce Medal (2008); Hilary Weston Writers' Trust Prize for Nonfiction (2015); RBC Taylor Prize (2016)
- Website: rosemarysullivan.com

Rosemary Sullivan OC (born 1947) is a Canadian poet, biographer, and anthologist. She is also a professor emerita at the University of Toronto Mississauga.

== Biography ==
Sullivan was born in the small town of Valois on Lac Saint-Louis, just outside Montreal, Quebec. After graduating from St. Thomas High School, she attended McGill University on a scholarship, and received her bachelor's degree in 1968. Sullivan received her MA in 1969 from the University of Connecticut and then attended the University of Sussex, receiving a Ph.D. for her thesis The Garden Master: The Poetry of Theodore Roethke in 1972 (which was published as a book in 1975).

After she completed her Ph.D., Sullivan moved to France to teach at the University of Dijon, and then at the University of Bordeaux. Two years later she was hired at the University of Victoria, and then in 1977 at the University of Toronto, where she taught at its Mississauga campus until her retirement. In 1978, she decided to dedicate herself to her writing, while still teaching. She is now a professor emerita.

Sullivan's first collection of poems, The Space a Name Makes, was awarded the Gerald Lampert Award for the best first book of poetry published in Canada in 1968. In 1987, Sullivan began writing a biography of Elizabeth Smart, By Heart, which was published in 1991 by Penguin Books. It was nominated for a Governor General's Award for Non-Fiction. Sullivan realized that she had a passion for biography. Her Shadow Maker: The Life of Gwendolyn MacEwen, which was published in 1995, won numerous awards, including the Governor General's Award for Non-Fiction, the Canadian Authors’ Association Award for Non-Fiction, the University of British Columbia's President's Medal for Biography, and the City of Toronto Book Award. Another of her biographies, The Red Shoes: Margaret Atwood Starting Out, was published in 1998, and reprinted in 2020. In 1991, she published Labyrinth of Desire, a meditation on women and romantic obsession, and in 2006, Villa Air-Bel: World War II, Escape and a House in Marseille, which won the Canadian Jewish Books Yad Vashem Award in Holocaust History. Her 2015 biography Stalin’s Daughter: The Extraordinary and Tumultuous Life of Svetlana Alliluyeva won the American Plutarch BIO award; The RBC Taylor Prize for Non-Fiction; the BC National Non-Fiction Prize; the Hilary Weston Writers’ Trust Non-Fiction Prize; and was a finalist for the American Pen Award for Biography and the National Books Critics Circle Award.

In 2022, HarperCollins released The Betrayal of Anne Frank: a Cold Case Investigation. Sullivan was enlisted to write the book by a research team investigating the betrayal of Anne Frank, detailing the investigation and their conclusion that Jewish notary Arnold van den Bergh was the most likely suspect. That conclusion was challenged by experts. The book was taken out of circulation in the Netherlands but remains available everywhere else.

Aside from her writing career, Sullivan has worked with Amnesty International; in 1980 she founded an International congress called The Writer and Human Rights in Aid of Amnesty, attended by 70 writers from thirty countries. The papers were published by Doubleday in Canada and the U.S. in 1983. She has traveled all over the world, including Russia, Czechoslovakia, Cuba, Chile, and Nicaragua.

== Awards ==
Sullivan was appointed an Officer of the Order of Canada in 2012 and received the Queen Elizabeth II Diamond Jubilee Medal that same year. In 2008, she received the Lorne Pierce Medal for Major Contribution to Canadian Literature, the Royal Society of Canada. In 2015, she won the Hilary Weston Writers' Trust Prize for Nonfiction for Stalin's Daughter, her biography of Svetlana Alliluyeva. She has been a Trudeau Fellow; a Guggenheim Fellow; a Jackman Humanities Fellow; and a Killam Fellow and was Canada Research Chair in Literature at the University of Toronto from 2001 to 2011.

== Works ==
=== Biography ===
- By Heart: Elizabeth Smart, a Life (1991)
- Shadow Maker: The Life of Gwendolyn MacEwen (1995)
- The Red Shoes: Margaret Atwood Starting Out (1998)
- Villa Air-Bel: World War II, Escape, and a House in Marseille (2006)
- Stalin's Daughter: The Extraordinary and Tumultuous Life of Svetlana Alliluyeva (2015)
- The Betrayal of Anne Frank: A Cold Case Investigation ISBN 9-7814-4346-304-1 (2022)

=== Verse ===
- The Space a Name Makes (1986)
- Blue Panic (1991)
- The Bone Ladder: New and Selected Poems (2000)

=== Criticism ===
- The Garden Master: The Poetry of Theodore Roethke (1975)

=== Non-fiction ===
- Labyrinth of Desire: Women, Passion, and Romantic Obsession (2001)
- Memory Making: Selected Essays (2001)
- Cuba: Grace Under Pressure (2003)
- The Guthrie Road (2009)

=== Anthologies ===
- Elements of Fiction (1982, co-editor)
- Stories by Canadian Women (1984)
- Poetry in English: An Anthology (1987)
- Poetry by Canadian Women (1989)
- Oxford Book of Stories by Canadian Women in English (2000)
- Short Fiction, An Anthology, with Mark Levene, (2003)

=== Children's literature ===
- Molito (2011)

== See also ==
- Canadian poetry

Awards
| Preceded by Paul Wyczynski | Lorne Pierce Medal; 2008 | Succeeded by Sherrill Grace |
| Preceded by Naomi Klein | Hilary Weston Writers' Trust Prize for Nonfiction; 2015 | Succeeded by Deborah Campbell |
| Preceded by Plum Johnson | RBC Taylor Prize; 2016 | Succeeded by Ross King |
