= Redrawing Nations =

2001 book

- Editor: Philipp Ther, Ana Siljak
- Genre: Essay collection
- Publication date: 2001

Redrawing Nations: Ethnic Cleansing in East-Central Europe, 1944–1948 is a 2001 collection of essays edited by Philipp Ther and Ana Siljak which deals with the flight and expulsion of Germans during and after World War II.
