= Waiting for the Weekend =

Book by Witold Rybczynski

- Author: Witold Rybczynski
- Language: English
- Genre: Non-fiction
- Publication date: 1991

Waiting for the Weekend is a book published in 1991 by Canadian architect, professor and writer Witold Rybczynski.

In Waiting for the Weekend, Rybczynski recounts the evolution of the seven-day week, which came into being with the Babylonian calendar, and the later, more modern, development of the two-day weekend. In so doing, he tells the history of leisure and time off; starting first with "taboo" days, market days, public festivals and holy days and how, with the coming of the Industrial Revolution the practice of "keeping Saint Monday", that is, staying home from work, evolved into the modern weekend.
