= The Most Beautiful House in the World =

Book by Witold Rybczynski

- Author: Witold Rybczynski
- Language: English
- Subject: Architecture
- Genre: Non-fiction
- Publication date: 1989

The Most Beautiful House in the World is a book published in 1989 by Canadian architect, professor and writer Witold Rybczynski.

The Most Beautiful House in the World recounts Rybczynski's experience building a house for himself and his wife. As he describes the long process of designing and constructing the house (essentially alone), he meanders through various related topics, eventually coming to the point where he can answer the question hidden in the title of the book: "What is the most beautiful house in the world?"
