= RBC Taylor Prize =

Former Canadian literary award for non-fiction

- Awarded for: English-language Canadian literary non-fiction work
- Country: Canada
- Presented by: RBC Wealth Management and the Charles Taylor Foundation
- First award: 2000
- Final award: 2020
- Website: www.rbctaylorprize.ca

The RBC Taylor Prize (2000–2020), formerly known as the Charles Taylor Prize, was a Canadian literary award, presented by the Charles Taylor Foundation to the best Canadian work of literary non-fiction. It was named for Charles P. B. Taylor, a noted Canadian historian and writer. Instituted in 2000, the 2020 prize was the final year the prize was awarded.

The prize was originally presented every two years until 2004, and became an annual award from 2004 onwards. The monetary value of the award increased over the years. The final award in 2020 had a monetary value of $30,000.

The award changed its name in December 2013, when RBC Wealth Management was announced as the new corporate sponsor. Under RBC's sponsorship, the award added a second $10,000 award for an emerging Canadian literary non-fiction writer between the ages of 18 and 35, to be chosen by the winner of the main award. This award was presented for the first time at the 2014 ceremony.

In 2018, the new RBC Taylor Prize Emerging Writers Mentorship Program was unveiled. This was a professional development program designed to support the next generation of Canadian writers and was part of the RBC Taylor Prize Emerging Writers Award, a distinction that was given annually to a Canadian author whose work embodies the pursuit of excellence in literary non-fiction.

The mentorship program was made available to five Canadian non-fiction writers, who were selected in partnership with a national network of university and college writing programs. These students were paired with the 2018 RBC Taylor Prize shortlisted authors, who would help support their career development and growth.

In 2020, the organizers announced that the 2020 award would be the final presentation of the award.

== Winners and nominees ==
RBC Taylor Prize winners and finalists
Year	Author	Title	Result
2000	Wayne Johnston	Baltimore's Mansion	Winner
2000	Witold Rybczynski	A Clearing in the Distance: Frederick Law Olmsted and North America in the Nineteenth Century	Finalist
2000	Eric Wright	Always Give a Penny to a Blind Man	Finalist
2000	Lisa Appignanesi	Losing the Dead	Finalist
2000	Wayson Choy	Paper Shadows: A Chinatown Childhood	Finalist
2002	Carol Shields	Jane Austen	Winner
2002	Nega Mezlekia	Notes from the Hyena's Belly: Memories of my Ethiopian Boyhood	Finalist
2002	Margaret Visser	The Geometry of Love: Space, Time, Mystery and Meaning in an Ordinary Church	Finalist
2002	A. B. McKillop	The Spinster and the Prophet: Florence Deeks, H.G. Wells and the Mystery of the Purloined Past	Finalist
2002	Michael David Kwan	Things That Must Not Be Forgotten: A Childhood in Wartime China	Finalist
2002	Clark Blaise	Time Lord: The Remarkable Canadian who Missed His Train and Changed the World	Finalist
2004	Isabel Huggan	Belonging: Home Away From Home	Winner
2004	J. Edward Chamberlin	If This Is Your Land, Where Are Your Stories?	Finalist
2004	Gertrud Mackprang Baer	In the Shadow of Silence: From Hitler Youth to Allied Internment, A Young Woman's Story of Truth and Denial	Finalist
2004	Warren Cariou	Lake of the Prairies: A Story of Belonging	Finalist
2004	Margaret MacMillan	Paris 1919: Six Months that Changed the World	Finalist
2005	Charles Montgomery	The Last Heathen: Encounters with Ghosts and Ancestors in Melanesia	Winner
2005	Paul William Roberts	A War Against Truth: An Intimate Account of the Invasion of Iraq	Finalist
2005	Christopher Dewdney	Acquainted With the Night: Excursions Through the World After Dark	Finalist
2005	Patrick Lane	There is a Season: A Memoir in the Garden	Finalist
2006	J. B. MacKinnon	Dead Man in Paradise	Winner
2006	Laura M. MacDonald	Curse of the Narrows: the Halifax Explosion of 1917	Finalist
2006	John Terpstra	The Boys, or Waiting for the Electrician's Daughter	Finalist
2006	James Chatto	The Greek for Love: A Memoir of Corfu	Finalist
2007	Rudy Wiebe	Of This Earth: A Mennonite Boyhood in the Boreal Forest	Winner
2007	John English	Citizen of the World: The Life of Pierre Elliott Trudeau, Vol. One: 1919-1968	Finalist
2007	Ross King	The Judgment of Paris: The Revolutionary Decade That Gave the World Impressionism	Finalist
2008	Richard Gwyn	John A.: The Man Who Made Us: The Life and Times of John A. Macdonald, Vol. One: 1815-1867	Winner
2008	Lorna Goodison	From Harvey River: A Memoir of My Mother and Her People	Finalist
2008	Anna Porter	Kasztner's Train: The True Story of Rezso Kasztner, Unknown Hero of the Holocaust	Finalist
2008	Kevin Bazzana	Lost Genius: The Story of a Forgotten Musical Maverick	Finalist
2008	David Gilmour	The Film Club: A True Story of a Father and Son	Finalist
2009	Tim Cook	Shock Troops: Canadians Fighting the Great War 1917-1918	Winner
2009	Ana Siljak	Angel of Vengeance: The Girl Assassin, the Governor of St. Petersburg and Russia's Revolutionary World	Finalist
2009	Elizabeth Abbott	Sugar: A Bittersweet History	Finalist
2010	Ian Brown	The Boy in the Moon: A Father's Search For His Disabled Son	Winner
2010	John English	Just Watch Me: The Life of Pierre Elliott Trudeau, 1968-2000	Finalist
2010	Daniel Poliquin	René Lévesque	Finalist
2010	Kenneth Whyte	The Uncrowned King: The Sensational Rise of William Randolph Hearst	Finalist
2011	Charles Foran	Mordecai: The Life & Times	Winner
2011	Ross King	Defiant Spirits: The Modernist Revolution of the Group of Seven	Finalist
2011	Stevie Cameron	On the Farm: Robert William Pickton and the Tragic Story of Vancouver’s Missing Women	Finalist
2011	George Sipos	The Geography of Arrival: A Memoir	Finalist
2011	Merrily Weisbord	The Love Queen of Malabar: Memoir of a Friendship with Kamala Das	Finalist
2012	Andrew Westoll	The Chimps of Fauna Sanctuary: A Canadian Story of Resilience and Recovery	Winner
2012	Madeline Sonik	Afflictions & Departures: Essays	Finalist
2012	Charlotte Gill	Eating Dirt: Deep Forests, Big Timber and Life with the Tree-Planting Tribe	Finalist
2012	Wade Davis	Into the Silence: The Great War, Mallory and the Conquest of Everest	Finalist
2012	JJ Lee	The Measure of a Man: The Story of a Father, a Son and a Suit	Finalist
2013	Andrew Preston	Sword of the Spirit, Shield of Faith: Religion in American War and Diplomacy	Winner
2013	Sandra Djwa	Journey with No Maps: A Life of P.K. Page	Finalist
2013	Ross King	Leonardo and The Last Supper	Finalist
2013	Carol Bishop-Gwyn	The Pursuit of Perfection: A Life of Celia Franca	Finalist
2013	Tim Cook	Warlords: Borden, Mackenzie King, and Canada’s World Wars	Finalist
2014	Thomas King	The Inconvenient Indian: A Curious Account of Native People in North America	Winner
2014	David Stouck	Arthur Erickson: An Architect’s Life	Finalist
2014	Graeme Smith	The Dogs Are Eating Them Now: Our War in Afghanistan	Finalist
2014	Charlotte Gray	The Massey Murder: A Maid, Her Master, and the Trial That Shocked a Country	Finalist
2014	J. B. MacKinnon	The Once and Future World: Nature As It Was, As It Is, As It Could Be	Finalist
2015	Plum Johnson	They Left Us Everything	Winner
2015	M. G. Vassanji	And Home Was Kariakoo: A Memoir of East Africa	Finalist
2015	Kathleen Winter	Boundless: Tracing Land and Dream in a New Northwest Passage	Finalist
2015	David O'Keefe	One Day in August: The Untold Story Behind Canada’s Tragedy at Dieppe	Finalist
2015	Barbara Taylor	The Last Asylum: A Memoir of Madness in Our Times	Finalist
2016	Rosemary Sullivan	Stalin's Daughter: The Extraordinary and Tumultuous Life of Svetlana Alliluyeva	Winner
2016	David Halton	Dispatches from the Front: The Life of Matthew Halton, Canada’s Voice at War	Finalist
2016	Ian Brown	Sixty: The Beginning of the End, or the End of the Beginning?	Finalist
2016	Wab Kinew	The Reason You Walk	Finalist
2016	Camilla Gibb	This Is Happy	Finalist
2017	Ross King	Mad Enchantment: Claude Monet and the Painting of the Water Lilies	Winner
2017	Max Eisen	By Chance Alone: A Remarkable True Story of Courage and Survival at Auschwitz	Finalist
2017	Marc Raboy	Marconi: The Man Who Networked the World	Finalist
2017	Matti Friedman	Pumpkinflowers: A Soldier’s Story	Finalist
2017	Diane Schoemperlen	This Is Not My Life: A Memoir of Love, Prison, and Other Complications	Finalist
2018	Tanya Talaga	Seven Fallen Feathers: Racism, Death, and Hard Truths in a Northern City	Winner
2018	Max Wallace	In the Name of Humanity	Finalist
2018	Stephen R. Bown	Island of the Blue Foxes: Disaster and Triumph on Bering’s Great Voyage to Alaska	Finalist
2018	James Maskalyk	Life on the Ground Floor: Letters from the Edge of Emergency Medicine	Finalist
2018	Daniel Coleman	Yardwork: A Biography of an Urban Place	Finalist
2019	Kate Harris	Lands of Lost Borders: Out of Bounds on the Silk Roads	Winner
2019	Elizabeth Hay	All Things Consoled: A Daughter’s Memoir	Finalist
2019	Ian Hampton	Jan in 35 Pieces: A Memoir in Music	Finalist
2019	Bill Gaston	Just Let Me Look at You: On Fatherhood	Finalist
2019	Darrel J. McLeod	Mamaskatch: A Cree Coming of Age	Finalist
2020	Mark Bourrie	Bush Runner	Winner
2020	Robyn Doolittle	Had It Coming	Finalist
2020	Jessica McDiarmid	Highway of Tears	Finalist
2020	Timothy Winegard	The Mosquito	Finalist
2020	Ziya Tong	The Reality Bubble	Finalist

== RBC Taylor Emerging Writer Award ==
The RBC Taylor Emerging Writer Award was instituted for the first time in 2014. The award was presented to an emerging writer selected by the winner of that year's primary award, and consisted of $10,000 and a mentorship from the writer who made the selection.

In 2018, the RBC Taylor Foundation also announced the creation of a mentorship program for writers who had not yet published their first non-fiction manuscript. Five writers would be selected for the mentorship each year, each receiving mentorship from one of the shortlisted main prize authors.

- 2014 - Leanne Betasamosake Simpson
- 2015 - Iain Reid
- 2016 - Adnan Khan
- 2017 - Cassi Smith
- 2018 - Alicia Elliott
- 2019 - Jessica J. Lee
- 2020 - Simone Dalton
