= Home: A Short History of an Idea =

1986 book by Witold Rybczynski

- First edition
- Author: Witold Rybczynski
- Language: English
- Publisher: Viking Press
- Publication date: 1986

Home: A Short History of An Idea is a book published in 1986 by Canadian architect, professor and writer Witold Rybczynski.

Home won the 1986 Governor General's Award for non-fiction.

The book is an extended essay on the evolution of domestic living and culture; Rybczynski recounts the history of the material and cultural influences (such as intimacy and privacy, domesticity, ease) as well as ideas about light, air, and efficiency, all of which he claims to have helped shape the idea of comfort. The book was a bestseller. In an article published by The New Yorker in 2022, Ian Parker referred to the book as "a classic 1986 study of domestic architecture".

One of the book's central themes is how homes began to be designed with more emphasis on personal identity and comfort, not just utility. This shift in focus is tied to broader social changes, such as the rise of the middle class, increased mobility, and new technologies in heating, lighting, and construction materials.
