= George Sipos =

Canadian poet

- Born: Budapest, Hungary
- Occupations: Poet, journalist, arts manager
- Writing career
- Period: 2000s–present
- Notable works: The Geography of Arrival, Anything But the Moon

George Sipos is a Canadian poet best known for his Charles Taylor Prize-nominated 2010 memoir The Geography of Arrival.

Born in Budapest, Hungary, Sipos emigrated with his family to London, Ontario in childhood. He spent much of his adulthood in Prince George, British Columbia, where he taught at the College of New Caledonia, owned and operated a book store, Mosquito Books, and served general manager of the Prince George Symphony Orchestra.

He has also published two volumes of poetry, Anything But the Moon (2005) and The Glassblowers (2010). Anything But the Moon was a shortlisted nominee for the Dorothy Livesay Poetry Prize in 2006.

He currently resides on Saltspring Island, where he has been executive director of the ArtSpring arts and culture festival and a freelance contributor to the Gulf Islands Driftwood community newspaper.
