= Andrew Preston (historian) =

Canadian historian (born 1973)

- Born: Andrew Malcolm Preston; 1973 (age 52–53); Brockville, Ontario, Canada
- Awards: Charles Taylor Prize (2013)

Academic background
- Education: University of Toronto (BA); London School of Economics (MA); Sidney Sussex College, Cambridge (PhD)
- Thesis: The Little State Department (2001)

Academic work
- Discipline: History
- Sub-discipline: American history
- Institutions: University of Victoria; Yale University; Clare College, Cambridge; University of Virginia
- Main interests: History of American foreign relations
- Notable works: Sword of the Spirit, Shield of Faith (2012)

Andrew Malcolm Preston (born 1973) is a Canadian historian, who won the 2013 Charles Taylor Prize for his book Sword of the Spirit, Shield of Faith: Religion in American War and Diplomacy. He is the W.L. Lyons Brown Jr. Jefferson Scholars Foundation Distinguished Professor of Diplomacy and Statecraft at the University of Virginia.

== Education ==
Preston is a Professor of American history at the University of Virginia. Originally from Ontario, Canada, Preston was educated at the University of Toronto, the London School of Economics (LSE), and Sidney Sussex College, Cambridge University. He previously taught at the University of Victoria, Yale University, and Cambridge University where he was a postdoctoral educator.

== Research ==
Preston is the author of Sword of the Spirit, Shield of Faith: Religion in American War and Diplomacy for which he won the Charles Taylor Prize in 2013. His prior publications include The War Council: McGeorge Bundy, the NSC, and Vietnam (2006) and Nixon in the World: U.S. Foreign Relations, 1969–1977 (2008).

=== Total Defense ===
In 2025, Preston released his fourth book, Total Defense: The New Deal and the Invention of National Security (Belknap/Harvard, 2025). Preston argues that, in the United States, the concept of national security comes from the concept of social security and the New Deal in 1937. In the book's introduction he says that "the causal arrow flowed very much from the welfare state to the warfare state.” Prior to the 1930s, ideas of national defense were understood simply to mean physical defense of the nation's territories. After the late 1930s, Americans "began to envision national defense as the protection of their general place in the world—and ultimately their way of life" and thus the emergence of the term national security. On page 11, Preston argues that President Franklin D. Roosevelt exaggerated the physical threat Germany posed to the United States and "the doctrine of national security was born from this exaggeration of vulnerability through the elevation of uncertainty."

Awards
Preceded by Andrew Westoll	Charles Taylor Prize; 2013	Succeeded by Thomas King as RBC Taylor Prize
