= A Clearing in the Distance =

Book by Witold Rybczynski

- Author: Witold Rybczynski
- Language: English
- Subject: Biography
- Genre: Non-fiction
- Publisher: Scribner
- Publication date: 1999
- Pages: 480
- ISBN: 9780684824635

A Clearing in the Distance: Frederick Law Olmsted and North America in the Nineteenth Century is a biography of 19th-century landscape architect Frederick Law Olmsted, published in 1999, by Canadian architect, professor and writer Witold Rybczynski. Andrew Delbanco reviewed it for The New York Review of Books. Suzannah Lessard reviewed it for The New York Times.

It was short-listed for the Charles Taylor Prize in 2000.
