= Madeline Sonik =

Canadian author (born 1960)

- Born: Madeline Sonik; Detroit, Michigan
- Occupation: Writer
- Writing career
- Period: 1990s–present
- Notable works: Arms, Afflictions & Departures

Madeline Sonik (born May 12, 1960) is a Canadian author.

== Biography ==
Madeline Sonik was born in Detroit, Michigan, May 12, 1960. She was of mixed English-Russian parentage.

Sonik was educated at the University of Western Ontario, Canada, and at the University of British Columbia, where she earned a doctorate for a thesis that explored the application of Jungian principles to the creative writing process.

She has taught creative writing courses in Vancouver and Victoria, British Columbia, and from 2008 to 2010 was a post-doctoral fellow in the Department of Writing at the University of Victoria. In spring 2015, she served as writer-in-residence at the University of Windsor in Windsor, Ontario.

Her publications include a novel, a short story collection, a children's book, a poetry collection, and a volume of personal essays. In addition, she has coedited three Canadian anthologies and has won many awards for her nonfiction, including the Annie Dillard Award for Creative Nonfiction (2006). Her novel Arms was described by The Globe and Mail as a "verbal heartache, a bravura performance of language and perverse imagination".

Sonik currently resides in Victoria, British Columbia, where she teaches in the Department of Writing at the University of Victoria.

== Awards and honours ==
Sonik was among 10 authors longlisted for the 2012 BC National Award for Canadian Non-Fiction. The nomination was for Afflictions & Departures, which illustrates an experimental nonfiction genre Sonik has termed a "fracture". "A fracture is a series of short, linked memoir pieces that uses techniques of hard-boiled journalism and literary fiction, and self-consciously disrupts or fractures conceptions of linear time." The book was also a shortlisted nominee for the 2012 Charles Taylor Prize. It won the City of Victoria Butler Book Prize 2012.

== Bibliography ==
- Fresh Blood: New Canadian Gothic Fiction., ed. Winnipeg: Turnstone, 1998.
- Drying the Bones. Madeira Park, BC: Nightwood Editions, 2000.
- Entering the Landscape., ed. Ottawa: Oberon, 2001.
- Arms. Madeira Park, BC: Nightwood Editions, 2002.
- Belinda and the Dustbunnys. Vancouver: Hodgepog, 2003.
- When I Was a Child: Stories for Grownups and Children., ed. Ottawa: Oberon, 2003.
- Stone Sightings. Toronto: Inanna Publications, 2008.
- Afflictions & Departures. Vancouver: Anvil Press, 2011.
- Fontainebleau. Vancouver: Anvil Press, 2020.
