= West-Running Brook =

1928 poetry collection by Robert Frost

West Running Brook
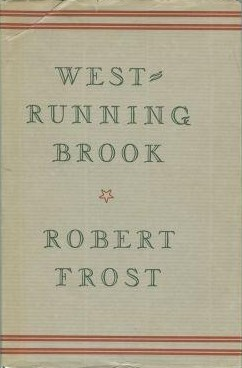
- Cover of the first edition
- Author: Robert Frost
- Illustrator: J. J. Lankes
- Genre: Poetry collection
- Published: 1928

West-Running Brook is a poetry collection by Robert Frost, written in 1923 and published by Henry Holt and Company in 1928, containing woodcut illustrations by J. J. Lankes.

The title of the poem that the volume is named by has been called very significant. Where the poem takes place (Derry, New Hampshire), due to its location near the coast, all rivers flow towards the ocean except for West Running Brook (a real brook), which goes westward making itself unique. In the same way, the poet trusts himself to go by contraries.

Because of this book, Robert Frost is called "Home-Spun Philosopher".

This book entered the public domain in the United States in 2024.

== Contents ==
- "Spring Pools"
- "The Freedom of the Moon"
- "The Rose Family"
- "Fireflies in the Garden"
- "Atmosphere"
- "Devotion"
- "On Going Unnoticed"
- "The Cocoon"
- "A Passing Glimpse"
- "A Peck of Gold"
- "Acceptance"
- "Once by the Pacific"
- "Lodged"
- "A Minor Bird"
- "Bereft"
- "Tree at My Window"
- "The Peaceful Shepherd"
- "The Thatch"
- "A Winter Eden"
- "The Flood"
- "Acquainted with the Night"
- "The Lovely Shall Be Choosers"
- "West-Running Brook"
- "Sand Dunes"
- "Canis Major"
- "A Soldier"
- "Immigrants"
- "Hannibal"
- "The Flower Boat"
- "The Times Table"
- "The Investment"
- "The Last Mowing"
- "The Birthplace"
- "The Door in the Dark"
- "Dust in the Eyes"
- "Sitting by a Bush in Broad Sunlight"
- "The Armful"
- "What Fifty Said"
- "Riders"
- "On Looking Up by Chance at the Constellations"
- "The Bear"
- "The Egg and the Machine"

== See also ==
- 1928 in poetry
