= Valois, Pointe-Claire =

Valois
- neighbourhood former village
- Interactive map of Valois
- Coordinates: 45°27′00.3″N 73°47′28.9″W
- Country: Canada
- Province: Quebec
- Region: Montreal
- City: Pointe-Claire
- Founded: 1723 (Area settled by Jean-Baptiste de Valois)
- Merged with Pointe-Claire: 1911
- Time zone: UTC-5 (Eastern (EST))
  - Summer (DST): UTC-4 (EDT)
- Postal code span: H9R
- Area codes: (514) and (438)
- Website: City of Pointe-Claire

Valois (French pronunciation: [valwa]) is a neighbourhood in the city of Pointe-Claire, Quebec, Canada. It was once a separate village, many years ago, but was then merged with Pointe-Claire in 1911.

Valois used to be a beach destination in the late 1800s to early 1900s, but now public access to the beach is minimal: either via the Pointe-Claire Nautical Centre or the Valois dog park beach.

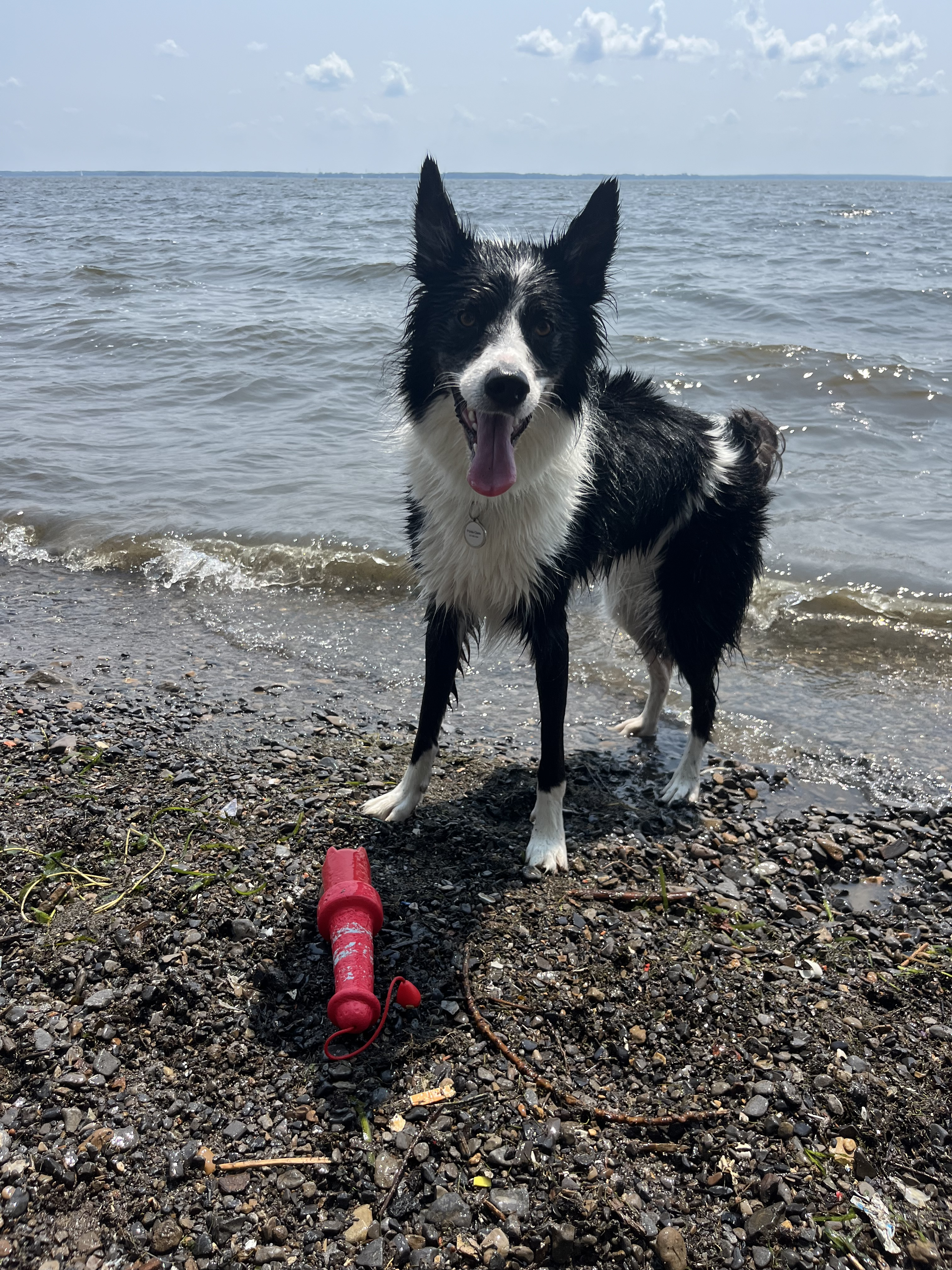
Dog swimming at Valois Beach in Pointe-Claire, QC

Population (2011): The population of Valois is 4,910, with 70% of the population being residents for over 10 years. 78% of the population are homeowners, higher than the average of both Pointe-Claire and the West Island. 58% of the housing in Valois is detached homes. The Employment Rate of Valois is 68% with an unemployment rate of 5%. the median income of residents aged 15 years and older is $32,841 and the average income is $42,330.
