= Leisure =

Time that is freely disposed by individuals

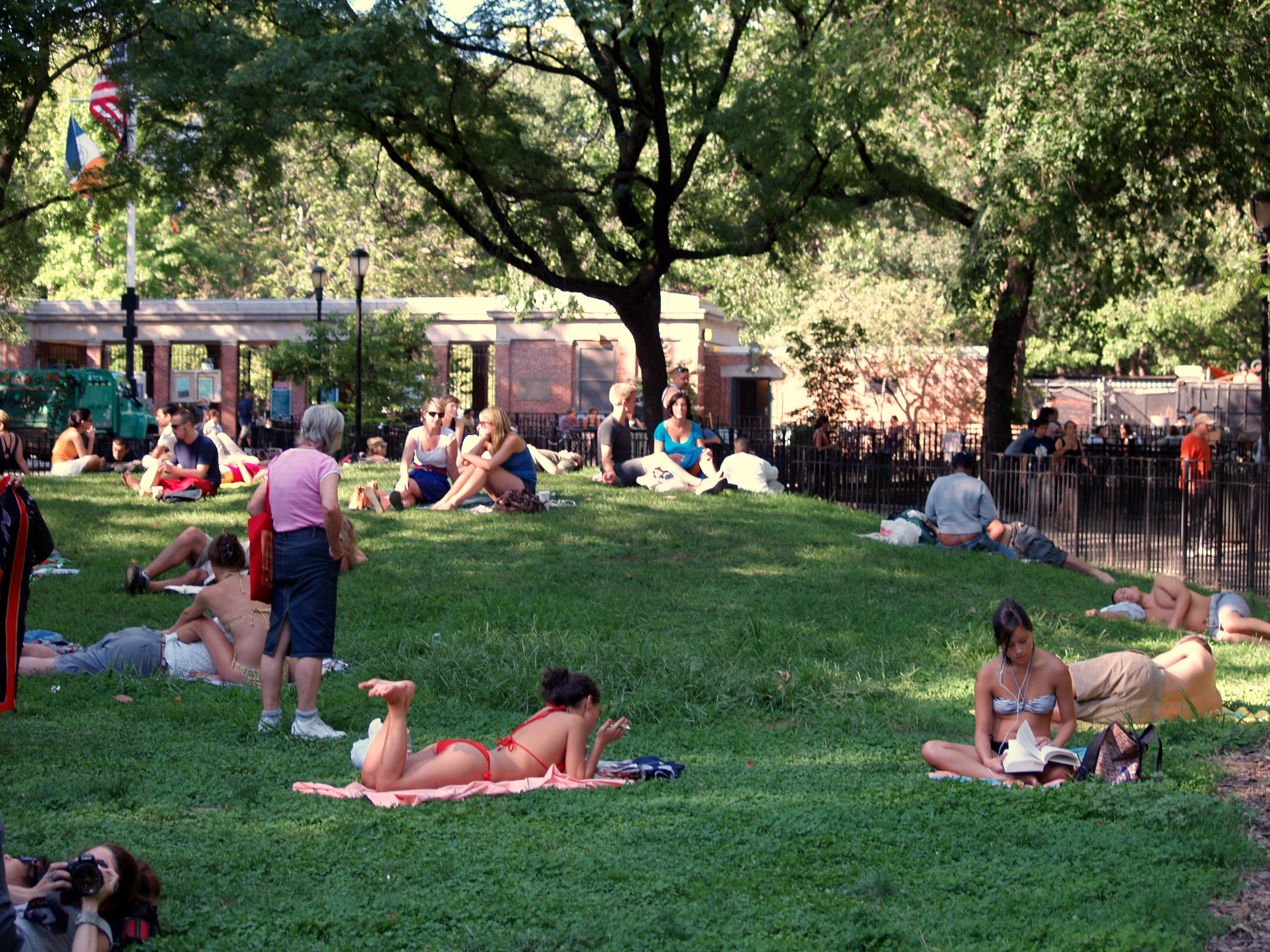
Public parks were initially set aside for leisure, recreation and sport.

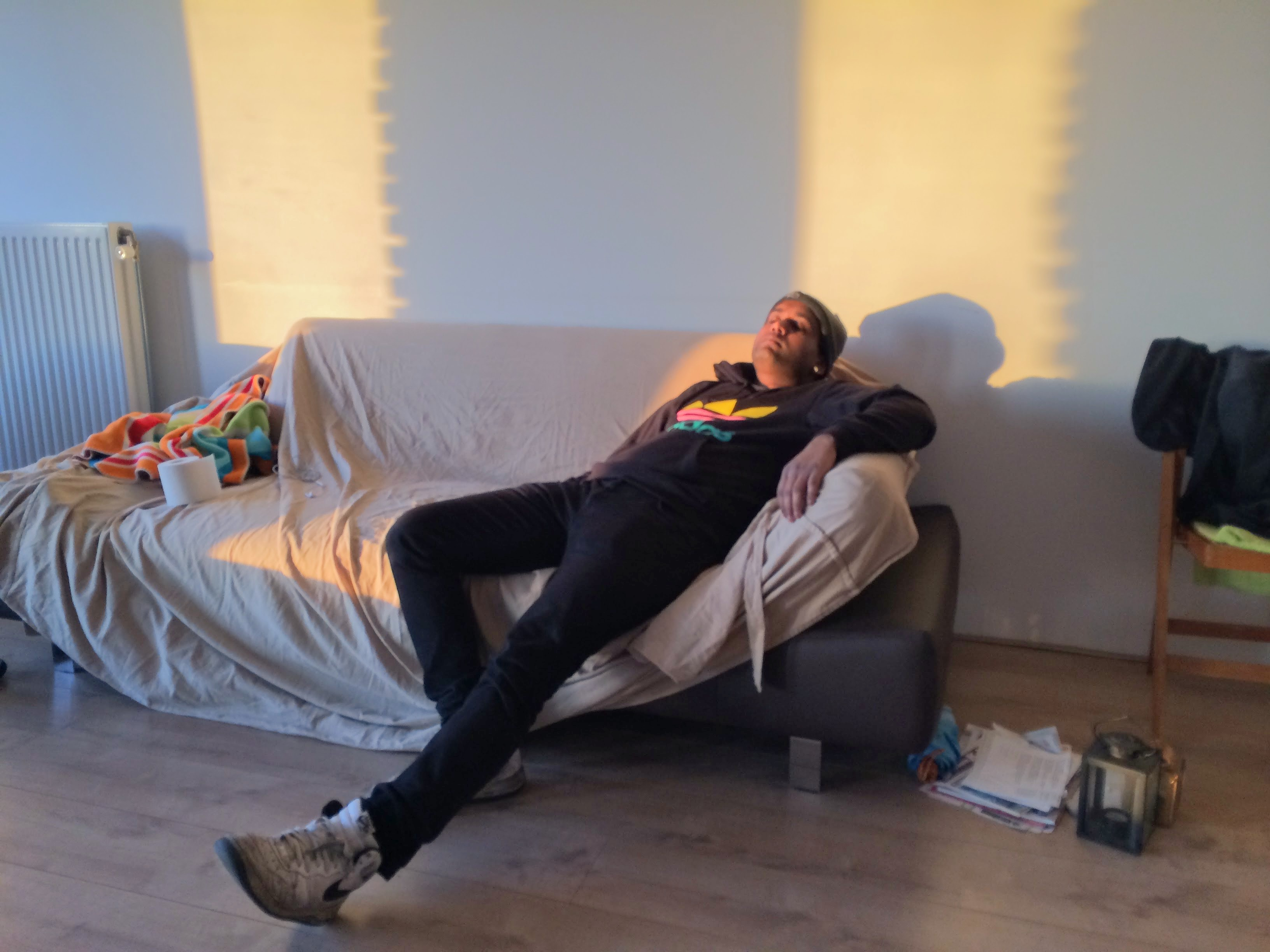
A man relaxing on a couch

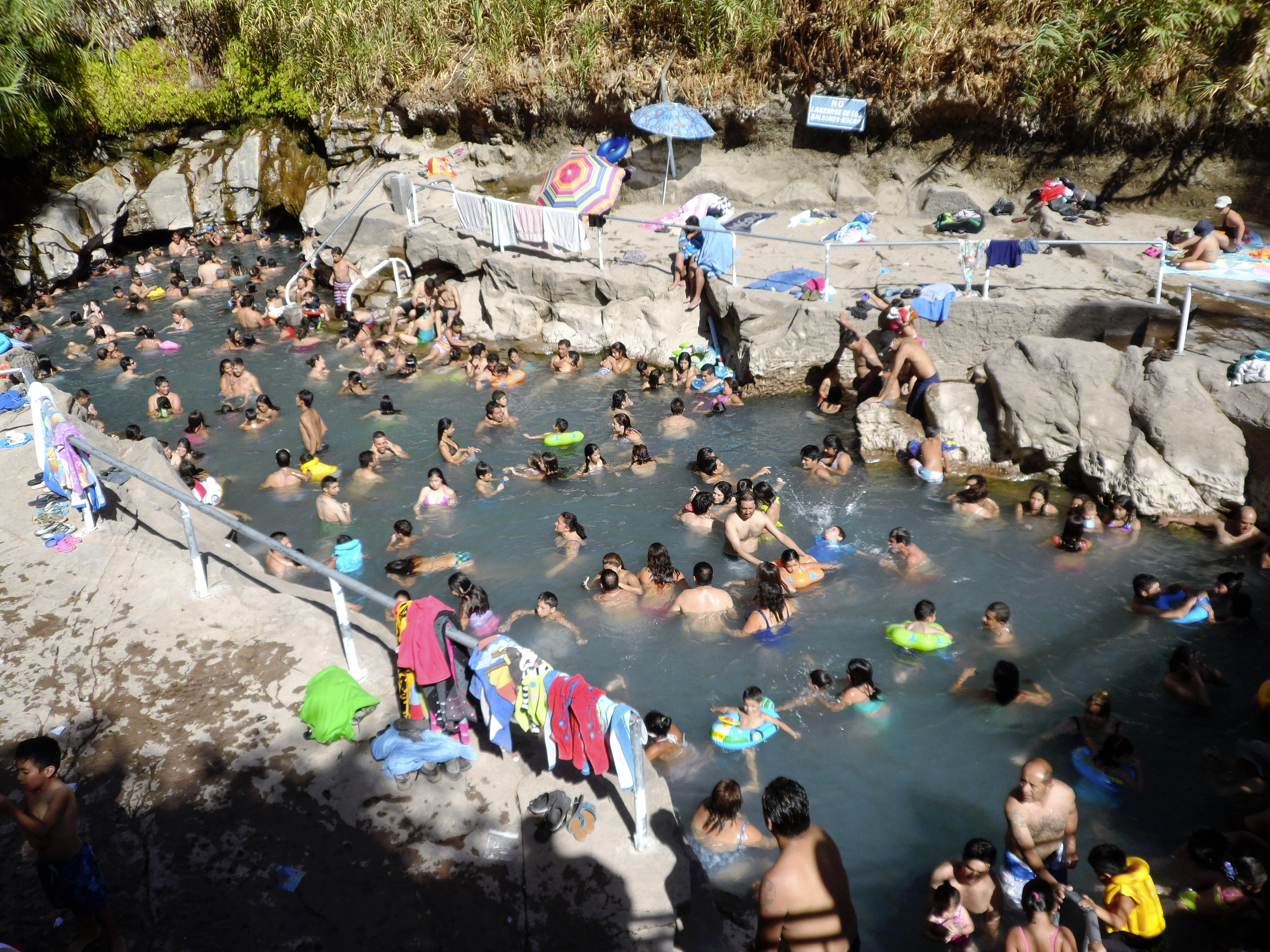
Leisure time swimming at an oasis

Leisure (UK: /ˈlɛʒər/, US: /ˈliː-/) has often been defined as a quality of experience or as free time. Free time is time spent away from business, work, job hunting, domestic chores, and education, as well as necessary activities such as eating and sleeping. Leisure as an experience usually emphasizes dimensions of perceived freedom and choice. It is done for "its own sake", for the quality of experience and involvement. Other classic definitions include Thorstein Veblen's (1899) of "nonproductive consumption of time." Free time is not easy to define due to the multiplicity of approaches used to determine its essence. Different disciplines have definitions reflecting their common issues: for example, sociology on social forces and contexts and psychology as mental and emotional states and conditions. From a research perspective, these approaches have an advantage of being quantifiable and comparable over time and place.

Leisure studies and sociology of leisure are the academic disciplines concerned with the study and analysis of leisure. Recreation differs from leisure in that it is a purposeful activity that includes the experience of leisure in activity contexts. Economists consider that leisure times are valuable to a person like wages. If it were not, people would have worked instead of taking leisure. However, the distinction between leisure and unavoidable activities is not a rigidly defined one, e.g. people sometimes do work-oriented tasks for pleasure as well as for long-term utility. A distinction between free time and discretionary time is sometimes made. A related concept is social leisure, which involves leisurely activities in social settings, such as extracurricular activities, e.g. sports, clubs. Another related concept is that of family leisure. Relationships with others is usually a major factor in both satisfaction and choice.

The concept of leisure as a human right was realised in article 24 of the Universal Declaration of Human Rights.

== History ==
Leisure has historically been the privilege of the upper class. Opportunities for leisure came with more money, or organization, and less working time, rising dramatically in the mid-to-late 19th century, starting in Great Britain and spreading to other rich nations in Europe. It spread as well to the United States, although that country had a reputation in Europe for providing much less leisure despite its wealth. Immigrants to the United States discovered they had to work harder than they did in Europe. Economists continue to investigate why Americans work longer hours. In a recent book, Laurent Turcot argues that leisure was not created in the 19th century but is imbricated in the occidental world since the beginning of history.

=== Canada ===
In Canada, leisure in the country is related to the decline in work hours and is shaped by moral values, and the ethnic-religious and gender communities. In a cold country with winter's long nights, and summer's extended daylight, favorite leisure activities include horse racing, team sports such as hockey, singalongs, roller skating and board games. The churches tried to steer leisure activities, by preaching against drinking and scheduling annual revivals and weekly club activities. By 1930 radio played a major role in uniting Canadians behind their local or regional hockey teams. Play-by-play sports coverage, especially of ice hockey, absorbed fans far more intensely than newspaper accounts the next day. Rural areas were especially influenced by sports coverage.

=== France ===
Leisure by the mid-19th century was no longer an individualistic activity. It was increasingly organized. In the French industrial city of Lille, with a population of 80,000 in 1858, the cabarets or taverns for the working class numbered 1300, or one for every three houses. Lille counted 63 drinking and singing clubs, 37 clubs for card players, 23 for bowling, 13 for skittles, and 18 for archery. The churches likewise have their social organizations. Each club had a long roster of officers, and a busy schedule of banquets, festivals and competitions. At the turn of the century thousands of these clubs had been created.

=== United Kingdom ===
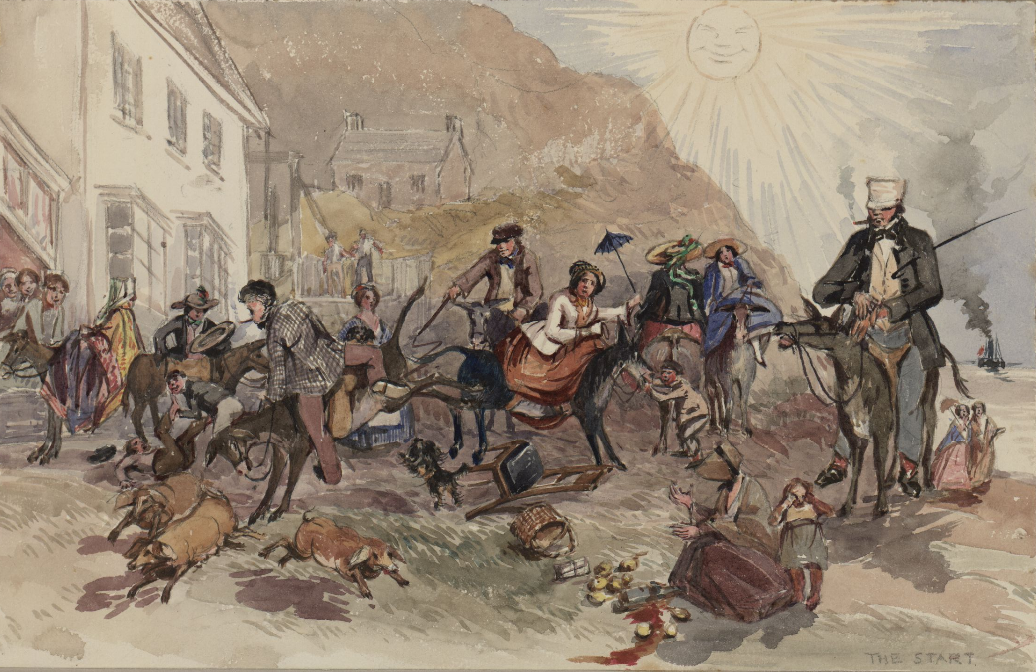
A caricature of upper class Victorian tourists, 1852

As literacy, wealth, ease of travel, and a broadened sense of community grew in Britain in the mid-19th century onward, there was more time and interest in leisure activities of all sorts, on the part of all classes.

Opportunities for leisure activities increased more because real wages continued to grow and hours of work continued to decline. In urban Britain, the nine-hour day was increasingly the norm; the 1874 Factory Act limited the workweek to 56.5 hours. The movement toward an eight-hour day. Furthermore, system of routine annual vacations came into play, starting with white-collar workers and moving into the working-class. Some 200 seaside resorts emerged thanks to cheap hotels and inexpensive railway fares, widespread banking holidays and the fading of many religious prohibitions against secular activities on Sundays.

By the late Victorian era, the leisure industry had emerged in all British cities, and the pattern was copied across Western Europe and North America. It provided scheduled entertainment of suitable length and convenient locales at inexpensive prices. These include sporting events, music halls, and popular theater. By 1880 football was no longer the preserve of the social elite, as it attracted large working-class audiences. Average gate was 5,000 in 1905, rising to 23,000 in 1913. That amounted to 6 million paying customers with a weekly turnover of £400,000. Sports by 1900 generated some three percent of the total gross national product in Britain. Professionalization of sports was the norm, although some new activities reached an upscale amateur audience, such as lawn tennis and golf. Women were now allowed in some sports, such as archery, tennis, badminton and gymnastics.

Leisure was primarily a male activity, with middle-class women allowed in at the margins. There were class differences with upper-class clubs, and working-class and middle-class pubs. Heavy drinking declined; there was more betting on outcomes. Participation in sports and all sorts of leisure activities increased for average English people, and their interest in spectator sports increased dramatically.

By the 1920s the cinema and radio attracted all classes, ages, and genders in very large numbers. Giant palaces were built for the huge audiences that wanted to see Hollywood films. In Liverpool 40 percent of the population attended one of the 69 cinemas once a week; 25 percent went twice. Traditionalists grumbled about the American cultural invasion, but the permanent impact was minor.

The British showed a more profound interest in sports, and in greater variety, that any rival. They gave pride of place to such moral issues as sportsmanship and fair play. Cricket became symbolic of the Imperial spirit throughout the Empire. Soccer proved highly attractive to the urban working classes, which introduced the rowdy spectator to the sports world. In some sports, there was significant controversy in the fight for amateur purity especially in rugby and rowing. New games became popular almost overnight, including golf, lawn tennis, cycling and hockey. Women were much more likely to enter these sports than the old established ones. The aristocracy and landed gentry, with their ironclad control over land rights, dominated hunting, shooting, fishing and horse racing.

Cricket had become well-established among the English upper class in the 18th century, and was a major factor in sports competition among the public schools. Army units around the Empire had time on their hands, and encouraged the locals to learn cricket so they could have some entertaining competition. Most of the Empire embraced cricket, with the exception of Canada. Cricket test matches (international) began by the 1870s; the most famous is that between Australia and Britain for "The Ashes".

== Types ==
The range of leisure activities extends from the very informal and casual to highly organised and long-lasting activities. A significant subset of leisure activities are hobbies which are undertaken for personal satisfaction, usually on a regular basis, and often result in satisfaction through skill development or recognised achievement, sometimes in the form of a product. The list of hobbies is ever changing as society changes.

Free time and discretionary time are similar but not always the same. Free time is the time available after work, chores, and other daily routine activities, while discretionary time is the estimate of time you have left after only necessary activities.

Substantial and fulfilling hobbies and pursuits are described by Sociologist Robert Stebbins as serious leisure. The serious leisure perspective is a way of viewing the wide range of leisure pursuits in three main categories: casual leisure, serious leisure, and project-based leisure.

=== Serious leisure ===
"Serious leisure is the systematic pursuit of an amateur, hobbyist, or volunteer ... that is highly substantial, interesting, and fulfilling and where ... participants find a [leisure] career...". For example, collecting stamps or maintaining a public wetland area.

People undertaking serious leisure can be categorised as amateurs, volunteers or hobbyists. Their engagement is distinguished from casual leisure by a high level of perseverance, effort, knowledge and training required and durable benefits and the sense that one can create in effect a leisure career through such activity.

The range of serious leisure activities is growing rapidly in modern times with developed societies having greater leisure time, longevity and prosperity. The Internet is providing increased support for amateurs and hobbyists to communicate, display and share products.

==== Reading ====
As literacy and leisure time expanded after 1900, reading became a popular pastime. Libraries saw heavy demand for new fiction. A dramatic innovation was the inexpensive paperback, pioneered by Allen Lane (1902–1970) at Penguin Books in 1935. The first titles included novels by Ernest Hemingway and Agatha Christie. They were sold cheap (usually sixpence) in a wide variety of inexpensive stores such as Woolworths. Penguin aimed at an educated middle class "middlebrow" audience. It avoided the downscale image of American paperbacks. The line signaled cultural self-improvement and political education. The more polemical Penguin Specials, typically with a leftist orientation for Labour readers, were widely distributed during World War II. However the war years caused a shortage of staff for publishers and book stores, and a severe shortage of rationed paper, worsened by the air raid on Paternoster Square in 1940 that burned 5 million books in warehouses.

Romantic fiction was especially popular, with Mills and Boon the leading publisher. Romantic encounters were embodied in a principle of sexual purity that demonstrated not only social conservatism, but also how heroines could control their personal autonomy. Adventure magazines became quite popular, especially those published by DC Thomson; the publisher sent observers around the country to talk to boys and learn what they wanted to read about. The story line in magazines and cinema that most appealed to boys was the glamorous heroism of British soldiers fighting wars that were perceived as exciting and just.

=== Casual leisure ===
"Casual leisure is immediately, intrinsically rewarding; and it is a relatively short-lived, pleasurable activity requiring little or no special training to enjoy it." For example, watching TV or going for a swim.

=== Project-based leisure ===
"Project-based leisure is a short-term, moderately complicated, either one-shot or occasional, though infrequent, creative undertaking carried out in free time." For example, working on a single Wikipedia article or building a garden feature.

== Cultural differences ==
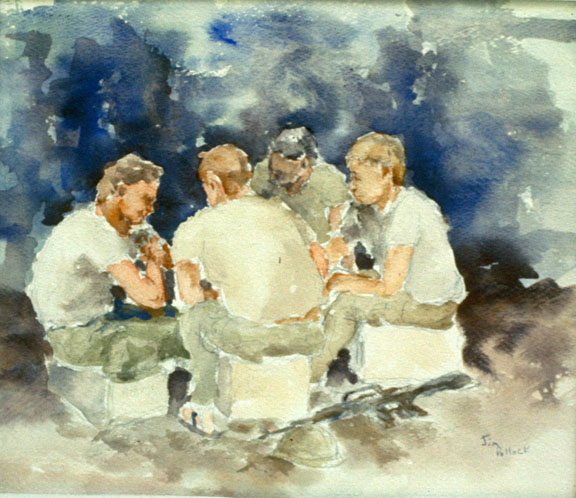
GI Card Game, watercolor by James Pollock, U. S. Army Vietnam Combat Artists Team IV (CAT IV 1967). During the Vietnam War soldiers waiting to go on patrol would sometimes spend their leisure time playing cards. Courtesy National Museum of the United States Army.

Time available for leisure varies from one society to the next, although anthropologists have found that hunter-gatherers tend to have significantly more leisure time than people in more complex societies. As a result, band societies such as the Shoshone of the Great Basin came across as extraordinarily lazy to European colonialists.

Workaholics, less common than the social myths, are those who work compulsively at the expense of other activities. They prefer to work rather than spend time socializing and engaging in other leisure activities.

European and American men statistically have more leisure time than women, due to both household and parenting responsibilities and increasing participation in the paid employment. In Europe and the United States, adult men usually have between one and nine hours more leisure time than women do each week.

== Family leisure ==
Family leisure is defined as time that parents, children and siblings spend together in free time or recreational activities, and it can be expanded to address intergenerational family leisure as time that grandparents, parents, and grandchildren spend together in free time or recreational activities. Leisure can become a central place for the development of emotional closeness and strong family bonds. Contexts such as urban/rural shape the perspectives, meanings, and experiences of family leisure. For example, leisure moments are part of work in rural areas, and the rural idyll is enacted by urban families on weekends, but both urban and rural families somehow romanticize rural contexts as ideal spaces for family making (connection to nature, slower and more intimate space, notion of a caring social fabric, tranquillity, etc.). Also, much "family leisure" requires tasks that are most often assigned to women. Family leisure also includes playing together with family members on the weekend day.

== Aging ==
Leisure is important across the lifespan and can facilitate a sense of control and self-worth. Older adults, specifically, can benefit from physical, social, emotional, cultural, and spiritual aspects of leisure. Leisure engagement and relationships are commonly central to "successful" and satisfying aging. For example, engaging in leisure with grandchildren can enhance feelings of generativity, whereby older adults can achieve well-being by leaving a legacy beyond themselves for future generations.

== See also ==
- Conspicuous consumption
- Conspicuous leisure
- Entertainment
- Labour economics
- Leisure industry
- Leisure satisfaction
- Leisure studies
- Lifestyle (social sciences)
- Recreation
- The Theory of the Leisure Class
- Time poverty
- Travel + Leisure
- Waiting for the Weekend
- Work–life balance
