= Acquainted with the Night =

Poem by Robert Frost

"Acquainted with the Night" is a poem by Robert Frost. It first appeared in the Autumn 1928 issue of the Virginia Quarterly Review and was republished later that year in his poetry collection West-Running Brook.

== Text ==
I have been one acquainted with the night.
I have walked out in rain—and back in rain.
I have outwalked the furthest city light.

I have looked down the saddest city lane.
I have passed by the watchman on his beat
And dropped my eyes, unwilling to explain.

I have stood still and stopped the sound of feet
When far away an interrupted cry
Came over houses from another street,

But not to call me back or say good-bye;
And further still at an unearthly height,
One luminary clock against the sky

Proclaimed the time was neither wrong nor right.
I have been one acquainted with the night.

== Analysis ==
The poem is written in strict iambic pentameter, with 14 lines like a sonnet, but with a terza rima rhyme scheme which follows the complex pattern of: ABA BCB CDC DAD AA. An earlier example of the measure's adaptation to the sonnet form is found in Percy Bysshe Shelley's "Ode to the West Wind".

== Publication history ==
The poem first appeared in the Autumn 1928 issue of The Virginia Quarterly Review, edited by James Southall Wilson. It was republished that year by Henry Holt and Company in the poetry collection West-Running Brook.

== Sources ==
- Nancy Lewis Tuten; John Zubizarreta (2001). The Robert Frost Encyclopedia. Greenwood Publishing Group. ISBN 978-0-313-29464-8.
- Jay Parini (2000). Robert Frost: A Life. Macmillan. ISBN 978-0-8050-6341-7.
- Jeffrey Meyers (1996). Robert Frost: A Biography. Houghton Mifflin. ISBN 978-0-3958-5603-1.
