= One Good Turn (Rybczynski book) =

Book by Witold Rybczynski

One Good Turn: A Natural History of the Screwdriver and the Screw
- Author: Witold Rybczynski
- Language: English
- Genre: Non-fiction
- Publication date: 2000

One Good Turn: A Natural History of the Screwdriver and the Screw is a book published in 2000 by Canadian architect, professor and writer Witold Rybczynski.

== History ==
The idea for the book came in 1999 when an editor at The New York Times Magazine asked Rybczynski to write a short essay on the best and most useful common tool of the previous 1,000 years. Rybczynski took the assignment, but as he researched the history of the items in his workshop – hammers and saws, levels and planes – he found that most dated well back into antiquity. At the point of giving up, he asked his wife for ideas. She answered: "You always need a screwdriver for something."

== Content ==
In the book, Rybczynski explains his discovery that the screwdriver is a relatively new addition to the toolbox, an invention of the Late Middle Ages in Europe and the only major mechanical device not independently invented by the Chinese. Leonardo da Vinci was there at the start, designing a number of screw-cutting machines with interchangeable gears. Nevertheless, it took generations for the screw (and with it, the screwdriver and lathe) to come into general use, and it was not until modern times that improvements such as slotted screws came into being. Rybczynski spends some time discussing the Canadian invention, the Robertson screwdriver.

== Reception ==
The book has been noted as relying on outdated histories and revealing of Rybczynski's "unfamiliarity with mechanical processes" but has been compared with Samuel C. Florman's works towards improving the public understanding of a technical field.
