= Plum Johnson =

Canadian writer and publisher

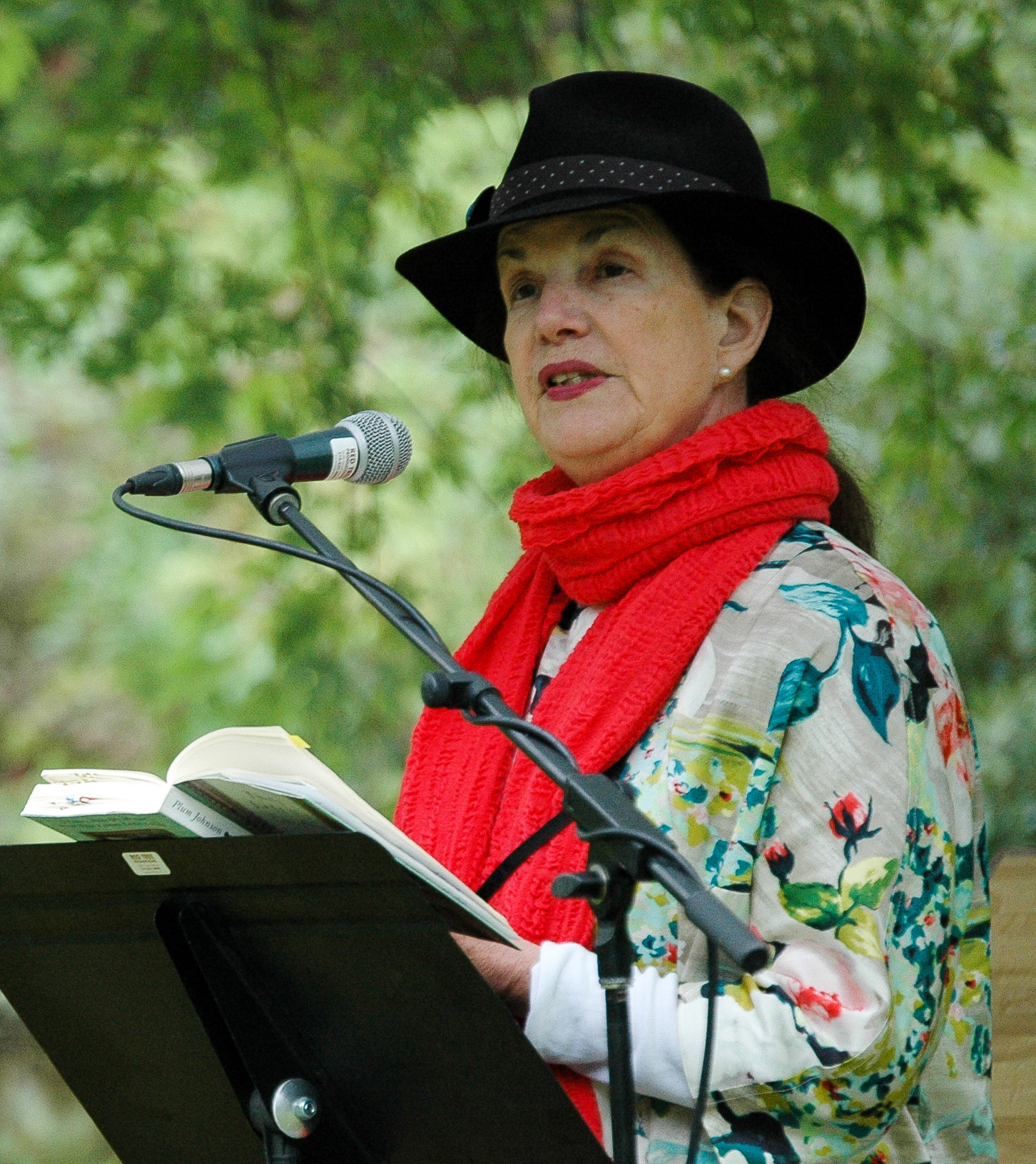
- Johnson at the Eden Mills Writers' Festival in 2015
- Born: Richmond, Virginia, United States
- Occupations: publisher, memoirist
- Writing career
- Period: 2000s-present
- Notable work: They Left Us Everything
- Website: plumjohnson.com

Plum Johnson is a Canadian writer and publisher, who won the RBC Taylor Prize in 2015 for her memoir They Left Us Everything.

Born in Richmond, Virginia, she spent her early childhood living in Asia until her parents moved to Oakville, Ontario. She studied education at Wheelock College in Boston and theatre at York University in Toronto.

In 1983, she established her own company, KidsCanada Publishing, to publish parenting publications such as the periodical Kids Toronto and children's and family service directories in both Toronto and Vancouver. In 2002, she launched Help's Here!, a similar resource publication for senior citizens and caregivers.

Johnson has also studied various art disciplines, including illustration, painting and printmaking. Her daughter Virginia is a noted Canadian textile artist.
