= Ana Siljak =

Canadian historian and writer

- Occupations: writer, historian, academic
- Writing career
- Period: 2000s–present
- Notable works: Angel of Vengeance: The Girl Assassin, the Governor of St. Petersburg and Russia's Revolutionary World

Ana Siljak is a Canadian historian and writer. She is best known for her Charles Taylor Prize-nominated book Angel of Vengeance: The Girl Assassin, the Governor of St. Petersburg and Russia's Revolutionary World, a biography of Vera Zasulich published in 2008.

She is a professor of Russian and Eastern European history at Queen's University in Kingston, Ontario, and has contributed reviews of history and non-fiction books to the Literary Review of Canada. She has a PhD in history from Harvard University. She was also coauthor with Philipp Ther of Redrawing Nations: Ethnic Cleansing in East-Central Europe, 1944-1948 (2001).
