= The 11-day weekend =

Period of four bank holidays in Britain in 2011

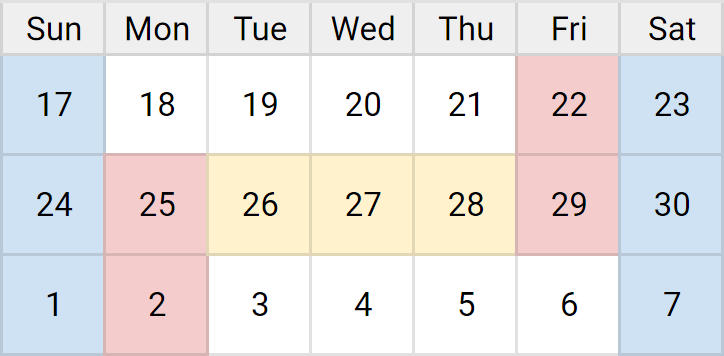
- Calendar of April and May 2011, showing weekends (blue), bank holidays (red) and days potentially taken off work (yellow)
- Also called: 11 day weekend
- Type: National
- Celebrations: Holiday
- Begins: Friday 22 April 2011
- Ends: Monday 2 May 2011
- Duration: 11 days
- Frequency: Once
- Related to: Good Friday, Holy Saturday, Easter Week, The Wedding of HRH Prince William with Miss Middleton, May Day, Early May bank holiday

The 11-day weekend was the name given by the British media to the period of time between Friday 22 April and Monday 2 May 2011.

As a moveable feast, the Easter bank holidays (Good Friday and Easter Monday) can occur any day between 20 March and 26 April. Since the early May Day bank holiday was introduced in 1978 it has occasionally fallen on the Monday immediately after Easter Monday. As this was due to happen in 2011, many forward-thinking workers were able to book four days of holiday that in reality meant eleven days off work.

On 23 November 2010, Buckingham Palace announced that the date of the Wedding of Prince William of Wales and Kate Middleton was to be 29 April 2011 and that it would be a bank holiday, thus reducing the need for holiday entitlement to three days.

An "11-day weekend" had previously occurred in Scotland between 25 December 1999 and 4 January 2000, a period which contained five bank holidays. This event happened at a time of year when it accepted that many days' productivity will be lost, whereas the 2011 "weekend" was during the Spring and just after the Great Recession. These economic "lost 11 days" echo an actual loss of 11 days that occurred in September 1752 following Great Britain's switch from the use of the Julian calendar to the Gregorian calendar.
