= Witold Rybczynski =

Canadian architect, professor, and writer

- Born: 1 March 1943 (age 83); Edinburgh, Scotland
- Education: McGill University
- Occupation: Architect
- Awards: J. Anthony Lukas Book Prize (2000); Vincent Scully Prize (2007)

Witold Rybczynski (born 1 March 1943) is a Canadian American architect, professor and writer. He is the Martin and Margy Meyerson Professor Emeritus of Urbanism at the University of Pennsylvania.

== Early life ==
Rybczynski was born in Edinburgh of Polish parentage and raised in Surrey, England, before moving at a young age to Canada. He attended Loyola College in Montreal. He received Bachelor of Architecture (1966) and Master of Architecture (1972) degrees from McGill University in Montreal.

== Career ==
Rybczynski has written around 300 articles and papers on the subjects of housing, architecture, and technology, many of which are aimed at a non-technical readership. His work has been published in a wide variety of magazines, including The Wilson Quarterly, The Atlantic Monthly, and The New Yorker. From 2004 to 2010, he was architecture critic for Slate.

He taught at McGill University (1974–1993) and the University of Pennsylvania (1993–2012), and served on the U.S. Commission of Fine Arts from 2004 to 2012. He now lives in Philadelphia and is Emeritus Professor of Architecture at the University of Pennsylvania. He was married to Shirley Hallam, who died in 2021.

== Awards and honors ==
Rybczynski's book Home: A Short History of an Idea was nominated for the 1986 Governor General's Award for non-fiction, and A Clearing in the Distance: Frederick Law Olmsted and North America in the Nineteenth Century won the J. Anthony Lukas Book Prize and was short-listed for the Charles Taylor Prize in 2000.

In 2007 Rybczynski was the recipient of the Seaside Prize and the Vincent Scully Prize, awarded by the National Building Museum. Rybczynski is a Senior Fellow of the Design Futures Council. In 2014 he received a National Design Award for Design Mind from the Cooper Hewitt Smithsonian Design Museum.

Rybczynski is an honorary fellow of the American Institute of Architects, and an honorary member of the American Society of Landscape Architects. He has received the AIA Collaborative Honors, and the Pennsylvania AIA President's Award. He holds honorary doctorates from McGill University and the University of Western Ontario.

== Works ==
External videos
- Booknotes interview with Rybczynski on A Clearing in the Distance, 17 October 1999, C-SPAN
- Presentation by Rybczynski on A Clearing in the Distance, 12 May 1999, C-SPAN
- Presentation by Rybczynski on One Good Turn, 13 September 2000, C-SPAN

- Paper Heroes: Appropriate Technology: Panacea or Pipe Dream? (1980)
- Taming the Tiger: The Struggle to Control Technology (1983)
- Home: A Short History of an Idea (1986)
- The Most Beautiful House in the World (1989)
- Waiting for the Weekend (1991)
- McGill: A Celebration (1991)
- Looking Around: A Journey Through Architecture (1992)
- A Place for Art/Un lieu pour l'art: The Architecture of the National Gallery of Canada (1993)
- City Life: Urban Expectations in a New World (1995)
- A Clearing in the Distance: Frederick Law Olmsted and North America in the Nineteenth Century (1999)
- One Good Turn: A Natural History of the Screwdriver and the Screw (2000)
- The Look of Architecture (2001)
- The Perfect House: A Journey with Renaissance Master Andrea Palladio (2002)
- Vizcaya: An American Villa and Its Makers (2006), co-written with Laurie Olin
- Last Harvest: How A Cornfield Became New Daleville: Real Estate Development in America (2007)
- My Two Polish Grandfathers: And Other Essays on the Imaginative Life (2009)
- Makeshift Metropolis: Ideas About Cities (2010)
- The Biography of a Building: How Robert Sainsbury and Norman Foster Built a Great Museum (2011)
- How Architecture Works: A Humanist's Toolkit (2013)
- Mysteries of the Mall: And Other Essays (2015)
- Now I Sit Me Down: From Klismos to Plastic Chair: A Natural History (2016) ISBN 978-0374223212
- Charleston Fancy: Little Houses and Big Dreams in the Holy City (2019)
- The Story of Architecture (2022)
- The Driving Machine: A Design History of the Car (2024)
- What Architecture Is (2026)

== See also ==
- Natalia Rybczynski
