= R/antiwork =

Subreddit associated with the anti-work movement

r/antiwork
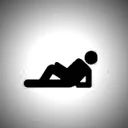
- Figure of a person lying down, used as the subreddit header
- Website type: Subreddit
- Founded: August 14, 2013; 13 years ago
- Website: www.reddit.com/r/antiwork/
- Users: >2.9 million members

r/antiwork is a subreddit associated with contemporary labor movements, critique of work, corporate capitalism and the anti-work movement. The forum's slogan reads: "Unemployment for all, not just the rich!" The subreddit was originally founded as a forum for discussion of anti-work ideology within post-left anarchism. However, following its rapid growth, the subreddit has come to represent a broader tent of left-wing politics centered on discussion of working conditions and labor activism. Posts on the forum commonly describe employees' negative experiences at work, dissatisfaction with working conditions, and unionization.

Various actions that have been promoted on the subreddit include a consumer boycott of Black Friday as well as the submission of fake jobs applications to the Kellogg Company after the company announced plans to replace 1,400 striking workers during the 2021 Kellogg's strike. The popularity of r/antiwork increased in 2020 and 2021, and the subreddit gained 900,000 subscribers in 2021 alone, accumulating nearly 1,700,000 subscribers by the end of the year. It is often associated with other ideologically similar subreddits such as r/latestagecapitalism. r/antiwork has been compared to the Occupy Wall Street movement due to the subreddit's intellectual foundations and decentralized ethos.

On January 25, 2022, one of the subreddit's moderators, Doreen Ford, participated in an interview with Fox News anchor Jesse Watters. The interview was overwhelmingly criticized on Reddit and other social media platforms, which prompted the subreddit to shut down temporarily.

== History ==
=== Beginnings (2013–2020) ===
r/antiwork was created in 2013 as a forum for discussion of anti-work thought within post-left anarchism. Its early years were shaped by Doreen Ford, a moderator on the subreddit since 2013. In 2014, Ford was writing a blog called AbolishWork.com. Until 2017, Ford worked at a series of retail jobs for a decade, which she described as "miserable". In 2017, Ford quit working in retail to work with animals, mainly dogs, on the advice of her grandmother. As of 2021, she earns a living through dog walking, pet sitting, and through crowdfunding on her Patreon.

=== Rapid growth (2020–2021) ===
r/antiwork began growing rapidly during the COVID-19 pandemic as millions of people were laid off from their jobs or made to work reduced hours. Remote workers began sharing various mouse jiggler strategies to combat bossware intended to monitor the productivity of employees.

In 2019, the number of subscribers was 13,000, which increased to 100,000 in early 2020. The subreddit's popularity increased after people began posting text messages of employees giving notice to their employers that they no longer wanted their jobs. In November 2021 the subscriber number exceeded one million. By December 2021 that number had grown to 1.4 million, and in January 2022 it was over 1.7 million. On January 26, r/antiwork was the subreddit with the highest increase of traffic that was not one of Reddit's "default" front page subreddits. A later analysis of the subreddit found that after it was first linked from a mainstream media article in mid-October 2021, its subscriber count rose by more than 330,000 (57%) within two weeks, making it the fastest-growing subreddit at the time.

In 2021, members of r/antiwork called for "Blackout Black Friday." While originally a general strike on Black Friday, it morphed into a consumer boycott. In December 2021, various members posted images of anti-work manifestos which had printed from receipt printers and referred readers to r/antiwork. Some Reddit users suggested that the printouts were fake, but the founder of cybersecurity firm GreyNoise told Vice that network traffic suggested they were being printed remotely to printers that were "misconfigured to be exposed to the internet".

In October 2021, r/antiwork went viral after a warehouse worker posted a screenshot of a text they sent to their supervisor announcing that they would quit their job, which resulted in "an avalanche of quitting texts from other users."

In November 2021, the most popular post on r/antiwork encouraged people to turn a McDonald's strike happening in the United States at the time into a larger general strike demanding that McDonald's pay its employees $25 an hour. The person who made the post then created and shared an anti-work sign with the slogan "McDonald's Employment Boycott" above an image of a worker swinging a hammer. People began printing out the sign and taping it up in fast food restaurants.

On December 9, 2021, after Kellogg's announced plans to hire new permanent workers to replace 1,400 striking workers, a thread on r/antiwork urged members to submit fake applications for the new positions in order to overwhelm the company's hiring system. As of December 10, 2021, the thread had more than 62,000 upvotes; the director of communications for the union representing the striking workers described it as "phenomenal". Members reported having submitted fake applications and that the application site had crashed repeatedly; a spokesperson for Kellogg's denied that the website had crashed, telling Business Insider that the hiring process was "fully operational". The initiative spread to other social media platforms.

=== Jesse Watters interview, internal controversy and aftermath (2022) ===
On January 25, 2022, Ford participated in an interview with Fox News anchor Jesse Watters. The interview received an overwhelmingly negative reception from members of the subreddit. Members of the subreddit questioned why Ford felt she had the authority to represent the anti-work movement. r/antiwork briefly went private the following day, and subreddit moderators said it was a temporary measure to prevent disruption from other subreddits. Noah Berlatsky, writing for The Independent, stated that the Fox News segment became "a publicity disaster for r/antiwork" and that r/antiwork became "widely ridiculed". Oliver Whang, writing for The New York Times, noted: "Theories started to bounce around about some outside corporate mastermind controlling the moderators, trying to turn the community against itself." Ford told Whang: "I had good intentions, but, yeah, that only does so much." Ford received harassment online, including graphic threats and people insulting her appearance. According to Nielsen Media Research, around 3.6 million viewers watched Watters' show on the day of the interview.

The subreddit r/workreform, whose motto was "Food, Healthcare, and Homes: for ALL WAGES", was started on January 26, and some members of r/antiwork migrated over. Within 24 hours, the subreddit had gained more than 400,000 members. The new subreddit's growth eventually slowed; it acquired about 450,000 members and has grown steadily since.

On January 27, subreddit moderator Kimezukae posted a statement on the subreddit saying that "We're going in the short-term future not accept any media interviews and we will ask the community on feedback regarding whether we will accept an interview or what kind of media outlets are outright banned". The statement also said that Ford would be removed as a moderator of the subreddit and that Kimezukae had done interviews with three major international media outlets that have not been published yet, including one with The New York Times. According to Vice, "Since the Fox News interview, however, the main topic of conversation on the subreddit has been the interview itself, who 'owns' the subreddit, the drama associated with the fallout from the interview, brigading from other subreddits, and censorship of posts about the Fox News interview." After r/antiwork was reopened to the public, all traces of Ford's account had been erased from the subreddit. Within a few days, posts about abusive bosses dominated the subreddit's content again and the subreddit has grown steadily since.

A quantitative analysis by researchers at the University of Helsinki, covering more than 300,000 posts and 12 million comments from January 2019 to July 2022, found that activity on the subreddit fell sharply after the interview even as subscriber numbers continued to rise. Daily posts peaked at 2,658 on January 26 before dropping to less than half the previous month's volume, comments fell 46.2% by January 29, and the subreddit lost 38,228 subscribers (2.2%) on January 27. The same study found no evidence of major shifts in the topics discussed after the subreddit's rapid growth; the most prevalent topics in each period studied were quitting, Reddit itself, and mental health.

In May 2022, in response to a leaked U.S. Supreme Court draft decision to overturn Roe v. Wade, members of r/antiwork promoted the idea of a general strike against a possible ruling by the Supreme Court that would overturn Roe. However, a subreddit moderator criticized attempts to organize a general strike through social media posts as being "unproductive."

=== Quiet quitting and later developments (2022–present) ===
In August 2022, as the term "quiet quitting" spread on social media, members of r/antiwork, by then described as having more than two million members, rejected it as a negative framing of employees setting boundaries, and promoted "act your wage" as an alternative. According to Reddit, "antiwork", "act your wage" and "quiet quitting" were the top trending keywords among work-related communities on the site in 2022, with "act your wage" rising 95% year over year.

A 2023 paper by Stillman, presented at the Association of Internet Researchers, drew on digital ethnography and interviews to examine managers who participate in r/antiwork. It also noted that after the Fox News interview, members left for more focused offshoots such as r/WorkReform and r/WorkersStrikeBack. A 2024 article in Peitho analyzed the Fox News interview as a moment in the circulation of "anti-work" discourse, arguing that it complicates traditional ideas about the Protestant work ethic and worker identity.

A 2025 study of how workers resist workplace surveillance technologies noted that workers on r/antiwork and similar forums trade mouse jigglers and other tools to evade monitoring.

As of August 2025, r/antiwork had 2.9 million subscribers and ranked in the top 1% of subreddits by size; after the 2022 decline, activity stabilized and then continued to grow.

== Content ==
r/antiwork uses the slogan "Unemployment for all, not just the rich!" Members of the subreddit are known as "idlers" in reference to the Protestant work ethic. Posts commonly criticize hustle culture and share stories of employees' negative experiences at their jobs, including unfair treatment by employers and poor working conditions, as well as poor pay. Other posts express members' happiness after quitting their jobs, a trend which began on the subreddit in 2020 and has been linked to the Great Resignation in 2021. According to subreddit moderator rockcellist, the most common issues raised by members of the subreddit include "stagnation of wages, overworking, being expected to be on call on and off the clock." According to Vice, members frequently discuss ways "to slack off, cheat, sabotage, and steal from their employers in act[s] of defiance". The subreddit's most popular posts are screenshots of resignation letters and text messages, which became so popular that the subreddit's moderators restricted these posts to only Sundays. Open discussion of worker salaries is encouraged, as is union organization.

The subreddit includes a digital library of books, texts, and podcasts including David Graeber's Bullshit Jobs, Bob Black's "The Abolition of Work", Karl Marx's "Wage Labour and Capital", Bertrand Russell's "In Praise of Idleness", Paul Lafargue's The Right to be Lazy, Devon Price's Laziness Does Not Exist, Kathi Weeks' The Problem with Work, David Frayne's The Refusal of Work and Herman Melville's "Bartleby, the Scrivener," as well as a collection of anti-work quotes, a soundtrack that includes "9 to 5", and an FAQ page.

=== Ideology ===
Members of r/antiwork hold varying views on work. The majority support a change in what is conceptualized as "work," while some advocate for the abolition of work altogether, and others are opposed to meaningless work or to work in a capitalist system. As membership in the subreddit increased, some longtime left-wing members have objected to the perceived liberal, moderate, reformist, and pro-capitalist ideologies of newcomers.

In November 2021, Ford told The Independent that "The main goal of the anti-work movement is just to abolish work, but what that ends up looking like is very different, depending on who you ask," noting that members of r/antiwork include "people who are anarchists, people who are Communists, people who are social democrats, people who like Bernie, people who like Andrew Yang" and concluding that "there's lots of different kinds of leftists." In December 2021, moderator rockcellist told Quartz that "There’s no particular political ideology that any of us follow" and that the posts on the subreddit reflect "how every individual views their labor, their contributions to society, how they're compensated." In January 2022, Brian O'Conner of the BBC wrote that the subreddit is "a community still rooted in direct action, but whose focus has both softened and broadened into a wider dialogue on working conditions as its popularity has grown."

An internal survey of 1,592 subreddit members found that 33.4% identified as socialists, 33.2% identified as social democrats and progressives, 16.1% identified as anarchists, and 14.4% did not identify as left-wing. The survey found that most members were male and live in North America. The survey also found that 50% of members still work full-time.

== Reception ==
In January 2020, the r/antiwork subreddit had about 70,000 members. In February 2021, 235,000 people were members of r/antiwork, more than double the number of members from March 2020. Huck attributed the subreddit's growth in membership to the COVID-19 pandemic and related events, including a rise in union busting as well as increased acceptance of mutual-aid networks and the four-day workweek. As of December 2021, the subreddit had more than 1.4 million members, a 279% increase from 2020 with a gain of more than 900,000 members in 2021. According to Reddit, r/antiwork was one of the 15 fastest-growing subreddits as of November 24, 2021.

In 2021, opinion pieces in The New York Times, The Guardian, and Vice expressed solidarity with r/antiwork.

In a November 2021 research note, Goldman Sachs cited the subreddit and broader anti-work movement as factors that could lead to a long term decrease in labor force participation.

In a January 2022 article, Bryce Olivas of Socialist Revolution, a publication of the International Marxist Tendency (IMT), generally praised r/antiwork, but criticized the subreddit for its "lack of a class-struggle perspective."

Academic studies of the subreddit have examined its relationship with mainstream media coverage during the Great Resignation and its role in popularizing terms such as "act your wage".

== See also ==
- Great Resignation
- Interpassivity
- Millennial socialism
- Post-work society
- Quiet quitting
- Refusal of work
- Striketober
- Tang ping ("lying flat")
- Wage slavery
- Workism
