= Productivism =

Primacy of productivity and growth

Productivism or growthism is the belief that measurable productivity and growth are the purpose of human organization (e.g., work), and that "more production is necessarily good". Critiques of productivism center primarily on the limits to growth posed by a finite planet and extend into discussions of human procreation, the work ethic, and even alternative energy production.

== Arguments for productivism ==
Although productivism is often meant pejoratively as a general problem in politics and economics, most countries and economies are productivist in nature. While critics of productivism and its political-economic variants, notably capitalism and socialism, challenge the notions of conventional political economy and argue for an economic policy more compatible with humanity, these views are often dismissed as utopian by economists and political scientists, who hold that there is no conflict between the roles of the worker and the citizen. That is, that conventional economics, particularly macroeconomics, already accounts for the relationship between productivity and the freedom to enjoy that productivity.

== Criticism of productivism ==
Anthony Giddens defines productivism as "an ethos in which 'work', as paid employment, has been separated out in a clear-cut way from other domains of life", and further states that work "defines whether or not individuals feel worthwhile or socially valued". Although "productivism" may be considered to be derisive, as the idea is unacceptable to many of the individuals and ideologies that the term is intended to characterise, these same individuals and ideologies often use phrases like "productivity", "growth", "economic sense", and "common sense" (interchangeably) without argument, presupposing the primacy of industry.

According to those who use the term "productivism", the difference between themselves and the promoters of conventional neoclassical economics is that a productivist does not believe in the idea of "uneconomic growth". That is, the productivist believes all growth is good, while the critic of productivism believes it can be more like a disease, measurably growing but interfering with life processes, and that it is up to the electorate, worker, and purchaser to put values on their free time and decide whether to use their time for production or their money for consumption. A key academic critic of productivism is Amartya Sen, winner of the 1999 Nobel Prize in Economics. His theory of "development as freedom" is one of several human development theories that state that the growth of individual capital—that is, "talent", "creativity", and "personal ingenuity"—is more significant than the growth of many other measurable quantities, such as the production of commercial products. In his essays from 1975, the British economist E. F. Schumacher remarked: "Infinite growth in consumption in a world of finite resources is an impossibility. ... When my child grows, I am pleased. When I grow, less so!"

In the 1990s, the American public was told that the United States would become a nation of educated managers and specialists, with industrial labor outsourced to less fortunate countries. Those countries refused to accept that role and Americans have been vying for the few elite roles that were available ever since. According to Samuel P. Huntington, Americans spend more time at work and have worse benefits when compared to similar rich countries. Sleep, repose, and slacking are often marginalized and the environment suffers as a result of a throw-away-society that is supposed to keep people working. Depression and anxiety rates are higher than they were in the 1980s, perhaps because people are working harder to find great jobs that just are not there. With a productivist mindset, free time becomes time to create something impressive to share on social media or develop a skill.

In the United States, people of lower classes are conditioned to believe in meritocracy, despite class mobility in the country being among the lowest in industrialized economies. In the United States, 50% of a father's income position is inherited by his son. In contrast, the amount in Norway or Canada is less than 20%. Moreover, in the U.S. 8% of children raised in the bottom 20% of the income distribution are able to climb to the top 20% as adults, while the figure in Denmark is nearly double at 15%. According to an academic study on why Americans overestimate class mobility, "research indicates that errors in social perception are driven by both informational factors—such as the lack of awareness of statistical information relevant to actual mobility trends—and motivational factors—the desire to believe that society is meritocratic." Americans are more inclined to believe in meritocracy out of the prospect that they will one day join the elite or upper class. Scholars have paralleled this belief to John Steinbeck's notable quote that "the poor see themselves not as an exploited proletariat but as temporarily embarrassed millionaires.” As academic Tad Delay states, "the fantasy of class mobility, of becoming bourgeois, is enough to defend the aristocracy."

People miss the part where it's a zero-sum game for good jobs, good friends, and good partners. For some reason, people's contentment hinges more on relative wealth than absolute wealth, sometimes referred to as the Easterlin paradox. Jobs were not created to be a way of life, they are just clumps of tasks that would not be performed for free because they are too difficult or too boring. Depression is a taboo because it denounces what society has to offer. Depression also suggests the idea that in a society of winners and losers, the losers often can't cope with it, and are simultaneously incapable of becoming winners. The poor are marginalized as are the unemployed for not being productive enough. Critics have pointed out that “being productive” necessitates unhindered access to the means of production, which people don't have.

=== Public assistance ===
Social stigma is prevalent towards recipients of public assistance programs. This includes programs frequently utilized by families struggling with poverty such as Head Start and AFDC (Aid To Families With Dependent Children). The value of self-reliance is often at the center of feelings of shame and the fewer people value self reliance the less stigma affects them psychologically. Stigma towards welfare recipients has been proven to increase passivity and dependency in poor people and has further solidified their status and feelings of inferiority. Caseworkers frequently treat recipients of welfare disrespectfully and make assumptions about deviant behavior and reluctance to work. Many single mothers cited stigma as the primary reason they wanted to exit welfare as quickly as possible. They often feel the need to conceal food stamps to escape judgement associated with welfare programs. Stigma is a major factor contributing to the duration and breadth of poverty in developed societies which largely affects single mothers. Recipients of public assistance are viewed as objects of the community rather than members allowing for them to be perceived as enemies of the community which is how stigma enters collective thought. Amongst single mothers in poverty, lack of health care benefits is one of their greatest challenges in terms of exiting poverty. Traditional values of self reliance increase feelings of shame amongst welfare recipients making them more susceptible to being stigmatized.

== See also ==
- Agricultural productivity
- Anarchism
- Bedtime procrastination
- Consumerism
- Critique of political economy
- Critique of work
- Cycle of poverty
- Degrowth
- Economic mobility
- Eco-socialism
- Green anarchism
- Green growth
- Green parties
- Gross national happiness
- Growth imperative
- Happiness economics
- Human development theory
- Humanistic economics
- Individual capital
- The Limits to Growth
- List of countries by GNI per capita growth
- Keeping up with the Joneses
- Parkinson's law
- Post-growth
- Post-work society
- Progress
- Refusal of work
- Social mobility
- Social stress
- Social stigma
- Workism
