= Father School =

South Korea adult education program

Father School (아버지학교) is a continuing education program for Korean men to counter the traditional authoritarian father types who are workaholic and "not emotionally linked with their children or their wife."

== History ==
Father School started at the Duranno(두란노) Bible College in Seoul during the height of the Asian financial crisis "as an evangelical response to concerns over uninvolved fathers, broken families, materialism and other issues considered contradictory to biblical values."

Father School has operations in 57 American cities and has graduated nearly 200,000 men worldwide since being founded in 1995.
