= Kathi Weeks =

American scholar, Marxist feminist and anti-work theorist

- Known for: The Problem with Work: Feminism, Marxism, Antiwork Politics and Postwork Imaginaries (2011)

Education
- Education: University of Washington

Philosophical work
- Era: 21st-century philosophy
- Region: Western philosophy
- School: Marxist feminism Anti-work; Autonomism
- Institutions: Duke University
- Main interests: Feminist theory · Political theory · Critique of work · Post-work society · subjectivity · capitalism · temporality · universal basic income

Kathi Weeks is an American scholar, Marxist feminist and anti-work theorist. She is best known for The Problem with Work: Feminism, Marxism, Antiwork Politics and Postwork Imaginaries, published in 2011 by Duke University Press.

== Biography ==
She holds a PhD from the University of Washington, and is currently a professor of Gender, Sexuality, and Feminist Studies at Duke University. There, she was from 2012 to 2015 the Director of Graduate Studies in Women, and in 2018 the Director of Graduate Studies in the Program In Gender, Sexuality & Feminist Studies.

In 1998 she published Constituting Feminist Subjects, and in 2000 she co-edited with Michael Hardt the volume The Jameson Reader, on cultural theorist Fredric Jameson. She gained prominence with the publication in 2011 of The Problem with Work: Feminism, Marxism, Antiwork Politics and Postwork Imaginaries. The book uses Marxist social reproduction theory, including Wages for Housework and autonomist literature, to question that work is necessarily a social good. She argues in favor of a post-work society where people do not see their creativity or political agency bound by employment relations. This includes a defense of a universal basic income on Marxist feminist grounds.

== Books ==
=== As author ===
- Constituting Feminist Subjects (Cornell University Press, 1998). Re-published in 2018 by Verso Books.
- The Problem with Work: Feminism, Marxism, Antiwork Politics and Postwork Imaginaries (Duke University Press, 2011).

=== As editor ===
- The Jameson Reader (with Michael Hardt) (Blackwell, 2000).
