= IKEA effect =

Cognitive bias

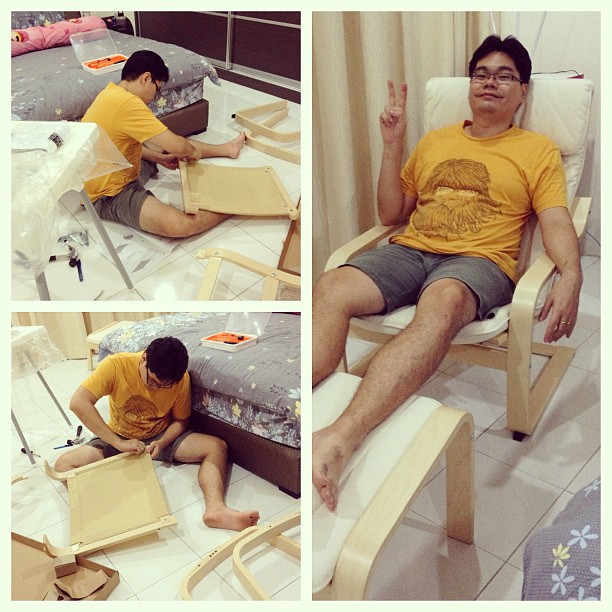
A man assembling and then sitting on an Ikea Poäng chair

The IKEA effect is a cognitive bias in which consumers place a disproportionately high value on products they partially created. The name refers to Swedish manufacturer and furniture retailer IKEA, which sells many items of furniture that require assembly.

A 2011 study found that subjects were willing to pay 63% more for furniture they had assembled themselves than for equivalent pre-assembled items.

== History and background ==
The IKEA effect was identified and named by Michael I. Norton of Harvard Business School, Daniel Mochon of Yale, and Dan Ariely of Duke, who published the results of three studies in 2011. They described the IKEA effect as "labor alone can be sufficient to induce greater liking for the fruits of one's labor: even constructing a standardized bureau, an arduous, solitary task, can lead people to overvalue their (often poorly constructed) creations."

Norton, Mochon, and Ariely cited other researchers' previous work on "effort justification" which had demonstrated that the more effort someone put into something, the more someone will value it. This phenomenon had been observed by Leon Festinger (1957) and in realms ranging from psychotherapy (Axsom & Cooper, 1985) to brainwashing (Schein, 1956).

Product designers were familiar with the IKEA effect long before it was given a name. Norton and his colleagues noted that, while not yet named or scientifically established, it had been recognized by marketers for a long time. Norton and his fellow researchers cited the Build-a-Bear product, which allows people to make their own teddy bears. Many consumers enjoy this option, even though they are charged a high price for a product for which, thanks to their labor, the manufacturer does not have to pay production costs. In addition, the researchers pointed out the popularity of "haycations," whereby city people pay to do farmers' work for them. In all these cases, the researchers posit, people seem more willing to pay for an item into which they have put a degree of their own labor.

The researchers pointed out that as a result of earlier consumer psychology studies that essentially pointed to the existence of the IKEA effect, many firms transitioned from viewing consumers as "recipients of value" to instead "co-creators of value." One element of this shift was the involvement of consumers in product design, marketing, and testing.

A 1959 study by Aronson and Mills that has been described as a "classic" produced results that seem to reflect either the IKEA effect or a closely related phenomenon. Female participants were required to undergo "no initiation, a mild initiation, or severe initiation" before entering a discussion group. The women's later appraisal of the group's value was proportional to the effort that had been demanded of them before being allowed into the group.

Citing other researchers' work demonstrating "a fundamental human need for effectance—an ability to successfully produce desired outcomes in one's environment," Norton et al. argued that "one means by which people accomplish this goal is by affecting and controlling objects and possessions." They placed special emphasis on Bandura's "seminal" 1977 study showing that "successful completion of tasks" was a "crucial means by which people can meet their goal to feel competent and in control."

== Experiments by Norton et al. ==
Norton and his colleagues conducted research to find out if consumers would pay higher prices for products that required self-assembly. The research consisted of three different experiments in which the participants built Lego items, folded origami figures and assembled IKEA boxes.

In the first part of the experiment, part of the subjects were given the task of assembling IKEA furniture, while others were allowed to examine a pre-built version of the same furniture. Researchers then asked the participants to price the items. The results showed that the subjects who built the furniture were willing to pay 63% more than the ones who were given pre-built furniture.

In a second part of the experiment, researchers asked subjects to make either origami frogs or cranes, following a provided instruction sheet. They then asked the subjects how much they were willing to pay for their own work. Researchers then gathered another group of subjects who had not taken part in the origami creation. The new subjects were asked how much they were willing to pay for an origami built by the participants. Following this, the researchers displayed origami made by experts to another set of non-builders and asked them how much they were willing to pay for it. It was found that the builders were willing to pay about five times more for their own creation than the non-builders were, as expected from the first part of the experiment. When asked how much somebody else would pay for their origami, the builders also gave a high price to their work, showing that they actually think that the origami has a high value. The second set of non-builders were willing to pay for the well-crafted origami about as much as the builders were willing to pay for their origami.

The third and final experiment involved two sets of subjects. The first set were told to completely assemble a piece of IKEA furniture. The second set were also instructed to assemble a piece of IKEA furniture, but only partially. Both groups then took part in bidding over these objects. Results showed that individuals who had built the box completely were willing to pay more than the individuals who had only partially built an item.

=== Conclusions ===
The experiments by Norton and his colleagues demonstrated that self-assembly affects the evaluation of a product by its consumers. The results suggest that when people construct a particular product themselves, even if they do a poor job of it, they value the end result more than if they had not put any effort into its creation.

Participants, wrote Norton and his colleagues, "saw their amateurish creations as similar in value to experts' creations, and expected others to share their opinions." To be sure, "labor leads to love only when labor results in successful completion of tasks; when participants built and then destroyed their creations, or failed to complete them, the IKEA effect dissipated." The researchers also concluded "that labor increases valuation for both 'do-it-yourselfers' and novices."

The researchers noted that their use of "simple IKEA boxes and Lego sets that did not permit customization" did not prevent participants from manifesting the IKEA effect.

== Later research ==
Gibbs and Drolet (2008) showed that raising consumers' energy levels can persuade them to select experiences that involve greater effort. But companies have been warned not to challenge consumers too much, lest they be unable to complete a task and thus end up dissatisfied.

Research by Dahl and Moreau (2007) suggests that customers are more satisfied when there is a limit to the amount of creativity they can express in assembling a product.

== Underlying mechanisms ==
Norton et al. mentions three key underlying mechanisms in the study. One key underlying mechanism of the IKEA effect mentioned in Norton et al.'s study is competence also known as effectance. Effectance is a fundamental human need, it is "an ability to successfully produce desired outcomes in one's environment" Norton et al. suggests that the "increase in liking that occurs due to effort coupled with the positive feelings of effectance that accompany successful completion of tasks is an important driver of the increase in willingness to pay"; thus, greater IKEA effect. "Effectance itself has two psychological components: actual control over outcomes and mere perceived control over outcomes." Norton et al.'s study covers both components of effectance as "the participants are in "control" by building their own products yet assembling them according to preset instructions (i.e. "not in control")." This is evidence of perceived and actual control explaining the underlying mechanisms of the IKEA effect. This finding aligns with previous literature as Bandura's seminal research on self-efficacy (1977) also found that successful completion of tasks allows people to feel competent and in control.

Another underlying mechanism of the IKEA effect is social utility. The impact of social utility on the IKEA effect depends on the type of product being assembled – hedonic or utilitarian. Hedonic products are focused on providing pleasure and enjoyment such as Legos or origami. Utilitarian products are purchased for practical functions such as IKEA boxes. In Norton et al.'s study, "participants who built Legos and origami mentioned a desire to show them to their friends, suggesting that the increase in willingness-to-pay for hedonic products may arise in part due to the social utility of displaying one's creation to others offered by assembling these products." In contrast, "social utility is likely to play a more minor role in increased liking for self-assembled utilitarian products like the storage boxes."

Finally, Norton et al. also briefly touched on enjoyment as a possible underlying mechanism of the IKEA effect. The more enjoyment the construction task brings, the higher the valuation is likely to be.

Ling et al.'s study identified self-expression with aesthetic preference and self-esteem as two boundary conditions as an underlying mechanism of the IKEA effect in self-expressive mass customisation. To what extent of choice in mass customisation toolkits have an impact on perceived value of self-designed products, how self-expression mediates this effect, and what kind of consumers are more inclined to experience the IKEA effect were examined. Ling et al., found that the IKEA effect is more pronounced among romanticism-propending and high self-esteem consumers resulting in increased valuation of the self-designed product. This is because "romanticism-propending consumers appreciate creativity and originality" as opposed to classicism-propending consumers. In addition, "individuals with high self-esteem in contrast with low self-esteem tend to have high confidence and creativity, and stronger motivation to maintain their social self in the eyes of others." Therefore, Ling et al.'s study suggests consumer characteristics including creativity, confidence, and motivation to maintain one's social self are important underlying mechanisms of the IKEA effect.

Other possible explanations for the IKEA effect have been suggested, such as "a focus on the product's positive attributes, and the relationship between effort and liking." The IKEA effect is one of several cognitive biases that seem to reflect a causative link between perceived effort and valuation.

== Conceptual replication ==
Sarstedt et al. conducted a conceptual replication of the Norton et al.'s IKEA effect study in 2016. Instead of IKEA boxes, Legos, and origami, Sarstedt et al. used loom bands. There were five experiment groups (EG) in Sarstedt et al.'s study: EG1, the control group who did not receive a treatment but asked to choose one of the predesigned loom bands and to write an essay about their thought and feelings when inspecting the loom band. EG2 assembled a loom band with assembly instructions, replicating the limited customisation condition in Norton et al.'s experiment. Writing the essay or making the loom band was to measure the participants psychological ownership, pride, and willingness-to-pay for the loom band using the Becker-DeGroot-Marschak (BDM) mechanism, also used in Norton et al.'s original study. EG3, 4, and 5 also assembled a loom band. However, EG3 were told that a start-up company would consider the best designs for production which triggered the participants' perception of the impact on corporate decision (i.e. customer empowerment). EG4 only completed half of the assembly task, testing the effect of incompletion on the IKEA effect. EG5 had to disassemble their designs upon completion to test the effect of destruction on the IKEA effect.

Sarstedt et al.'s study results supported the robustness of the original effect as EG2 participants expressed higher willingness-to-pay and level of psychological ownership for the loom bands than EG1 participants. EG3 participants in the empowerment context also reported a significantly higher willingness-to-pay and psychological ownership than EG1 participants. Nonetheless, evidence that empowerment leads to greater IKEA effect was not observed as EG3 only had a marginal increase in willingness-to-pay and psychological ownership than EG2 participants. The comparison between EG3 and 4 displayed that incompletion results in reduced willingness-to-pay and psychological ownership, but the effect was insignificant. On the contrary, the comparison between EG3 and 5 revealed that destruction of created products crucially reduces participants' willingness-to-pay and psychological ownership. In conclusion, Sarstedt et al.'s conceptual replication study supports the original study's findings except that incompletion of the task does not significantly reduce the IKEA effect in a customer empowerment context. Therefore, Norton et al.'s study is a highly replicable study, further confirming the generalisability and reliability of the IKEA effect.

== Application ==
The IKEA effect can contribute to reducing panic selling. Investors typically reduce their stock market exposure after a financial crash which often results in "buy high, sell low" strategy that is detrimental to long-run wealth accumulation. Ashtiani et al.'s study proposes a nudge utilising the IKEA effect to counteract this phenomenon: "actively involving investors in the selection process of the risky investments, while restricting their selections in a way that preserves a large degree of diversification."

A group of participants were given the chance to choose their own investments, and another group had a portfolio constructed by a financial advisor. Ashtiani et al.'s findings show that investors who chose their own portfolios are less likely to sell their risky assets and are more committed to their initial asset allocation. In fact, "31% of the participants in the advised group decided to sell their risky assets whereas only 10% of the participants who had chosen their own portfolio wanted to reduce the share of risky assets." The findings supports the IKEA effect – the investors value the "self-assembled" portfolios more because the effort they put into organising the portfolio increases the personal valuation of the assets. Hence, allowing subjects to contribute to the selection process of the assets is an effective strategy to reduce panic selling.

The IKEA effect is thought to contribute to the sunk costs effect, which occurs when managers continue to devote resources to sometimes failing projects they have invested their labor in. The effect is also related to the "not invented here" (or "NIH", or even "NIH syndrome"), where managers disregard good ideas developed elsewhere, in favor of (possibly inferior) internally developed ideas.

Writer Tyler Tervooren realized that he was witnessing an example of the IKEA effect when he toured a house that was for sale at a price that was "at least $30,000 too much" and discovered that the reason why the owner overvalued the house so dramatically was that she had "had the home built herself and customized every aspect of it to her taste." But while she regarded the house as "a masterpiece," Tervooren "saw a house like any other but with paint colors I'd never choose." Tervooren realized that he, too, had fallen victim to the IKEA effect on various occasions: "I had a special bond with my old car because I always worked on it myself. And when my iPhone broke down last year, I pulled it apart and learned to fix it so I could keep using it."

The IKEA effect may be said to manifest itself in situations when programmers have been invited to help (without payment) in creating open-source programs and operating systems, such as Linux.

=== Animals ===
The IKEA effect has also been observed in animals, such as rats and starlings, which prefer to obtain food from sources that required effort on their part (Kacelnik & Marsh, 2002; Lawrence & Festinger, 1962).

=== Business ===
Tervooren has advised business owners that they "can reap massive rewards by putting the IKEA effect to work for your customers. Whenever you can, let them customize the products and services you offer to fit their needs. Make them feel like their own creativity and effort went into getting what they need from you. They'll pay more for it."

=== Consumers ===
Norton and his colleagues warned that the IKEA effect could lead people to overvalue their own belongings when offering them for sale. For example, "people may see the improvements they have made to their homes—such as the brick walkways they laid by hand—as increasing the value of the house far more than buyers, who see only a shoddily-built walkway."

On the other hand, a 2012 article in Psychology Today suggested that "if you're having a hard time deciding between buying something pre-built or putting it together yourself, the extra work that might not seem worth it now might very well put a smile on your face when it's all done. Saving yourself the labor could just cost you some happiness."

== See also ==
- Dunning–Kruger effect
- Effort justification
- Escalation of commitment
- Omission bias
- Pygmalion effect
