= Noboru Nakamura (disambiguation) =

Noboru Nakamura may refer to:

- Noboru Nakamura (1913–1981), Japanese film director
- Noboru Nakamura (designer), Japanese designer responsible for the IKEA Poäng chair
