= Swedish Public Employment Service =

Swedish government agency

- Arbetsförmedlingen

Agency overview
- Formed: 1 January 2008
- Preceding agency: Swedish Labour Market Agency
- Jurisdiction: Sweden
- Headquarters: Stockholm
- Employees: 13,700 (2018)
- Website: www.arbetsformedlingen.se

The Swedish Public Employment Service (Swedish: Arbetsförmedlingen) is a Swedish government agency organized under the Ministry of Employment mainly responsible for the public employment service in Sweden and the implementation of labour market policies.

== Roles ==
The agency helps facilitating meetings and bring together employers with job seekers, especially those who are long-term unemployed and have particular difficulties in finding work.

In addition, the agency should work to increase employment in the long term.

This is primarily done by giving active support to companies in the recruitment process, facilitating meetings at the premises of the Swedish Public Employment Service and the use of a searchable, gratis vacancy database (Swedish: Platsbanken).

The agency has a special responsibility to work with the Swedish Social Insurance Agency (Swedish: Försäkringskassan) to help those with reduced working capacity back to employment.

Newly arrived immigrants and refugees have the right to participate in different measures and programmes. In some cases, the agency can give economic compensation, such as wage subsidies, to employers.

The agency has an additional responsibility to monitor job seekers to prevent benefit and insurance fraud, and should provide unemployment forecasts and statistics to the government.

== History ==
The agency used to sort under the now defunct Swedish Labour Market Agency (Swedish: Arbetsmarknadsverket, AMV) and its offices belonged to the county labour boards, until it was decided that it should form its own agency under Ministry of Employment in 2008.

== Organisation ==
In 2018, the agency had 13,000 employees, in 242 local offices, grouped into eleven market areas, currently led by Director-General Maria Hemström Hemmingsson, from the head office in Stockholm.

As a consequence of a political deal between the minority government and parts of the opposition the agency had its budget severely cut in the end of 2018. On 30 January 2019, 4,500 of the employees were given their notice.

== See also ==
- Ministry of Employment (Sweden)
- Unemployment benefits in Sweden
- Social audit
- Swedish Public Freedom Service
