= Workaholic =

Person who works compulsively

A workaholic is a person who works compulsively. A workaholic experiences an inability to limit the amount of time they spend on work despite negative consequences such as damage to their relationships or health.

There is no generally accepted medical definition of this condition, although some forms of stress, impulse control disorder, obsessive–compulsive personality disorder, and obsessive–compulsive disorder can be work-related; ergomania is defined as "excessive devotion to work especially as a symptom of mental illness".

The phenomenon of hustle culture, while disregarding healthy work–life balance, may exacerbate workaholism.

== Etymology ==
The word itself is a portmanteau word composed of work and alcoholic. Its first known appearance, according to the Oxford English Dictionary, came in Canada in the Toronto Daily Star of April 5, 1947, page 6, with a punning allusion to Alcoholics Anonymous:

If you are cursed with an unconquerable craving for work, call Workaholics Synonymous, and a reformed worker will aid you back to happy idleness.

== Details ==
The term workaholic refers to various types of behavioral patterns, with each having its own valuation. For instance, workaholism is sometimes used by people wishing to express their devotion to their career in positive terms. The "work" in question is usually associated with a paying job, but it may also refer to independent pursuits such as sports, music, art, and science. However, the term is more often used to refer to a negative behavioral pattern that is popularly characterized by spending an excessive amount of time on working, an inner compulsion to work hard and a neglect of family and other social relations.

Researchers have found that in many cases, incessant work-related activity continues even after impacting the subject's relationships and physical health. Causes of it are thought to be anxiety, low self-esteem, and intimacy problems. Furthermore, workaholics tend to have an inability to delegate work tasks to others and tend to obtain high scores on personality traits such as neuroticism, perfectionism, and conscientiousness.

Clinical psychologist Bryan E. Robinson identifies two axes for workaholics: work initiation and work completion. He associates the behavior of procrastination with both "Savoring Workaholics" (those with low work initiation/low work completion) and "Attention-Deficit Workaholics" (those with high work initiation and low work completion), in contrast to "Bulimic" and "Relentless" workaholics – both of whom have high work completion.

Workaholism in Japan is considered a serious social problem leading to early death, often on the job, a phenomenon dubbed karōshi. Overwork was popularly blamed for the fatal stroke of Prime Minister of Japan Keizō Obuchi, in the year 2000. Death from overwork is not a uniquely Japanese phenomenon; in 2013, a Bank of America intern in London died after working for 72 hours straight.

Workaholics tend to be less effective than other workers because they have difficulty working as part of a team, trouble delegating or entrusting co-workers or organizational problems due to taking on too much work at once. Moreover, workaholics often suffer sleep deprivation, which results in impaired brain and cognitive function.

The business risk that workaholism presents is an underestimated risk in companies and human resources management, which can develop into a threat to a business.

== See also ==
- Critique of work
- Crunch (video games)
- Downshifting (lifestyle)
- Karoshi
- Management of depression
- Occupational burnout
- OCPD
- Overachiever
- Power harassment
- Presenteeism
- Protestant work ethic
- Refusal of work
- Slacker
- Slow movement (culture)
- Workaholics Anonymous
- Work ethic
- Workism
- Workplace stress
