= 2021 Kellogg's strike =

2021 labor strike by employees of the food manufacturer Kellogg's

- Part of Striketober
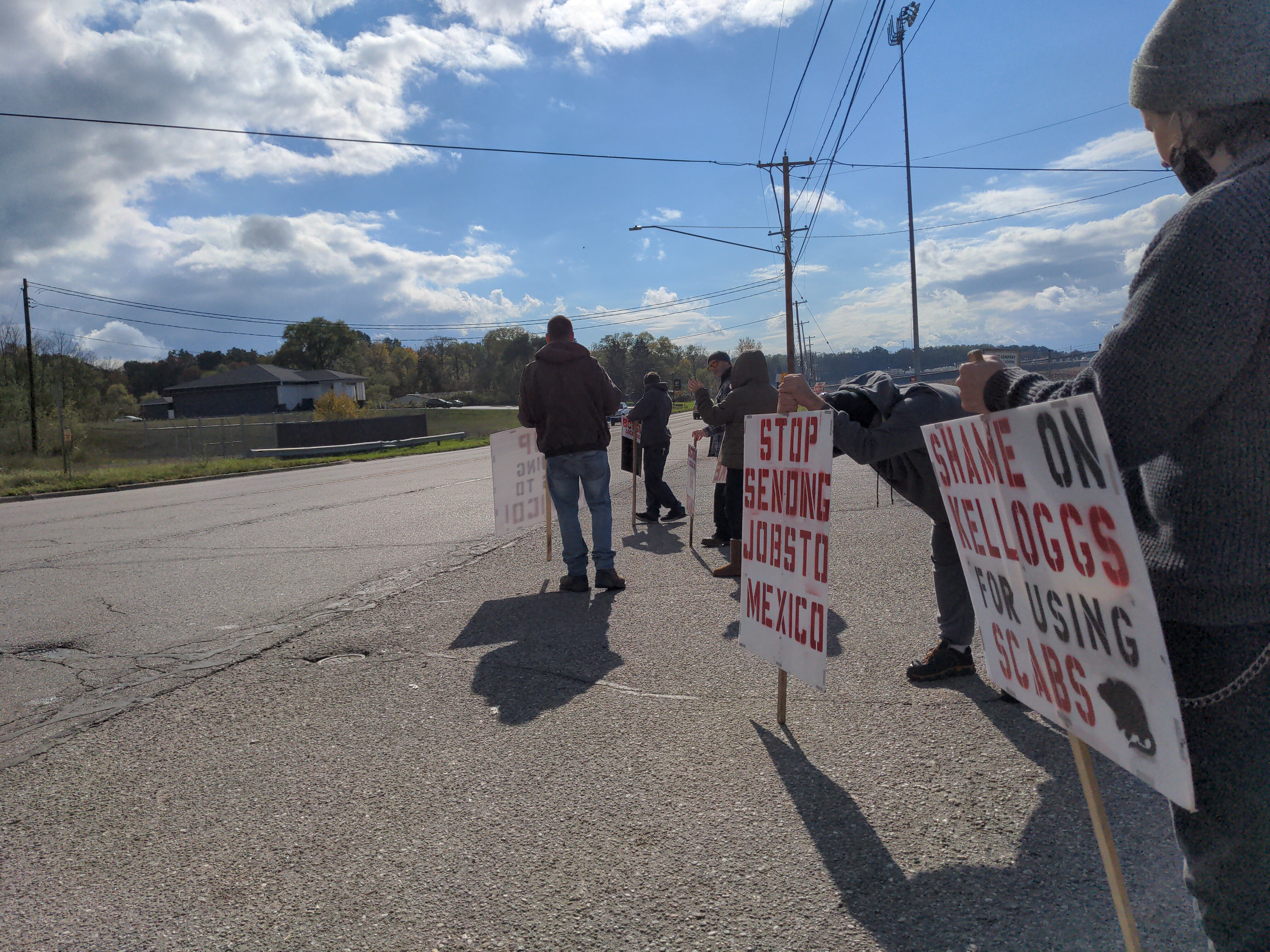
- Workers picketing on October 31, 2021, in Battle Creek, Michigan
- Date: October 5 – December 21, 2021
- Location: United States: Battle Creek, Michigan; Omaha, Nebraska; Lancaster, Pennsylvania; Memphis, Tennessee
- Caused by: Disagreements over terms of a new labor contract
- Methods: Picketing; Strike action

Parties
| Bakery, Confectionery, Tobacco Workers and Grain Millers' International Union: Local 3G (Battle Creek); Local 374G (Lancaster); Local 252G (Memphis); Local 50G (Omaha) | The Kellogg Company |

The 2021 Kellogg's strike was a labor strike started on October 5, 2021, and ended December 21, 2021, involving about 1,400 workers for food manufacturer Kellogg's, unionized as members of the Bakery, Confectionery, Tobacco Workers and Grain Millers' International Union (BCTGM). The strike was caused due to disagreements between the union and company concerning the terms of a new labor contract, with particular points of contention concerning the current two-tier wage system (with legacy workers making $35/hr and new hires $22/hr), health care, holidays, retirement benefits, cost-of-living adjustments, and vacation time. The strike affected all of Kellogg's cereal-producing plants in the United States, consisting of plants in Battle Creek, Michigan; Omaha, Nebraska; Lancaster, Pennsylvania; and Memphis, Tennessee. It is one of several strikes conducted by the BCTGM in 2021, including strike action against Frito-Lay and Nabisco.

The strike is the first to affect Kellogg's Battle Creek plant since 1972, and the first at the Lancaster plant since 1985. The strike ended after union workers voted to approve a new five-year labor contract.

== Background ==
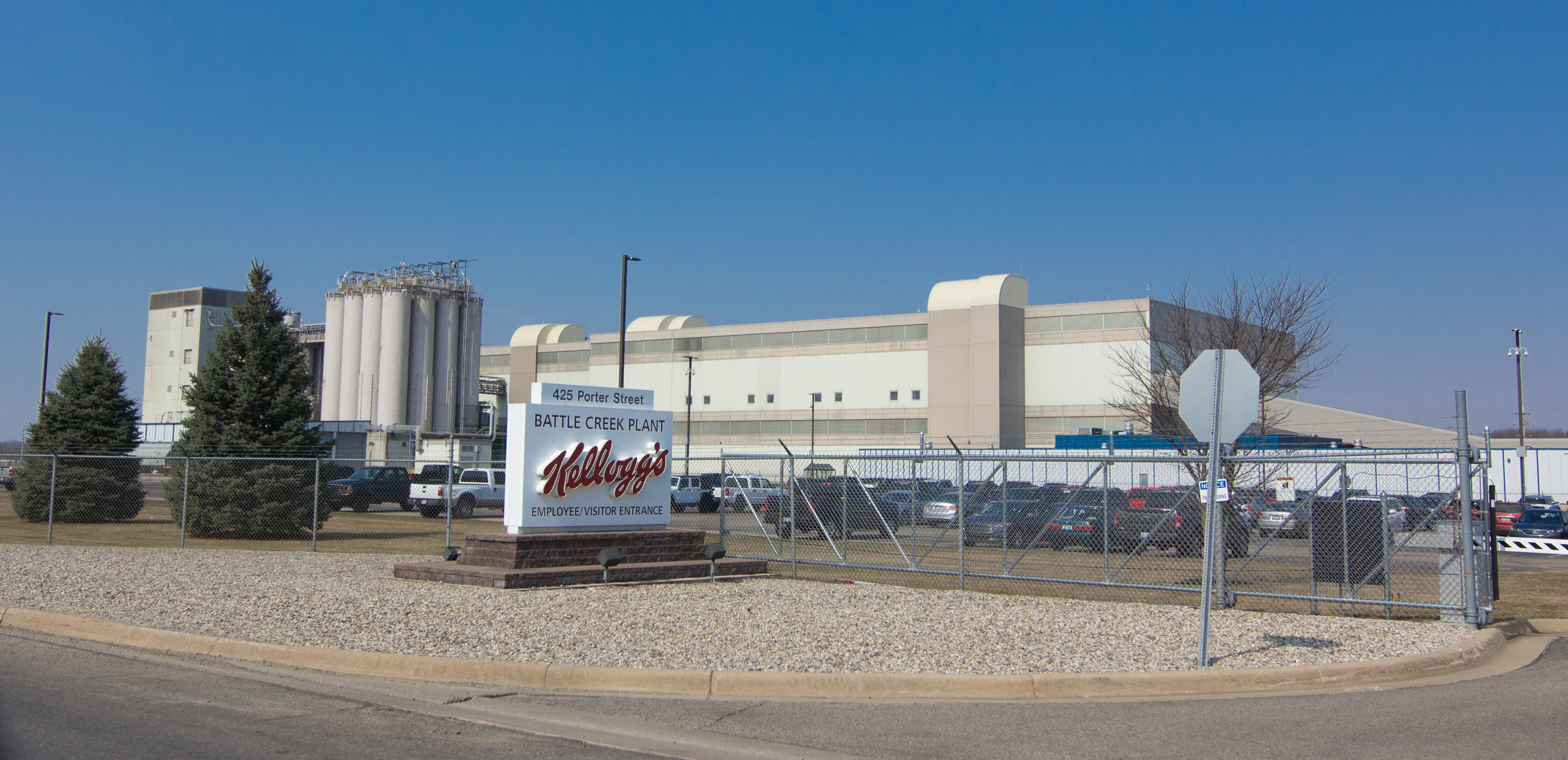
Kellogg's Battle Creek plant, 2019

Kellogg's is an American food manufacturer that derives about a third of its profits from its line of breakfast cereals, which includes brands such as Froot Loops and Frosted Flakes. In the United States, the company operated four cereal-producing plants in Battle Creek, Michigan (also where the company is headquartered); Omaha, Nebraska; Lancaster, Pennsylvania; and Memphis, Tennessee. Going into October 2021, the company had been negotiating for over a year with the Bakery, Confectionery, Tobacco Workers and Grain Millers' International Union (BCTGM), a labor union that represents about 1,400 workers at these plants. The union and company had had a rough relationship over the past several years, with the company performing a lockout at their Memphis plant in 2013 and 2014, firing about 187 workers at their Battle Creek plant in 2018, and in September 2021, announcing that they would be firing about another 200 employees from that plant, a majority of whom would be union employees. One worker, describing the situation at the Lancaster plant, compared it to a "death of a thousand cuts". While the contract between the union and company had expired in 2020, an extension renewed the existing contract until October 2021.

On September 8 and 9, 2021, both sides submitted their proposals for a new contract and entered into discussions on them. However, during the negotiations, the parties could not agree on several key issues, including policies regarding health care, holidays, retirement benefits, and vacation time. In particular, Kellogg's was seeking to expand a two-tier employee system composed of "legacy" and "transitional" employees. According to the company, legacy employees average $35 per hour, and newer "transitional" employees make $22 per hour. Under the system that had been in place in the prior five-year contract, transitional employees received less pay and reduced benefits compared to the legacy employees, but only 30% of all employees could be classified as transitional. Kellogg's, however, was seeking to remove this cap, which the union alleged would cause a majority of employees to become classified as transitional. The union was opposed to these changes and also stated that the company was threatening to move some production work to Mexico if these changes were not implemented. In response, Omaha, Nebraska BCTGM local president Dan Osborn said: "A lot of Americans probably don't have too much issue with the Nike or Under Armor hats being made elsewhere or even our vehicles, but when they start manufacturing our food down where they are out of the FDA control and OSHA control, I have a huge problem with that." In addition, the president of BCTGM Local 3G stated that the company was seeking to remove cost-of-living adjustments and stop offering pensions to new employees.

== Course of the strike ==
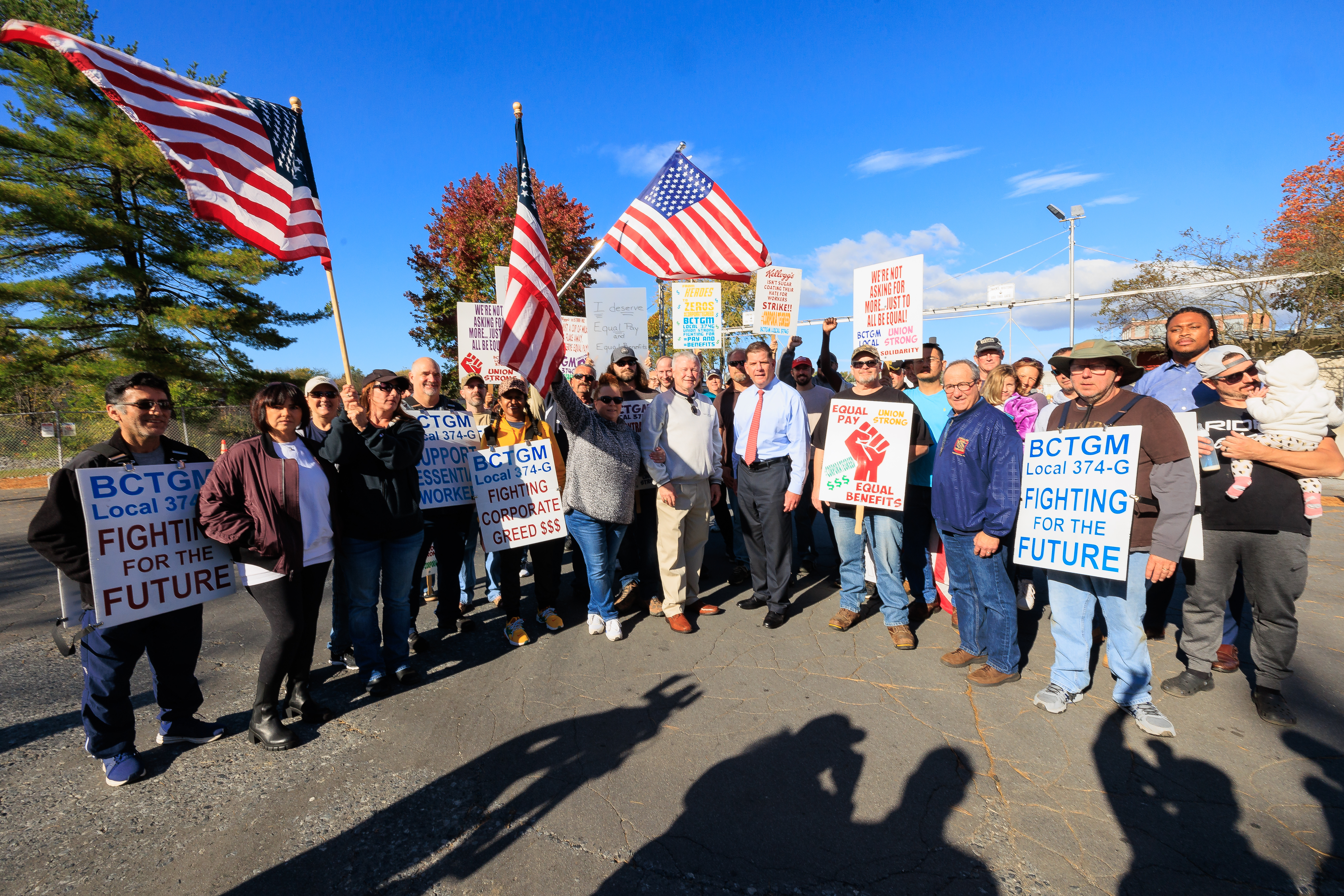
U.S. Secretary of Labor Marty Walsh with workers on strike on October 27, 2021, at the Lancaster, Pennsylvania plant

The strike began at 1:00 a.m. the next day, October 5, 2021, with picketing commencing outside Kellogg's facilities. The strike affected all four of Kellogg's American production facilities, with all of them ceasing operations. The same day, the company stated that they were "implementing contingency plans" to reduce supply disruptions, with one union member stating that the company would try to bring in strikebreakers. The company later clarified that they would be using "salaried employees and third-party resources" to cover for the strikers. Additionally, Newsweek reported that whether the strike would significantly affect supply of Kellogg's products remained unclear. Shortly after the start of the strike, Battle Creek Mayor Mark Behnke urged both sides to return to negotiations. Speaking to HuffPost, a union spokesperson stated that while the union was not officially instituting a boycott, "supporters and consumers could certainly support the Kellogg workers and their fight for a fair contract by choosing NOT to buy Kellogg cereals while the strike is ongoing." According to the union, the strike was open-ended and would continue until a new contract was agreed to. On October 11, third-party contractors began to arrive at Kellogg's plants to serve as replacements for the striking workers. The next day, Kellogg's issued a press release in which they clarified the "myths" and "facts" of the contract proposal and working conditions at their plants. Following this, the president of Omaha's Local 50G stated that he was recommending strikers return to work for a 90-day period under the terms of the previous contract while a new contract could be ratified. Despite this, a negotiator for Local 50G stated on October 13 that negotiations remained at an impasse. That same day, a large rally was held near the factory that was attended by strike supporters and members of several other labor union groups, including members of the AFL–CIO's Omaha Federation of Labor. The rally's speaker was the president emeritus of that federation, who had previously worked at the Kellogg's plant. Around this same time, a photograph of a striker picketing through a torrential rainstorm in Omaha on October 12 went viral online, with many sharing the image and commenting in support of the strike.

On October 14, several members of the Nebraska Legislature, including Carol Blood, Megan Hunt, Mike McDonnell, and Tony Vargas, issued a press release in support of the strikers and urging Kellogg's to bargain in good faith with the union. The next day, Newsweek reported that Kellogg's had released an advertisement seeking replacement workers willing to "cross the picket line" and help with production while the strike was occurring, with the ad stating, "While these are temporary positions at this time, they could lead to permanent opportunities in the future."

=== Proposed agreement ===
On December 2, Kellogg's management and the BCTGM leadership announced a tentative agreement for a five-year contract, which would have raised wages by 3% for longtime workers and put in place standard wage rates for all employees ranked as "in transition", the proposition starting salaries at $22.76 for when workers are hired and receiving a $0.90 raise per year, for the 6 first years. The agreement would also give all transitional employees a promotion to legacy if they had worked for the company for 4 years, and would have included enhanced dental and vision benefits for all workers. Transitional employees would also gain additional vacation time based on their tenure with the company. However, the contract would have also preserved the two-tiered wage system favored by company management, the removal of which was the primary objective of the union.

=== Announcement of replacement of workers ===
The union membership overwhelmingly rejected the tentative agreement in a December 5 vote. Following the vote, on December 7, Kellogg's management announced they would seek to replace all 1,400 striking workers.

=== Ending of strike ===
On December 21, about 1,400 Kellogg workers approved a collective bargaining agreement, ending the strike, which had lasted 77 days.

== Boycott and social media backlash ==
After various calls on social media, made after the announcement that workers would be fired, a boycott was initiated. The subreddit r/antiwork, devoted to discussions on worker exploitation by the rich and powerful, began a campaign in solidarity with striking workers to flood Kellogg's job application site when Kellogg's opened up applications to replace striking workers. Reddit users also created automated scripts and defeated attempts by Kellogg's to block automated applications. When this made recruiting replacement workers difficult, Kellogg's switched to hiring through staffing agencies instead of direct recruitment. A spokesperson for Kellogg's denied claims that the website had crashed, and said that the hiring process was "fully operational". President Joe Biden raised ethical concerns over Kellogg's behavior, stating "permanently replacing striking workers is an existential attack on the union and its members' jobs and livelihoods" and that he has "long opposed permanent striker replacements and...strongly [supports] legislation that would ban that practice".

== Plant closure ==
In August 2024, Kellogg's announced that the Omaha plant would close before the end of 2026, and operations in Memphis were to be scaled back.

== See also ==
- Dan Osborn
- Strikes during the COVID-19 pandemic
