= Michael Norton (professor) =

American professor

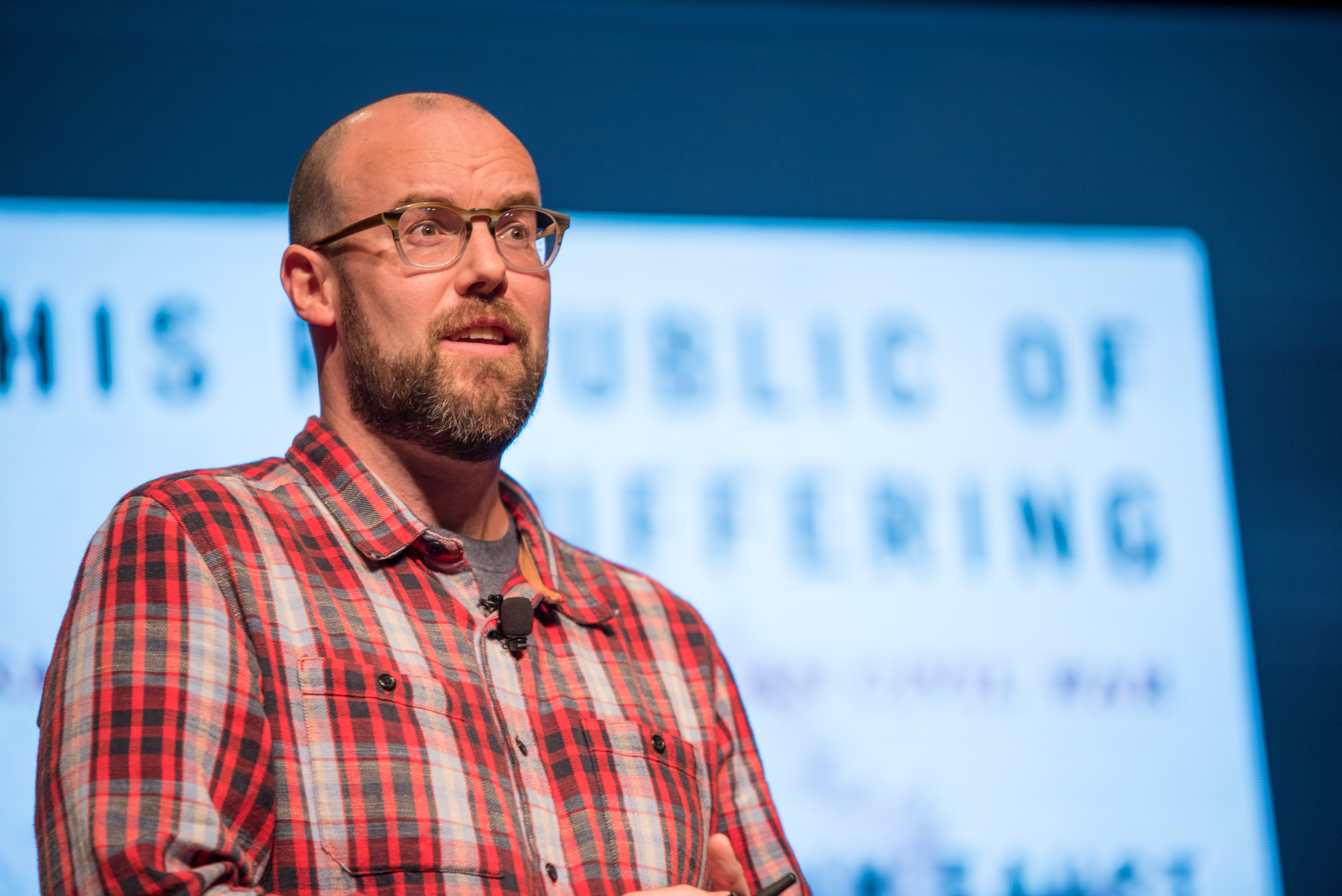
- Norton in 2017
- Born: Michael Irwin Norton; April 17, 1975 (age 51)
- Education: Williams College (B.A., 1997), Princeton University (Ph.D., 2002)
- Scientific career
- Fields: Psychology, business administration
- Workplaces: Harvard Business School
- Thesis: Moral casuistry and the justification of biased judgment (2002)
- Doctoral advisor: John M. Darley

Michael Irwin Norton (born April 17, 1975) is the Harold M. Brierley Professor of Business Administration at Harvard Business School. He is also known for identifying and naming the IKEA effect.

== Education ==
Norton received his B.A. from Williams College in 1997 and his Ph.D. from Princeton University in 2002.

== Career ==
Norton worked at the Massachusetts Institute of Technology as a postdoctoral fellow from 2002 to 2005 in both the MIT Sloan School of Management and MIT Media Lab. He joined the Harvard Business School in 2005 as an assistant professor, and became an associate professor there in 2010. In 2014, he was appointed Harold M. Brierley Professor of Business Administration there.

== Research ==
Norton is known for studying the effect of social factors on people's views and behavior, as well as the psychology of investment and individuals' valuing of goods. He has also studied the psychology underlying individuals' spending decisions, and he has said that spending on experiences tends to make people happier than does spending on objects. His research on this subject has also shown that people become happier when they spend money on others than when they spend it on themselves. He has also researched subjects such as public perceptions of executive compensation, racism, and (with Dan Ariely) economic inequality in the United States. In 2016, he co-authored a study showing that air rage incidents were almost four times as common on planes with first-class cabins than on planes without them. The study was published in the Proceedings of the National Academy of Sciences the following year.
