= Bryan E. Robinson =

American writer and psychotherapist (born 1945)

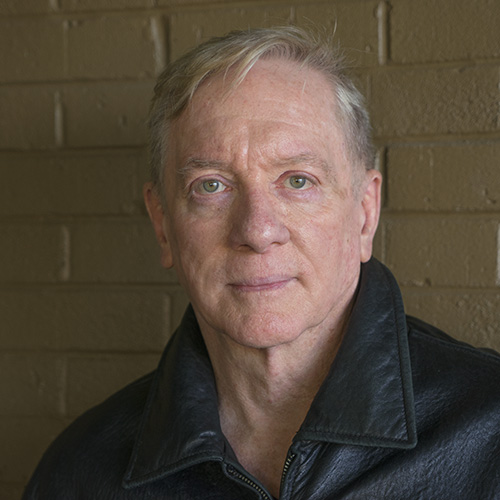
- Robinson in 2016
- Born: 1945 (age 80–81)
- Education: Ph.D.
- Alma mater: University of North Carolina
- Occupations: Writer, psychotherapist, and academic
- Website: bryanrobinsonbooks.com

Bryan E. Robinson is an American writer, psychotherapist, and professor emeritus at the University of North Carolina at Charlotte currently living in Asheville, NC. He is a graduate of East Carolina University and the University of North Carolina system and author of two novels and over 40 nonfiction books and Professor of Counseling and Child Development at the University of North Carolina at Charlotte for 25 years... At UNC-Charlotte, he conducted the first research studies on children of workaholics and the effects of workaholism on marriage and the family. Robinson is best known for his book, Chained to the Desk: A Guidebook for Workaholics, Their Partners and Children and the Clinicians Who Treat Them (2014, its third edition). He is noted for his identification of two axes for workaholics: work initiation and work completion. He associates the behavior of procrastination with both "Savoring Workaholics" (those with low work initiation/low work completion) and "Attention-Deficit Workaholics" (those with high work initiation and low work completion), in contrast to "Bulimic" and "Relentless" workaholics - both of whom have high work completion. He is widely recognized as being one of the world's leading experts on workaholism. He is also known for developing the Work Addiction Risk Test (WART) a psychometric tool used to measure work addiction used clinically and in research worldwide to identify workaholism. He has lectured on his pioneering research on workaholism and work/life balance across the United States and throughout the world: Sweden, Russia, Norway, Hong Kong, England, Canada, and Australia, and his books have been translated into thirteen languages: Arabic, Korean, Turkish, Hebrew, German, French, Chinese, Portuguese, Spanish, Italian, Polish, Japanese, and Russian.

== Work ==
Robinson's early work included his publications on men in day care, teenage dads, and gay fathers. His interests turned to the field of addiction and recovery. When he realized there was no information on workaholism especially as it related to the family, Robinson and his research team launched a series of studies, the first of their kind, to examine the influence of work addiction on family functioning and to develop an empirical instrument to measure work addiction

== Awards ==
In 1989, during his tenure as Professor at the University of North Carolina at Charlotte, Robinson won the First Citizens Scholars Medal given annually to faculty for outstanding scholarship and a distinguished record in research. In 1998 Robinson's research on workaholism and the family was recognized by the American Counseling Association which honored him with the ACA Extended Research Award for conducting high-quality research over an extended period of time in areas of concern and interest to the counseling profession. Among his other honors are several literary awards for his Southern noir debut novel, Limestone Gumption: A Brad Pope and Sisterfriends Mystery: The New Apple Book Medal for psychological suspense, the Silver IPPY Award for outstanding mystery of the year; the USA Regional Excellence Book Award for best fiction in the Southeast; and the Bronze Foreword Review Book Award for best mystery

== Bibliography ==
=== Nonfiction (Books) ===
- Latchkey Kids: Unlocking Doors for Children and Their Families. Lexington, MA: Lexington Books. (1986). ISBN 0-669-11929-6 with Rowland and Coleman
- The Developing Father: Emerging Roles in Contemporary Society. New York: Guilford Press with Barret. (1986). ISBN 0-89862-662-5 with Barret
- Teenage Fathers. Lexington, MA: Lexington Books (1998). ISBN 0-669-14587-4
- Home-Alone Kids. Lexington, MA: Lexington Books (1989). ISBN 0-669-19504-9 with Rowland and Coleman
- Working with Children of Alcoholic Parents: The Practitioner's Handbook. Lexington, MA: Lexington Books (1989). ISBN 0-669-16638-3
- Work Addiction: Hidden legacies of Adult Children from Dysfunctional Families. Deerfield Beach, FL: HCI Books (1989). ISBN 1-55874-023-6
- Gay Fathers. Lexington, MA: Lexington Books (1990). ISBN 0-669-19514-6 with Barret
- Soothing Moments: Daily Meditations for Fast-Track Living. Deerfield Beach, FL: HCI Books (1990). ISBN 1-55874-075-9
- Healograms: Healing Messages for Co-Dependents. Deerfield Beach, FL: HCI Books (1991).
- Heal Your Self-Esteem. Deerfield Beach, FL: HCI Books (1991). ISBN 1-55874-119-4
- The Feel Good Book: 1001 Ways to Be Happy. Nashville, TN: Thomas Nelson (1992). ISBN 0-8407-3441-7
- Healograms: Healing Messages for Self-Esteem. Deerfield Beach, FL: HCI Books (1993).
- 611 Ways to Boost Your Self-Esteem. Deerfield Beach, FL: HCI Books (1994). ISBN 1-55874-297-2 with McCullers
- Overdoing It: How to Slow Down and Take Care of Yourself. Deerfield Beach, FL: HCI Books (1992). ISBN 1-55874-288-3
- Working With Children of Alcoholics: The Practitioner's Handbook. (2nd Ed.). Thousand Oaks, CA: Sage Publishers (1998). ISBN 0-7619-0757-2 with Rhoden
- Chained to the Desk: A Guidebook for Workaholics, Their Partners and Children, and the Clinicians Who Treat Them. New York: NYU Press (1998, 1st Edition). ISBN 0-8147-7480-6
- Latchkey Kids. Thousand Oaks, CA: Sage Publishers (1999, 2nd Edition). ISBN 0-7619-1259-2 with Lamorey, Rowland, and Coleman
- Gay Fathers. San Francisco, CA: Wiley (2000, 2nd Edition). ISBN 0-7879-5075-0 with Barret
- Don’t Let Your Mind Stunt Your Growth. Oakland, CA: New Harbinger Publications (2000). ISBN 1-57224-193-4
- High Performing Families: Problems, Solutions, and Treatment. Washington, DC: American Counseling Association (2001). ISBN 1-55620-183-4 with Chase
- Chained to the Desk: A Guidebook for Workaholics, Their Partners and Children, and the Clinicians Who Treat Them. New York: NYU Press (2007, 2nd Edition). ISBN 978-0-8147-7597-4
- The Art of Confident Living. Deerfield Beach, FL: HCI Books (2009). ISBN 978-0-7573-0651-8
- The Smart Guide to Managing Stress. New York: Smart Guide Publications (2012). ISBN 978-1-937-636-26-5
- Chained to the Desk: A Guidebook for Workaholics, Their Partners and Children, and the Clinicians Who Treat Them. New York: NYU Press (2014, 3rd Edition). ISBN 978-0-8147-8923-0
- Daily Writing Reislience: 365 Meditations & Inspirations For Writers Llewellyn Publications (2018, 1st Edition). ISBN 978-0-7387-5343-0
- #Chill: Turn Off Your Job and Turn On Your Life William Morrow (2019, 1st Edition). ISBN 978-0-06-289601-8

=== Fiction (Books) ===
- Limestone Gumption: A Brad Pope and Sisterfriends Mystery. Waterville, ME: Five Star/Cengage (2014). ISBN 978-1-4328-2778-6
- Limestone Gumption. (Paperback version). Santa Fe, NM: Sunstone Press (2016). ISBN 978-1-63293-101-6
