= Effort justification =

Overvaluing of effortful achievements

Effort justification is an idea and paradigm in social psychology stemming from Leon Festinger's theory of cognitive dissonance. Effort justification is a person's tendency to attribute the value of an outcome they put effort into achieving as greater than the objective value of the outcome.

== Theory and research ==
Cognitive dissonance theory explains changes in people's attitudes or beliefs as the result of an attempt to reduce a dissonance (discrepancy) between contradicting ideas or cognitions. In the case of effort justification, there is a dissonance between the amount of effort exerted into achieving a goal or completing a task (high effort equaling high "cost") and the subjective reward for that effort (lower than was expected for such an effort). By adjusting and increasing one's attitude or subjective value of the goal, this dissonance is resolved.

One of the first and most classic examples of effort justification is Aronson and Mills's study. A group of young women who volunteered to join a discussion group on the topic of the psychology of sex were asked to do a small reading test to make sure they were not too embarrassed to talk about sexual-related topics with others. The mild-embarrassment condition subjects were asked to read aloud a list of sex-related words such as prostitute or virgin. The severe-embarrassment condition subjects were asked to read aloud a list of highly sexual words (e.g. fuck, cock) and to read two vivid descriptions of sexual activity taken from contemporary novels. All subjects then listened to a recording of a discussion about sexual behavior in animals which was dull and unappealing. When asked to rate the group and its members, control and mild-embarrassment groups did not differ, but the severe-embarrassment group's ratings were significantly higher. This group, whose initiation process was more difficult (embarrassment equaling effort), had to increase their subjective value of the discussion group to resolve the dissonance.

== Competing views ==
Critics of this theory claim it is dependent on complex social context (which is responsible for the creation of dissonance), but research has shown the same effects in children (who understand less about social context and therefore are less likely to be influenced by it) and even in pigeons. Alessandri, Darcheville & Zentall (2008) argue that the cause for these findings, both in humans and animals, is the contrast effect. According to this theory, the preference is a result of the difference between the reward and the situation that leads to it. When the preliminary situation is unpleasant or strenuous, the difference between it and the reward that follows is great. When the preliminary situation is not especially unpleasant or strenuous, the difference between it and the reward is smaller. The reward that has the larger difference from its preliminary situation will be preferred since it is experienced as more positive.

In the context of hazing and group initiation rituals, there is support for the reward explanation since group identity among initiates increases as feelings of being rewarded increase. Another alternative explanation is that hazing or initiation rituals increase physiological responses, which then cause an increase in affiliation among initiates. Alternatively, hazing and initiation effects have been associated with Bowlby's attachment theory.

== See also ==
- Behavioral economics
- IKEA effect
- Omission bias
