= Post-work society =

Form of society

In futurology, political science, and science fiction, a post-work society is a society in which the nature of work has been radically transformed and traditional employment has largely become obsolete due to technological progress.

Some post-work theorists imagine the complete automation of all jobs, or at least the takeover of all monotonous, rule-based, predictable and repetitive (and thus unworthy of humans) tasks in the future by ultimately cheaper, faster, more efficient, more reliable and more accurate intelligent machines. Additionally, these machines can work in harsher conditions and for longer periods of time without stopping than humans, which is expected to lead to a transition period of rapid economic growth, despite high rates of ever-increasing human unemployment. Overall, this development is expected to lead to an enormous increase in general prosperity, provided that the wealth is fairly redistributed among the population.

== Future directions ==
Future directions include the reshaping of the role of humans in the workplace and stressing the relative strengths of humans capable of adapting and integrating technology into their work and interaction. In addition to these capabilities, scholars emphasize the importance of humans taking advantage of these relative strengths, offering several areas which humans can remain competent in a rapidly developing workplace, such as emotional intelligence, service orientation, resource management skills, communication skills, and entrepreneurship skills.

Scholarly literature defines such areas where machines may surpass humans as "task encroachment", which presents an issue of growing encroachment of AI and automation into human work, especially in manual and cognitive tasks. It is estimated that approximately 40% of all working hours will be affected by AI models. It has been proposed for humanity to pivot towards roles that require emotional intelligence and interpersonal skills, assumed to be more uniquely human. However, studies show that in some contexts, modern chatbots generate answers that are rated as more empathetic and qualitative than human ones.

Some theories of a post-work society focus on challenging the priority of the work ethic and on the celebration of non-work activities.

Near-term practical proposals closely associated with post-work theory include the implementation of a universal basic income and the reduction of the length of a working day and the number of days of a working week. Increased focus on what post-work society would look like has been driven by reports such as one in 2018 that states 47% of jobs in the United States could be automated. Because of increasing automation and the low price of maintaining an automated workforce compared to one dependent on human labor, it has been suggested that post-work societies would also be ones of post-scarcity.

According to Nick Bostrom, advanced artificial intelligence has the potential to automate jobs, create abundance, and undermine the purpose of leisure activities such as shopping, gardening, or parenting.

== See also ==
- Critique of work
- Four-day workweek
- In Praise of Idleness
- Humans Need Not Apply
- Imagination age
- Post-capitalism
- Refusal of work
- Tang ping ("lying flat")
- Technological utopianism
- Inventing the Future: Postcapitalism and a World Without Work
- The End of Work
- The Future of Work and Death
- Workism
