= Swedish Public Freedom Service =

Conceptual art project

The Swedish Public Freedom Service (Swedish: Frihetsförmedlingen) is an art project that considers itself a "self-organising authority", running since 2014 by the artists Lars Noväng and John Huntington. Frihetsförmedlingen claims to be Sweden's largest provider of freedom.

The website is a clear paraphrase of the Swedish Public Employment Service. According to Noväng, the Freedom Service reflects the approach to work: freedom must be provided at all costs, without any reflection on why this should be so. The message of the Freedom Service comes through because of our relationship with bureaucracies. Noväng also argues that changes in the last 200 years or so have always been shifts in power, while not much that is fundamental to the construction of society has changed. We are largely marinated in the belief that waged work must be central.

The Freedom Service has also provided freedom brokers to the public. Something they have done in a number of places such as Gothenburg, Kalmar, Boden, Varberg and Norrköping.
