= Workism =

Social trend

Workism is a term describing excessive devotion to work ethic, so much that it defines a person's purpose in life. American journalist Derek Thompson coined the term in a 2019 article for The Atlantic.

Workism may come across as cult-like because it burdens workists to present themselves positively, rely on groupthink, let work dictate their relationships and thinking, and pursue an idealised outcome that may be unrealistic. Workism may be experienced as oppressive by both working and non-working people. Workist attitudes may develop in the context of a historically Protestant work ethic, or independently as a heuristic bias redeeming hustle culture, in which people try to justify the immense sacrifices they have made to maintain and advance their careers, rather than the reason they started making those sacrifices. It is also claimed that workism has trickled down from the top, for whom this disposition makes more sense.

Workism takes after, but differs from productivism and producerism. Producerism focuses on the merit of what is being produced, through any means, while workism focuses on the merit of accomplishing or earning something through work. Productivism is like workism, but more readily praises non-work activities, assuming those activities produce something of tangible value or lead to it.

== Work martyr ==
A person who puts work before their own time and health may be called a 'work martyr'. Work martyrs typically experience gratification from work and outperform others, but may be unable to delegate or unplug from work.

A work martyr is commonly called a workaholic, though unlike workaholics, work martyrs may not work excessively despite being preoccupied with work. Workaholism can also be a result of stress or some mental illnesses, whereas work martyrdom may be perceived by the martyr as a temporary experience to advance their career or avoid negative consequences at work.

== See also ==
- Achievement ideology – Concept in sociology
- Anarchism – Political philosophy and movement
- Bedtime procrastination – Psychological phenomenon
- Effort justification – Overvaluing of effortful achievements
- Escalation of commitment – Human behavior pattern in which the participant takes on increasing risk
- Iron cage – Concept in sociology
- Producerism – Belief that workers benefit society more than those who get wealth through other means
- Productivism – Primacy of productivity and growth
- Protestant work ethic – Social-theologic concept
- Workaholism – Person who works compulsively
- Work ethic – Belief in the virtues of labor
