= In Praise of Idleness and Other Essays =

1935 book by Bertrand Russell

- Cover of the Routledge Classics edition (1997)
- Author: Bertrand Russell
- Language: English
- Subjects: Sociology, philosophy, economics, politics, architecture
- Publisher: George Allen & Unwin Ltd
- Publication date: 1935
- Publication place: United Kingdom
- Media type: Print (Hardcover and Paperback)
- Pages: 242
- ISBN: 978-0-04-304001-0

In Praise of Idleness and Other Essays is a 1935 collection of essays by the philosopher Bertrand Russell.

== Summary ==
The collection includes essays on the subjects of sociology, ethics and philosophy. In the eponymous essay, Russell displays a series of arguments and reasoning with the aim of stating how the 'belief in the virtue of labour causes great evils in the modern world, and that the road to happiness, and prosperity lies instead in a diminution of labour' and how work 'is by no means one of the purposes of human life'.

Russell argues that if labour was equitably shared out amongst everyone, resulting in shorter workdays, unemployment would decrease and human happiness would increase due to the increase in leisure time, further resulting in increased involvement in the arts and sciences.

Russell defends this thesis with two main arguments:

- The first is that the value of work is a moral prejudice of the privileged classes who believe that the absence of activity would lead most men, especially those of the poorer classes, to idleness and depravity. Consequently, it would be in the interest of men to be exploited;
- The second is that industrial production is now sufficient to provide, with a minimum of labour, for the needs of all human beings.

The rationalisation of wartime production has shown that a small number of people can produce the necessities of life for the whole population. Even more so, if this work is shared by the whole population, it follows that an individual does not need to work much to produce the resources essential to life, and some more.

Russell therefore argues that four hours of work per day would be enough to keep the whole population living in sufficient comfort, while the rest of the time would be devoted to leisure. Russell's conception of leisure is similar to the Latin otium praised by Seneca. This leisure would be devoted to all forms of culture (from the most popular to the most intellectual) whose practice would be encouraged by a liberated education.

Other related themes emerge in the book: pacifism, politics (which Russell ridicules), the denunciation of landowners who live in idleness at the expense of others. He also denounces the Soviet regime, which also obeyed the dogma of work in an authoritarian manner, the cult of efficiency, the problem of the confinement of intellectuals in their own sphere, far from the reality of people that have to work, and worker's estrangement from the good leisure (that which is non-passive and which enriches civilisation).

The notion of leisure, no longer as a simple recuperation necessary to the body, but as an opportunity to discover new life experiences is also present.

== See also ==
- Critique of work
- The Right to Be Lazy
- Bonjour paresse

== External link ==
- Full text of In Praise of Idleness at RevoltLib
