= Poäng =

Wooden armchair by IKEA

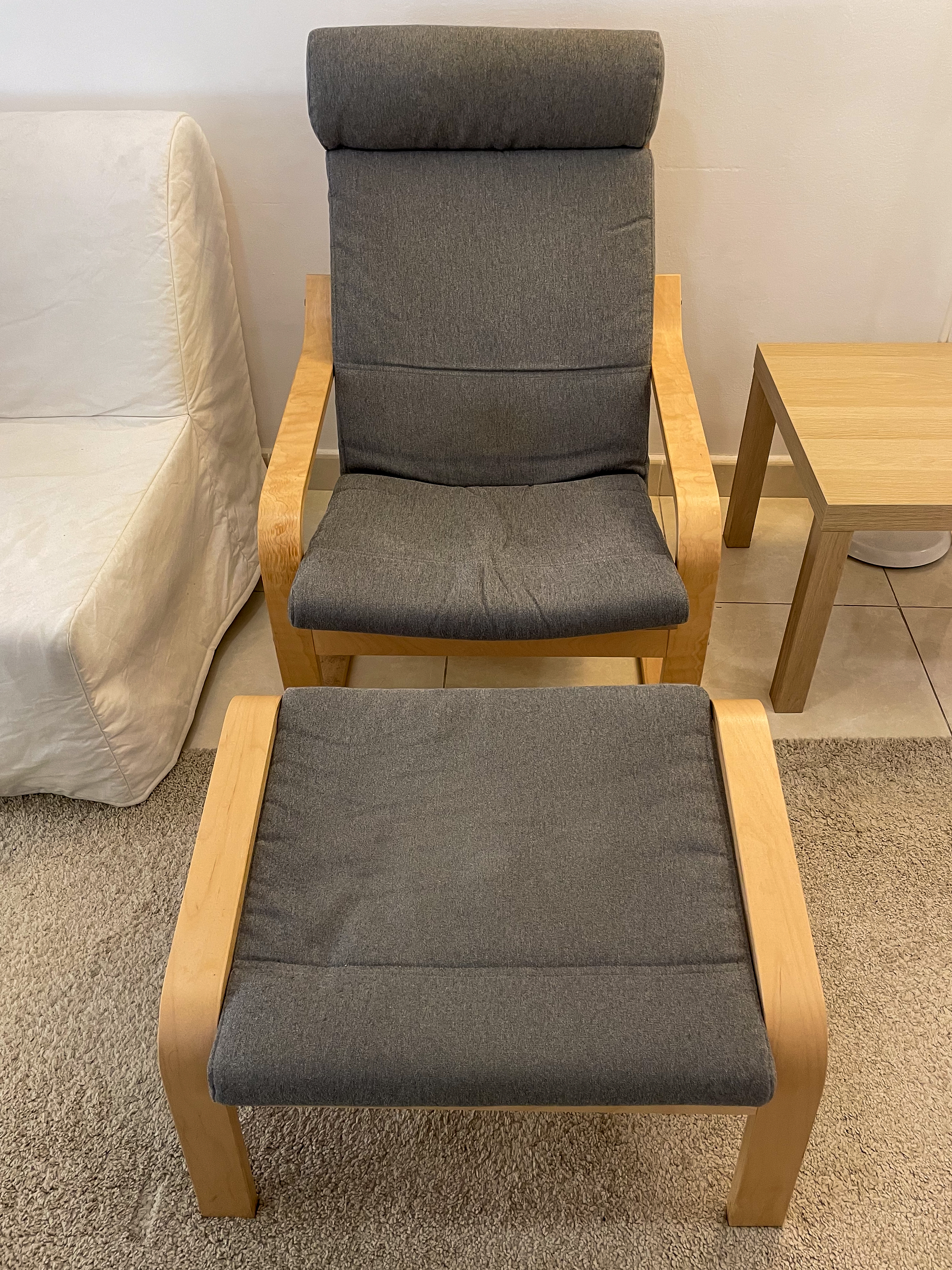
- A Poäng chair and footstool
- Designer: Noboru Nakamura
- Date: 1976 (original Poem design), 1992 (current Poäng design)
- Sold by: IKEA

The Poäng (Swedish pronunciation: [pʊˈɛ̂ŋ], lit. 'point, argument, punch-line') is a wooden cantilever armchair that has been sold by the Swedish furniture retailer IKEA since 1992. As of 2016, IKEA sold about one-and-a-half million Poängs annually, and had produced a total of 30 million.

Japanese designer Noboru Nakamura created the original chair, then called the "Poem", in 1975 in collaboration with product manager Lars Engman, who later headed up the IKEA design team. The design of both the Poem and Poäng chairs resemble that of the 'Armchair 406', created by the Finnish designer Alvar Aalto in 1939, as well as the 'Pernilla' armchair designed by Swedish architect Bruno Mathsson in 1944. The IKEA chair features thin upholstery instead of the 406's webbed seat. Its molded plywood frame swings slightly when a person sits in it, giving the impression of a rocking chair; Nakamura intended this to evoke a relaxing feeling.

The chair was first launched in 1976 under the name "Poem". Since then, IKEA has changed the design several times. It was renamed "Poäng" in 1992, and the seat frame was changed from tubular steel to wood, which allowed the chair to be flat-packed, resulting in a 21% price reduction. IKEA has also updated the color, pattern, and material of the upholstery to account for changing customer preferences. IKEA has decreased the price of a Poäng markedly since its introduction. In 1990, IKEA sold it for up to $350 ($863.00 in 2025) in the United States, compared to a 2016 price of $79.

In its post-1990s form, the Poäng is composed of a frame of bent, glued beechwood veneers and solid wooden rails, finished with clear lacquer and available in various colors. The seating material consists of polypropylene support fabric and cushions made of leather or fabric filled with polyurethane foam. A matching ottoman footstool is also sold.

IKEA founder Ingvar Kamprad expressed an affinity for the Poäng and said in 2006 that he had owned the same one for 32 years.
